= List of accolades received by Sentimental Value =

Sentimental Value accolades
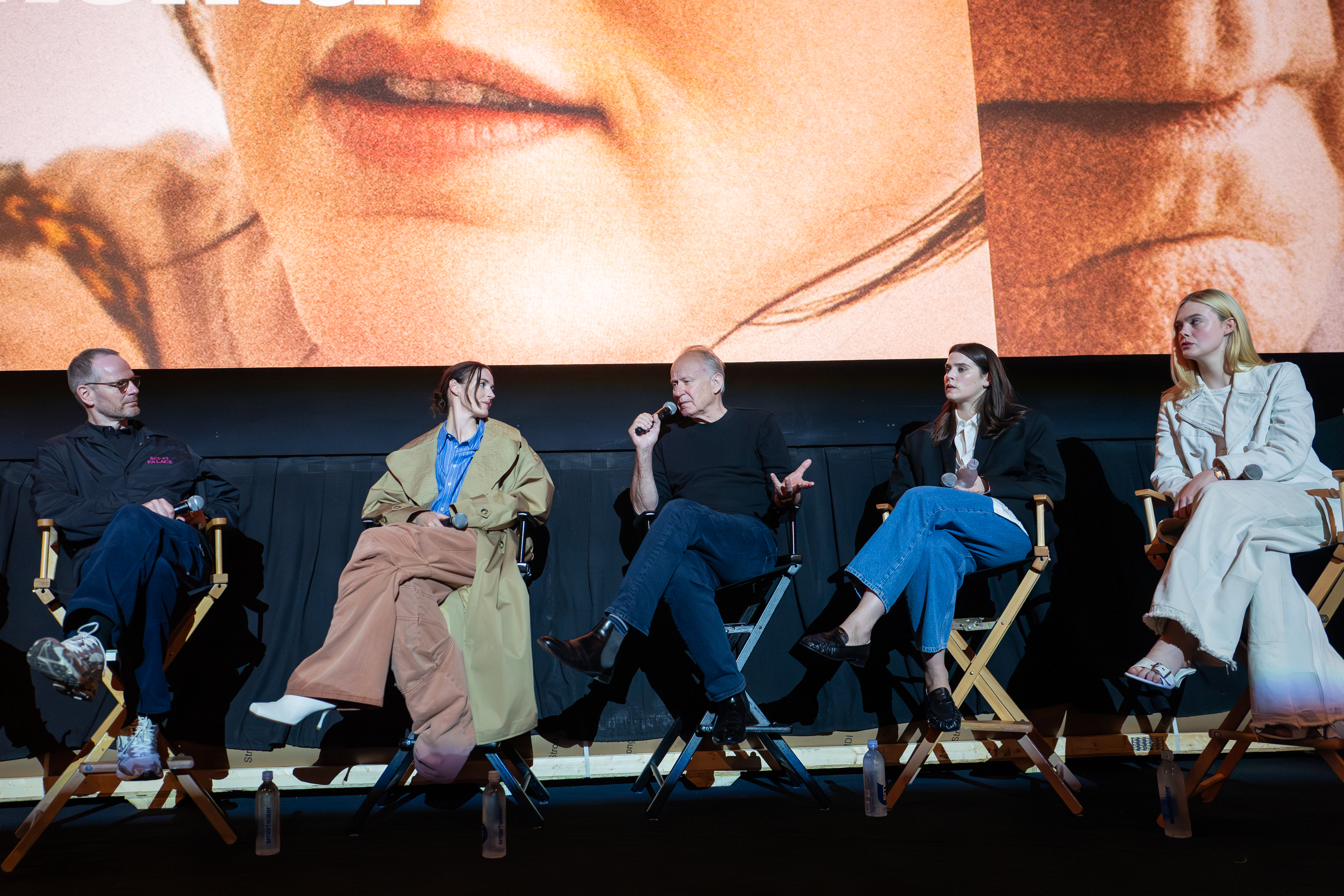
- L–R: Director Joachim Trier received numerous accolades for his direction and screenplay. Actors Renate Reinsve, Stellan Skarsgård, Inga Ibsdotter Lilleaas, and Elle Fanning also received accolades for their performance.
Awards and nominations
Award	Wins	Nominations
AACTA Awards	1	3
AARP Movies for Grownups Awards	2	3
Academy Awards	1	9
Artios Awards	1	1
Astra Film Awards	2	11
Austin Film Critics Association Awards	1	5
Belgian Film Critics Association Awards	0	1
British Academy Film Awards	1	8
British Independent Film Awards	1	1
Boston Online Film Critics Association	1	1
Boston Society of Film Critics	2	2
Camerimage	1	1
Cannes Film Festival	1	2
César Awards	0	1
Chicago Film Critics Association	0	3
Critics' Choice Movie Awards	0	7
Dallas–Fort Worth Film Critics Association	5	5
Dublin Film Critics' Circle	2	2
Dorian Awards	1	4
EDA Awards	2	7
European Film Awards	6	9
Filmfest München	2	3
Florida Film Critics Circle	0	2
Georgia Film Critics Association	3	8
Golden Globe Awards	1	8
Gotham Independent Film Awards	0	2
Goya Awards	1	1
Hamptons International Film Festival	1	1
Houston Film Critics Society	1	7
International Cinephile Society	1	5
Irish Film & Television Awards	0	2
Kansas City Film Critics Circle	0	6
Locarno Film Festival	0	1
London Film Critics' Circle	1	4
Los Angeles Film Critics Association	2	2
Lumière Awards	0	1
Miskolc International Film Festival	1	1
Montclair Film Festival	1	2
National Board of Review	2	2
National Society of Film Critics	4	4
New York Film Critics Online	4	9
Online Film Critics Society	1	8
Palm Springs International Film Festival	1	1
Producers Guild of America Awards	0	1
San Diego Film Critics Society	2	4
San Francisco Bay Area Film Critics Circle Awards	4	8
San Sebastián International Film Festival	0	1
Santa Barbara International Film Festival	2	2
Satellite Awards	0	8
Savannah Film Festival	1	1
Seattle Film Critics Society	0	3
Seville European Film Festival	1	1
Southeastern Film Critics Association	3	3
St. Louis Film Critics Association	0	4
Toronto Film Critics Association	2	2
Toronto International Film Festival	1	1
Vancouver Film Critics Circle	0	4
Washington D.C. Area Film Critics Association Awards	1	7

Totals (Note: Certain award groups do not simply award one winner. They acknowledge several different recipients, have runners-up, and have third place. Since this is a specific recognition and is different from losing an award, runner-up mentions are considered wins in this award tally. For simplification and to avoid errors, each award in this list has been presumed to have had a prior nomination.)
- Wins: 76
- Nominations: 216

Sentimental Value is a 2025 Norwegian drama film directed by Joachim Trier, who co-wrote it with Eskil Vogt. The film stars Renate Reinsve, Stellan Skarsgård, Inga Ibsdotter Lilleaas, and Elle Fanning. The film follows the sisters Nora (Reinsve) and Agnes (Lilleaas) in their reunion with their estranged father Gustav (Skarsgård).

The film had its premiere at the 2025 Cannes Film Festival on 21 May 2025, and was released in the United States by Neon on 7 November 2025. It was also selected as the Norwegian entry for Best International Feature Film at the 98th Academy Awards, making the December shortlist.

Sentimental Value garnered awards and nominations in a wide range of categories, with recognition for its direction, screenplay, and performances. At the 31st Critics' Choice Awards, it was nominated for seven awards. It was also nominated for eight awards at the 83rd Golden Globe Awards, including Best Motion Picture – Drama and Best Director, winning Best Supporting Actor in a Motion Picture for Skarsgård.

At the 98th Academy Awards, the film was nominated for nine awards, including Best Picture and Best Directing for Joachim Trier, Best Actress for Reinsve, Best Supporting Actor for Skarsgård, and Best Supporting Actress for both Fanning and Lilleaas. The film was also nominated for eight awards at the 79th British Academy Film Awards including Best Film and Best Original Screenplay, winning Best Film Not in the English Language.

== Accolades ==
Award	Date of ceremony	Category	Recipient(s)	Result	Ref.
AACTA International Awards	6 February 2026	Best Actress	Renate Reinsve	Nominated	
AACTA International Awards	6 February 2026	Best Supporting Actress	Elle Fanning	Nominated	
AACTA International Awards	6 February 2026	Best Screenplay	Joachim Trier and Eskil Vogt	Won	
AARP Movies for Grownups Awards	10 January 2026	Best Supporting Actor	Stellan Skarsgård	Nominated	
AARP Movies for Grownups Awards	10 January 2026	Best Foreign Language Film	Sentimental Value	Won	
AARP Movies for Grownups Awards	10 January 2026	Best Intergenerational Film	Sentimental Value	Won	
Academy Awards	15 March 2026	Best Picture	Maria Ekerhovd and Andrea Berentsen Ottmar	Nominated	
Academy Awards	15 March 2026	Best Director	Joachim Trier	Nominated	
Academy Awards	15 March 2026	Best Actress	Renate Reinsve	Nominated	
Academy Awards	15 March 2026	Best Supporting Actor	Stellan Skarsgård	Nominated	
Academy Awards	15 March 2026	Best Supporting Actress	Elle Fanning	Nominated	
Academy Awards	15 March 2026	Best Supporting Actress	Inga Ibsdotter Lilleas	Nominated	
Academy Awards	15 March 2026	Best Original Screenplay	Joachim Trier and Eskil Vogt	Nominated	
Academy Awards	15 March 2026	Best International Feature Film	Norway	Won	
Academy Awards	15 March 2026	Best Film Editing	Olivier Bugge Coutté	Nominated	
Artios Awards	26 February 2026	Outstanding Achievement in Casting – Feature Studio or Independent – Drama	Avy Kaufman	Won	
Astra Film Awards	9 January 2026	Best Picture – Drama	Sentimental Value	Nominated	
Astra Film Awards	9 January 2026	Best Director	Joachim Trier	Nominated	
Astra Film Awards	9 January 2026	Best Actress – Drama	Renate Reinsve	Nominated	
Astra Film Awards	9 January 2026	Best Supporting Actor – Drama	Stellan Skarsgård	Won	
Astra Film Awards	9 January 2026	Best Supporting Actress – Drama	Elle Fanning	Nominated	
Astra Film Awards	9 January 2026	Best Supporting Actress – Drama	Inga Ibsdotter Lilleaas	Nominated	
Astra Film Awards	9 January 2026	Best Original Screenplay	Joachim Trier and Eskil Vogt	Nominated	
Astra Film Awards	9 January 2026	Best Cast Ensemble	Sentimental Value	Nominated	
Astra Film Awards	9 January 2026	Best International Feature	Sentimental Value	Won	
Astra Film Awards	11 December 2025	Best Casting	Yngvill Kolset Haga and Avy Kaufman	Nominated	
Astra Film Awards	11 December 2025	Best Film Editing	Olivier Bugge Coutté	Nominated	
Austin Film Critics Association	18 December 2025	Best Picture	Sentimental Value	4th place	
Austin Film Critics Association	18 December 2025	Best International Film	Sentimental Value	Nominated	
Austin Film Critics Association	18 December 2025	Best Director	Joachim Trier	Nominated	
Austin Film Critics Association	18 December 2025	Best Supporting Actress	Inga Ibsdotter Lilleaas	Nominated	
Austin Film Critics Association	18 December 2025	Best Original Screenplay	Joachim Trier and Eskil Vogt	Nominated	
Belgian Film Critics Association	11 January 2026	Grand Prix	Sentimental Value	Nominated	
British Academy Film Awards	22 February 2026	Best Film	Maria Ekerhovd and Andrea Berentsen Ottmar	Nominated	
British Academy Film Awards	22 February 2026	Best Film Not in the English Language	Joachim Trier, Maria Ekerhovd, and Andrea Berentsen Ottmar	Won	
British Academy Film Awards	22 February 2026	Best Direction	Joachim Trier	Nominated	
British Academy Film Awards	22 February 2026	Best Original Screenplay	Eskil Vogt and Joachim Trier	Nominated	
British Academy Film Awards	22 February 2026	Best Actress in a Leading Role	Renate Reinsve	Nominated	
British Academy Film Awards	22 February 2026	Best Actor in a Supporting Role	Stellan Skarsgård	Nominated	
British Academy Film Awards	22 February 2026	Best Actress in a Supporting Role	Inga Ibsdotter Lilleaas	Nominated	
British Academy Film Awards	22 February 2026	Best Casting	Yngvill Kolset Haga and Avy Kaufman	Nominated	
British Independent Film Awards	30 November 2025	Best International Independent Film	Joachim Trier, Eskil Vogt, Maria Ekerhovd, and Andrea Berentsen Ottmar	Won	
Boston Online Film Critics Association	20 December 2025	Top Ten Films of 2025	Sentimental Value	6th place	
Boston Society of Film Critics	14 December 2025	Best Supporting Actor	Stellan Skarsgård	Won	
Boston Society of Film Critics	14 December 2025	Best Non-English Language Film	Sentimental Value	Won	
Camerimage	22 November 2025	Audience Award	Sentimental Value	Won	
Cannes Film Festival	24 May 2025	Palme d'Or	Joachim Trier	Nominated	
Cannes Film Festival	24 May 2025	Grand Prix	Joachim Trier	Won	
César Awards	26 February 2026	Best Foreign Film	Joachim Trier	Nominated	
Chicago Film Critics Association	11 December 2025	Best Supporting Actor	Stellan Skarsgård	Nominated	
Chicago Film Critics Association	11 December 2025	Best Supporting Actress	Inga Ibsdotter Lilleaas	Nominated	
Chicago Film Critics Association	11 December 2025	Best Foreign Language Film	Sentimental Value	Nominated	
Critics' Choice Awards	4 January 2026	Best Picture	Sentimental Value	Nominated	
Critics' Choice Awards	4 January 2026	Best Director	Joachim Trier	Nominated	
Critics' Choice Awards	4 January 2026	Best Actress	Renate Reinsve	Nominated	
Critics' Choice Awards	4 January 2026	Best Supporting Actor	Stellan Skarsgård	Nominated	
Critics' Choice Awards	4 January 2026	Best Supporting Actress	Elle Fanning	Nominated	
Critics' Choice Awards	4 January 2026	Best Supporting Actress	Inga Ibsdotter Lilleaas	Nominated	
Critics' Choice Awards	4 January 2026	Best Original Screenplay	Eskil Vogt and Joachim Trier	Nominated	
Dallas–Fort Worth Film Critics Association	17 December 2025	Best Picture	Sentimental Value	5th place	
Dallas–Fort Worth Film Critics Association	17 December 2025	Best Actress	Renate Reinsve	3rd place	
Dallas–Fort Worth Film Critics Association	17 December 2025	Best Supporting Actor	Stellan Skarsgård	Won	
Dallas–Fort Worth Film Critics Association	17 December 2025	Best Supporting Actress	Inga Ibsdotter Lilleaas	3rd place	
Dallas–Fort Worth Film Critics Association	17 December 2025	Best Foreign Language Film	Sentimental Value	Won	
Dublin Film Critics' Circle	18 December 2025	Best Film	Sentimental Value	6th place	
Dublin Film Critics' Circle	18 December 2025	Best Actress	Renate Reinsve	Runner-up	
Dorian Awards	3 March 2026	Non-English Language Film of the Year	Sentimental Value	Won	
Dorian Awards	3 March 2026	Film Performance of the Year	Renate Reinsve	Nominated	
Dorian Awards	3 March 2026	Supporting Film Performance of the Year	Inga Ibsdotter Lilleaas	Nominated	
Dorian Awards	3 March 2026	Supporting Film Performance of the Year	Stellan Skarsgård	Nominated	
EDA Awards	31 December 2025	Best Film	Sentimental Value	Nominated	
EDA Awards	31 December 2025	Best Director	Joachim Trier	Nominated	
EDA Awards	31 December 2025	Best Original Screenplay	Eskil Vogt and Joachim Trier	Nominated	
EDA Awards	31 December 2025	Best Actress	Renate Reinsve	Nominated	
EDA Awards	31 December 2025	Best Supporting Actress	Inga Ibsdotter Lilleaas	Nominated	
EDA Awards	31 December 2025	Best Supporting Actor	Stellan Skarsgård	Won	
EDA Awards	31 December 2025	Best Foreign Language Film	Sentimental Value	Won	
European Film Awards	17 January 2026	Best Film	Sentimental Value	Won	
European Film Awards	17 January 2026	Best Director	Joachim Trier	Won	
European Film Awards	17 January 2026	Best Screenwriter	Eskil Vogt and Joachim Trier	Won	
European Film Awards	17 January 2026	Best Actor	Stellan Skarsgård	Won	
European Film Awards	17 January 2026	Best Actress	Renate Reinsve	Won	
European Film Awards	17 January 2026	Best Composer	Hania Rani	Won	
European Film Awards	17 January 2026	Best Casting Director	Yngvill Kolset Haga and Avy Kaufman	Nominated	
European Film Awards	17 January 2026	Best Production Designer	Jørgen Stangebye Larsen	Nominated	
European Film Awards	14 April 2026	Lux Award	Sentimental Value	Nominated	
Filmfest München	4 July 2025	Audience Awards – International	Sentimental Value	Won	
Filmfest München	4 July 2025	CineCoPro	Sentimental Value	Nominated	
Filmfest München	4 July 2025	CineMerit Award	Stellan Skarsgård	Won	
Florida Film Critics Circle	19 December 2025	Best Original Screenplay	Joachim Trier and Eskil Vogt	Nominated	
Florida Film Critics Circle	19 December 2025	Best Ensemble	Sentimental Value	Nominated	
Georgia Film Critics Association	27 December 2025	Best Picture	Sentimental Value	Nominated	
Georgia Film Critics Association	27 December 2025	Best Director	Joachim Trier	Nominated	
Georgia Film Critics Association	27 December 2025	Best Actress	Renate Reinsve	Runner-up	
Georgia Film Critics Association	27 December 2025	Best Supporting Actor	Stellan Skarsgård	Nominated	
Georgia Film Critics Association	27 December 2025	Best Supporting Actress	Inga Ibsdotter Lilleaas	Nominated	
Georgia Film Critics Association	27 December 2025	Best Original Screenplay	Joachim Trier and Eskil Vogt	Runner-up	
Georgia Film Critics Association	27 December 2025	Best Ensemble	Sentimental Value	Nominated	
Georgia Film Critics Association	27 December 2025	Best International Film	Sentimental Value	Won	
Golden Globe Awards	11 January 2026	Best Motion Picture – Drama	Sentimental Value	Nominated	
Golden Globe Awards	11 January 2026	Best Motion Picture – Non-English Language	Sentimental Value	Nominated	
Golden Globe Awards	11 January 2026	Best Director	Joachim Trier	Nominated	
Golden Globe Awards	11 January 2026	Best Actress in a Motion Picture – Drama	Renate Reinsve	Nominated	
Golden Globe Awards	11 January 2026	Best Supporting Actor in a Motion Picture	Stellan Skarsgård	Won	
Golden Globe Awards	11 January 2026	Best Supporting Actress in a Motion Picture	Elle Fanning	Nominated	
Golden Globe Awards	11 January 2026	Best Supporting Actress in a Motion Picture	Inga Ibsdotter Lilleaas	Nominated	
Golden Globe Awards	11 January 2026	Best Screenplay	Eskil Vogt and Joachim Trier	Nominated	
Gotham Independent Film Awards	2 December 2025	Outstanding Supporting Performance	Inga Ibsdotter Lilleaas	Nominated	
Gotham Independent Film Awards	2 December 2025	Outstanding Supporting Performance	Stellan Skarsgård	Nominated	
Goya Awards	28 February 2026	Best European Film	Sentimental Value	Won	
Hamptons International Film Festival	14 October 2025	Best Narrative Feature	Sentimental Value	Won	
Houston Film Critics Society	20 January 2026	Best Picture	Sentimental Value	Nominated	
Houston Film Critics Society	20 January 2026	Best Actress	Renate Reinsve	Nominated	
Houston Film Critics Society	20 January 2026	Best Supporting Actor	Stellan Skarsgård	Nominated	
Houston Film Critics Society	20 January 2026	Best Supporting Actress	Inga Ibsdotter Lilleaas	Nominated	
Houston Film Critics Society	20 January 2026	Best Screenplay	Eskil Vogt and Joachim Trier	Nominated	
Houston Film Critics Society	20 January 2026	Best Foreign Language Feature	Sentimental Value	Won	
Houston Film Critics Society	20 January 2026	Best Ensemble	Sentimental Value	Nominated	
International Cinephile Society	8 February 2026	Best Picture	Sentimental Value	Nominated	
International Cinephile Society	8 February 2026	Best Supporting Actor	Stellan Skarsgård	Runner-up	
International Cinephile Society	8 February 2026	Best Supporting Actress	Inga Ibsdotter Lilleaas	Nominated	
International Cinephile Society	8 February 2026	Best Original Screenplay	Eskil Vogt and Joachim Trier	Nominated	
International Cinephile Society	8 February 2026	Best Ensemble	Sentimental Value	Nominated	
Irish Film & Television Awards	20 February 2026	Best International Film	Sentimental Value	Nominated	
Irish Film & Television Awards	20 February 2026	Best International Actress	Renate Reinsve	Nominated	
Kansas City Film Critics Circle	21 December 2025	Best Film	Sentimental Value	Nominated	
Kansas City Film Critics Circle	21 December 2025	Robert Altman Award for Best Director	Joachim Trier	Nominated	
Kansas City Film Critics Circle	21 December 2025	Best Actress	Renate Reinsve	Nominated	
Kansas City Film Critics Circle	21 December 2025	Best Supporting Actress	Inga Ibsdotter Lilleaas	Nominated	
Kansas City Film Critics Circle	21 December 2025	Best Original Screenplay	Joachim Trier and Eskil Vogt	Nominated	
Kansas City Film Critics Circle	21 December 2025	Best Foreign Language Film	Sentimental Value	Nominated	
Locarno Film Festival	17 August 2025	Prix du public	Sentimental Value	Nominated	
London Film Critics Circle	1 February 2026	Film of the Year	Sentimental Value	Nominated	
London Film Critics Circle	1 February 2026	Foreign Language Film of the Year	Sentimental Value	Won	
London Film Critics Circle	1 February 2026	Actress of the Year	Renate Reinsve	Nominated	
London Film Critics Circle	1 February 2026	Supporting Actress of the Year	Inga Ibsdotter Lilleaas	Nominated	
Los Angeles Film Critics Association	7 December 2025	Best Supporting Performance	Stellan Skarsgård	Won	
Los Angeles Film Critics Association	7 December 2025	Best Supporting Performance	Inga Ibsdotter Lilleaas	Runner-up	
Lumière Awards	18 January 2026	Best International Co-Production	Sentimental Value	Nominated	
Miskolc International Film Festival	13 September 2025	Emeric Pressburger Prize	Sentimental Value	Won	
Montclair Film Festival	15 October 2025	Fiction Feature Competition	Sentimental Value	Nominated	
Montclair Film Festival	15 October 2025	Audience Award	Sentimental Value	Won	
National Board of Review	13 January 2026	Best Supporting Actress	Inga Ibsdotter Lilleaas	Won	
National Board of Review	13 January 2026	Top Five International Films	Sentimental Value	Won	
National Society of Film Critics	3 January 2026	Best Actress	Renate Reinsve	3rd place	
National Society of Film Critics	3 January 2026	Best Supporting Actress	Inga Ibsdotter Lilleaas	Runner-up	
National Society of Film Critics	3 January 2026	Best Supporting Actor	Stellan Skarsgård	3rd place	
National Society of Film Critics	3 January 2026	Best Film Not in the English Languange	Sentimental Value	3rd place	
New York Film Critics Online	15 December 2025	Best Picture	Sentimental Value	Nominated	
New York Film Critics Online	15 December 2025	Best Director	Joachim Trier	Nominated	
New York Film Critics Online	15 December 2025	Best Screenplay	Joachim Trier and Eskil Vogt	Runner-up	
New York Film Critics Online	15 December 2025	Best Actress	Renate Reinsve	Nominated	
New York Film Critics Online	15 December 2025	Best Supporting Actor	Stellan Skarsgård	Runner-up	
New York Film Critics Online	15 December 2025	Best Supporting Actress	Elle Fanning	Nominated	
New York Film Critics Online	15 December 2025	Best Supporting Actress	Inga Ibsdotter Lilleaas	Won	
New York Film Critics Online	15 December 2025	Best Ensemble Cast	Sentimental Value	Nominated	
New York Film Critics Online	15 December 2025	Best International Feature	Sentimental Value	Runner-up	
Online Film Critics Society	26 January 2026	Best Picture	Sentimental Value	Nominated	
Online Film Critics Society	26 January 2026	Best Actress	Renate Reinsve	Nominated	
Online Film Critics Society	26 January 2026	Best Supporting Actor	Stellan Skarsgård	Nominated	
Online Film Critics Society	26 January 2026	Best Supporting Actress	Elle Fanning	Nominated	
Online Film Critics Society	26 January 2026	Best Supporting Actress	Inga Ibsdotter Lilleaas	Nominated	
Online Film Critics Society	26 January 2026	Best Original Screenplay	Joachim Trier and Eskil Vogt	Nominated	
Online Film Critics Society	26 January 2026	Best Film Not in the English Language	Sentimental Value	Won	
Online Film Critics Society	26 January 2026	Best Ensemble & Casting	Sentimental Value	Nominated	
Palm Springs International Film Festival	3 January 2026	International Star Award	Renate Reinsve, Stellan Skarsgård, Inga Ibsdotter Lilleass, and Elle Fanning	Won	
Producers Guild of America Awards	28 February 2026	Darryl F. Zanuck Award for Outstanding Producer of Theatrical Motion Pictures	Maria Ekerhovd and Andrea Berentsen Ottmar	Nominated	
San Diego Film Critics Society	15 December 2025	Best Actress	Renate Reinsve	Nominated	
San Diego Film Critics Society	15 December 2025	Best Supporting Actor	Stellan Skarsgård	Won	
San Diego Film Critics Society	15 December 2025	Best Original Screenplay	Joachim Trier and Eskil Vogt	Nominated	
San Diego Film Critics Society	15 December 2025	Best Foreign Language Film	Sentimental Value	Runner-up	
San Francisco Bay Area Film Critics Circle	14 December 2025	Best Picture	Sentimental Value	Nominated	
San Francisco Bay Area Film Critics Circle	14 December 2025	Best Director	Joachim Trier	Nominated	
San Francisco Bay Area Film Critics Circle	14 December 2025	Best Actress	Renate Reinsve	Nominated	
San Francisco Bay Area Film Critics Circle	14 December 2025	Best Supporting Actor	Stellan Skarsgård	Runner-up	
San Francisco Bay Area Film Critics Circle	14 December 2025	Best Supporting Actress	Elle Fanning	Nominated	
San Francisco Bay Area Film Critics Circle	14 December 2025	Best Supporting Actress	Inga Ibsdotter Lilleass	Runner-up	
San Francisco Bay Area Film Critics Circle	14 December 2025	Best Original Screenplay	Joachim Trier and Eskil Vogt	Won	
San Francisco Bay Area Film Critics Circle	14 December 2025	Best International Feature Film	Sentimental Value	Runner-up	
San Sebastián International Film Festival	27 September 2025	City of Donostia / San Sebastián Audience Award	Sentimental Value	Nominated	
Santa Barbara International Film Festival	8 February 2026	Virtuoso Award	Renate Reinsve	Honored	
Santa Barbara International Film Festival	11 February 2026	Montecito Award	Stellan Skarsgård	Won	
Satellite Awards	8 March 2026	Best Motion Picture – Drama	Sentimental Value	Nominated	
Satellite Awards	8 March 2026	Best Director	Joachim Trier	Nominated	
Satellite Awards	8 March 2026	Best Actress in a Motion Picture – Drama	Renate Reinsve	Nominated	
Satellite Awards	8 March 2026	Best Actor in a Supporting Role	Stellan Skarsgård	Won	
Satellite Awards	8 March 2026	Best Actress in a Supporting Role	Elle Fanning	Nominated	
Satellite Awards	8 March 2026	Best Actress in a Supporting Role	Inga Ibsdotter Lilleass	Nominated	
Satellite Awards	8 March 2026	Best Original Screenplay	Joachim Trier and Eskil Vogt	Nominated	
Satellite Awards	8 March 2026	Best Motion Picture – International	Sentimental Value	Nominated	
Savannah Film Festival	1 November 2025	Discovery Award	Inga Ibsdotter Lilleaas	Won	
Seattle Film Critics Society	15 December 2025	Best Picture	Sentimental Value	Nominated	
Seattle Film Critics Society	15 December 2025	Best Actress in a Supporting Role	Inga Ibsdotter Lilleaas	Nominated	
Seattle Film Critics Society	15 December 2025	Best International Film	Sentimental Value	Nominated	
Seville European Film Festival	15 November 2025	Puerta América Award	Sentimental Value	Won	
Southeastern Film Critics Association	December 15, 2025	Best Film	Sentimental Value	5th place	
Southeastern Film Critics Association	December 15, 2025	Best Foreign Language Film	Sentimental Value	Runner-up	
Southeastern Film Critics Association	December 15, 2025	Best Original Screenplay	Joachim Trier and Eskil Vogt	Runner-up	
St. Louis Film Critics Association	14 December 2025	Best Supporting Actor	Stellan Skarsgård	Nominated	
St. Louis Film Critics Association	14 December 2025	Best Supporting Actress	Elle Fanning	Nominated	
St. Louis Film Critics Association	14 December 2025	Best Supporting Actress	Inga Ibsdotter Lilleass	Nominated	
St. Louis Film Critics Association	14 December 2025	Best International Feature Film	Sentimental Value	Nominated	
Toronto Film Critics Association	2 March 2026	Outstanding Supporting Performance	Stellan Skarsgård	5th place	
Toronto Film Critics Association	2 March 2026	Best Original Screenplay	Joachim Trier and Eskil Vogt	3rd place	
Toronto International Film Festival	14 September 2025	International People's Choice Award	Sentimental Value	Runner-up	
Vancouver Film Critics Circle	23 February 2026	Best Female Actor	Renate Reinsve	Nominated	
Vancouver Film Critics Circle	23 February 2026	Best Supporting Male Actor	Stellan Skarsgård	Nominated	
Vancouver Film Critics Circle	23 February 2026	Best Supporting Female Actor	Elle Fanning	Nominated	
Vancouver Film Critics Circle	23 February 2026	Best International Film in Non-English Language	Sentimental Value	Nominated	
Washington D.C. Area Film Critics Association	7 December 2025	Best Film	Sentimental Value	Nominated	
Washington D.C. Area Film Critics Association	7 December 2025	Best Actress	Renate Reinsve	Nominated	
Washington D.C. Area Film Critics Association	7 December 2025	Best Supporting Actor	Stellan Skarsgård	Nominated	
Washington D.C. Area Film Critics Association	7 December 2025	Best Supporting Actress	Inga Ibsdotter Lilleaas	Nominated	
Washington D.C. Area Film Critics Association	7 December 2025	Best Original Screenplay	Eskil Vogt and Joachim Trier	Nominated	
Washington D.C. Area Film Critics Association	7 December 2025	Best International/Foreign Language Film	Sentimental Value	Won	
Washington D.C. Area Film Critics Association	7 December 2025	Best Acting Ensemble	Sentimental Value	Nominated	

== See also ==
- List of Cannes Film Festival records § Longest standing ovations
- List of submissions to the 98th Academy Awards for Best International Feature Film
- List of Norwegian submissions for the Academy Award for Best International Feature Film
- List of Nordic Academy Award winners and nominees
