= List of accolades received by Marty Supreme =

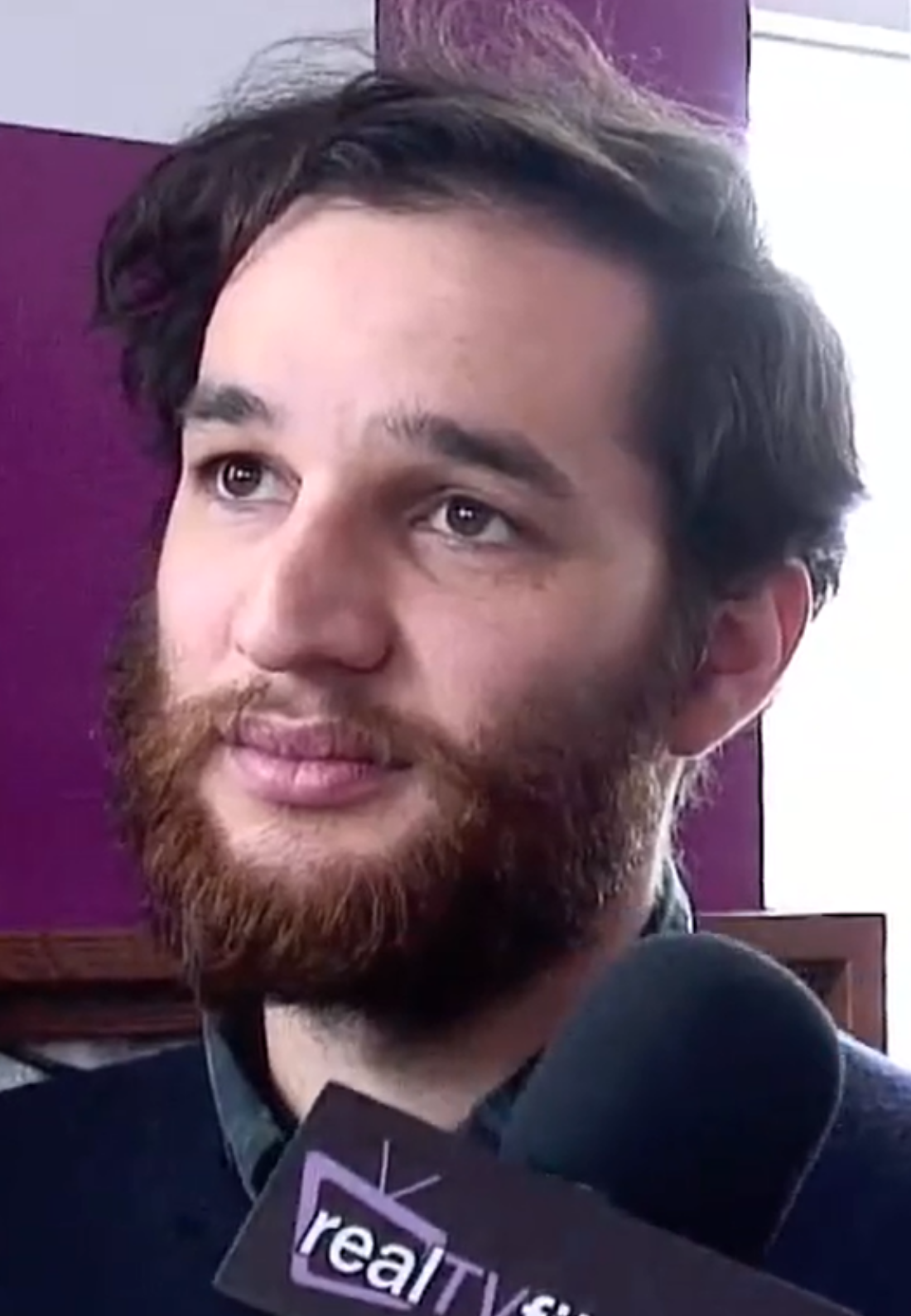
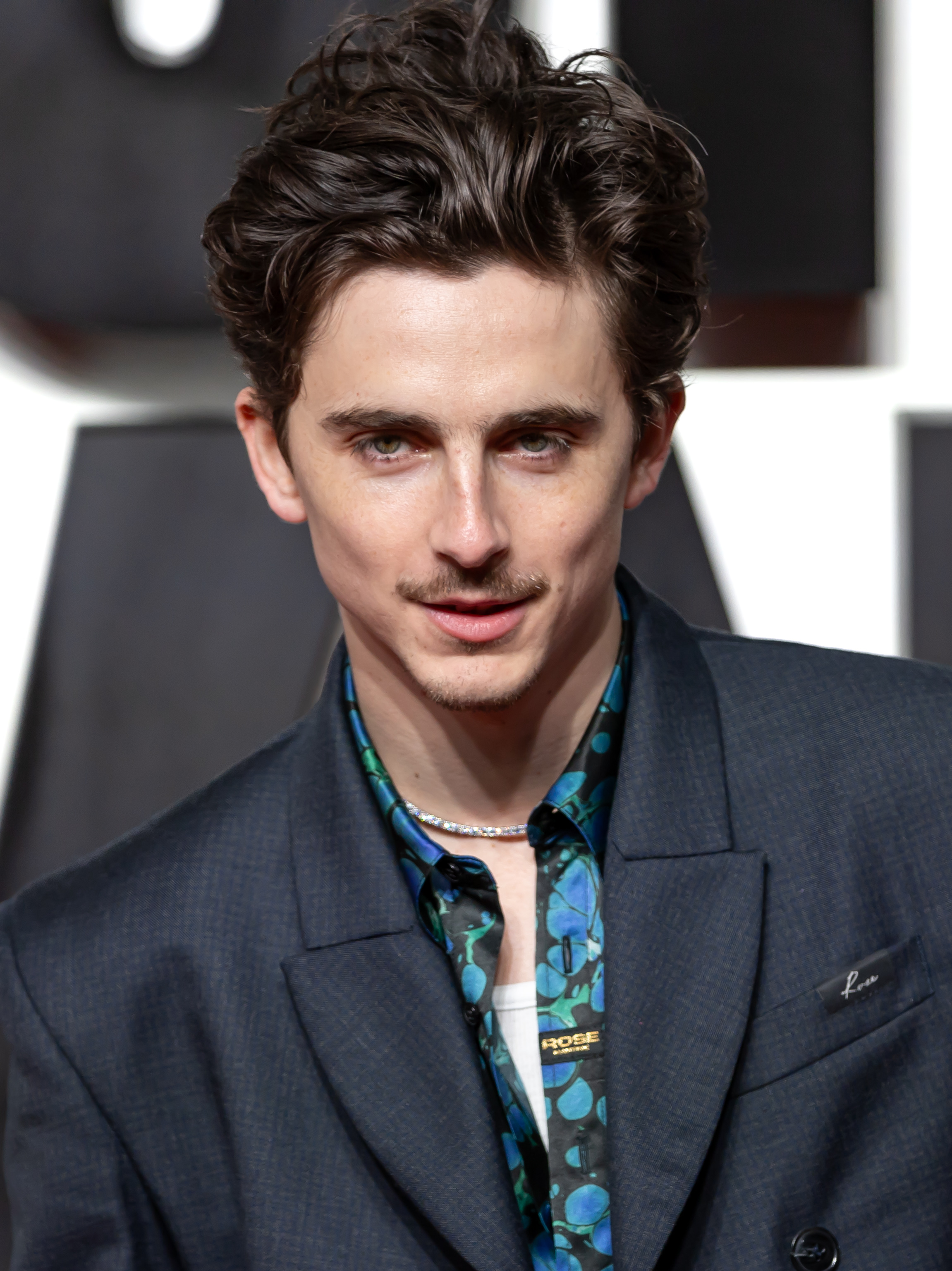
- The film received critical acclaim, with particular praise towards director Josh Safdie and actor Timothée Chalamet.
Accolades
Award	Wins	Nominations
AACTA International Awards	1	4
AARP Movies for Grownups Awards	0	2
Academy Awards	0	9
Actor Awards	0	3
American Cinema Editors Awards	0	1
American Film Institute Awards	1	1
American Society of Cinematographers	0	1
Art Directors Guild	0	1
Artios Awards	0	1
Astra Film and Creative Arts Awards	1	9
Austin Film Critics Association	2	8
Boston Society of Film Critics	1	1
British Academy Film Awards	0	11
British Society of Cinematographers	0	1
Chicago Film Critics Association	1	7
Critics Choice Awards	1	8
Dallas–Fort Worth Film Critics Association	0	4
Directors Guild of America	0	1
Dorian Awards	0	6
Florida Film Critics Circle	0	1
Georgia Film Critics Association	1	5
Golden Globe Awards	1	3
Guild of Music Supervisors Awards	0	1
Hollywood Music in Media Awards	0	1
Houston Film Critics Society	0	7
International Cinephile Society	0	7
Kansas City Film Critics Circle	0	3
London Film Critics' Circle	1	6
Los Angeles Film Critics Association	2	2
National Board of Review	1	1
New York Film Critics Circle	1	1
New York Film Critics Online	0	8
Palm Springs International Film Festival	1	1
Phoenix Film Critics Society	1	1
Producers Guild of America	0	1
San Diego Film Critics Society	1	5
San Francisco Bay Area Film Critics Circle	0	2
Satellite Awards	2	6
Seattle Film Critics Society	0	6
Set Decorators Society of America	0	1
Southeastern Film Critics Association	1	1
St. Louis Film Critics Association	0	5
Toronto Film Critics Association	0	1
Vancouver Film Critics Circle	1	2
Washington D.C. Area Film Critics Association	0	8
Women Film Critics Circle	0	2
Writers Guild of America Awards	0	1

Marty Supreme is a 2025 American sports comedy-drama film produced, written and directed by Josh Safdie and co-written by Ronald Bronstein. The film is loosely based on American table tennis player Marty Reisman.

Set in 1952 New York City, the film stars Timothée Chalamet as professional table tennis player and hustler Marty Mauser, and chronicles his journey to secure enough money to attend the World Table Tennis Championships in Japan. The ensemble cast includes Gwyneth Paltrow, Odessa A'zion, Kevin O'Leary, Tyler Okonma, Abel Ferrara, and Fran Drescher. The film premiered as the "secret screening" at the New York Film Festival on October 6, 2025, and was released in the United States by A24 on December 25, 2025. Marty Supreme received widespread acclaim and has grossed over $180 million worldwide, becoming A24's highest-grossing film.

Both the National Board of Review and the American Film Institute listed it among the top ten films of 2025, and it received several accolades, including eight nominations at the 31st Critics' Choice Awards, three nominations at the 83rd Golden Globe Awards and 32nd Actor Awards, eleven nominations at the 79th British Academy Film Awards and nine nominations at the 98th Academy Awards. Chalamet's performance has been universally praised and described as "career-best" and "career-defining". He has been awarded several accolades, including a Golden Globe Award and Critics' Choice Award for Best Actor.

== Accolades ==
Award	Date of ceremony	Category	Recipient(s)	Result	Ref.
AACTA International Awards	February 6, 2026	Best Film	Marty Supreme	Nominated	
AACTA International Awards	February 6, 2026	Best Direction	Josh Safdie	Nominated	
AACTA International Awards	February 6, 2026	Best Actor	Timothée Chalamet	Won	
AACTA International Awards	February 6, 2026	Best Screenplay	Josh Safdie and Ronald Bronstein	Nominated	
AARP Movies for Grownups Awards	January 10, 2026	Best Period Film	Marty Supreme	Nominated	
AARP Movies for Grownups Awards	January 10, 2026	Best Supporting Actress	Gwyneth Paltrow	Nominated	
Academy Awards	March 15, 2026	Best Picture	Eli Bush, Ronald Bronstein, Josh Safdie, Anthony Katagas, Timothée Chalamet	Nominated	
Academy Awards	March 15, 2026	Best Director	Josh Safdie	Nominated	
Academy Awards	March 15, 2026	Best Actor	Timothée Chalamet	Nominated	
Academy Awards	March 15, 2026	Best Original Screenplay	Josh Safdie and Ronald Bronstein	Nominated	
Academy Awards	March 15, 2026	Best Casting	Jennifer Venditti	Nominated	
Academy Awards	March 15, 2026	Best Cinematography	Darius Khondji	Nominated	
Academy Awards	March 15, 2026	Best Production Design	Production Design: Jack Fisk; Set Decoration: Adam Willis	Nominated	
Academy Awards	March 15, 2026	Best Editing	Josh Safdie and Ronald Bronstein	Nominated	
Academy Awards	March 15, 2026	Best Costume Design	Miyako Bellizzi	Nominated	
Actor Awards	March 1, 2026	Outstanding Performance by a Cast in a Motion Picture	Odessa A'zion, Sandra Bernhard, Timothée Chalamet, Emory Cohen, Fran Drescher, Abel Ferrara, Penn Jillette, Koto Kawaguchi, Luke Manley, Tyler Okonma, Kevin O'Leary, Gwyneth Paltrow, Géza Röhrig, Larry Sloman	Nominated	
Actor Awards	March 1, 2026	Outstanding Performance by a Male Actor in a Leading Role	Timothée Chalamet	Nominated	
Actor Awards	March 1, 2026	Outstanding Performance by a Female Actor in a Supporting Role	Odessa A'zion	Nominated	
American Cinema Editors Awards	February 27, 2026	Best Edited Feature Film (Comedy, Theatrical)	Josh Safdie and Ronald Bronstein	Nominated	
American Film Institute Awards	December 4, 2025	Top Ten Films	Marty Supreme	Honored	
American Society of Cinematographers	March 8, 2026	Outstanding Achievement in Cinematography in Theatrical Releases	Darius Khondji	Nominated	
Art Directors Guild Awards	February 28, 2026	Excellence in Production Design for a Period Film	Jack Fisk	Nominated	
Artios Awards	February 26, 2026	Big Budget Feature Casting – Drama	Jennifer Venditti, Alan Scott Neal, Ko Iwagami	Nominated	
Astra Film Awards	January 9, 2026	Best Picture - Comedy or Musical	Marty Supreme	Nominated	
Astra Film Awards	January 9, 2026	Best Director	Josh Safdie	Nominated	
Astra Film Awards	January 9, 2026	Best Actor - Comedy or Musical	Timothée Chalamet	Won	
Astra Film Awards	January 9, 2026	Best Supporting Actress - Comedy or Musical	Odessa A'zion	Nominated	
Astra Film Awards	January 9, 2026	Best Supporting Actress - Comedy or Musical	Gwyneth Paltrow	Nominated	
Astra Film Awards	January 9, 2026	Best Original Screenplay	Josh Safdie and Ronald Bronstein	Nominated	
Astra Creative Arts Awards	December 11, 2025	Best Casting	Jennifer Venditti	Nominated	
Astra Creative Arts Awards	December 11, 2025	Best Cinematography	Darius Khondji	Nominated	
Astra Creative Arts Awards	December 11, 2025	Best Film Editing	Josh Safdie and Ronald Bronstein	Nominated	
Atlanta Film Critics Circle	December 3, 2025	Top Ten Films	Marty Supreme	5th place	
Austin Film Critics Association	December 18, 2025	Best Film	Marty Supreme	Nominated	
Austin Film Critics Association	December 18, 2025	Best Director	Josh Safdie	Nominated	
Austin Film Critics Association	December 18, 2025	Best Actor	Timothée Chalamet	Won	
Austin Film Critics Association	December 18, 2025	Best Supporting Actress	Odessa A'zion	Nominated	
Austin Film Critics Association	December 18, 2025	Best Original Screenplay	Josh Safdie and Ronald Bronstein	Won	
Austin Film Critics Association	December 18, 2025	Best Cinematography	Darius Khondji	Nominated	
Austin Film Critics Association	December 18, 2025	Best Editing	Josh Safdie and Ronald Bronstein	Nominated	
Austin Film Critics Association	December 18, 2025	Best Ensemble	Marty Supreme	Nominated	
Boston Society of Film Critics	December 14, 2025	Best Ensemble Cast	Marty Supreme	Won	
British Academy Film Awards	February 22, 2026	Best Film	Eli Bush, Ronald Bronstein, Josh Safdie, Anthony Katagas, and Timothée Chalamet	Nominated	
British Academy Film Awards	February 22, 2026	Best Director	Josh Safdie	Nominated	
British Academy Film Awards	February 22, 2026	Best Actor in a Leading Role	Timothée Chalamet	Nominated	
British Academy Film Awards	February 22, 2026	Best Actress in a Supporting Role	Odessa A'zion	Nominated	
British Academy Film Awards	February 22, 2026	Best Original Screenplay	Josh Safdie and Ronald Bronstein	Nominated	
British Academy Film Awards	February 22, 2026	Best Casting	Jennifer Venditti	Nominated	
British Academy Film Awards	February 22, 2026	Best Cinematography	Darius Khondji	Nominated	
British Academy Film Awards	February 22, 2026	Best Costume Design	Miyako Bellizzi	Nominated	
British Academy Film Awards	February 22, 2026	Best Editing	Josh Safdie and Ronald Bronstein	Nominated	
British Academy Film Awards	February 22, 2026	Best Make Up & Hair	Kyra Panchenko, Kay Georgiou, and Mike Fontaine	Nominated	
British Academy Film Awards	February 22, 2026	Best Production Design	Production Design: Jack Fisk; Set Decoration: Adam Willis	Nominated	
British Society of Cinematographers	February 7, 2026	Cinematography in a Feature Film	Darius Khondji	Nominated	
Chicago Film Critics Association	December 11, 2025	Best Film	Marty Supreme	Nominated	
Chicago Film Critics Association	December 11, 2025	Best Director	Josh Safdie	Nominated	
Chicago Film Critics Association	December 11, 2025	Best Actor	Timothée Chalamet	Won	
Chicago Film Critics Association	December 11, 2025	Best Supporting Actress	Odessa A'zion	Nominated	
Chicago Film Critics Association	December 11, 2025	Best Original Screenplay	Josh Safdie and Ronald Bronstein	Nominated	
Chicago Film Critics Association	December 11, 2025	Best Editing	Josh Safdie and Ronald Bronstein	Nominated	
Chicago Film Critics Association	December 11, 2025	Best Production Design	Jack Fisk and Adam Willis	Nominated	
Critics' Choice Awards	January 4, 2026	Best Picture	Marty Supreme	Nominated	
Critics' Choice Awards	January 4, 2026	Best Director	Josh Safdie	Nominated	
Critics' Choice Awards	January 4, 2026	Best Actor	Timothée Chalamet	Won	
Critics' Choice Awards	January 4, 2026	Best Casting and Ensemble	Jennifer Venditti	Nominated	
Critics' Choice Awards	January 4, 2026	Best Original Screenplay	Josh Safdie and Ronald Bronstein	Nominated	
Critics' Choice Awards	January 4, 2026	Best Editing	Josh Safdie and Ronald Bronstein	Nominated	
Critics' Choice Awards	January 4, 2026	Best Production Design	Jack Fisk and Adam Willis	Nominated	
Critics' Choice Awards	January 4, 2026	Best Score	Daniel Lopatin	Nominated	
Dallas–Fort Worth Film Critics Association	December 17, 2025	Best Picture	Marty Supreme	3rd Place	
Dallas–Fort Worth Film Critics Association	December 17, 2025	Best Director	Josh Safdie	4th Place	
Dallas–Fort Worth Film Critics Association	December 17, 2025	Best Actor	Timothée Chalamet	2nd Place	
Dallas–Fort Worth Film Critics Association	December 17, 2025	Best Supporting Actress	Odessa A'zion	4th Place	
Directors Guild of America Awards	February 7, 2026	Outstanding Directing – Feature Film	Josh Safdie	Nominated	
Dorian Awards	March 3, 2026	Film of the Year	Marty Supreme	Nominated	
Dorian Awards	March 3, 2026	Director of the Year	Josh Safdie	Nominated	
Dorian Awards	March 3, 2026	Film Performance of the Year	Timothée Chalamet	Nominated	
Dorian Awards	March 3, 2026	Rising Star of the Year	Odessa A'zion	Nominated	
Dorian Awards	March 3, 2026	Screenplay of the Year	Josh Safdie and Ronald Bronstein	Nominated	
Dorian Awards	March 3, 2026	Film Music of the Year	Daniel Lopatin	Nominated	
Florida Film Critics Circle	December 19, 2025	Best Actor	Timothée Chalamet	Nominated	
Georgia Film Critics Association	December 27, 2025	Best Picture	Marty Supreme	Nominated	
Georgia Film Critics Association	December 27, 2025	Best Actor	Timothée Chalamet	Won	
Georgia Film Critics Association	December 27, 2025	Best Original Screenplay	Josh Safdie and Ronald Bronstein	Nominated	
Georgia Film Critics Association	December 27, 2025	Best Production Design	Jack Fisk and Adam Willis	Nominated	
Georgia Film Critics Association	December 27, 2025	Best Ensemble	Marty Supreme	Nominated	
Golden Globe Awards	January 11, 2026	Best Motion Picture – Musical or Comedy	Marty Supreme	Nominated	
Golden Globe Awards	January 11, 2026	Best Actor in a Motion Picture – Musical or Comedy	Timothée Chalamet	Won	
Golden Globe Awards	January 11, 2026	Best Screenplay	Josh Safdie and Ronald Bronstein	Nominated	
Guild of Music Supervisors Awards	February 28, 2026	Best Music Supervision in Mid-Level Budget Films	Gabe Hilfer	Nominated	
Hollywood Music in Media Awards	November 19, 2025	Best Original Score in a Feature Film	Daniel Lopatin	Nominated	
Houston Film Critics Society	January 20, 2026	Best Picture	Marty Supreme	Nominated	
Houston Film Critics Society	January 20, 2026	Best Director	Josh Safdie	Nominated	
Houston Film Critics Society	January 20, 2026	Best Actor	Timothée Chalamet	Nominated	
Houston Film Critics Society	January 20, 2026	Best Screenplay	Josh Safdie and Ronald Bronstein	Nominated	
Houston Film Critics Society	January 20, 2026	Best Original Score	Daniel Lopatin	Nominated	
Houston Film Critics Society	January 20, 2026	Best Casting	Jennifer Venditti	Nominated	
Houston Film Critics Society	January 20, 2026	Best Ensemble	Marty Supreme	Nominated	
International Cinephile Society	February 8, 2026	Best Picture	Marty Supreme	Nominated	
International Cinephile Society	February 8, 2026	Best Actor	Timothée Chalamet	Nominated	
International Cinephile Society	February 8, 2026	Best Ensemble	Marty Supreme	Nominated	
International Cinephile Society	February 8, 2026	Best Original Screenplay	Josh Safdie and Ronald Bronstein	Nominated	
International Cinephile Society	February 8, 2026	Best Editing	Josh Safdie and Ronald Bronstein	Nominated	
International Cinephile Society	February 8, 2026	Best Production Design	Jack Fisk	Nominated	
International Cinephile Society	February 8, 2026	Best Score	Daniel Lopatin	Nominated	
Kansas City Film Critics Circle	December 21, 2025	Best Film	Marty Supreme	Nominated	
Kansas City Film Critics Circle	December 21, 2025	Best Actor	Timothée Chalamet	Nominated	
Kansas City Film Critics Circle	December 21, 2025	Best Original Screenplay	Josh Safdie and Ronald Bronstein	Nominated	
London Film Critics Circle	February 1, 2026	Film of the Year	Marty Supreme	Nominated	
London Film Critics Circle	February 1, 2026	Director of the Year	Josh Safdie	Nominated	
London Film Critics Circle	February 1, 2026	Actor of the Year	Timothée Chalamet	Won	
London Film Critics Circle	February 1, 2026	Supporting Actress of the Year	Odessa A'zion	Nominated	
London Film Critics Circle	February 1, 2026	Screenwriter of the Year	Josh Safdie and Ronald Bronstein	Nominated	
London Film Critics Circle	February 1, 2026	Technical Achievement Award	Casting (Jennifer Venditti)	Nominated	
Los Angeles Film Critics Association	December 7, 2025	Best Lead Performance	Timothée Chalamet	Runner-up (Note: Shared with Wagner Moura for The Secret Agent.)	
Los Angeles Film Critics Association	December 7, 2025	Best Editing	Josh Safdie and Ronald Bronstein	Won	
National Board of Review	December 3, 2025	Top Ten Films	Marty Supreme	Honored	
New York Film Critics Circle	January 6, 2026	Best Screenplay	Josh Safdie and Ronald Bronstein	Won	
New York Film Critics Online	December 15, 2025	Best Picture	Marty Supreme	Nominated	
New York Film Critics Online	December 15, 2025	Best Director	Josh Safdie	Nominated	
New York Film Critics Online	December 15, 2025	Best Actor	Timothée Chalamet	Runner-up	
New York Film Critics Online	December 15, 2025	Best Supporting Actress	Odessa A'zion	Nominated	
New York Film Critics Online	December 15, 2025	Best Screenplay	Josh Safdie and Ronald Bronstein	Nominated	
New York Film Critics Online	December 15, 2025	Best Ensemble Cast	Jennifer Venditti	Nominated	
New York Film Critics Online	December 15, 2025	Best Use of Music	Marty Supreme	Nominated	
New York Film Critics Online	December 15, 2025	Best Breakthrough Performer	Odessa A'zion	Nominated	
Palm Springs International Film Festival	January 3, 2026	Spotlight Award	Timothée Chalamet	Won	
Phoenix Film Critics Society	December 15, 2025	Top Ten Films	Marty Supreme	Won	
Producers Guild of America Awards	February 28, 2026	Darryl F. Zanuck Award for Outstanding Producer of Theatrical Motion Pictures	Eli Bush, Ronald Bronstein, Josh Safdie, Anthony Katagas, Timothée Chalamet	Nominated	
San Diego Film Critics Society	December 15, 2025	Best Picture	Marty Supreme	Nominated	
San Diego Film Critics Society	December 15, 2025	Best Actor	Timothée Chalamet	Nominated	
San Diego Film Critics Society	December 15, 2025	Best Supporting Actress	Odessa A'zion	Nominated	
San Diego Film Critics Society	December 15, 2025	Best Editing	Josh Safdie and Ronald Bronstein	Won	
San Diego Film Critics Society	December 15, 2025	Best Use of Music	Marty Supreme	Nominated	
San Francisco Bay Area Film Critics Circle	December 14, 2025	Best Film Editing	Josh Safdie and Ronald Bronstein	Nominated	
San Francisco Bay Area Film Critics Circle	December 14, 2025	Best Production Design	Jack Fisk	Nominated	
Satellite Awards	March 10, 2026	Best Motion Picture – Comedy or Musical	Marty Supreme	Won	
Satellite Awards	March 10, 2026	Best Actor in a Motion Picture – Comedy or Musical	Timothée Chalamet	Won	
Satellite Awards	March 10, 2026	Best Original Screenplay	Josh Safdie and Ronald Bronstein	Nominated	
Satellite Awards	March 10, 2026	Best Film Editing	Josh Safdie and Ronald Bronstein	Nominated	
Satellite Awards	March 10, 2026	Best Costume Design	Miyako Bellizzi	Nominated	
Satellite Awards	March 10, 2026	Best Production Design	Jack Fisk and Adam Willis	Nominated	
Seattle Film Critics Society	December 15, 2025	Best Picture	Marty Supreme	Nominated	
Seattle Film Critics Society	December 15, 2025	Best Director	Josh Safdie	Nominated	
Seattle Film Critics Society	December 15, 2025	Best Actor in a Leading Role	Timothée Chalamet	Nominated	
Seattle Film Critics Society	December 15, 2025	Best Ensemble Cast	Jennifer Venditti	Nominated	
Seattle Film Critics Society	December 15, 2025	Best Screenplay	Josh Safdie and Ronald Bronstein	Nominated	
Seattle Film Critics Society	December 15, 2025	Best Editing	Josh Safdie and Ronald Bronstein	Nominated	
Set Decorators Society of America	February 21, 2026	Best Achievement in Décor/Design of a Period Feature Film	Jack Fisk, Adam Willis	Nominated	
Southeastern Film Critics Association	December 16, 2025	Top Ten Films	Marty Supreme	3rd Place	
St. Louis Film Critics Association	December 14, 2025	Best Film	Marty Supreme	Nominated	
St. Louis Film Critics Association	December 14, 2025	Best Director	Josh Safdie	Nominated	
St. Louis Film Critics Association	December 14, 2025	Best Actor	Timothée Chalamet	Runner-up	
St. Louis Film Critics Association	December 14, 2025	Best Original Screenplay	Josh Safdie and Ronald Bronstein	Nominated	
St. Louis Film Critics Association	December 14, 2025	Best Editing	Josh Safdie and Ronald Bronstein	Nominated	
Toronto Film Critics Association	December 7, 2025	Best Original Screenplay	Josh Safdie and Ronald Bronstein	Runner-up	
Vancouver Film Critics Circle	February 23, 2026	Best Picture	Marty Supreme	Nominated	
Vancouver Film Critics Circle	February 23, 2026	Best Male Actor	Timothée Chalamet	Won	
Washington D.C. Area Film Critics Association	December 7, 2025	Best Film	Marty Supreme	Nominated	
Washington D.C. Area Film Critics Association	December 7, 2025	Best Director	Josh Safdie	Nominated	
Washington D.C. Area Film Critics Association	December 7, 2025	Best Actor	Timothée Chalamet	Nominated	
Washington D.C. Area Film Critics Association	December 7, 2025	Best Ensemble	Jennifer Venditti	Nominated	
Washington D.C. Area Film Critics Association	December 7, 2025	Best Original Screenplay	Josh Safdie and Ronald Bronstein	Nominated	
Washington D.C. Area Film Critics Association	December 7, 2025	Best Cinematography	Darius Khondji	Nominated	
Washington D.C. Area Film Critics Association	December 7, 2025	Best Editing	Josh Safdie and Ronald Bronstein	Nominated	
Washington D.C. Area Film Critics Association	December 7, 2025	Best Score	Daniel Lopatin	Nominated	
Women Film Critics Circle	December 21, 2025	Best Actor	Timothée Chalamet	Nominated	
Women Film Critics Circle	December 21, 2025	Best Supporting Actress	Odessa A'zion	Nominated	
Writers Guild of America Awards	March 8, 2026	Best Original Screenplay	Josh Safdie and Ronald Bronstein	Nominated	
