= List of accolades received by Weapons (2025 film) =

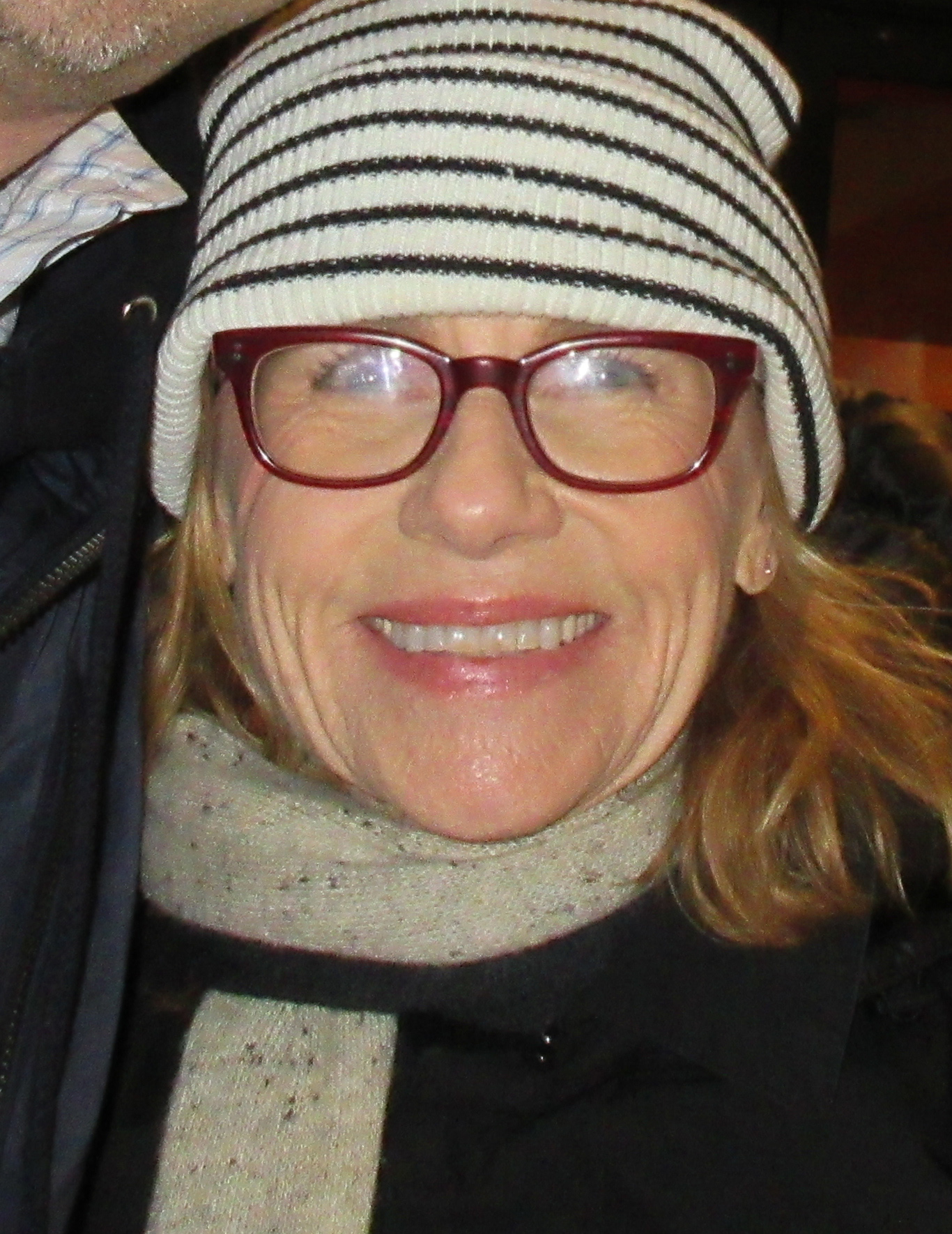
- Amy Madigan's performance brought her widespread acclaim and many plaudits, including the Academy Award for Best Supporting Actress.
Awards and nominations
Award	Wins	Nominations
AACTA International Awards	1	1
AARP Movies for Grownups Awards	0	1
Academy Awards	1	1
Actor Awards	1	1
Alliance of Women Film Journalists	0	1
Astra Film and Creative Arts Awards	3	8
Austin Film Critics Association	1	4
Boston Society of Film Critics	1	1
Chicago Film Critics Association	0	1
Costume Designers Guild Awards	0	1
Critics Choice Awards	1	4
Dallas–Fort Worth Film Critics Association	0	1
Dorian Awards	2	3
Florida Film Critics Circle	0	1
Georgia Film Critics Association	2	4
Golden Globe Awards	0	2
Golden Tomato Awards	0	3
Houston Film Critics Society	1	2
Kansas City Film Critics Circle	2	4
London Film Critics' Circle	1	3
Make-Up Artists & Hair Stylists Guild Awards	0	3
New York Film Critics Circle	1	1
Online Film Critics Society	1	4
Producers Guild of America Awards	0	1
San Diego Film Critics Society	2	4
San Francisco Bay Area Film Critics Circle	1	2
Santa Barbara International Film Festival	1	1
Satellite Awards	0	1
Saturn Awards	0	5
Seattle Film Critics Society	1	4
St. Louis Film Critics Association	3	6
Toronto Film Critics Association	0	1
Vancouver Film Critics Circle	0	3
Washington D.C. Area Film Critics Association	0	2
Writers Guild of America Awards	0	1

Totals (Note: Certain award groups do not simply award one winner. They acknowledge several different recipients, have runners-up, and have third place. Since this is a specific recognition and is different from losing an award, runner-up mentions are considered wins in this award tally. For simplification and to avoid errors, each award in this list has been presumed to have had a prior nomination.)
- Wins: 61
- Nominations: 183

Numerous critical and industry groups have acclaimed Weapons, a 2025 American supernatural mystery horror film, directed, written, produced, and co-scored by Zach Cregger. The film garnered many awards and nominations in various categories with particular recognition for its writing, make-up, and performances.

Weapons was shortlisted for the Academy Award's newest category of "Best Casting" for the 98th ceremony. It marks Madigan's first Academy Award nomination since 1986, marking the longest between two nominations for an actress.

== Accolades ==
Award	Date	Category	Recipient(s)	Result	Ref.
AACTA International Awards	February 6, 2026	Best Supporting Actress	Amy Madigan	Won	
AARP Movies for Grownups Awards	January 10, 2026	Best Supporting Actress	Amy Madigan	Nominated	
Academy Awards	March 15, 2026	Best Supporting Actress	Amy Madigan	Won	
Actor Awards	March 1, 2026	Outstanding Performance by a Female Actor in a Supporting Role	Amy Madigan	Won	
Alliance of Women Film Journalists	December 31, 2025	Best Supporting Actress	Amy Madigan	Nominated	
Astra Film Awards	January 9, 2026	Best Actress – Drama	Julia Garner	Nominated	
Astra Film Awards	January 9, 2026	Best Supporting Actress – Drama	Amy Madigan	Won	
Astra Film Awards	January 9, 2026	Best Original Screenplay	Zach Cregger	Nominated	
Astra Film Awards	January 9, 2026	Best Voice Over Performance	Scarlett Sher	Nominated	
Astra Film Awards	January 9, 2026	Best Horror or Thriller Feature	Weapons	Won	
Astra Film Awards	December 11, 2025	Best Makeup and Hairstyling	Leo Satkovich, Melizah Wheat and Jason Collins	Nominated	
Astra Film Awards	December 11, 2025	Best Marketing Campaign	Weapons	Won	
Astra Film Awards	December 11, 2025	Best Second Unit Director	Townson Wells	Nominated	
Astra Midseason Movie Awards	July 3, 2025	Most Anticipated Film	Weapons	Runner-up	
Austin Film Critics Association	December 18, 2025	Best Picture	Weapons	Nominated	
Austin Film Critics Association	December 18, 2025	Best Supporting Actress	Amy Madigan	Won	
Austin Film Critics Association	December 18, 2025	Best Original Screenplay	Zach Cregger	Nominated	
Austin Film Critics Association	December 18, 2025	Best Editing	Joe Murphy	Nominated	
Boston Society of Film Critics	December 14, 2025	Best Supporting Actress	Amy Madigan	Won	
Chicago Film Critics Association	December 11, 2025	Best Supporting Actress	Amy Madigan	Nominated	
Costume Designers Guild	February 12, 2026	Excellence in Contemporary Film	Trish Summerville	Nominated	
Critics' Choice Movie Awards	January 4, 2026	Best Supporting Actress	Amy Madigan	Won	
Critics' Choice Movie Awards	January 4, 2026	Best Young Actor/Actress	Cary Christopher	Nominated	
Critics' Choice Movie Awards	January 4, 2026	Best Original Screenplay	Zach Cregger	Nominated	
Critics' Choice Movie Awards	January 4, 2026	Best Hair and Make-Up	Leo Satkovich, Melizah Wheat, and Jason Collins	Nominated	
Critics' Choice Super Awards	August 6, 2026	Best Horror Movie	Weapons	Nominated	
Critics' Choice Super Awards	August 6, 2026	Best Actor in a Horror Movie	Josh Brolin	Nominated	
Critics' Choice Super Awards	August 6, 2026	Best Actress in a Horror Movie	Amy Madigan	Nominated	
Critics' Choice Super Awards	August 6, 2026	Best Villain in a Movie	Amy Madigan	Won	
Dallas–Fort Worth Film Critics Association	December 17, 2025	Best Supporting Actress	Amy Madigan	Runner-up	
Dorian Awards	March 3, 2026	Supporting Film Performance of the Year	Amy Madigan	Won	
Dorian Awards	March 3, 2026	Genre Film of the Year	Weapons	Nominated	
Dorian Awards	March 3, 2026	Campiest Flick	Weapons	Won	
Fangoria Chainsaw Awards	October 25, 2026	Best Wide Release	Weapons	Nominated	
Fangoria Chainsaw Awards	October 25, 2026	Best Director	Zach Cregger	Nominated	
Fangoria Chainsaw Awards	October 25, 2026	Best Screenplay	Zach Cregger	Nominated	
Fangoria Chainsaw Awards	October 25, 2026	Best Supporting Performance	Amy Madigan	Won	
Florida Film Critics Circle	December 19, 2025	Best Supporting Actress	Amy Madigan	Nominated	
Georgia Film Critics Association	December 27, 2025	Best Picture	Weapons	Nominated	
Georgia Film Critics Association	December 27, 2025	Best Supporting Actress	Amy Madigan	Won	
Georgia Film Critics Association	December 27, 2025	Best Original Screenplay	Zach Cregger	Nominated	
Georgia Film Critics Association	December 27, 2025	Oglethorpe Award for Excellence in Georgia Cinema	Weapons	Won	
Golden Globe Awards	January 11, 2026	Best Supporting Actress in a Motion Picture	Amy Madigan	Nominated	
Golden Globe Awards	January 11, 2026	Cinematic and Box Office Achievement	Weapons	Nominated	
Golden tomato awards	january 13,2026	Best movies	weapons	Nominated	
Golden tomato awards	january 13,2026	Best horror movies	weapons	Nominated	
Golden tomato awards	january 13,2026	Most relatable villain	Amy maligans as aunt gladys	Nominated	
Houston Film Critics Society	January 20, 2026	Best Picture	Weapons	Nominated	
Houston Film Critics Society	January 20, 2026	Best Supporting Actress	Amy Madigan	Won	
Kansas City Film Critics Circle	December 21, 2025	Best Film	Weapons	Nominated	
Kansas City Film Critics Circle	December 21, 2025	Best Supporting Actress	Amy Madigan	Won	
Kansas City Film Critics Circle	December 21, 2025	Best Original Screenplay	Zach Cregger	Won	
Kansas City Film Critics Circle	December 21, 2025	Vince Koehler Award for Best Science Fiction/Fantasy/Horror	Weapons	Nominated	
London Film Critics' Circle	February 1, 2026	Film of the Year	Weapons	Nominated	
London Film Critics' Circle	February 1, 2026	Supporting Actress of the Year	Amy Madigan	Won	
London Film Critics' Circle	February 1, 2026	Technical Achievement	Leo Satkovich, Melizah Wheat and Jason Collins (Makeup and Hairstyling)	Nominated	
Make-Up Artists & Hair Stylists Guild	February 14, 2026	Best Period and/or Character Make-Up in a Feature-Length Motion Picture	Leo Satkovich, Mark Ross, Jason Collins, Kaylee Kehne-Swisher, Brie Bastianson	Nominated	
Make-Up Artists & Hair Stylists Guild	February 14, 2026	Best Period and/or Character Hair Styling in a Feature-Length Motion Picture	Melizah Wheat, Monty Schuth, Nashi Tumlinson	Nominated	
Make-Up Artists & Hair Stylists Guild	February 14, 2026	Best Special Make-Up Effects in a Feature-Length Motion Picture	Jason Collins, Leo Satkovich, Mike McCarty, Mark Ross, Kaylee Kehne-Swisher	Nominated	
New Jersey Film Critics Circle	December 31, 2025	Best Supporting Actress	Amy Madigan	Won	
New York Film Critics Circle	January 6, 2026	Best Supporting Actress	Amy Madigan	Won	
New York Film Critics Online	December 15, 2025	Best Supporting Actress	Amy Madigan	Runner-up	
Online Film Critics Society	January 26, 2026	Best Picture	Weapons	Nominated	
Online Film Critics Society	January 26, 2026	Best Supporting Actress	Amy Madigan	Won	
Online Film Critics Society	January 26, 2026	Best Original Screenplay	Zach Cregger	Nominated	
Online Film Critics Society	January 26, 2026	Best Makeup & Hairstyling	Leo Satkovich, Melizah Wheat and Jason Collins	Nominated	
Producers Guild of America Awards	February 28, 2026	Darryl F. Zanuck Award for Outstanding Producer of Theatrical Motion Pictures	Zach Cregger and Miri Yoon	Nominated	
San Diego Film Critics Society	December 15, 2025	Best Supporting Actress	Amy Madigan	Won	
San Diego Film Critics Society	December 15, 2025	Best Original Screenplay	Zach Cregger	Nominated	
San Diego Film Critics Society	December 15, 2025	Best Ensemble	Weapons	Nominated	
San Diego Film Critics Society	December 15, 2025	Best Youth Performance	Cary Christopher	Won	
San Francisco Bay Area Film Critics Circle	December 14, 2025	Best Supporting Actress	Amy Madigan	Won	
San Francisco Bay Area Film Critics Circle	December 14, 2025	Best Original Screenplay	Zach Cregger	Nominated	
Santa Barbara International Film Festival	February 8, 2026	Virtuosos Award	Amy Madigan	Honored	
Satellite Awards	March 28, 2026	Best Actress in a Supporting Role	Amy Madigan	Nominated	
Saturn Awards	March 8, 2026	Best Horror Film	Weapons	Nominated	
Saturn Awards	March 8, 2026	Best Film Screenwriting	Zach Cregger	Nominated	
Saturn Awards	March 8, 2026	Best Actress in a Film	Julia Garner	Nominated	
Saturn Awards	March 8, 2026	Best Supporting Actress in a Film	Amy Madigan	Nominated	
Saturn Awards	March 8, 2026	Best Film Make Up	Jason Collins, Leo Satkovich, and Melizah Wheat	Nominated	
Screen Awards	December 24, 2025	Best Picture	Weapons	Nominated	
Screen Awards	December 24, 2025	Best Director	Zach Cregger	Nominated	
Screen Awards	December 24, 2025	Best Supporting Performance by an Actress – Film	Amy Madigan	Nominated	
Seattle Film Critics Society	December 15, 2025	Best Picture	Weapons	Nominated	
Seattle Film Critics Society	December 15, 2025	Best Actress in a Supporting Role	Amy Madigan	Nominated	
Seattle Film Critics Society	December 15, 2025	Best Youth Performance	Cary Christopher	Nominated	
Seattle Film Critics Society	December 15, 2025	Villain of the Year	Amy Madigan	Won	
St. Louis Film Critics Association Awards	December 14, 2025	Best Film	Weapons	Nominated	
St. Louis Film Critics Association Awards	December 14, 2025	Best Supporting Actress	Amy Madigan	Won	
St. Louis Film Critics Association Awards	December 14, 2025	Best Original Screenplay	Zach Cregger	Won	
St. Louis Film Critics Association Awards	December 14, 2025	Best Vocal Performance	Scarlet Sher	Nominated	
St. Louis Film Critics Association Awards	December 14, 2025	Best Horror Film	Weapons	Won	
St. Louis Film Critics Association Awards	December 14, 2025	Best Scene	The fate of Aunt Gladys	Nominated	
Toronto Film Critics Association	March 2, 2026	Outstanding Supporting Performance	Amy Madigan	Runner-up (Note: Shared with Jacob Elordi for Frankenstein, Sean Penn for One Battle After Another and Stellan Skarsgård for Sentimental Value.)	
Vancouver Film Critics Circle	February 23, 2026	Best Supporting Actress	Amy Madigan	Won	
Washington D.C. Area Film Critics Association	December 7, 2025	Best Supporting Actress	Amy Madigan	Nominated	
Washington D.C. Area Film Critics Association	December 7, 2025	Best Original Screenplay	Zach Cregger	Nominated	
Washington D.C. Area Film Critics Association	December 7, 2025	Best Youth Performance	Cary Christopher	Nominated	
Writers Guild of America Awards	March 8, 2026	Best Original Screenplay	Zach Cregger	Nominated	
