= Women in Oversized Men's Shirts =

2015 Norwegian comedy film

Women In Oversized Men's Shirts
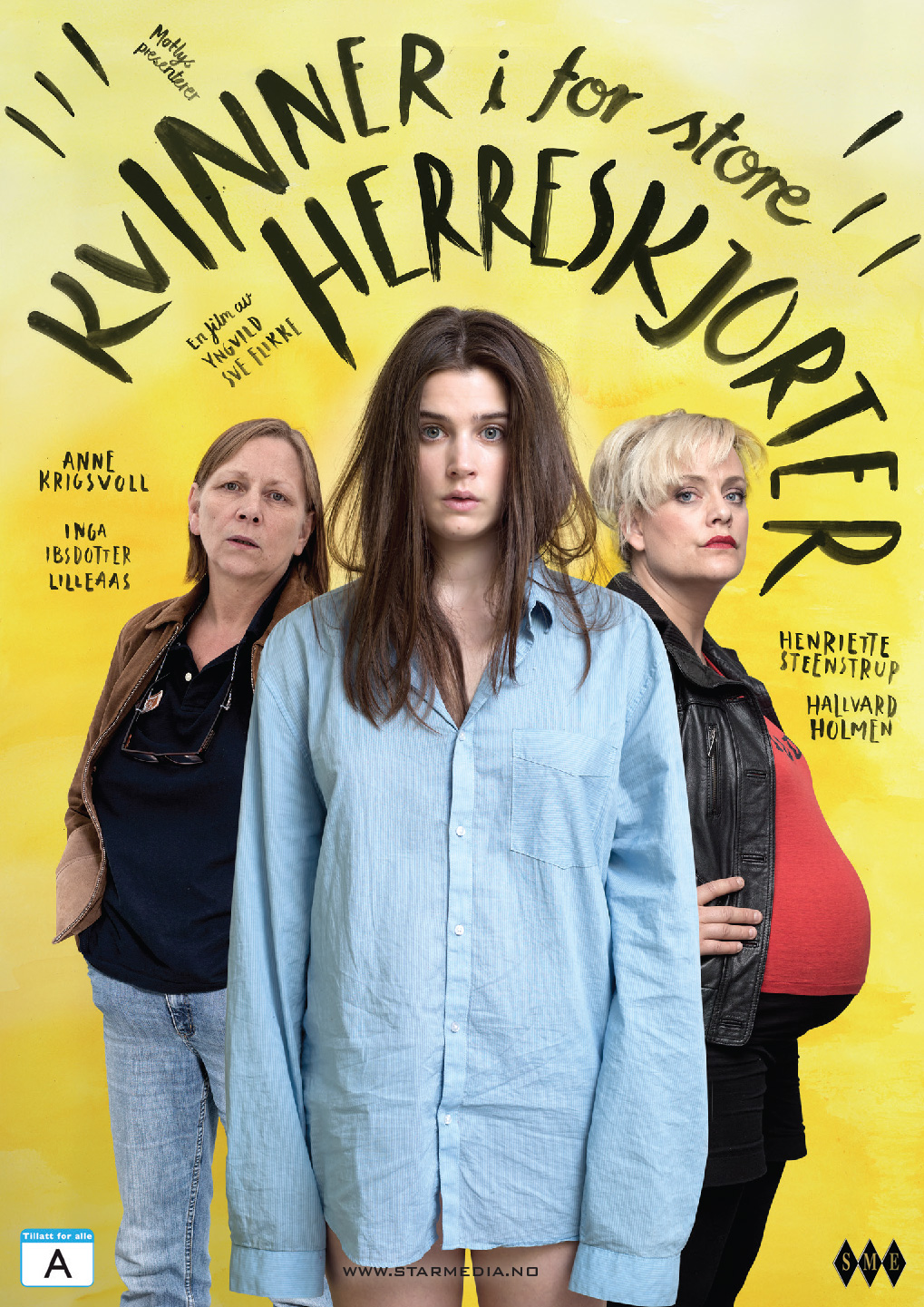
- Promotional Poster
- Directed by: Yngvild Sve Flikke
- Written by: Yngvild Sve Flikke, Gunnhild Øyehaug
- Produced by: Yngve Saether
- Starring: Inga Ibsdotter Lilleaas; Henriette Steenstrup; Anne Krigsvoll; Hallvard Holmen; Ingrid Bolsø Berdal; Renate Reinsve
- Cinematography: Marianne Bakke
- Edited by: Jens Christian Fodstad
- Music by: Kåre Christoffer Vestrheim
- Production company: Counterlight
- Distributed by: Norwegian Film Distribution
- Release date: 6 March 2015
- Running time: 106 minutes
- Country: Norway
- Language: Norwegian

Women In Oversized Men's Shirts is a 2015 Norwegian language romantic comedy film starring Inga Ibsdotter Lilleaas. The film is directed by Yngvild Sve Flikke, with a screenplay co-written by Flikke and Gunnhild Øyehaug based on Øyehaug's 2008 novel Wait, Blink. The film premiered at the Gothenburg Film Festival.

The film stars Inga Ibsdotter Lilleaas, Henriette Steenstrup, Anne Krigsvoll, Hallvard Holmen, Ingrid Bolsø Berdal, and Renate Reinsve in a small supporting role. For her performance in the film, Ibsdotter Lilleaas was nominated for the Amanda Award for Best Lead Actress, while Krigsvoll won Best Supporting Actress for her performance as Agnes.

== Plot ==
The film tells the story of three women and their different lives. Literature student Sigrid falls in love with the successful author Kåre Tryvle, who is twenty years older than her. Trine is an outspoken performance artist who has prioritized her career over having children, and it is therefore very unfortunate that she has become pregnant. Fortunately, she meets lumberjack Agnes, a writer with writer's block in her forties, who fears that she will soon die and therefore wants to contact her adopted son. One thing the three women have in common is that they are blindly searching to find themselves and attain happiness.

== Cast ==
- Inga Ibsdotter Lilleaas as Sigrid Auge
- Henriette Steenstrup as Trine Jung
- Anne Krigsvoll as Agnes Kalvatn
- Hallvard Holmen as Kåre Tryvle
- Ingrid Bolsø Berdal as Wanda As
- Andreas Ven Langø as Magnus
- Andrea Vik as Elida
- Renate Reinsve as Ane
