= New York Film Critics Online Award for Best Supporting Actress =

Online award by New York Film Critics Online

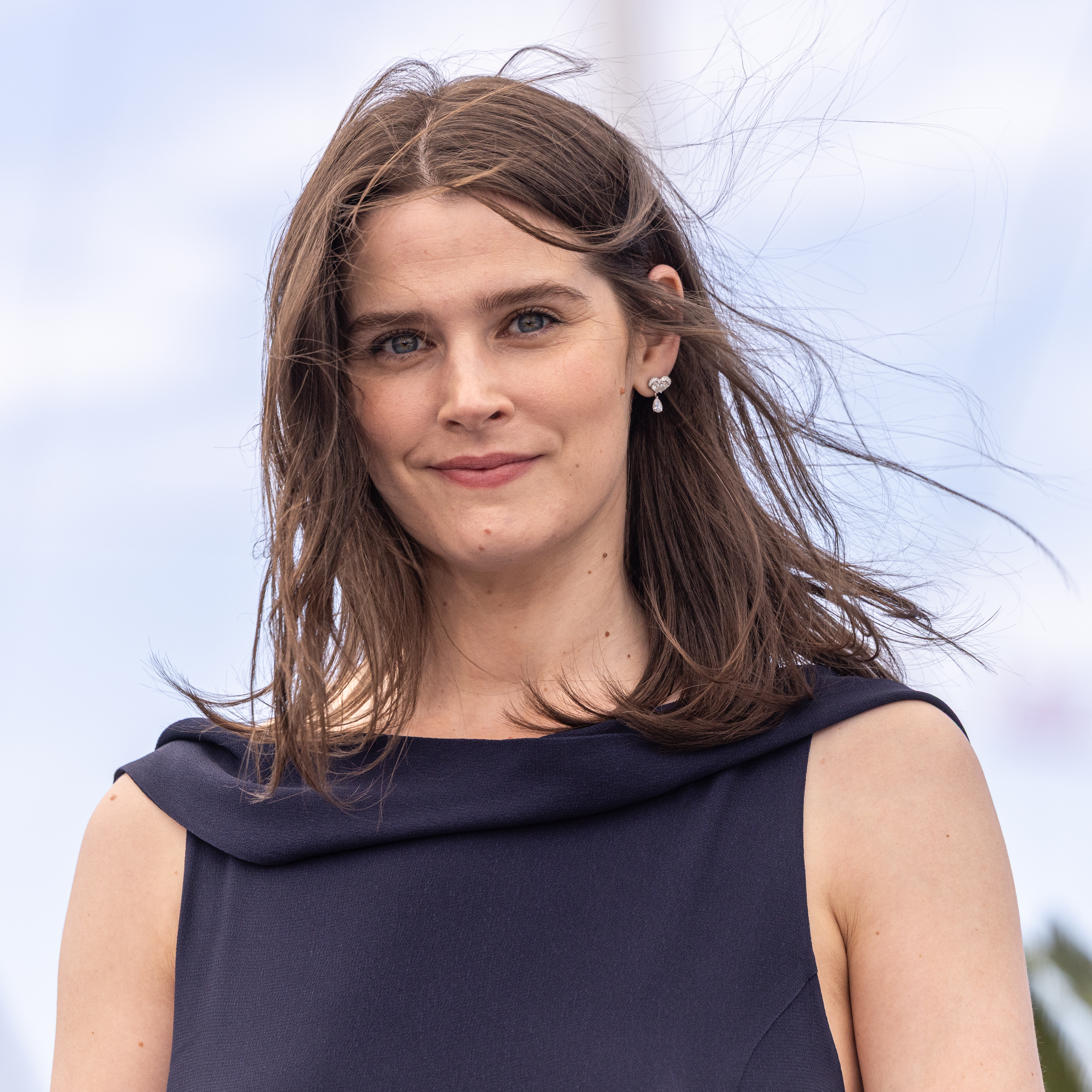
- Current recipient: Inga Ibsdotter Lilleaas
- Country: United States
- Presented by: Los Angeles Film Critics Association
- First award: Maggie Smith; Gosford Park (2001)
- Currently held by: Inga Ibsdotter Lilleaas; Sentimental Value (2025)
- Website: www.nyfco.net

The New York Film Critics Online Award for Best Supporting Actress is an award given annually by the New York Film Critics Online. It was first introduced in 2001, to reward the best performance by a supporting actress.

== Winners ==
=== 2000s ===
Year	Winner(s)	Film	Role
2001	Maggie Smith	Gosford Park	Constance, Countess of Trentham
2002	Edie Falco	Sunshine State	Marly Temple
2003	Scarlett Johansson	Lost in Translation	Charlotte
2004	Virginia Madsen	Sideways	Maya
2005	Amy Adams	Junebug	Ashley Johnsten
2006	Jennifer Hudson	Dreamgirls	Effie White
2006	Catherine O'Hara	For Your Consideration	Marilyn Hack
2007	Cate Blanchett	I'm Not There	Jude Quinn
2008	Penélope Cruz	Vicky Cristina Barcelona	María Elena
2009	Mo'Nique	Precious	Mary Lee Johnston

=== 2010s ===
Year	Winner	Film	Role
2010	Melissa Leo	The Fighter	Alice Eklund-Ward
2011	Melissa McCarthy	Bridesmaids	Megan Price
2012	Anne Hathaway	Les Misérables	Fantine
2013	Lupita Nyong'o	12 Years a Slave	Patsey
2014	Patricia Arquette	Boyhood	Olivia Evans
2015	Rooney Mara	Carol	Therese Belivet
2016	Viola Davis	Fences	Rose Lee Maxson
2017	Allison Janney	I, Tonya	LaVona Golden
2018	Regina King	If Beale Street Could Talk	Sharon Rivers
2019	Laura Dern	Marriage Story	Nora Fanshaw

== Winners ==
=== 2020s ===
Year	Winner(s)	Film	Role
2020	Ellen Burstyn	Pieces of a Woman	Elizabeth Weiss
2020	Youn Yuh-jung	Minari	Soon-ja
2021	Ruth Negga	Passing	Clare Kendry
2022	Hong Chau	The Whale	Liz
2023	Da'Vine Joy Randolph	The Holdovers	Mary Lamb
2024	Natasha Lyonne	His Three Daughters	Rachel
2025	Inga Ibsdotter Lilleaas	Sentimental Value	Agnes Borg-Petterson

== See also ==
- Los Angeles Film Critics Association Award for Best Supporting Actress
- National Board of Review Award for Best Supporting Actress
- New York Film Critics Circle Award for Best Supporting Actress
- National Society of Film Critics Award for Best Supporting Actress
