= Inga Ibsdotter Lilleaas =

Norwegian actress

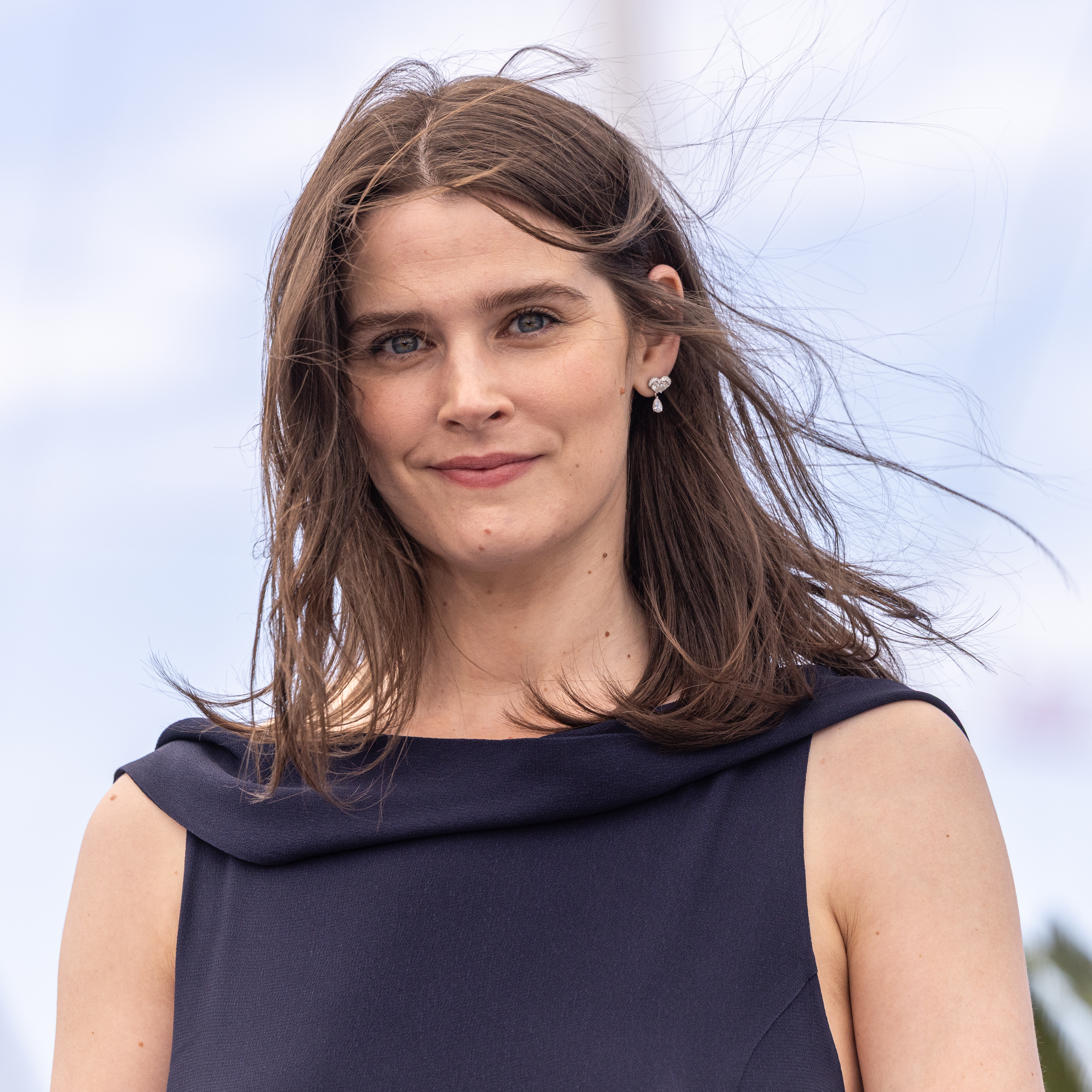
- Lilleaas at the 2025 Cannes Film Festival
- Born: 9 April 1989 (age 37); Gol, Buskerud, Norway
- Education: Nord University
- Occupation: Actress
- Years active: 2015–present
- Spouse: Gunnar Eiriksson
- Children: 1

Inga Ibsdotter Lilleaas (born 9 April 1989) is a Norwegian actress. She gained widespread critical acclaim in 2025 for her role as Agnes Borg Pettersen in Joachim Trier's Sentimental Value. Her performance earned her the National Board of Review Award for Best Supporting Actress, in addition to Academy Award, BAFTA Award, and Golden Globe Award nominations in the same category.

== Early life ==
Inga Ibsdotter Lilleaas was raised in Gol Municipality, Norway. Her parents ran a company that rented out costumes and equipment to amateur stage productions. As a high school student, she lived as a foreign exchange student in Brazil, where she learned to speak Portuguese. She studied theatre at Nord University, learning the Jacques Lecoq acting method focusing on physical theatre. She also spent a semester studying at the Lee Strasberg Theatre and Film Institute in New York City.

== Career ==
Lilleaas was nominated for the Amanda Award for Best Actress in 2015 for her film debut in Women in Oversized Men's Shirts (Kvinner i for store herreskjorter). In 2019, she performed the role of Hermia in A Midsummer Night's Dream at the Haugesund Theater in Haugesund, Norway. In 2021, she performed the role of Madame de Tourvel in Les Liaisons dangereuses. In 2023, she performed the role of Tamora in Titus Andronicus at the Nordland Theatre in Mo i Rana. Also in 2023, she starred in the Netflix musical film A Beautiful Life. In 2025, she starred as Agnes Borg in Joachim Trier's Sentimental Value, which premiered at the Cannes Film Festival, for which she won the National Board of Review Award for Best Supporting Actress.

== Personal life ==
Lilleaas is married to actor Gunnar Eiriksson, with whom she has one son.

== Filmography ==
| Year | Title | Role | Notes | Refs. |
|---|---|---|---|---|
| 2015 | Women in Oversized Men's Shirts | Sigrid Auge | Film debut | |
| 2016 | The Last King | Ylva | | |
| 2017 | Going West | Lotte | | |
| 2020 | Betrayed | Amalie Laksov | | |
| 2023 | A Beautiful Life | Lilly | Danish film | |
| 2025 | Sentimental Value | Agnes Borg Pettersen | | |
| 2026 | Small Talk | Elisabeth | | |
| TBA | Zero K | Artis | | |
| TBA | The Outsider | Claudia Andujar | | |

== Awards and nominations ==
| Year | Award | Category | Work | Result | Ref. |
|---|---|---|---|---|---|
| 2015 | Amanda Award | Best Actress | Women in Oversized Men's Shirts | Nominated | |
| 2016 | Kosmorama | Best Female Actress in a Leading Role | Women in Oversized Men's Shirts | Nominated | |
| 2025 | Savannah Film Festival | Discovery Award | Sentimental Value | Honored | |
| 2025 | Gotham Independent Film Awards | Outstanding Supporting Performance | Sentimental Value | Nominated | |
| 2025 | National Board of Review Awards | Best Supporting Actress | Sentimental Value | Won | |
| 2025 | Los Angeles Film Critics Association | Best Supporting Performance | Sentimental Value | Runner-up (Note: Shared with Andrew Scott for Blue Moon.) | |
| 2025 | Washington D.C. Area Film Critics Association | Best Supporting Actress | Sentimental Value | Nominated | |
| 2025 | Washington D.C. Area Film Critics Association | Best Ensemble | Sentimental Value | Nominated | |
| 2025 | Michigan Movie Critics Guild | Best Supporting Actress | Sentimental Value | Nominated | |
| 2025 | Chicago Film Critics Association | Best Supporting Actress | Sentimental Value | Nominated | |
| 2025 | Phoenix Critics Circle | Best Actress in a Supporting Role | Sentimental Value | Nominated | |
| 2025 | San Francisco Bay Area Film Critics Circle | Best Supporting Actress | Sentimental Value | Runner-up | |
| 2025 | St. Louis Film Critics Association | Best Supporting Actress | Sentimental Value | Nominated | |
| 2025 | New York Film Critics Online | Best Supporting Actress | Sentimental Value | Won | |
| 2025 | Seattle Film Critics Society | Best Actress in a Supporting Role | Sentimental Value | Nominated | |
| 2025 | Dallas–Fort Worth Film Critics Association | Best Supporting Actress | Sentimental Value | 3rd place | |
| 2025 | Austin Film Critics Association | Best Supporting Actress | Sentimental Value | Nominated | |
| 2025 | Online Association of Female Film Critics | Best Supporting Female | Sentimental Value | Runner-up (Note: Tied with Amy Madigan for Weapons.) | |
| 2025 | Kansas City Film Critics Circle | Best Supporting Actress | Sentimental Value | Nominated | |
| 2025 | Georgia Film Critics Association | Best Supporting Actress | Sentimental Value | Nominated | |
| 2025 | North Texas Film Critics Association | Best Supporting Actress | Sentimental Value | Nominated | |
| 2025 | New Jersey Film Critics Circle | Best Supporting Actress | Sentimental Value | Runner-up | |
| 2025 | New Jersey Film Critics Circle | Best Breakthrough Performance | Sentimental Value | Nominated | |
| 2025 | Alliance of Women Film Journalists | Best Supporting Actress | Sentimental Value | Nominated | |
| 2026 | Minnesota Film Critics Association | Best Supporting Actress | Sentimental Value | Nominated | |
| 2026 | Puerto Rico Critics Association | Best Supporting Actress | Sentimental Value | Nominated | |
| 2026 | National Society of Film Critics | Best Supporting Actress | Sentimental Value | Runner-up | |
| 2026 | Palm Springs International Film Festival | International Star Award | Sentimental Value | Honored (Note: Shared with Renate Reinsve, Stellan Skarsgård and Elle Fanning.) | |
| 2026 | Critics' Choice Awards | Best Supporting Actress | Sentimental Value | Nominated | |
| 2026 | Columbus Film Critics Association | Best Supporting Performance | Sentimental Value | Nominated | |
| 2026 | Astra Film Awards | Best Supporting Actress – Drama | Sentimental Value | Nominated | |
| 2026 | Astra Film Awards | Best Cast Ensemble | Sentimental Value | Nominated | |
| 2026 | Greater Western New York Film Critics Association | Best Breakthrough Performance | Sentimental Value | Nominated | |
| 2026 | Golden Globe Awards | Best Supporting Actress – Motion Picture | Sentimental Value | Nominated | |
| 2026 | Hawaii Film Critics Society | Best Supporting Actress | Sentimental Value | Nominated | |
| 2026 | Music City Film Critics Association | Best Supporting Actress | Sentimental Value | Nominated | |
| 2026 | North Dakota Film Society | Best Supporting Actress | Sentimental Value | Nominated | |
| 2026 | Houston Film Critics Society | Best Supporting Actress | Sentimental Value | Nominated | |
| 2026 | Denver Film Critics Society | Best Supporting Actress | Sentimental Value | Nominated | |
| 2026 | DiscussingFilm's Global Film Critics Awards | Best Supporting Actress | Sentimental Value | 3rd place | |
| 2026 | DiscussingFilm's Global Film Critics Awards | Best Breakthrough Performance | Sentimental Value | Nominated | |
| 2026 | North Carolina Film Critics Association | Best Supporting Actress | Sentimental Value | Nominated | |
| 2026 | Online Film Critics Society | Best Supporting Actress | Sentimental Value | Nominated | |
| 2026 | London Film Critics' Circle | Supporting Actress of the Year | Sentimental Value | Nominated | |
| 2026 | Midnight Critics Circle | Best Supporting Actress | Sentimental Value | Won | |
| 2026 | Midnight Critics Circle | Best Breakthrough Performance | Sentimental Value | Won | |
| 2026 | International Cinephile Society | Best Supporting Actress | Sentimental Value | Nominated | |
| 2026 | Latino Entertainment Journalists Association | Best Supporting Actress | Sentimental Value | Nominated | |
| 2026 | Santa Barbara International Film Festival | Virtuosos Award | Sentimental Value | Honored | |
| 2026 | Online Film & Television Association | Best Supporting Actress | Sentimental Value | Nominated | |
| 2026 | Online Film & Television Association | Best Breakthrough Performance: Female | Sentimental Value | Runner-up | |
| 2026 | British Academy Film Awards | Best Actress in a Supporting Role | Sentimental Value | Nominated | |
| 2026 | Dorian Awards | Supporting Film Performance of the Year | Sentimental Value | Nominated | |
| 2026 | Satellite Awards | Best Actress in a Supporting Role | Sentimental Value | Nominated | |
| 2026 | Academy Awards | Best Supporting Actress | Sentimental Value | Nominated | |

== See also ==
- List of Nordic Academy Award winners and nominees
- List of actors nominated for Academy Awards for non-English performances
- List of actors with Academy Award nominations
