= National Board of Review Award for Best Supporting Actress =

American film award

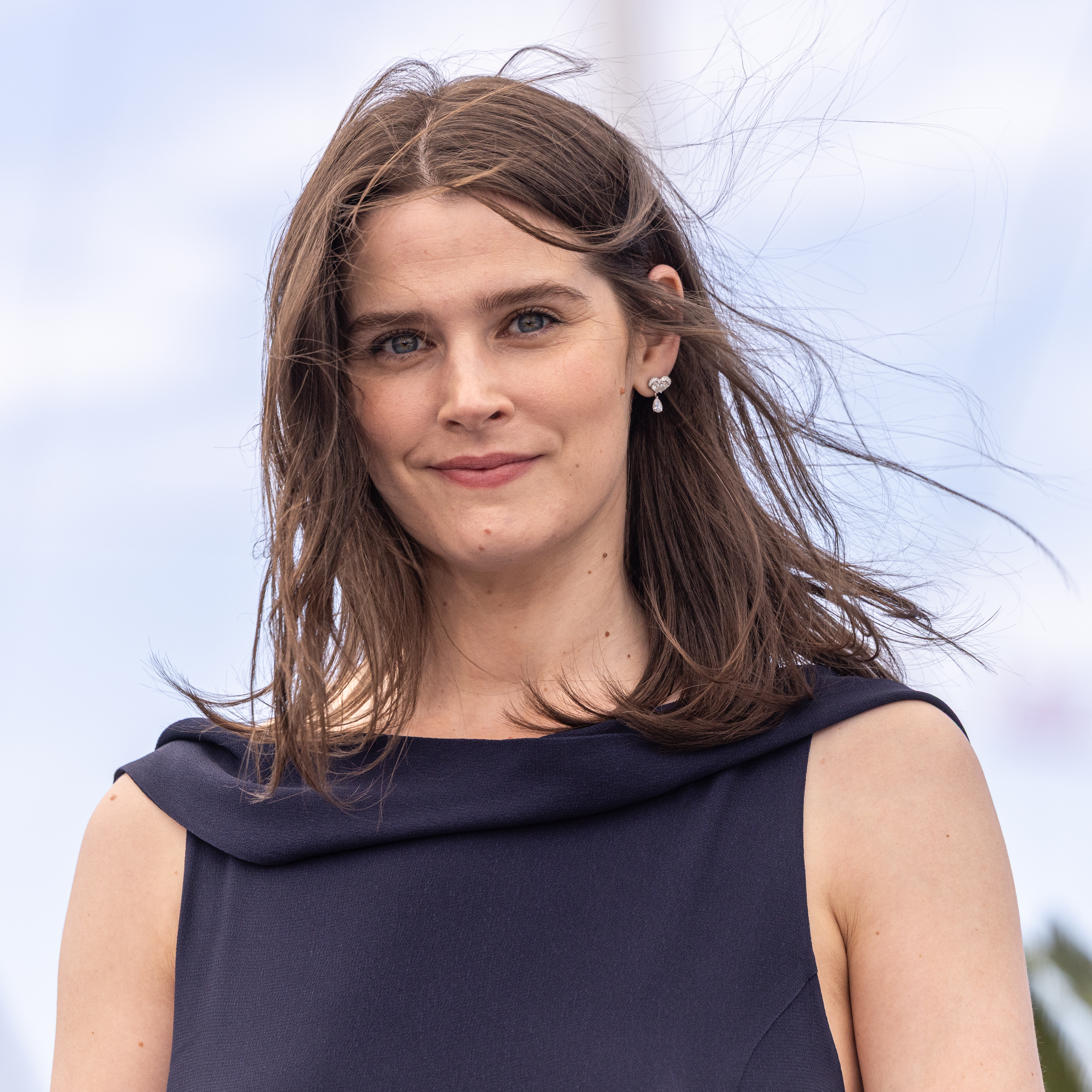
- Current recipient: Inga Ibsdotter Lilleaas
- Awarded for: Best Performance by an Actress in a Supporting Role
- Country: United States
- Presented by: National Board of Review
- First award: Nina Foch; Executive Suite (1954)
- Currently held by: Inga Ibsdotter Lilleaas; Sentimental Value (2025)
- Website: nationalboardofreview.org

The National Board of Review Award for Best Supporting Actress is one of the annual film awards given (since 1954) by the National Board of Review of Motion Pictures.

== Winners ==
=== 1950s ===
Year	Winner	Film	Role
1954	Nina Foch	Executive Suite	Erica Martin
1955	Marjorie Rambeau	A Man Called Peter	Miss Laura Fowler
1955	Marjorie Rambeau	The View from Pompey's Head	Lucy Devereaux Wales
1956	Debbie Reynolds	The Catered Affair	Jane Hurley
1957	Sybil Thorndike	The Prince and the Showgirl	The Queen Dowager
1958	Kay Walsh	The Horse's Mouth	Dee Coker
1959	Edith Evans	The Nun's Story	Rev. Mother Emmanuel

=== 1960s ===
Year	Winner	Film	Role
1960	Shirley Jones	Elmer Gantry	Lulu Bains
1961	Ruby Dee	A Raisin in the Sun	Ruth Younger
1962	Angela Lansbury	All Fall Down	Annabel Willart
1962	Angela Lansbury	The Manchurian Candidate	Eleanor Iselin
1963	Margaret Rutherford	The V.I.P.s	Duchess of Brighton
1964	Edith Evans	The Chalk Garden	Mrs. St. Maugham
1965	Joan Blondell	The Cincinnati Kid	Lady Fingers
1966	Vivien Merchant	Alfie	Lily
1967	Marjorie Rhodes	The Family Way	Lucy Fitton
1968	Virginia Maskell	Interlude	Antonia
1969	Pamela Franklin	The Prime of Miss Jean Brodie	Sandy

=== 1970s ===
Year	Winner	Film	Role
1970	Karen Black	Five Easy Pieces	Rayette Dipesto
1971	Cloris Leachman	The Last Picture Show	Ruth Popper
1972	Marisa Berenson	Cabaret	Natalia Landauer
1973	Sylvia Sidney	Summer Wishes, Winter Dreams	Mrs. Pritchett
1974	Valerie Perrine	Lenny	Honey Bruce
1975	Ronee Blakley	Nashville	Barbara Jean
1976	Talia Shire	Rocky	Adrian Pennino
1977	Diane Keaton	Annie Hall	Annie Hall
1978	Angela Lansbury	Death on the Nile	Salome Otterbourne
1979	Meryl Streep	Kramer vs. Kramer	Joanna Kramer
1979	Meryl Streep	Manhattan	Jill
1979	Meryl Streep	The Seduction of Joe Tynan	Karen Traynor

=== 1980s ===
Year	Winner	Film	Role
1980	Eva Le Gallienne	Resurrection	Grandma Pearl
1981	Mona Washbourne	Stevie	Aunt
1982	Glenn Close	The World According to Garp	Jenny Fields
1983	Linda Hunt	The Year of Living Dangerously	Billy Kwan
1984	Sabine Azéma	A Sunday in the Country	Irène
1985	Anjelica Huston	Prizzi's Honor	Maerose Prizzi
1986	Dianne Wiest	Hannah and Her Sisters	Holly
1987	Olympia Dukakis	Moonstruck	Rose Castorini
1988	Frances McDormand	Mississippi Burning	Mrs. Pell
1989	Mary Stuart Masterson	Immediate Family	Lucy

=== 1990s ===
Year	Winner	Film	Role
1990	Winona Ryder	Mermaids	Charlotte Flax
1991	Kate Nelligan	Frankie and Johnny	Cora
1992	Judy Davis	Husbands and Wives	Sally
1993	Winona Ryder	The Age of Innocence	May Welland
1994	Rosemary Harris	Tom & Viv	Rose Haigh-Wood
1995	Mira Sorvino	Mighty Aphrodite	Linda Ash
1996	Juliette Binoche and Kristin Scott Thomas	The English Patient	Hana and Katharine Clifton
1997	Anne Heche	Donnie Brasco	Maggie Pistone
1997	Anne Heche	Wag the Dog	Winifred Ames
1998	Christina Ricci	The Opposite of Sex	Dede Truitt
1999	Julianne Moore	An Ideal Husband	Mrs. Laura Cheveley
1999	Julianne Moore	Magnolia	Linda Partridge
1999	Julianne Moore	A Map of the World	Theresa Collins

=== 2000s ===
Year	Winner	Film	Role
2000	Lupe Ontiveros	Chuck & Buck	Beverly Franco
2001	Cate Blanchett	The Lord of the Rings: The Fellowship of the Ring	Galadriel
2001	Cate Blanchett	The Man Who Cried	Lola
2001	Cate Blanchett	The Shipping News	Petal Quoyle
2002	Kathy Bates	About Schmidt	Roberta Hertzel
2003	Patricia Clarkson	Pieces of April	Joy Burns
2003	Patricia Clarkson	The Station Agent	Olivia Harris
2004	Laura Linney	Kinsey	Clara McMillen
2005	Gong Li	Memoirs of a Geisha	Hatsumomo
2006	Catherine O'Hara	For Your Consideration	Marilyn Hack
2007	Amy Ryan	Gone Baby Gone	Helene McCready
2008	Penélope Cruz	Vicky Cristina Barcelona	María Elena
2009	Anna Kendrick	Up in the Air	Natalie Keener

=== 2010s ===
Year	Winner	Film	Role
2010	Jacki Weaver	Animal Kingdom	Janine “Smurf” Cody
2011	Shailene Woodley	The Descendants	Alexandra “Alex” King
2012	Ann Dowd	Compliance	Sandra
2013	Octavia Spencer	Fruitvale Station	Wanda Johnson
2014	Jessica Chastain	A Most Violent Year	Anna Morales
2015	Jennifer Jason Leigh	The Hateful Eight	Daisy Domergue
2016	Naomie Harris	Moonlight	Paula Harris
2017	Laurie Metcalf	Lady Bird	Marion McPherson
2018	Regina King	If Beale Street Could Talk	Sharon Rivers
2019	Kathy Bates	Richard Jewell	Barbara "Bobi" Jewell

=== 2020s ===
Year	Winner	Film	Role
2020	Youn Yuh-jung	Minari	Soon-ja
2021	Aunjanue Ellis-Taylor	King Richard	Oracene “Brandy” Price
2022	Janelle Monáe	Glass Onion: A Knives Out Mystery	Cassandra "Andi" Brand / Helen Brand
2023	Da'Vine Joy Randolph	The Holdovers	Mary Lamb
2024	Elle Fanning	A Complete Unknown	Sylvie Russo
2025	Inga Ibsdotter Lilleaas	Sentimental Value	Agnes Borg Pettersen

== Multiple awards ==
2 wins

- Kathy Bates (2002, 2019)
- Edith Evans (1959, 1964)
- Angela Lansbury (1962, 1978)
- Winona Ryder (1990, 1993)

== See also ==
- New York Film Critics Circle Award for Best Supporting Actress
- National Society of Film Critics Award for Best Supporting Actress
- Los Angeles Film Critics Association Award for Best Supporting Actress
