= National Board of Review Awards 2025 =

American film awards

97th NBR Awards
- Date: December 3, 2025; January 13, 2026 (ceremony)
- Location: Cipriani 42nd Street, New York City
- Hosted by: Willie Geist

Highlights
- Best Film: One Battle After Another

The 97th National Board of Review Awards, honoring the best in film for 2025, were announced on December 3, 2025. Paul Thomas Anderson's action thriller One Battle After Another won Best Film, being his second film to win the category following Licorice Pizza in 2021. It was also the most awarded film with five victories, including Best Director as well as three acting prizes—Leonardo DiCaprio for Best Actor, Benicio del Toro for Best Supporting Actor, and Chase Infiniti for Breakthrough Performance.

The annual awards gala was held on January 13, 2026, at Cipriani 42nd Street in New York City, hosted by television personality and journalist Willie Geist.

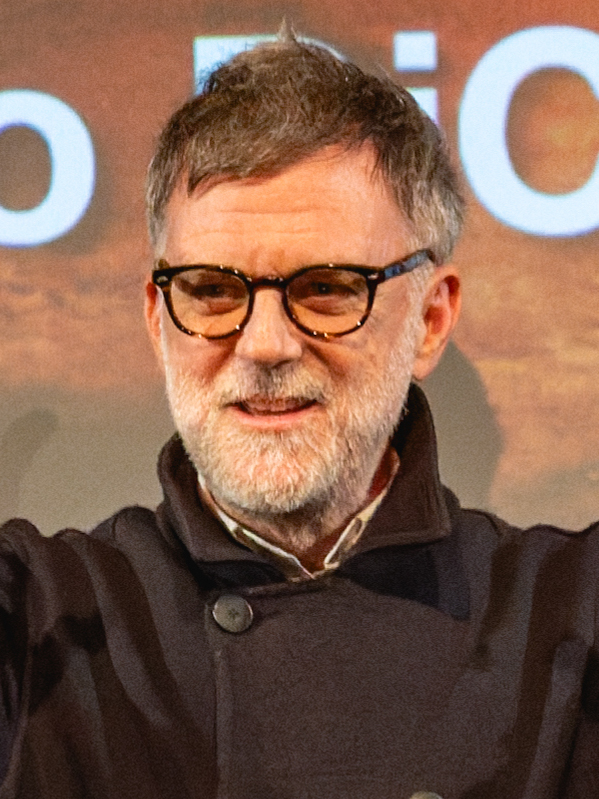
Paul Thomas Anderson, Best Director winner

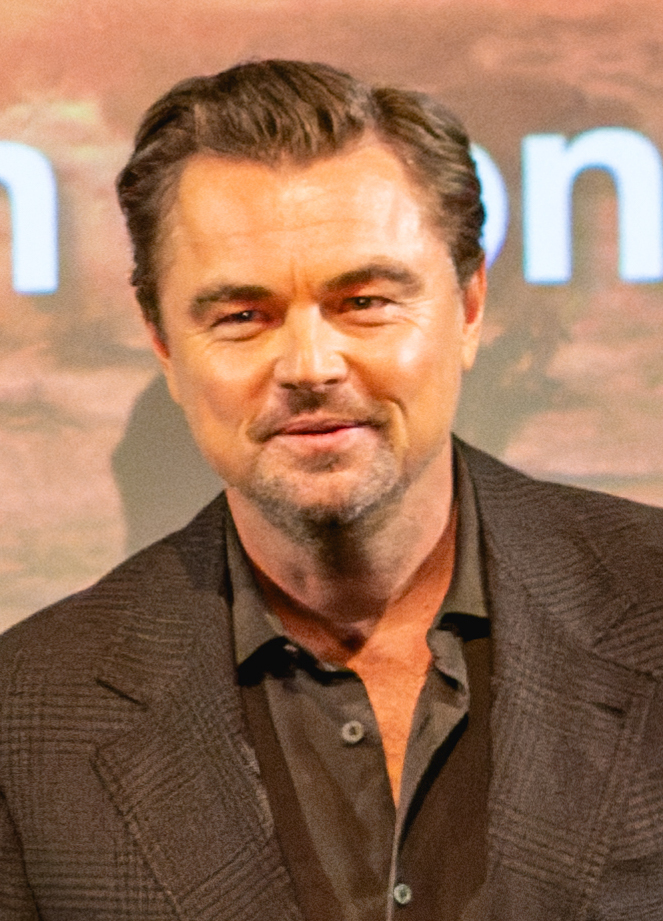
Leonardo Dicaprio, Best Actor winner

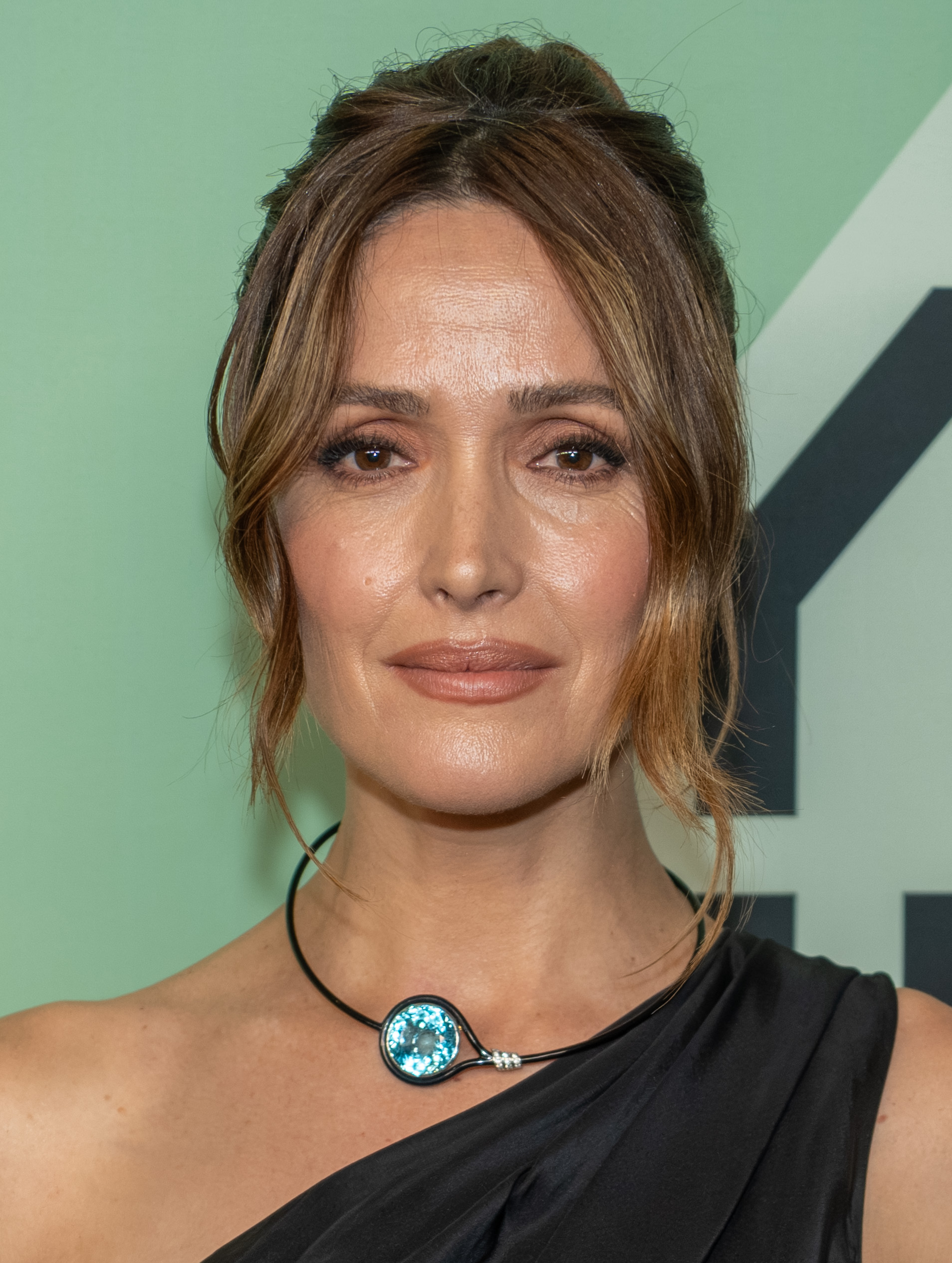
Rose Byrne, Best Actress winner

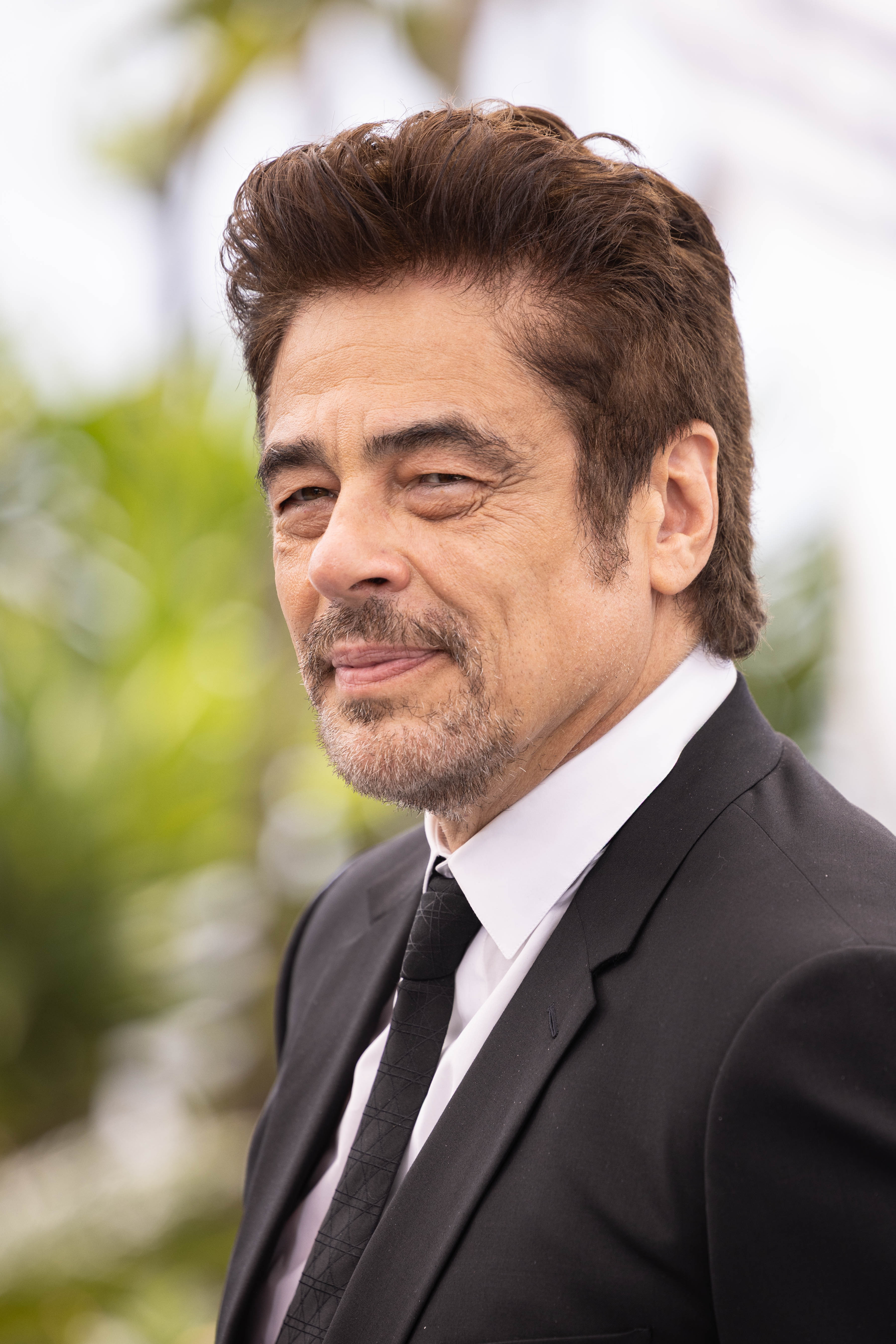
Benicio del Toro, Best Supporting Actor winner

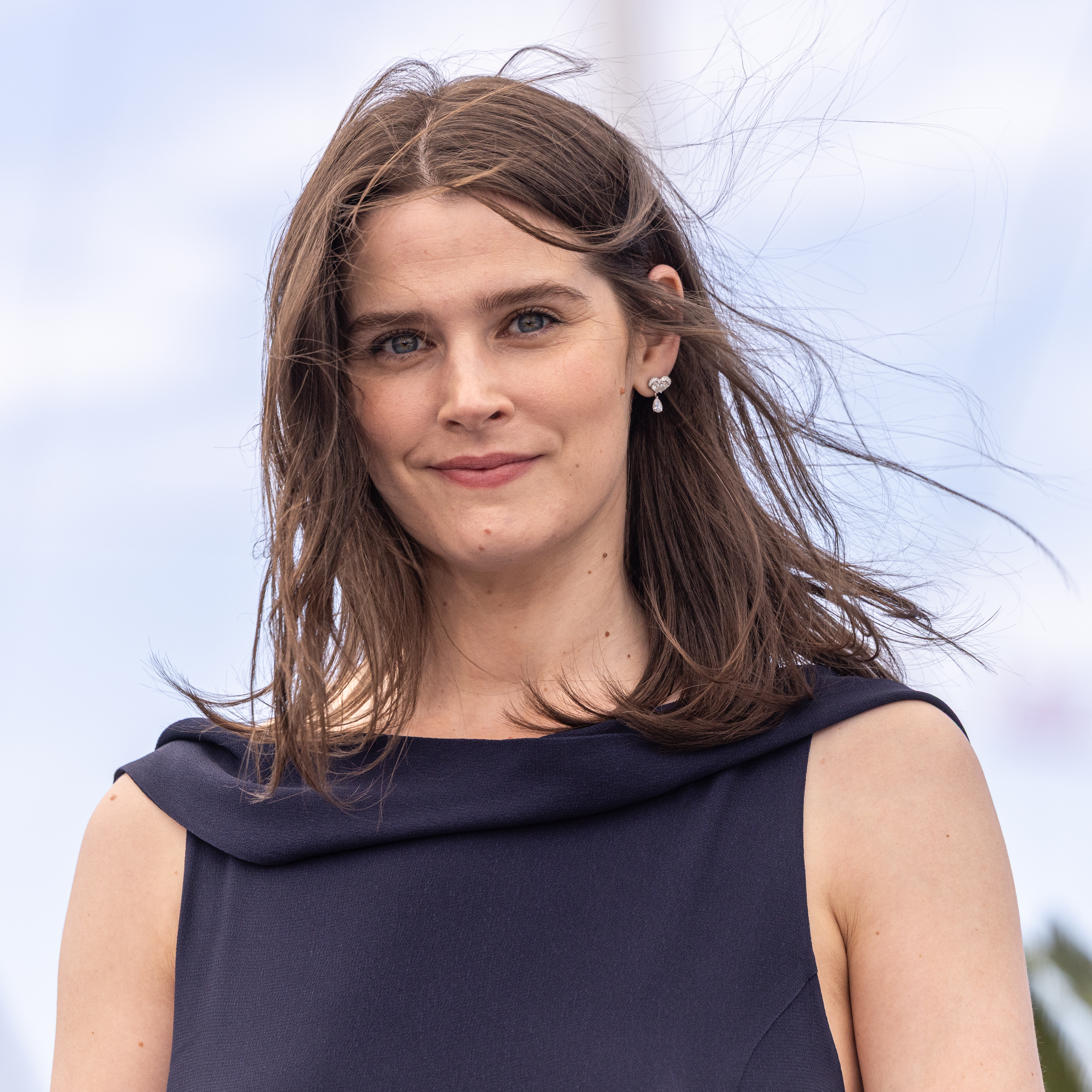
Inga Ibsdotter Lilleaas, Best Supporting Actress winner

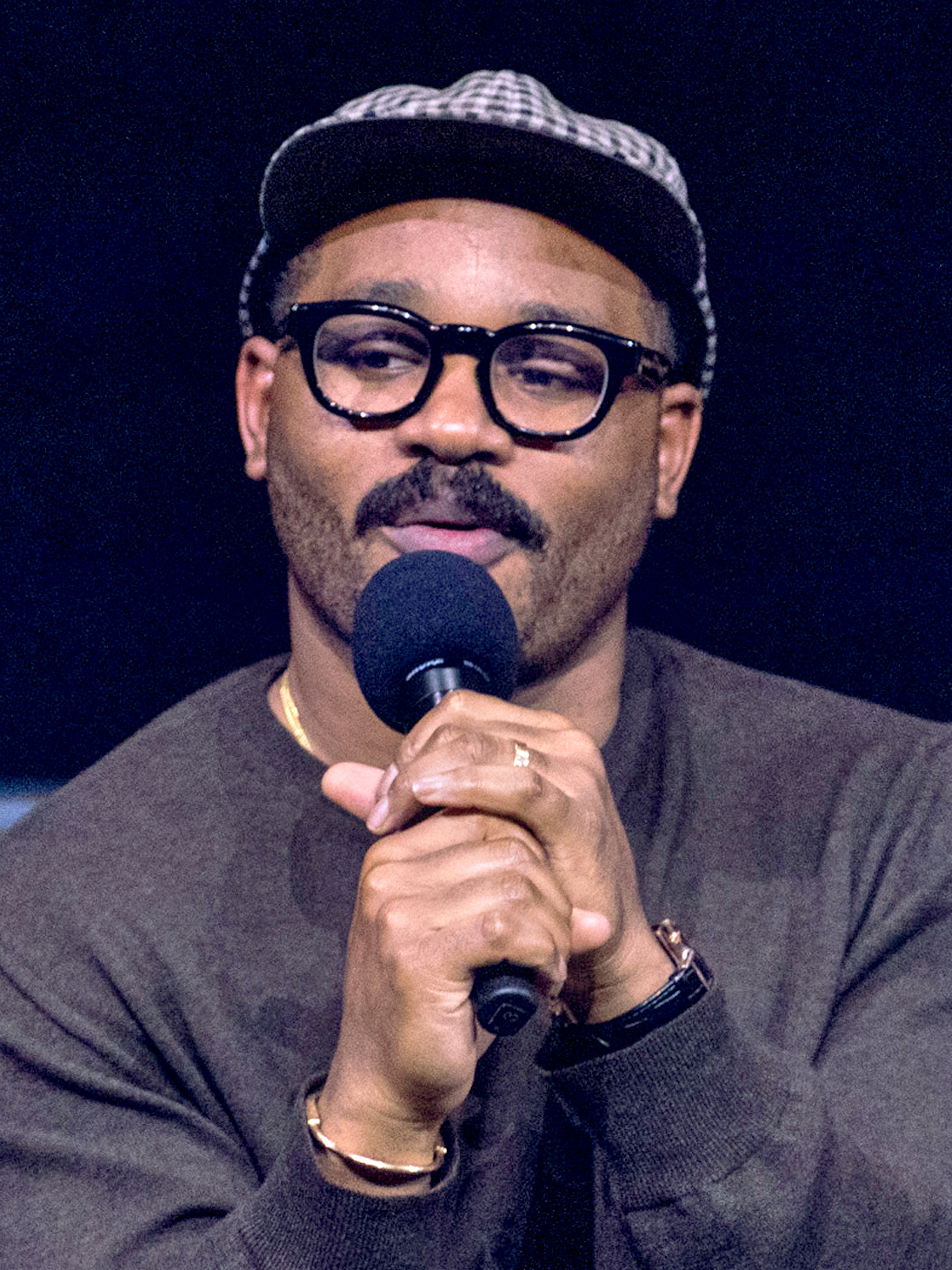
Ryan Coogler, Best Original Screenplay winner

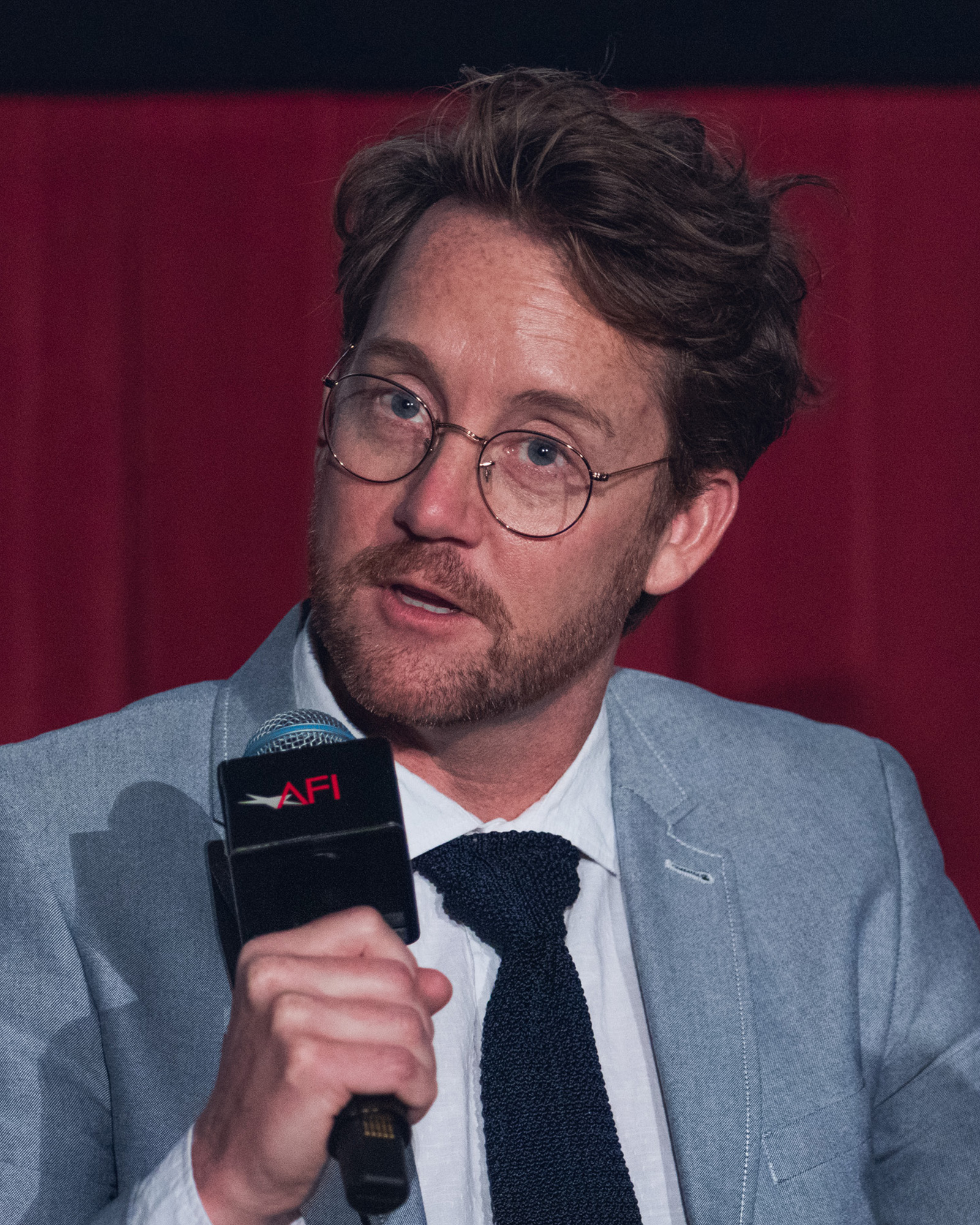
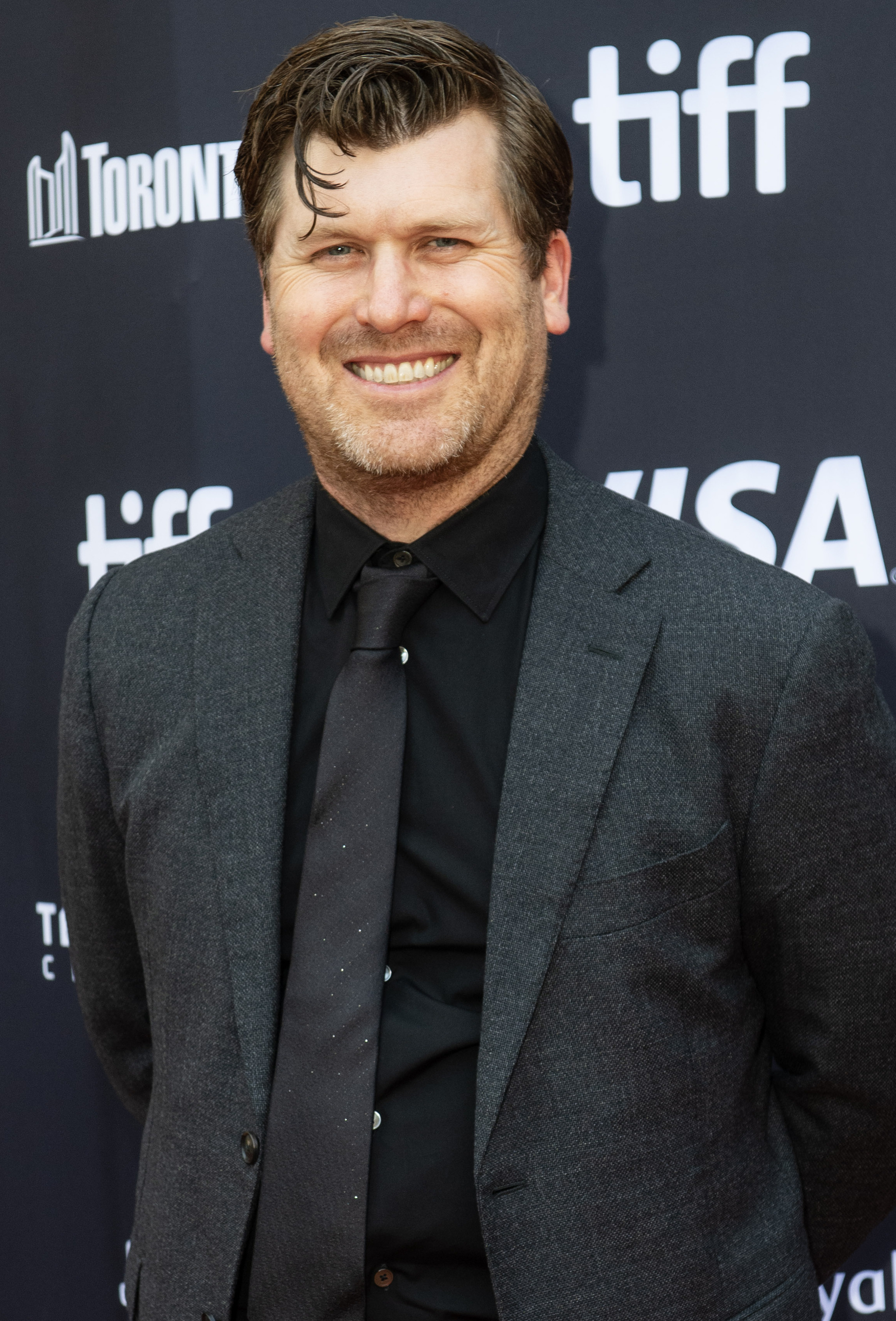
Clint Bentley and Greg Kwedar, Best Adapted Screenplay winners

== Top 10 Films ==
Films listed alphabetically except top, which is ranked as Best Film of the Year:

One Battle After Another

- Avatar: Fire and Ash
- F1
- Frankenstein
- Jay Kelly
- Marty Supreme
- Rental Family
- Sinners
- Train Dreams
- Wake Up Dead Man: A Knives Out Mystery
- Wicked: For Good

== Winners ==
Best Film:

- One Battle After Another

Best Director:

- Paul Thomas Anderson – One Battle After Another

Best Actor:

- Leonardo DiCaprio – One Battle After Another

Best Actress:

- Rose Byrne – If I Had Legs I'd Kick You

Best Supporting Actor:

- Benicio del Toro – One Battle After Another

Best Supporting Actress:

- Inga Ibsdotter Lilleaas – Sentimental Value

Best Original Screenplay:

- Ryan Coogler – Sinners

Best Adapted Screenplay:

- Clint Bentley and Greg Kwedar – Train Dreams

Best Animated Feature:

- Arco

Breakthrough Performance:

- Chase Infiniti – One Battle After Another

Best Directorial Debut:

- Eva Victor – Sorry, Baby

Best International Film:

- It Was Just an Accident

Best Documentary:

- Cover-Up

Outstanding Achievement in Cinematography:

- Autumn Durald Arkapaw – Sinners

Outstanding Achievement in Stunt Artistry:

- Mission: Impossible – The Final Reckoning

NBR Freedom of Expression Award:

- Put Your Soul on Your Hand and Walk

== Top 5 International Films ==
It Was Just an Accident (Iran)

- Left-Handed Girl (Taiwan)
- The Love That Remains (Iceland)
- The Secret Agent (Brazil)
- Sentimental Value (Norway)
- Sirāt (Spain)

== Top 5 Documentaries ==
Cover-Up

- 2000 Meters to Andriivka
- Come See Me in the Good Light
- My Mom Jayne
- Natchez
- Orwell: 2+2=5

== Top 10 Independent Films ==
- The Baltimorons
- Bring Her Back
- Father Mother Sister Brother
- Friendship
- Good Boy
- If I Had Legs I'd Kick You
- The Mastermind
- Rebuilding
- Sorry, Baby
- Urchin
