= Astra Film Award for Best Supporting Actress =

Annual award given by Hollywood Creative Alliance

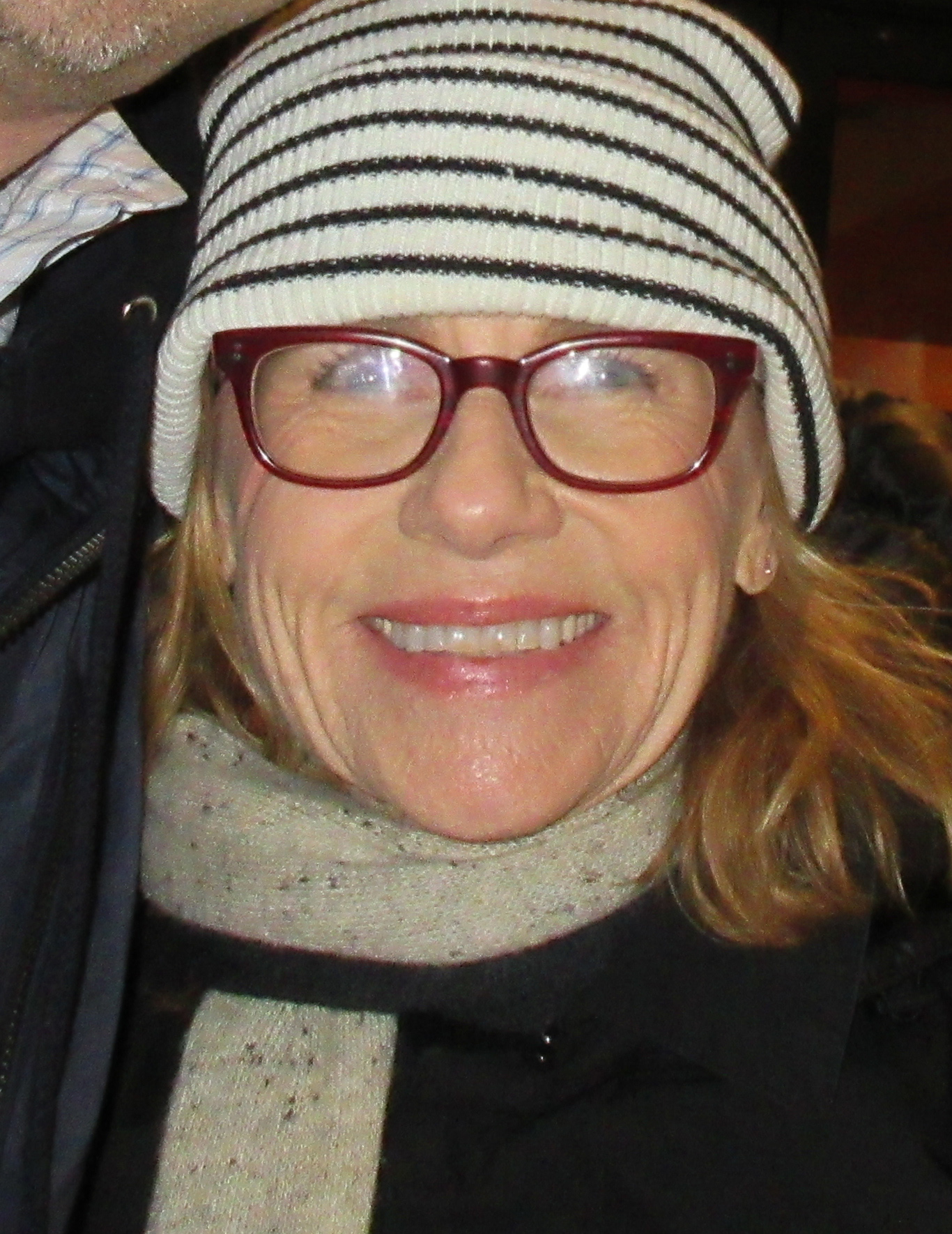
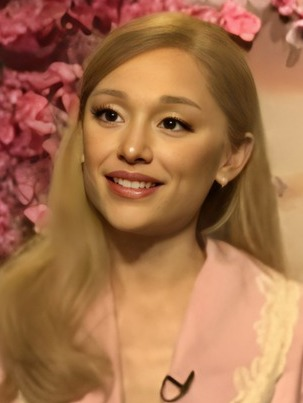
- The 2025 recipients: Amy Madigan and Ariana Grande
- Awarded for: Best Supporting Actress in a Drama Motion Picture; Best Supporting Actress in a Comedy or Musical Motion Picture
- Country: United States
- Presented by: Hollywood Creative Alliance
- First award: Allison Janney; I, Tonya (2017)
- Currently held by: Drama: Amy Madigan – Weapons (2025); Comedy or Musical: Ariana Grande – Wicked: For Good (2025)
- Website: hollywoodcreative.org

The Astra Film Award for Best Supporting Actress - Drama and the Astra Film Award for Best Supporting Actress - Comedy or Musical are two of the annual awards given out by the Hollywood Creative Alliance. Prior to 2025, the category was combined into a single category, the Astra Film Award for Best Supporting Actress.

== Winners ==
- † = Winner of the Academy Award for Best Supporting Actress
- ‡ = Nominated of the Academy Award for Best Supporting Actress

=== 2010s ===
Year	Winner and nominees	Film	Role
2017	Allison Janney †	I, Tonya	LaVona Fay Golden
2017	Tiffany Haddish	Girls Trip	Dina
2017	Holly Hunter	The Big Sick	Beth Gardner
2017	Laurie Metcalf ‡	Lady Bird	Marion McPherson
2017	Octavia Spencer ‡	The Shape of Water	Zelda Delilah Fuller
2018	Regina King †	If Beale Street Could Talk	Sharon Rivers
2018	Amy Adams ‡	Vice	Lynne Cheney
2018	Elizabeth Debicki	Widows	Alice
2018	Emma Stone ‡	The Favourite	Abigail Hill
2018	Rachel Weisz ‡	The Favourite	Sarah Churchill
2019	Jennifer Lopez	Hustlers	Ramona Vega
2019	Laura Dern †	Marriage Story	Nora Fanshaw
2019	Margot Robbie	Once Upon a Time in Hollywood	Sharon Tate
2019	Taylor Russell	Waves	Emily Williams
2019	Zhao Shu-zhen	The Farewell	Nai Nai

=== 2020s ===
Year	Category	Winner and nominees	Film	Role
2020		Youn Yuh-jung †	Minari	Soon-ja
2020		Ellen Burstyn	Pieces of a Woman	Elizabeth Weiss
2020		Glenn Close ‡	Hillbilly Elegy	Bonnie "Mawmaw" Vance
2020		Olivia Colman ‡	The Father	Anne
2020		Amanda Seyfried ‡	Mank	Marion Davies
2021		Ariana DeBose †	West Side Story	Anita
2021		Caitríona Balfe	Belfast	Ma
2021		Aunjanue Ellis-Taylor ‡	King Richard	Oracene "Brandy" Price
2021		Marlee Matlin	CODA	Jackie Rossi
2021		Ruth Negga	Passing	Claire Bellew
2022		Angela Bassett ‡	Black Panther: Wakanda Forever	Queen Ramonda
2022		Hong Chau ‡	The Whale	Liz
2022		Kerry Condon ‡	The Banshees of Inisherin	Siobhán Súilleabháin
2022		Jamie Lee Curtis †	Everything Everywhere All at Once	Deirdre Beaubeirdre
2022		Stephanie Hsu ‡	Everything Everywhere All at Once	Joy Wang / Jobu Tupaki
2022		Keke Palmer	Nope	Emerald "Em" Haywood
2023		Da'Vine Joy Randolph †	The Holdovers	Mary Lamb
2023		Danielle Brooks ‡	The Color Purple	Sofia
2023		Viola Davis	Air	Deloris Jordan
2023		America Ferrera ‡	Barbie	Gloria
2023		Rachel McAdams	Are You There God? It's Me, Margaret.	Barbara Simon
2023		Julianne Moore	May December	Gracie Atherton-Yoo
2024		Ariana Grande ‡ (TIE)	Wicked	Galinda "Glinda" Upland
2024		Zoe Saldaña † (TIE)	Emilia Pérez	Rita Mora Castro
2024		Danielle Deadwyler	The Piano Lesson	Berniece Charles
2024		Aunjanue Ellis-Taylor	Nickel Boys	Hattie
2024		Selena Gomez	Emilia Pérez	Jessi Del Monte
2024		Margaret Qualley	The Substance	Sue
2025	Drama	Amy Madigan †	Weapons	Gladys
2025	Drama	Elle Fanning ‡	Sentimental Value	Rachel Kemp
2025	Drama	Nina Hoss	Hedda	Eileen Lovborg
2025	Drama	Inga Ibsdotter Lilleaas ‡	Sentimental Value	Agnes Borg Pettersen
2025	Drama	Wunmi Mosaku ‡	Sinners	Annie
2025	Drama	Hailee Steinfeld	Sinners	Mary
2025	Comedy or Musical	Ariana Grande	Wicked: For Good	Galinda "Glinda" Upland
2025	Comedy or Musical	Odessa A'zion	Marty Supreme	Rachel Mizler
2025	Comedy or Musical	Glenn Close	Wake Up Dead Man	Martha Delacroix
2025	Comedy or Musical	Regina Hall	One Battle After Another	Deandra
2025	Comedy or Musical	Gwyneth Paltrow	Marty Supreme	Kay Stone
2025	Comedy or Musical	Teyana Taylor ‡	One Battle After Another	Perfidia Beverly Hills
