= Jay Kelly =

2025 film by Noah Baumbach

- Release poster
- Directed by: Noah Baumbach
- Written by: Noah Baumbach; Emily Mortimer
- Produced by: Noah Baumbach; Amy Pascal; David Heyman
- Starring: George Clooney; Adam Sandler
- Cinematography: Linus Sandgren
- Edited by: Valerio Bonelli; Rachel Durance
- Music by: Nicholas Britell
- Production companies: Pascal Pictures; Heyday Films; NB/GG Pictures
- Distributed by: Netflix
- Release dates: August 28, 2025 (Venice); November 14, 2025 (United States)
- Running time: 132 minutes
- Countries: United Kingdom; United States
- Language: English

Jay Kelly is a 2025 comedy-drama film directed by Noah Baumbach from a script he wrote with Emily Mortimer. The film stars an ensemble cast that includes George Clooney, Adam Sandler, Laura Dern, and Billy Crudup. It follows a famous actor (Clooney) as he travels through Europe with his team and manager (Sandler), and reflects on his life choices, relationships, and legacy.

The film had its world premiere in the main competition of the 82nd Venice International Film Festival on August 28, 2025. It was then released in select theaters on November 14, 2025, followed by a global release on Netflix on December 5. The film received positive reviews from critics, with praise for Clooney and Sandler's performances. Both Clooney and Sandler received acting nominations at the 83rd Golden Globe Awards for their performances in the film.

== Plot ==
After completing his latest film, actor Jay Kelly attempts to spend time with his daughter Daisy before she leaves for Europe and begins college. She declines, preferring to travel with friends. He learns from his longtime manager, Ron Sukenick, that Peter Schneider—the director who launched Jay's career—has died. Months earlier, Schneider had asked Jay to attach his name to a new project to secure financing, which he refused.

After the funeral, Jay meets Tim Galligan, his former acting-school roommate, and they go for drinks. Reminiscing about their lives, the conversation turns hostile when Tim accuses Jay of stealing the part that made him famous. They have a fistfight in the parking lot, leaving Jay with a black eye.

The next morning, Jay abruptly exits his upcoming film and books a trip to Europe to follow Daisy. Ron warns that abandoning the project will damage his career, but Jay ties the trip to a ceremony in Tuscany for a career-tribute award that he had previously declined. Using Daisy's friend's AMEX card activity, Jay's assistant Meg locates Daisy's group.

When Jay and his team arrive in Paris, Daisy is boarding a train, so they follow. Onboard, Jay interacts with passengers who recognize him, while Ron and Jay's publicist Liz receive word that Tim is suing him for assault. Ron and Liz discuss their long history managing Jay's crises and the personal costs of remaining in his orbit; Liz later quits and disembarks the train.

While on the train, Jay flashes back to moments from his past, including his strained relationship with his older daughter Jessica. He had cheated on her mother with his co-star on one of his first films. Jay eventually finds Daisy in the dining car and invites her to his tribute, but she chooses to remain with her friends.

When a cyclist on the train steals a passenger's handbag, Jay chases after him and retrieves it, generating viral attention that casts him as a hero. Ron proposes inviting Jay's estranged father to join them in Tuscany, so Jay agrees in hopes of repairing their relationship. Upon arrival, the viral clip boosts Jay's visibility.

While Jay dines with his father and friends, Ron departs to meet another client, Ben Alcock. He was set to receive the tribute after Jay's initial refusal, only to now have to share it. Ben reluctantly tells Ron he is firing him, in part due to Ron's preoccupation with Jay.

At a party the night before the ceremony, Ron reports that Tim dropped the lawsuit after lawyers uncovered an old drug charge in Tim's past. He and Jay argue about how much Jay takes him for granted. Jay's father experiences dizziness at the party and chooses to return to Maine; Jay urges him to stay but fails to stop the departing taxi.

Jay runs into Ben and his family and gives them most of his guest tickets to the tribute, then wanders into the nearby woods. He calls Jessica asking her to visit, but she refuses; Jay apologizes for prioritizing his career over his children, while Jessica says she has made peace with not having him in her life.

The next morning, Jay returns to the villa and sees Ron departing by taxi. He runs after him, and Ron says he can no longer work for him. Jay asks Ron to attend the tribute as a friend and says he shares his professional success with him. Daisy later sends Jay a message on his phone congratulating him on the tribute. At the tribute, Jay and Ron tearfully watch a reel of Jay's performances, (Note: The in-film tribute reel contains clips from George Clooney's real-life performances from 17 of his films as well as the television series ER.) ending with footage of Jessica and Daisy as children. As the audience stands in applause, an emotional Jay looks to the camera and asks, "Can I go again? I'd like another one."

== Cast ==
- George Clooney as Jay Kelly, a famous actor
  - Charlie Rowe as Young Jay Kelly
- Adam Sandler as Ron Sukenick, Jay's manager
- Laura Dern as Liz, Jay's publicist
- Billy Crudup as Timothy Galligan, Jay's acting school buddy who never got his big break
  - Louis Partridge as Young Timothy
- Riley Keough as Jessica Kelly, Jay's elder daughter
- Grace Edwards as Daisy Kelly, Jay's younger daughter
- Stacy Keach as Mr. Kelly, Jay's father. This is Keach's final role before his death in 2026.
- Jim Broadbent as Peter Schneider, a recently deceased director who gave Jay his big break
- Patrick Wilson as Ben Alcock, another actor managed by Ron
- Eve Hewson as Daphne Spender, Jay's co-star in one of his earlier films, with whom he had an affair
- Greta Gerwig as Lois Sukenick, Ron's wife
- Alba Rohrwacher as Alba, a film festival assistant serving as Jay's guide in Tuscany
- Josh Hamilton as Carter, Jessica's therapist
- Lenny Henry as Larry, Jay's acting coach from his youth
- Emily Mortimer as Candy, Jay's hairstylist
- Nicôle Lecky as Krista, Liz's assistant
- Thaddea Graham as Meg, Jay's assistant
- Sadie Sandler as Vivienne Sukenick, Ron's daughter
- Isla Fisher as Melanie Alcock, Ben Alcock's wife
- Jamie Demetriou as Clive, a passenger on the train from France to Italy that Jay befriends
- Patsy Ferran as Brenda, Clive's girlfriend
- Parker Sawyers as Props
- Lars Eidinger as German Cyclist
- Giovanni Zeqireya as Silvano, Jay's bodyguard
- Kyle Soller as the director of the film Jay completes prior to his Europe trip
- Tom Francis as Actor at Audition
- Giovanni Esposito as Antonio, one of Jay's father's Italian friends

Additionally, Baumbach and cinematographer Linus Sandgren make cameos as the director and camera operator, respectively, on one of Jay's past films.

== Production ==
It was announced in December 2023 that Noah Baumbach had set up his next project in his deal with Netflix, with George Clooney and Adam Sandler cast to star. Baumbach co-wrote the screenplay with Emily Mortimer, while Amy Pascal and David Heyman served as producers through their respective Pascal Pictures and Heyday Films labels.

In March 2024, Laura Dern, Billy Crudup and Riley Keough were added to the cast. Later that month, Jim Broadbent, Patsy Ferran, Isla Fisher, Greta Gerwig, Louis Partridge, Alba Rohrwacher, and Patrick Wilson were among those announced as part of the cast, with Mortimer also due to appear in the film.

Principal photography began in March 2024, with production occurring between New York City, London, and Tuscany. Swedish cinematographer Linus Sandgren shot the project on 35mm film, marking his first collaboration with Baumbach. Valerio Bonelli serves as the editor.

=== Music ===
By July 2025, Nicholas Britell had been hired to compose the score.

== Release ==
Jay Kelly had its world premiere at the 82nd Venice International Film Festival in competition on August 28, 2025. It also screened at the 63rd New York Film Festival, and the 69th BFI London Film Festival. It was released in select theaters on November 14, 2025, before releasing on Netflix on December 5.

== Reception ==
=== Critical response ===
On the review aggregator website Rotten Tomatoes, 75% of 240 critics' reviews are positive, with an average rating of 7/10. The website's consensus reads: "George Clooney riffs on his star persona with disarming vulnerability while Adam Sandler impressively expands his dramatic range in Jay Kelly, a Hollywood satire that's gentler than one might expect from director Noah Baumbach." Metacritic, which uses a weighted average, assigned the film a score of 67 out of 100, based on 51 critics, indicating "generally favorable" reviews.

=== Accolades ===
Award	Date of ceremony	Category	Recipient(s)	Result	Ref.
AARP Movies for Grownups Awards	January 10, 2026	Best Actor	George Clooney	Won	
AARP Movies for Grownups Awards	January 10, 2026	Best Screenwriter	Noah Baumbach and Emily Mortimer	Nominated	
AARP Movies for Grownups Awards	January 10, 2026	Best Ensemble	Cast of Jay Kelly	Nominated	
American Film Institute Awards	December 4, 2025	Top 10 Films	Jay Kelly	Won (Note: Award shared with nine other films.)	
Astra Film Awards	January 9, 2026	Best Picture – Comedy or Musical	Jay Kelly	Nominated	
Astra Film Awards	January 9, 2026	Best Actor – Comedy or Musical	George Clooney	Nominated	
Astra Film Awards	January 9, 2026	Best Supporting Actor – Comedy or Musical	Adam Sandler	Won	
Astra Film Awards	January 9, 2026	Best Original Screenplay	Noah Baumbach and Emily Mortimer	Nominated	
Astra Film Awards	January 9, 2026	Best Cast Ensemble	Jay Kelly	Nominated	
Astra Creative Arts Awards	December 11, 2025	Best Casting	Douglas Aibel and Nina Gold	Nominated	
Astra Creative Arts Awards	December 11, 2025	Best Original Score	Nicholas Britell	Nominated	
Austin Film Critics Association	December 18, 2025	Best Supporting Actor	Adam Sandler	Nominated	
Critics' Choice Movie Awards	January 4, 2026	Best Picture	Jay Kelly	Nominated	
Critics' Choice Movie Awards	January 4, 2026	Best Supporting Actor	Adam Sandler	Nominated	
Critics' Choice Movie Awards	January 4, 2026	Best Original Screenplay	Noah Baumbach and Emily Mortimer	Nominated	
Critics' Choice Movie Awards	January 4, 2026	Best Casting and Ensemble	Douglas Aibel and Nina Gold	Nominated	
Golden Globe Awards	January 11, 2026	Best Actor in a Motion Picture – Musical or Comedy	George Clooney	Nominated	
Golden Globe Awards	January 11, 2026	Best Supporting Actor – Motion Picture	Adam Sandler	Nominated	
Gotham Film Awards	December 1, 2025	Outstanding Supporting Performance	Adam Sandler	Nominated	
Gotham Film Awards	December 1, 2025	Director Tribute	Noah Baumbach	Won	
IndieWire Honors	December 4, 2025	Vanguard Award	Adam Sandler	Won	
Middleburg Film Festival	October 16, 2025	Ensemble & Casting Award	Douglas Aibel, Nina Gold and the cast of Jay Kelly	Won	
National Board of Review	December 3, 2025	Top 10 Films	Jay Kelly	Won	
Palm Springs International Film Festival	January 3, 2026	Chairman's Award	Adam Sandler	Won	
Santa Barbara International Film Festival	February 8, 2026	Maltin Modern Master Award	Adam Sandler	Honored	
Set Decorators Society of America	February 21, 2026	Best Achievement in Décor/Design of a Contemporary Feature Film	Véronique Melery, Meg Everist, and Mark Tildesley	Nominated	
Venice International Film Festival	September 6, 2025	Golden Lion	Noah Baumbach	Nominated	
Virginia Film Festival	October 24, 2025	Achievement in Film Composition	Nicholas Britell	Won	
Zurich Film Festival	September 26, 2025	A Tribute To … Award	Noah Baumbach	Won	
