= Astra Film Award for Best Adapted Screenplay =

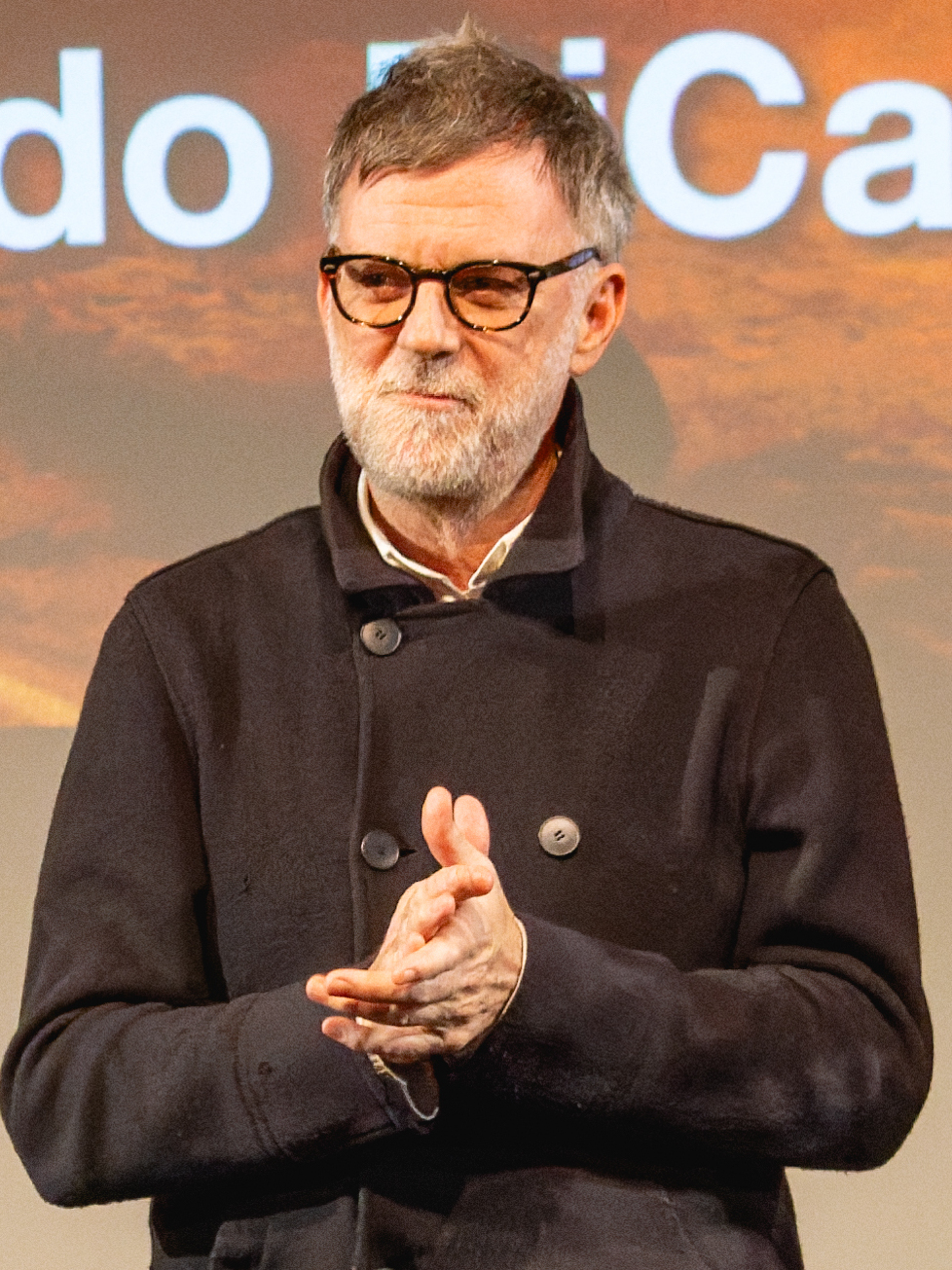
- The 2025 recipient: Paul Thomas Anderson
- Awarded for: Best writing based on pre-existing material
- Country: United States
- Presented by: Hollywood Creative Alliance
- First award: Aaron Sorkin (2017)
- Currently held by: Paul Thomas Anderson; One Battle After Another (2025)
- Website: hollywoodcreative.org

The Astra Film Award for Best Adapted Screenplay is one of the annual awards given out by the Hollywood Creative Alliance.

== Winners ==
=== 2010s ===
Year	Writer(s)	Film
2017	Aaron Sorkin	Molly's Game
2017	James Ivory	Call Me by Your Name
2017	Michael H. Weber and Scott Neustadter	The Disaster Arist
2017	Scott Frank, James Mangold, and Michael Green	Logan
2017	Virgil Williams and Dee Rees	Mudbound
2018	Audrey Wells	The Hate U Give
2018	Spike Lee, David Rabinowitz, Kevin Willmott, and Charlie Wachtel	BlacKkKlansman
2018	Nicole Holofcener and Jeff Whitty	Can You Ever Forgive Me?
2018	Barry Jenkins	If Beale Street Could Talk
2018	Bradley Cooper and Eric Roth	A Star is Born
2019	Taika Waititi	Jojo Rabbit
2019	Lorene Scafaria	Hustlers
2019	Steven Zaillian	The Irishman
2019	Scott Silver and Todd Phillips	Joker
2019	Anthony McCarten	The Two Popes

=== 2020s ===
Year	Writer(s)	Film
2020	Kemp Powers	One Night in Miami...
2020	Florian Zeller	The Father
2020	Jonathan Raymond and Kelly Reichardt	First Cow
2020	Ruben Santiago-Hudson	Ma Rainey's Black Bottom
2020	Chloé Zhao	Nomadland
2021	Siân Heder	CODA
2021	Maggie Gyllenhaal	The Lost Daughter
2021	Rebecca Hall	Passing
2021	Jane Campion	The Power of the Dog
2021	Steven Levenson	tick, tick... BOOM!
2022	Sarah Polley	Women Talking
2022	Rian Johnson	Glass Onion: A Knives Out Mystery
2022	Guillermo del Toro and Patrick McHale	Guillermo del Toro's Pinocchio
2022	Rebecca Lenkiewicz	She Said
2022	Samuel D. Hunter	The Whale
2023	Cord Jefferson	American Fiction
2023	Kelly Fremon Craig	Are You There God? It's Me, Margaret.
2023	Eric Roth and Martin Scorsese	Killers of the Flower Moon
2023	Christopher Nolan	Oppenheimer
2023	Tony McNamara	Poor Things
2023	Phil Lord, Christopher Miller, and Dave Callaham	Spider-Man: Across the Spider-Verse
2024	Denis Villeneuve and Jon Spaihts	Dune: Part Two
2024	Peter Straughan	Conclave
2024	Glen Powell and Richard Linklater	Hit Man
2024	RaMell Ross and Joslyn Barnes	Nickel Boys
2024	Clint Bentley and Greg Kwedar	Sing Sing
2024	Winnie Holzman and Dana Fox	Wicked
2025	Paul Thomas Anderson	One Battle After Another
2025	Will Tracy	Bugonia
2025	Guillermo del Toro	Frankenstein
2025	Chloé Zhao and Maggie O'Farrell	Hamnet
2025	Park Chan-wook, Don McKellar, Lee Kyoung-mi, and Lee Ja-hye	No Other Choice
2025	Clint Bentley and Greg Kwedar	Train Dreams
