= Astra Film Award for Best Actress =

Film award

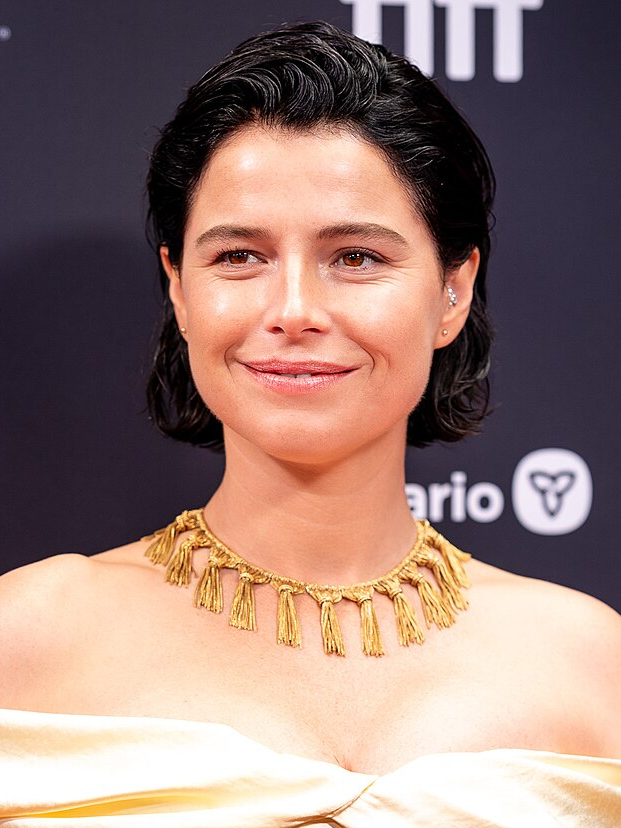
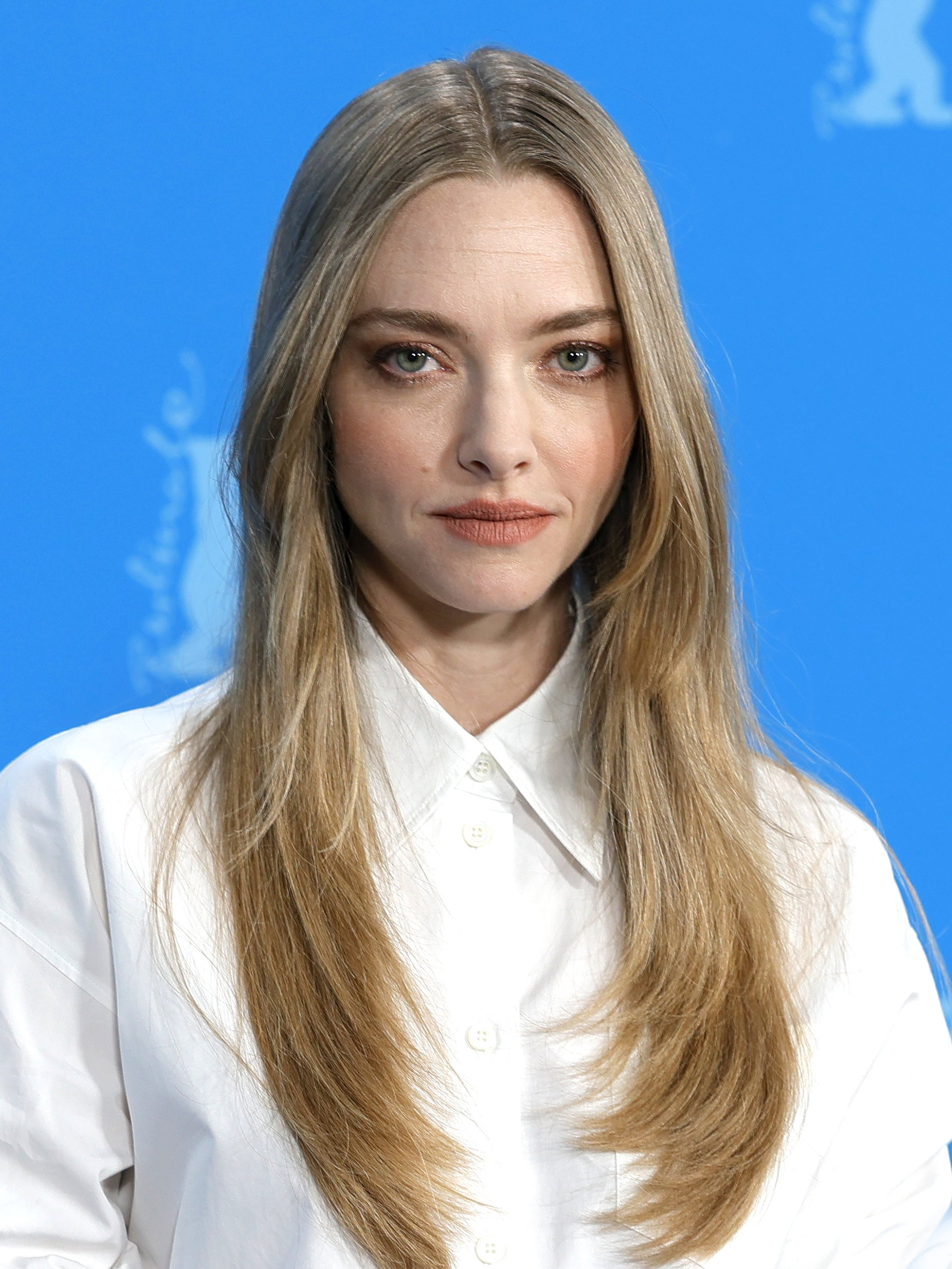
- The 2025 recipients: Jessie Buckley and Amanda Seyfried
- Awarded for: Best Actress in a Drama Motion Picture; Best Actress in a Comedy or Musical Motion Picture
- Country: United States
- Presented by: Hollywood Creative Alliance
- First award: Sally Hawkins; The Shape of Water (2017)
- Currently held by: Drama: Jessie Buckley - Hamnet (2025); Comedy or Musical: Amanda Seyfried - The Testament of Ann Lee (2025)
- Website: hollywoodcreative.org

The Astra Film Award for Best Actress - Drama and the Astra Film Award for Best Actress - Comedy or Musical are two of the annual awards given out by the Hollywood Creative Alliance. Prior to 2025, the category was combined into a single category, the Astra Film Award for Best Actress.

== Winners ==
- † = Winner of the Academy Award for Best Actress
- ‡ = Nominated for the Academy Award for Best Actress

=== 2010s ===
Year	Winner and nominees	Film	Role
2017	Sally Hawkins ‡	The Shape of Water	Elisa Esposito
2017	Jessica Chastain	Molly's Game	Molly Bloom
2017	Frances McDormand †	Three Billboards Outside Ebbing, Missouri	Mildred Hayes
2017	Margot Robbie ‡	I, Tonya	Tonya Harding
2017	Saoirse Ronan ‡	Lady Bird	Christine "Lady Bird" McPherson
2018	Toni Collette	Hereditary	Annie Graham
2018	Olivia Colman †	The Favourite	Queen Anne
2018	Lady Gaga ‡	A Star is Born	Ally Campana
2018	Nicole Kidman	Destroyer	Erin Bell
2018	Charlize Theron	Tully	Marlo Moreau
2019	Lupita Nyong'o	Us	Adelaide Wilson / Red
2019	Awkwafina	The Farewell	Billi Wang
2019	Scarlett Johansson ‡	Marriage Story	Nicole Barber
2019	Charlize Theron ‡	Bombshell	Megyn Kelly
2019	Renée Zellweger †	Judy	Judy Garland

=== 2020s ===
Year	Category	Winner and nominees	Film	Role
2020		Carey Mulligan ‡	Promising Young Woman	Casandra "Cassie" Thomas
2020		Viola Davis ‡	Ma Rainey's Black Bottom	Ma Rainey
2020		Vanessa Kirby ‡	Pieces of a Woman	Martha Weiss
2020		Frances McDormand †	Nomadland	Fern
2020		Elisabeth Moss	The Invisible Man	Cecilia Kass
2020		Zendaya	Malcolm & Marie	Marie Jones
2021		Kristen Stewart ‡	Spencer	Diana Spencer
2021		Jessica Chastain †	The Eyes of Tammy Faye	Tammy Faye Bakker
2021		Lady Gaga	House of Gucci	Patrizia Reggiani
2021		Emilia Jones	CODA	Ruby Rossi
2021		Nicole Kidman ‡	Being the Ricardos	Lucille Ball
2022		Michelle Yeoh †	Everything Everywhere All at Once	Evelyn Quan Wang
2022		Cate Blanchett ‡	Tár	Lydia Tár
2022		Viola Davis	The Woman King	General Nanisca
2022		Danielle Deadwyler	Till	Mamie Till-Mobley
2022		Michelle Williams ‡	The Fabelmans	Mitzi Fabelman
2023		Lily Gladstone ‡ (TIE)	Killers of the Flower Moon	Mollie Burkhart
2023		Margot Robbie (TIE)	Barbie	Barbie
2023		Fantasia Barrino	The Color Purple	Celie Harris-Johnson
2023		Greta Lee	Past Lives	Nora Moon
2023		Carey Mulligan ‡	Maestro	Felicia Montealegre
2023		Emma Stone †	Poor Things	Bella Baxter
2024		Cynthia Erivo ‡	Wicked	Elphaba Thropp
2024		Karla Sofía Gascón ‡	Emilia Pérez	Emilia Pérez / Juan "Manitas" Del Monte
2024		Angelina Jolie	Maria	Maria Callas
2024		Mikey Madison †	Anora	Anora "Ani" Mikheeva
2024		Demi Moore ‡	The Substance	Elisabeth Sparkle
2024		Naomi Scott	Smile 2	Skye Riley
2025	Drama	Jessie Buckley †	Hamnet	Agnes Shakespeare
2025	Drama	Julia Garner	Weapons	Justine Gandy
2025	Drama	Jennifer Lawrence	Die My Love	Grace
2025	Drama	Renate Reinsve ‡	Sentimental Value	Nora Borg
2025	Drama	Sydney Sweeney	Christy	Christy Martin
2025	Drama	Tessa Thompson	Hedda	Hedda Gabler
2025	Comedy or Musical	Amanda Seyfried	The Testament of Ann Lee	Ann Lee
2025	Comedy or Musical	Rose Byrne ‡	If I Had Legs I'd Kick You	Linda
2025	Comedy or Musical	Cynthia Erivo	Wicked: For Good	Elphaba Thropp
2025	Comedy or Musical	Chase Infiniti	One Battle After Another	Willa Ferguson
2025	Comedy or Musical	Emma Stone ‡	Bugonia	Michelle Fuller
2025	Comedy or Musical	Eva Victor	Sorry, Baby	Agnes
