= Astra Film Award for Best Director =

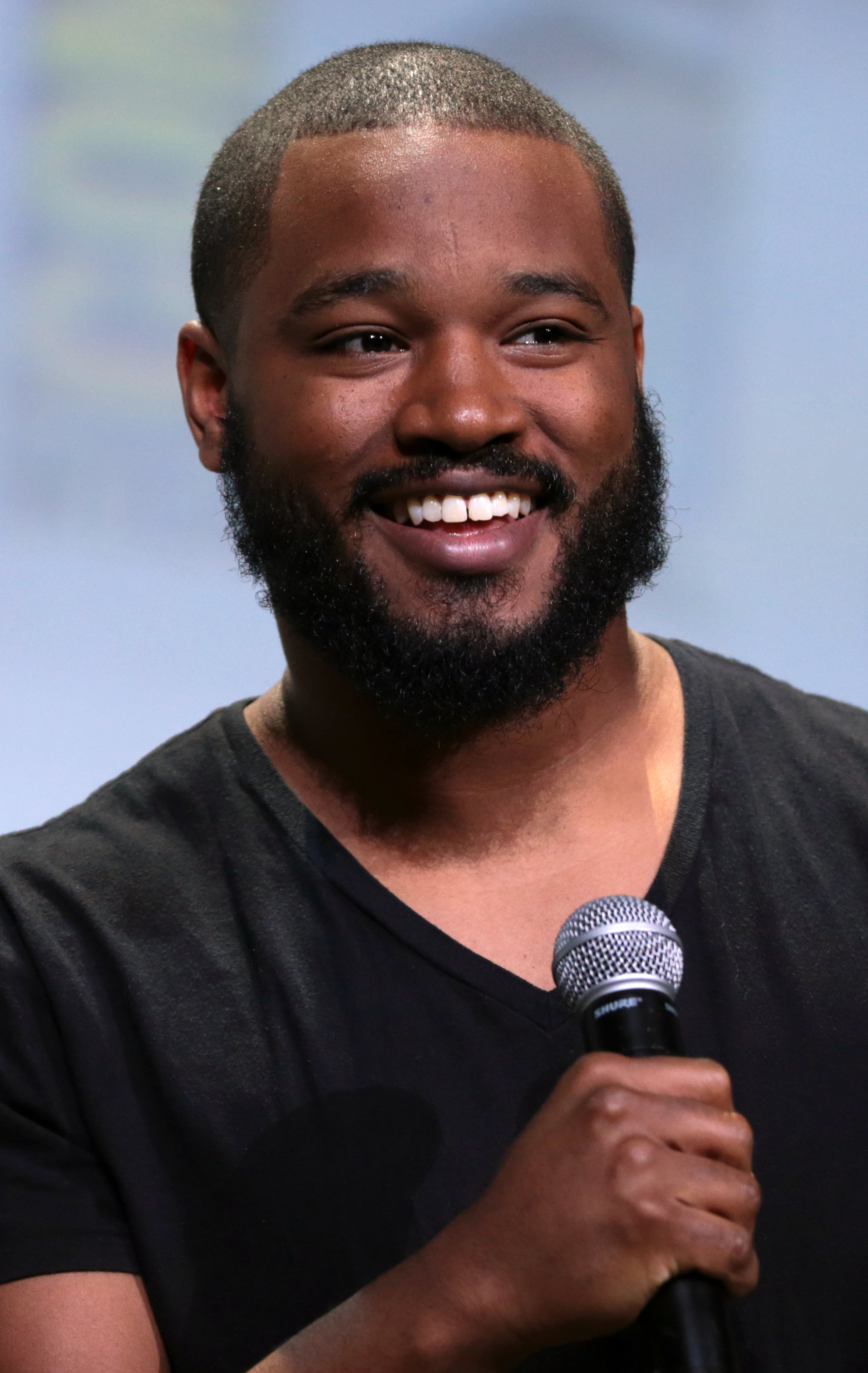
- The 2025 recipient: Ryan Coogler
- Awarded for: Best Direction of a Motion Picture
- Country: United States
- Presented by: Hollywood Creative Alliance
- First award: Female: Greta Gerwig - Lady Bird (2017); Male: Guillermo del Toro - The Shape of Water (2017)
- Currently held by: Ryan Coogler; Sinners (2025)
- Website: hollywoodcreative.org

The Astra Film Award for Best Director is one of the annual awards given out by the Hollywood Creative Alliance. From 2017 to 2020, the award was separated into two categories: Astra Film Award for Best Female Director and Astra Film Award for Best Male Director.

== Winners ==
- † = Winner of the Academy Award for Best Director
- ‡ = Nominated of the Academy Award for Best Director

=== 2010s ===
Year	Category	Winner and nominees	Film
2017	Female	Greta Gerwig ‡	Lady Bird
2017	Female	Kathryn Bigelow	Detroit
2017	Female	Sofia Coppola	The Beguiled
2017	Female	Patty Jenkins	Wonder Woman
2017	Female	Dee Rees	Mudbound
2017	Male	Guillermo del Toro †	The Shape of Water
2017	Male	Luca Guadagnino	Call Me by Your Name
2017	Male	Christopher Nolan ‡	Dunkirk
2017	Male	Jordan Peele ‡	Get Out
2017	Male	Steven Spielberg	The Post
2018	Female	Lynne Ramsay	You Were Never Really Here
2018	Female	Debra Granik	Leave No Trace
2018	Female	Marielle Heller	Can You Ever Forgive Me?
2018	Female	Tamara Jenkins	Private Life
2018	Female	Chloé Zhao	The Rider
2018	Male	Spike Lee ‡	BlacKkKlansman
2018	Male	Ryan Coogler	Black Panther
2018	Male	Bradley Cooper	A Star is Born
2018	Male	Alfonso Cuarón †	Roma
2018	Male	Yorgos Lanthimos ‡	The Favourite
2019	Female	Olivia Wilde	Booksmart
2019	Female	Greta Gerwig	Little Women
2019	Female	Alma Har'el	Honey Boy
2019	Female	Lorene Scafaria	Hustlers
2019	Female	Lulu Wang	The Farewell
2019	Male	Noah Baumbach	Marriage Story
2019	Male	Bong Joon-ho †	Parasite
2019	Male	Martin Scorsese ‡	The Irishman
2019	Male	Quentin Tarantino ‡	Once Upon a Time in Hollywood
2019	Male	Taika Waititi	Jojo Rabbit

=== 2020s ===
Year	Category	Winner and nominees	Film
2020	Female	Chloé Zhao †	Nomadland
2020	Female	Sofia Coppola	On the Rocks
2020	Female	Emerald Fennell ‡	Promising Young Woman
2020	Female	Eliza Hittman	Never Rarely Sometimes Always
2020	Female	Regina King	One Night in Miami...
2020	Male	Darius Marder	Sound of Metal
2020	Male	Lee Isaac Chung ‡	Minari
2020	Male	David Fincher ‡	Mank
2020	Male	Shaka King	Judas and the Black Messiah
2020	Male	Spike Lee	Da 5 Bloods
2021		Jane Campion † (TIE)	The Power of the Dog
2021		Denis Villeneuve (TIE)	Dune
2021		Kenneth Branagh ‡	Belfast
2021		Guillermo del Toro	Nightmare Alley
2021		Rebecca Hall	Passing
2021		Siân Heder	CODA
2021		Lin-Manuel Miranda	tick, tick... BOOM!
2021		Reinaldo Marcus Green	King Richard
2021		Pablo Larraín	Spencer
2021		Steven Spielberg ‡	West Side Story
2022		Daniel Kwan and Daniel Scheinert †	Everything Everywhere All at Once
2022		James Cameron	Avatar: The Way of Water
2022		Park Chan-wook	Decision to Leave
2022		Todd Field ‡	Tár
2022		Baz Luhrmann	Elvis
2022		Martin McDonagh ‡	The Banshees of Inisherin
2022		Sarah Polley	Women Talking
2022		Gina Prince-Bythewood	The Woman King
2022		S.S. Rajamouli	RRR
2022		Steven Spielberg ‡	The Fabelmans
2023		Christopher Nolan †	Oppenheimer
2023		Ben Affleck	Air
2023		Bradley Cooper	Maestro
2023		Emerald Fennell	Saltburn
2023		Greta Gerwig	Barbie
2023		Cord Jefferson	American Fiction
2023		Yorgos Lanthimos ‡	Poor Things
2023		Alexander Payne	The Holdovers
2023		Martin Scorsese ‡	Killers of the Flower Moon
2023		Celine Song	Past Lives
2024		Jon M. Chu	Wicked
2024		Jacques Audiard ‡	Emilia Pérez
2024		Sean Baker †	Anora
2024		Brady Corbet ‡	The Brutalist
2024		Coralie Fargeat ‡	The Substance
2024		Denis Villeneuve	Dune: Part Two
2025		Ryan Coogler ‡	Sinners
2025		Paul Thomas Anderson †	One Battle After Another
2025		Guillermo del Toro	Frankenstein
2025		Josh Safdie ‡	Marty Supreme
2025		Joachim Trier ‡	Sentimental Value
2025		Chloé Zhao ‡	Hamnet
