= The Astra Awards =

Award ceremony

- Current: 9th Astra Film Awards
- Awarded for: Excellence in cinematic achievements
- Country: United States
- Presented by: Hollywood Creative Alliance
- First award: 2017; 9 years ago
- Website: theastras.com

Television/radio coverage
- Network: ABS-CBN News; KNEKT Television Network; YouTube (@HollywoodCreativeAlliance)

The Astra Awards (formerly known as the Los Angeles Online Film Critics Society Awards and the Hollywood Critics Association Awards) is an annual awards ceremony hosted by the Hollywood Creative Alliance to recognize achievements in the entertainment industry. These awards span categories in film, television, and digital media, honoring technical and creative excellence.

== History ==
On January 10, 2018, the group held its first annual Film Awards at the Taglyan Complex in Los Angeles. On August 29, 2021, the HCA held its inaugural Hollywood Critics Association TV Awards. The event was originally to take place in-person but was shifted to virtual due to the COVID-19 pandemic. Ashley Menzel said, "Over these past 14 months, many of us have been watching more television than ever before. This is why we are absolutely delighted that our first in-person event for 2021 will begin with a brand-new event paying tribute to the best of television".

On February 28, 2022, the 5th HCA Film Awards took place at the Avalon Hollywood. Apple TV+'s CODA won Best Picture, Best Adapted Screenplay, and Best Supporting Actor for Troy Kotsur. Kristen Stewart won Best Actress for Spencer and Andrew Garfield won Best Actor for Tick, Tick... Boom!. On August 13 and 14, 2022, the HCA hosted their 2nd Annual HCA TV Awards at the Beverly Hilton. The two-night event dedicated one night to broadcast and cable networks and the other to streaming platforms. Dulcé Sloan hosted night one while Cameron Esposito hosted night two.

On October 13, 2022, HCA President Nikki Fowler announced the Inaugural Creative Arts Awards, "dedicated to celebrating those behind the scenes who don't often get the level of recognition they deserve." On December 15, 2022, Variety shared the list of nominations for the 6th HCA Film Awards and the inaugural HCA Creative Arts Awards, with A24's Everything Everywhere All at Once garnering a leading 16 nominations. On February 16, 2023, The HCA announced a new partnership with KNEKT Television Network where the Film Awards would be live-streamed on their network in addition to the official HCA app and YouTube channel.

On February 24, 2023, the 6th HCA Film Awards took place at the Beverly Wilshire Hotel. Everything Everywhere All At Once took home a total of six awards. On June 27, 2023, Awards Daily revealed the 2023 HCA Midseason Movie Awards nominees. Amazon Studios' Air and A24's Past Lives tied for the most nominations with seven each. On June 30, 2023, Gold Derby revealed the 2023 HCA Midseason Movie Awards winners. Spider-Man: Across the Spider-Verse was awarded Best Picture and Best Director. Past Lives won the most awards with three wins, including Best Actress for Greta Lee, Best Screenplay for Celine Song, and Best Indie Film.

In December 2023, the Hollywood Critics Association was renamed the Hollywood Creative Alliance, and its awards were rebranded as the Astra Awards. This change, approved by the advisory committee on November 17, 2023, led to the renaming of the HCA Film Awards, HCA TV Awards, and HCA Creative Arts Awards to the Astra Film Awards, the Astra TV Awards, and the Astra Creative Arts Awards, respectively.

The 7th Astra Film Awards took place on January 6, 2024, at the Biltmore Hotel in Los Angeles, as the first ceremony to be held under the new name. It was produced by Content.23 Media, DIGA Studios, and Vox Productions. Nominations were announced live on the official HCA YouTube channel on December 7, 2023. That same day, the Astra Film Creative Arts Awards winners were announced, with the ceremony scheduled to take place on February 26, 2024, at City Market Social House in Los Angeles, California. Barbie led in the film categories winning eight awards, including Best Picture.

On July 3, 2024, the winners of the Astra Midseason Awards were revealed via the HCA's social media channels. Dune: Part Two won Best Picture and Best Director, Zendaya won Best Actress for her performance in Challengers, and Glen Powell won Best Actor for Hit Man. The nominations for the 2024 Astra TV Awards were revealed on July 9, 2024. FX's The Bear topped the field with 15 bids followed by Max's Hacks and Hulu's Only Murders in the Building with 13 apiece for the Astra TV Awards. The ceremony was held at the Avalon Hollywood on August 18, 2024.

On November 25, 2024, the HCA revealed the nominees for their upcoming Creative Arts and Film Awards. Wicked received the most nominations with 20, followed by Dune: Part Two with 16. The HCA announced that actor, comedian, and writer Peter Kim would host the Creative Arts Awards, while two-time Emmy Award winner Loni Love would host the Film Awards. On December 8, 2024, the HCA would host a two ceremony event taking place at the Taglyan Complex in Los Angeles. Winners included Wicked for Best Picture, Timothée Chalamet for Best Actor in A Complete Unknown, Cynthia Erivo for Best Actress in Wicked, Kieran Culkin for Best Supporting Actor in A Real Pain, and a Best Supporting Actress tie between Ariana Grande in Wicked and Zoe Saldana in Emilia Pérez.

On February 20, 2026, the HCA announced the creation of the Astra Book Awards. The inaugural awards ceremony took place on April 20, 2026.

== Award ceremonies ==
=== Film Awards ===
#	Name of Ceremony	Eligibility	Date	Best Picture		Host(s)	Venue	Ref.
#	Name of Ceremony	Eligibility	Date	Comedy or Musical	Drama	Host(s)	Venue	Ref.
1st	Los Angeles Online Film Critics Society Awards	2017 in film	Wednesday, January 10, 2018	The Shape of Water		Unknown	Taglyan Complex, Los Angeles	
2nd	Los Angeles Online Film Critics Society Awards	2018 in film	Wednesday, January 9, 2019	The Hate U Give		Unknown	Taglyan Complex, Los Angeles	
3rd	Hollywood Critics Association Film Awards	2019 in film	Thursday, January 9, 2020	1917		Scott Menzel	Virtual	
4th	Hollywood Critics Association Film Awards	2020 in film	Friday, March 5, 2021	Promising Young Woman		Scott Menzel	Virtual	
5th	Hollywood Critics Association Film Awards	2021 in film	Thursday, February 28, 2022	CODA		Annaleigh Ashford	Avalon Hollywood, Los Angeles	
6th	Hollywood Critics Association Film Awards	2022 in film	Friday, February 24, 2023	Everything Everywhere All at Once		Tig Notaro	Beverly Wilshire Hotel, Beverly Hills	
7th	Astra Film Awards	2023 in film	Tuesday, January 9, 2024	Barbie		Rick Glassman	Biltmore Hotel, Los Angeles	
8th	Astra Film Awards	2024 in film	Sunday, December 8, 2024	Wicked		Loni Love	Taglyan Complex, Los Angeles	
9th	Astra Film Awards	2025 in film	Thursday, January 9, 2026	One Battle After Another	Sinners	Omar Benson Miller	Sofitel Beverly Hills Hotel, Los Angeles	

=== Midseason Movie Awards ===
#	Name of Ceremony	Eligibility	Date	Best Picture		Ref.
#	Name of Ceremony	Eligibility	Date	Winner	Runner-up	Ref.
1st	Los Angeles Online Film Critics Society Midseason Awards	January 1 – June 30, 2018	Monday, July 3, 2018	Black Panther	A Quiet Place / Paddington 2 (TIE)	
2nd	Los Angeles Online Film Critics Society Midseason Awards	January 1 – June 30, 2019	Monday, July 1, 2019	Booksmart	Rocketman	
3rd	Hollywood Critics Association Midseason Film Awards	January 1 – June 30, 2020	Thursday, July 2, 2020	Da 5 Bloods	The Invisible Man	
4th	Hollywood Critics Association Midseason Film Awards	March 1 – June 30, 2021	Thursday, July 1, 2021	In The Heights	—	
5th	Hollywood Critics Association Midseason Film Awards	January 1 – June 30, 2022	Friday, July 1, 2022	Everything Everywhere All at Once	RRR	
6th	Hollywood Critics Association Midseason Film Awards	January 1 – June 30, 2023	Friday, June 30, 2023	Spider-Man: Across the Spider-Verse	Past Lives	
7th	Astra Midseason Movie Awards	January 1 – June 30, 2024	Wednesday, July 3, 2024	Dune: Part Two	The Fall Guy	
8th	Astra Midseason Movie Awards	January 1 – June 30, 2025	Thursday, July 3, 2025	Sinners	The Life of Chuck	
9th	Astra Midseason Movie Awards	January 1 – June 30, 2026	Tuesday, June 30, 2026	Project Hail Mary	The Invite	

=== TV Awards ===
#	Name of Ceremony	Date	Best Drama series			Best Comedy series			Host(s)	Venue	Ref.
#	Name of Ceremony	Date	Broadcast	Cable	Streaming	Broadcast	Cable	Streaming	Host(s)	Venue	Ref.
1st	Hollywood Critics Association TV Awards	Wednesday, August 29, 2021	New Amsterdam	Cruel Summer	The Mandalorian	Young Rock	Resident Alien	Ted Lasso	—	Virtual	
2nd	Hollywood Critics Association TV Awards	Saturday–Sunday, August 13–14, 2022	This Is Us	Better Call Saul / Succession (TIE)	Severance	Abbott Elementary	What We Do in the Shadows	Ted Lasso	Dulcé Sloan & Cameron Esposito	Beverly Hilton, Los Angeles	
3rd	Astra TV Awards	Monday, January 8, 2024	Will Trent	Succession	The Boys	Abbott Elementary	Party Down	The Marvelous Mrs. Maisel	Aida Rodriguez	Biltmore Hotel, Los Angeles	
4th	Astra TV Awards	Sunday, December 8, 2024	Will Trent	Outlander	Shōgun	Ghosts	What We Do in the Shadows	Hacks	—	Avalon Hollywood, Hollywood	
5th	Astra TV Awards	Tuesday, June 10, 2025	Severance			The Studio			Maxi Witrak	SLS Hotel Beverly Hills, Hollywood	
6th	Astra TV Awards	Saturday, August 15, 2026	The Pitt			Hacks			Lisa Ann Walter	InterContinental, Los Angeles	

=== Creative Arts Awards ===
#	Name of Ceremony	Eligibility	Date	Most awards		Ref.
#	Name of Ceremony	Eligibility	Date	Film	Television	Ref.
1st	Hollywood Critics Association Creative Arts Awards	2022 in film	Friday, February 24, 2023	Babylon / Top Gun: Maverick (TIE)	—	
1st	Astra Creative Arts TV Awards	2023 in television	Monday, January 8, 2024	—	The Boys / RuPaul's Drag Race (TIE)	
2nd	Astra Creative Arts Awards	2023 in film	Monday, February 26, 2024	Barbie / Oppenheimer (TIE)	—	
3rd	Astra Creative Arts Awards	2024 in film	Sunday, December 8, 2024	Wicked	—	
4th	Astra Creative Arts Awards	2025 in film and in television	Thursday, December 11, 2025	Frankenstein / Sinners (TIE)	The Pitt	

=== Podcast Awards ===
#	Name of Ceremony	Eligibility	Date	Ref.
1st	Astra Podcast Awards	June 1, 2024 – August 31, 2025	Monday, October 27, 2025	

=== Book Awards ===
#	Name of Ceremony	Eligibility	Book of the Year	Date	Ref.
1st	Astra Book Awards	January 1, 2025 – February 28, 2026	Onyx Storm	Monday, April 20, 2026	

== Award categories ==
=== Film award categories ===
Each December, the association releases the nominations for the HCA Film Awards, which are held in January of the following year.

==== Current categories ====
- Best Picture – Drama (since 2025)
- Best Picture – Comedy or Musical (since 2025)
- Best Director (since 2021)
- Best Actor – Drama (since 2025)
- Best Actor – Comedy or Musical (since 2025)
- Best Actress – Drama (since 2025)
- Best Actress – Comedy or Musical (since 2025)
- Best Supporting Actor – Drama (since 2025)
- Best Supporting Actor – Comedy or Musical (since 2025)
- Best Supporting Actress – Drama (since 2025)
- Best Supporting Actress – Comedy or Musical (since 2025)
- Best Original Screenplay (since 2017)
- Best Adapted Screenplay (since 2017)
- Best Action or Science Fiction Feature (since 2017)
- Best Animated Feature (since 2017)
- Best Documentary Feature (since 2017)
- Best Indie Feature (since 2017)
- Best International Feature (since 2017)
- Best First Feature (since 2017)
- Best Voice Over Performance (since 2017)
- Best Ensemble Cast (since 2018)
- Best Horror or Thriller Feature (since 2019)
- Best Performance in a Horror or Thriller (since 2024)
- Best Book to Screen Adaptation (since 2025)
- Best Young Performer (since 2025)

==== Honorary awards ====
- Trailblazer Award (since 2017)
- Newcomer Award (since 2018)
- Acting Achievement Award (since 2018)
- Filmmaking Achievement Award (since 2019)
- Artisans Achievement Award (since 2019)
- Game Changer Award (since 2019)
- Star on the Rise (since 2019)
- Filmmaker on the Rise (since 2019)
- Inspire Award (since 2019)
- Spotlight Award (since 2019)
- Timeless Award (since 2020)

==== End of a Decade Awards ====
- Filmmaker of the Decade Award (2019)
- Actress of the Decade Award (2019)
- Actor of the Decade Award (2019)
- Producer of the Decade Award (2019)
- Next Generation Award

==== Discontinued categories ====
The Stunts and Original Song categories were moved to the Creative Arts Awards in 2024. The Picture and acting categories were split into genre-based categories in 2025.

- Best Male Director (2017–2019)
- Best Female Director (2017–2019)
- Best Stunts (2017–2023)
- Best Short Film (2020–2023)
- Best Original Song (2018–2023)
- Best International Filmmaker (2023)
- Best International Actor (2023)
- Best International Actress (2023)
- Best Picture (2017–2024)
- Best Actor (2017–2024)
- Best Actress (2017–2024)
- Best Supporting Actor (2017–2024)
- Best Supporting Actress (2017–2024)
- Best Comedy or Musical (2017–2022; 2024)
- Best Comedy (2023–2024)

=== Midseason film award categories ===
Halfway through the year, the association releases the nominations for the HCA Midseason Film Awards, which honor films that come out in the first half of the respected year. The nominations are announced the last week of June, and winners are announced the first week of July.

==== Current categories ====
- Best Picture (since 2018)
- Best Actor (since 2018)
- Best Actress (since 2018)
- Best Supporting Actor (since 2018)
- Best Supporting Actress (since 2018)
- Most Anticipated Film (since 2018)
- Best Indie Film (since 2019)
- Best Director (since 2021)
- Best Screenplay (since 2021)
- Best Horror (since 2022)
- Best Stunts (since 2023)

=== TV award categories ===
The Hollywood Critics Association announced that they were launching the HCA TV Awards on March 24, 2021. The inaugural TV awards ceremony took place on August 22, 2021. The following is a list of the current and discontinued categories of the television awards as of 2026.

==== Current categories ====
- Best Actor in a Comedy Series (since 2025)
- Best Actor in a Drama Series (since 2025)
- Best Actor in a Limited Series or TV Movie (since 2025)
- Best Actress in a Comedy Series (since 2025)
- Best Actress in a Drama Series (since 2025)
- Best Actress in a Limited Series or TV Movie (since 2025)
- Best Animated Series (2021; since 2024)
- Best Anime Series (since 2024)
- Best Book to Screen Series (since 2026)
- Best Cast Ensemble in a Broadcast Network Comedy Series (since 2025)
- Best Cast Ensemble in a Broadcast Network Drama Series (since 2025)
- Best Cast Ensemble in a Cable Comedy Series (since 2025)
- Best Cast Ensemble in a Cable Drama Series (since 2025)
- Best Cast Ensemble in a Limited Series or TV Movie (since 2025)
- Best Cast Ensemble in a Streaming Comedy Series (since 2025)
- Best Cast Ensemble in a Streaming Drama Series (since 2025)
- Best Comedy or Standup Special (2022; since 2024)
- Best Comedy Series (since 2025)
- Best Directing in a Comedy Series (since 2025)
- Best Directing in a Drama Series (since 2025)
- Best Directing in a Limited Series or TV Movie (since 2025)
- Best Documentary (since 2024)
- Best Docuseries or Nonfiction Series (since 2025)
- Best Drama Series (since 2025)
- Best Game Show (since 2022)
- Best Guest Actor in a Comedy Series (since 2023)
- Best Guest Actor in a Drama Series (since 2023)
- Best Guest Actress in a Comedy Series (since 2023)
- Best Guest Actress in a Drama Series (since 2023)
- Best Lead Voice-Over Performance (since 2025)
- Best Limited Series (since 2025)
- Best Reality Competition Series (since 2026)
- Best Reality Series (since 2024)
- Best Supporting Actor in a Comedy Series (since 2025)
- Best Supporting Actor in a Drama Series (since 2025)
- Best Supporting Actor in a Limited Series or TV Movie (since 2025)
- Best Supporting Actress in a Comedy Series (since 2025)
- Best Supporting Actress in a Drama Series (since 2025)
- Best Supporting Actress in a Limited Series or TV Movie (since 2025)
- Best Supporting Voice-Over Performance (since 2025)
- Best Talk Series (since 2023)
- Best Television Movie (since 2025)
- Best Writing in a Comedy Series (since 2025)
- Best Writing in a Drama Series (since 2025)
- Best Writing in a Limited Series or TV Movie (since 2025)

==== Discontinued categories ====
- Best Actor in a Broadcast Network or Cable Limited or Anthology Series (2022–2024)
- Best Actor in a Broadcast Network or Cable Series, Comedy (2021–2024)
- Best Actor in a Broadcast Network or Cable Series, Drama (2021–2024)
- Best Actor in a Streaming Limited or Anthology Series (2022–2024)
- Best Actor in a Streaming Series, Comedy (2021–2024)
- Best Actor in a Streaming Series, Drama (2021–2024)
- Best Actress in a Broadcast Network or Cable Limited or Anthology Series (2022–2024)
- Best Actress in a Broadcast Network or Cable Series, Comedy (2021–2024)
- Best Actress in a Broadcast Network or Cable Series, Drama (2021–2024)
- Best Actress in a Streaming Limited or Anthology Series (2022–2024)
- Best Actress in a Streaming Series, Comedy (2021–2024)
- Best Actress in a Streaming Series, Drama (2021–2024)
- Best Broadcast Network or Cable Animated Series or Television Movie (2022–2024)
- Best Broadcast Network or Cable Documentary TV Movie (2022–2023)
- Best Broadcast Network or Cable Docuseries or Non-Fiction Series (2022–2023)
- Best Broadcast Network or Cable Docuseries, Documentary Television Movie, or Non-Fiction Series (2021)
- Best Broadcast Network or Cable Limited or Anthology Series (2022–2024)
- Best Broadcast Network or Cable Live-Action Television Movie (2022–2024)
- Best Broadcast Network or Cable Sketch Series, Variety Series, Talk Show, or Comedy/Variety Special (2021–2022)
- Best Broadcast Network Reality Series, Competition Series, or Game Show (2021)
- Best Broadcast Network Reality Show or Competition Series (2022–2023)
- Best Broadcast Network Series, Comedy (2021–2024)
- Best Broadcast Network Series, Drama (2021–2024)
- Best Cable or Streaming Reality Series, Competition Series, or Game Show (2021)
- Best Cable Reality Show or Competition Series (2022–2023)
- Best Cable Series, Comedy (2021–2024)
- Best Cable Series, Drama (2021–2024)
- Best Children or Family Series (2023)
- Best Directing in a Broadcast Network or Cable Limited or Anthology Series (2022–2024)
- Best Directing in a Broadcast Network or Cable Series, Comedy (2022–2024)
- Best Directing in a Broadcast Network or Cable Series, Drama (2022–2024)
- Best Directing in a Streaming Limited or Anthology Series (2022–2024)
- Best Directing in a Streaming Series, Comedy (2022–2024)
- Best Directing in a Streaming Series, Drama (2022–2024)
- Best Docuseries (2024)
- Best Nonfiction series (2024)
- Best Saturday Night Live Host (2023)
- Best Streaming Animated Series or Television Movie (2022–2024)
- Best Streaming Documentary TV Movie (2022–2023)
- Best Streaming Docuseries or Non-Fiction Series (2022–2023)
- Best Streaming Docuseries, Documentary Television Movie, or Non-Fiction Series (2021)
- Best Streaming Limited or Anthology Series (2022–2024)
- Best Streaming Movie (2022–2024)
- Best Streaming Reality Show or Competition Series (2022–2023)
- Best Streaming Series, Comedy (2021–2024)
- Best Streaming Series, Drama (2021–2024)
- Best Streaming Sketch Series, Variety Series, Talk Show, or Comedy/Variety Special (2021–2022)
- Best Supporting Actor in a Broadcast Network or Cable Limited or Anthology Series (2022–2024)
- Best Supporting Actor in a Broadcast Network or Cable Series, Comedy (2021–2024)
- Best Supporting Actor in a Broadcast Network or Cable Series, Drama (2021–2024)
- Best Supporting Actor in a Streaming Limited or Anthology Series (2022–2024)
- Best Supporting Actor in a Streaming Series, Comedy (2021–2024)
- Best Supporting Actor in a Streaming Series, Drama (2021–2024)
- Best Supporting Actress in a Broadcast Network or Cable Limited or Anthology Series (2022–2024)
- Best Supporting Actress in a Broadcast Network or Cable Series, Comedy (2021–2024)
- Best Supporting Actress in a Broadcast Network or Cable Series, Drama (2021–2024)
- Best Supporting Actress in a Streaming Limited or Anthology Series (2022–2024)
- Best Supporting Actress in a Streaming Series, Comedy (2021–2024)
- Best Supporting Actress in a Streaming Series, Drama (2021–2024)
- Best Voice-Over Performance (2024)
- Best Writing in a Broadcast Network or Cable Limited or Anthology Series (2022–2024)
- Best Writing in a Broadcast Network or Cable Series, Drama (2022–2024)
- Best Writing in a Broadcast Network or Cable Series, Comedy (2022–2024)
- Best Writing in a Streaming Limited or Anthology Series (2022–2024)
- Best Writing in a Streaming Series, Comedy (2022–2024)
- Best Writing in a Streaming Series, Drama (2022–2024)

==== Honorary awards ====
- Generations Award (2026)
- Impact Award (2021; 2026)
- Legacy Award (2021–2022)
- Petco Love Award (2025)
- Pop Culture Icon Award (2021)
- Spotlight Award (2021–2023; 2025–2026)
- Timeless Award (2026)
- Trailblazer Award (2025)
- TV Icon Award (2021–2023)
- TV Breakout Star Award (2021–2022; 2025–2026)
- Virtuoso Award (2021–2022; 2026)

=== Creative Arts film award categories ===
The Hollywood Critics Association announced the launch of the HCA Creative Arts Film Awards on October 13, 2022. The inaugural Creative Awards ceremony took place on February 24, 2023.

==== Current categories ====
- Best Casting (since 2022)
- Best Cinematography (since 2022)
- Best Costume Design (since 2022)
- Best Editing (since 2022)
- Best Hair & Make-Up (since 2022)
- Best Marketing Campaign (since 2022)
- Best Production Design (since 2022)
- Best Score (since 2022)
- Best Sound (since 2022)
- Best Visual Effects (since 2022)
- Best Stunts (since 2024)
- Best Stunt Coordinator (since 2024)
- Best Original Song (since 2024)
- Best Second Unit Director (since 2025)

=== Creative Arts TV awards categories ===
Along with announcement of the 3rd HCA TV Awards, the Hollywood Critics Association announced the launch of the HCA Creative Arts TV Awards along with the TV awards, with the ceremony being held on January 8, 2024. The Creative Arts TV Awards did not return the following year.

==== Current categories ====
- Best Casting (since 2025)
- Best Choreography (since 2025)
- Best Cinematography (since 2025)
- Best Costume Design (since 2025)
- Best Editing (since 2025)
- Best Hairstyling (since 2025)
- Best Main Title Design (since 2025)
- Best Makeup (since 2025)
- Best Original Song (since 2025)
- Best Production Design (since 2025)
- Best Score (since 2025)
- Best Sound (since 2025)
- Best Stunts (since 2025)
- Best Visual Effects (since 2025)

==== Discontinued categories ====
- Best Broadcast Network or Cable Animated Series or Television Movie (2023)
- Best Broadcast Network or Cable Comedy Special (2023)
- Best Broadcast Network or Cable Documentary TV Movie (2023)
- Best Broadcast Network or Cable Docuseries or Non-Fiction Series (2023)
- Best Broadcast Network Reality Show or Competition Series (2023)
- Best Cable Reality Show or Competition Series (2023)
- Best Casting in a Limited Series or TV Movie (2023)
- Best Casting in a Series, Comedy (2023)
- Best Casting in a Series, Drama (2023)
- Best Contemporary Costumes (2023)
- Best Fantasy or Science Fiction Costumes (2023)
- Best Game Show (2023)
- Best Guest Actor in a Series, Comedy (2023)
- Best Guest Actor in a Series, Drama (2023)
- Best Guest Actress in a Series, Comedy (2023)
- Best Guest Actress in a Series, Drama (2023)
- Best International Series (2023)
- Best Main Title Design (2023)
- Best Original Song (2023)
- Best Period Costumes (2023)
- Best Score in a Comedy Series (2023)
- Best Score in a Drama Series (2023)
- Best Score in a Limited Series or TV Movie (2023)
- Best Short Form Series (2023)
- Best Streaming Animated Series or Television Movie (2023)
- Best Streaming Comedy Special (2023)
- Best Streaming Documentary Movie (2023)
- Best Streaming Docuseries or Non-Fiction Series (2023)
- Best Streaming Reality Show or Competition Series (2023)
- Best Stunts (2023)
- Best Talk Show (2023)
- Best Variety Series or Variety Special (2023)
- Best Voice-Over Performance (2023)

=== Book awards categories ===
- Best Autobiography or Memoir
- Best Biography
- Best Celebrity Book
- Best Children’s Book
- Best Comic or Graphic Novel
- Best Fantasy
- Best Fiction
- Best First Book
- Best Historical Fiction
- Best Horror
- Best LGBTQ+
- Best Mystery
- Best Non-Fiction
- Best Romance
- Best Romantasy
- Best Science Fiction
- Best Thriller
- Best True Crime
- Best Young Adult
- Book of the Year
