= 9th Astra Film Awards =

Astra Film Awards

- Date: January 9, 2026
- Site: Sofitel Beverly Hills Hotel, Los Angeles
- Hosted by: Omar Benson Miller
- Official website: theastras.com

Highlights
- Best Picture: Sinners
- Most awards: Sinners (6)
- Most nominations: One Battle After Another (11); Sinners (11)

Television coverage
- Network: KNEKT Television Network; YouTube (@TheAstraAwards)

The 9th Astra Film Awards, presented by the Hollywood Creative Alliance, took place on January 9, 2026, at the Sofitel Beverly Hills Hotel in Los Angeles. The nominations were announced on November 25, 2025.

The action thriller film One Battle After Another and the period supernatural horror film Sinners led the nominations with eleven each, followed by the Norwegian drama film Sentimental Value with nine. Sinners ultimately won the most awards with six wins, including Best Picture – Drama and Best Director (Ryan Coogler).

The ceremony was live-streamed across multiple platforms, including the official Astra Awards YouTube channel, Instagram and X accounts, and on KNEKT.tv. Actor Omar Benson Miller hosted the ceremony.

== Ceremony information ==
This is the third ceremony following the rebranding to The Astra Awards by the Hollywood Creative Alliance. Additionally, this year marked the introduction of genre-based categories; Picture and acting awards were split into two separate categories: "Drama" and "Comedy or Musical". The proposed change was put to a full vote of the HCA membership. In addition to the main broadcast, an exclusive pre-show aired on KNEKT.tv, and on the Astra Awards' Instagram and YouTube channel, featuring interviews with honorees and nominees prior to the ceremony.

Nominated for "Best Performance in a Horror or Thriller" for his performance in Good Boy as himself, Indy the dog's nomination made film awards history, as Indy is now the first canine to be nominated for a major film acting award that had previously recognized only human talent. The film is told entirely from the dog's perspective, using his natural behaviors. (Note: Attributed to multiple references:) Ultimately, Indy won the award, making further history as the first animal to win a major film acting award. Though not in attendance, the film's director and owner of Indy, Ben Leonberg, accepted the award via an acceptance speech video, with Indy by his side, that was published on the Astra Awards Instagram account and YouTube channel the following day. The result, however, was criticized by social media users, who expressed their thoughts and outrage online.

Initially, Best Original Score and Best Original Song were announced as part of the Creative Arts Awards ceremony, but was later moved to the main awards ceremony. Furthermore, the category "Best Comedy" was retired while "Best Book to Screen Adaptation" made its debut.

== Winners and nominees ==
Winners are listed first and highlighted with boldface.

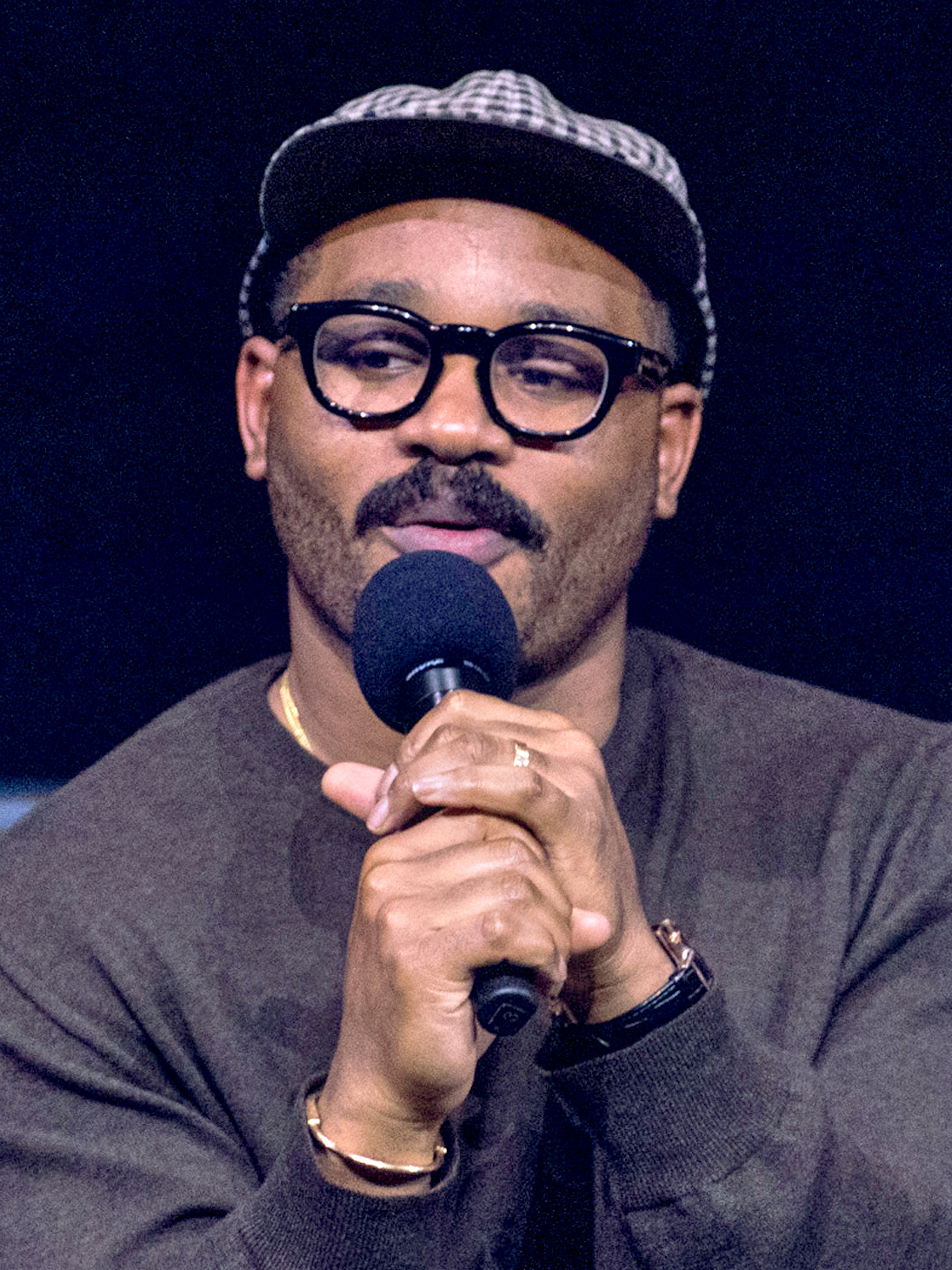
Ryan Coogler, Best Director and Best Original Screenplay winner

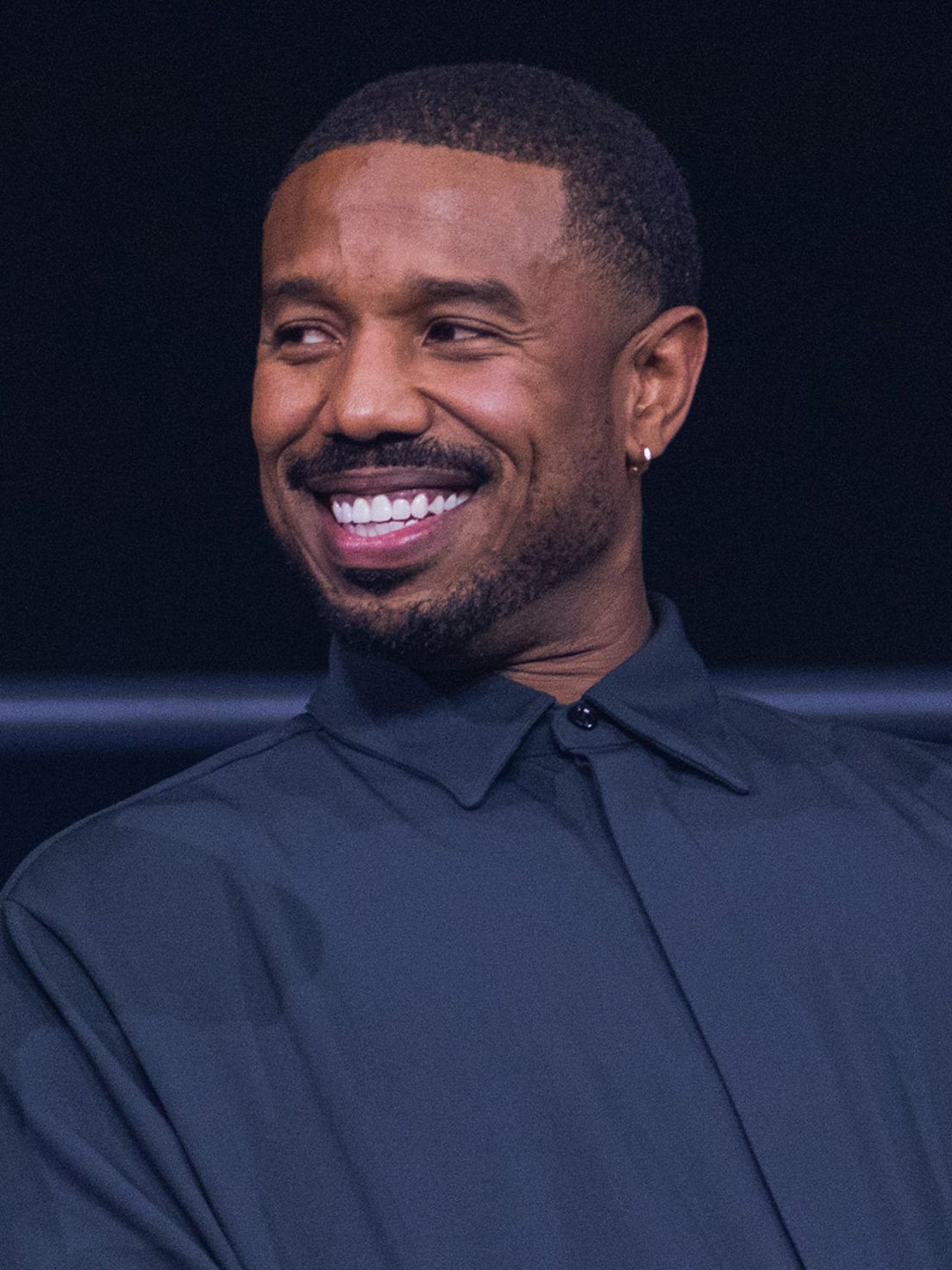
Michael B. Jordan, Best Actor – Drama winner

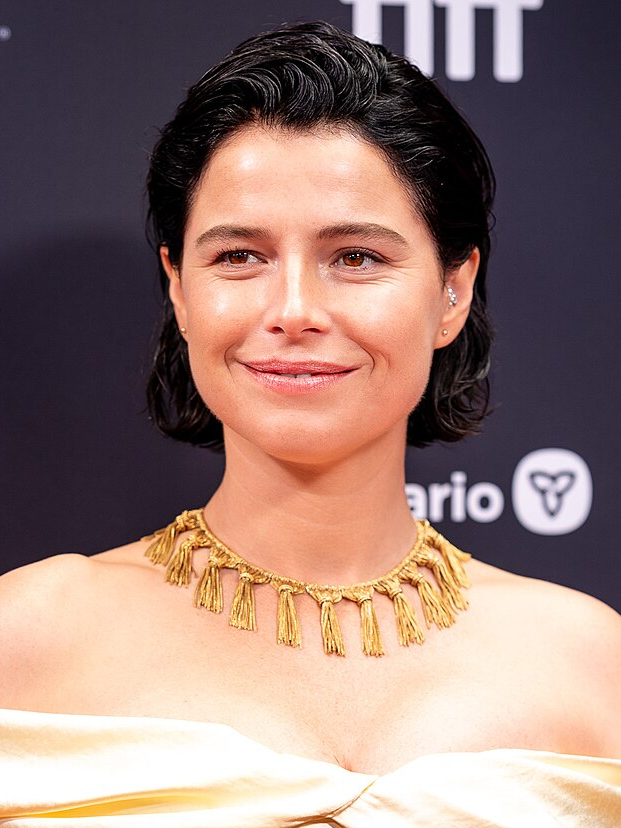
Jessie Buckley, Best Actress – Drama winner

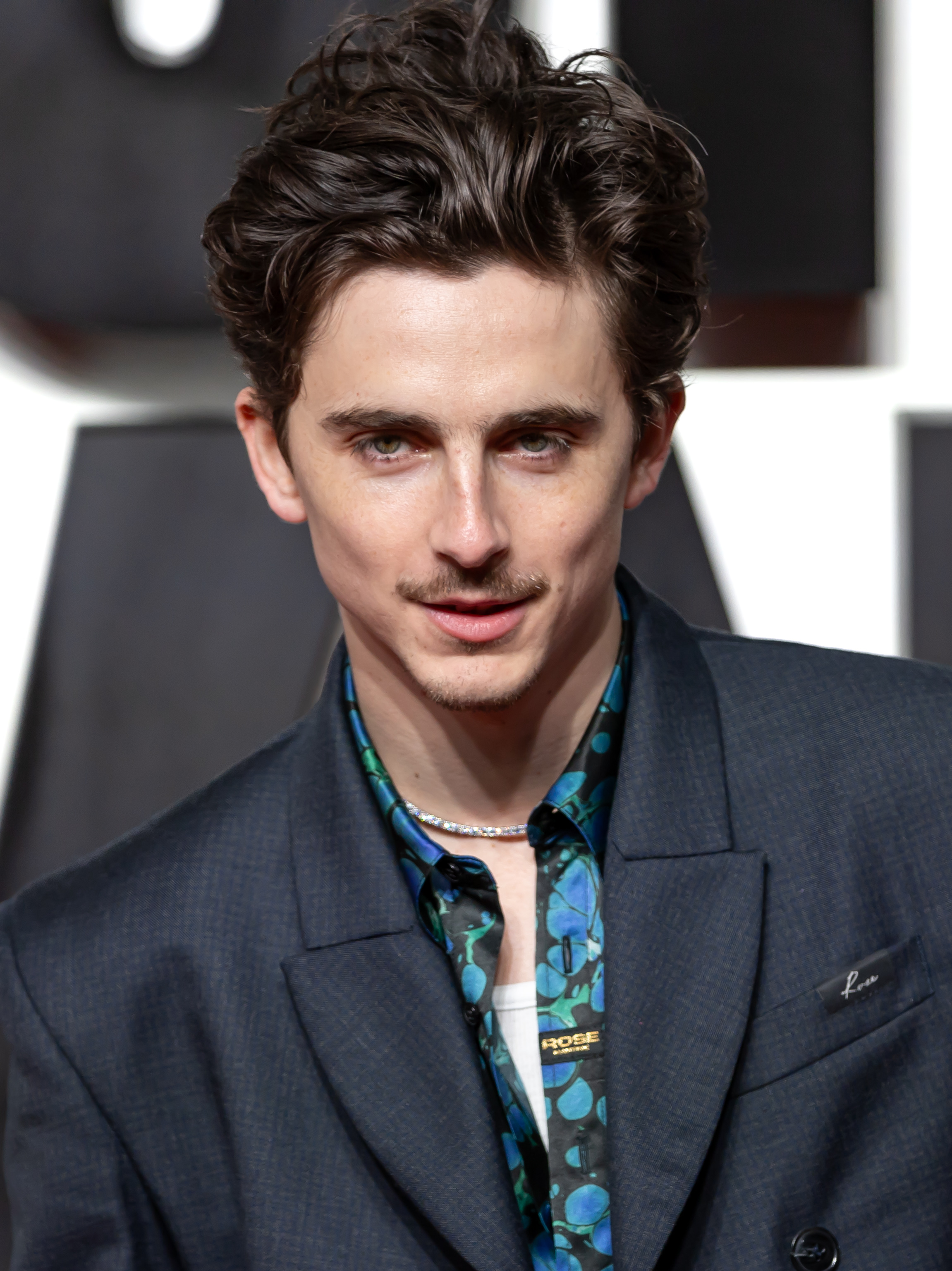
Timothée Chalamet, Best Actor – Comedy or Musical winner

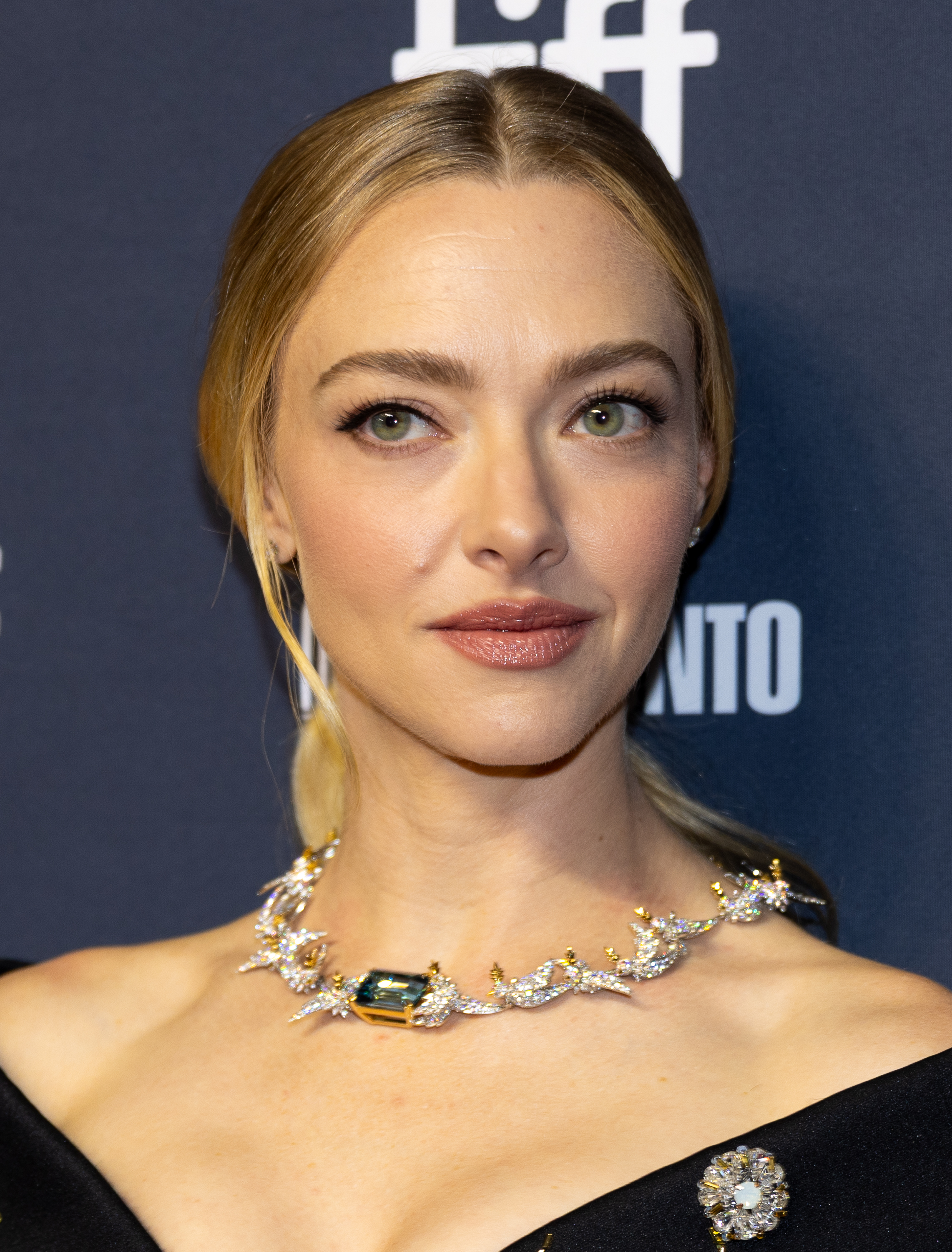
Amanda Seyfried, Best Actress – Comedy or Musical winner

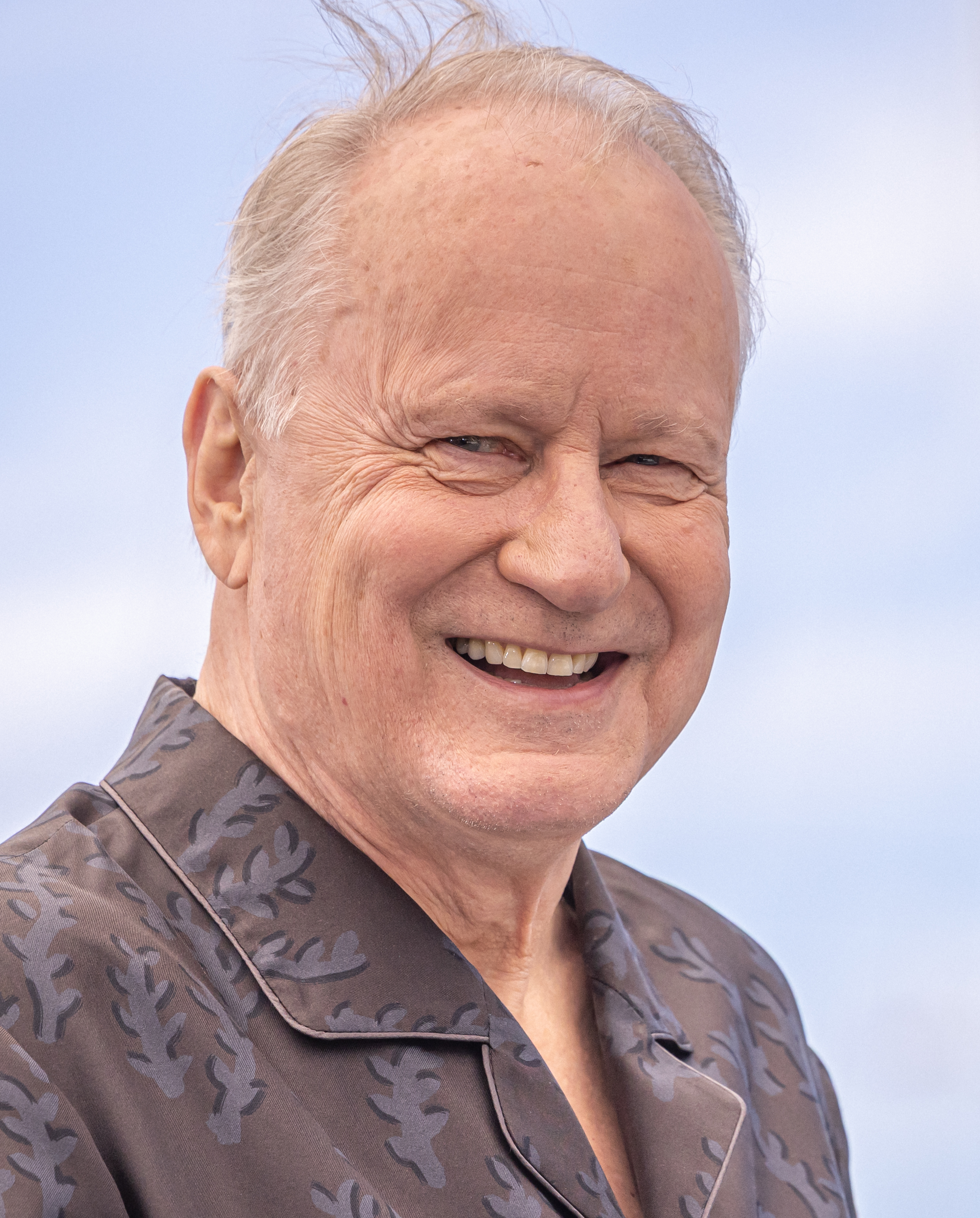
Stellan Skarsgård, Best Supporting Actor – Drama winner

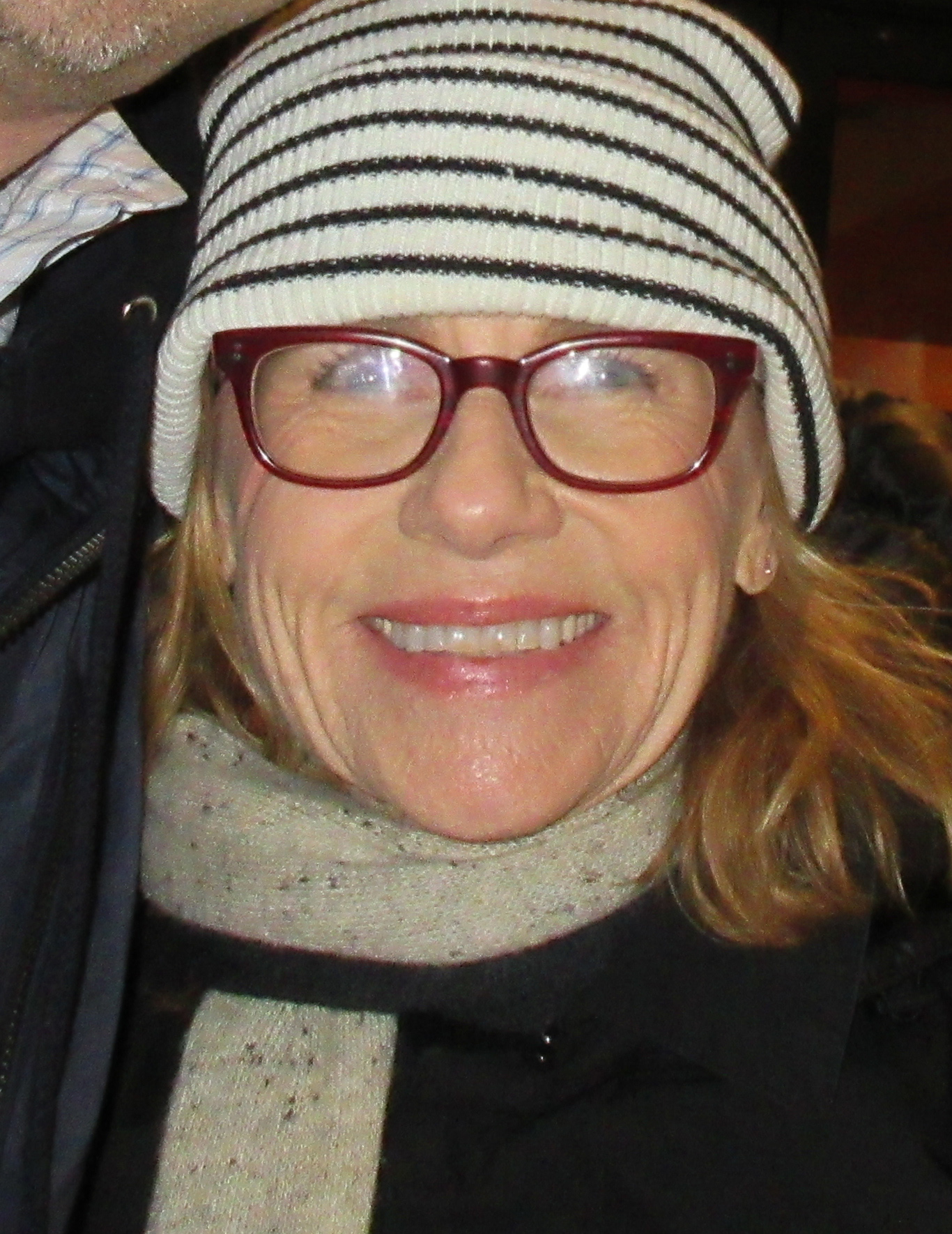
Amy Madigan, Best Supporting Actress – Drama winner

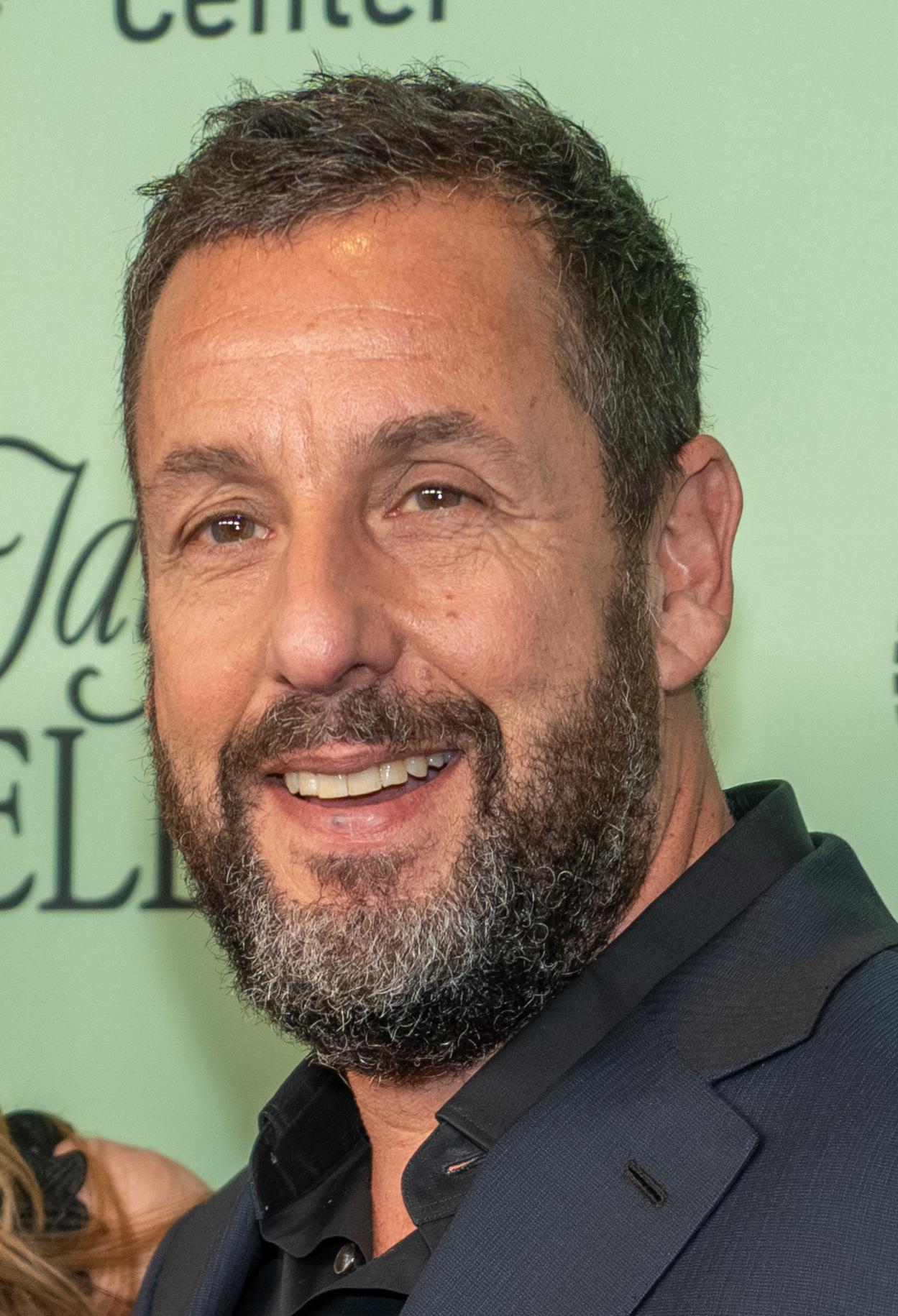
Adam Sandler, Best Supporting Actor – Comedy or Musical winner

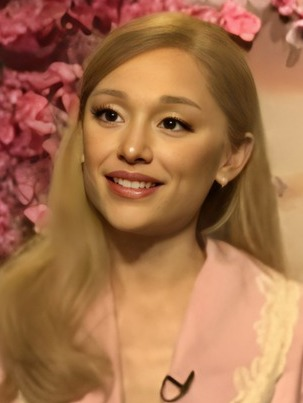
Ariana Grande, Best Supporting Actress – Comedy or Musical winner

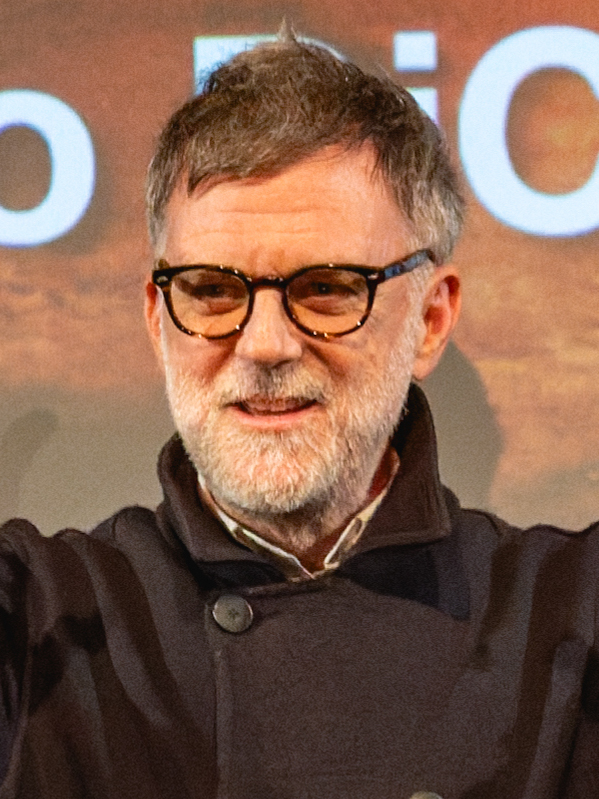
Paul Thomas Anderson, Best Adapted Screenplay winner

**Best Picture – Drama**: **Sinners**; Frankenstein; Hamnet; It Was Just an Accident; Sentimental Value; Train Dreams	**Best Picture – Comedy or Musical**: **One Battle After Another**; Bugonia; Jay Kelly; Marty Supreme; No Other Choice; Wicked: For Good
**Best Actor – Drama**: **Michael B. Jordan – Sinners as Elijah "Smoke" Moore / Elias "Stack" Moore**; Joel Edgerton – Train Dreams as Robert Grainier; Dwayne Johnson – The Smashing Machine as Mark Kerr; Wagner Moura – The Secret Agent as Marcelo Alves / Armando Solimões / Fernando Solimões; Dylan O'Brien – Twinless as Roman / Rocky; Jeremy Allen White – Springsteen: Deliver Me from Nowhere as Bruce Springsteen	**Best Actress – Drama**: **Jessie Buckley – Hamnet as Agnes Shakespeare**; Julia Garner – Weapons as Justine Gandy; Jennifer Lawrence – Die My Love as Grace; Renate Reinsve – Sentimental Value as Nora Borg; Sydney Sweeney – Christy as Christy Martin; Tessa Thompson – Hedda as Hedda Gabler
**Best Actor – Comedy or Musical**: **Timothée Chalamet – Marty Supreme as Marty Mauser**; Lee Byung-hun – No Other Choice as Yoo Man-su; George Clooney – Jay Kelly as Jay Kelly; Leonardo DiCaprio – One Battle After Another as Bob Ferguson; Brendan Fraser – Rental Family as Phillip Vandarploeug; Jesse Plemons – Bugonia as Teddy Gatz	**Best Actress – Comedy or Musical**: **Amanda Seyfried – The Testament of Ann Lee as Ann Lee**; Rose Byrne – If I Had Legs I'd Kick You as Linda; Cynthia Erivo – Wicked: For Good as Elphaba Thropp; Chase Infiniti – One Battle After Another as Willa Ferguson; Emma Stone – Bugonia as Michelle Fuller; Eva Victor – Sorry, Baby as Agnes
**Best Supporting Actor – Drama**: **Stellan Skarsgård – Sentimental Value as Gustav Borg**; Miles Caton – Sinners as Samuel "Sammie" Moore; Jacob Elordi – Frankenstein as The Creature; David Jonsson – The Long Walk as Peter "Pete" McVries; Delroy Lindo – Sinners as Delta Slim; Paul Mescal – Hamnet as William Shakespeare	**Best Supporting Actress – Drama**: **Amy Madigan – Weapons as Gladys**; Elle Fanning – Sentimental Value as Rachel Kemp; Nina Hoss – Hedda as Eileen Lovborg; Inga Ibsdotter Lilleaas – Sentimental Value as Agnes Borg Pettersen; Wunmi Mosaku – Sinners as Annie; Hailee Steinfeld – Sinners as Mary
**Best Supporting Actor – Comedy or Musical**: **Adam Sandler – Jay Kelly as Ron Sukenick**; Jonathan Bailey – Wicked: For Good as Fiyero Tigelaar; Benicio del Toro – One Battle After Another as Sensei Sergio St. Carlos; Josh O'Connor – Wake Up Dead Man: A Knives Out Mystery as Fr. Jud Duplenticy; Sean Penn – One Battle After Another as Col. Steven J. Lockjaw; Keanu Reeves – Good Fortune as Gabriel	**Best Supporting Actress – Comedy or Musical**: **Ariana Grande – Wicked: For Good as Galinda "Glinda" Upland**; Odessa A'zion – Marty Supreme as Rachel Mizler; Glenn Close – Wake Up Dead Man: A Knives Out Mystery as Martha Delacroix; Regina Hall – One Battle After Another as Deandra; Gwyneth Paltrow – Marty Supreme as Kay Stone; Teyana Taylor – One Battle After Another as Perfidia Beverly Hills
**Best Original Screenplay**: **Sinners – Ryan Coogler**; Jay Kelly – Noah Baumbach and Emily Mortimer; Marty Supreme – Ronald Bronstein and Josh Safdie; Rental Family – Hikari; Sentimental Value – Joachim Trier and Eskil Vogt; Weapons – Zach Cregger	**Best Adapted Screenplay**: **One Battle After Another – Paul Thomas Anderson**; Bugonia – Will Tracy; Frankenstein – Guillermo del Toro; Hamnet – Chloé Zhao and Maggie O'Farrell; No Other Choice – Park Chan-wook, Lee Kyoung-mi, Don McKellar, and Lee Ja-hye; Train Dreams – Clint Bentley and Greg Kwedar
**Best Book to Screen Adaptation**: **The Housemaid**; How to Train Your Dragon; The Life of Chuck; The Long Walk; Mickey 17; Superman	**Best Director**: **Ryan Coogler – Sinners**; Paul Thomas Anderson – One Battle After Another; Guillermo del Toro – Frankenstein; Josh Safdie – Marty Supreme; Joachim Trier – Sentimental Value; Chloé Zhao – Hamnet
**Best Animated Feature**: **KPop Demon Hunters**; Arco; Demon Slayer: Kimetsu no Yaiba – The Movie: Infinity Castle; In Your Dreams; Little Amélie or the Character of Rain; Zootopia 2	**Best Voice Over Performance**: **Arden Cho – KPop Demon Hunters as Rumi**; Nick Offerman – The Life of Chuck as the narrator; Will Patton – Train Dreams as the narrator; Natalie Portman – Arco as Iris' mother; Shakira – Zootopia 2 as Gazelle; Scarlett Sher – Weapons as the narrator
**Best Horror or Thriller Feature**: **Weapons**; 28 Years Later; Black Phone 2; Bring Her Back; Final Destination Bloodlines; Together	**Best Performance in a Horror or Thriller**: **Indy the dog – Good Boy as himself**; Alison Brie – Together as Millie Wilson; Ethan Hawke – Black Phone 2 as The Grabber; Sally Hawkins – Bring Her Back as Laura; Sophie Thatcher – Companion as Iris; Alfie Williams – 28 Years Later as Spike
**Best Cast Ensemble**: **Sinners**; Jay Kelly; One Battle After Another; Sentimental Value; Wake Up Dead Man: A Knives Out Mystery; Wicked: For Good	**Best Action or Sci-Fiction Feature**: **Superman**; F1; The Fantastic Four: First Steps; Mickey 17; Mission: Impossible – The Final Reckoning; Warfare
**Best Documentary Feature**: **The Perfect Neighbor**; Cover-Up; It's Never Over, Jeff Buckley; My Mom Jayne; Orwell: 2+2=5; Zodiac Killer Project	**Best International Feature**: **Sentimental Value**; Belén; It Was Just an Accident; No Other Choice; The Secret Agent; Sirāt
**Best Indie Feature**: **Twinless**; Bob Trevino Likes It; The Chronology of Water; Die My Love; Sorry, Baby; Urchin	**Best First Feature**: **Sorry, Baby**; Bob Trevino Likes It; The Chronology of Water; Eleanor the Great; Good Boy; ~~Twinless~~ (Note: The nomination for Twinless in "Best First Feature" was revoked hours after the nominations were revealed given it was not director James Sweeney's first feature.)
**Best Original Score**: **Ludwig Göransson – Sinners**; Alexandre Desplat – Frankenstein; Hildur Guðnadóttir – Hedda; Jonny Greenwood – One Battle After Another; Max Richter – Hamnet; Nicholas Britell – Jay Kelly	**Best Original Song**: **"Golden" from KPop Demon Hunters – Music and lyrics by EJAE, Mark Sonnenblick, IDO, 24, and TEDDY**; "Clothed by the Sun" from The Testament of Ann Lee – Music and lyrics by Daniel Blumberg; "The Girl in the Bubble" from Wicked: For Good – Music and lyrics by Stephen Schwartz; "I Lied to You" from Sinners – Music and lyrics by Raphael Saadiq and Ludwig Göransson; "No Place Like Home" from Wicked: For Good – Music and lyrics by Stephen Schwartz; "Train Dreams" from Train Dreams – Music and lyrics by Nick Cave and Bryce Dessner
**Best Young Performer**: **Jacobi Jupe – Hamnet as Hamnet Shakespeare**; Marissa Bode – Wicked: For Good as Nessarose Thropp; Aidan Delbis – Bugonia as Don; Shannon Mahina Gorman – Rental Family as Mia Kawasaki; Ana Sophia Heger – She Rides Shotgun as Polly Huff; Madeleine McGraw – Black Phone 2 as Gwen

== Honorary awards ==
- Virtuoso Award – Zoey Deutch
- Vanguard Award – Elle Fanning
- Timeless Award – Sharon Stone
- Filmmaker on the Rise Award – Hikari
- Game Changer Award – Dylan O'Brien
- Trailblazer Award – Jennifer Love Hewitt
- Excellence in Artistry Award – Mark Hamill
- Acting Achievement Award – Wagner Moura
- Star on the Rise Award – Madeleine McGraw
- Artisan Achievement Award – Myron Kerstein
- Petco Love Impact Award – Amanda Seyfried
- Filmmaking Achievement Award – Park Chan-wook
- Independent Spotlight Award – Bob Trevino Likes It
- Animation is Cinema Award – Demon Slayer: Kimetsu no Yaiba – The Movie: Infinity Castle

== Films with multiple wins ==
The following films received multiple awards:

Wins	Film
6	Sinners
3	KPop Demon Hunters
2	Hamnet
2	One Battle After Another
2	Sentimental Value
2	Weapons

== Films with multiple nominations ==
The following films received multiple nominations: (Note: Sources, including the official Astra Awards press release, listed incorrect totals for nomination counts.)

Nominations	Film
11	One Battle After Another
11	Sinners
9	Sentimental Value
8	Wicked: For Good
7	Hamnet
6	Jay Kelly
6	Marty Supreme
5	Bugonia
5	Frankenstein
5	Train Dreams
5	Weapons
4	No Other Choice
3	Black Phone 2
3	Hedda
3	KPop Demon Hunters
3	Rental Family
3	Sorry, Baby
3	Wake Up Dead Man: A Knives Out Mystery
2	28 Years Later
2	Arco
2	Bob Trevino Likes It
2	Bring Her Back
2	The Chronology of Water
2	Die My Love
2	Good Boy
2	It Was Just An Accident
2	The Life of Chuck
2	The Long Walk
2	Mickey 17
2	The Secret Agent
2	Superman
2	The Testament of Ann Lee
2	Together
2	Twinless
2	Zootopia 2

== See also ==
- 5th Astra TV Awards
- 4th Astra Creative Arts Awards
- 8th Astra Midseason Movie Awards
