= Astra Film Award for Best Supporting Actor =

Annual award given by Hollywood Creative Alliance

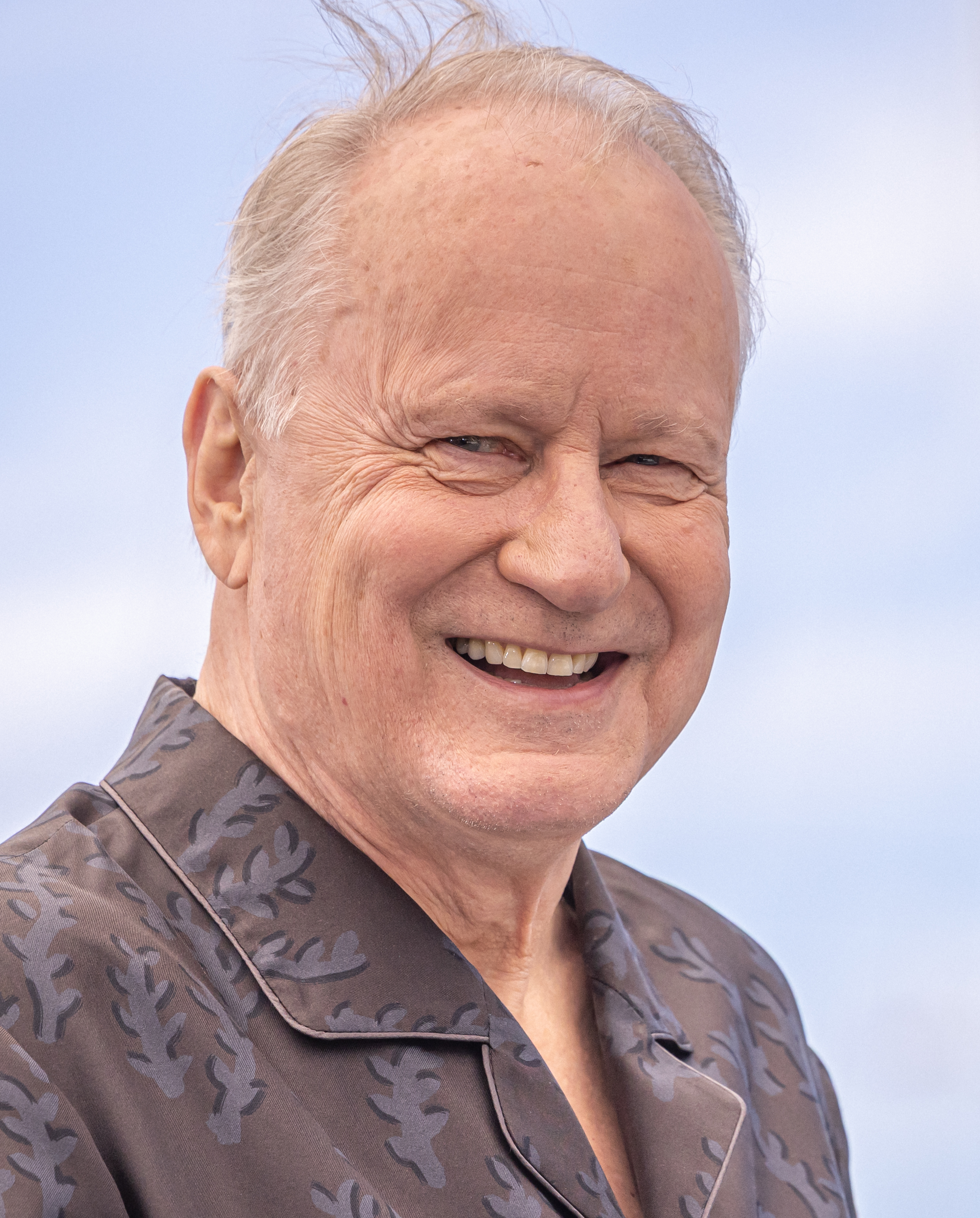
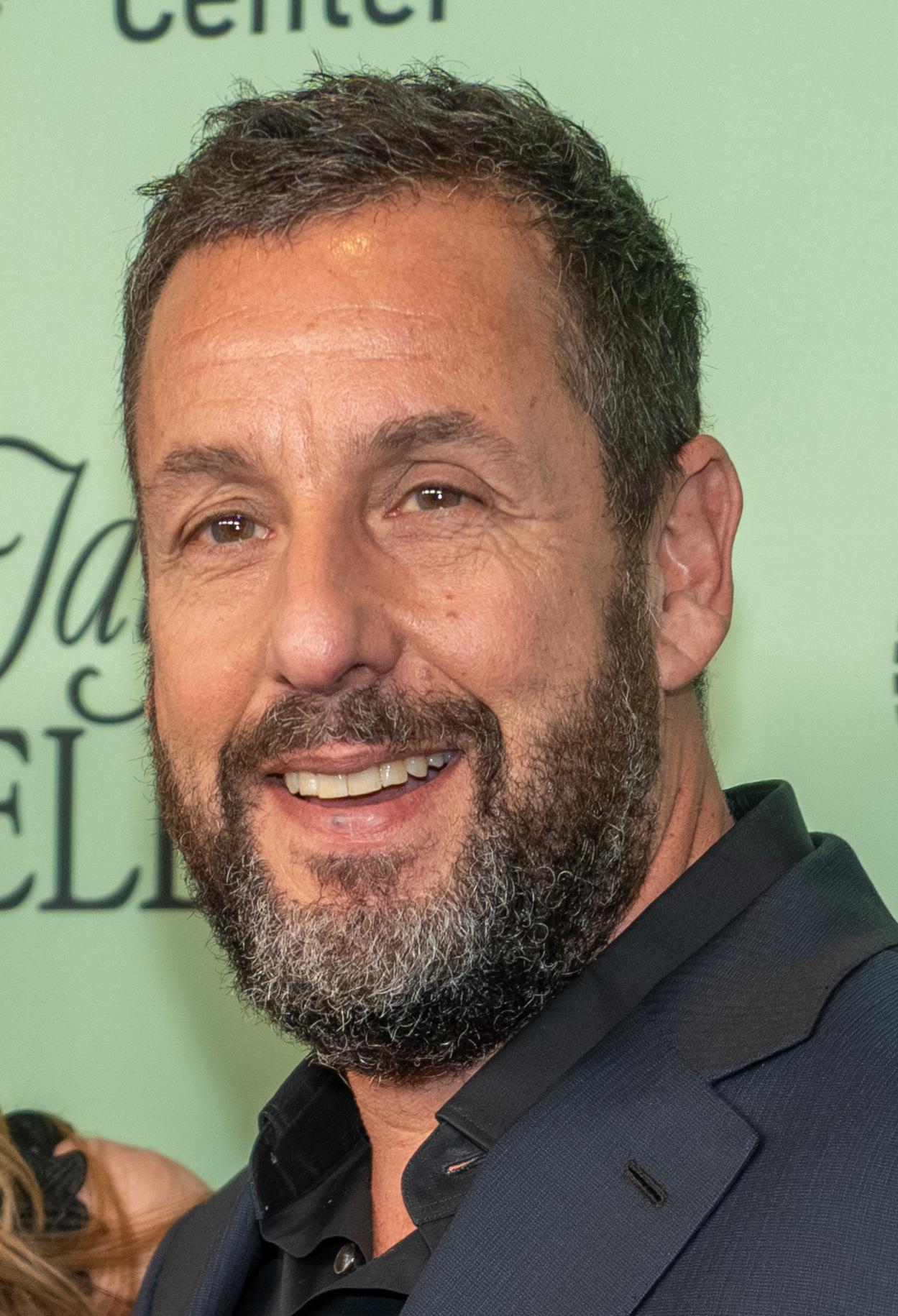
- The 2025 recipients: Stellan Skarsgård and Adam Sandler
- Awarded for: Best Supporting Actor in a Drama Motion Picture; Best Supporting Actor in a Comedy or Musical Motion Picture
- Country: United States
- Presented by: Hollywood Creative Alliance
- First award: Michael Stuhlbarg; Call Me by Your Name (2017) / Patrick Stewart; Logan (2017)
- Currently held by: Drama: Stellan Skarsgård – Sentimental Value (2025); Comedy or Musical: Adam Sandler – Jay Kelly (2025)

The Astra Film Award for Best Supporting Actor - Drama and the Astra Film Award for Best Supporting Actor - Comedy or Musical are two of the annual awards given out by the Hollywood Creative Alliance. Prior to 2025, the category was combined into a single category, the Astra Film Award for Best Supporting Actor.

== Winners ==
- † = Winner of the Academy Award for Best Supporting Actor
- ‡ = Nominated of the Academy Award for Best Supporting Actor

=== 2010s ===
Year	Winner and nominees	Film	Role
2017	Michael Stuhlbarg (TIE)	Call Me by Your Name	Mr. Perlman
2017	Patrick Stewart (TIE)	Logan	Charles Xavier
2017	Willem Dafoe ‡	The Florida Project	Bobby Hicks
2017	Idris Elba	Molly's Game	Charlie Jaffey
2017	Sam Rockwell †	Three Billboards Outside Ebbing, Missouri	Jason Dixon
2018	Mahershala Ali †	Green Book	Don Shirley
2018	Adam Driver ‡	BlacKkKlansman	Detective Philip "Flip" Zimmerman
2018	Sam Elliott ‡	A Star is Born	Bobby Maine
2018	Richard E. Grant ‡	Can You Ever Forgive Me?	Jack Hock
2018	Russell Hornsby	The Hate U Give	Maverick "Mav" Carter
2019	Joe Pesci ‡	The Irishman	Russell Bufalino
2019	Sterling K. Brown	Waves	Ronald Williams
2019	Tom Hanks ‡	A Beautiful Day in the Neighborhood	Fred Rogers
2019	Shia LaBeouf	Honey Boy	James Lort
2019	Brad Pitt †	Once Upon a Time in Hollywood	Cliff Booth

=== 2020s ===
Year	Category	Winner and nominees	Film	Role
2020		Paul Raci ‡	Sound of Metal	Joe
2020		Chadwick Boseman	Da 5 Bloods	Norman “Stormin' Norman” Earl Holloway
2020		Bo Burnham	Promising Young Woman	Ryan Cooper
2020		Daniel Kaluuya †	Judas and the Black Messiah	Fred Hampton
2020		Leslie Odom, Jr. ‡	One Night in Miami...	Sam Cooke
2021		Troy Kotsur †	CODA	Frank Rossi
2021		Jamie Dornan	Belfast	Pa
2021		Ciarán Hinds ‡	Belfast	Pop
2021		Jason Isaacs	Mass	Jay Perry
2021		Robin de Jesús	tick, tick... BOOM!	Michael
2022		Ke Huy Quan †	Everything Everywhere All at Once	Waymond Yang
2022		Brendan Gleeson ‡	The Banshees of Inisherin	Colm Doherty
2022		Brian Tyree Henry ‡	Causeway	James Aucoin
2022		Barry Keoghan ‡	The Banshees of Inisherin	Dominic Kearney
2022		Ben Whishaw	Women Talking	August
2023		Ryan Gosling ‡	Barbie	Ken
2023		Colman Domingo	The Color Purple	Albert "Mister" Johnson
2023		Robert Downey Jr. †	Oppenheimer	Lewis Strauss
2023		Glenn Howerton	BlackBerry	Jim Balsillie
2023		Charles Melton	May December	Joe Yoo
2023		Dominic Sessa	The Holdovers	Angus Tully
2024		Kieran Culkin †	A Real Pain	Benji Kaplan
2024		Jonathan Bailey	Wicked	Fiyero Tigelaar
2024		Yura Borisov ‡	Anora	Igor
2024		Clarence Maclin	Sing Sing	Himself
2024		Guy Pearce ‡	The Brutalist	Harrison Lee Van Buren Sr.
2024		Denzel Washington	Gladiator II	Macrinus
2025	Drama	Stellan Skarsgård ‡	Sentimental Value	Gustav Borg
2025	Drama	Miles Caton	Sinners	Samuel "Sammie" Moore
2025	Drama	Jacob Elordi ‡	Frankenstein	The Creature
2025	Drama	David Jonsson	The Long Walk	Peter "Pete" McVries (#23)
2025	Drama	Delroy Lindo ‡	Sinners	Delta Slim
2025	Drama	Paul Mescal	Hamnet	William Shakespeare
2025	Comedy or Musical	Adam Sandler	Jay Kelly	Ron Sukenick
2025	Comedy or Musical	Jonathan Bailey	Wicked: For Good	Fiyero Tigelaar
2025	Comedy or Musical	Benicio del Toro ‡	One Battle After Another	Sergio St. Carlos
2025	Comedy or Musical	Josh O'Connor	Wake Up Dead Man	Rev. Jud Duplenticy
2025	Comedy or Musical	Sean Penn †	One Battle After Another	Col. Steven J. Lockjaw
2025	Comedy or Musical	Keanu Reeves	Good Fortune	Gabriel
