= Astra Film Award for Best Actor =

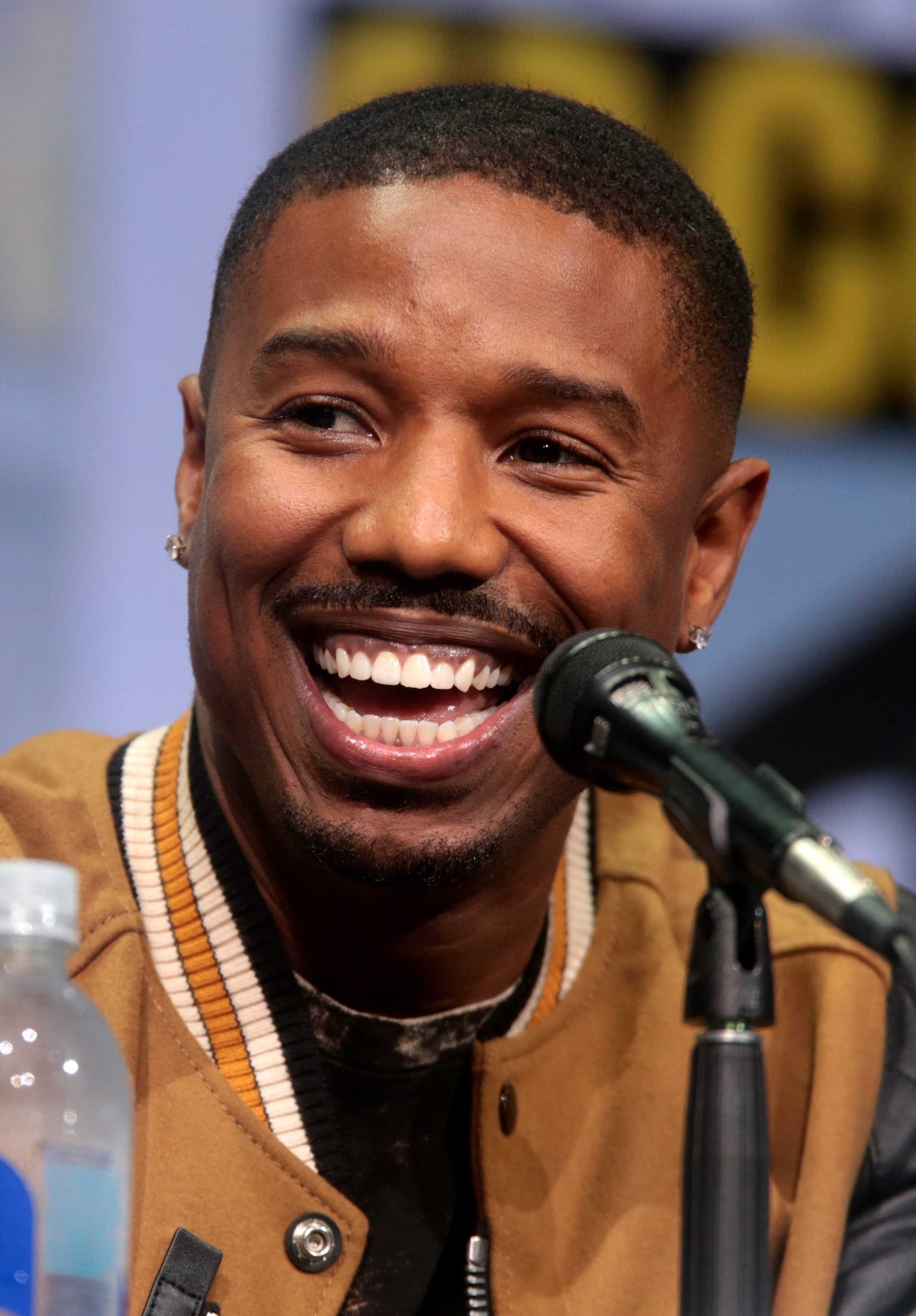
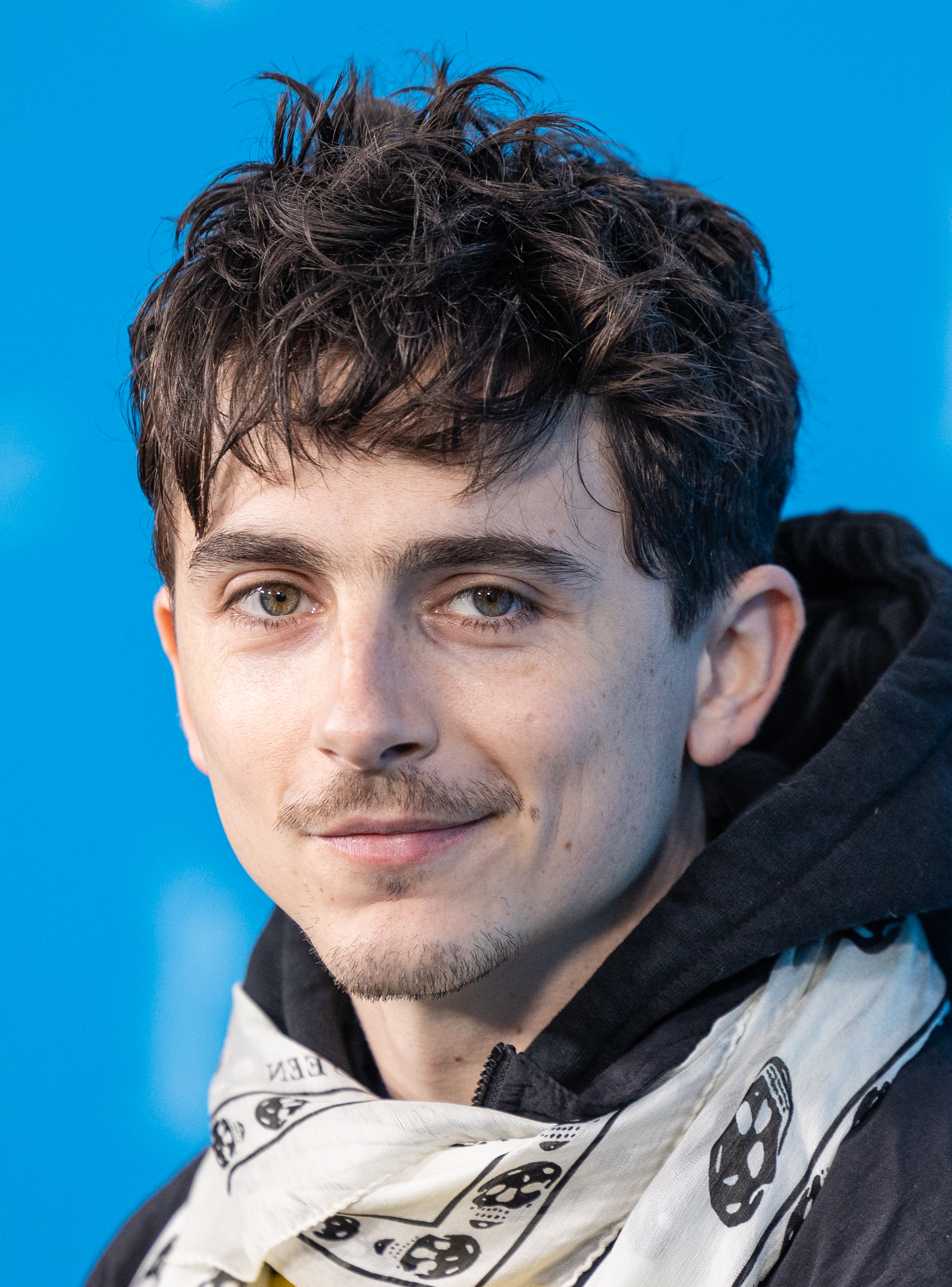
- The 2025 recipients: Michael B. Jordan and Timothée Chalamet
- Awarded for: Best Actor in a Drama Motion Picture; Best Actor in a Comedy or Musical Motion Picture
- Country: United States
- Presented by: Hollywood Creative Alliance
- First award: Gary Oldman; Darkest Hour (2017)
- Currently held by: Drama: Michael B. Jordan - Sinners (2025); Comedy or Musical: Timothée Chalamet - Marty Supreme (2025)
- Website: hollywoodcreative.org

The Astra Film Award for Best Actor - Drama and the Astra Film Award for Best Actor - Comedy or Musical are two of the annual awards given out by the Hollywood Creative Alliance. Prior to 2025, the category was combined into a single category, the Astra Film Award for Best Actor.

== Winners ==
- † = Winner of the Academy Award for Best Actor
- ‡ = Nominated of the Academy Award for Best Actor

=== 2010s ===
Year	Winner and nominees	Film	Role
2017	Gary Oldman †	Darkest Hour	Winston Churchill
2017	Timothée Chalamet ‡	Call Me by Your Name	Elio Perlman
2017	James Franco	The Disaster Artist	Tommy Wiseau
2017	Tom Hanks	The Post	Ben Bradlee
2017	Daniel Kaluuya ‡	Get Out	Chris Washington
2018	Rami Malek †	Bohemian Rhapsody	Freddie Mercury
2018	Christian Bale ‡	Vice	Dick Cheney
2018	Bradley Cooper ‡	A Star is Born	Jackson Maine
2018	Ethan Hawke	First Reformed	Reverend Ernst Toller
2018	Viggo Mortensen ‡	Green Book	Tony Lip
2019	Joaquin Phoenix †	Joker	Arthur Fleck / Joker
2019	Leonardo DiCaprio ‡	Once Upon a Time in Hollywood	Rick Dalton
2019	Adam Driver ‡	Marriage Story	Charlie Barber
2019	Eddie Murphy	Dolemite Is My Name	Rudy Ray Moore
2019	Taron Egerton	Rocketman	Elton John

=== 2020s ===
Year	Category	Winner and nominees	Film	Role
2020		Delroy Lindo	Da 5 Bloods	Paul
2020		Riz Ahmed ‡	Sound of Metal	Ruben Stone
2020		Kingsley Ben-Adir	One Night in Miami...	Malcolm X
2020		Chadwick Boseman ‡	Ma Rainey's Black Bottom	Levee Green
2020		Anthony Hopkins †	The Father	Anthony
2021		Andrew Garfield ‡	tick, tick... BOOM!	Jonathan Larson
2021		Nicolas Cage	Pig	Robin "Rob" Feld
2021		Benedict Cumberbatch ‡	The Power of the Dog	Phil Burbank
2021		Peter Dinklage	Cyrano	Cyrano de Bergerac
2021		Will Smith †	King Richard	Richard Williams
2022		Brendan Fraser †	The Whale	Charlie
2022		Austin Butler ‡	Elvis	Elvis Presley
2022		Tom Cruise	Top Gun: Maverick	Pete "Maverick" Mitchell
2022		Colin Farrell ‡	The Banshees of Inisherin	Pádraic Súilleabháin
2022		Paul Mescal ‡	Aftersun	Calum Paterson
2023		Paul Giamatti ‡	The Holdovers	Paul Hunham
2023		Bradley Cooper ‡	Maestro	Leonard Bernstein
2023		Colman Domingo ‡	Rustin	Bayard Rustin
2023		Barry Keoghan	Saltburn	Oliver Quick
2023		Cillian Murphy †	Oppenheimer	J. Robert Oppenheimer
2023		Jeffrey Wright ‡	American Fiction	Thelonious "Monk" Ellison
2024		Timothée Chalamet ‡	A Complete Unknown	Bob Dylan
2024		Adrien Brody †	The Brutalist	László Tóth
2024		Colman Domingo ‡	Sing Sing	John "Divine G" Whitfield
2024		Jesse Eisenberg	A Real Pain	David Kaplan
2024		Ralph Fiennes ‡	Conclave	Cardinal Thomas Lawrence
2024		Glen Powell	Hit Man	Gary Johnson
2025	Drama	Michael B. Jordan †	Sinners	Elijah "Smoke" Moore / Elias "Stack" Moore
2025	Drama	Joel Edgerton	Train Dreams	Robert Grainier
2025	Drama	Dwayne Johnson	The Smashing Machine	Mark Kerr
2025	Drama	Wagner Moura ‡	The Secret Agent	Armando / Marcelo Alves / Fernando (adult)
2025	Drama	Dylan O'Brien	Twinless	Roman / Rocky
2025	Drama	Jeremy Allen White	Springsteen: Deliver Me From Nowhere	Bruce Springsteen
2025	Comedy or Musical	Timothée Chalamet ‡	Marty Supreme	Marty Mauser
2025	Comedy or Musical	Lee Byung-hun	No Other Choice	Yoo Man-su
2025	Comedy or Musical	George Clooney	Jay Kelly	Jay Kelly
2025	Comedy or Musical	Leonardo DiCaprio ‡	One Battle After Another	Bob Ferguson
2025	Comedy or Musical	Brendan Fraser	Rental Family	Phillip Vandarploeug
2025	Comedy or Musical	Jesse Plemons	Bugonia	Teddy Gatz
