= The Hate U Give (film) =

2018 film by George Tillman, Jr

- Theatrical release poster, paying tribute to the cover of the book it is based on
- Directed by: George Tillman Jr.
- Screenplay by: Audrey Wells
- Based on: The Hate U Give by Angie Thomas
- Produced by: Marty Bowen; Wyck Godfrey; Robert Teitel; George Tillman Jr.
- Starring: Amandla Stenberg; Regina Hall; Russell Hornsby; KJ Apa; Drew Starkey; Sabrina Carpenter; Common; Anthony Mackie
- Cinematography: Mihai Mălaimare Jr.
- Edited by: Craig Hayes; Alex Blatt
- Music by: Dustin O'Halloran
- Production companies: Fox 2000 Pictures; Temple Hill Entertainment; State Street Pictures
- Distributed by: 20th Century Fox
- Release dates: September 7, 2018 (TIFF); October 5, 2018 (United States)
- Running time: 133 minutes
- Country: United States
- Language: English
- Budget: $23 million
- Box office: $34.9 million

The Hate U Give is a 2018 American coming-of-age teen drama film co-produced and directed by George Tillman Jr., and written by Audrey Wells, who died a day before the film's release. Based on the 2017 young adult novel by Angie Thomas, the film stars Amandla Stenberg as a high school student navigating the fallout of her friend's death in a police shooting. The supporting cast includes Drew Starkey, Regina Hall, Russell Hornsby, Lamar Johnson, KJ Apa, Sabrina Carpenter, Common, and Anthony Mackie.

The project was announced in March 2016, and casting took place from August to September 2017. Principal photography began that same September in Atlanta and wrapped in November. Originally, Kian Lawley was cast in Apa's role, but he was fired after footage of him using racial slurs resurfaced. Apa was brought in to reshoot Lawley's scenes in April 2018.

The Hate U Give premiered at the 2018 Toronto International Film Festival on September 7, 2018, and was released in the United States on October 5, by 20th Century Fox. The film received critical acclaim and grossed $34.9 million worldwide on a $23 million budget. Stenberg's performance earned several accolades, including the NAACP Image Award for Outstanding Actress in a Motion Picture and a Critics' Choice Award nomination for Best Young Performer.

== Plot ==
Starr Carter is a 16-year-old African-American girl who lives in the predominantly black neighborhood of Garden Heights and attends a predominantly white private school called Williamson Prep.

After a firearm is discharged at a party Starr is attending, she is driven home by her best friend, Khalil. They are stopped by a police officer for failing to signal at a lane change. The officer in question, Brian MacIntosh Jr., barks orders at Khalil. Khalil disagrees with MacIntosh, who instructs him to exit the car.

While outside the car, MacIntosh retrieves Khalil's driver's license and instructs him to keep his hands on the roof. Instead, Khalil reaches through the driver side window and pulls out a hairbrush. MacIntosh incorrectly assumes he pulled out a gun and shoots Khalil, killing him. When Starr is cuffed and taken into custody, she is able to get MacIntosh's badge number: 115.

While MacIntosh is placed on administrative leave, the killing becomes a national news story and causes a town-wide protest against what is believed to be an example of racial injustice. Starr's identity as the witness is initially kept secret from everyone outside her family; this leaves her friends, Hailey Grant and Maya Yang, and her boyfriend, Chris – who all attend Williamson Prep – unaware of her connection to the killing.

Starr agrees to be interviewed on television and to testify in front of a grand jury. While defending Khalil's character during her interview, in which her identity is hidden, she names the King Lords, the gang that is the true scourge of her neighborhood. The gang retaliates by threatening Starr and her family, forcing them to move in with her Uncle Carlos, her mom's brother, who is a police detective.

Carlos was a father figure to Starr when her father, Maverick, spent three years in prison for a crime he confessed to. Following his release, Maverick left the gang and became the owner of the Garden Heights grocery store where Starr and her half-brother Seven work. Maverick was only allowed to leave the King Lords because his false confession to the crime kept gang leader King from being locked up. King, who is widely feared, now lives with Seven's mother Iesha, as well as Seven's half-sister Kenya, who is friends with Starr, and Kenya's younger sister Lyric.

After a grand jury does not indict MacIntosh, Garden Heights erupts into both peaceful protests and warlike riots. In reaction to the decision, Starr takes an increasingly public role, including speaking out during the protests. Her increasing identification with the people of Garden Heights causes tension with her school friends, especially between her and Chris. Starr and Maya start standing up to Hailey's racist comments, breaking up their friendship, while Chris remains supportive of Starr.

Starr and Seven get trapped in Maverick's grocery store, which is fire-bombed by King and his gang. The two escape with the help of Maverick and other Garden Heights business owners. The community stands up against King, who goes to jail. Starr promises to keep Khalil's memory alive and to continue her advocacy against police violence by "any means necessary".

== Cast ==
- Amandla Stenberg as Starr Carter
- Regina Hall as Lisa Carter, Starr and Sekani's mother and Maverick's wife
- Russell Hornsby as Maverick Carter, Starr, Sekani and Seven's father
- Algee Smith as Khalil Harris, Starr's childhood best friend who is unlawfully killed by Officer MacIntosh
- Lamar Johnson as Seven Carter, Starr, Sekani, Kenya and Lyric's older half-brother
- Issa Rae as April Ofrah, a lawyer
- KJ Apa as Chris Bryant, Starr's boyfriend
- Common as Carlos, Lisa's brother and uncle to Starr & Sekani
- Anthony Mackie as King, Iesha's husband, father to Kenya and Lyric, stepfather to Seven
- Dominique Fishback as Kenya, Starr's best friend and one of three half-sisters to Seven
- Sabrina Carpenter as Hailey Grant, one of Starr's school friends
- Megan Lawless as Maya Yang, one of Starr's school friends
- TJ Wright as Sekani Carter, Starr's younger brother and Seven's half-brother
- Drew Starkey as Brian MacIntosh Jr., also known as Officer 115, the police officer who killed Khalil and arrested Starr
- Joe Hardy Jr. as Brian MacIntosh Sr., Officer Brian MacIntosh Jr.'s father, seen on the news trying to defend his son

== Production ==
=== Development ===
On March 23, 2016, it was announced that Amandla Stenberg would star as Starr Carter in the film, based on the novel The Hate U Give by Angie Thomas. George Tillman Jr. would direct, from a screenplay by Audrey Wells, while producers would be Marty Bowen and Wyck Godfrey through State Street Pictures and Temple Hill Entertainment. On August 1, 2017, Russell Hornsby and Lamar Johnson were cast in the film to play Maverick Carter, Starr's father, and Seven Carter, Starr's brother, respectively. On August 3, Regina Hall was added as Lisa Carter, Starr's mother, and on August 15, Algee Smith also joined, to play Khalil, Starr's childhood best friend. On August 22, it was reported that Common had been cast as Starr's uncle, a police officer.

On August 23, 2017, Issa Rae was cast in the film to play April, the social activist who encourages Starr to speak out publicly. On August 24, Sabrina Carpenter was added as well, playing Hailey, one of Starr's high school friends. On September 12, Anthony Mackie and Kian Lawley joined the film to play the local drug dealer King, and Starr's boyfriend, Chris, respectively until on February 5, 2018, it was announced that Lawley had been fired from the film due to a resurfaced video showing Lawley using racially offensive slurs, resulting in his role being recast and his scenes reshot. On April 3, 2018, it was announced that KJ Apa would replace Lawley.

=== Filming ===
Principal photography on the film began on September 12, 2017, in Atlanta, Georgia. and wrapped on November 4, 2017. Reshoots were shot along with KJ Apa's scenes in April 2018.

== Release ==
The Hate U Give began a limited release in the United States on October 5, 2018, before a scheduled expansion the following week, and then a wide release on October 19, the day it opened worldwide. It was previously scheduled to go directly into wide release on the 19th.

The day prior to the film's release, screenwriter Audrey Wells died from cancer at the age of 58. 20th Century Fox released a statement saying, "We are simply heartbroken. Audrey's was a voice of empowerment and courage, and her words will live on through the strong, determined female characters she brought to life. Our thoughts are with Brian, Tatiana, and all of Audrey's family and friends at this difficult time."

=== Home media ===
The Hate U Give was released on digital download on January 8, 2019, and on DVD/Blu-Ray on January 22, 2019.

== Reception ==
=== Box office ===
The Hate U Give grossed $29.7 million in the United States and Canada, and $5.2 million in other territories, for a total worldwide gross of $34.9 million. When Disney acquired Fox, The Hollywood Reporter stated that the film had lost Fox a total of $30–40 million due to its $23 million production budget and $30 million spent on marketing.

In its limited opening weekend, The Hate U Give made $512,035 from 36 theaters, for an average of $14,233 per venue, finishing 13th. Playing in a total of 248 theaters the following weekend, the film made $1.8 million, finishing ninth. The film was projected to gross $7–9 million when it expanded to 2,303 theaters on October 19. It made $2.5 million on its first day of wide release, including $300,000 from Thursday night previews. It went on to gross $7.5 million over the weekend, finishing sixth at the box office. It fell 33% to $5.1 million the following weekend, remaining in sixth.

=== Critical response ===
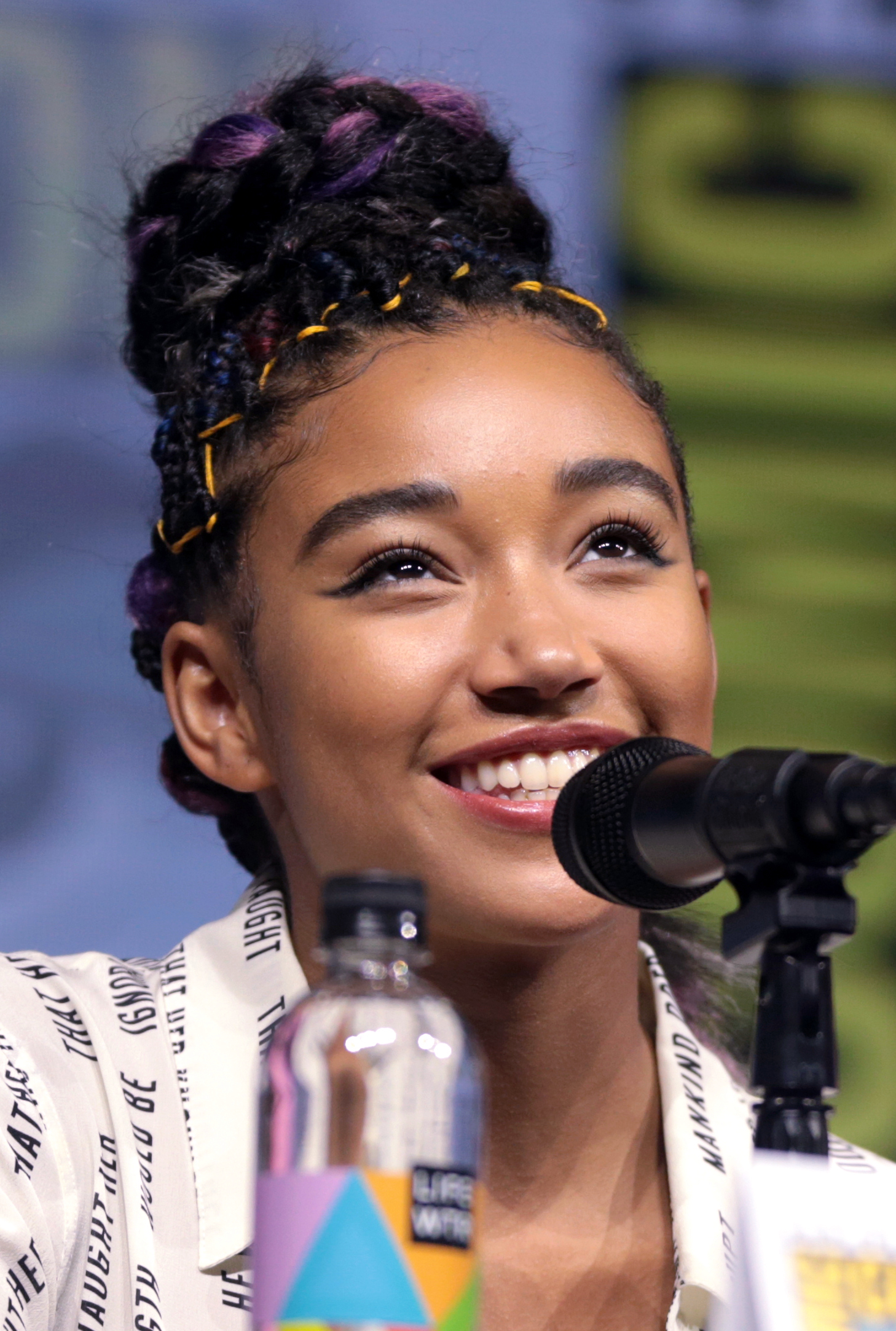
Stenberg's performance was praised by critics, and she received several accolades for the role.

On review aggregator Rotten Tomatoes, the film holds an approval rating of 97% based on 225 reviews, and an average rating of 8.1/10. The website's critical consensus reads, "Led by a breakout turn from Amandla Stenberg, the hard-hitting The Hate U Give emphatically proves the YA genre has room for much more than magic and romance." On Metacritic, the film has a weighted average score of 81 out of 100, based on 44 critics, indicating "universal acclaim". Audiences polled by CinemaScore gave the film a rare average grade of "A+" on an A+ to F scale, while PostTrak reported filmgoers gave it an 88% positive score and a 74% "definite recommend".

Writing for Rolling Stone, Peter Travers gave the film four out of five stars, calling it an "exceptional adaptation", and writing, "It is impossible to over-praise Stenberg's incandescent performance, a gathering storm that grows in ferocity and feeling with each scene. Stenberg nails every nuance of a role that keeps throwing challenges at her, none more devastating than when it becomes impossible for Starr to remain stuck in neutral." Scott Mendelson, writing for Forbes, stated that the film deserved to be an Academy Awards frontrunner for its screenplay, Stenberg and Russell Hornsby's performances, and the picture itself, saying it "belongs among the final list of would-be Best Picture nominees."

Keith Watson of Slant Magazine, however, gave the film two out of four stars, writing, "Given its intensely relevant subject matter, the film can't help but churn up a lot of raw emotions—and the allusions to Michael Brown, Sandra Bland, and Emmett Till are reminders of the real-life sorrow that birthed this film—but Tillman's anonymous direction is content merely to illustrate the screenplay without ever bringing it to life. Even scenes that are meant to be tinged with menace and danger—run-ins with a local gang, a shooting at a party—feel about as raw as an episode of Degrassi". The film was also criticized by some female African-American critics as well, including Soraya Nadia McDonald of Andscape, who said that "In dealing with all of it, the book character finds her confidence and her voice. But the movie version of The Hate U Give leaves me unsure that its makers ever found theirs."

=== Accolades ===
Award	Date of ceremony	Category	Recipient(s)	Result	Ref.
African-American Film Critics Association	December 18, 2018	Top Ten Films	The Hate U Give	3rd place	
African-American Film Critics Association	December 18, 2018	Best Supporting Actor	Russell Hornsby	Won	
African-American Film Critics Association	December 18, 2018	Best Breakout Performance	Amandla Stenberg	Won	
Alliance of Women Film Journalists	January 10, 2019	Best Screenplay, Adapted	Audrey Wells	Nominated	
Alliance of Women Film Journalists	January 10, 2019	Best Woman Screenwriter	Audrey Wells	Nominated	
BET Awards	June 23, 2019	Best Movie	The Hate U Give	Nominated	
Black Reel Awards	February 7, 2019	Best Actress	Amandla Stenberg	Nominated	
Black Reel Awards	February 7, 2019	Best Supporting Actor	Russell Hornsby	Nominated	
Black Reel Awards	February 7, 2019	Best Original or Adapted Song	"We Won't Move" by Arlissa	Nominated	
Black Reel Awards	February 7, 2019	Best Original Score	Dustin O'Halloran	Nominated	
Casting Society of America	January 31, 2019	Outstanding Achievement in Casting – Big Budget Feature - Drama	Yesi Ramirez, Tara Feldstein, Chase Paris	Nominated	
Critics Choice Movie Awards	January 13, 2019	Best Young Performer	Amandla Stenberg	Nominated	
Georgia Film Critics Association	January 12, 2019	Oglethorpe Award for Excellence in Georgia Cinema	George Tillman Jr., Audrey Wells	Nominated	
Guild of Music Supervisors Awards	February 13, 2019	Best Music Supervision for Films Budgeted Under $25 Million Dollars	Season Kent	Nominated	
Hamptons International Film Festival	October 8, 2018	Audience Award for Best Narrative Feature	George Tillman Jr.	Won	
Hamptons International Film Festival	October 8, 2018	Breakthrough Artist	Amandla Stenberg	Won	
Hollywood Film Awards	November 4, 2018	Breakout Actress	Amandla Stenberg	Won	
Hollywood Music in Media Awards	November 15, 2018	Best Original Song - Feature Film	"We Won't Move" by Arlissa	Nominated	
Los Angeles Online Film Critics Society	December 7, 2018	Best Picture	The Hate U Give	Won	
Los Angeles Online Film Critics Society	December 7, 2018	Best Supporting Actor	Russell Hornsby	Won	
Los Angeles Online Film Critics Society	December 7, 2018	Best Performance by and Actress 23 or Under	Amandla Stenberg	Nominated	
Los Angeles Online Film Critics Society	December 7, 2018	Best Breakthrough Performance	Amandla Stenberg	Won	
Los Angeles Online Film Critics Society	December 7, 2018	Best Adapted Screenplay	Audrey Wells	Won	
Mill Valley Film Festival	October 15, 2018	Spotlight Award	Amandla Stenberg	Won	
MTV Movie & TV Awards	June 15, 2019	Best Performance in a Movie	Amandla Stenberg	Nominated	
NAACP Image Awards	March 30, 2019	Outstanding Motion Picture	The Hate U Give	Nominated	
NAACP Image Awards	March 30, 2019	Outstanding Actress	Amandla Stenberg	Won	
NAACP Image Awards	March 30, 2019	Outstanding Supporting Actor	Russell Hornsby	Nominated	
NAACP Image Awards	March 30, 2019	Outstanding Supporting Actress	Regina Hall	Nominated	
NAACP Image Awards	March 30, 2019	Outstanding Ensemble Cast	The Cast of The Hate U Give	Nominated	
San Francisco Bay Area Film Critics Circle	December 9, 2018	Best Supporting Actor	Russell Hornsby	Nominated	
Seattle Film Critics Society	December 17, 2018	Best Supporting Actor	Russell Hornsby	Nominated	
St. Louis Film Critics Association	December 16, 2018	Best Soundtrack	The Hate U Give	Nominated	
Teen Choice Awards	August 11, 2019	Choice Movie - Drama	The Hate U Give	Nominated	
Teen Choice Awards	August 11, 2019	Choice Drama Movie Actress	Amandla Stenberg	Nominated	
Washington D.C. Area Film Critics Association	December 3, 2018	Best Breakthrough Performance	Amandla Stenberg	Nominated	
Women Film Critics Circle	December 11, 2018	Best Woman Storyteller	Audrey Wells	Won	
Women Film Critics Circle	December 11, 2018	Best Young Actress	Amandla Stenberg	Nominated	
Women Film Critics Circle	December 11, 2018	Best Family Film	The Hate U Give	Nominated	
Women Film Critics Circle	December 11, 2018	Josephine Baker Award	The Hate U Give	Nominated	

== See also ==
- List of black films of the 2010s
- List of hood films
- Police brutality in the United States
