= Good Girl =

Good Girl(s) may refer to:

== Books, comics, and art ==
- The Good Girls: An Ordinary Killing, a 2021 narrative non-fiction book by Sonia Faleiro
- Good Girls: A Story and Study of Anorexia, a 2023 memoir by Hadley Freeman
- Good Girls (comics), a 1987–1991 comic book limited series
- Good Girl (comics), a 2017 comic book volume for I Hate Fairyland from Image Comics
- Good Girl (novel), a 2025 novel by Aria Aber
- Good girl art, illustrations with a strong emphasis on attractive females

== Film and television ==
=== Films ===
- The Good Girl, a 2002 American comedy-drama film
- The Good Girl (2004 film), a Spanish pornographic short film
- Good Girl (film), a 2005 French comedy film
- The Good Girls (film), a 2018 Mexican drama film
- Les Bonnes Femmes (lit. The Good Girls), a 1960 French film by Claude Chabrol

=== Television ===
- Good Girl (TV program), a 2020 Korean music competition program
- Good Girls (TV series), a 2018–2021 American crime comedy-drama series
- "Good Girl" (Law & Order), a 1996 TV episode
- "The Good Girl" (Law & Order: Special Victims Unit), a 2019 TV episode

== Music ==
- The Good Girls (group), an American R&B trio

=== Albums ===
- Good Girl (Jill Johnson album) or the title song, 2002
- Good Girl (Sherman Chung album), 2007

=== Songs ===
- "Good Girl" (Alexis Jordan song), 2011
- "Good Girl" (Carrie Underwood song), 2012
- "Good Girl" (Cloonee and Prospa song, 2026
- "Good Girl" (Dustin Lynch song), 2018
- "Good Girl", by Charlotte Cardin from Phoenix, 2021
- "Good Girl", by Chrisette Michele from I Am, 2007
- "Good Girl", by Hyuna from I'm Not Cool, 2021
- "Good Girl", by K.Flay from Inside Voices / Outside Voices, 2022
- "Good Girl", by Paenda, 2021
- "Good Girls" (5 Seconds of Summer song), 2014
- "Good Girls" (Elle King song), 2016
- "Good Girls" (Joe song), 1997
- "Good Girls", by Carl Craig from DJ-Kicks: Carl Craig, 1996
- "Good Girls", by Charli XCX, unreleased
- "Good Girls", by Chvrches from Screen Violence, 2021
- "Good Girls", by Crystal Fighters from Everything Is My Family, 2016
- "Good Girls", by Ian Hunter from Dirty Laundry, 1995
- "Good Girls", by John Mellencamp from Chestnut Street Incident, 1976
- "Good Girls", by LANY from LANY, 2017
- "Good Girls", by Nick Jonas from Last Year Was Complicated, 2016
- "Good Girls", by Obie Trice from The Hangover, 2015
- "Good Girls", by the Ronettes, 1962
- "Good Girls", by Tim McGraw from Southern Voice, 2009
- "Good Girl", by Aquilo, 2015

== Others ==
- Good Girl, a fragrance released by the fashion house Carolina Herrera

== See also ==
- Very Good Girls, a 2013 drama film
- Good Little Girls, a 1971 French film
- "Good Little Girls" (song), a 2003 song by Blue County
- Good Girl Gone Bad (disambiguation)
- Good Girls Don't (disambiguation)
- Good (disambiguation)
- Girl (disambiguation)
