= Good Dog (disambiguation) =

Good Dog is a Canadian television series.

The Good Dog is a 2001 novel by Avi.

Good Dog, The Good Dog, A Good Dog, or good dog may also refer to:

== Literature ==
- "Good Dog", a 1954 short story by Jerome Bixby
- Good Dog: True Stories of Love, Loss, and Loyalty, a 2014 book by Donovan Webster
- Good Dog, a 2020 book by Randal Ford
- Good Dog, a 2020 children's book by Sean Taylor
- "Good Dog", a chapter of 1-nichi Gaishutsuroku Hanchō published in Volume 8 in 2020
- A Good Dog: The Story of Orson Who Changed My Life, a 2006 book by Jon Katz
- The Good Dog, a 2015 children's book by Todd Kessler

== Television ==
- "Good Dog", a 1979 episode of What-a-Mess
- "Good Dog", a 2016 episode of Peanuts
- Good Dog, a television series featuring Stanley Coren

== Other ==
- Aspects of the human–canine bond
- Good Dog, a magazine published by Summit Media from 2011 to 2013
- Good Dog, a brand of pet treats made by Wellness Pet Company
- Good Dog Distribution, a production company founded by Nelson Woss
- The Good Dog! International Film Festival, an Australian film festival
- Good Dog Island on Burntside Lake in Ely, Minnesota, United States

== See also ==
- Good Boy (disambiguation)
- Good Girl (disambiguation)
- Good God (disambiguation)
