= Decision (fragrance) =

Fragrance by Amouage

Fragrance by Amouage
- Released: 2025
- Label: Amouage
- Perfumer(s): Quentin Bisch (Givaudan)
- Concentration: Eau de parfum
- Flanker(s): Decision 42 (2026)
- Awards: Fragrance Foundation France Annual Revelations, Best Niche Perfume – Iconic Independent Brands (2026)

Decision is a fragrance released by the Omani perfume house Amouage in 2025, composed by the perfumer Quentin Bisch of Givaudan. It won the prize for best niche perfume in the iconic independent brands category at the Fragrance Foundation France Annual Revelations in 2026.

== Concept ==
Renaud Salmon, Amouage's chief creative officer, said the eau de parfum "presented the story of a juniper tree struck by lightning, and then asked a seemingly simple question: would the tree survive the attack or would it perish?"

== Decision 42 ==
In September 2026 Amouage released Decision 42, an extrait de parfum reworking of the original, again composed by Bisch. The figure in the name denotes its oil concentration of 42 per cent, a disclosure the house makes for all of its extraits; the industry more commonly uses terms such as "élixir" or "absolu" without stating a percentage. The extrait was aged for six weeks and priced at $550 for 100 ml, going on sale at Amouage boutiques and on the company's website before reaching distributors worldwide on 1 October.

Women's Wear Daily reported that the extrait sharpened the original with neroli, cardamom and cinnamon, and darkened its juniper with Javanol, patchouli and rectified pine tar.

Amouage has numbered its extraits by concentration since 2021, when it introduced reworked versions of Interlude, Honour, Epic and Reflection; the figures range from 40 to 56 per cent, against the 15 to 20 per cent that has historically defined the format. The house waits at least a year after an eau de parfum is released before developing an extrait, and evaluates formulas in five-point increments between 30 and 60 per cent.

Salmon has cautioned against reading the numbers as a measure of quality, saying it is "a mistake to think that 'the more concentrated it is, the better'".
