= Lazulio =

Fragrance by Diptyque

Fragrance by Diptyque
- Released: September 2025
- Label: Diptyque
- Perfumer(s): Quentin Bisch (Givaudan)
- Concentration: Eau de parfum
- Awards: Fragrance Foundation France Annual Revelations, Best Niche Perfume – Group-Owned Brands (2026)

Lazulio is a fragrance released by the French house Diptyque in September 2025, composed by the perfumer Quentin Bisch of Givaudan. It won the prize for best niche perfume in the group-owned brands category at the Fragrance Foundation France Annual Revelations in 2026.

== Composition and concept ==
Lazulio is built on rhubarb, benzoin from Laos, Haitian vetiver and rose. Bisch described the intention as "a dual sensation: the initial burst of rhubarb, full of light and sharp green energy, followed by the soft warmth of benzoin".

The fragrance belongs to Diptyque's Les Essences collection, whose releases take as their starting point natural objects that have no scent of their own, among them coral, mother-of-pearl, bark and desert rose. Lazulio's subject is the peacock feather, and its name refers to the blue of lapis lazuli. The bottle carries a watercolour by the illustrator Nigel Peake that draws on a peacock drawing by Desmond Knox-Leet, one of Diptyque's founders.

== Reception ==
Reviewing the fragrance for Who What Wear, Maya Thomas called it the best of the Les Essences collection and "beautiful and unique", describing an opening of rhubarb giving way to vetiver and benzoin and a soft, woody drydown.
