= Indy (dog) =

American dog actor (born circa 2017)

- Species: Canis familiaris
- Breed: Nova Scotia Duck Tolling Retriever
- Sex: Male
- Occupation: Dog actor
- Years active: 2025–present
- Owners: Ben Leonberg, Kari Fischer
- Named after: Indiana Jones

Indy (born c. 2017) is a Nova Scotia Duck Tolling Retriever dog actor best known for his role in the 2025 horror film Good Boy. The film role earned Indy the prize for Best Performance in a Horror or Thriller at the 9th Astra Film Awards, the first time an animal was recognized in a category that had previously been reserved for human talent.

== Life and career ==
Indy is owned by Ben Leonberg and Kari Fischer, with Leonberg first receiving Indy in 2017. Leonberg named him after the Indiana Jones film series.

Indy made his debut playing a fictionalized version of himself in the 2025 film Good Boy, written by Leonberg and produced by Fischer. Indy had no formal acting training prior to the film, and Leonberg originally did not picture Indy as the lead while writing. However, he described Indy as having an "intense, unblinking stare" and expressive movements that he thought would make him a good fit for the role. Leonberg conceived the idea for a supernatural horror film framed from a dog's perspective after re-watching the 1982 film Poltergeist. Leonberg also cited the 1980 film The Shining as an influence for Good Boy, noting that both films question whether the characters' seemingly supernatural experiences are genuine or products of their psychological state, and feature endings open to interpretation. A stuffed replica of Indy, which Leonberg nicknamed 'Findy', was used as a stand-in for Indy when setting up various shots of the film and performing stunts.

As a lead, Indy's performance received an abundance of positive reviews from critics. Rendy Jones of Den of Geek likened Indy's performance to the title character of the animated comedy horror series Courage the Cowardly Dog. Nominated for Best Performance in a Horror or Thriller for his performance at the 9th Astra Film Awards, Indy made film awards history as he is now the first canine to be nominated for a major film acting category that had previously recognized only human talent. Indy ultimately won the award; though not in attendance, Leonberg accepted the award via an acceptance speech video, with Indy by his side, which was published on the Astra Awards YouTube channel the following day.

== Filmography ==
Year	Title	Role	Director	Notes
2025	Good Boy	Himself	Ben Leonberg	Indy's film debut

== Awards and nominations ==
Award	Date of ceremony	Category	Result	Ref.
Astra Film Awards	January 9, 2026	Best Performance in a Horror or Thriller	Won	
Austin Film Critics Association	December 18, 2025	Special Award (Note: For a uniquely realized performance in the field of animal acting.)	Won	
Boston Society of Film Critics	December 14, 2025	Best in Show (Best Animal Performance)	Won	
Critics' Choice Super Awards	August 6, 2026	Best Good Boy in a Horror Movie	Honored	
San Diego Film Critics Society	December 15, 2025	Special Award: Best Animal Performance	Won	
Seattle Film Critics Society	December 15, 2025	Special Citation (Note: For achievements in animal acting.)	Won	
South by Southwest Film & TV Festival	March 12, 2025	Howl of Fame Award (Best Canine Performance)	Won	
