= 2014 Badaun gang rape allegations =

Alleged gang rape and murder

- Date: 27 May 2014
- Location: Katra Shahadatganj, Badaun, Uttar Pradesh, India
- Participants: Local villagers
- Deaths: Two girls
- Suspects: Up to seven
- Accused: Pappu Yadav, Awadhesh Yadav and Urvesh Yadav (brothers), initially accused of rape and murder; Chhatrapal Yadav and Sarvesh Yadav (police constables), were initially accused, however CBI refused to press charges
- Charges: alleged Gang rape and murder

On 27 May 2014, a gang rape and murder of two teenage girls was reported in the Katra village of Budaun district (also spelled as Badayun), Uttar Pradesh, India. It was widely reported in the press in India as well as overseas. After an extensive investigation, CBI concluded that there was no gang rape and the suspects were released. However, on 28 October 2015 the POCSO court rejected the CBI closure report; it was a major setback for CBI. According to reports, in the evening the girls had gone out into a field that was used for open defecation and did not return. The police were notified, but initially took no action. Villagers searched for the girls throughout the night and their bodies were found hanging from a tree the following morning.

According to a post-mortem examination conducted earlier, it was reported that the girls had been raped and died from strangulation due to being hanged while still alive. However, according to a CBI investigation, no evidence of rape was found, and the initial examination, conducted by a physician who had never conducted rape investigations before, was flawed. The girl's family and several activists rejected the CBI report as a cover-up "to avoid international shame and acceptance of the dismal law and order situation".

The girls' family and others have charged that the local police attempted a cover-up of the incident due to the lower status of the family. Some of the earliest reports claimed that the family belong to a "Dalit" caste. Later reports contradicted the report of the victims belonging to the Dalit community. On 6 June 2014, the Indian government began a review of the case and determined that because "a concerted effort of a blame game has taken shape by the officials manning the administration" investigating the case, "it is necessary for the court to monitor the investigation".

The case has gained both national and international attention. In a statement, the humanitarian organisation Save the Children India called the attack "part of an alarming trend of brutal violence against those from marginalised communities". The CBI announced in on 27 November 2014 that they have concluded that the two cousins were not sexually assaulted and murdered as police initially said, but took their own lives. Through the use of phone records it was established that the older girl was, in fact, having an affair with 20-year-old Pappu Yadav, with whom she had shared about 400 calls.

== Incident as initially reported ==
The two teenage girls were cousins. They went missing on the evening of 26 May 2014, when they went out of their home and were alleged to have been abducted. It was alleged that the girls had gone into the fields because there was no toilet in their home.

The parents of the girls immediately reported that the girls were missing, but allegedly their First Information Report was not lodged by the officers. According to some reports, Sohan Lal, father of one and uncle of the other victim, said that he went to the police station at around midnight begging for help in finding the girls, but that the two police officers on duty "mocked him, ripped up his complaint and told him to come back in the morning". Reports of the incident differ. Some reports said that a family relative had seen the abduction and reported the incident to the father of one of the girls. One news source stated that the father said that the family went to the accused's home and the accused admitted to abducting the girls but refused to release them. The father said that a policeman was present in the home at that time.

Several hours later the girls' bodies were found hanging from a tree about one kilometre (0.6-mile) from their home. A large number of villagers had gathered at the site to prevent the police from removing the bodies for fear that the police would say that the girls had killed themselves. The families of the victims have asserted that the police are shielding the attackers.

== Investigation and initial arrests ==
On 29 May 2014, Badaun's Superintendent of Police Man Singh Chouhan said that a post-mortem had found that the girls were raped and died from hanging, and that DNA samples had been taken to help identify the perpetrators. On 1 June, it was reported that three men, Pappu Yadav, Awdesh Yadav, and Urvesh Yadav, had been arrested and that they had confessed to the rape and murder of the girls, while the police continued to search for two additional suspects. Two police officers, Chhatrapal Yadav and Sarvesh Yadav, were charged with criminal conspiracy and discharged over the incident. However Pushpa Lata Pant, the doctor who did the post-mortem acknowledged that she had never done a post-mortem before, but did it because she was ordered. It was done at night, which is generally not permitted.

On 8 June, Uttar Pradesh Director General of Police A. L. Banerjee said, "According to the postmortem report of the deceased, one of the girls was not raped and it appears to be a case of honour killing. We are probing the matter". Speaking to the press on that date, state chief secretary Alok Ranjan stated, "Rape is a trivial incident and it should not be blown out of proportion by the media. The media should also look into the incidents where people have been falsely implicated in such cases." Speaking to the press on 12 June, Banerjee said that the girls were strangulated before death, and that there is a possibility that the accused could be innocent. According to Banerjee, the death of one of the girls may be related to property inheritance issues within the family: "Of the two victims, one was the lone child of her parents. Her father is one of three brothers with limited resources and if she was not alive, it could benefit others". The father of one of the girls responded saying, "We always knew the police was biased... They are trying to frame our family to save the accused who are all Yadavs. We will leave the village and go to Delhi to fight for justice".

== Gang rape allegations found false by CBI investigation ==
On 6 June, a Special Investigation Team (SIT) was set up by the government to probe the incident. The team visited the village and met with witnesses.

On 12 June, the Central Bureau of Investigation (CBI) began an investigation and registered a First information report of the case.

On 8 July, a second autopsy of the girls bodies was ordered by the CBI. On 15 July, several news sources reported that the CBI is investigating "alleged inconsistencies" in the statements made by the families of the girls. Reportedly the CBI has recovered the slippers of the older girl which "are being seen as crucial evidence in the investigation into their death". According to the reports, "the family had allegedly withheld information on the whereabouts of a cellphone belonging to the older girl and about 20 days ago, gave it to the CBI in broken condition".

The CBI has administered polygraph tests to both family members and the accused. The polygraph tests determined that the five accused had been telling the truth. However the chief witness Nazru alias Babburam failed the polygraph test.

On 17 July, the CBI confirmed that it would exhume the bodies of the two victims on the 20th, subject to receiving the required approval from a court, based on a recommendation from the medical board of the All India Institute of Medical Sciences (AIIMS) to conduct another post mortem examination and continue with further investigation. However, on 20 July it was reported that the rising levels of water in the Ganges had flooded the graves resulting in the bodies not being found, thus making exhumation impossible. The CBI will instead use a DNA analysis of the girls' personal belongings and of the vaginal swabs taken at the time of their death.

The alleged rape and murder case become murky when the families of the two victims told the CBI that the police FIR was filed on the basis of wrong statements given by Nazru, an uncle of the girls. Eventually, the family as well as Nazru told the CBI that the main accused Pappu, had not taken the two girls at gunpoint but rather fled when he was seen with the girls by Nazru.

It was found that the parents gave Rs 100,000 each to the main eyewitness, Najru, and their third brother, from the Rs 500,000 that they had received as compensation for tragedy from the Bahujan Samaj Party.

The mobile phone used by the sisters, was noticed by the CBI investigators from a photograph of the crime scene, seen tucked in the upper garments of the elder sister. A month later, the CBI had asked the family to produce the phone. The family first claimed that the phone has been lost and later provided a damaged mobile phone. The phone was then sent to Gujarat FSL which concluded, "the mobile phone was broken recently and intentionally by applying external force." CBI found that the older girl and the main suspect of the alleged rape/murder had made contact by mobile phone around 300 times since 2013.

On 26 August, a CBI spokesperson announced that they would not be filing a chargesheet against the five accused because forensic tests had ruled out sexual assault. The CBI did not rule out murder saying: "However, we have not a given clean chit to anyone. Though rape has been ruled out, murder has not. We are investigating the matter." The father of one of the girls protested the ruling saying that one of the accused had publicly confessed at the time of the incident, that the delay of a second autopsy was postponed till it was impossible due to a rise in the river, and that he had no proof that the clothing used for DNA testing was even that of the girls.

The CBI announced in a news conference on 27 November 2014 that after a five-month probe they have concluded that the two cousins were not sexually assaulted and murdered as police initially said, but took their own lives. According to their investigation, through the use of phone records it was established that the older girl was, in fact, having an affair with 20-year-old Pappy Yadav, with whom she had shared about 400 calls.

In December 2015, the POCSO court of Badaun, in a written verdict of 25 pages, rejected CBI's closure report. Additional district judge Virendra Kumar Pandey dismissed the CBI's closure report. He further summoned for the prime accused Pappu.

The CBI report has been questioned by some local villagers and All India Democratic Women's Association, affiliated with Communist Party of India (Marxist). The Aam Admi Party has claimed that it is a cover-up "to avoid international shame and acceptance of the dismal law and order situation".

== Protests and reactions after initial reports ==
In a statement in response to a PIL filed by an Allahabad NGO, the Allahabad High Court said:

We find that the law and order situation in the state of Uttar Pradesh has deteriorated. In the past couple of months, crimes against women have increased and this incident, unfortunately, has engaged the attention of the world at large ... The administration has taken a back seat and, instead of maintaining the rule of law, a concerted effort of a blame game has taken shape by the officials manning the administration. What would be the shape of the investigation is not known. What is the state of affairs of crimes against women in UP is required to be indicated. The court is conscious of the exercise of its powers and considering the present situation, it is necessary for the court to monitor the investigation.

On 1 June, hundreds of protesters, mostly women, gathered outside the office of Chief Minister Akhilesh Yadav in Lucknow. The protesters demanded that action be taken to combat the rise in the number of rapes and other violent attacks on women and girls, and protested about the indifference of the police, which they believe encourages attacks on them. Activists and others said it appears that nothing has changed since the December 2012 fatal gang rape of a 23-year-old woman in New Delhi. Police dispersed the crowd with water cannons.

On 11 June, it was reported that a group of women in Ernakulam, Kerala, protested the rape by appearing in public with their shoulders and legs bared. The women had wrapped themselves in tri-colour banners to represent the Indian national flag, with anti-rape messages printed on them. A spokesperson for the group said: "We used our bodies to protest against people who are using women's bodies as a political weapon. Without hearing our voices of protests and slogans, without understanding the apolitical climate which is permeating in the society, people are more worried about our bare shoulders and legs. To those people who still think female bodies are the reason for rape, we mock all those people, in the name of those girls who were raped and lynched in Uttar Pradesh." Police arrested the women and charged them with indecent exposure.

=== Reactions ===
Chief Minister of Uttar Pradesh, Akhilesh Yadav, drew widespread criticism when he replied to a journalist's question about a sharp rise in rape cases when he replied saying: "It's not as if you faced any danger." Following the rape and murder of the girls a recent comment made by former Chief Minister of Uttar Pradesh Mulayam Singh Yadav, has also been frequently mentioned in the press. At an election rally Yadav had stated that he opposed the death penalty for rapists saying, "Boys will be boys. They make mistakes".

On 2 June, the United Nations issued a statement condemning the gang-rape and murders saying: "There should be justice for families of the two teenage girls ... Violence against women is a human rights issue, not a women's issue. Violence against women is preventable, not inevitable ... The Badaun incident highlights the dangers women in India are exposed to due to lack of toilets". In a statement, Lise Grande, the UN's resident coordinator for India, said, "There should be justice for the families of the two teenage girls and for all the women and girls from lower-caste communities who are targeted and raped in rural India".

On 4 June, UN Secretary-General Ban Ki-moon condemned the rape case and spoke against the violence against women that is spreading across the world. He also condemned the destructive attitude of "boys will be boys".

The All India Democratic Women's Association condemned the incident and demanded speedy investigation into the crime as well as action against erring police personnel.

Shireen Vakil Miller, of Save the Children India, called the attack "part of an alarming trend of brutal violence against those from marginalised communities". The Chief and members of SUM, an NGO, held agitations against this brutal violence in Delhi, adding pressure on Government by their efforts.

== Caste issues ==
While some early reports in Hindi and a New York Times article did not identify the victims to be from the Dalit caste, they were erroneously identified as being Dalit in a Reuters report by Nita Bhalla on 29 May. It was later widely reported that they were not Dalit but were of the Maurya caste, which in fact has same status as Yadav caste. The central government asked the Uttar Pradesh state government why the stringent clauses of the Scheduled Caste and Scheduled Tribe (Prevention of Atrocities) Act, 1989 (SC/ST) were not applied when the accused were charged with raping and murdering the two girls in Badaun. The state government responded that per the report received from the Badaun district administration, the victims did not belong to SC/ST; they were from the Other Backward Class (OBC) community.

Several reports acknowledge that the victims belonged to the community generally known as Shakya (also termed Maurya), while the suspects, as well as the local police officers, belong to the Yadav community. Both castes are classified as OBC in Uttar Pradesh.

While the Yadavas are numerically stronger, the Shakyas also have a significant population. It was reported that this may lead to some political implications.

== In popular culture ==
The 2019 Hindi-language film Article 15, directed by Anubhav Sinha, was inspired by the case. In 2021, journalist Sonia Faleiro published a narrative non-fiction book on the case titled The Good Girls: An Ordinary Killing.

== See also ==
- Rape in India
- Pararia mass rape (1988)
