= San Diego Film Critics Society Awards 2025 =

30th San Diego Film Critics Society Awards

30th San Diego Film Critics Society Awards
- Date: December 15, 2025
- Site: San Diego, California, U.S.

Highlights
- Best Picture: Sinners
- Most awards: Sinners
- Most nominations: Sinners (12)

The 30th San Diego Film Critics Society Awards were announced on December 15, 2025.

The nominations were announced on December 12, 2025. Ryan Coogler's period supernatural horror film Sinners led the nominations with twelve, followed by One Battle After Another with eleven and Hamnet with nine. Sinners also led the winners with a total of four awards, followed by It Was Just an Accident and Weapons with two apiece.

== Winners and nominees ==
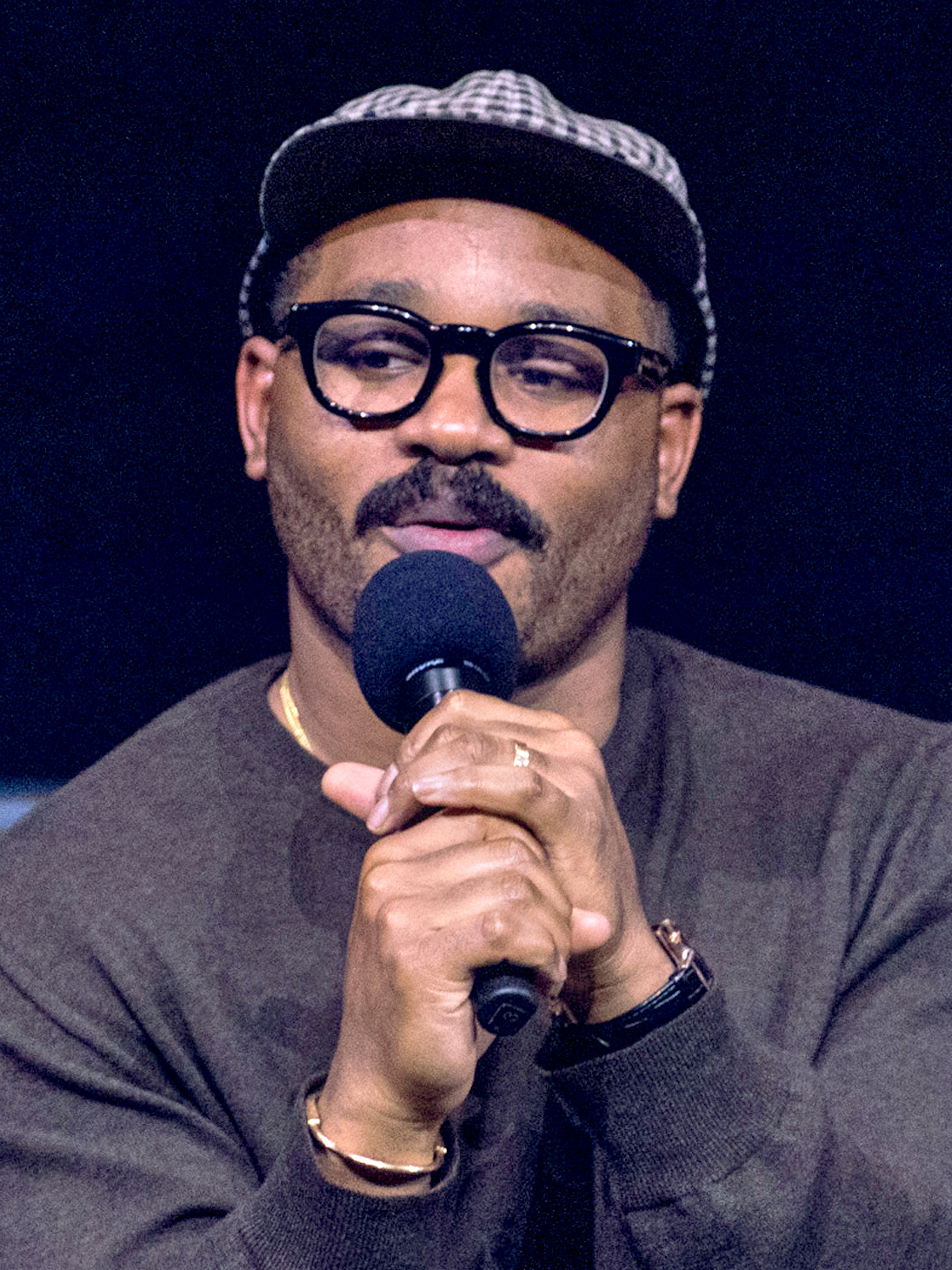
Ryan Coogler, Best Director winner

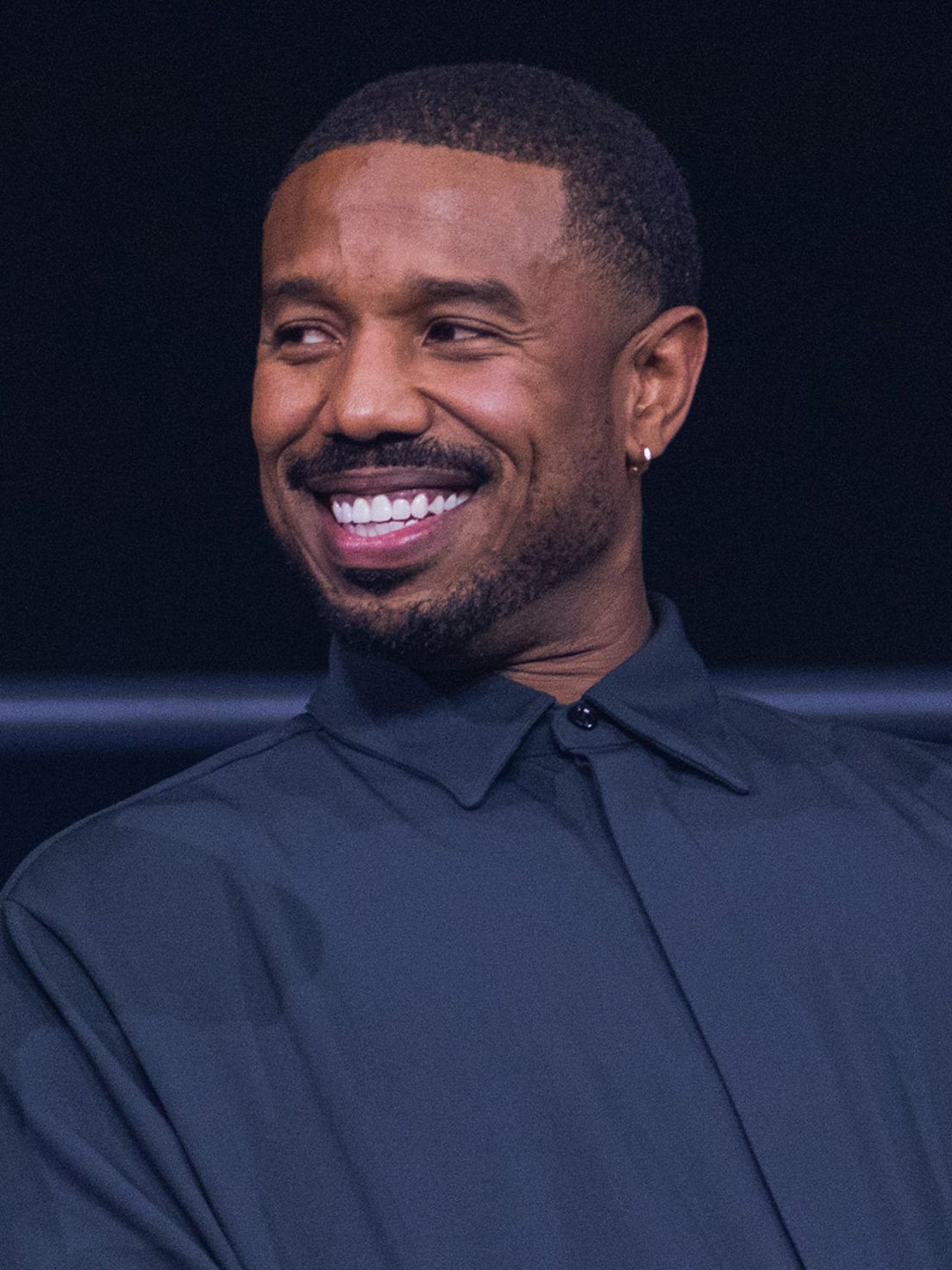
Michael B. Jordan, Best Actor winner

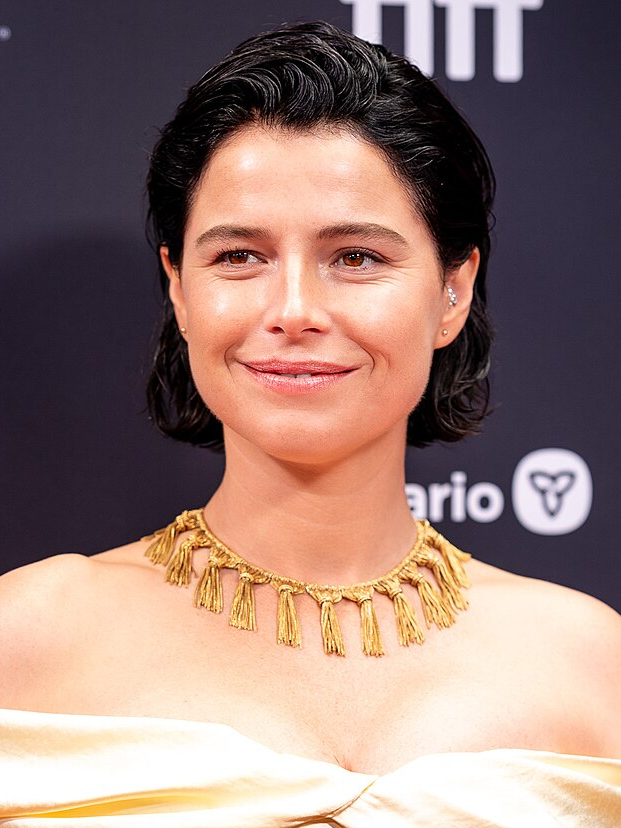
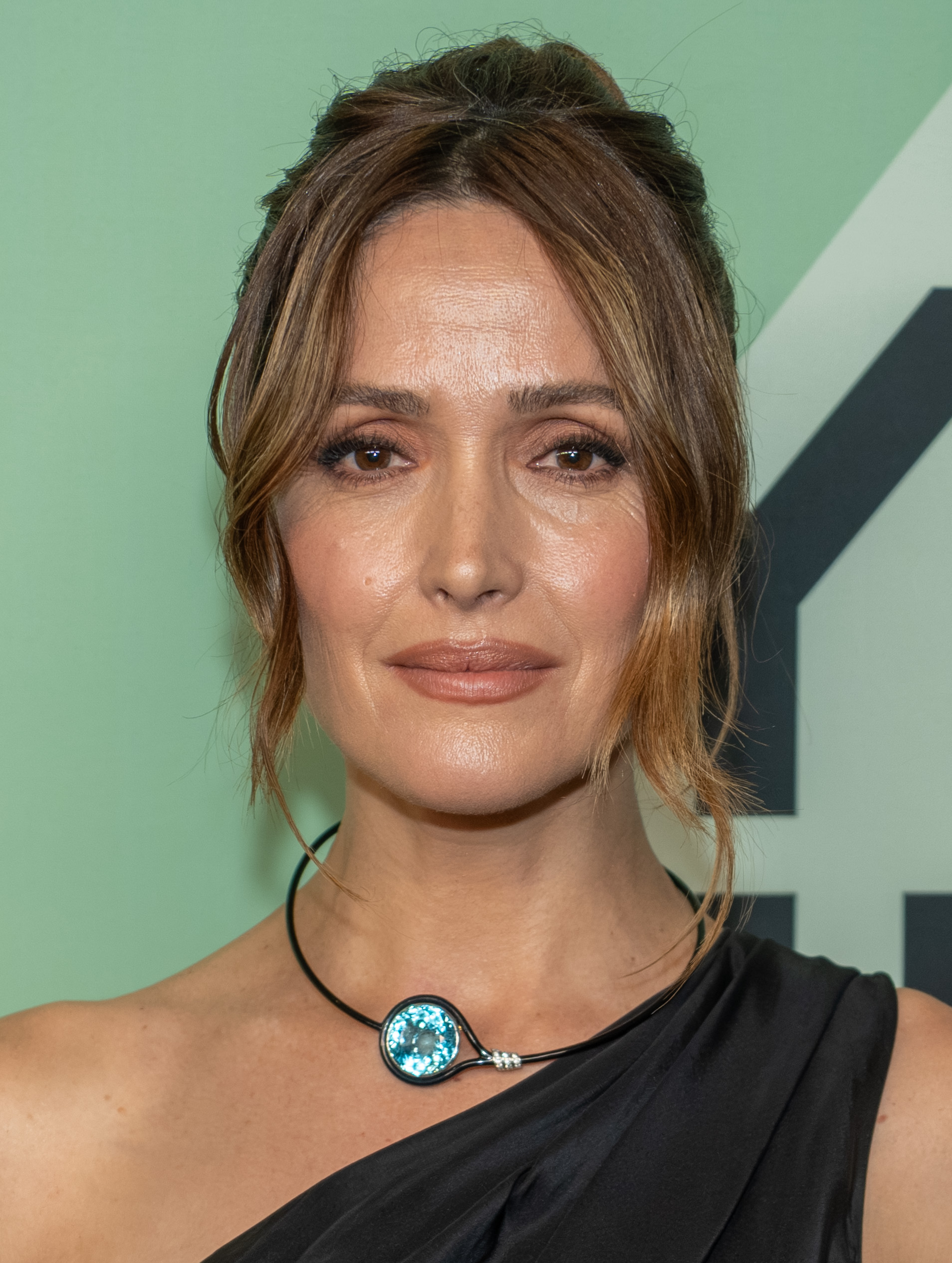
Jessie Buckley and Rose Byrne, Best Actress winners

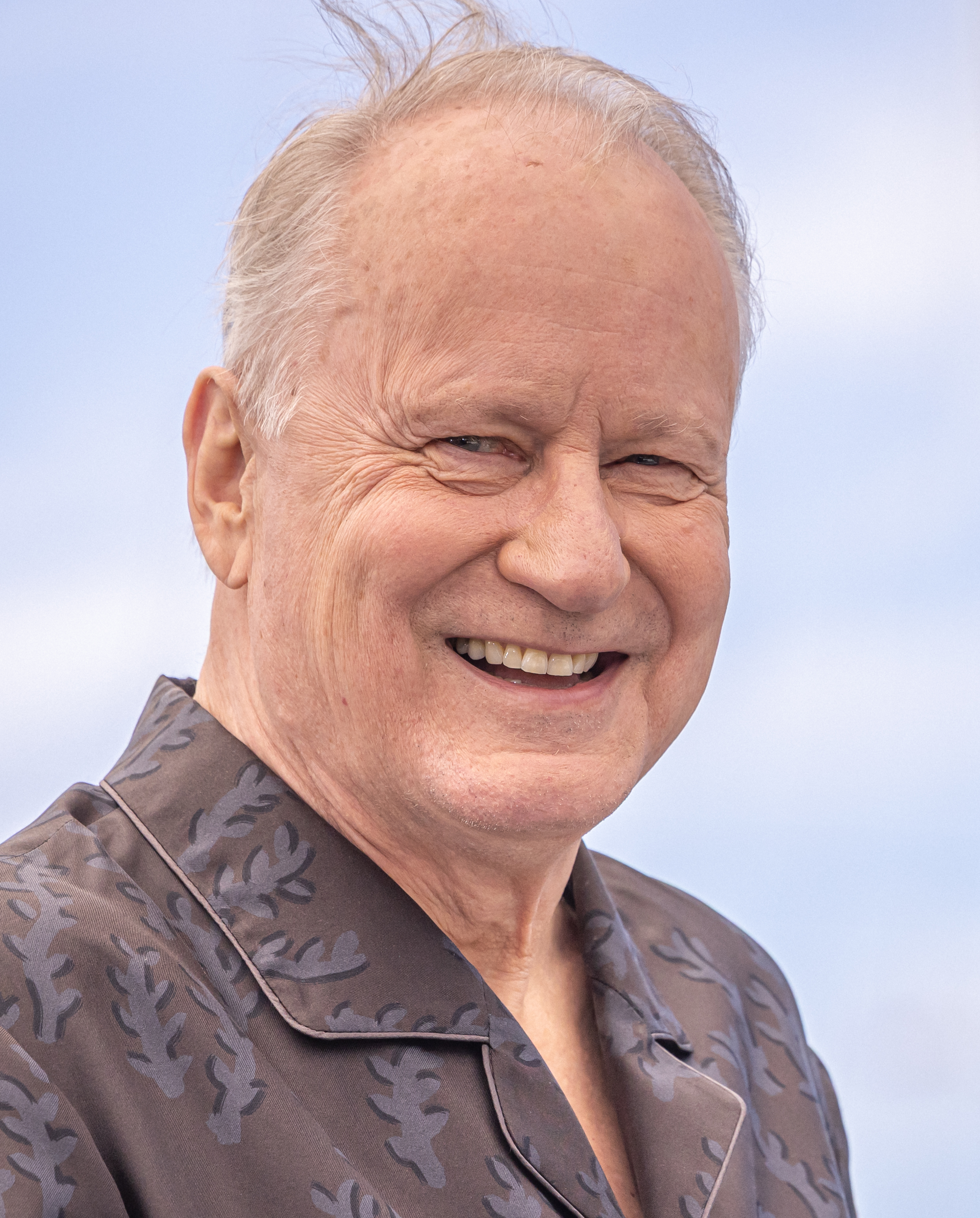
Stellan Skarsgård, Best Supporting Actor winner

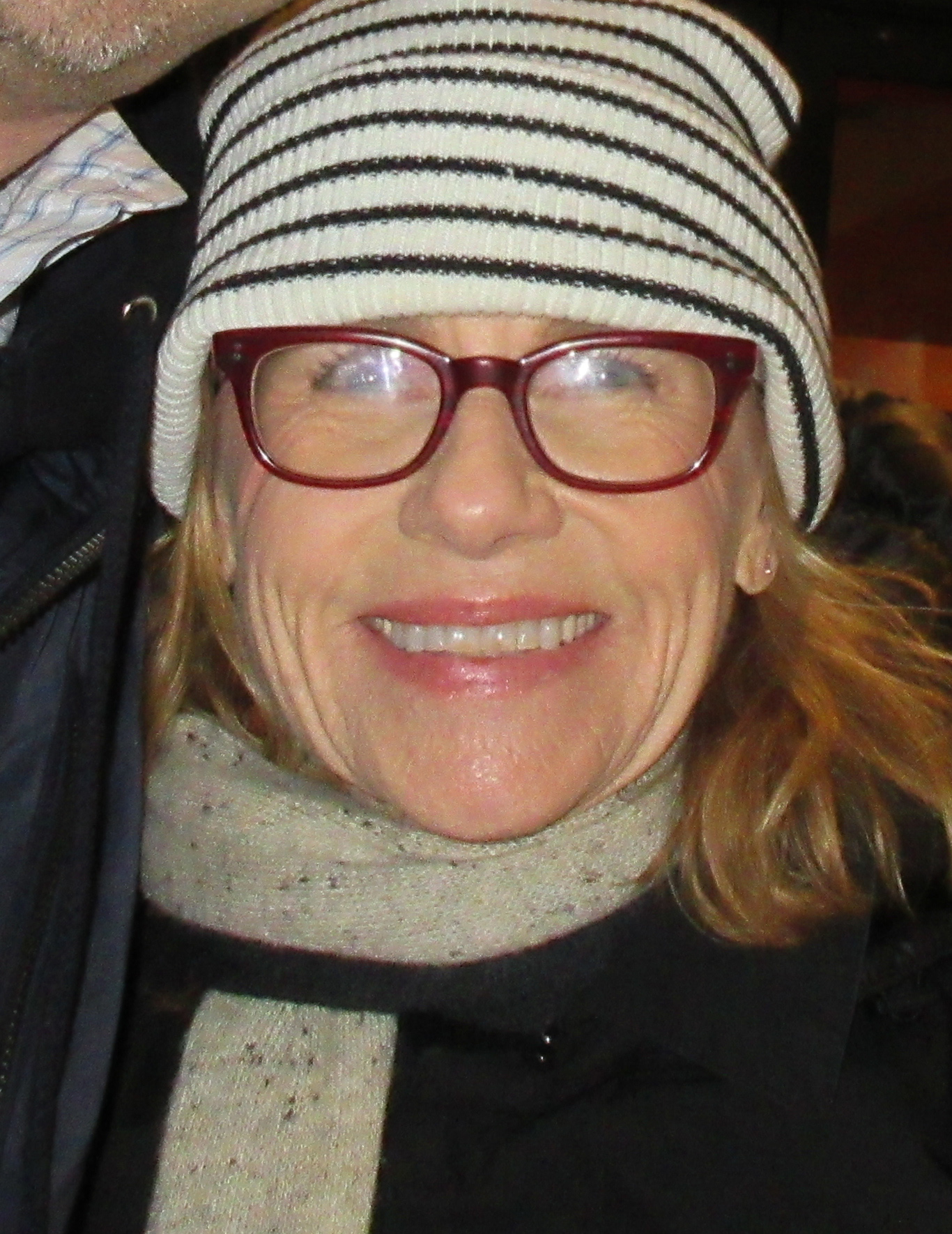
Amy Madigan, Best Supporting Actress winner

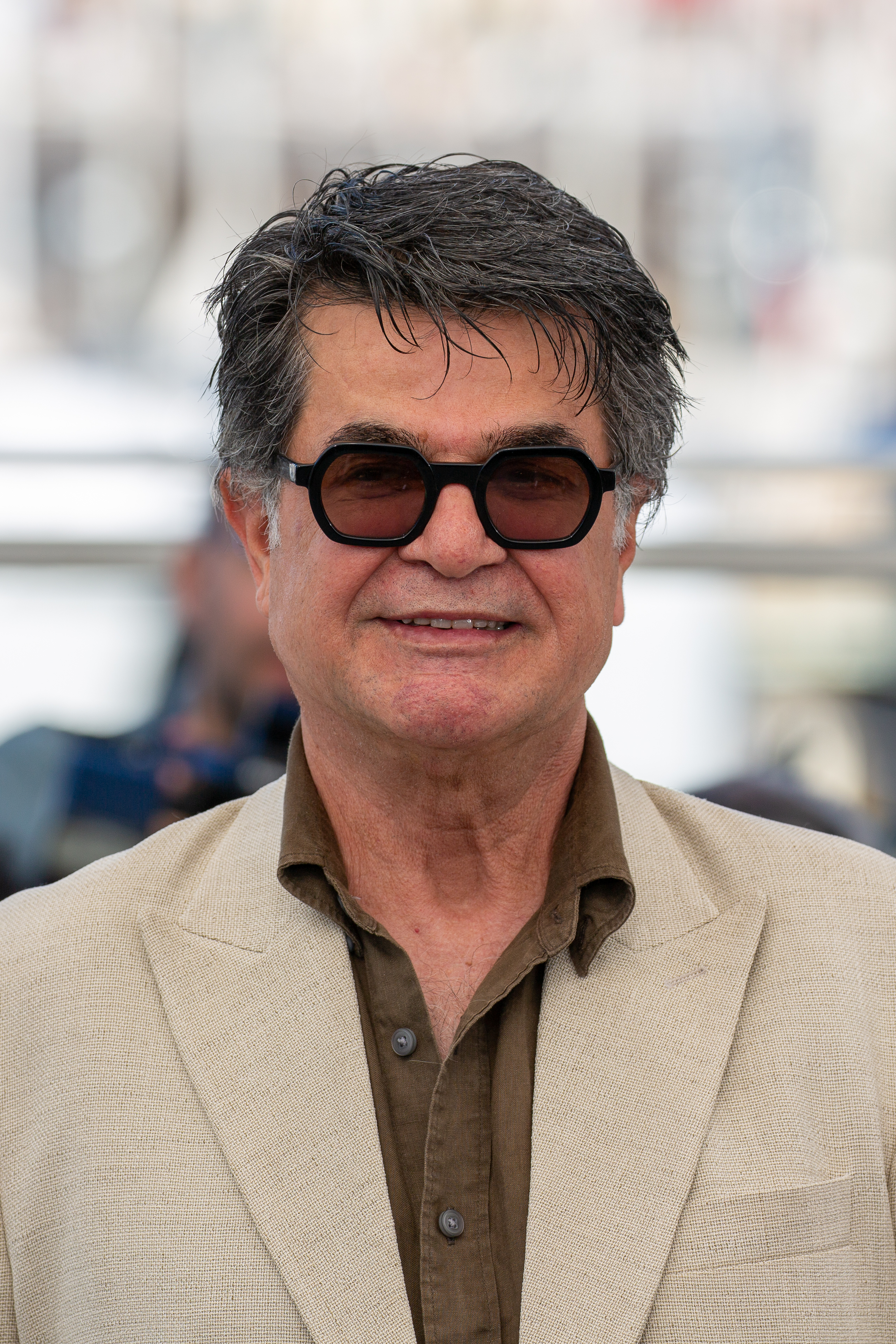
Jafar Panahi, Best Original Screenplay winner

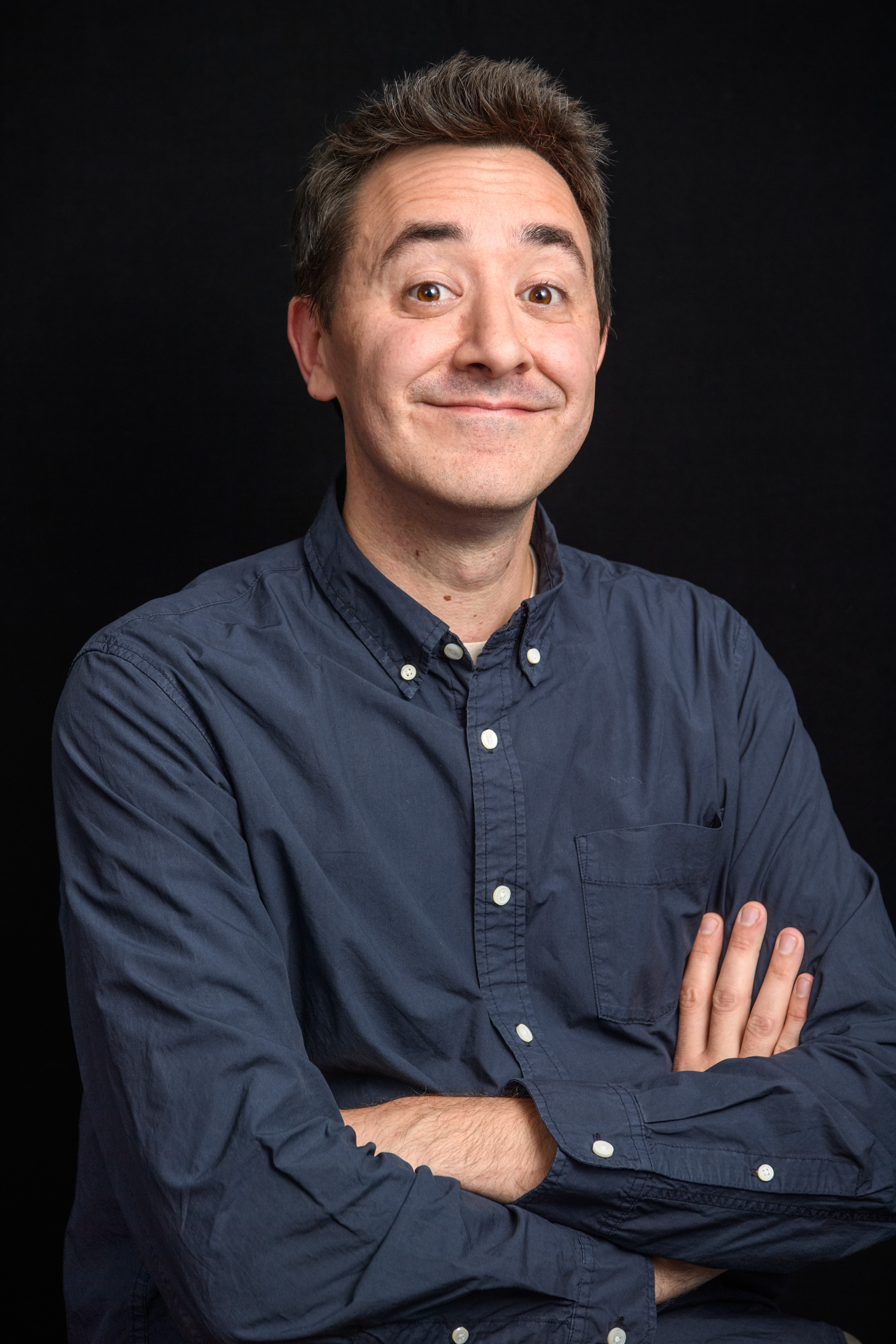
Will Tracy, Best Adapted Screenplay winner

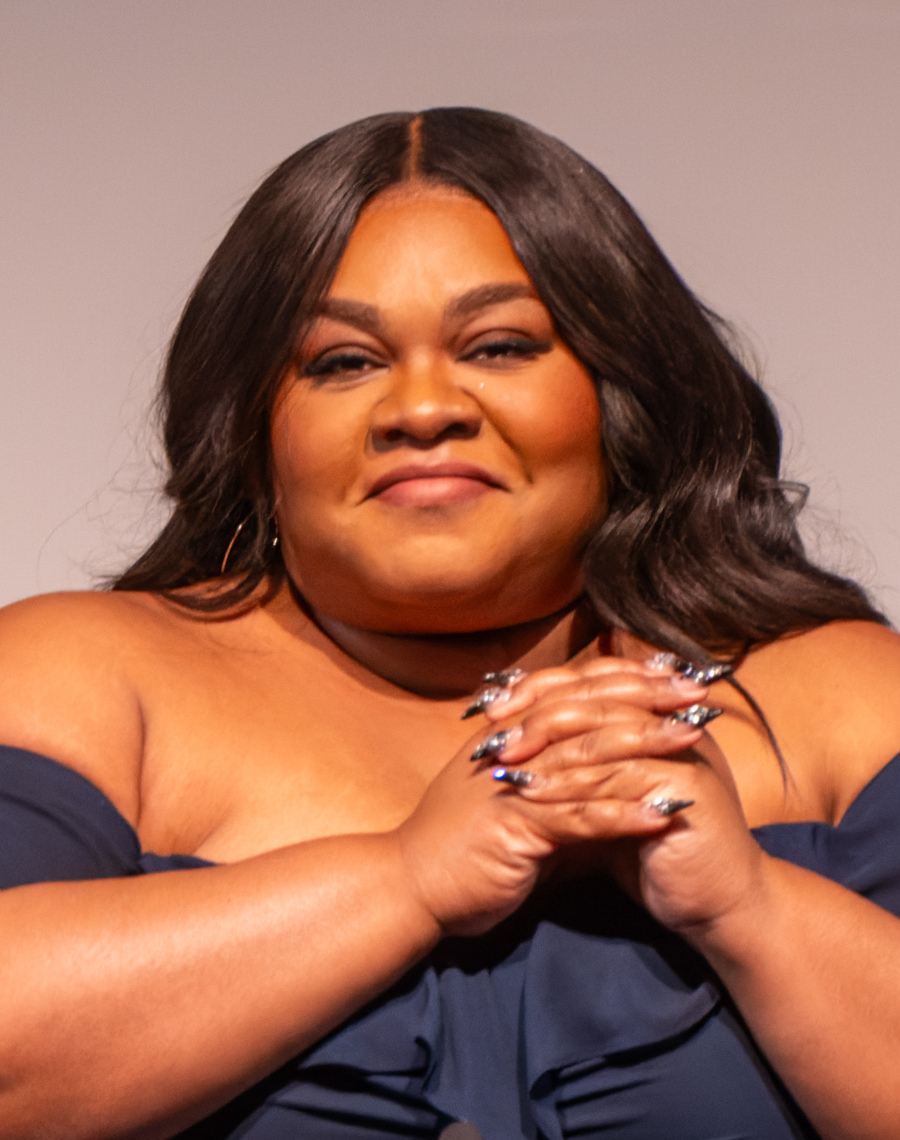
Da'Vine Joy Randolph, Best Comedic Performance winner

Winners are listed at the top of each list in bold, while the runner-ups and nominees for each category are listed under them.

Best Picture	Best Director
**Sinners**; Runner-up: One Battle After Another; Hamnet; It Was Just an Accident; Marty Supreme	**Ryan Coogler – Sinners**; Runner-up: Yorgos Lanthimos – Bugonia; Paul Thomas Anderson – One Battle After Another; Jafar Panahi – It Was Just an Accident; Chloé Zhao – Hamnet
Best Actor	Best Actress
**Michael B. Jordan – Sinners as Elijah "Smoke" Moore / Elias "Stack" Moore**; Runner-up: Joel Edgerton – Train Dreams as Robert Grainier; Timothée Chalamet – Marty Supreme as Marty Mauser; Leonardo DiCaprio – One Battle After Another as Bob Ferguson; Wagner Moura – The Secret Agent as Marcelo Alves / Armando Solimões / Fernando Solimões	**Jessie Buckley – Hamnet as Agnes Shakespeare (TIE)**; **Rose Byrne – If I Had Legs I'd Kick You as Linda (TIE)**; Renate Reinsve – Sentimental Value as Nora Borg; Emma Stone – Bugonia as Michelle Fuller; Eva Victor – Sorry, Baby as Agnes
Best Supporting Actor	Best Supporting Actress
**Stellan Skarsgård – Sentimental Value as Gustav Borg**; Runner-up: Sean Penn – One Battle After Another as Col. Steven J. Lockjaw; Benicio del Toro – One Battle After Another as Sensei Sergio St. Carlos; Jacob Elordi – Frankenstein as The Creature; Jeffrey Wright – Highest 2 Lowest as Paul Christopher	**Amy Madigan – Weapons as Gladys**; Runner-up: Nina Hoss – Hedda as Eileen Lovborg; Runner-up: Wunmi Mosaku – Sinners as Annie; Odessa A'zion – Marty Supreme as Rachel Mizler; Teyana Taylor – One Battle After Another as Perfidia Beverly Hills
Best Original Screenplay	Best Adapted Screenplay
**It Was Just an Accident – Jafar Panahi**; Runner-up: Black Bag – David Koepp; Sentimental Value – Eskil Vogt and Joachim Trier; Sinners – Ryan Coogler; Weapons – Zach Cregger	**Bugonia – Will Tracy**; Runner-up: One Battle After Another – Paul Thomas Anderson; Hamnet – Chloé Zhao and Maggie O'Farrell; The Long Walk – JT Mollner; Train Dreams – Clint Bentley and Greg Kwedar
Best Ensemble	Best Comedic Performance
**Black Bag**; Runner-up: Sinners; Jay Kelly; The Long Walk; Weapons	**Da'Vine Joy Randolph – Eternity as Anna**; Runner-up: Molly Gordon – Oh, Hi! as Iris; Will Arnett – Is This Thing On? as Alex Novak; Liam Neeson – The Naked Gun as Lt. Frank Drebin Jr.; Tim Robinson – Friendship as Craig Waterman
Best Animated Film	Best Documentary
**KPop Demon Hunters**; Runner-up: Little Amélie or the Character of Rain; Elio; Predator: Killer of Killers; Zootopia 2	**Orwell: 2+2=5**; Runner-up: Billy Joel: And So It Goes; Becoming Led Zeppelin; John Candy: I Like Me; Predators
Best Foreign Language Film	Best First Feature (Director)
**It Was Just an Accident • Iran**; Runner-up: Sentimental Value • Norway; Left-Handed Girl • Taiwan; The Secret Agent • Brazil; Sirāt • Spain	**Eva Victor – Sorry, Baby**; Runner-up: Kristen Stewart – The Chronology of Water; Drew Hancock – Companion; Scarlett Johansson – Eleanor the Great; Ben Leonberg – Good Boy
Best Cinematography	Best Editing
**Train Dreams – Adolpho Veloso**; Runner-up: One Battle After Another – Michael Bauman; Frankenstein – Dan Laustsen; Hamnet – Łukasz Żal; Sinners – Autumn Durald Arkapaw	**Marty Supreme – Ronald Bronstein and Josh Safdie**; Runner-up: One Battle After Another – Andy Jurgensen; F1 – Stephen Mirrione and Patrick J. Smith; Hamnet – Affonso Gonçalves and Chloé Zhao; Highest 2 Lowest – Barry Alexander Brown and Allyson C. Johnson
Best Costume Design	Best Production Design
**Wicked: For Good – Paul Tazewell**; Runner-up: Frankenstein – Kate Hawley; Runner-up: Sinners – Ruth E. Carter; The Fantastic Four: First Steps – Alexandra Byrne; Hamnet – Malgosia Turzanska	**Frankenstein – Tamara Deverell and Shane Vieau**; Runner-up: The Fantastic Four: First Steps – Jille Azis and Kasra Farahani; Runner-up: Sinners – Hannah Beachler and Monique Champagne; Hamnet – Fiona Crombie and Alice Felton; Hedda – Cara Brower and Stella Fox
Best Use of Music	Best Stunt Choreography
**Sinners**; Runner-up: Hedda; KPop Demon Hunters; Marty Supreme; Sirāt	**Mission: Impossible – The Final Reckoning**; Runner-up: Sinners; Ballerina; One Battle After Another; Superman
Best Sound Design	Best Visual Effects
**Warfare**; Runner-up: F1; Avatar: Fire and Ash; Frankenstein; Sinners	**Avatar: Fire and Ash**; Runner-up: The Fantastic Four: First Steps; Runner-up: Frankenstein; Mission: Impossible – The Final Reckoning; Superman
Best Youth Performance (For a performer under the age of 18)
**Cary Christopher – Weapons as Alex Lilly**; Runner-up: Jacobi Jupe – Hamnet as Hamnet Shakespeare; Shannon Mahina Gorman – Rental Family as Mia Kawasaki; Alfie Williams – 28 Years Later as Spike; Nina Ye – Left-Handed Girl as I-Jing
Special Award for Body of Work
**Josh O'Connor (The History of Sound, The Mastermind, Rebuilding, and Wake Up Dead Man)**
Breakthrough Performance	Special Award: Best Animal Performance
**Chase Infiniti – One Battle After Another**	**Indy the Dog – Good Boy**
