= Good Boys =

Good Boys may refer to:

- "Good Boys (song)", a 2003 song by Blondie
- Good Boys (film), a 2019 American film
- The Good Boys, a 1997 Indian Malayalam film
- Goodboys, a British production trio

== See also ==
- Good Boy (disambiguation)
