= Boston Society of Film Critics Awards 2025 =

Annual US film awards ceremony

46th BSFC Awards

December 14, 2025

Best Film:
Sinners

The 46th Boston Society of Film Critics Awards, honoring the best in filmmaking in 2025, were given on December 14, 2025.

Ryan Coogler's period supernatural horror film Sinners received the most awards with four wins, including Best Film and Best Director for Coogler. Other films with multiple awards were Blue Moon and Sentimental Value with two wins each. The meeting to decide the winners was dedicated to American filmmaker David Lynch, who died on January 15, 2025; the director had ties to Boston, where he studied at the School of the Museum of Fine Arts.

A new category was introduced this year (Best in Show) to recognize the best animal performance of the year in film. Indy, from Good Boy, was the inaugural recipient.

== Winners ==
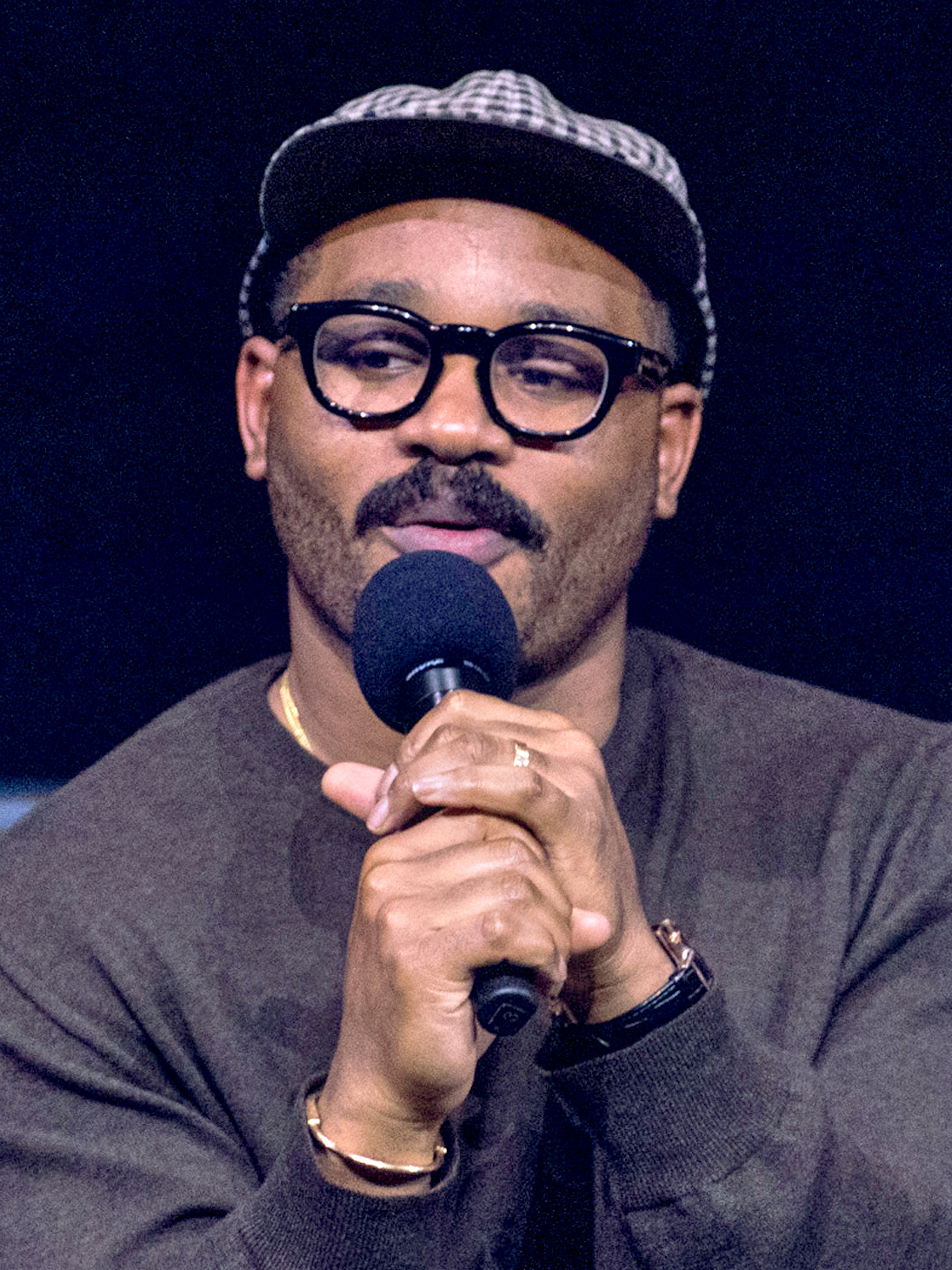
Ryan Coogler, Best Director winner

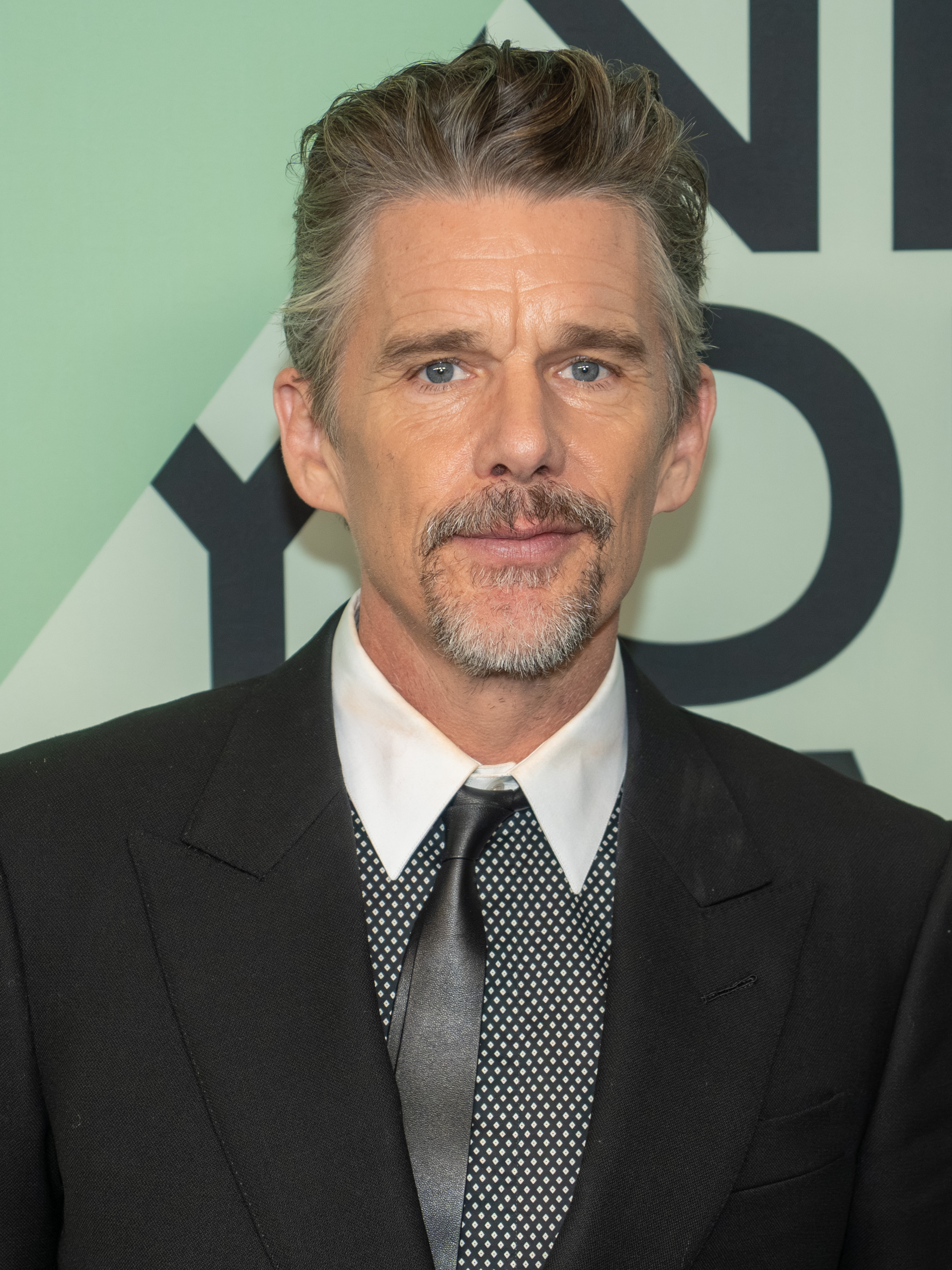
Ethan Hawke, Best Actor winner

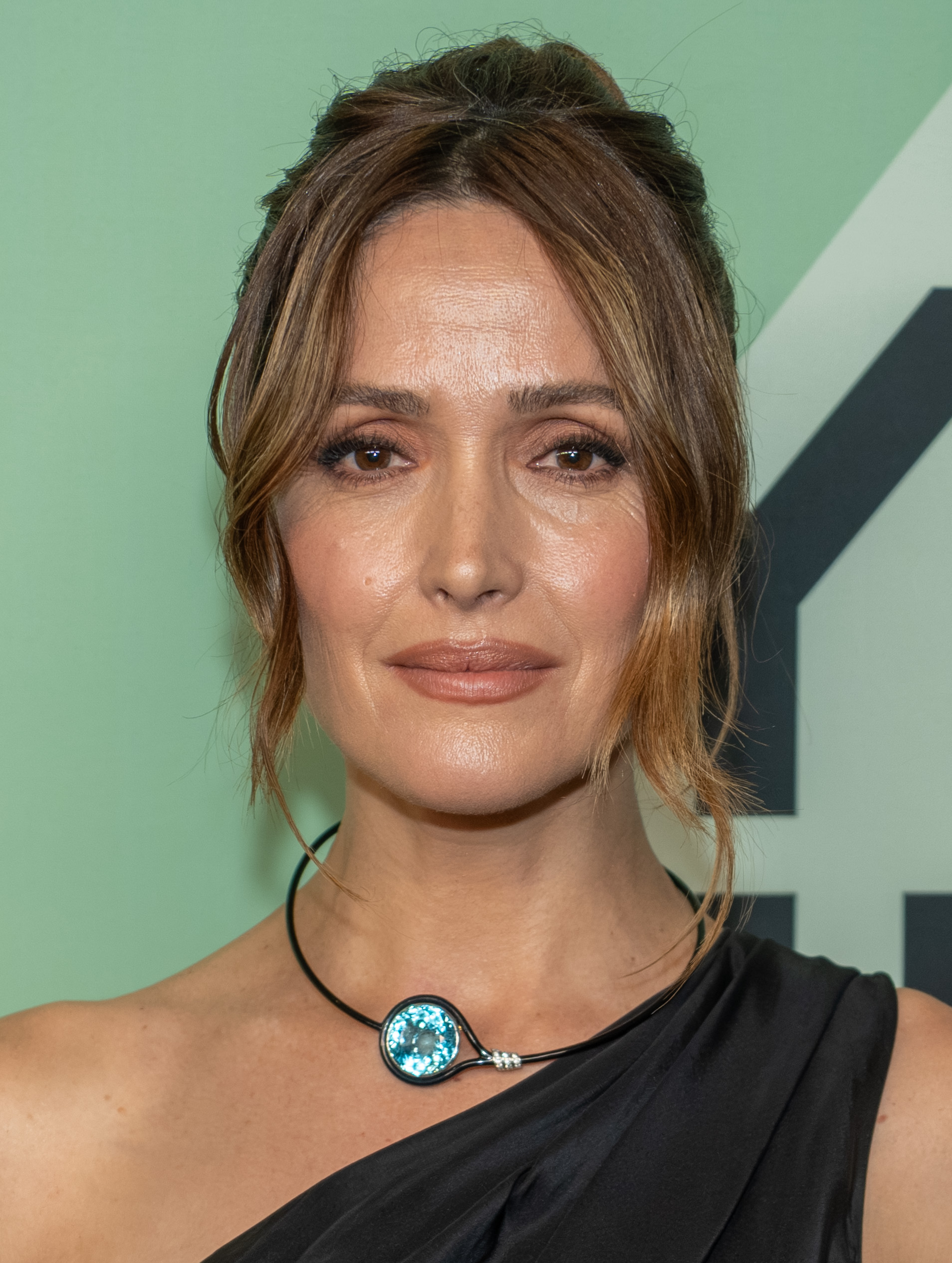
Rose Byrne, Best Actress winner

- Best Film:
  - Sinners
- Best Director:
  - Ryan Coogler – Sinners
- Best Actor:
  - Ethan Hawke – Blue Moon
- Best Actress:
  - Rose Byrne – If I Had Legs I'd Kick You
- Best Supporting Actor:
  - Stellan Skarsgård – Sentimental Value
- Best Supporting Actress:
  - Amy Madigan – Weapons
- Best Ensemble Cast:
  - Marty Supreme
- Best Original Screenplay:
  - Blue Moon – Robert Kaplow
- Best Adapted Screenplay:
  - One Battle After Another – Paul Thomas Anderson
- Best Cinematography:
  - Sinners – Autumn Durald Arkapaw
- Best Film Editing:
  - F1 – Stephen Mirrione
- Best Original Score:
  - Sinners – Ludwig Göransson
- Best Documentary Film:
  - Afternoons of Solitude
- Best Non-English Language Film:
  - Sentimental Value (Norway)
- Best Animated Film:
  - Endless Cookie
- Best New Filmmaker:
  - Eva Victor – Sorry, Baby
- Best in Show (Best Animal Performance):
  - Indy – Good Boy
