= Good Boy =

Good Boy may refer to:

== Film ==
- Good Boy!, a 2003 American science fiction comedy
- Good Boy (2005 film), an Indian Telugu-language romantic drama
- Gud Boy, a 2012 Indian Oriya film
- Good Boy (2016 film), a Russian film directed by Oksana Karas
- Good Boy (2022 film), a Norwegian thriller by Viljar Bøe
- Good Boy (2023 film), a British short comedy drama by Tom Stuart
- Good Boy (2025 Komasa film), a black comedy thriller by Jan Komasa
- Good Boy (2025 Leonberg film), an American supernatural horror film by Ben Leonberg

== Music ==
- "Good Boy", a 2025 single by Paris Paloma, also on the 2026 album The Fatal Flaw
- Good Boy, an EP by Baek Ji-young
- "Good Boy" (song), by G-Dragon and Taeyang
- "Gxxd Boy", a song by Everglow
- Good Boy, a 1928 musical by Herbert Stothart, Otto Harbach, Bert Kalmar, and Harry Ruby

== Literature ==
- Good Boy (comics), a Marvel Comics character

== Television ==
- Good Boy (TV series), a 2025 South Korean TV series
- Good Boy (Thai TV series), a 2026 Thai TV series
- "Good Boy" (Into the Dark), an episode of the second season of Into the Dark

== See also ==
- Good Boys (disambiguation)
- Good Boy, Bad Boy, a 2007 Indian film
