= Good Boy (2025 Leonberg film) =

2025 American horror film

- Theatrical release poster
- Directed by: Ben Leonberg
- Written by: Alex Cannon; Ben Leonberg
- Produced by: Kari Fischer; Ben Leonberg
- Starring: Indy; Shane Jensen; Arielle Friedman; Larry Fessenden
- Cinematography: Wade Grebnoel; Ben Leonberg
- Edited by: Ben Leonberg; Curtis Roberts
- Music by: Sam Boase-Miller
- Production company: What's Wrong With Your Dog?
- Distributed by: Independent Film Company; Shudder
- Release dates: March 8, 2025 (SXSW); October 3, 2025 (United States)
- Running time: 73 minutes
- Country: United States
- Language: English
- Budget: $70,000
- Box office: $8.8 million

Good Boy is a 2025 American supernatural horror film directed by Ben Leonberg, who co-wrote it with Alex Cannon. It stars Leonberg's dog, Indy, as himself, with Shane Jensen, Arielle Friedman, and Larry Fessenden in supporting roles. The film follows Indy as he attempts to rescue his owner Todd (Jensen), a young man with a chronic lung disease who is gradually engulfed by a supernatural presence after moving into his late grandfather's rural woodland home.

The film marks the feature-length directorial debut of Leonberg, who conceived the idea after re-watching Poltergeist (1982) and noting the horror trope of dogs sensing the presence of ghosts before humans. He decided to write a traditional haunted house film from the perspective of a dog. Leonberg and Cannon began writing the screenplay in 2017, emphasizing action and perspective over dialogue to reflect the dog's point of view. Indy had no prior acting experience when Leonberg cast him as the lead. The film was shot over a three-year period in Harding Township, New Jersey, with Leonberg and Wade Grebnoel serving as cinematographers. For much of the shoot, only Indy, Leonberg, and producer Kari Fischer, Leonberg's wife, were present on set.

Good Boy premiered at the 2025 South by Southwest Film & TV Festival on March 8, and was released theatrically in the United States by Independent Film Company and Shudder on October 3. The film was a commercial success, grossing $8.8 million on a $70,000 budget. It received generally positive reviews, with praise for its ambitious concept, technical craftsmanship, visual style, emotionally resonant themes, and Indy's performance in the lead role. However, some reviewers were critical of the storytelling, citing a convoluted narrative and pacing issues. For his performance, Indy won an Astra Award, making him the first canine to win a major film acting award that had previously recognized only human performers.

== Plot ==
Indy, a Nova Scotia Duck Tolling Retriever, moves with his owner Todd, who suffers from a chronic lung disease, from New York City to Todd’s late grandfather's rural, uninhabited home in the woods. Todd's sister, Vera, worries about Todd's isolation at the home, believing the house is haunted and contributed to their grandfather's death there. Indy immediately senses a presence in the home, often manifesting in shadows and sometimes appearing as a dark, skeletal figure drenched in mud.

While roaming the woods, Indy and Todd encounter Richard, a longtime neighbor who warns them of fox traps he has set in the area. Richard informs Todd that he was the one who found Todd's grandfather's corpse, and that his grandfather's Golden Retriever, Bandit, has been missing since. Indy recurrently observes the dark entity in the house and encounters an apparition of Bandit which leads him upstairs. Beneath a wardrobe, Indy finds a bandana that belonged to Bandit. Indy also experiences recurring dreams of being attacked by the dark figure, and has visions of Todd's grandfather, who appears to have died in the home of a similar disease.

Meanwhile, Todd's health worsens and he begins regularly coughing up blood. He becomes increasingly aggressive toward Indy and Vera, who constantly checks in on him by phone. Late one night, Indy awakens to find Todd in an incoherent state, slamming his head against the basement door. While Todd sleeps, Indy observes the figure approaching the bedroom. Todd awakens, collapses, and is separated from Indy after the entity closes a door between them. Indy escapes the house, intending to find Richard so he can help Todd, but becomes caught in one of Richard's fox snares. Todd reprimands him by leashing him outside and forcing him to sleep in a doghouse.

While outside one night, Indy senses the dark figure and hears Todd coughing loudly from the upstairs bedroom. The figure attempts to attack Indy, but he breaks free by running into the doghouse, knocking it over and breaking the chain from its anchor inside. Indy finds the home's cellar door open and infiltrates the home, encountering Bandit's skeleton in the process. Meanwhile, the dark figure approaches Todd in his bedroom while he is in a weakened, rapidly deteriorating state. Indy arrives in the bedroom and comforts Todd, who turns and faces his own corpse on the bed; realizing he has died, Todd is dragged by the figure through the house and into the basement. Indy chases him, attempting to save him as he is pulled into a dark, cavernous tunnel. Todd, accepting his fate, tells Indy he is a good dog but cannot rescue him, before the dark figure seizes him.

The following morning, Vera arrives at the house, finding Todd's dead body and Indy sitting alone at the bottom of the cellar entrance. Vera tearfully calls for Indy, who pauses after hearing Todd's whistling from the tunnel, before ascending the stairs to her.

The end credits that follow show various scenes of Indy sticking his head out Vera’s car window while they drive through the woods. At the end, a whistle similar to Todd’s is heard, prompting Indy to get back inside the car.

== Cast ==
- Indy as himself, a Nova Scotia Duck Tolling Retriever
- Shane Jensen as Todd, Indy's owner
- Arielle Friedman as Vera, Todd's younger sister
- Larry Fessenden as Todd's grandfather
- Stuart Rudin as Richard, Todd's neighbor
- Max as Bandit, the Golden Retriever owned by Todd and Vera's grandfather
- Anya Krawcheck as Todd's doctor

== Production ==
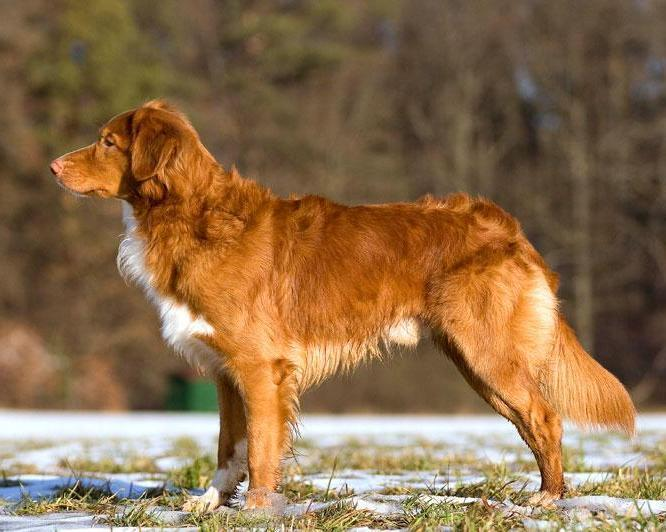
The film stars Indy, a Nova Scotia Duck Tolling Retriever (example pictured), owned by director Ben Leonberg.

In 2012, Ben Leonberg conceived the idea for a supernatural horror film framed from a dog's perspective after re-watching the 1982 film Poltergeist, in which the central family's dog is the first to sense the presence of ghosts, and realizing that it was a trope among other horror films centered around a haunted house. Leonberg also cited the 1980 film The Shining as an influence for Good Boy, noting that both films question whether the characters' seemingly supernatural experiences are genuine or products of their psychological state, and feature endings open to interpretation. Leonberg and his co-writer Alex Cannon began writing the film in 2017. Leonberg envisioned the film as a tribute to dogs and their relationship with humans. As the story could not utilize dialogue to progress, Cannon and Leonberg wrote the story to emphasize action, perspective, and point of view.

The film was directed by Leonberg in his feature directorial debut, and produced by his wife, Kari Fischer. They cast their dog, Indy, a Nova Scotia Duck Tolling Retriever, as the film's lead. The decision came after Leonberg participated in The Rode Reel, an online short film competition, with an entry starring Indy. The short won the Judges' Film Prize and a financial award that helped fund the full-length feature, while Indy himself earned a nomination for Best Actor. Encouraged by the film's reception and Indy's recognition, Leonberg chose to cast him as the lead in Good Boy. Indy had no formal acting training prior to the film, and Leonberg originally did not envision Indy as the lead while writing. However, he described Indy as having an "intense, unblinking stare" and expressive movements that he thought would make him a good fit for the role. To begin production, Leonberg developed a loose storyboard after recognizing that it was impossible to plan each shot with complete precision, as Indy's movements were unpredictable and could not be timed like those of a human actor. Cinematography and lighting were adapted to account for the dog's unpredictable movement.

Good Boy was filmed in Leonberg's home in Harding Township, New Jersey, over a three-year period from April 2021 to August 2024. This accounted for over 400 days of filming. The lengthy filming schedule was attributed to Indy not having a double, like many dog-focused films do, and thus portraying himself in every scene of the film. Additionally, very few shots were completed per day as Indy would get distracted after a few hours of filming; Leonberg consequently edited the film as production progressed. For much of the principal photography, only Fischer, Leonberg, and Indy were present on set to minimize distractions. Fischer and Leonberg physically performed most of the human characters on camera, adding the credited actors' voices in post-production, because Indy would only perform certain actions with his real-life owners.

To direct Indy, Leonberg would make bizarre noises and say unfamiliar words in strange vocal tones to elicit a natural reaction from the animal, while a toy dog was used to guide him in particular directions. (Note: Attributed to multiple references:) A stuffed replica of Indy, which Leonberg nicknamed 'Findy', was used as a stand-in for Indy when setting up various shots of the film and performing stunts. As the film aimed to capture a dog's point of view, Leonberg and his co-cinematographer Wade Grebnoel utilized visual techniques such as filming from a low angle to frame Indy in the center to prioritize his viewpoint and rarely showing human characters above the waist. Leonberg stated that much of Indy's performance was crafted through filming and post-production techniques, such as music, sound design, and the Kuleshov effect to convey audience interpretation, rather than emotional expression from the animal. (Note: Attributed to multiple references:) Leonberg explained that Indy's vocalizations were recorded separately and added during post-production, with sound effects sometimes modified or sourced from libraries. It uses limited computer-generated imagery, none of which to enhance Indy's performance. Leonberg and Fischer set up their own production company for the film, called What's Wrong With Your Dog? The film was completed on a production budget of $70,000 and has a 73-minute runtime.

== Release ==
Good Boy premiered at the 2025 South by Southwest Film & TV Festival on March 8 in the Alamo Drafthouse Cinema in Austin, Texas. It screened again at the Overlook Film Festival in New Orleans in April 2025. The film had its Canadian premiere at the Calgary Underground Film Festival and was also later screened in July 2025 at the Fantasia International Film Festival in Montreal, Quebec. The film was originally scheduled for a limited theatrical release, but the popularity of its trailer and poster, which achieved the largest reach in the Independent Film Company's (IFC) history, led to it receiving a wide theatrical release. In May 2025, the streaming service Shudder acquired the distribution rights to the film for Australia, Canada, Ireland, New Zealand, the United Kingdom, and the United States. It was screened at the Melbourne International Film Festival on August 8, and later at the Film at Lincoln Center on August 19, 2025. It was released theatrically throughout the United States on October 3, 2025 via the IFC. In the United Kingdom and Ireland, Good Boy was released in theaters on October 10, via Vertigo Releasing. It was also released on streaming on October 24. It premiered on Shudder on November 21.

== Reception ==
=== Box office ===
Good Boy grossed $990,000 on its domestic opening night. On its opening Saturday, Good Boy grossed $777,700. Throughout its opening weekend, the film was screened at 1,650 theaters, IFC's second-highest opening weekend theater count in its history, and grossed $2.3 million, debuting as the ninth-highest-grossing film of that weekend. (Note: Attributed to multiple references:) It was IFC's second-best opening weekend gross in history, and within the larger IFC Entertainment Group, it ranked as the third-largest opening weekend, behind Clown in a Cornfield (2025, which was released by RLJ Entertainment) and Late Night with the Devil (2023). (Note: Attributed to multiple references:) In its second weekend, Good Boy stayed in 1,650 theaters, earning about $1.36 million over the weekend and $1.6 million over the long four-day period. By its third weekend, the film had earned $5.59 million domestically, and over $450,000 internationally. The film ultimately grossed $8.8 million at the worldwide box office.

=== Critical response ===
Good Boy received generally positive reviews. (Note: Attributed to multiple references:) Critics commended its craftsmanship and technical execution given the challenges of its concept. (Note: Attributed to multiple references:) Chase Hutchison of TheWrap said the film "thrives in its technical approach", and Benjamin Lee of The Guardian called it a strong showcase of Leonberg's capabilities, despite having limited resources. Critics responded positively to Good Boy's cinematography and visuals. (Note: Attributed to multiple references:) Fangoria critic Jordan Hoffman described it as a "marvel of imagery" for its vivid outdoor visuals and the haunting atmosphere of its indoor scenes, and Wendy Ide of The Observer described the film as "cleverly framed and murkily atmospheric". Reviewers lauded Indy's performance as the lead. (Note: Attributed to multiple references:) It was described by Mick LaSalle of the San Francisco Chronicle as "a marvel of sensitivity, alertness and nuance", and Rendy Jones of Den of Geek likened it to the title character of the animated comedy horror series Courage the Cowardly Dog. Carlos Morales of IGN cited it as the primary reason to watch the film.

Although many critics appreciated the novelty of the film's premise, (Note: Attributed to multiple references:) the storytelling received a mixed response, as some considered it to be convoluted, underwhelming, and thinly scripted. (Note: Attributed to multiple references:) In the Los Angeles Times, critic Amy Nicholson called the film's story underwhelming and restrained, and Kevin Maher of The Times was critical of what he felt were the story's plot holes and pacing inconsistencies. Some also criticized the film for feeling drawn out, despite its relatively short runtime. (Note: Attributed to multiple references:) Despite this, many voiced that they found the film emotionally moving and thought-provoking. (Note: Attributed to multiple references:) Peter Debruge (Variety) and Meagan Navarro (Bloody Disgusting) both agreed that the film's emotional impact stemmed from Indy's immense loyalty to his owner, finding it deepened their appreciation for dogs. Most critics found the film to be effectively scary and suspenseful. (Note: Attributed to multiple references:) The Hollywood Reporter's Frank Scheck and IndieWire's Rafael Motamayor both noted that the film's scares felt familiar and unoriginal, but remained effective throughout the runtime. Kim Newman, writing for the British Film Institute, called the film "a study in creeping dread rather than shocks".

On the review aggregator website Rotten Tomatoes, it holds an approval rating of 90% based on 189 reviews, with an average rating of 7.2/10. The website's consensus reads: "Good Boy is a visually striking, emotionally devastating horror film that eschews genre conventions to deliver a uniquely haunting and conceptually ambitious experience." On Metacritic, the film has a weighted average score of 73 out of 100, based on 23 reviews, indicating "generally favorable" reviews. Audiences polled by CinemaScore gave the film an average grade of "B" on an A+ to F scale. Both Ian Sandwell of Digital Spy and Rafael Motamayor of IndieWire called it one of the year's best horror films.

=== Accolades ===
The National Board of Review, at its 2025 ceremony, listed Good Boy as one of the year's ten best independent films. For Indy's nomination for the Best Performance in a Horror or Thriller at the 9th Astra Film Awards, he made history as the first animal to both be nominated for, and win, a major film acting award that had previously only recognized human talent. Indy did not attend the ceremony, but appeared in an video with Leonberg to accept the award.

Award	Date of ceremony	Category	Recipient	Result	Ref.
Astra Film Awards	January 9, 2026	Best First Feature	Good Boy	Nominated	
Astra Film Awards	January 9, 2026	Best Performance in a Horror or Thriller	Indy	Won	
Austin Film Critics Association	December 18, 2025	Special Award	Indy	Won (Note: For a uniquely realized performance in the field of animal acting.)	
Boston Society of Film Critics	December 14, 2025	Best in Show (Best Animal Performance)	Indy	Won	
Critics' Choice Super Awards	August 6, 2026	Best Good Boy in a Horror Movie	Indy	Honored	
Fantasy Filmfest	September 27, 2025	Fresh Blood Award	Good Boy	Nominated	
Film Independent Spirit Awards	February 15, 2026	Best Editing	Ben Leonberg	Nominated	
Las Vegas Film Critics Society	December 19, 2025	Best Animal Performance	Indy	Won	
National Board of Review	December 3, 2025	Top 10 Independent Films	Good Boy	Won (Note: This award does not have a single winner, but recognizes multiple films.)	
Overlook Film Festival	April 10, 2025	Scariest Feature Film	Good Boy	Nominated	
People for the Ethical Treatment of Animals	October 13, 2025	Great Filmmaking Award	Good Boy	Won	
San Diego Film Critics Society	December 15, 2025	Best First Feature (Director)	Ben Leonberg	Nominated	
San Diego Film Critics Society	December 15, 2025	Special Award: Best Animal Performance	Indy	Won	
Saturn Awards	March 8, 2026	Best Independent Film	Good Boy	Nominated	
Seattle Film Critics Society	December 15, 2025	Special Citation	Indy	Won (Note: For achievements in animal acting.)	
Sitges Film Festival	October 18, 2025	Best Motion Picture Award	Good Boy	Nominated	
South by Southwest Film & TV Festival	March 12, 2025	Howl of Fame Award (Best Canine Performance)	Indy	Won	(Note: Attributed to multiple references:)
Strasbourg European Fantastic Film Festival	October 6, 2025	Best International Feature Film	Good Boy	Won	
