= Sonia Faleiro =

Indian writer and journalist (born 1977)

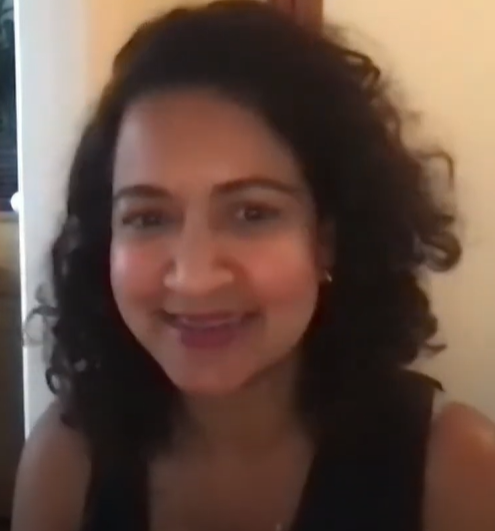
- Faleiro in 2021
- Born: 1977 (age 48–49); Goa, India
- Occupations: Writer; journalist
- Years active: 2006–present
- Known for: The Good Girls: An Ordinary Killing (2021)
- Spouse: Ulrik McKnight
- Children: 1
- Father: Eduardo Faleiro
- Website: soniafaleiro.com

Sonia Faleiro (born 1977) is an Indian writer and journalist based in London, UK. Her first novel The Girl was published by Viking in 2006. This was followed by Beautiful Thing: Inside the Secret World of Bombay's Dance Bars (2010), and the e-single 13 Men (2015). Faleiro's book The Good Girls: An Ordinary Killing, was well received by the critics.

== Early life and education ==
Faleiro was born in Goa, grew up in New Delhi, India, where she studied history at St. Stephen's College, and received her master's degree from the University of Edinburgh. While in graduate school, Faleiro started writing her first novel, The Girl, which was published by Penguin Viking in 2006.

== Awards ==
Faleiro was awarded the 2011 Karmaveer Puraskaar for Social Justice for "drawing attention to India's most vulnerable and writing about them with sensitivity, humanity and integrity". She is the recipient of a runners-up award in the CNN Young Journalist Award of 2006.

== Bibliography ==
- Faleiro, Sonia (2008). The Girl. New York: Penguin Books Limited. ISBN 978-93-5214-150-0.
- —————— (2005). "Stupid". First Proof: The Penguin Book of New Writing from India 2. Penguin Books. ISBN 978-0-1440-0107-1.
- —————— (2006). "Outkast D'Souza". Reflected in Water: Writings on Goa. Penguin Books India. ISBN 978-0-1431-0081-2.
- —————— (2008). AIDS Sutra: Untold Stories from India. Vintage Books. ISBN 978-0-3074-5472-0.
- —————— (2009). "The Ballet Dancer". Sarpanch Sahib: Changing the Face of India. HarperCollins. ISBN 978-9-3502-9456-7.
- —————— (2011). Beautiful Thing: Inside the Secret World of Bombay's Dance Bars. Canongate Books. ISBN 978-0-8578-6172-6.
- —————— (2015). 13 Men. Deca.
- —————— (2021). The Good Girls: An Ordinary Killing. New York: Grove Press. ISBN 978-0-8021-5820-8.
- —————— (2025). The Robe and the Sword: How Buddhist Extremism Is Shaping Modern Asia. New York: Columbia Global Reports. ISBN 978-1-9671-9000-3.

== Personal life ==
Sonia Faleiro is the daughter of veteran Indian National Congress politician Eduardo Faleiro. She is married to American businessman and former business partner of politician Rahul Gandhi, Ulrik McKnight. They live in London and have a daughter.
