= The Good Girls: An Ordinary Killing =

2021 nonfiction book by Sonia Falerio

- First edition
- Author: Sonia Faleiro
- Language: English
- Genre: Non-fiction
- Publisher: Grove Press
- Publication date: 9 February 2021
- Publication place: India
- Media type: Print (paperback, hardback)
- Pages: 314
- ISBN: 080215820X

The Good Girls: An Ordinary Killing is a 2021 narrative non-fiction book by Sonia Faleiro. It tells the story of the 2014 Badaun gang-rape incident. Faleiro initially started the investigation with a plan to write a book about rape in India, but as she learned more about the case, she realised it was much more complicated than what everyone knew. She spent four years researching on the subject, traveled to the village, interviewed over 100 people including the relatives, the accused and the cops, compiled transcripts of the polygraph tests and other reports. It was released on 9 February 2021 via Grove Press and was well received by the critics.

== Plot ==
On 26 May 2014, two teenagers Padma Shakya and Lalli Shakya, disappeared from their home in the village of Katra Sadatganj in Badaun, Uttar Pradesh. The next morning, their dead bodies were found hanging from a tree in a mango orchard. The investigation moved from allegations of gang-rape to honor killing to suicide.

== Reception ==
Parul Sehgal called the book "transfixing" with the "pacing and mood of a whodunit, but no clear reveal." She noted that Faleiro instead of pointing fingers at an individual, but "indicts something even more common, and in its own way far more pernicious: a culture of indifference that allowed for the neglect of the girls in life and in death." Kevin Canfield of Star Tribune called the book "powerful" and wrote: "Her social analysis is enlightening, but Faleiro's book is most poignant when it's focused on the girls' unfinished lives."

Amy Kazim of Financial Times wrote: "Taut with dramatic tension, The Good Girls vividly captures the sights, sounds, smells, preoccupations and oppressiveness of the village." A review carried by Kirkus Reviews called it a "modern-day Rashomon that offers multiple views of the widely publicized deaths of two young women in rural India." Aradhika Sharma of The Tribune wrote: "As insightful and feminist as it is deeply sympathetic, the book encourages conversations about freedom, misogyny and violence and about women being the sacrificial lambs at the altar of honour, morality and tradition."

Tunku Varadarajan described the novel as "riveting-sometimes astonishing-work of forensic journalism that chronicles the girls' lives as well as the circumstances of their death." He writes "What was certain is that Padma had been spotted in the field with Pappu. The investigators concluded that there had been no rape: The girls had killed themselves." He quotes “it had been over for Padma the moment she was found with a boy, her salwar [pants] at her ankles. And for Lalli, too, by association.” A reviewer from Publishers Weekly concluded: " In incisive prose, Faleiro, who offers no opinion on what actually happened, examines India's family honor system and the grueling lives of lower caste women." Hank Stephenson from Shelf Awareness called the novel "compulsively readable, highly impressive work" and an "excellent, deeply felt nonfiction." Nobel prize winner economist Abhijit Banerjee gave a positive review and wrote: "Despite its calm, measured tone, or more likely, because of it, The Good Girls left me shattered."
