= Quentin Bisch =

French perfumer

- Occupation: Perfumer
- Employer: Givaudan
- Known for: Good Girl, Delina, Guidance

Quentin Bisch is a French perfumer who works as a master perfumer for Givaudan. His compositions include Carolina Herrera's Good Girl, Parfums de Marly's Delina and Amouage's Guidance.

== Background ==
Bisch studied stage direction at university, taking a course that combined philosophy, sociology and art history over five years. He has described the training as central to how he approaches perfumery, comparing the construction of a fragrance to staging a play: "What you put on the stage has real meaning, and you need to choose carefully what you put on stage, how you light it, if you have music, if you have a voice or costumes."

== Career ==
Bisch has composed fragrances for houses including Jean Paul Gaultier, Chloé, Mugler, Carolina Herrera, Parfums de Marly, Balmain, Diptyque and Amouage; Whitewall put his output at more than 140 fragrances. Among them are Good Girl and La Bomba for Carolina Herrera, Delina for Parfums de Marly and Destin for Balmain.

His first composition for Amouage, Guidance, began with an open brief from the house's chief creative officer Renaud Salmon; Salmon has said it became the most successful fragrance in Amouage's history. Bisch also composed Amouage's Decision and Diptyque's Lazulio, both of which won prizes at the Fragrance Foundation France Annual Revelations in 2026.

Bisch has said he prefers to begin from "a white page" rather than respond to trends, noting that with roughly 3,000 fragrance launches a year it is impossible to keep track of what already exists, and that raw materials are often his starting point.

Salmon, who has commissioned several of his fragrances, described him as having "revolutionized modern perfumery writing over the past decade", producing work that is "emotionally immediate, technically sophisticated and culturally impactful".
