= Good Girls Don't (disambiguation) =

"Good Girls Don't" is a 1979 song by The Knack.

It may also refer to:

- Good Girls Don't (TV series), a 2004 sitcom created by Carsey-Werner-Mandabach
- Good Girls Don't..., a 1987 album by Finnish hard rock band Peer Günt

== See also ==
- Good Girls Don't Wear Trousers, 1989 novel by Lara Cardella
  - Volevo i pantaloni (film), 1990 (also known as Good Girls Don't Wear Trousers and I Wanted Pants)
