= Good Girl Gone Bad (disambiguation) =

Good Girl Gone Bad is a 2007 album by Rihanna, and its title track.

Good Girl Gone Bad may also refer to:

- Good Girl Gone Bad: Reloaded, the album's reissue
- Good Girl Gone Bad: The Remixes, a remix album by Rihanna
- Good Girl Gone Bad, a 1995 album by Mia X
- "Good Girl Gone Bad", a 2002 song by the Herbaliser from Something Wicked This Way Comes
- "Good Girl Gone Bad", a 1987 song by Kiss from Crazy Nights
- "Good Girl Gone Bad", a 1989 song by Stephanie Mills from Home
