= Good Girls: A Story and Study of Anorexia =

2023 book by Hadley Freeman

Good Girls: A story and study of anorexia
- Author: Hadley Freeman
- Publisher: Fourth Estate
- Publication date: 13 April 2023
- Publication place: United Kingdom
- Pages: 288
- ISBN: 978-0008322670

Good Girls: A Story and Study of Anorexia is a 2023 autobiographical memoir written by Hadley Freeman, and published by Fourth Estate for HarperCollins. The book explores Freeman's struggles with anorexia nervosa from ages 14 to 17, and subsequently with obsessive–compulsive disorder and addiction to cocaine. It was also published in the United States by Simon & Schuster. A paperback edition was published in April 2024.

== Reviews ==
Some reviews were positive. In The Guardian Fiona Sturges described the book as a "clear-eyed, sometimes upsetting but also bleakly funny account of this most slippery illness and what it feels like from the inside". Writing in The Times Suzanne O'Sullivan described how she "was struck throughout by the humility of the account and the responsibility she takes for her disorder". In The Jewish Chronicle Jennifer Lipman praised Freeman for her journalistic rigour which "[makes] this not just a misery memoir but an examination of the causes and consequences of anorexia", noting how the book "highlights important questions over the links between anorexia and autism, or anorexia and gender dysphoria as it presents in girls on the cusp of adolescence". Hannah Kuchler praised the book in the Financial Times, writing that "Freeman manages to turn this tragic and taxing tale into a gripping story, capturing an experience that many find hard to understand". In The Sunday Times Christina Patterson described how Hadley "draws a parallel with the huge rise in girls experiencing gender dysphoria" as both “are rooted in the belief that if you change your body, you will no longer hate yourself”, and concluded that "this is a book that’s intended to be useful — and it might even save some lives". In the Los Angeles Review of Books Catharine Morris noted links to Freeman's later career in fashion journalism and her view that "[fashion's] obsession with skinniness reflects how deeply the association between female self-denial and perfect femininity is entrenched in our culture", before summarising that "Freeman evokes the mental processes of anorexia extraordinarily well, and her candor will make a great many people feel less lonely". In The New York Times Casey Schwartz wrote that "Freeman seems to be aware of this pitfall. She has brought to bear every ounce of her trademark clarity, precision and wit to render her own experience, and that of other women with anorexia, with the utmost specificity and sensitivity". In the same issue Pamela Paul interviewed Freeman about her "riveting new memoir". Reviewing for The Spectator Leaf Arbuthnot described the book as "engaging, intelligent and occasionally funny, written with the author’s characteristic clarity" and as having "a solid redemption narrative to cling to". In The Wall Street Journal Sally Satel wrote that "Though there is no shortage of memoirs about anorexia, the sharp storytelling, solid research and gentle humor in 'Good Girls' make it especially appealing". In the Toronto Star Heather Mallick commended Freeman for her "precise and questing mind" and for her "willingness to dig out complications that lazier journalists miss". Writing for the Canadian Jewish News, Phoebe Maltz Bovy commended Freeman's "characteristically engaging style" adding that "Good Girls is [a] rare study-citing, professor-interviewing non-fiction book that never feels like a homework assignment". The book was selected by Alex Peake-Tomkinson for the Evening Standard as one of her Spring Reads 2023, and by Laura Hackett and Susie Goldsbrough for The Times's list of best non-fiction books in early 2023.

Other reviews were more mixed. In The Observer Kate Kellaway wrote that "at times there is an oddity about this book, a curious sense of separation between the suffering younger self and the aloof older self", but concluded that "Freeman is a brave, illuminating and meticulous reporter, and uses her experience wisely". The article was subsequently republished online by The Guardian. For the New Statesman Megan Nolan wrote that "Freeman is very good on the incoherent rage that sick teenage girls feel toward their mothers" but that "The problem with Good Girls as a whole is the attempt to provide a thesis rather than allowing the subjective account to stand alone". In The Irish Times Sarah Moss commended Freeman's account as "vivid, rich in the detail of hospital routines and privations", but criticised the book for being "dismissive of the kind of disordered eating that only ruins women’s lives rather than threatening them". She concluded that "Freeman’s powerful announcements of her recovery are counterbalanced if not undermined by these flashes of something uncomfortably like pride and even nostalgia, which could be interesting literary ambivalence if the material weren’t so dangerous to some of its intended readers". Reviewing for The Daily Telegraph Emma Seaber commended Freeman for a compelling personal account, but sharply criticised the book as "[following] a well-trodden path to an intellectual dead-end" and "[containing] numerous errors", including "gross distortions". In a review for Undark Magazine Frieda Klotz placed the book in a wider context of previous views on anorexia, writing that "Freeman’s book brings to the genre a blend of humor, humanity, and reporting driven by a very personal curiosity" before concluding that "even experience cannot fully illuminate the condition".

Writing in The Critic Victoria Smith reviewed both Freeman's book and other reviews of it. She notes that "most of the responses to Freeman's book have been extremely, deservedly positive" but that "I have noticed some claims that her failure to end it neatly, showing instead the ups and downs of the post-anorexia years, the raggedness of trying to catch up on an adolescence already missed, render the story itself flawed". Smith recounts her own experience of anorexia and supports Freeman's approach: "That isn’t how we live and grow as social beings. We cannot exchange one trap for another, telling ourselves that this trap is healthy, the other, sick." Smith also discusses criticisms of Freeman drawing comparisons between anorexia and gender dysphoria, concluding that "If critics of Good Girls want to claim neither anorexia nor gender dysphoria are political, they are doing a good job of demonstrating the opposite".
