= Ben Leonberg =

American film director, screenwriter, and producer

- Born: November 27, 1987 (age 38); Camden, New Jersey, US
- Occupations: Director; screenwriter; producer
- Years active: 2010–present
- Known for: Good Boy
- Website: www.benleonberg.com

Ben Curtis Leonberg (born November 27, 1987) is an American film director, screenwriter, and producer known for his work in the horror and fantasy genres. His work is characterized by the use of classical cinematic techniques with a contemporary focus.

== Early life and education ==
Born in Camden, New Jersey, to parents Curt and Lois Leonberg, and raised in Moorestown, New Jersey, Leonberg graduated from Moorestown High School in 2006, where he received area all-star honors for his cross country running. Leonberg attended the University of Massachusetts Amherst, where he competed on the UMass Minutemen cross country team.

Leonberg earned a Master of Fine Arts in Film Directing from Columbia University, where he also taught for several years. He has worked on short films, virtual reality projects, and commercial productions before making his feature debut.

== Career ==
He began his career in 2010 as an in-house director at Reebok LTD, where he created over 20 videos, including his first TV commercial, which aired during the 2011 Stanley Cup and was featured in Adweek. From 2012 to 2015, he studied at Columbia University’s Film program, earning an MFA in Directing. During this time, he made several short films, such as Bears Discover Fire and The Fisherman's Wife. Currently, Ben is the creative director at the virtual reality company YouVisit, where he helped establish YouVisit Studios. Beyond genre filmmaking, he explores storytelling through virtual reality.

Bears Discover Fire is a 14-minute short film directed by Leonberg that was filmed in 2015 in Bridgeton, New Jersey, as part of his MFA thesis at Columbia University. Based on Terry Bisson's 1990 sci-fi story, the film explores a surreal world where bears have learned to use fire, gathering around campfires on highway medians. Through the quiet journey focusing on a man, his elderly mother, and his nephew, the film reflects on aging, dignity, and human connection. Shot by Jan Reichle and funded with $15,000 raised via Kickstarter, it premiered at Dragon Con and won the Grand Prize at the KIN x DUST Sci-Fi Short Film Competition.

In 2016, Leonberg directed The Fisherman's Wife, a short horror film that premiered at the Columbia University Film Festival and was subsequently featured at the H.P. Lovecraft Film Festival in Portland and Providence. The ten-minute film centers on a woman named Becky who searches for her missing husband, a fisherman whose obsession with the sea leads to a confrontation with an ancient, unknowable entity. The film features tension and thematic alignment with Lovecraftian horror, emphasizing psychological unease and cosmic dread. Critics commented its visual style and narrative restraint, with HorrorNews.net noting its use of suggestion over explicit horror. Leonberg later discussed the film’s production and thematic continuity with his feature-length debut Good Boy in an interview with SAGindie, where he stated his interest horror storytelling and collaborative filmmaking with producer Kari Fischer.

Leonberg wrote and directed Good Boy, a supernatural thriller told from the perspective of a dog named Indy. The film explores themes of loyalty, trauma, and perception, using a canine point of view to drive the narrative. It premiered at South by Southwest 2025 and received comments regarding originality and emotional depth. In an interview with IndieWire, Leonberg discussed the challenges of filming from a dog's perspective and the creative decisions behind the film's structure. He emphasized the importance of empathy and non-human storytelling in expanding cinematic language. Following its festival debut, Good Boy was acquired by Shudder, a streaming service specializing in horror and thriller content. The film was distributed in multiple territories, including North America, the UK, and Australia. In early 2025, Leonberg signed with Verve Ventures, a talent agency that represents filmmakers.

Leonberg is next set to direct Follow Mode for Temple Hill Entertainment, which will be shot entirely on drones. The film is currently being sold at the Cannes Film Festival. He has also been reported to direct Ankle Snatcher for Sony Pictures, based on a short story written by Grady Hendrix.

== Style and influences ==
Leonberg blends classical editing techniques with modern visual storytelling. He has cited influences such as Stanley Kubrick's The Shining and Soviet experimental cinema. His work often explores perception, memory, subjectivity, psychological and supernatural elements, blending horror with emotional realism. His use of unconventional perspectives and narrative structures has led to comparisons to filmmakers such as Ari Aster and Jennifer Kent.

The protagonist of Good Boy, Indy, is Leonberg's real-life dog. The director has explained that the project was inspired by the curiosity of what dogs perceive when they react to seemingly invisible stimuli. To achieve a desired performance, Leonberg and his wife lived on the set, which was a real house, during filming.

== Screenings ==
Good Boy premiered at the South by Southwest film festival in March 2025 and was screened at several international festivals, including the Overlook Film Festival and the Melbourne International Film Festival. The film has received comments on its narrative and emotional aspects.

== Notable works ==
- Good Boy (2025): A horror film told from the perspective of a dog named Indy. The film uses the Kuleshov effect to convey emotion through the dog's gaze and has been noted for its originality and technical execution.
- The Fisherman's Wife (2016): A fantasy short film with mythological elements.
- Bears Discover Fire (2015): A science fiction short based on the story by Terry Bisson.
