= Good Girl (fragrance) =

Fragrance by Carolina Herrera

Fragrance by Carolina Herrera
- Designed for: Women
- Released: 2016
- Label: Carolina Herrera
- Perfumer(s): Quentin Bisch
- Concentration: Eau de parfum

Good Girl is a fragrance released by the fashion house Carolina Herrera in 2016 under licence to the Spanish group Puig. Sold in a bottle shaped like a stiletto heel, it was the house's first new pillar fragrance since 2007, and went on to become the best-selling women's fragrance franchise in the world, overtaking Chanel's Chance.

== Composition and design ==
The eau de parfum is an ambery floral built on jasmine and roasted tonka bean. Quentin Bisch of Givaudan is among the perfumers credited with its composition.

The bottle is moulded in the shape of a stiletto heel. Carolina Herrera de Baez, the house's fragrance director, has said the concept came from her mother's view that mystery is an important feminine quality, and that the intended customer was "both elegant and a little bit naughty". The brand framed the fragrance around what it called the duality of women, launching it with the line "It's good to be bad".

== Launch ==
Good Girl was Carolina Herrera's first new pillar fragrance since 2007 and its largest launch in fourteen years. It was rolled out to 10,000 retail doors between July and September 2016, beginning in the Middle East, Latin America, Russia and Spain, with a United States launch to follow.

The campaign starred the model Karlie Kloss and was photographed by Mario Testino, appearing in print from launch and in a television commercial from September 2016. Global Cosmetics News reported that 85 per cent of the marketing budget went to traditional channels and 15 per cent to digital and social media, a split expected to shift towards digital for the American launch.

== Reception ==
Writing for Puck in February 2025, Rachel Strugatz reported that Good Girl had become the world's best-selling women's perfume franchise, displacing Chanel's Chance — an unusual outcome in a luxury fragrance market long dominated by Chanel, Dior and Yves Saint Laurent — and attributed the result in part to Puig's use of social media marketing.
