= Amouage =

International luxury fragrance brand

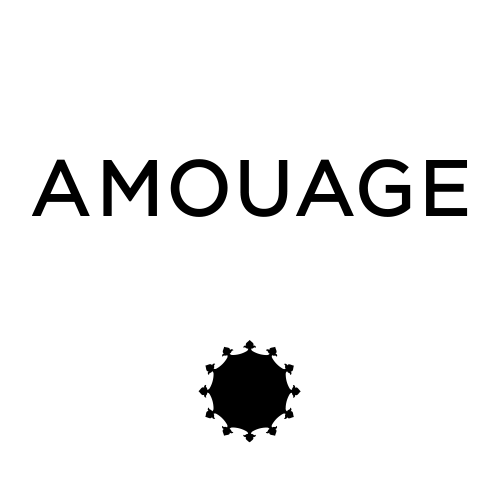

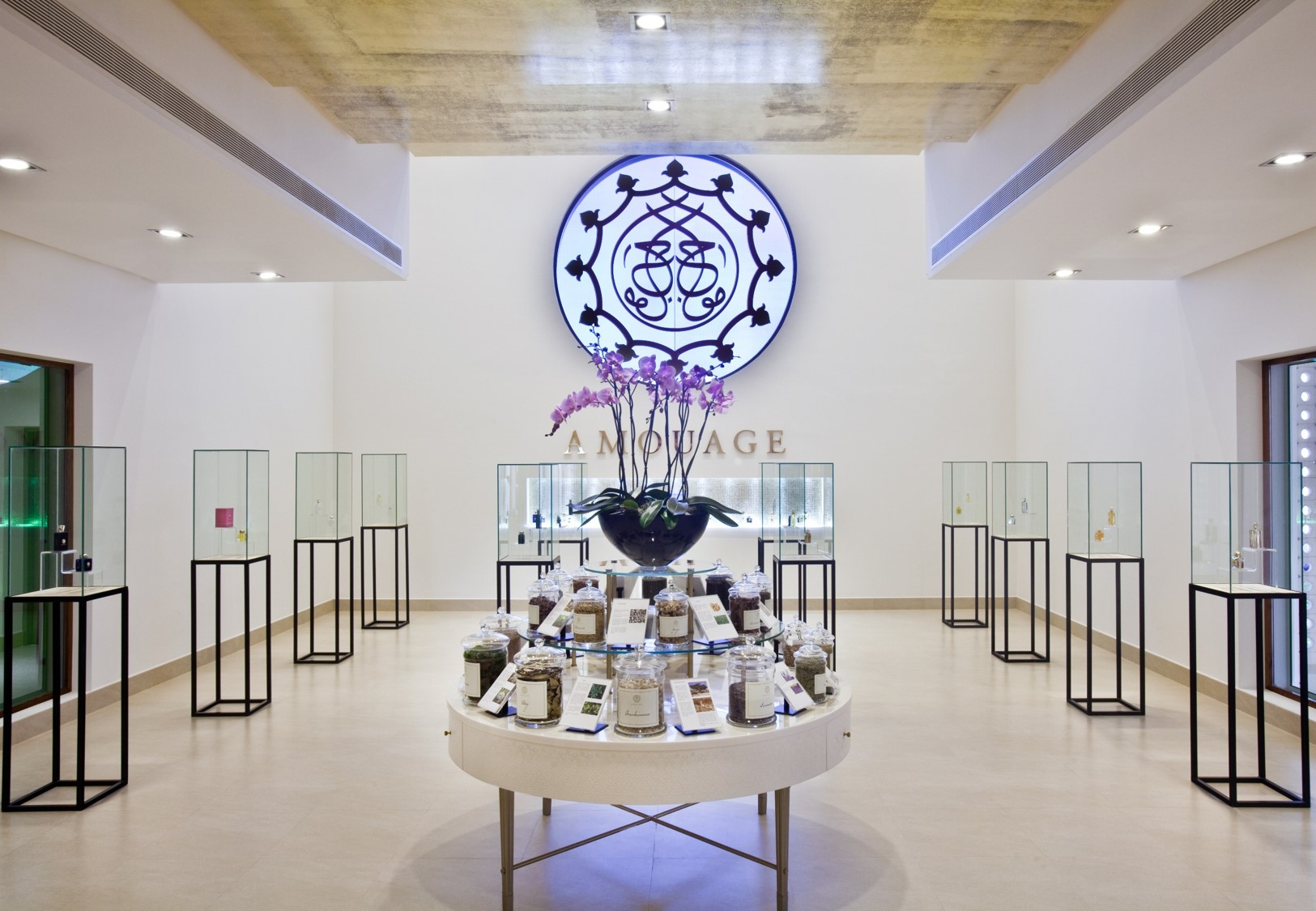
- Amouage Factory & Visitors' Centre
- Type: Brand
- Industry: Perfume industry
- Founded: 1983; 43 years ago
- Founder: Prince Sayyid Hamad bin Hamoud Al Busaidi
- Headquarters: Muscat, Oman
- Area served: Worldwide
- Products: Perfumes and luxury goods
- Parent: Oman Perfumery LLC
- Website: Official website

Amouage is an Omani niche fragrance brand founded in 1983 and operated by the Oman Perfumery LLC, a subsidiary of the Omani SABCO Group.

== History ==
The company was founded, at the request of Sultan Qaboos bin Said al Said, in 1983 in Muscat, Oman by Prince Sayyid Hamad bin Hamoud Al Busaidi.

In 2006, David Crickmore was appointed CEO. Christopher Chong was the creative director. Crickmore and Chong resigned in 2019. In 2025, Renaud Salmon became the creative director of Amouage.

In recent years, Amouage has expanded its range to include bath, home and leather goods. The cap of the women's fragrance bottles is made in the form of the dome of the Sultan Qaboos Grand Mosque, while the men's one replicates the handle of the ceremonial Kanjar dagger, which is the national symbol of Oman.

In July 2025, Amouage became the first beauty and Middle Eastern brand to join the Aura Blockchain Consortium, a Swiss non-profit founded by LVMH, Prada Group, Cartier, and OTB Group. The partnership introduced a Digital Product Passport for fragrances, allowing customers to verify authenticity and access digital ownership certificates via blockchain.

== Locations and manufacturing ==
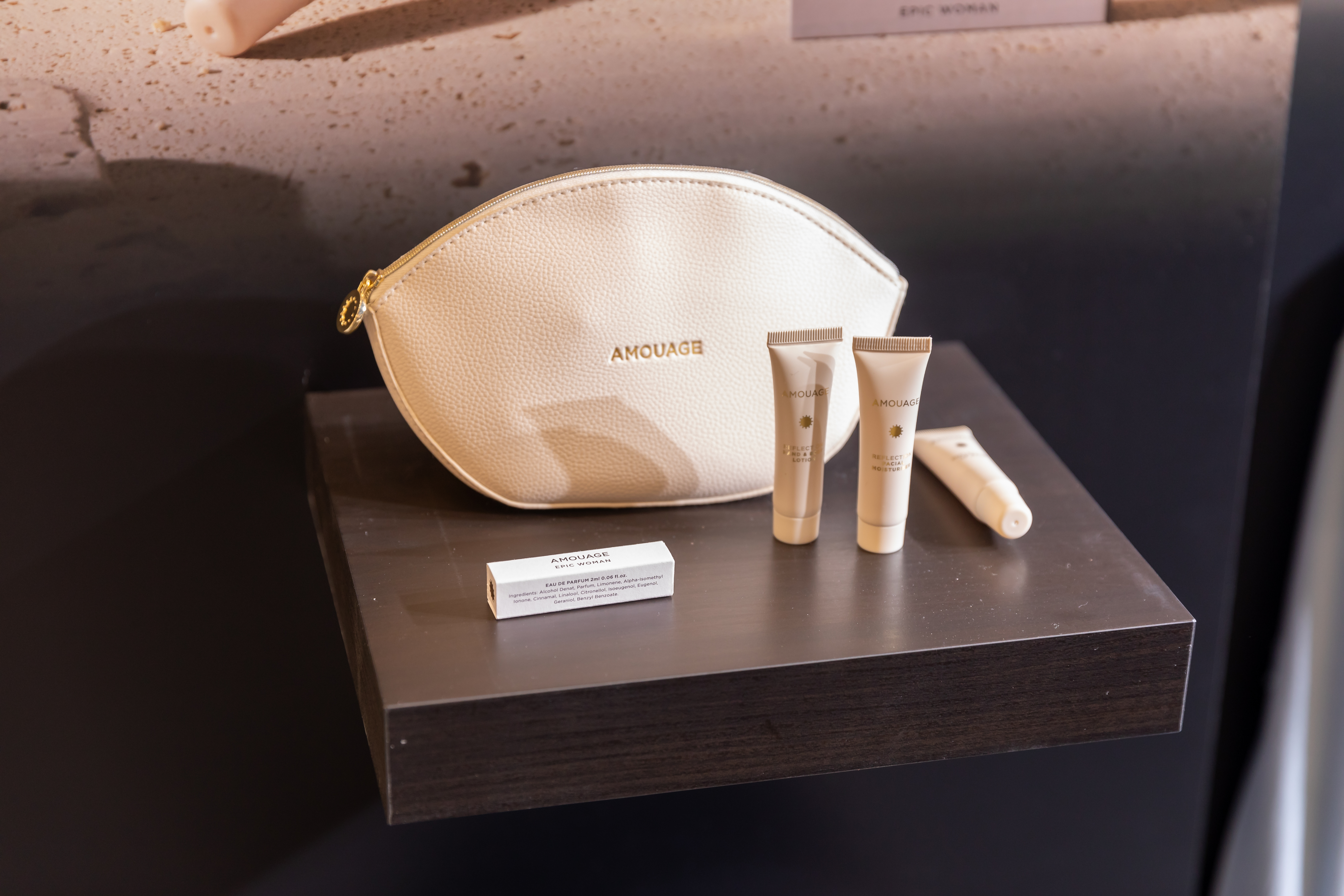
Airline amenity kit by Amouage

There are 21 standalone Amouage shops, and their products are sold in department stores around the world.

Amouage’s factory is located in Muscat and has the capacity to produce approximately 25,000 bottles a week. The two-storey building opened in December 2012 and is open to visitors and has a dedicated visitors centre.

In April 2022, the perfume house opened a store at the Mall of Oman, followed by another at the Dubai Mall in September 2023. In February 2024, it expanded to America.
