= Nova Scotia Duck Tolling Retriever =

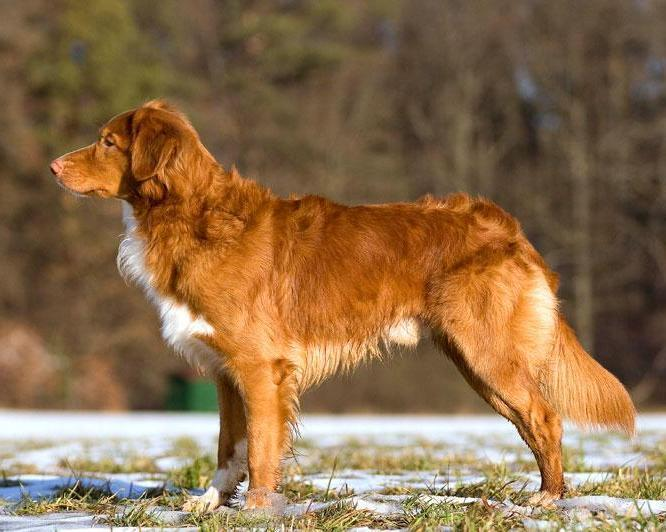
- Other names: Yarmouth Toller, Tolling Retriever, Little Red Duck Dog, Little River Duck Dog
- Common nicknames: Toller, Duck Toller
- Origin: Canada (Nova Scotia)
Traits
Height	Males	48–51 cm (19–20 in)
	Females	45–48 cm (18–19 in)
Weight	Males	20–23 kg (44–51 lb)
	Females	17–20 kg (37–44 lb)
- Coat: Medium-length coat with a softer, dense undercoat
- Colour: Varying shades of red or orange, with white on the chest, feet, and on top of the nose
- Litter size: 6–10 pups
Kennel club standards
- Canadian Kennel Club: standard
- Fédération Cynologique Internationale: standard
- Notes: Provincial dog of Nova Scotia

The Nova Scotia Duck Tolling Retriever is a medium-sized gun dog bred primarily for hunting. It is often referred to as a "toller". It is the smallest of the retrievers, and is often mistaken for a small Golden Retriever. Tollers are intelligent, eager to please, alert, and energetic. The toller also has webbed feet. The name "toller" is derived from their ability to lure waterfowl within gunshot range. The dog goes up to the water's edge and attracts the ducks so the hunter can shoot them. Then they go to retrieve the duck from the water. The breed originated in Yarmouth County, Nova Scotia, Canada. The American Kennel Club ranks the toller as the 69th most popular dog breed.

== History ==
The breed was developed in the Acadian community of Little River Harbour in Yarmouth County, Nova Scotia around the beginning of the 19th century. The toller was originally referred to as the Little River Duck Dog before being officially recognized by the Canadian Kennel Club in 1945 as a purebred dog. The toller is a mixture of retriever, spaniel, setter, and possibly a farm collie mongrel, although the latter has yet to be confirmed. The breed was perfected in the second half of the 19th century.

The breed gained national recognition in 1980 and was declared the provincial dog of Nova Scotia in 1995, when two Nova Scotia Duck Tolling Retrievers were awarded Best in Show at championship events that included many breeds.

== Use in hunting ==
Tollers are named for their ability to entice or lure waterfowl within gunshot range, which is called "tolling". The hunter stays hidden in a blind and sends the dog out to romp and play near the water, usually by tossing a ball or stick to be retrieved. The dog's appearance is similar to that of a fox. Its unusual activity and white markings pique the curiosity of ducks and geese, which swim over to investigate.

When the birds are close, the hunter calls the dog back to the blind, then rises, putting the birds to flight and allowing themselves a shot. The toller then retrieves any downed birds. They are particularly suited for retrieving in cold water climates because of their water-repellent double coat.

== Description ==
=== Appearance ===
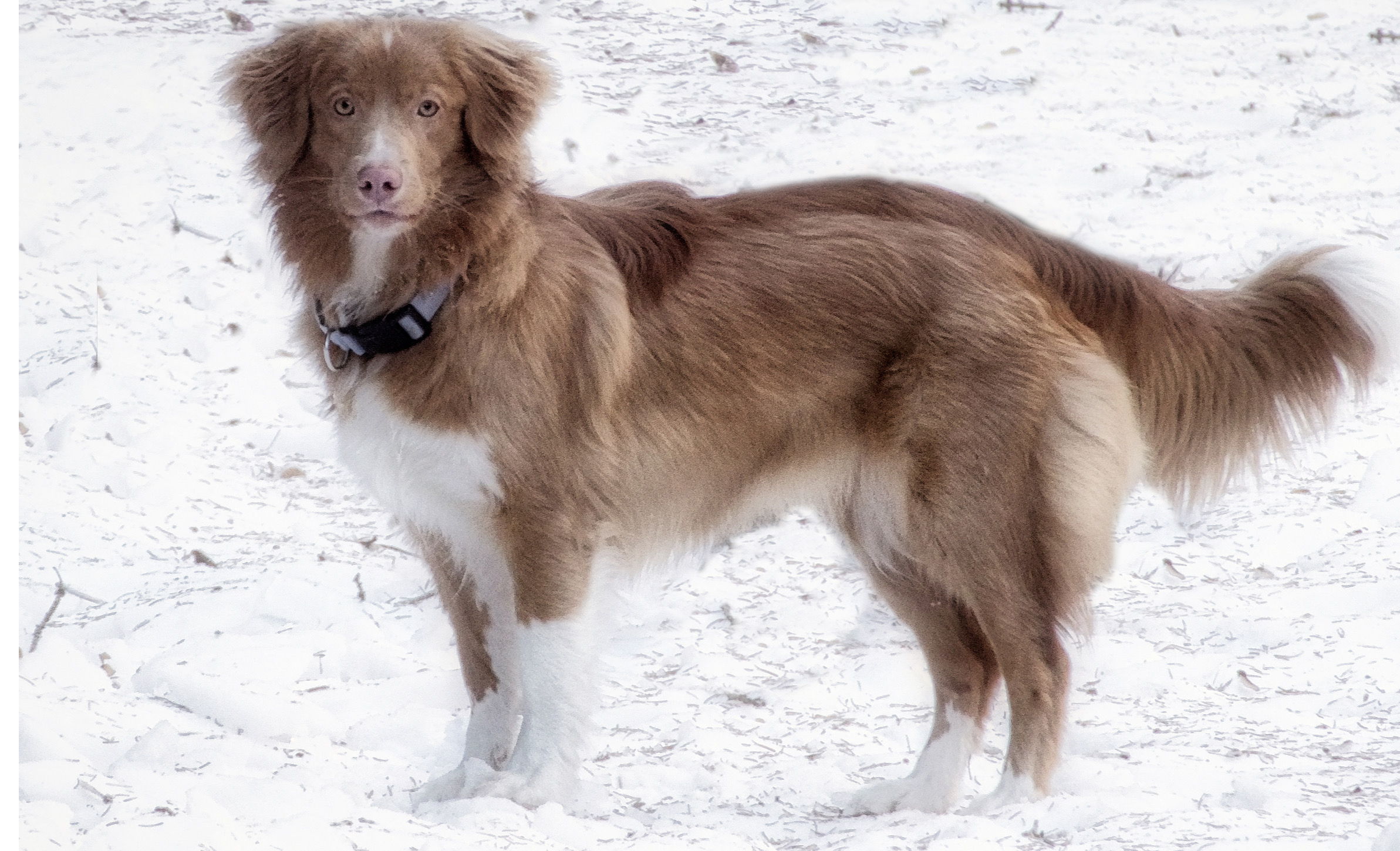
Dark coppery coloured Toller in profile showing the significant feathering on the legs of lighter colour and the long, bushy tail

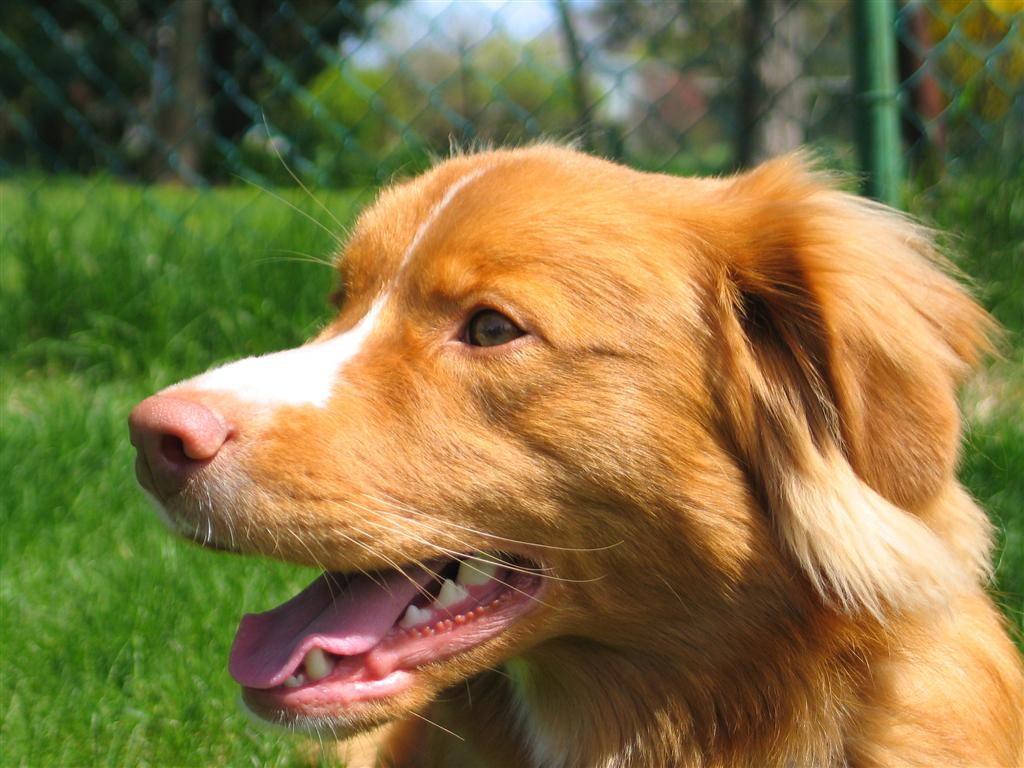
Toller’s head showing the rich orange coat colour and "foxy" head shape that are desirable for the breed

Tollers are often mistaken for small Golden Retrievers, but the toller is more active, both physically and mentally. According to the breed standards, the toller is athletic, muscular, compact, medium to heavy boned, balanced and powerful. The toller's chest is deep. Conformation judges require tollers to be capable of tolling and physical faults that inhibit working ability are heavily penalized. They should be of moderate build, with a lack of substance or a heavy build being penalized by judges for detracting from the breed standard and athleticism. A toller's legs are sturdy and solid and they have webbed feet.

Tollers can be any shade of red ranging from a golden red through dark coppery red with lighter featherings on the underside of the tail, pantaloons, and body. The lighter shades of golden red are deeply pigmented and rich in colour. The Toller should not be buff, brown, or beige, though some buff and sable tollers do appear in breeding lines.

It is common for a toller to have at least one of the following white markings: tip of tail, feet (not extending above the pasterns), and chest. Lack of white is not a fault as tollers can be born without white markings. Dogs with white on the shoulders, around ears, back of neck, across back or flanks, or with silvery, grey or black areas in coat are disqualified from conformation shows.

The toller was bred to retrieve from icy waters and must have a water-repellent double coat of medium length and softness and a soft dense undercoat. The coat may have a slight wave on the back but is otherwise straight. Some winter coats may form a long loose curl at the throat. Featherings are soft and moderate in length. The tail is well feathered and held jauntily when the dog is excited or moving. The hair on the muzzle is short and fine. Seasonal shedding is to be expected.

Those who breed Tollers for conformation shows consider the head (clean cut, slightly wedge-shaped) to be an important feature and believe it should resemble that of a fox and must never be blocky like that of a golden retriever. The ears are triangular and set high and well back from the skull. The pigment on a toller's nose, lips, and eye rims should match, appearing either black (which normally fades with age) or liver, blending into the coat. Lips fit fairly tightly around the mouth. The correct bite is a scissor bite with full dentition required. A toller's jaws are strong enough to carry a large bird but they must have a soft mouth, too. Eyes are set well apart, almond shaped, and medium-sized and amber to dark brown in colour. Expression is friendly, alert, and intelligent.

=== Size and proportions ===
Tollers are the smallest of all the retriever breeds. They range in height from 17–21 in (43–53 cm) at the withers, and weigh 30–50 lb (14–23 kg), with females being slightly shorter and lighter. Tollers are a medium-sized breed.

=== Temperament ===
Nova Scotia Duck Tolling Retrievers are known to be very intelligent, curious, alert, outgoing, and high-energy dogs. They are affectionate, eager to please, busy, and get along well with children. They are good family dogs. However, potential owners should be wary of the physical and mental commitment that is required in order to keep a toller busy. Physical stimulation should be provided for these dogs each day since they may become destructive when they are not exercised enough or are left alone for long periods of time.

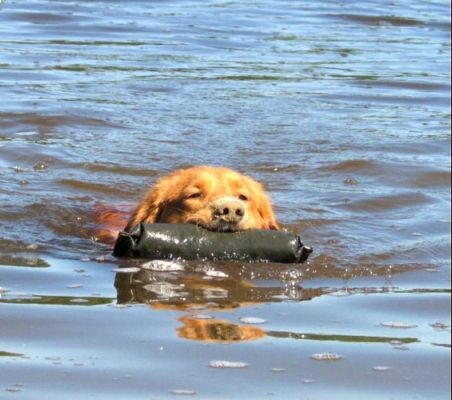
A Toller retrieving

Duck Tollers are working animals and are happiest when they have a job to do. Tollers are excellent hunting companions. They excel at many types of sporting competitions such as agility, dock diving, and obedience. Their keen sense of smell, intelligence, drive for work, and small size make them perfect search and rescue dogs. The breed standard states that the dog should have a strong retrieving drive, intense birdiness, endurance, and a love for water.

Tollers do not have an aggressive bark. Some have a unique sounding bark known as the "toller scream", which is a high-pitched howl-like sound which is often referred to as "singing". They do not use this bark in violent situations, rather; the "toller scream" is expressed when they are excited.

=== Socialization ===
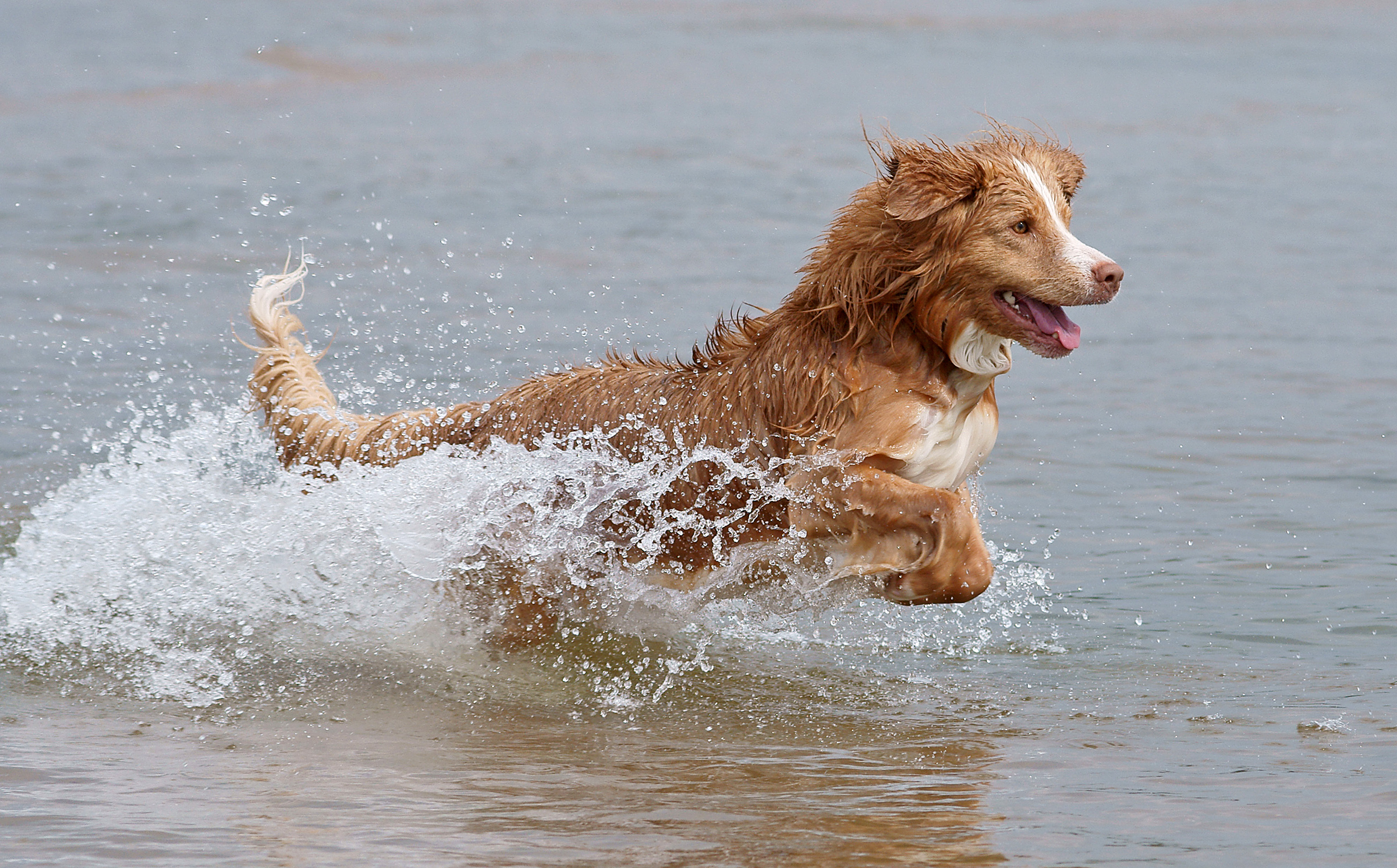
A Toller in water

Tollers have the capacity to be very social dogs as long as they are sufficiently socialized early on in life. While tollers are energetic and outgoing around their owners and family, their cautious nature makes them reserved around strangers. Exposure to new people, locations, smells, and sights are crucial to the healthy development of the toller breed. They tend to get along well with other dogs. However, they have a strong prey drive and may chase after cats or other small animals. Their prey drive can be avoided if cats, for example, are introduced early on in a toller's life. Failure to properly socialize tollers at a young age may result in aggressive, destructive, or timid behaviour in maturity.

== Health ==
A 2024 UK study found a life expectancy of 13.2 years from a sample of 47 deaths for the breed compared to an average of 12.7 for purebreeds and 12 for crossbreeds.

Tollers are generally hardy. However, like almost all dog breeds, certain genetic disorders are known to occur in the breed. This is sometimes blamed on a relatively small gene pool. The Finnish breed club states the largest health problems in the breed tend to be immunity related. They can be affected by eye problems and hip dysplasia and are predisposed to immune-mediated rheumatic disease and steroid-responsive meningitis–arthritis.

Progressive retinal atrophy (PRA) affects about 7% of Tollers with an estimated 40% being carriers. The type of PRA associated with the breed is known as progressive rod-cone degeneration. The disease causes cells in the retina to degenerate and die. This causes night blindness at first and eventually complete blindness. Collie eye anomaly is estimated to have a carrier rate of 5% and an affected rate of 0.5%. It generally only causes mildly impaired vision, although in more severe cases it can lead to retinal hemorrhaging and detachments resulting in blindness.

Thyroid problems have been identified by American breeders as a priority issue, together with epilepsy and hip dysplasia. As many as 1 in 6 Tollers may have autoimmune thyroiditis. Symptoms of thyroid problems includes weight gain, skin and hair problems including hair loss, weakness, cold intolerance or infertility.

Addison's disease affected 1% of Tollers in a health survey, an incidence rate 10 times more than the general dog population. Carrier rate is estimated at 18%. This disease is also considered an important issue in the breed. Signs include lethargy, decreased appetite, vomiting, weakness, diarrhea, increased drinking and urination, and shivering.

Aseptic meningitis (sometimes called steroid-responsive meningitis) has been diagnosed in increasing numbers in the Norwegian Toller population in recent years. Symptoms include intensive neck pain, fever, and lethargy. Prevalence is estimated at 2.5% in the Norwegian population.

Health tests are available for both eye diseases and autoimmune thyroiditis. A test for Addison's disease is available but it is only for one form of the disease and there are other forms which also affect the breed. A test is also available for one form of cleft palate that is exclusive to Tollers. Early testing shows a carrier rate of about 15%.

A survey conducted in 2002 by the Canadian Nova Scotia Duck Tolling Retriever breed club to discover which diseases and conditions occur in the Toller population, involving owners of 1180 dogs worldwide, showed 73% reported in excellent health and a total of 7.5% reporting poor or bad health. 141 dogs (12%) were reported as deceased with the average age at death being 6.4 years. The most common cause of death was cancer, reported in 25% of deaths, with old age being the next most common at 9%.

A worldwide study of the Tollers' registration history in 17 countries shows that about 90% of the genetic diversity present in the founding population has been lost. Tollers born between 1999 and 2008 have an effective founder size of 9.8, realized effective population size of 18 and an average inbreeding coefficient of 0.26. Breeders are working to prevent losing heterozygosity and to maintain sufficient genetic variations. High kinship value means the breed is not able to maintain a steady level of inbreeding in the long term.

== Activities ==
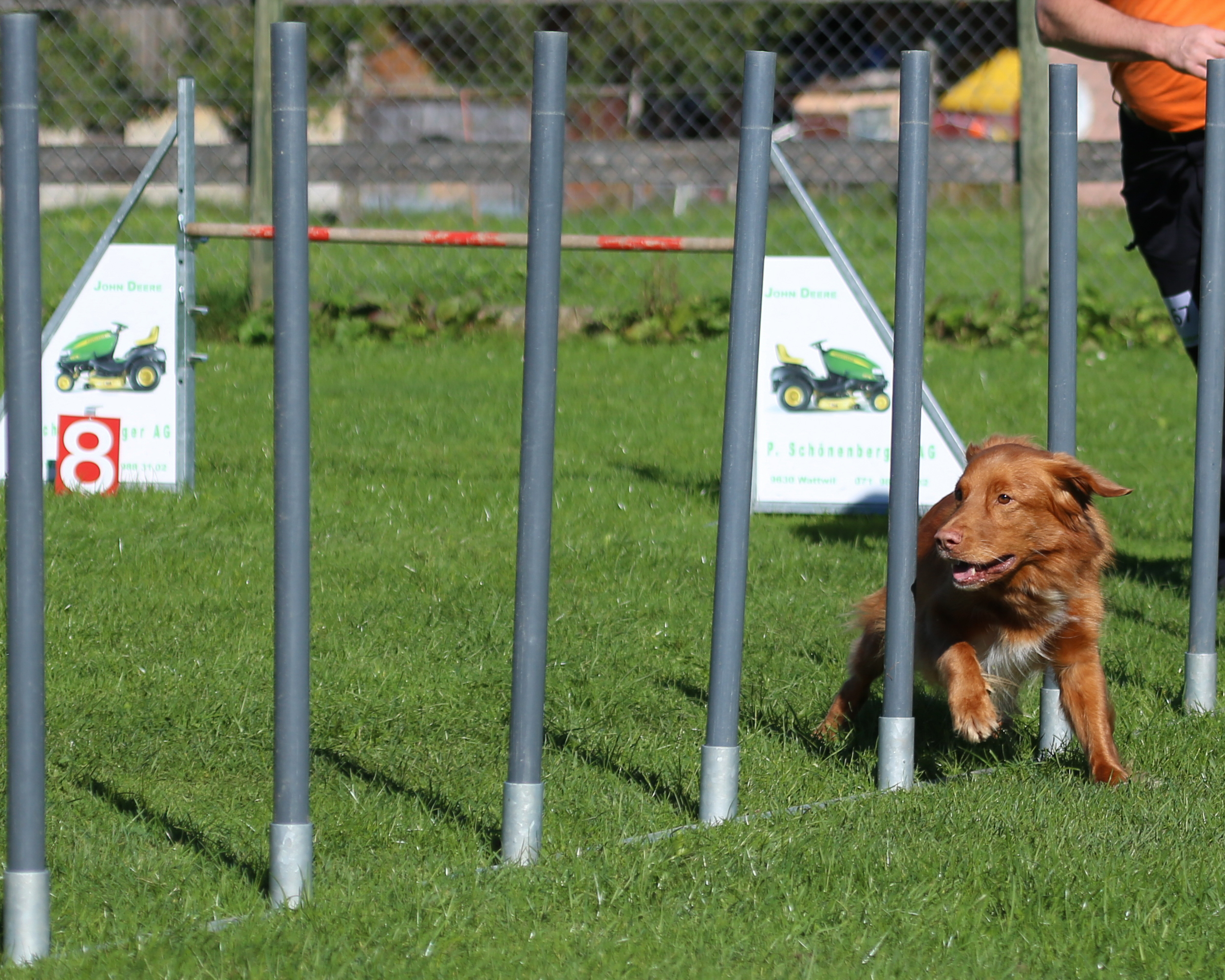
A Toller participating in an agility event

The Toller is known to excel in various sporting and obedience activities, and health and safety related jobs. The breeds' high energy and intelligence makes them perfect candidates for difficult jobs that require tremendous dedication and skill. Tollers enjoy working and being outside, therefore, it is no surprise that they excel at various sport and job related activities.

The breed is categorized as a "sporting" dog under the CKC and AKC organizations making tollers ideal dogs for various physical activities. Other kennel clubs such as the ANKC and UKC categorize tollers as a "gundog" which depicts their drive, mental intelligence, and intuitive hunting sense. Kennel clubs throughout the world recognize Tollers as an athletic, intelligent, and a driven breed that has the innate ability to excel in any of the following activities: dog agility, dock jumping, disc catching, flyball, lure coursing, obedience, search and rescue, therapy dog, and hunting.

== See also ==
- Kooikerhondje
- List of dog breeds
