= Austin Film Critics Association Awards 2025 =

Film awards ceremony

21st Austin Film Critics Association Awards
- Date: December 18, 2025
- Location: Austin, Texas
- Presented by: Austin Film Critics Association
- Website: austinfilmcritics.org

The 21st Austin Film Critics Association Awards, honoring the best in filmmaking for 2025, were announced on December 18, 2025. The nominations were announced on December 10, 2025.

== Expansion ==
The categories of Best Visual Effects and Best Remake / Franchise Film were introduced this year. The five recipients of the Robert R. "Bobby" McCurdy Memorial Breakthrough Award were announced with the winners of the rest of the categories.

== Statistics ==
Paul Thomas Anderson's action thriller One Battle After Another led the nominations with twelve, followed by Ryan Coogler's period supernatural horror film Sinners with eleven, and Frankenstein and Marty Supreme with eight each.

One Battle After Another received the most awards with five, including Best Film, followed by Sinners with three.

Indy the Dog, from the supernatural horror film Good Boy, received a special award "for a uniquely realized performance in the field of animal acting".

== Winners and nominees ==
The winners are listed first and in boldface.

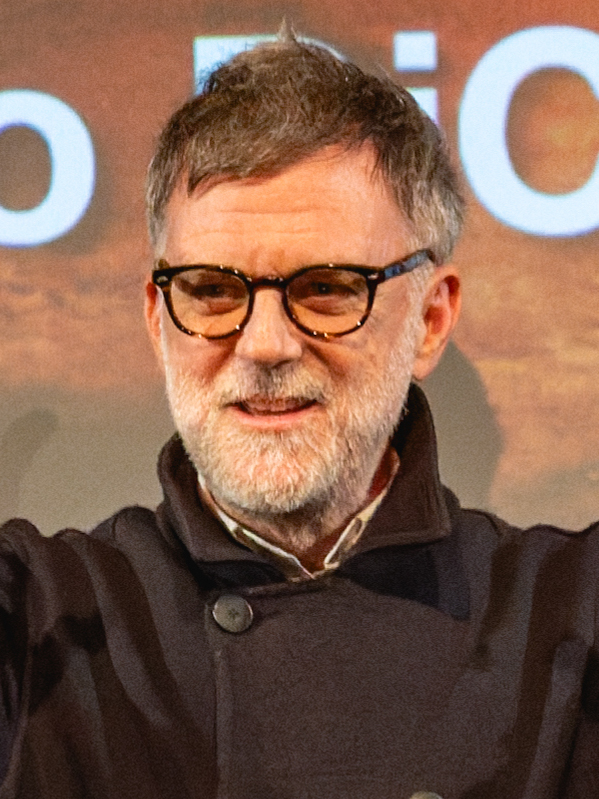
Paul Thomas Anderson, Best Director and Best Adapted Screenplay winner

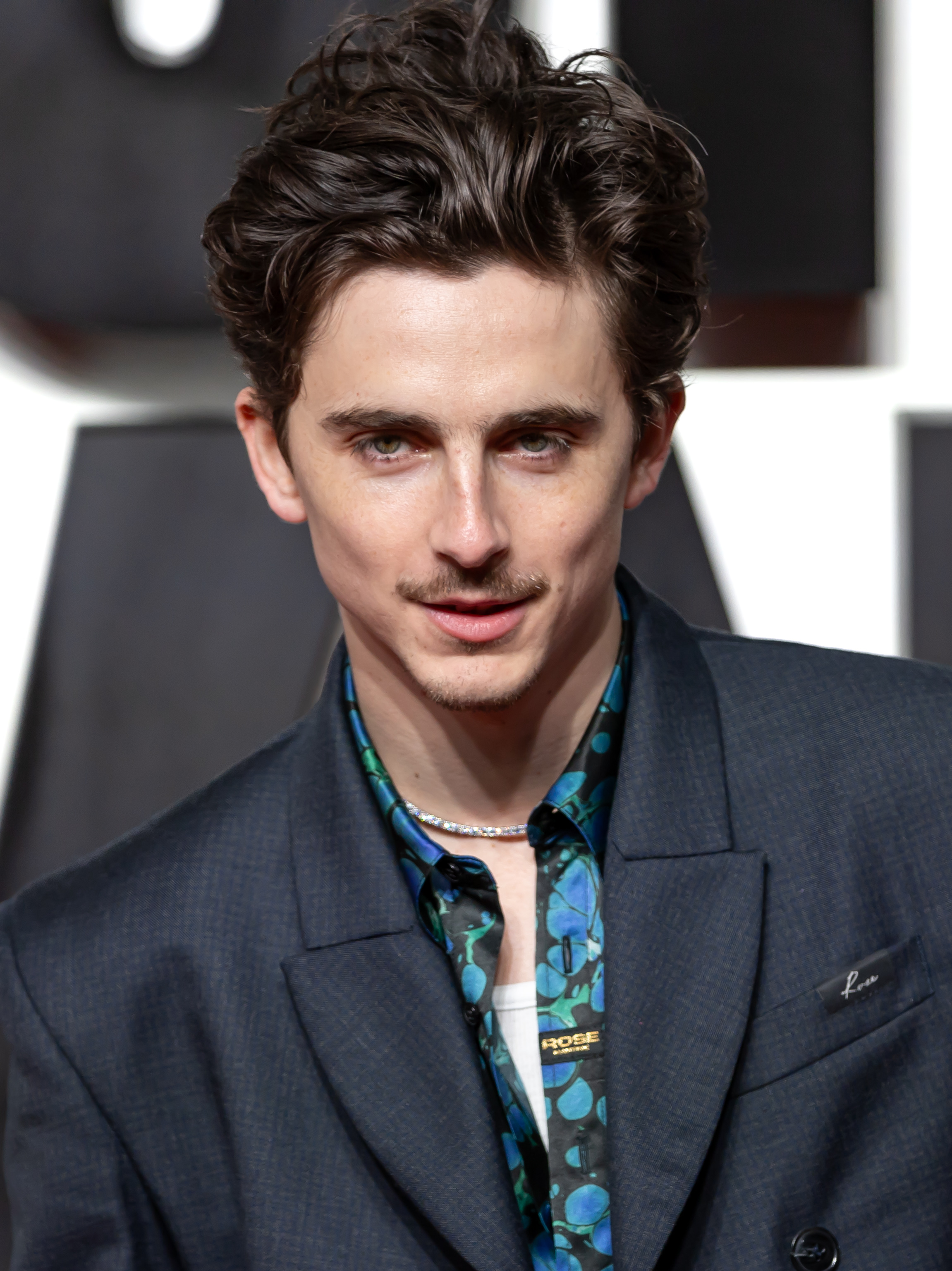
Timothée Chalamet, Best Actor winner

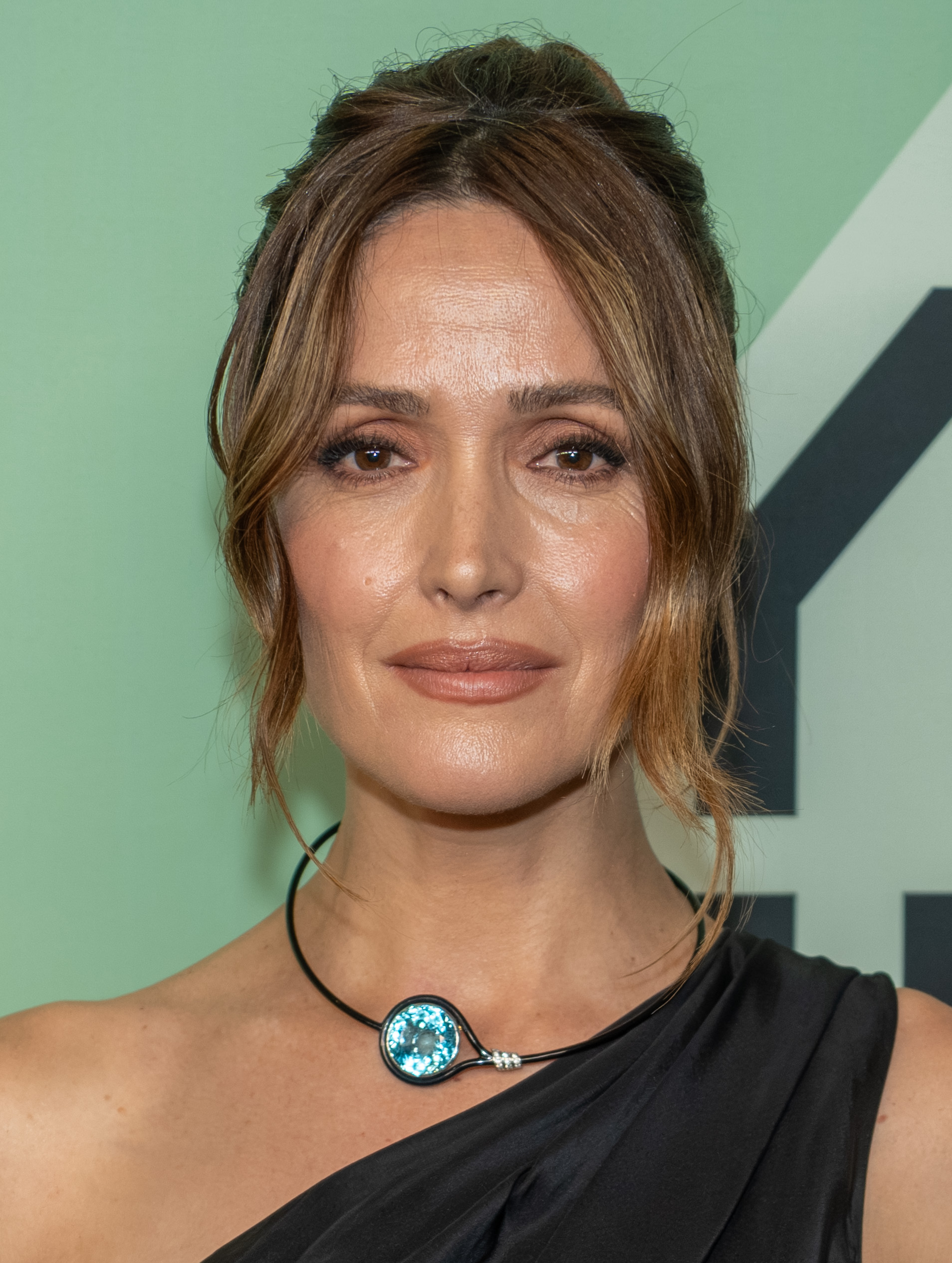
Rose Byrne, Best Actress winner

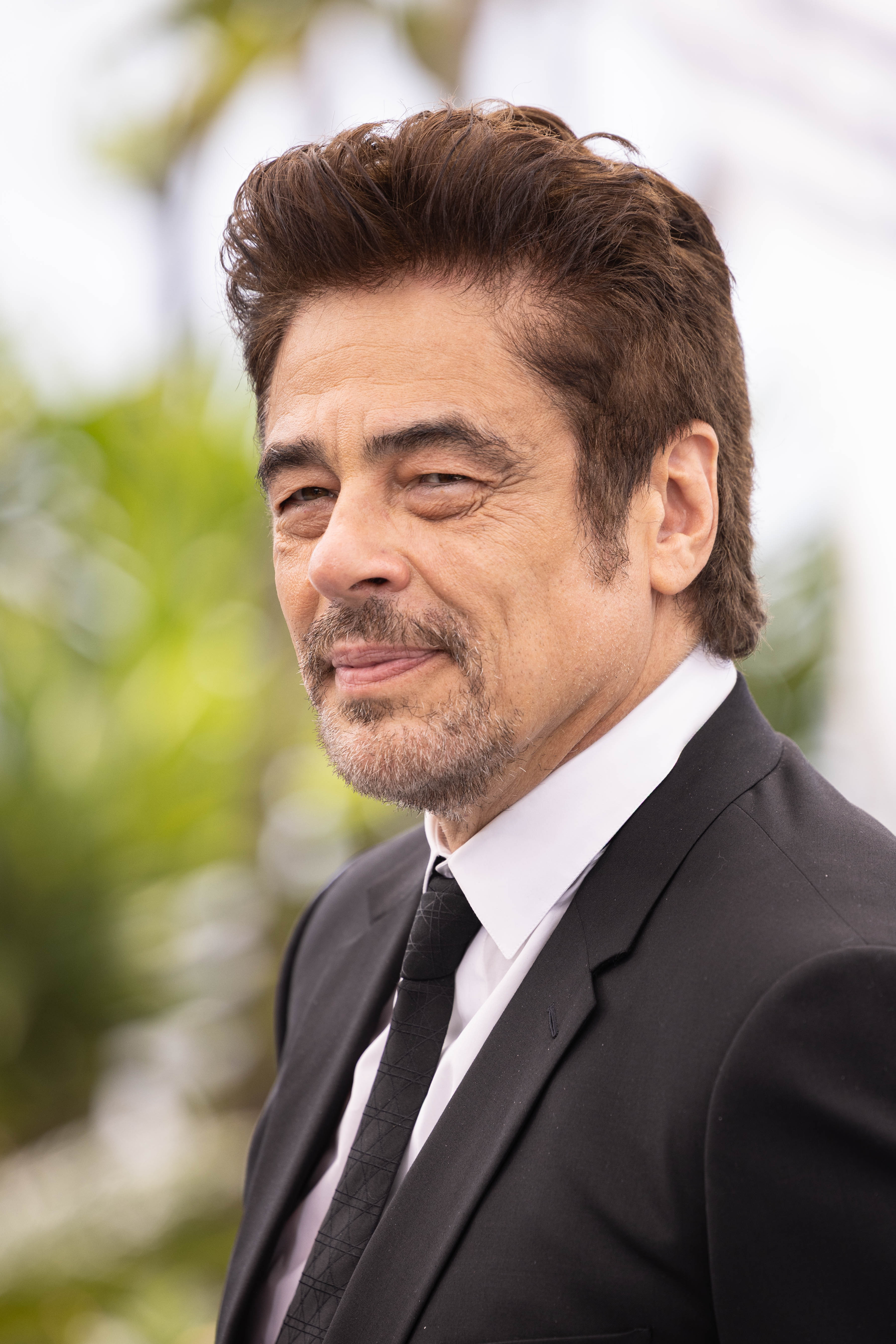
Benicio del Toro, Best Supporting Actor winner

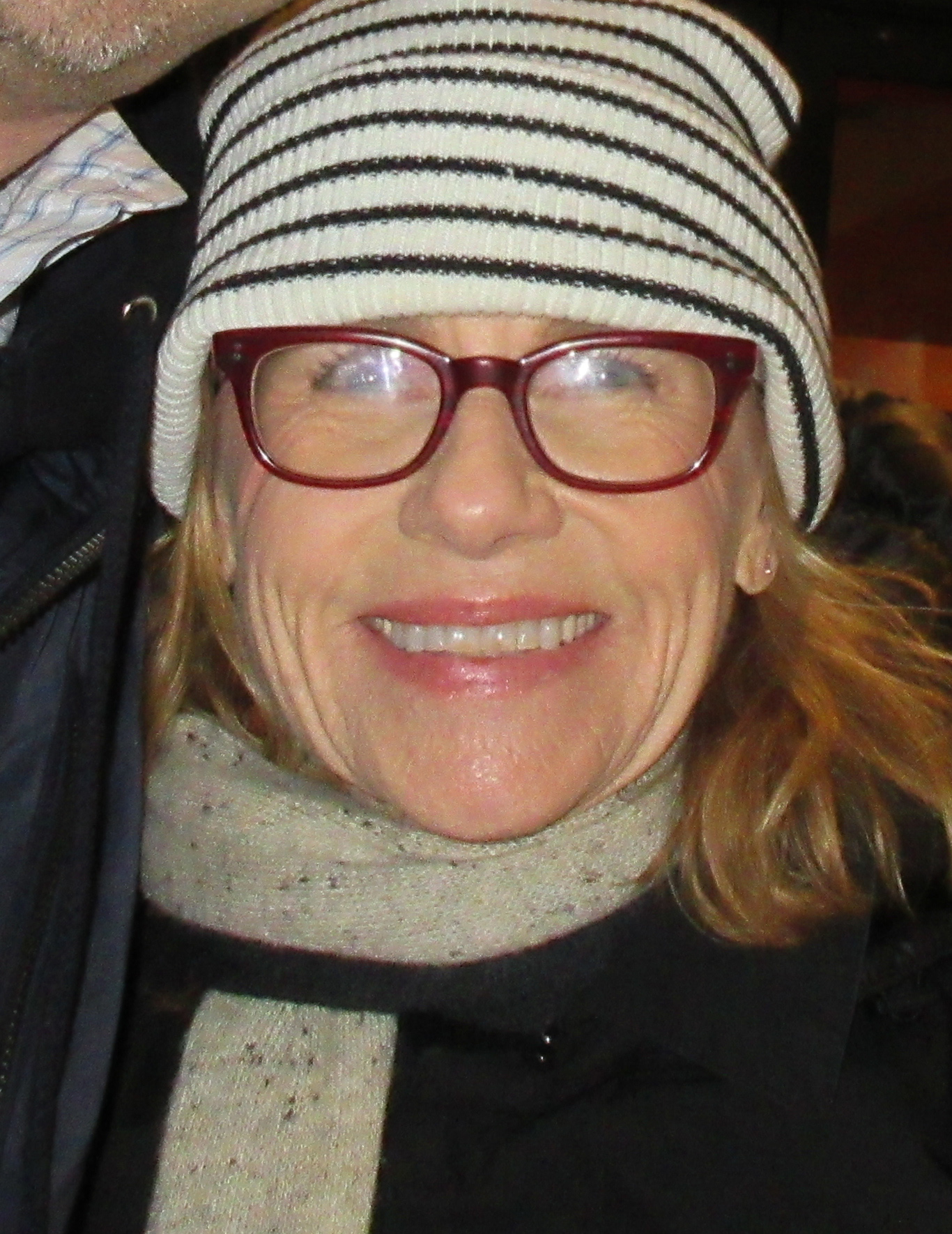
Amy Madigan, Best Supporting Actress winner

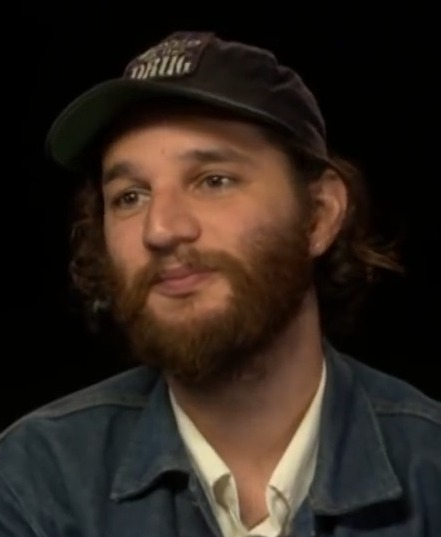
Josh Safdie, Best Original Screenplay co-winner

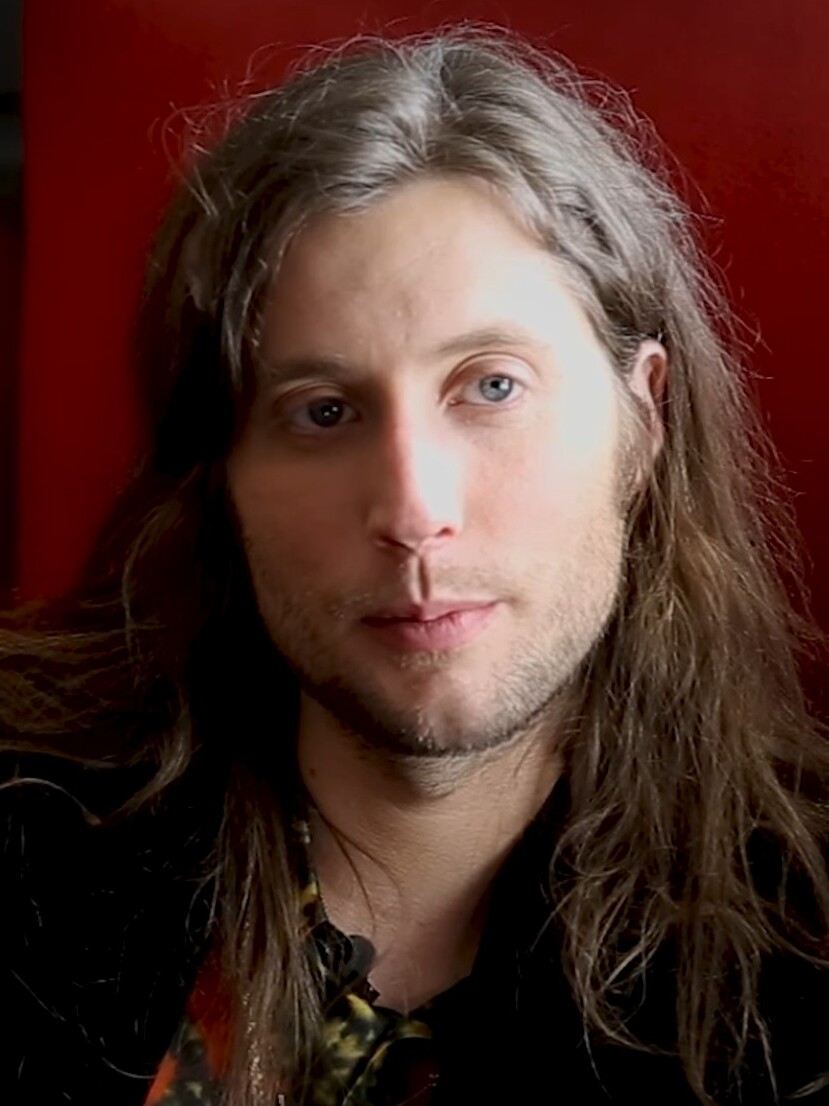
Ludwig Göransson, Best Original Score winner

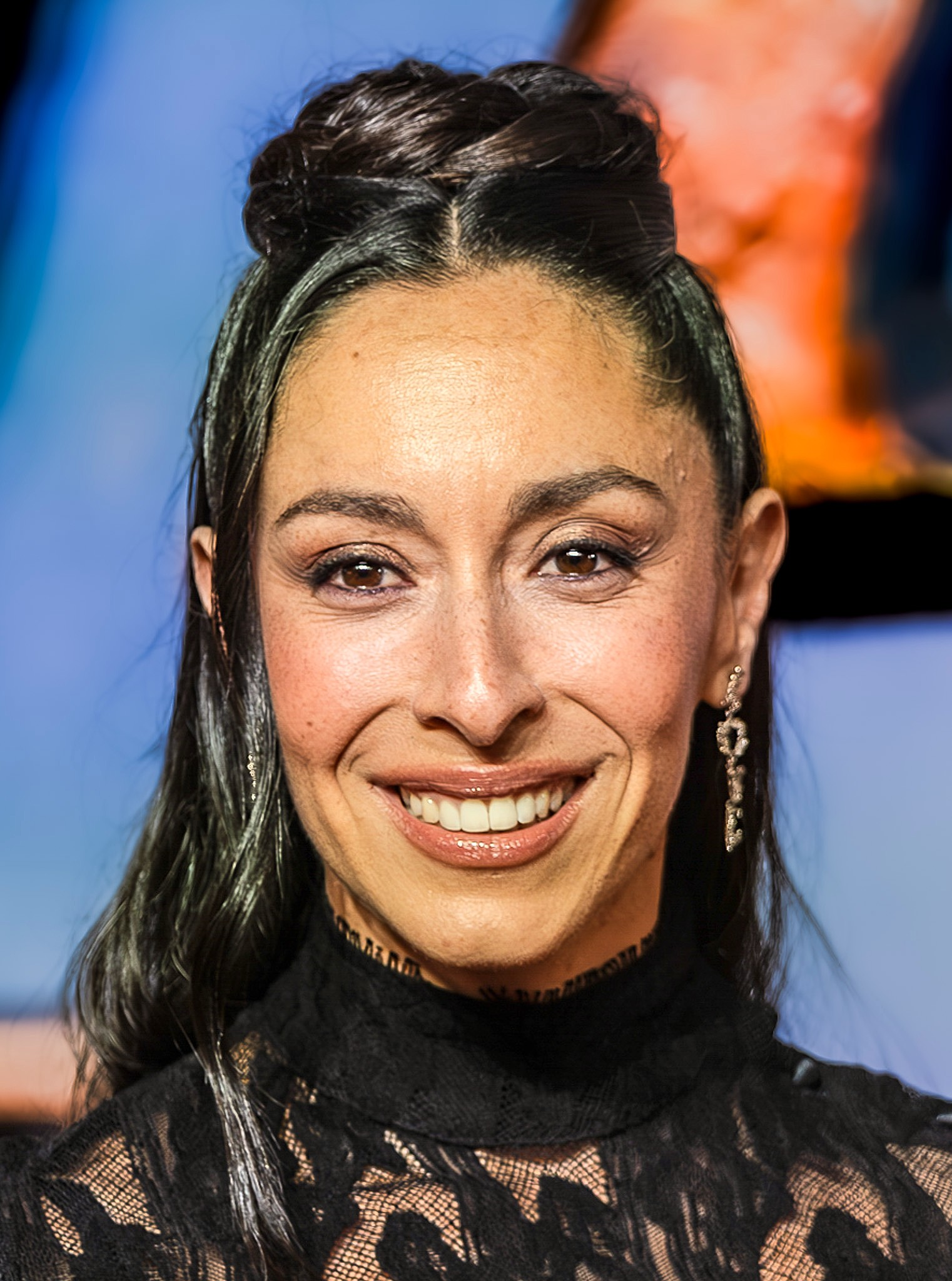
Oona Chaplin, Best Voice Acting/Animated/Digital Performance winner

Best Film	Best Director
1. **One Battle After Another**; 2. Sinners; 3. Marty Supreme; 4. Sentimental Value; 5. Weapons; 6. The Secret Agent; 7. The Testament of Ann Lee; 8. Frankenstein; 9. Train Dreams; 10. Bugonia	**Paul Thomas Anderson – One Battle After Another**; Ryan Coogler – Sinners; Guillermo del Toro – Frankenstein; Josh Safdie – Marty Supreme; Joachim Trier – Sentimental Value
Best Actor	Best Actress
**Timothée Chalamet – Marty Supreme as Marty Mauser**; Leonardo DiCaprio – One Battle After Another as Bob Ferguson; Ethan Hawke – Blue Moon as Lorenz Hart; Michael B. Jordan – Sinners as Elijah "Smoke" Moore / Elias "Stack" Moore; Wagner Moura – The Secret Agent as Marcelo Alves / Armando Solimões / Fernando Solimões	**Rose Byrne – If I Had Legs I'd Kick You as Linda**; Jessie Buckley – Hamnet as Agnes Shakespeare; Jennifer Lawrence – Die My Love as Grace; Amanda Seyfried – The Testament of Ann Lee as Ann Lee; Emma Stone – Bugonia as Michelle Fuller
Best Supporting Actor	Best Supporting Actress
**Benicio del Toro – One Battle After Another as Sensei Sergio St. Carlos**; Jacob Elordi – Frankenstein as The Creature; David Jonsson – The Long Walk as Peter "Pete" McVries; Sean Penn – One Battle After Another as Col. Steven J. Lockjaw; Adam Sandler – Jay Kelly as Ron Sukenick	**Amy Madigan – Weapons as Gladys**; Odessa A'zion – Marty Supreme as Rachel Mizler; Inga Ibsdotter Lilleaas – Sentimental Value as Agnes Borg Pettersen; Wunmi Mosaku – Sinners as Annie; Teyana Taylor – One Battle After Another as Perfidia Beverly Hills
Best Original Screenplay	Best Adapted Screenplay
**Marty Supreme – Ronald Bronstein and Josh Safdie**; The Secret Agent – Kleber Mendonça Filho; Sentimental Value – Eskil Vogt and Joachim Trier; Sinners – Ryan Coogler; Weapons – Zach Cregger	**One Battle After Another – Paul Thomas Anderson**; Bugonia – Will Tracy and Jang Joon-hwan; Frankenstein – Guillermo del Toro and Mary Shelley; No Other Choice – Park Chan-wook, Lee Kyoung-mi, Don McKellar, Lee Ja-hye, and Donald E. Westlake; Train Dreams – Clint Bentley, Greg Kwedar, and Denis Johnson
Best Animated Film	Best Documentary
**KPop Demon Hunters**; Arco; Elio; Little Amélie or the Character of Rain; Zootopia 2	**The Perfect Neighbor**; Come See Me in the Good Light; The Librarians; Orwell: 2+2=5; Predators
Best International Film	Best First Film
**The Secret Agent**; It Was Just an Accident; No Other Choice; Sentimental Value; Sirāt	**Sorry, Baby – Eva Victor**; The Chronology of Water – Kristen Stewart; Eephus – Carson Lund; Friendship – Andrew DeYoung; The Plague – Charlie Polinger
Best Cinematography	Best Editing
**Sinners – Autumn Durald Arkapaw**; Frankenstein – Dan Laustsen; Marty Supreme – Darius Khondji; One Battle After Another – Michael Bauman; Train Dreams – Adolpho Veloso	**One Battle After Another – Andy Jurgensen**; F1: The Movie – Stephen Mirrione; Marty Supreme – Ronald Bronstein and Josh Safdie; Sinners – Michael P. Shawver; Weapons – Joe Murphy
Best Original Score	Best Ensemble
**Sinners – Ludwig Göransson**; Frankenstein – Alexandre Desplat; One Battle After Another – Jonny Greenwood; The Testament of Ann Lee – Daniel Blumberg; Tron: Ares – Trent Reznor and Atticus Ross	**Sinners**; The Long Walk; Marty Supreme; One Battle After Another; Wake Up Dead Man: A Knives Out Mystery
Best Stunt Work	Best Voice Acting/Animated/Digital Performance
**Mission: Impossible – The Final Reckoning**; Ballerina; F1: The Movie; One Battle After Another; Sinners	**Oona Chaplin – Avatar: Fire and Ash as Varang**; Arden Cho / Ejae – KPop Demon Hunters as Rumi; Stephen Lang – Avatar: Fire and Ash as Colonel Miles Quaritch; Will Patton – Train Dreams as the narrator; Zoe Saldaña – Avatar: Fire and Ash as Neytiri
Best Visual Effects	Best Remake / Franchise Film
**Avatar: Fire and Ash**; F1: The Movie; Frankenstein; Sinners; Superman	**Wake Up Dead Man: A Knives Out Mystery**; 28 Years Later; Avatar: Fire and Ash; Frankenstein; Superman
The Robert R. "Bobby" McCurdy Memorial Breakthrough Award	Best Austin Film 2025
**Odessa A'zion – Marty Supreme**; **Miles Caton – Sinners**; **Chase Infiniti – One Battle After Another**; **Maggie Kang – KPop Demon Hunters**; **Eva Victor – Sorry, Baby**	**Blue Moon (dir. Richard Linklater)**; The American Southwest (dir. Ben Masters); Man Goes on Rant (dir. Peter Curtis Pardini); Nouvelle Vague (dir. Richard Linklater); The Toxic Avenger (dir. Macon Blair)
The Dual Threat Special Award
**Elle Fanning – Predator: Badlands**; **Theo James – The Monkey**; **Michael B. Jordan – Sinners**; **Diego Luna / Tonatiuh / Jennifer Lopez – Kiss of the Spider Woman**; **Dylan O'Brien – Twinless**; **Robert Pattinson – Mickey 17**; **Rosamund Pike / Matthew Rhys – Hallow Road**
