= Austin Film Critics Association Awards 2023 =

Film awards edition

19th Austin Film Critics Association Awards
- Date: January 10, 2024
- Location: Austin, Texas
- Presented by: Austin Film Critics Association
- Website: austinfilmcritics.org

The 19th Austin Film Critics Association Awards, honoring the best in filmmaking for 2023, were announced on January 10, 2024. The nominations were announced on January 3, 2024.

Killers of the Flower Moon and Oppenheimer led the nominations with ten each, followed by Poor Things with nine. Oppenheimer also received the most awards with eight wins, including Best Director; however, out of reach was Best Film, which went to Killers of the Flower Moon.

== Winners and nominees ==
The winners are listed first and in bold.

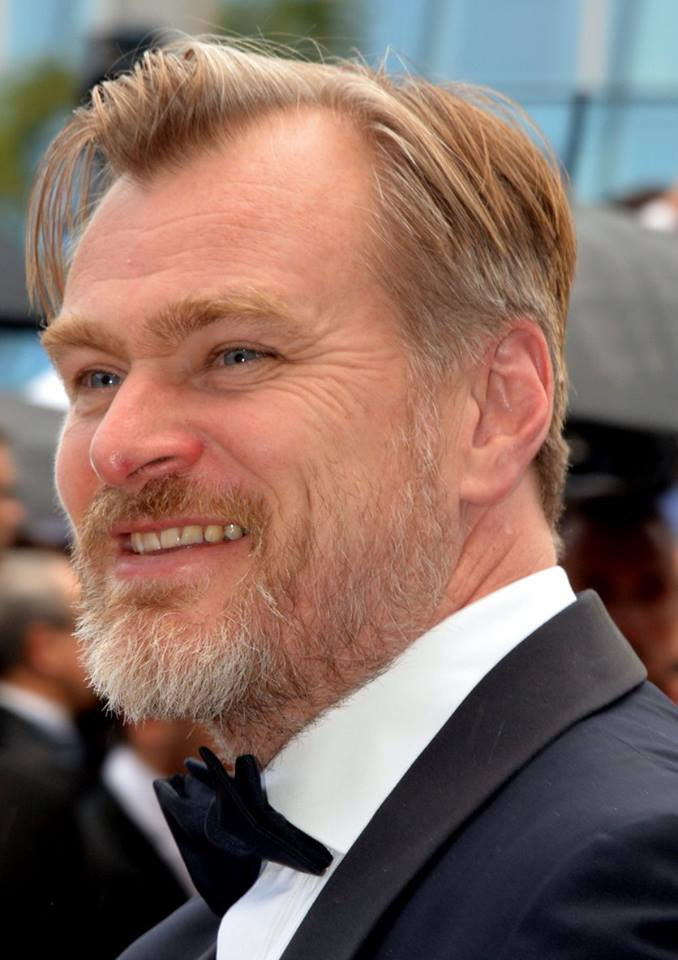
Christopher Nolan, Best Director and Best Adapted Screenplay winner

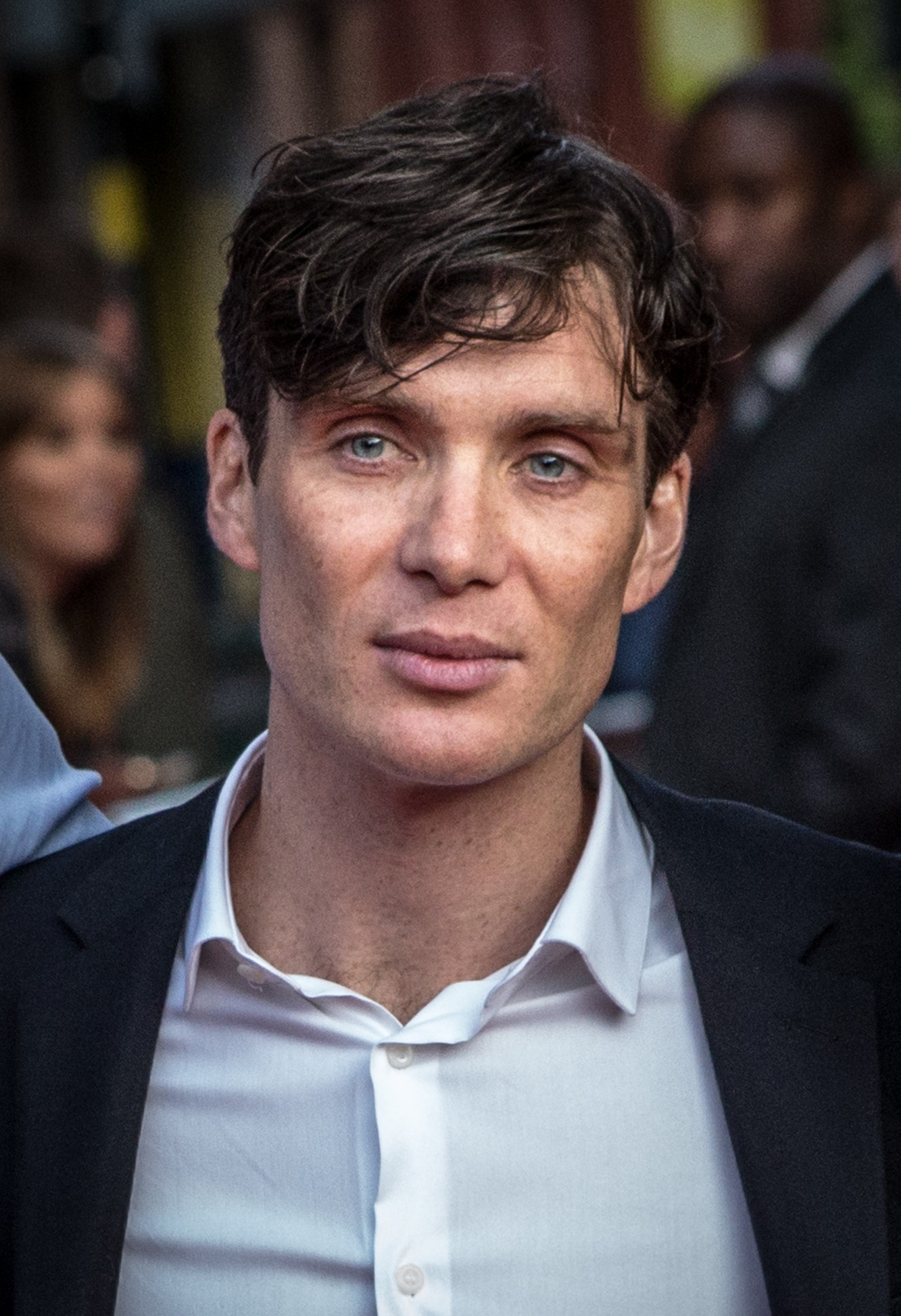
Cillian Murphy, Best Actor winner

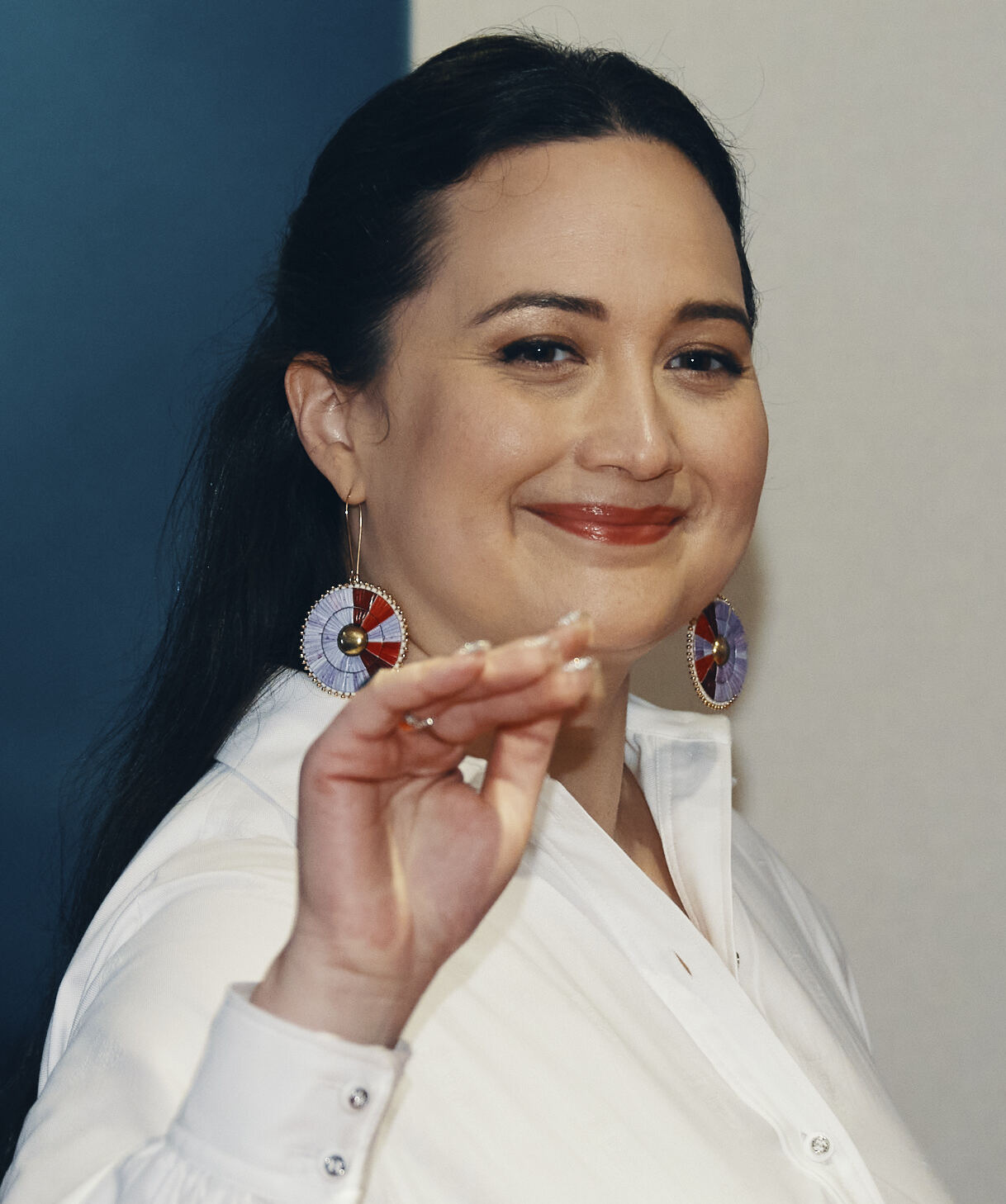
Lily Gladstone, Best Actress and The Robert R. "Bobby" McCurdy Memorial Breakthrough Artist Award winner

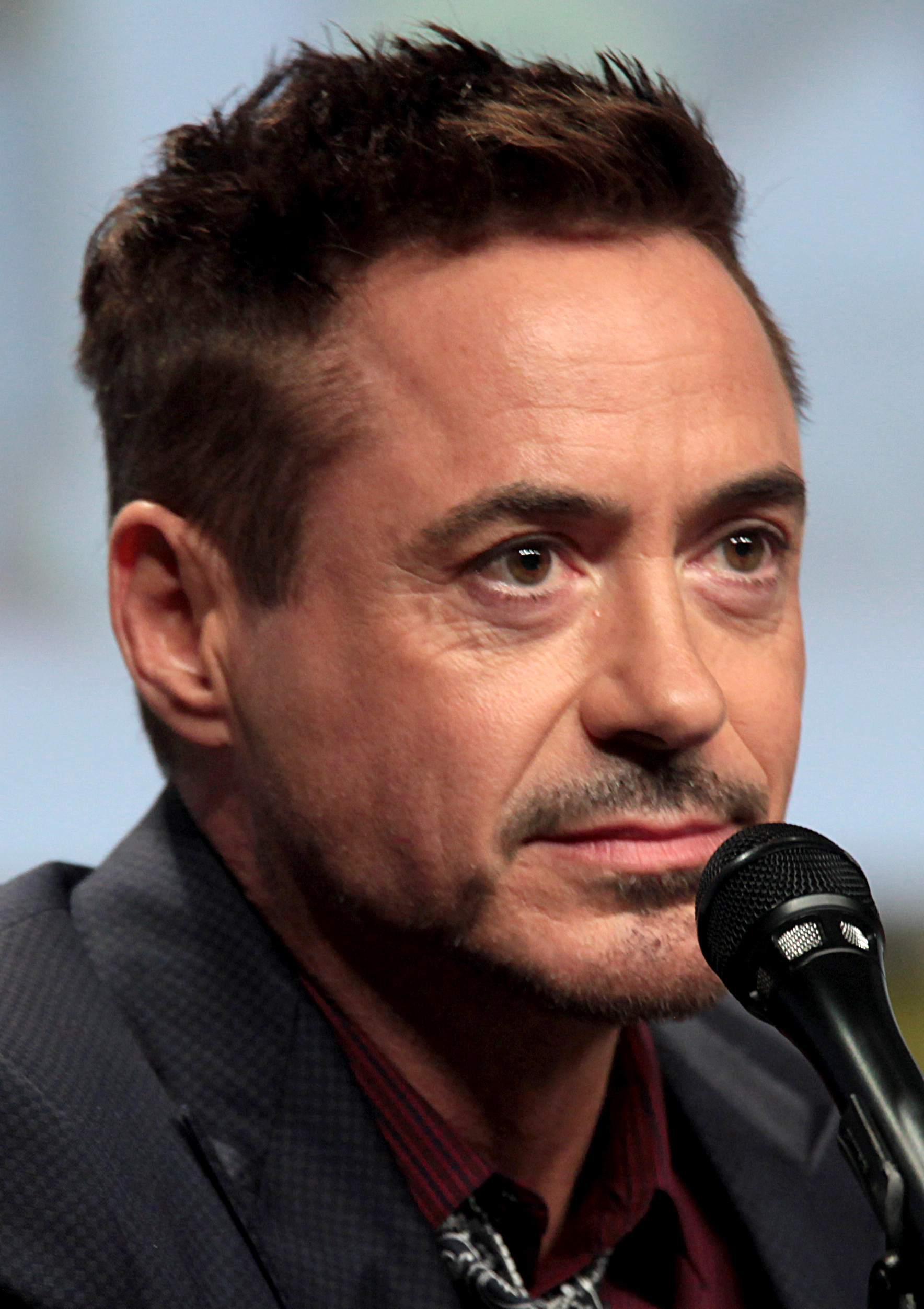
Robert Downey Jr., Best Supporting Actor winner

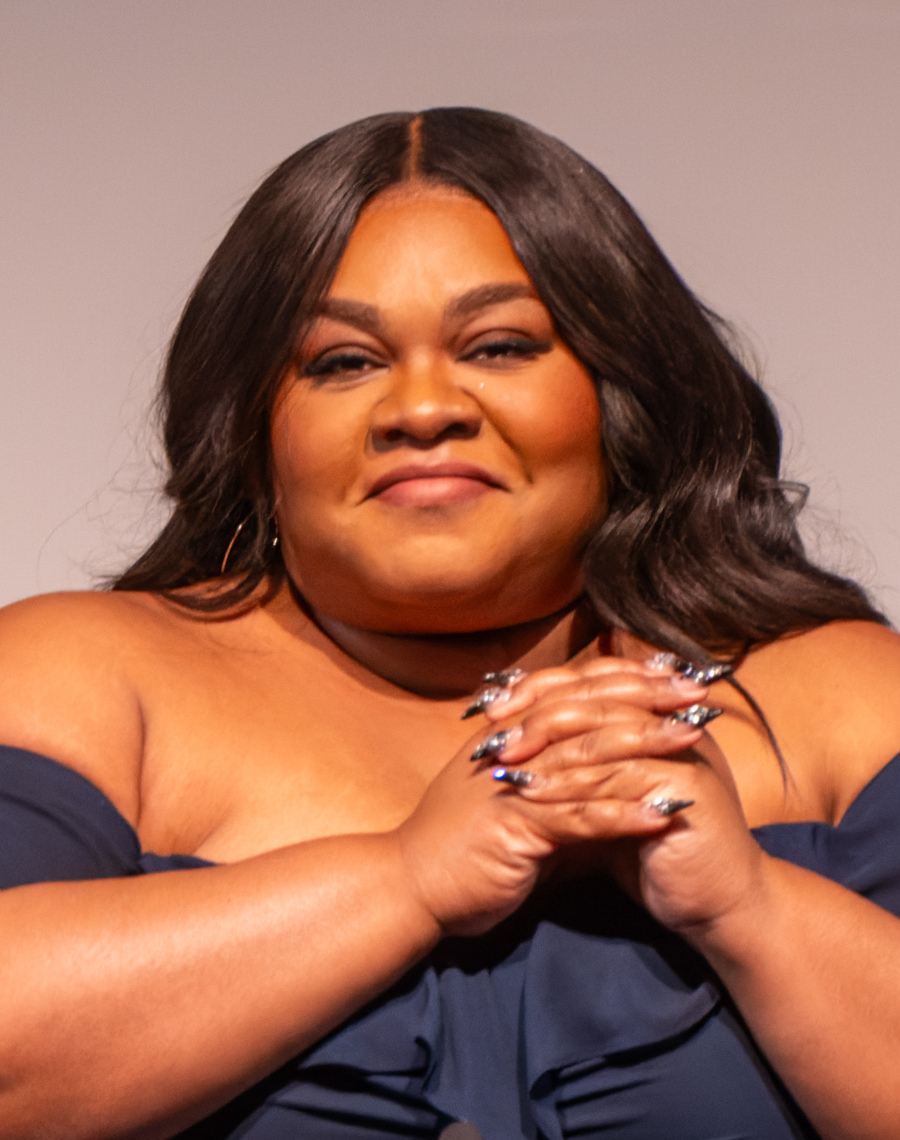
Da'Vine Joy Randolph, Best Supporting Actress winner

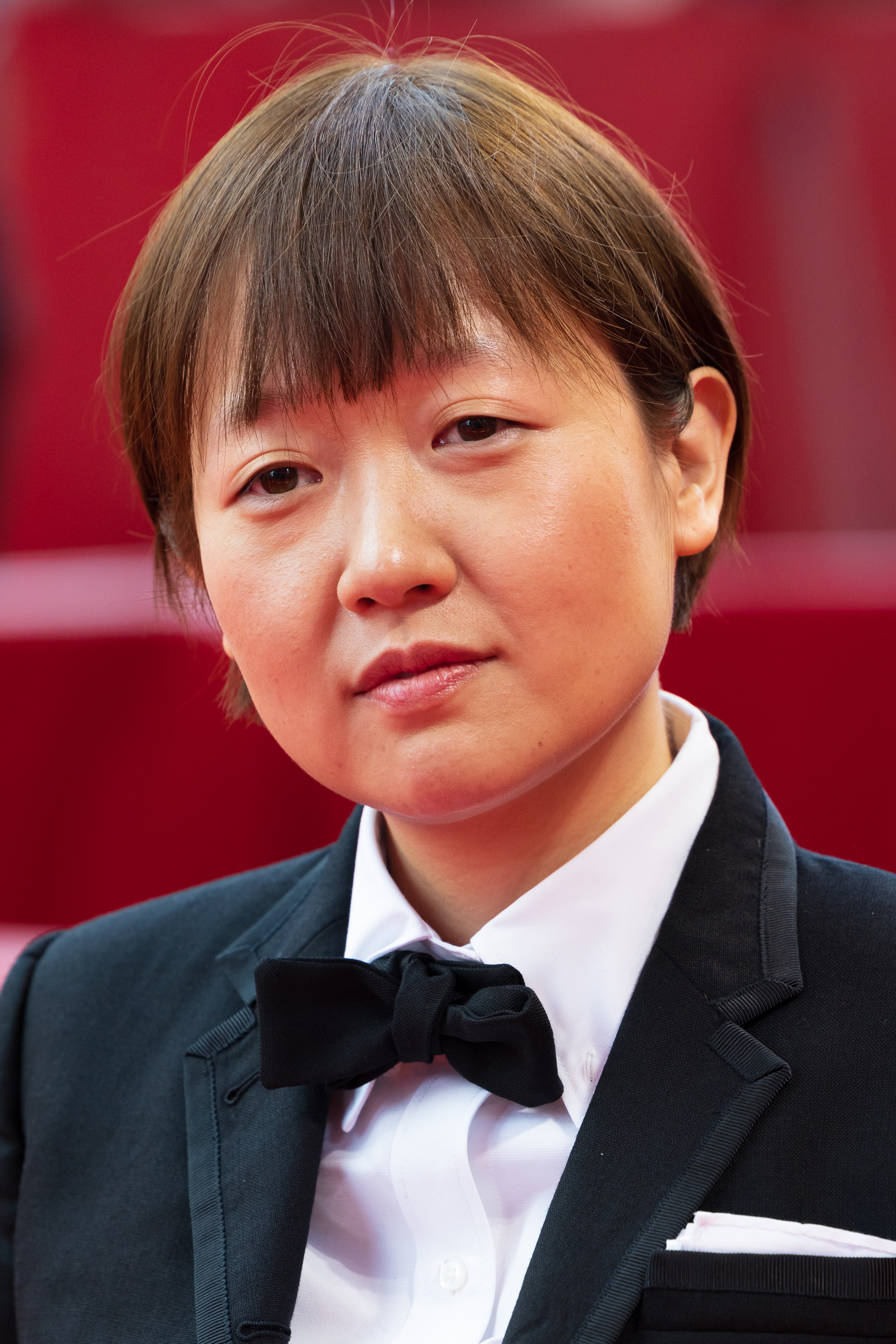
Celine Song, Best Original Screenplay and Best First Film winner

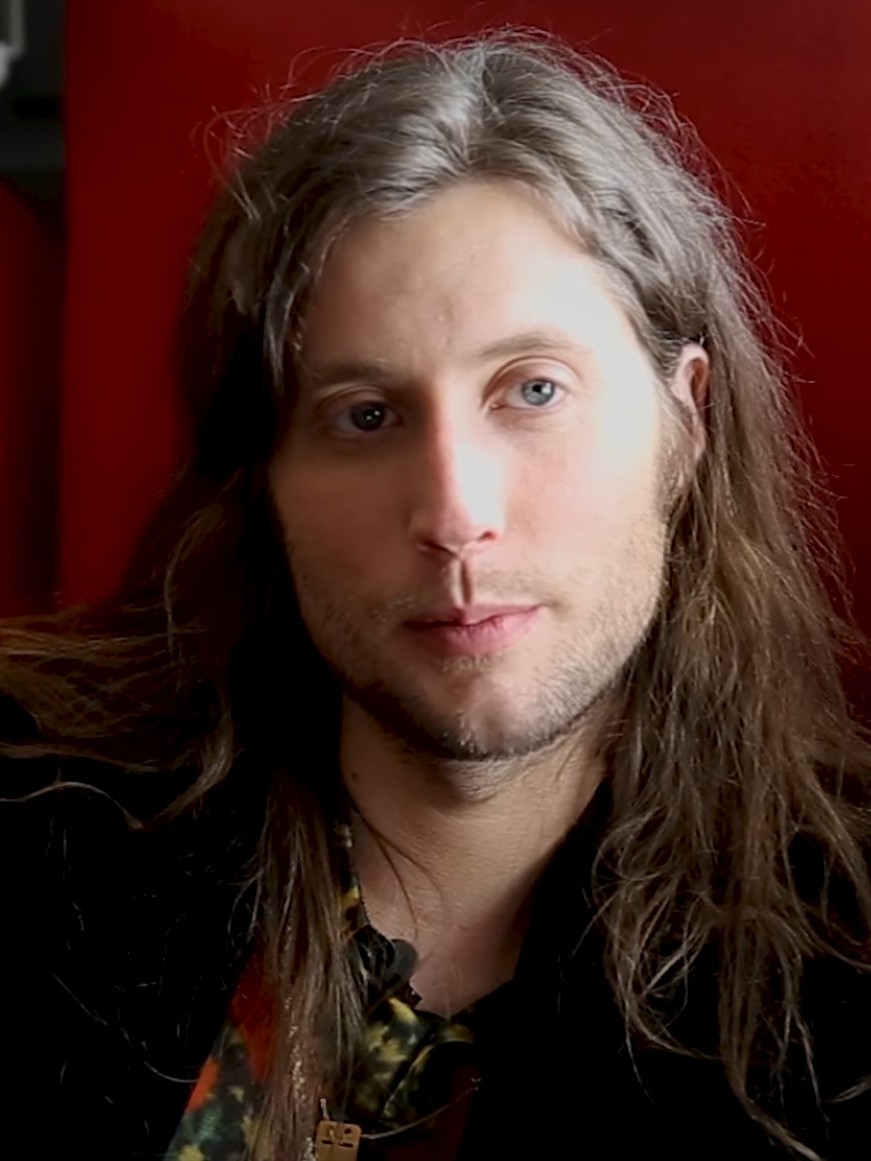
Ludwig Göransson, Best Original Score winner

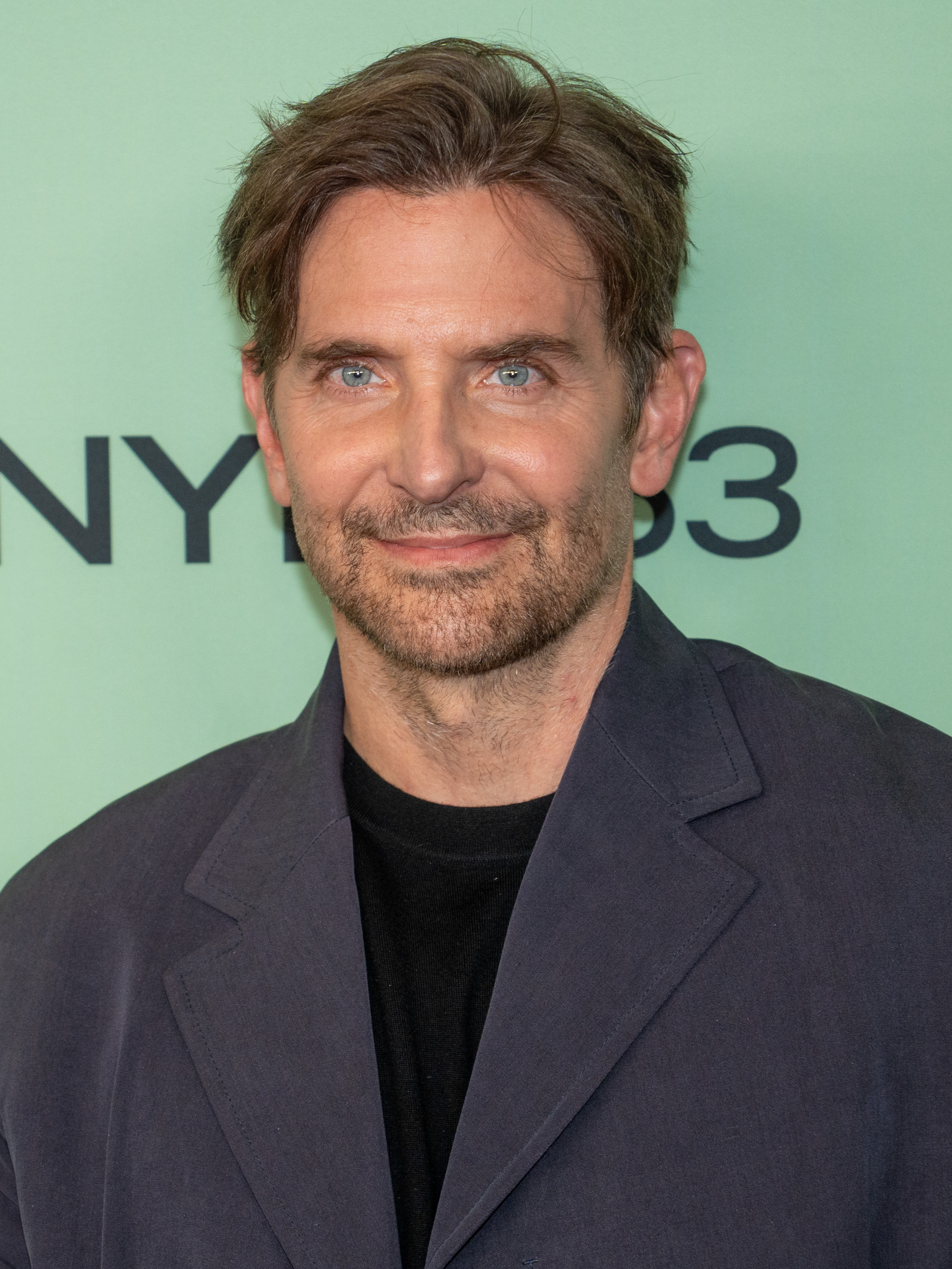
Bradley Cooper, Best Voice Acting/Animated/Digital Performance winner

Best Film	Best Director
1. **Killers of the Flower Moon**; 2. Oppenheimer; 3. Poor Things; 4. Past Lives; 5. The Holdovers; 6. Godzilla Minus One; 7. The Iron Claw; 8. Spider-Man: Across the Spider-Verse; 9. Barbie; 10. American Fiction	**Christopher Nolan – Oppenheimer**; Greta Gerwig – Barbie; Yorgos Lanthimos – Poor Things; Martin Scorsese – Killers of the Flower Moon; Celine Song – Past Lives
Best Actor	Best Actress
**Cillian Murphy – Oppenheimer as J. Robert Oppenheimer**; Leonardo DiCaprio – Killers of the Flower Moon as Ernest Burkhart; Paul Giamatti – The Holdovers as Paul Hunham; Andrew Scott – All of Us Strangers as Adam; Jeffrey Wright – American Fiction as Thelonious "Monk" Ellison	**Lily Gladstone – Killers of the Flower Moon as Mollie Burkhart**; Sandra Hüller – Anatomy of a Fall as Sandra Voyter; Greta Lee – Past Lives as Nora Moon; Margot Robbie – Barbie as Barbie; Emma Stone – Poor Things as Bella Baxter
Best Supporting Actor	Best Supporting Actress
**Robert Downey Jr. – Oppenheimer as Lewis Strauss**; Robert De Niro – Killers of the Flower Moon as William King Hale; Ryan Gosling – Barbie as Ken; Charles Melton – May December as Joe Yoo; Mark Ruffalo – Poor Things as Duncan Wedderburn	**Da'Vine Joy Randolph – The Holdovers as Mary Lamb**; Emily Blunt – Oppenheimer as Kitty Oppenheimer; Danielle Brooks – The Color Purple as Sofia; Rachel McAdams – Are You There God? It's Me, Margaret. as Barbara Simon; Julianne Moore – May December as Gracie Atherton-Yoo
Best Adapted Screenplay	Best Original Screenplay
**Christopher Nolan – Oppenheimer**; Kelly Fremon Craig – Are You There God? It's Me, Margaret.; Cord Jefferson – American Fiction; Tony McNamara – Poor Things; Eric Roth and Martin Scorsese – Killers of the Flower Moon	**Celine Song – Past Lives**; Samy Burch and Alex Mechanik – May December; Greta Gerwig and Noah Baumbach – Barbie; David Hemingson – The Holdovers; Justine Triet and Arthur Harari – Anatomy of a Fall
Best Animated Film	Best Documentary
**Spider-Man: Across the Spider-Verse**; The Boy and the Heron; Elemental; Suzume; Teenage Mutant Ninja Turtles: Mutant Mayhem	**Still: A Michael J. Fox Movie**; 20 Days in Mariupol; Beyond Utopia; Four Daughters; Little Richard: I Am Everything
Best International Film	Best First Film
**Godzilla Minus One**; Anatomy of a Fall; The Boy and the Heron; The Taste of Things; The Zone of Interest	**Celine Song – Past Lives**; Raine Allen-Miller – Rye Lane; Cord Jefferson – American Fiction; Danny and Michael Philippou – Talk to Me; A. V. Rockwell – A Thousand and One
Best Cinematography	Best Editing
**Hoyte van Hoytema – Oppenheimer**; Matthew Libatique – Maestro; Rodrigo Prieto – Barbie; Rodrigo Prieto – Killers of the Flower Moon; Robbie Ryan – Poor Things	**Jennifer Lame – Oppenheimer**; Yorgos Mavropsaridis – Poor Things; Thelma Schoonmaker – Killers of the Flower Moon; Kevin Tent – The Holdovers; Michelle Tesoro – Maestro
Best Original Score	Best Ensemble
**Ludwig Göransson – Oppenheimer**; Jerskin Fendrix – Poor Things; Daniel Pemberton – Spider-Man: Across the Spider-Verse; Robbie Robertson – Killers of the Flower Moon; Mark Ronson and Andrew Wyatt – Barbie	**Oppenheimer**; Asteroid City; Barbie; Killers of the Flower Moon; Poor Things
Best Stunt Coordinator	Best Voice Acting/Animated/Digital Performance
**Stephen Dunlevy and Scott Rogers – John Wick: Chapter 4**; Wade Eastwood – Mission Impossible Dead Reckoning; Chavo Guerrero Jr. – The Iron Claw; Crispin Layfield – Polite Society; Noon Orsatti – Extraction 2	**Bradley Cooper – Guardians of the Galaxy Vol. 3 as Rocket**; Ayo Edebiri – TMNT: Mutant Mayhem as April O'Neil; Shameik Moore – Spider-Man: Across the Spider-Verse as Miles Morales / Spider-Man; Chloë Grace Moretz – Nimona as Nimona; Hailee Steinfeld – Spider-Man: Across the Spider-Verse as Gwen Stacy / Spider-Gwen
The Robert R. "Bobby" McCurdy Memorial Breakthrough Artist Award	Best Austin Film 2023
**Lily Gladstone – Killers of the Flower Moon, The Unknown Country, Fancy Dance, and Quantum Cowboys**; Ayo Edebiri – Bottoms, Theater Camp, and TMNT: Mutant Mayhem; Abby Ryder Fortson – Are You There God? It's Me, Margaret.; Dominic Sessa – The Holdovers; Celine Song – Past Lives	**Milli Vanilli (dir. Luke Korem)**; The Mojo Manifesto: The Life and Times of Mojo Nixon (dir. Matt Eskey); Sorry About the Demon (dir. Emily Hagins); Thirst (dir. Eric Owen); When You Get to the Forest (dir. Eric Power)
Special Honorary Award
**"In memoriam of the life and works of Lee Sun-kyun" (Parasite, Sleep, and Project Silence)**
