= Austin Film Critics Association Awards 2022 =

Film awards edition

18th Austin Film Critics Association Awards
- Date: January 10, 2023
- Location: Austin, Texas
- Presented by: Austin Film Critics Association
- Website: austinfilmcritics.org

The 18th Austin Film Critics Association Awards, honoring the best in filmmaking for 2022, were announced on January 10, 2023. The nominations were announced on January 3, 2023.

Everything Everywhere All at Once led the nominations with eleven and also received the most awards with nine wins, including Best Film.

== Winners and nominees ==
The winners are listed first and in bold.

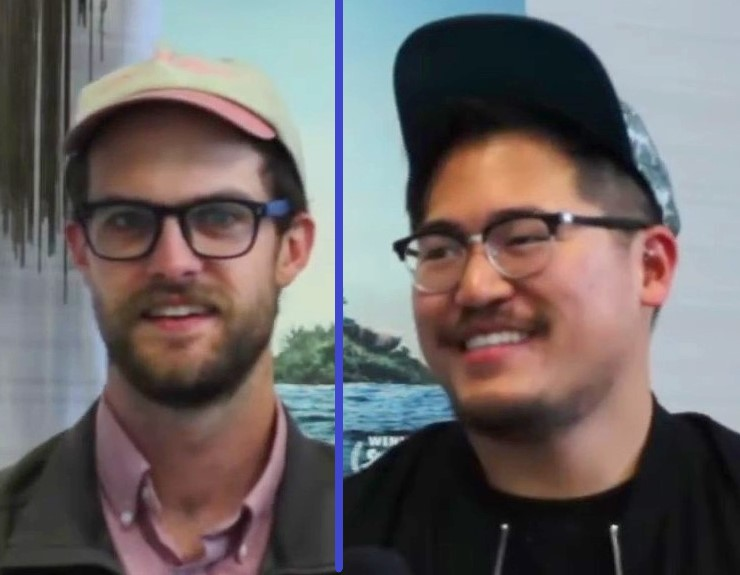
Daniel Scheinert and Daniel Kwan, Best Director and Best Original Screenplay winners

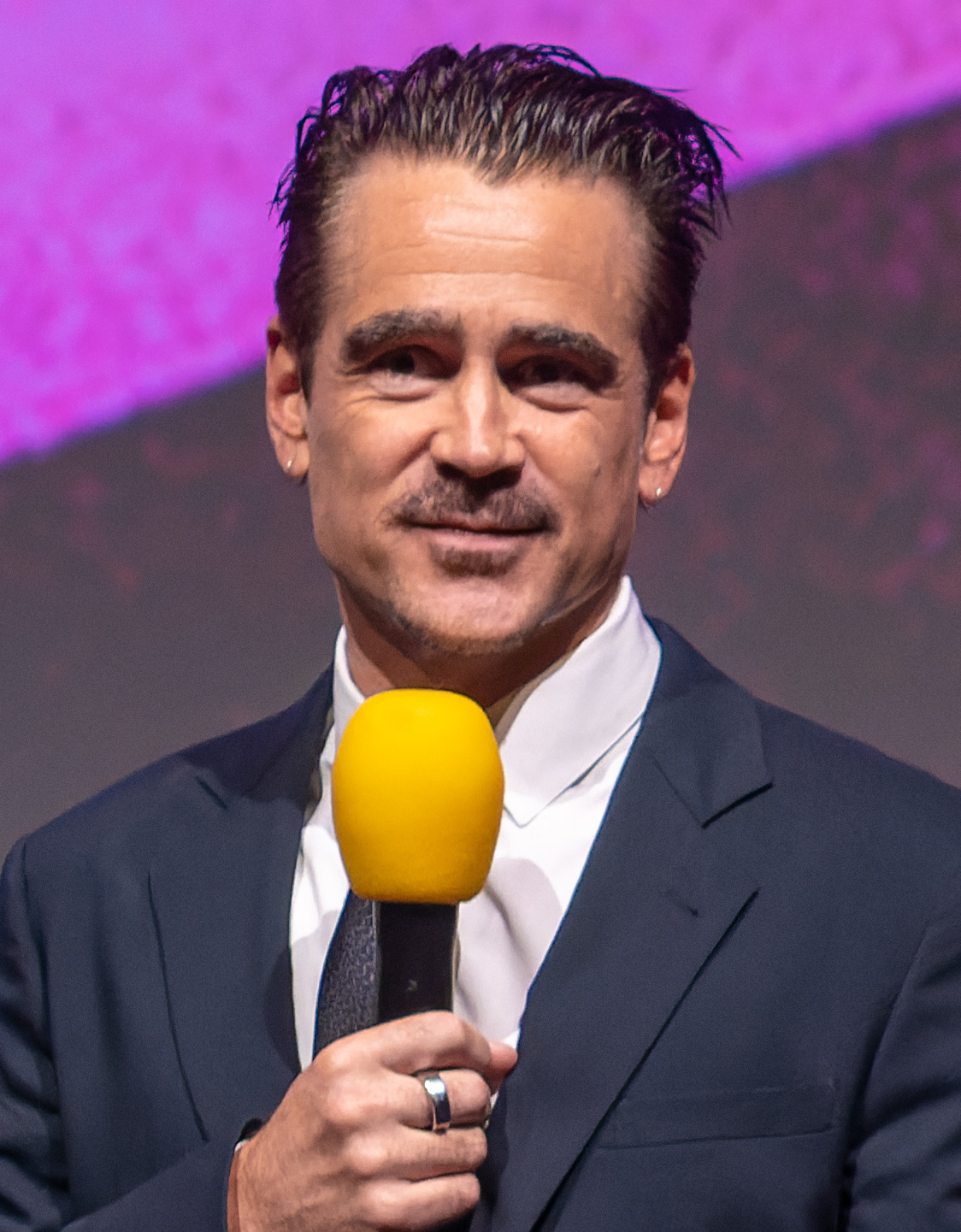
Colin Farrell, Best Actor winner

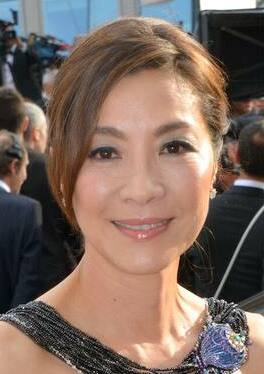
Michelle Yeoh, Best Actress winner

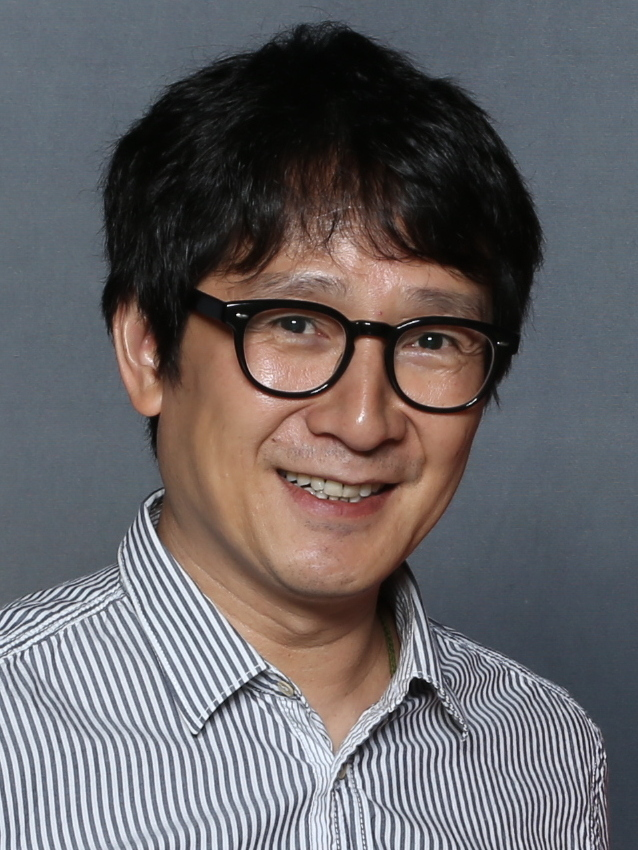
Ke Huy Quan, Best Supporting Actor winner

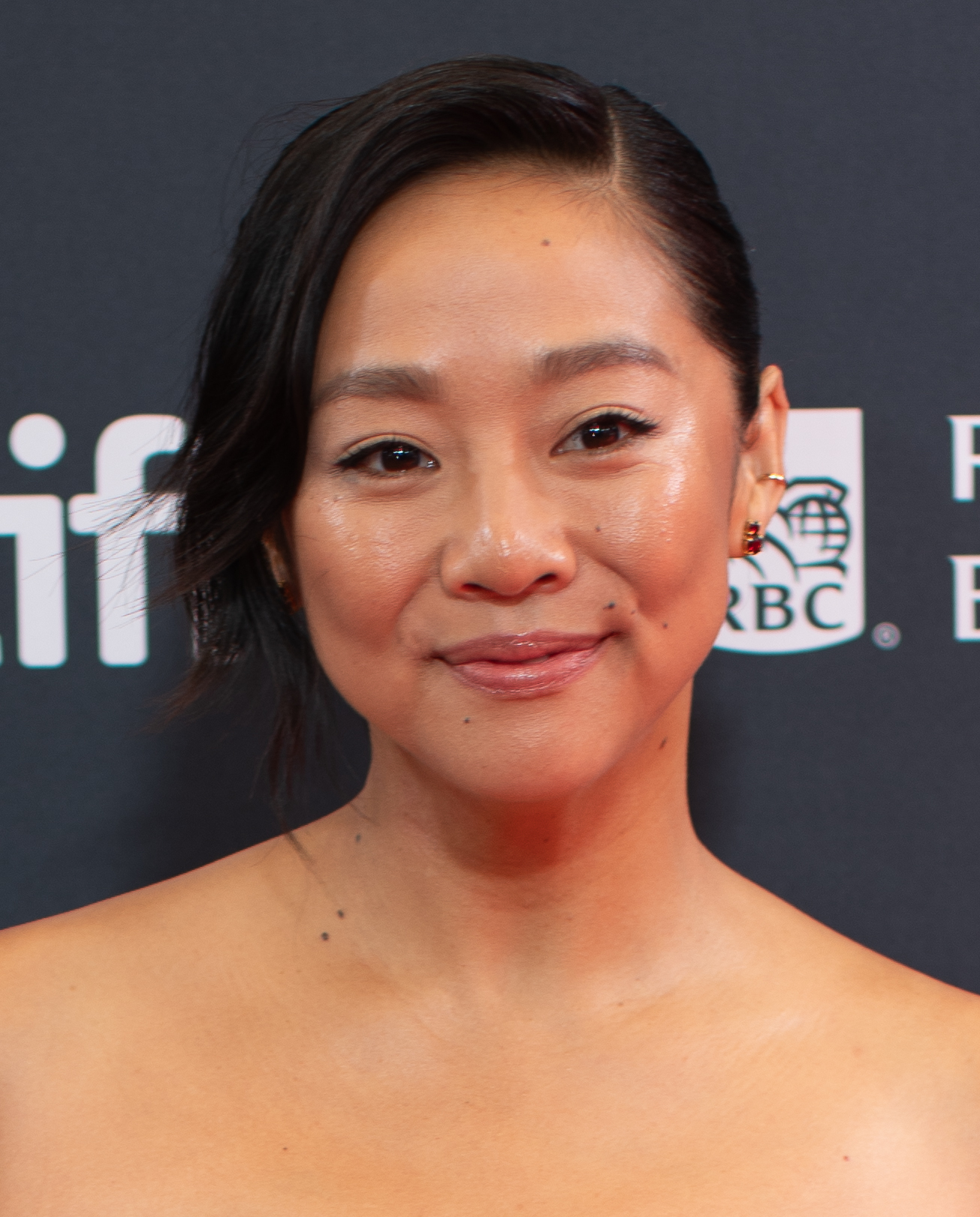
Stephanie Hsu, Best Supporting Actress winner

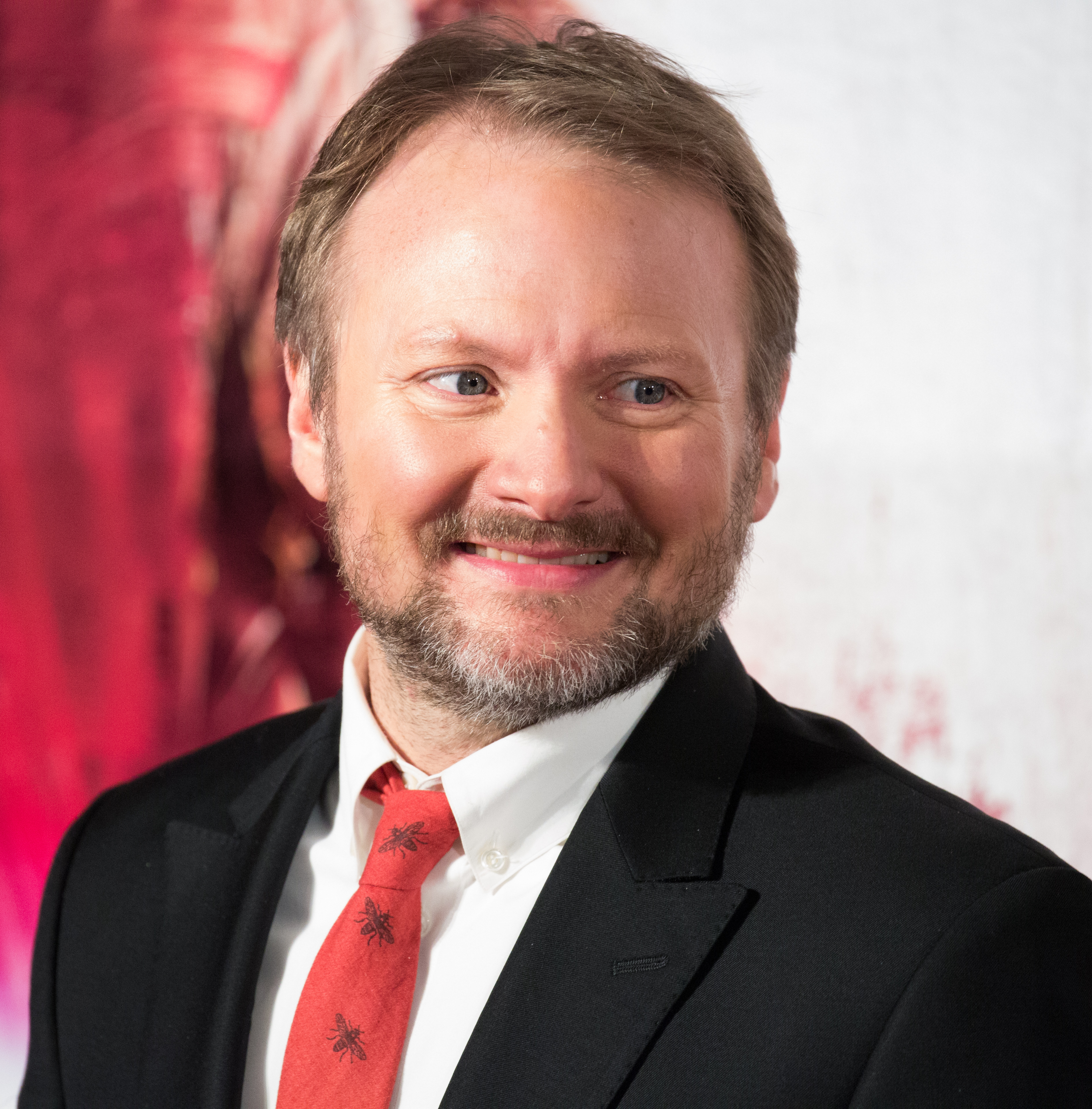
Rian Johnson, Best Adapted Screenplay winner

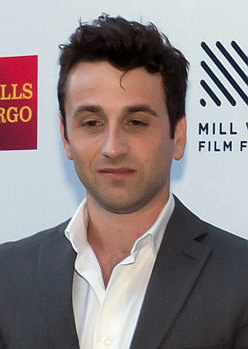
Justin Hurwitz, Best Score winner

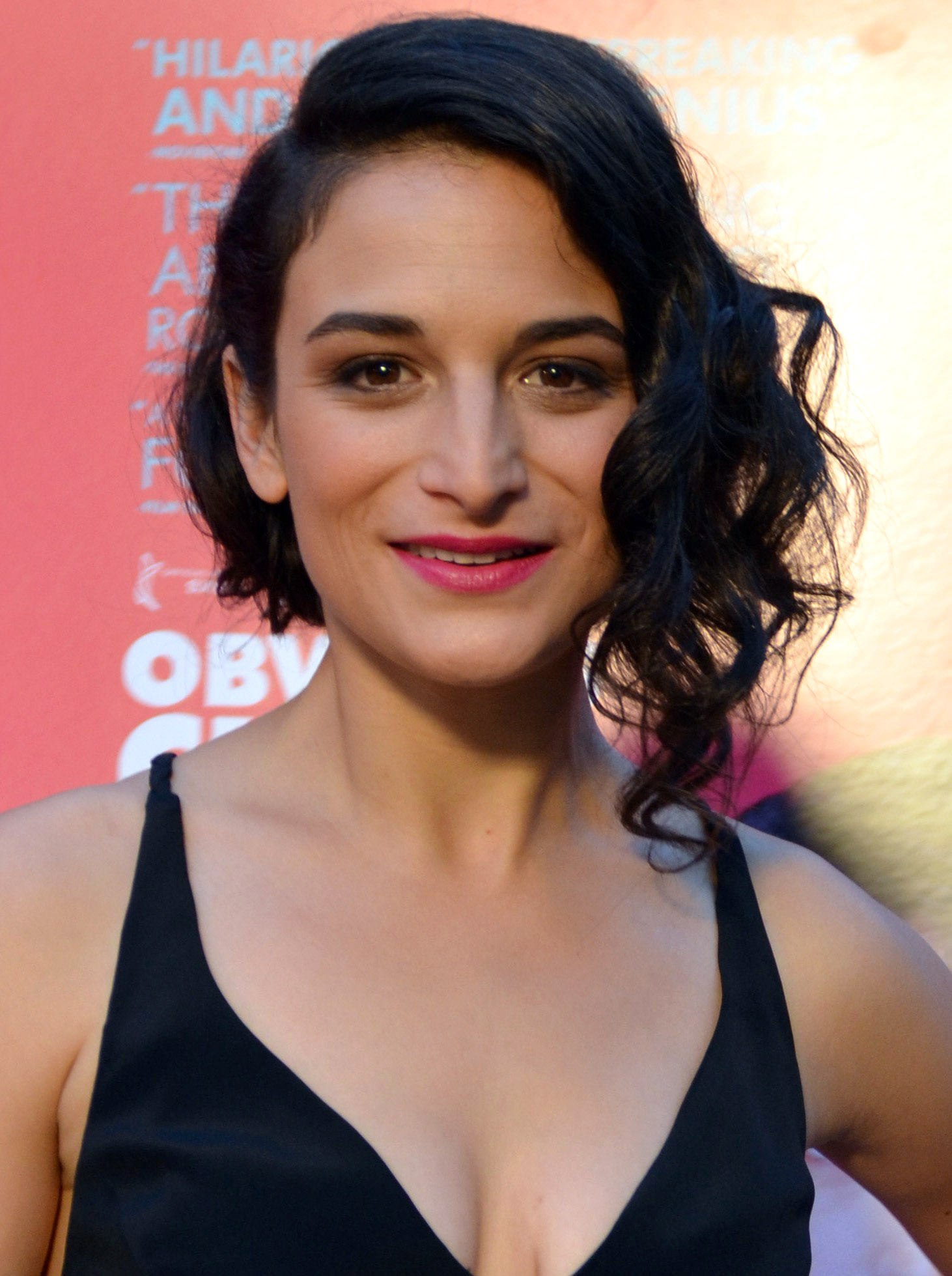
Jenny Slate, Best Voice Acting/Animated/Digital Performance winner

Best Film	Best Director
1. **Everything Everywhere All at Once**; 2. The Banshees of Inisherin; 3. Nope; 4. Decision to Leave; 5. RRR; 6. Tár; 7. Top Gun: Maverick; 8. Bones and All; 9. The Fabelmans; 10. Babylon	**Daniel Kwan and Daniel Scheinert – Everything Everywhere All at Once**; Park Chan-wook – Decision to Leave; Todd Field – Tár; Martin McDonagh – The Banshees of Inisherin; S. S. Rajamouli – RRR
Best Actor	Best Actress
**Colin Farrell – The Banshees of Inisherin as Pádraic Súilleabháin**; Austin Butler – Elvis as Elvis Presley; Tom Cruise – Top Gun: Maverick as Captain Pete "Maverick" Mitchell; Brendan Fraser – The Whale as Charlie; Paul Mescal – Aftersun as Calum Paterson	**Michelle Yeoh – Everything Everywhere All at Once as Evelyn Quan Wang**; Cate Blanchett – Tár as Lydia Tár; Viola Davis – The Woman King as General Nanisca; Danielle Deadwyler – Till as Mamie Till-Mobley; Mia Goth – Pearl as Pearl
Best Supporting Actor	Best Supporting Actress
**Ke Huy Quan – Everything Everywhere All at Once as Waymond Wang**; Brendan Gleeson – The Banshees of Inisherin as Colm Doherty; Brian Tyree Henry – Causeway as James Aucoin; Barry Keoghan – The Banshees of Inisherin as Dominic Kearney; Mark Rylance – Bones and All as Sully	**Stephanie Hsu – Everything Everywhere All at Once as Joy Wang / Jobu Tupaki**; Kerry Condon – The Banshees of Inisherin as Siobhán Súilleabháin; Jamie Lee Curtis – Everything Everywhere All at Once as Deirdre Beaubeirdre; Janelle Monáe – Glass Onion: A Knives Out Mystery as Helen Brand / Cassandra "Andi" Brand; Keke Palmer – Nope as Emerald "Em" Haywood
Best Original Screenplay	Best Adapted Screenplay
**Daniel Kwan and Daniel Scheinert – Everything Everywhere All at Once**; Todd Field – Tár; Tony Kushner and Steven Spielberg – The Fabelmans; Martin McDonagh – The Banshees of Inisherin; Jordan Peele – Nope	**Rian Johnson – Glass Onion: A Knives Out Mystery**; Guillermo del Toro and Patrick McHale – Guillermo del Toro's Pinocchio; Samuel D. Hunter – The Whale; David Kajganich – Bones and All; Sarah Polley and Miriam Toews – Women Talking
Best Animated Film	Best Documentary
**Marcel the Shell with Shoes On**; Apollo 10½: A Space Age Childhood; Guillermo del Toro's Pinocchio; Mad God; Turning Red	**All the Beauty and the Bloodshed**; Descendant; Fire of Love; Good Night Oppy; Moonage Daydream
Best International Film	Best First Film
**Decision to Leave**; Close; EO; Holy Spider; RRR	**Charlotte Wells – Aftersun**; Dean Fleischer Camp – Marcel the Shell with Shoes On; John Patton Ford – Emily the Criminal; Chloe Okuno – Watcher; Domee Shi – Turning Red
Best Cinematography	Best Editing
**Larkin Seiple – Everything Everywhere All at Once**; Russell Carpenter – Avatar: The Way of Water; Claudio Miranda – Top Gun: Maverick; Linus Sandgren – Babylon; Hoyte van Hoytema – Nope	**Paul Rogers – Everything Everywhere All at Once**; Bob Ducsay – Glass Onion: A Knives Out Mystery; Eddie Hamilton – Top Gun: Maverick; A. Sreekar Prasad – RRR; Monika Willi – Tár
Best Original Score	Best Ensemble
**Justin Hurwitz – Babylon**; Carter Burwell – The Banshees of Inisherin; Michael Giacchino – The Batman; M. M. Keeravani – RRR; Son Lux – Everything Everywhere All at Once	**Everything Everywhere All at Once**; The Banshees of Inisherin; The Fabelmans; Glass Onion: A Knives Out Mystery; Women Talking
Best Stunt Coordinator	Best Voice Acting/Animated/Digital Performance
**Nick Powell – RRR**; Daniel Hernandez – The Woman King; Kevin LaRosa Jr. and Casey O'Neill – Top Gun: Maverick; Timothy Eulich – Everything Everywhere All at Once; C.C. Smiff and Jón Viðar Arnþórsson – The Northman	**Jenny Slate – Marcel the Shell with Shoes On as Marcel**; Stephen Lang – Avatar: The Way of Water as Colonel Miles Quaritch; Ewan McGregor – Guillermo del Toro's Pinocchio as Sebastian J. Cricket; Zoe Saldaña – Avatar: The Way of Water as Neytiri; Sigourney Weaver – Avatar: The Way of Water as Kiri Sully
The Robert R. "Bobby" McCurdy Memorial Breakthrough Artist Award	Best Austin Film 2022
**Jenna Ortega – The Fallout, Scream, X, and Studio 666 as Vada Cavell, Tara Carpenter, Lorraine Day, and Skye Willow**; Austin Butler – Elvis as Elvis Presley; Frankie Corio – Aftersun as Sophie Paterson; Stephanie Hsu – Everything Everywhere All at Once as Joy Wang / Jobu Tupaki; Amber Midthunder – Prey as Naru	**Descendant**; Apollo 10½: A Space Age Childhood; Deep in the Heart: A Texas Wildlife Story; Shouting Down Midnight; There There
Special Honorary Award
**Glen Powell (for his work on Apollo 10½: A Space Age Childhood, Devotion, and Top Gun: Maverick)**
