= Austin Film Critics Association =

Organization of professional film critics from Austin, Texas

- Formation: 2005
- Purpose: Film critics
- Location: Austin, Texas, United States
- Founders: Cole Dabney; Robert "Bobby" McCurdy
- Website: austinfilmcritics.org

The Austin Film Critics Association (AFCA) is an organization of professional film critics from Austin, Texas, United States.

Each year, the AFCA votes on their end-of-year awards for films released in the same calendar year. A special award, the Austin Film Award, is given each year to the best film made in Austin or by an Austin-area director.

== History ==
The Austin Film Critics Association was founded in 2005 by local film critics Cole Dabney and Robert McCurdy while attending Bowie High School in Austin. The organization grew in its first eight years, expanding from three members in 2005 to 25 members in 2013.

On January 12, 2007, after only one year in existence, Entertainment Weekly called the AFCA "wildly contrarian" for naming Elliot Page Best Actress for his role in Hard Candy over Helen Mirren for her performance in The Queen, as Mirren had swept the category so far during the award season.

The association chose to name the group's Breakthrough Artist Award to honor Robert "Bobby" McCurdy starting in 2010. McCurdy died on December 19, 2010, while training to become a Naval Aviator.

== Categories ==
- Best Film
- Best Director
- Best Actor
- Best Actress
- Best Supporting Actor
- Best Supporting Actress
- Best Original Screenplay
- Best Adapted Screenplay
- Best Film Editing
- Best Ensemble
- Best Animated Film
- Best Foreign Language Film
- Best First Film
- Best Documentary
- Best Cinematography
- Best Score
- Best Stunts
- Best Motion Capture/Special Effects Performance
- The Robert R. "Bobby" McCurdy Memorial Breakthrough Artist Award
- Austin Film Award
- Special Honorary Award

== Ceremonies ==
- 2005
- 2006
- 2007
- 2008
- 2009
- 2010
- 2011
- 2012
- 2013
- 2014
- 2015
- 2016
- 2017
- 2018
- 2019
- 2020
- 2021
- 2022
- 2023
- 2024
- 2025

== Winners ==
- † = Winner of the Academy Award

=== Best Picture ===
Year	Winner	Director(s)
2005	Crash †	Paul Haggis
2006	United 93	Paul Greengrass
2007	There Will Be Blood	Paul Thomas Anderson
2008	The Dark Knight	Christopher Nolan
2009	The Hurt Locker †	Kathryn Bigelow
2010	Black Swan	Darren Aronofsky
2011	Hugo	Martin Scorsese
2012	Zero Dark Thirty	Kathryn Bigelow
2013	Her	Spike Jonze
2014	Boyhood	Richard Linklater
2015	Mad Max: Fury Road	George Miller
2016	Moonlight †	Barry Jenkins
2017	Get Out	Jordan Peele
2018	If Beale Street Could Talk	Barry Jenkins
2019	Parasite †	Bong Joon-ho
2020	Minari	Lee Isaac Chung
2021	The Power of the Dog	Jane Campion
2022	Everything Everywhere All At Once †	Daniel Kwan and Daniel Scheinert
2023	Oppenheimer †	Christopher Nolan
2024	Anora †	Sean Baker

=== Best Director ===
Year	Winner	Film
2005	Paul Haggis	Crash
2006	Alfonso Cuarón	Children of Men
2007	Paul Thomas Anderson	There Will Be Blood
2008	Christopher Nolan	The Dark Knight
2009	Kathryn Bigelow †	The Hurt Locker
2010	Darren Aronofsky	Black Swan
2011	Nicolas Winding Refn	Drive
2012	Paul Thomas Anderson	The Master
2013	Alfonso Cuarón †	Gravity
2014	Richard Linklater	Boyhood
2015	George Miller	Mad Max: Fury Road
2016	Barry Jenkins	Moonlight
2017	Guillermo del Toro †	The Shape of Water
2018	Barry Jenkins	If Beale Street Could Talk
2019	Bong Joon-ho †	Parasite
2020	Lee Isaac Chung	Minari
2021	Jane Campion †	The Power of the Dog
2022	Daniel Kwan and Daniel Scheinert †	Everything Everywhere All At Once
2023	Christopher Nolan †	Oppenheimer
2024	Sean Baker †	Anora

=== Best Actor ===
Year	Nominee	Film	Role
2005	Philip Seymour Hoffman †	Capote	Truman Capote
2006	Leonardo DiCaprio	The Departed	Billy
2007	Daniel Day-Lewis †	There Will Be Blood	Daniel Plainview
2008	Sean Penn †	Milk	Harvey Milk
2009	Colin Firth	A Single Man	George Falconer
2010	Colin Firth †	The King's Speech	King George VI
2011	Michael Shannon	Take Shelter	Curtis LaForche
2012	Joaquin Phoenix	The Master	Freddie Quell
2013	Chiwetel Ejiofor	12 Years a Slave	Solomon Northup
2014	Jake Gyllenhaal	Nightcrawler	Louis "Lou" Bloom
2015	Michael Fassbender	Steve Jobs	Steve Jobs
2016	Casey Affleck †	Manchester by the Sea	Lee Chandler
2017	Timothée Chalamet	Call Me by Your Name	Elio Perlman
2018	Ethan Hawke	First Reformed	Pastor Ernst Toller
2019	Adam Sandler	Uncut Gems	Howard Ratner
2020	Riz Ahmed	Sound of Metal	Ruben Stone
2021	Nicolas Cage	Pig	Robin "Rob" Feld
2022	Colin Farrell	The Banshees of Inisherin	Pádraic Súilleabháin
2023	Cillian Murphy †	Oppenheimer	J. Robert Oppenheimer
2024	Colman Domingo	Sing Sing	John "Divine G" Whitfield

=== Best Actress ===
Year	Nominee	Film	Role
2005	Reese Witherspoon †	Walk the Line	June Carter Cash
2006	Elliot Page ^{[A]}	Hard Candy	Hayley Stark
2007	Elliot Page ^{[A]}	Juno	Juno MacGuff
2008	Anne Hathaway	Rachel Getting Married	Kym
2009	Mélanie Laurent	Inglourious Basterds	Shosanna Dreyfus / Emmanuelle Mimieux
2010	Natalie Portman †	Black Swan	Nina Sayers
2011	Tilda Swinton	We Need to Talk About Kevin	Eva Khatchadourian
2012	Jennifer Lawrence †	Silver Linings Playbook	Tiffany Maxwell
2013	Brie Larson	Short Term 12	Grace Howard
2014	Rosamund Pike	Gone Girl	Amy Elliott Dunne
2015	Brie Larson †	Room	Joy "Ma" Newsome
2016	Isabelle Huppert	Elle	Michèle Leblanc
2017	Frances McDormand †	Three Billboards Outside Ebbing, Missouri	Mildred Hayes
2018	Olivia Colman †	The Favourite	Anne, Queen of Great Britain
2019	Lupita Nyong'o	Us	Adelaide Wilson / Red
2020	Carey Mulligan	Promising Young Woman	Cassandra "Cassie" Thomas
2021	Agathe Rousselle	Titane	Alexia / Adrien
2022	Michelle Yeoh †	Everything Everywhere All At Once	Evelyn Quan Wang
2023	Lily Gladstone	Killers of the Flower Moon	Mollie Kyle
2024	Mikey Madison †	Anora	Anora "Ani" Mikheeva

=== Best Supporting Actor ===
Year	Winner	Film	Role
2005	William Hurt	A History of Violence	Richie Cusack
2006	Jack Nicholson	The Departed	Francis "Frank" Costello
2007	Javier Bardem †	No Country for Old Men	Anton Chigurh
2008	Heath Ledger (posthumous) †	The Dark Knight	The Joker
2009	Christoph Waltz †	Inglourious Basterds	Hans Landa
2010	Christian Bale †	The Fighter	Dicky Eklund
2011	Albert Brooks	Drive	Bernie Rose
2012	Christoph Waltz †	Django Unchained	Lancaster Dodd
2013	Jared Leto †	Dallas Buyers Club	Rayon
2014	J. K. Simmons †	Whiplash	Terence Fletcher
2015	Sylvester Stallone	Creed	Rocky Balboa
2016	Mahershala Ali †	Moonlight	Juan
2017	Willem Dafoe	The Florida Project	Bobby Hicks
2018	Richard E Grant	Can You Ever Forgive Me?	Jack Hock
2019	Brad Pitt †	Once Upon a Time in...Hollywood	Cliff Booth
2020	Daniel Kaluuya †	Judas and the Black Messiah	Fred Hampton
2021	Kodi-Smit McPhee	The Power of the Dog	Peter Gordon
2022	Ke Huy Quan †	Everything Everywhere All At Once	Waymond Wang
2023	Robert Downey Jr. †	Oppenheimer	Lewis Strauss
2024	Yura Borisov	Anora	Igor

=== Best Supporting Actress ===
Year	Winner	Film	Role
2005	Laura Linney	The Squid and the Whale	Joan Berkman
2006	Rinko Kikuchi	Babel	Chieko Wataya
2007	Allison Janney	Juno	Bren MacGuff
2008	Taraji P. Henson	The Curious Case of Benjamin Button	Queenie
2009	Anna Kendrick	Up in the Air	Natalie Keener
2010	Hailee Steinfeld	True Grit	Mattie Ross
2011	Jessica Chastain	Take Shelter	Samantha LaForche
2012	Anne Hathaway †	Les Misérables	Fantine
2013	Lupita Nyong'o †	12 Years a Slave	Patsey
2014	Patricia Arquette †	Boyhood	Olivia Evans
2015	Alicia Vikander	Ex Machina	Ava
2016	Viola Davis †	Fences	Rose Maxson
2017	Allison Janney †	I, Tonya	LaVona Golden
2018	Regina King †	If Beale Street Could Talk	Sharon Rivers
2019	Jennifer Lopez	Hustlers	Ramona Vega
2020	Youn Yuh-jung †	Minari	Soonja
2021	Kirsten Dunst	The Power of the Dog	Rose Gordon
2022	Stephanie Hsu	Everything Everywhere All At Once	Joy Wang/Jobu Tupaki
2023	Da'Vine Joy Randolph †	The Holdovers	Mary Lamb
2024	Margaret Qualley	The Substance	Sue

== Multiple award winners ==
=== Films ===
- 9 awards:
  - Everything Everywhere All At Once (2022): Best Film, Best Director, Best Actress, Best Supporting Actor, Best Supporting Actress, Best Original Screenplay, Best Cinematography, Best Editing, Best Ensemble
- 8 Awards:
  - Oppenheimer (2023):
- 6 Awards:
  - Anora (2024): Best Film, Best Director, Best Actress, Best Supporting Actor, Best Original Screenplay, Robert R. "Buddy" McCurdy Memorial Breakthrough Artist Award (Mikey Madison)
- 5 awards:
  - There Will Be Blood (2007): Best Film, Best Director, Best Actor, Best Cinematography, Best Original Score
  - The Dark Knight (2008): Best Film, Best Director, Best Supporting Actor, Best Original Score, Best Adapted Screenplay
  - Black Swan (2010): Best Film, Best Director, Best Actress, Best Original Screenplay, Best Cinematography
  - If Beale Street Could Talk (2018): Best Film, Best Director, Best Adapted Screenplay, Best Supporting Actor, Breakthrough Artist Award
  - The Power of the Dog (2021): Best Film, Best Director, Best Supporting Actor, Best Supporting Actress, Best Original Score
- 4 awards:
  - Juno (2007): Best Actress, Best Supporting Actress, Best Original Screenplay, Breakthrough Artist Award
  - Take Shelter (2011): Best Actor, Best Supporting Actress, Austin Film Award, Breakthrough Artist Award*
  - Boyhood (2014): Best Film, Best Director, Best Supporting Actress, Austin Film Award
  - Moonlight (2016): Best Film, Best Director, Best Supporting Actor, Best Original Screenplay
  - Parasite (2019): Best Film, Best Director, Best Original Screenplay, Best Foreign Language Film
  - Sing Sing (2024): Best Actor, Best Adapted Screenplay, Best Ensemble, Best Austin Film
- 3 awards
  - The Hurt Locker (2009): Best Film, Best Director, Best Cinematography
  - Inglourious Basterds (2009): Best Actress, Best Supporting Actor, Best Original Screenplay
  - The Master (2012): Best Director, Best Actor, Best Cinematography
  - 12 Years a Slave (2013): Best Actor, Best Supporting Actress, Best Adapted Screenplay
  - Her (2013): Best Film, Best Original Screenplay, Best Original Score
  - Nightcrawler (2014): Best Actor, Best Original Screenplay, Best First Film
  - Room (2015): Best Actress, Best Adapted Screenplay, Breakthrough Artist Award
  - Tower (2016): Best Documentary, Austin Film Award, Breakthrough Artist Award
  - Get Out (2017): Best Film, Best Original Screenplay, Best First Film
  - Call Me by Your Name (2017): Best Actor, Best Adapted Screenplay, Breakthrough Artist Award
  - Pig (2021): Best Actor, Best Original Screenplay, Best First Film
  - Killers of the Flower Moon (2023): Best Film, Best Actress, Breakthrough Artist Award

=== Producers, directors, and cinematographers ===
6 awards
Barry Jenkins

- Best Film
  - 2016 – Moonlight
  - 2018 – If Beale Street Could Talk
- Best Director
  - 2016 – Moonlight
  - 2018 – If Beale Street Could Talk
- Best Adapted Screenplay
  - 2018 – If Beale Street Could Talk
- Best Original Screenplay
  - 2016 – Moonlight

Richard Linklater

- Best Film
  - 2014 – Boyhood
- Best Director
  - 2014 – Boyhood
- Best Austin Film
  - 2006 – A Scanner Darkly
  - 2009 – Me and Orson Welles
  - 2012 – Bernie
  - 2014 – Boyhood

4 awards
Alfonso Cuarón

- Best Director
  - 2006 – Children of Men
  - 2013 – Gravity
- Best Adapted Screenplay
  - 2006 – Children of Men
- Best Cinematography
  - 2018 – Roma

Bong Joon-ho

- Best Film
  - 2019 - Parasite
- Best Director
  - 2019 - Parasite
- Best Original Screenplay
  - 2019 - Parasite
- Best Foreign Language Film
  - 2019 - Parasite

Emmanuel Lubezki

- Best Cinematography
  - 2006 – Babel
  - 2011 – The Tree of Life
  - 2013 – Gravity
  - 2014 – Birdman or (The Unexpected Virtue of Ignorance)

Keith Maitland

- Best Documentary
  - 2016 – Tower
- Bobby McCurdy Memorial Breakthrough Artist Award
  - 2016 – Tower
- Austin Film Award
  - 2016 – Tower
- Special Honorary Award
  - 2016 – Tower

3 awards
Paul Thomas Anderson

- Best Film
  - 2007 – There Will Be Blood
- Best Director
  - 2007 – There Will Be Blood
  - 2012 – The Master

Kathryn Bigelow

- Best Film
  - 2009 – The Hurt Locker
  - 2012 – Zero Dark Thirty
- Best Director
  - 2009 – The Hurt Locker

Daniel Kwan and Daniel Scheinert

- Best Film
  - 2022-Everything Everywhere All At Once
- Best Director
  - 2022-Everything Everywhere All At Once
- Best Original Screenplay
  - 2022-Everything Everywhere All At Once

Guillermo del Toro

- Best Director
  - 2017 – The Shape of Water
- Best Original Screenplay
  - 2006 – Pan's Labyrinth
- Best Foreign Film
  - 2006 – Pan's Labyrinth

Jordan Peele

- Best Film
  - 2017 – Get Out
- Best Original Screenplay
  - 2017 – Get Out
- Best First Film
  - 2017 – Get Out

Robert Rodriguez

- Best Austin Film
  - 2005 – Sin City
  - 2007 – Grindhouse (Shared with Quentin Tarantino)
- Best Animated Film
  - 2005 – Sin City

2 awards
Mark Boal

- Best Film
  - 2009 – The Hurt Locker
  - 2012 – Zero Dark Thirty

Megan Ellison

- Best Film
  - 2012 – Zero Dark Thirty
  - 2013 – Her

Paul Haggis

- Best Film
  - 2005 – Crash
- Best Director
  - 2005 – Crash

Rian Johnson

- Best First Film
  - 2006 – Brick
- Best Original Screenplay
  - 2012 – Looper

Quentin Tarantino

- Best Original Screenplay
  - 2009 – Inglourious Basterds
- Best Austin Film
  - 2007 – Grindhouse (Shared with Robert Rodriguez)

=== Actors ===
3 awards
Brie Larson

- Best Actress
  - 2013 – Short Term 12
  - 2015 – Room
- Bobby McCurdy Breakthrough Artist Award
  - 2013 – Short Term 12

2 awards
Timothée Chalamet

- Best Actor
  - 2017 – Call Me by Your Name
- Bobby McCurdy Breakthrough Artist Award
  - 2017 – for his work in Call Me By your Name, and Lady Bird

Jessica Chastain

- Best Supporting Actress
  - 2011 – Take Shelter
- Bobby McCurdy Breakthrough Artist Award
  - 2011 – for her work in The Debt, The Help, Take Shelter, and The Tree of Life

Colin Firth

- Best Actor
  - 2009 – A Single Man
  - 2010 – The King's Speech

Lily Gladstone

- Best Actress
  - 2023 – Killers of the Flower Moon
- Bobby McCurdy Breakthrough Artist Award
  - 2023 – for her work in Killers of the Flower Moon, The Unknown Country, Fancy Dance, and Quantum Cowboys

Anne Hathaway

- Best Actress
  - 2008 – Rachel Getting Married
- Best Supporting Actress
  - 2017 – Les Misérables

Allison Janney

- Best Supporting Actress
  - 2007 – Juno
  - 2017 – I, Tonya

Mikey Madison

- Best Actress
  - 2024 – Anora
- Bobby McCurdy Breakthrough Artist Award
  - 2024 – Anora

Elliot Page ^{[A]}

- Best Actress
  - 2006 – Hard Candy
  - 2007 – Juno

Christoph Waltz

- Best Supporting Actor
  - 2008 – Inglourious Basterds
  - 2012 – Django Unchained

== Top 10 Films of the Decade (2000s) ==
1. Eternal Sunshine of the Spotless Mind (2004)
2. There Will Be Blood (2007)
3. The Lord of the Rings (2001–2003)
4. The Dark Knight (2008)
5. Requiem for a Dream (2000)
6. Kill Bill (2003/4)
7. No Country for Old Men (2007)
8. The Incredibles (2004)
9. Children of Men (2006)
10. Memento (2000) / The Departed (2006) (TIE)

== Top 10 Films of the Decade (2010s) ==
1. Mad Max Fury Road (2015)
2. Moonlight (2016)
3. The Social Network (2010)
4. Get Out (2017)
5. Arrival (2016)
6. The Handmaiden (2016)
7. Parasite (2019)
8. Once Upon a Time in Hollywood (2019)
9. Boyhood (2014)
10. Phantom Thread (2017)

== Notes ==
A: Elliot Page won before his gender transition in 2020.
