= Austin Film Critics Association Award for Best Supporting Actress =

Annual film award

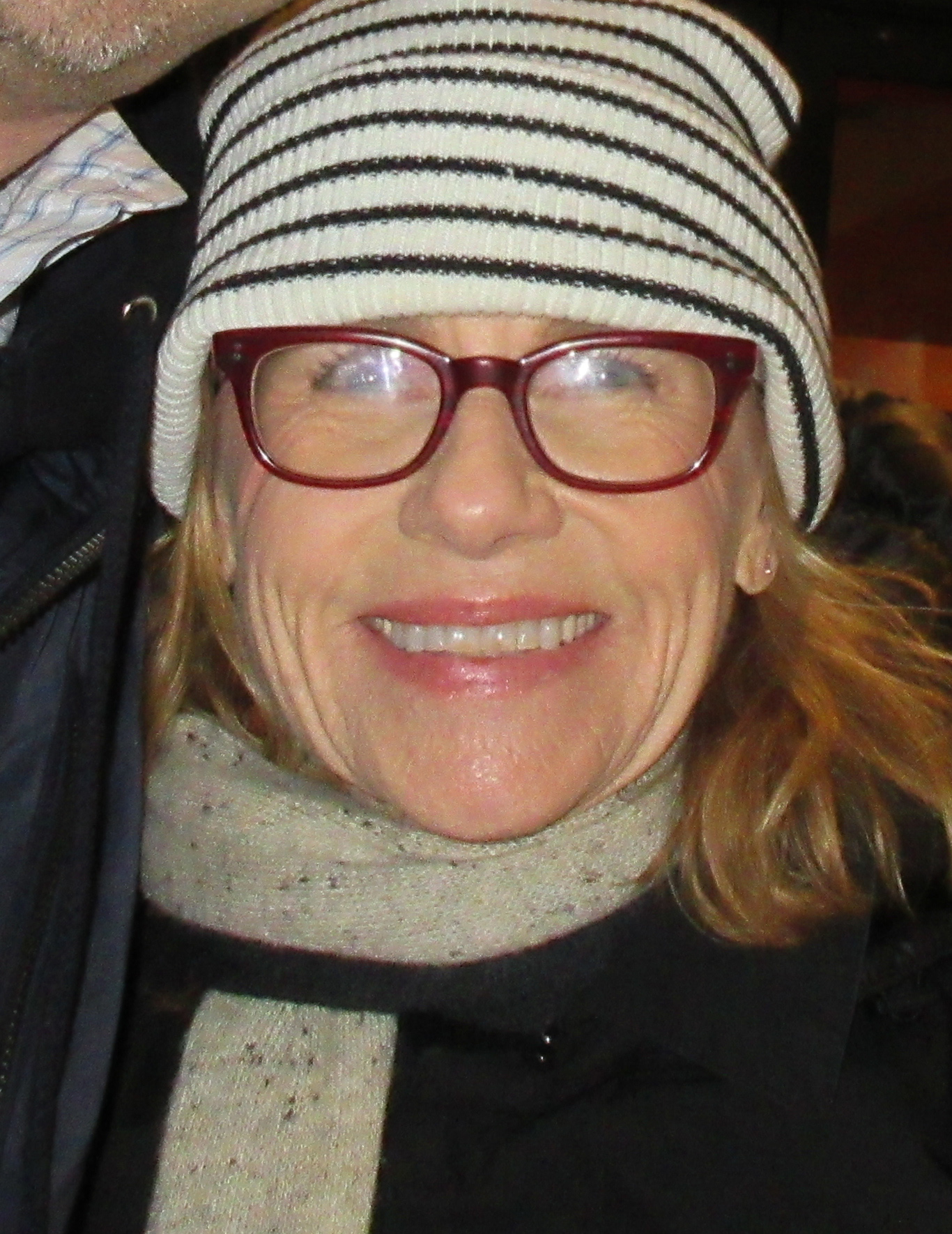
The 2025 recipient: Amy Madigan

The Austin Film Critics Association Award for Best Supporting Actress is one of the annual awards given out by the Austin Film Critics Association.

== Winners ==
=== 2000s ===
Year	Winner	Film	Role
2005	Laura Linney	The Squid and the Whale	Joan Berkman
2006	Rinko Kikuchi	Babel	Chieko Wataya
2007	Allison Janney	Juno	Bren MacGuff
2008	Taraji P. Henson	The Curious Case of Benjamin Button	Queenie
2009	Anna Kendrick	Up in the Air	Natalie Keener

=== 2010s ===
Year	Winner	Film	Role
2010	Hailee Steinfeld	True Grit	Mattie Ross
2011	Jessica Chastain	Take Shelter	Samantha "Sam" LaForche
2012	Anne Hathaway	Les Misérables	Fantine
2013	Lupita Nyong'o	12 Years a Slave	Patsey
2014	Patricia Arquette	Boyhood	Olivia Evans
2015	Alicia Vikander	Ex Machina	Ava
2015	Elizabeth Banks	Love and Mercy	Melinda Ledbetter
2015	Jennifer Jason Leigh	The Hateful Eight	"Crazy" Daisy Domergue
2015	Kristen Stewart	Clouds of Sils Maria	Valentine
2015	Kate Winslet	Steve Jobs	Joanna Hoffman
2016	Viola Davis	Fences	Rose Lee Maxson
2016	Greta Gerwig	20th Century Women	Abbie Porter
2016	Naomi Harris	Moonlight	Paula
2016	Kim Min-hee	The Handmaiden	Lady Izumi Hideko
2016	Michelle Williams	Manchester by the Sea	Randi Ellington
2017	Allison Janney	I, Tonya	LaVona Golden
2017	Mary J. Blige	Mudbound	Florence Jackson
2017	Holly Hunter	The Big Sick	Beth Gardner
2017	Laurie Metcalf	Lady Bird	Marion McPherson
2017	Octavia Spencer	The Shape of Water	Zelda Delilah Fuller
2018	Regina King	If Beale Street Could Talk	Sharon Rivers
2018	Amy Adams	Vice	Lynne Cheney
2018	Claire Foy	First Man	Janet Armstrong
2018	Emma Stone	The Favourite	Abigail Masham
2018	Rachel Weisz	The Favourite	Sarah Curchill
2019	Jennifer Lopez	Hustlers	Ramona Vega
2019	Laura Dern	Marriage Story	Nora Fanshaw
2019	Adèle Haenel	Portrait of a Lady on Fire	Héloïse
2019	Scarlett Johansson	Jojo Rabbit	Rosie Betzler
2019	Florence Pugh	Little Women	Amy Curtis March

=== 2020s ===
Year	Winner	Film	Role
2020	Youn Yuh-jung	Minari	Soon-ja
2020	Maria Bakalova	Borat Subsequent Moviefilm	Tutar Sagdiyev
2020	Olivia Colman	The Father	Anne
2020	Amanda Seyfried	Mank	Marion Davies
2020	Helena Zengel	News of the World	Johanna
2021	Kirsten Dunst	The Power of the Dog	Rose Gordon
2021	Ariana DeBose	West Side Story	Anita
2021	Ann Dowd	Mass	Linda
2021	Kathryn Hunter	The Tragedy of Macbeth	The Three Witches
2021	Ruth Negga	Passing	Claire Bellew
2022	Stephanie Hsu	Everything Everywhere All at Once	Joy Wang / Jobu Tupaki
2022	Kerry Condon	The Banshees of Inisherin	Siobhán Súilleabháin
2022	Jamie Lee Curtis	Everything Everywhere All at Once	Deirdre Beaubeirdre
2022	Janelle Monáe	Glass Onion: A Knives Out Mystery	Helen Brand / Cassandra "Andi" Brand
2022	Keke Palmer	Nope	Emerald "Em" Haywood
2023	Da'Vine Joy Randolph	The Holdovers	Mary Lamb
2023	Emily Blunt	Oppenheimer	Katherine "Kitty Oppenheimer
2023	Danielle Brooks	The Color Purple	Sofia
2023	Rachel McAdams	Are You There God? It's Me, Margaret.	Barbara Simon
2023	Julianne Moore	May December	Gracie Atherton-Yoo
2024	Margaret Qualley	The Substance	Sue
2024	Danielle Deadwyler	The Piano Lesson	Berniece
2024	Ariana Grande	Wicked	Galinda "Glinda" Upland
2024	Felicity Jones	The Brutalist	Erzsébet Tóth
2024	Katy O'Brian	Love Lies Bleeding	Jacqueline "Jackie" Cleaver
2025	Amy Madigan	Weapons	Aunt Gladys
2025	Odessa A'zion	Marty Supreme	Rachel Mizler
2025	Inga Ibsdotter Lilleaas	Sentimental Value	Agnes Borg Pettersen
2025	Wunmi Mosaku	Sinners	Annie
2025	Teyana Taylor	One Battle After Another	Perfidia Beverly Hills
