= Austin Film Critics Association Award for Best Supporting Actor =

Annual film award

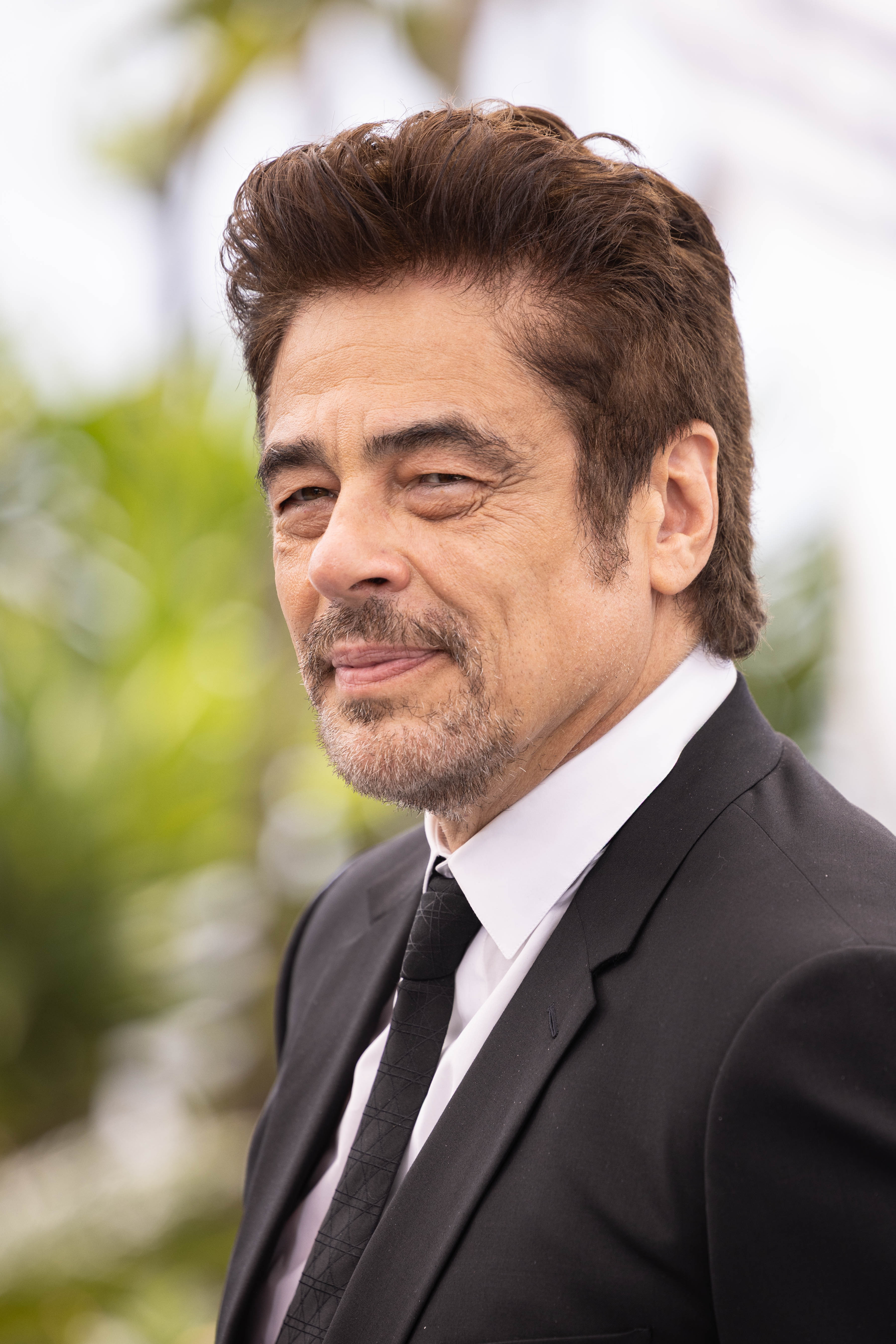
The 2025 recipient: Benicio del Toro

The Austin Film Critics Association Award for Best Supporting Actor is one of the annual awards given out by the Austin Film Critics Association.

== Winners ==
=== 2000s ===
Year	Winner	Film	Role
2005	William Hurt	A History of Violence	Richie Cusack
2006	Jack Nicholson	The Departed	Francis "Frank" Costello
2007	Javier Bardem	No Country for Old Men	Anton Chigurh
2008	Heath Ledger	The Dark Knight	The Joker
2009	Christoph Waltz	Inglourious Bastards	SS Colonel Hans Landa

=== 2010s ===
Year	Winner	Film	Role
2010	Christian Bale	The Fighter	Dick "Dicky" Eklund
2011	Albert Brooks	Dive	Bernie Rose
2012	Christoph Waltz	Django Unchained	Dr. King Schultz
2013	Jared Leto	Dallas Buyers Club	Rayon
2014	J. K. Simmons	Whiplash	Terence Fletcher
2015	Sylvester Stallone	Creed	Robert "Rocky" Balboa
2015	Benicio del Toro	Sicario	Alejandro Gillick
2015	Idris Elba	Beasts of No Nation	Commandant
2015	Oscar Isaac	Ex Machina	Nathan Bateman
2015	Michael Shannon	99 Homes	Rick Carver
2016	Mahershala Ali	Moonlight	Juan
2016	Jeff Bridges	Hell or High Water	Marcus Hamilton
2016	Ben Foster	Hell or High Water	Tanner Howard
2016	Trevante Rhodes	Moonlight	Adult Chiron / "Black"
2016	Michael Shannon	Nocturnal Animals	Detective Bobby Andes
2017	Willem Dafoe	The Florida Project	Bobby Hicks
2017	Armie Hammer	Call Me by Your Name	Oliver
2017	Richard Jenkins	The Shape of Water	Giles
2017	Sam Rockwell	Three Billboards Outside Ebbing, Missouri	Jason Dixon
2017	Michael Stuhlbarg	Call Me by Your Name	Mr. Perlman
2018	Richard E. Grant	Can You Ever Forgive Me?	Jack Hock
2018	Hugh Grant	Paddington 2	Phoenix Buchanan
2018	Michael B. Jordan	Black Panther	N'Jadaka / Erik "Killmonger" Stevens
2018	Brian Tyree Henry	If Beale Street Could Talk	Daniel Carty
2018	Steven Yeun	Burning	Ben
2019	Brad Pitt	Once Upon a Time in Hollywood	Cliff Booth
2019	Willem Dafoe	The Lighthouse	Thomas Wake
2019	Al Pacino	The Irishman	Jimmy Hoffa
2019	Joe Pesci	The Irishman	Russell Bufalino
2019	Song Kang-ho	Parasite	Kim Ki-taek

=== 2020s ===
Year	Winner	Film	Role
2020	Daniel Kaluuya	Judas and the Black Messiah	Fred Hampton
2020	Leslie Odom Jr.	One Night in Miami...	Sam Cooke
2020	Paul Raci	Sound of Metal	Joe
2020	David Strathairn	Nomadland	Dave
2020	Glynn Turman	Ma Rainey's Black Bottom	Toledo
2021	Kodi Smit-McPhee	The Power of the Dog	Peter Gordon
2021	Bradley Cooper	Licorice Pizza	Jon Peters
2021	Colman Domingo	Zola	Abegunde "X" Olawale
2021	Vincent Lindon	Titane	Vincent
2021	Jeffrey Wright	The French Dispatch	Roebuck Wright
2022	Ke Huy Quan	Everything Everywhere All at Once	Waymond Wang
2022	Brendan Gleeson	The Banshees of Inisherin	Colm Doherty
2022	Brian Tyree Henry	Causeway	James Aucoin
2022	Barry Keoghan	The Banshees of Inisherin	Dominic Kearney
2022	Mark Rylance	Bones and All	Sully
2023	Robert Downey Jr.	Oppenheimer	Lewis Strauss
2023	Robert De Niro	Killers of the Flower Moon	William King Hale
2023	Ryan Gosling	Barbie	Ken
2023	Charles Melton	May December	Joe Yoo
2023	Mark Ruffalo	Poor Things	Duncan Wedderburn
2024	Yura Borisov	Anora	Igor
2024	Kieran Culkin	A Real Pain	Benjamin "Benji" Kaplan
2024	Clarence Maclin	Sing Sing	Clarence "Divine Eye" Maclin
2024	Guy Pearce	The Brutalist	Harrison Lee Van Buren Sr.
2024	Jeremy Strong	The Apprentice	Roy Cohn
2025	Benicio del Toro	One Battle After Another	Sensei Sergio St. Carlos
2025	Jacob Elordi	Frankenstein	The Creature
2025	David Jonsson	The Long Walk	Peter "Pete" McVries
2025	Sean Penn	One Battle After Another	Col. Steven J. Lockjaw
2025	Adam Sandler	Jay Kelly	Ron Sukenick
