= Austin Film Critics Association Award for Best Actress =

Annual film award

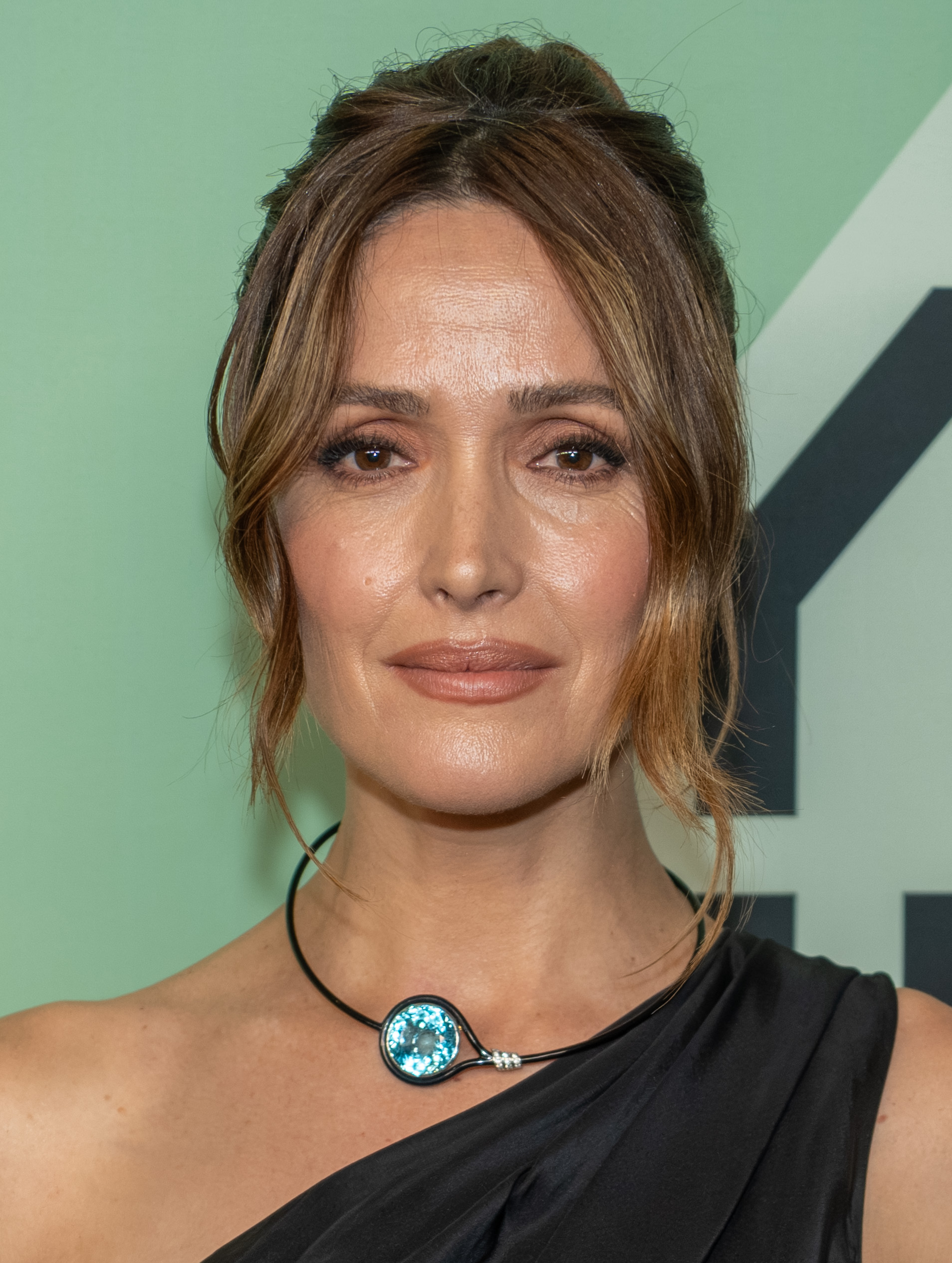
The 2025 recipient: Rose Byrne

The Austin Film Critics Association Award for Best Actress is one of the annual awards given out by the Austin Film Critics Association.

== Winners ==
=== 2000s ===
Year	Winner	Film	Role
2005	Reese Witherspoon	Walk the Line	June Carter
2006	Elliot Page	Hard Candy	Hayley Stark
2007	Elliot Page	Juno	Juno MacGuff
2008	Anne Hathaway	Rachel Getting Married	Kym Buchman
2009	Mélanie Laurent	Inglourious Basterds	Shosanna Dreyfus

=== 2010s ===
Year	Winner	Film	Role
2010	Natalie Portman	Black Swan	Nina Sayers
2011	Tilda Swinton	We Need to Talk About Kevin	Eva Khatchadourian
2012	Jennifer Lawrence	Silver Linings Playbook	Tiffany Maxwell
2013	Brie Larson	Short Term 12	Grace Howard
2014	Rosamund Pike	Gone Girl	Amy Dunne
2015	Brie Larson	Room	Joy "Ma" Newsome
2015	Cate Blanchett	Carol	Carol Aird
2015	Rooney Mara	Carol	Therese Belivet
2015	Saoirse Ronan	Brooklyn	Eilis Lacey
2015	Charlize Theron	Mad Max: Fury Road	Imperator Furiosa
2016	Isabelle Huppert	Elle	Michèle Leblanc
2016	Amy Adams	Arrival	Louise Banks
2016	Annette Bening	20th Century Women	Dorothea Fields
2016	Ruth Negga	Loving	Mildred Loving
2016	Natalie Portman	Jackie	Jacqueline "Jackie" Kennedy
2017	Frances McDormand	Three Billboards Outside Ebbing, Missouri	Mildred Hayes
2017	Sally Hawkins	The Shape of Water	Elisa Esposito
2017	Margot Robbie	I, Tonya	Tonya Harding
2017	Saoirse Ronan	Lady Bird	Christine "Lady Bird" McPherson
2017	Kristen Stewart	Personal Shopper	Maureen Cartwright
2018	Olivia Colman	The Favourite	Anne, Queen of Great Britain
2018	Toni Collette	Hereditary	Annie Graham
2018	Elsie Fisher	Eighth Grade	Kayla Day
2018	Regina Hall	Support the Girls	Lisa Conroy
2018	Melissa McCarthy	Can You Ever Forgive Me?	Lee Israel
2019	Lupita Nyong'o	Us	Adelaide Wilson / Red
2019	Awkwafina	The Farewell	Billi Wang
2019	Scarlett Johansson	Marriage Story	Nicole Barber
2019	Elisabeth Moss	Her Smell	Becky Something
2019	Renée Zellweger	Judy	Judy Garland

=== 2020s ===
Year	Winner	Film	Role
2020	Carey Mulligan	Promising Young Woman	Cassandra "Cassie" Thomas
2020	Nicole Beharie	Miss Juneteenth	Turquoise Jones
2020	Viola Davis	Ma Rainey's Black Bottom	Gertrude "Ma" Rainey
2020	Frances McDormand	Nomadland	Fern
2020	Elisabeth Moss	The Invisible Man	
2021	Agathe Rousselle	Titane	Alexia / Adrien
2021	Olivia Colman	The Lost Daughter	Leda Caruso
2021	Penélope Cruz	Parallel Mothers	Janis Martinez
2021	Alana Haim	Licorice Pizza	Alana Kane
2021	Kristen Stewart	Spencer	Diana, Princess of Wales
2022	Michelle Yeoh	Everything Everywhere All at Once	Evelyn Quan Wang
2022	Cate Blanchett	Tár	Lydia Tár
2022	Viola Davis	The Woman King	General Nanisca
2022	Danielle Deadwyler	Till	Mamie Till-Mobley
2022	Mia Goth	Pearl	Pearl
2023	Lily Gladstone	Killers of the Flower Moon	Mollie Burkhart
2023	Sandra Hüller	Anatomy of a Fall	Sandra Voyter
2023	Greta Lee	Past Lives	Nora Moon
2023	Margot Robbie	Barbie	Barbie
2023	Emma Stone	Poor Things	Bella Baxter
2024	Mikey Madison	Anora	Anora "Ani" Mikheeva
2024	Pamela Anderson	The Last Showgirl	Shelly Gardner
2024	Marianne Jean-Baptiste	Hard Truths	Pansy Deacon
2024	Nicole Kidman	Babygirl	Romy Mars
2024	Demi Moore	The Substance	Elisabeth Sparkle
2025	Rose Byrne	If I Had Legs I'd Kick You	Linda
2025	Jessie Buckley	Hamnet	Agnes Shakespeare
2025	Jennifer Lawrence	Die My Love	Grace
2025	Amanda Seyfried	The Testament of Ann Lee	Ann Lee
2025	Emma Stone	Bugonia	Michelle Fuller
