= Austin Film Critics Association Award for Best Ensemble =

Annual US film award

The Austin Film Critics Association Award for Best Ensemble is an annual award given by the Austin Film Critics Association, honoring the best in ensemble cast. This category was first awarded in 2018.

== Winners ==
indicates the winners.

=== 2010s ===
Year	Winner
2018
2018	Widows
2018	Avengers: Infinity War
2018	Black Panther
2018	Crazy Rich Asians
2018	The Favourite
2019
2019	Knives Out
2019	The Irishman
2019	Little Women
2019	Once Upon a Time in Hollywood
2019	Parasite

=== 2020s ===
Year	Winner
2020
2020	Minari
2020	Da 5 Bloods
2020	Ma Rainey's Black Bottom
2020	One Night in Miami...
2020	The Trial of the Chicago 7
2021
2021	The French Dispatch
2021	Dune
2021	The Harder They Fall
2021	Licorice Pizza
2021	Mass
2022
2022	Everything Everywhere All at Once
2022	The Banshees of Inisherin
2022	The Fabelmans
2022	Glass Onion: A Knives Out Mystery
2022	Women Talking
2023
2023	Oppenheimer
2023	Asteroid City
2023	Barbie
2023	Killers of the Flower Moon
2023	Poor Things
