= Austin Film Critics Association Award for Best Film Editing =

Annual US film award

The Austin Film Critics Association Award for Best Film Editing is an annual award given by the Austin Film Critics Association, honoring the best in film editor. This category was first awarded in 2018.

== Winners ==
Legend:

indicates the winners.

=== 2010s ===
Year	Film	Editor(s)
2018
2018	First Man	Tom Cross
2018	The Favourite	Yorgos Mavropsaridis
2018	If Beale Street Could Talk	Joi McMillon and Nat Sanders
2018	Roma	Alfonso Cuarón and Adam Gough
2018	Widows	Joe Walker
2019
2019	Uncut Gems	Ronald Bronstein and Benny Safdie
2019	1917	Lee Smith
2019	The Irishman	Thelma Schoonmaker
2019	Once Upon a Time in Hollywood	Fred Raskin
2019	Parasite	Yang Jin-mo

=== 2020s ===
Year	Film	Editor(s)
2020
2020	Nomadland	Chloé Zhao
2020	The Father	Yorgos Lamprinos
2020	Mank	Kirk Baxter
2020	Sound of Metal	Mikkel E.G. Nielsen
2020	Tenet	Jennifer Lame
2021
2021	Dune	Joe Walker
2021	The Last Duel	Claire Simpson
2021	Licorice Pizza	Andy Jurgensen
2021	The Power of the Dog	Peter Sciberras
2021	West Side Story	Michael Kahn and Sarah Broshar
2022
2022	Everything Everywhere All at Once	Paul Rogers
2022	Glass Onion: A Knives Out Mystery	Bob Ducsay
2022	RRR	A. Sreekar Prasad
2022	Tár	Monika Willi
2022	Top Gun: Maverick	Eddie Hamilton
2023
2023	Oppenheimer	Jennifer Lame
2023	The Holdovers	Kevin Tent
2023	Killers of the Flower Moon	Thelma Schoonmaker
2023	Maestro	Michelle Tesoro
2023	Poor Things	Yorgos Mavropsaridis

== See also ==
- Academy Award for Best Editing
