= Austin Film Critics Association Award for Best Adapted Screenplay =

Annual US film award

The Austin Film Critics Association Award for Best Adapted Screenplay is an annual award given by the Austin Film Critics Association, honoring the best adapted screenplay.

== Winners ==
=== 2000s ===
Year	Winner	Screenwriter(s)
2005	Brokeback Mountain	Larry McMurtry and Diana Ossana
2006	Children of Men	Alfonso Cuarón, Timothy J. Sexton, David Arata, Mark Fergus, and Hawk Ostby
2007	No Country for Old Men	Joel Coen and Ethan Coen
2008	The Dark Knight	Jonathan Nolan and Christopher Nolan
2009	Up in the Air	Jason Reitman and Sheldon Turner

=== 2010s ===
Year	Winner	Screenwriter(s)
2010	The Social Network	Aaron Sorkin
2011	Drive	Hossein Amini
2012	Argo	Chris Terrio
2013	12 Years a Slave	John Ridley
2014	Gone Girl	Gillian Flynn
2015	Room	Emma Donoghue
2016	Arrival	Eric Heisserer
2017	Call Me by Your Name	James Ivory
2018	If Beale Street Could Talk	Barry Jenkins
2019	Little Women	Greta Gerwig

=== 2020s ===
Year	Winner	Screenwriter(s)
2020	Nomadland	Chloé Zhao
2021	Drive My Car	Ryusuke Hamaguchi and Takamasa Oe
2022	Glass Onion: A Knives Out Mystery	Rian Johnson
2023	Oppenheimer	Christopher Nolan

== See also ==
- Austin Film Critics Association Award for Best Original Screenplay
