= Austin Film Critics Association Awards 2018 =

American film awards event

The 14th Austin Film Critics Association Awards, honoring the best in filmmaking for 2018, were announced on January 7, 2019. The nominees were announced on December 27, 2018.

== Winners and nominees ==
Best Film	Best Director
1. If Beale Street Could Talk; 2. The Favourite; 3. Roma; 4. Blindspotting; 5. You Were Never Really Here; 6. Spider-Man: Into the Spider-Verse; 7. First Reformed; 8. Eighth Grade; 9. Shoplifters; 10. Suspiria	Barry Jenkins – If Beale Street Could Talk; Alfonso Cuarón – Roma; Debra Granik – Leave No Trace; Yorgos Lanthimos – The Favourite; Lynne Ramsay – You Were Never Really Here
Best Actor	Best Actress
Ethan Hawke – First Reformed; Christian Bale – Vice; Bradley Cooper – A Star Is Born; Rami Malek – Bohemian Rhapsody; Joaquin Phoenix – You Were Never Really Here	Olivia Colman – The Favourite; Toni Collette – Hereditary; Elsie Fisher – Eighth Grade; Regina Hall – Support the Girls; Melissa McCarthy – Can You Ever Forgive Me?
Best Supporting Actor	Best Supporting Actress
Richard E. Grant – Can You Ever Forgive Me?; Hugh Grant – Paddington 2; Michael B. Jordan – Black Panther; Brian Tyree Henry – If Beale Street Could Talk; Steven Yeun – Burning	Regina King – If Beale Street Could Talk; Amy Adams – Vice; Claire Foy – First Man; Emma Stone – The Favourite; Rachel Weisz – The Favourite
Best Original Screenplay	Best Adapted Screenplay
Sorry to Bother You – Boots Riley; Eighth Grade – Bo Burnham; The Favourite – Deborah Davis and Tony McNamara; First Reformed – Paul Schrader; Roma – Alfonso Cuarón	If Beale Street Could Talk – Barry Jenkins; BlacKkKlansman – Charlie Wachtel, David Rabinowitz, Kevin Willmott and Spike Lee; Can You Ever Forgive Me? – Nicole Holofcener and Jeff Whitty; The Death of Stalin – Armando Iannucci, David Schneider and Ian Martin; Leave No Trace – Debra Granik and Anne Rosellini
Best Film Editing	Best Ensemble
First Man - Tom Cross; If Beale Street Could Talk - Joi McMillon and Nat Sanders; Roma - Alfonso Cuarón and Adam Gough; The Favourite – Yorgos Mavropsaridis; Widows – Joe Walker	Widows; Avengers: Infinity War; Black Panther; Crazy Rich Asians; The Favourite
Best Animated Film	Best Foreign Language Film
Spider-Man: Into The Spider-Verse; Incredibles 2; Isle of Dogs; Mirai; Ralph Breaks the Internet	Burning; Cold War; The Guilty; Roma; Shoplifters
Best First Film	Best Documentary
Eighth Grade; Hereditary; A Star Is Born; Blindspotting; Sorry to Bother You	Won't You Be My Neighbor?; Free Solo; Minding the Gap; RBG; Shirkers
Best Cinematography	Best Score
Roma – Alfonso Cuarón; Burning – Hong Kyung-pyo; First Man – Linus Sandgren; If Beale Street Could Talk – James Laxton; Widows – Sean Bobbitt	Mandy – Jóhann Jóhannsson; Annihilation – Ben Salisbury and Geoff Barrow; First Man – Justin Hurwitz; If Beale Street Could Talk – Nicholas Britell; Suspiria – Thom Yorke
Best Stunts	Best Motion Capture/Special Effects Performance
Mission: Impossible – Fallout; Black Panther; Mandy; The Night Comes for Us; Upgrade	Josh Brolin - Avengers: Infinity War; Shameik Moore - Spider-Man: Into The Spider-Verse; Sonoya Mizuno - Annihilation; Phoebe Waller-Bridge - Solo: A Star Wars Story; Ben Whishaw - Paddington 2
Bobby McCurdy Memorial Breakthrough Artist Award	Austin Film Award
Brian Tyree Henry – If Beale Street Could Talk, Spider-Man: Into The Spider-Verse and Widows; Yalitza Aparicio – Roma; Jim Cummings – Thunder Road; Elsie Fisher – Eighth Grade; Boots Riley – Sorry to Bother You	Support the Girls – Andrew Bujalski; 1985 – Yen Tan; Call Her Ganda – PJ Raval; Damsel – David Zellner and Nathan Zellner; Run Like the Devil – Steve Mims
Special Honorary Award
To Bo Burnham, Elsie Fisher, Josh Hamilton for their brilliant collaborative work on Eighth Grade.
