= Austin Film Critics Association Award for Best Director =

Annual US film award

The Austin Film Critics Association Award for Best Director is an annual award the Austin Film Critics Association has given out since 2005.

== Winners ==
Year	Winner	Director(s)
2005	Crash	Paul Haggis
2006	Children of Men	Alfonso Cuarón
2007	There Will Be Blood	Paul Thomas Anderson
2008	The Dark Knight	Christopher Nolan
2009	The Hurt Locker	Kathryn Bigelow
2010	Black Swan	Darren Aronofsky
2011	Drive	Nicolas Winding Refn
2012	The Master	Paul Thomas Anderson
2013	Gravity	Alfonso Cuarón
2014	Boyhood	Richard Linklater
2015	Mad Max: Fury Road	George Miller
2016	Moonlight	Barry Jenkins
2017	The Shape of Water	Guillermo del Toro
2018	If Beale Street Could Talk	Barry Jenkins
2019	Parasite	Bong Joon-ho
2020	Minari	Lee Isaac Chung
2021	The Power of the Dog	Jane Campion
2022	Everything Everywhere All At Once	Daniel Kwan and Daniel Scheinert
2023	Oppenheimer	Christopher Nolan
2024	Anora	Sean Baker
2025	One Battle After Another	Paul Thomas Anderson
