= Austin Film Critics Association Award for Best Documentary Film =

Annual US film award

The Austin Film Critics Association Award for Best Film has been annually bestowed on the best film of the year since 2005.

== Winners ==
Year	Winner	Director(s)
2005	Murderball	
2006	This Film Is Not Yet Rated	
2007	The King of Kong: A Fistful of Quarters	
2008	Man on Wire	James Marsh
2009	Anvil! The Story of Anvil	
2010	Exit Through the Gift Shop	Banksy
2011	Senna	
2012	The Imposter	
2013	The Act of Killing	
2014	Citizenfour	
2015	The Look of Silence	
2016	Tower	
2017	Faces Places	Agnes Varda
2018	Won't You Be My Neighbor?	Morgan Neville
2019	Apollo 11	Todd Douglas Miller
2020	Boys State	
2021	Summer of Soul	Questlove
2022	All the Beauty and the Bloodshed	
2023	Still: A Michael J. Fox Movie	
2024	Will & Harper	
