= Austin Film Critics Association Award for Best Film =

Annual film award

The Austin Film Critics Association Award for Best Film has been annually honored the best film of the year since its inception in 2005.

== Winners ==
Year	Winner	Director(s)
2005	Crash	Paul Haggis
2006	United 93	Paul Greengrass
2007	There Will Be Blood	Paul Thomas Anderson
2008	The Dark Knight	Christopher Nolan
2009	The Hurt Locker	Kathryn Bigelow
2010	Black Swan	Darren Aronofsky
2011	Hugo	Martin Scorsese
2012	Zero Dark Thirty	Kathryn Bigelow
2013	Her	Spike Jonze
2014	Boyhood	Richard Linklater
2015	Mad Max: Fury Road	George Miller
2016	Moonlight	Barry Jenkins
2017	Get Out	Jordan Peele
2018	If Beale Street Could Talk	Barry Jenkins
2019	Parasite	Bong Joon-ho
2020	Minari	Lee Isaac Chung
2021	The Power of the Dog	Jane Campion
2022	Everything Everywhere All At Once	Daniel Kwan and Daniel Scheinert
2023	Killers of the Flower Moon	Martin Scorsese
2024	Anora	Sean Baker
2025	One Battle After Another	Paul Thomas Anderson
