= Minjung art =

South Korean art of the Minjung movement

- Hangul: 민중미술
- Hanja: 民衆美術
- Revised Romanization: Minjung misul
- McCune–Reischauer: Minjung misul

Minjung art (Korean: 민중미술) was a social reform movement led by South Korean progressive artists during the 1980s Minjung democracy movement. Minjung artists utilized a wide array of media, including oil painting, woodblock print, collage, photomontage, banner painting, and readymade, in order to respond to the political and social climate of the time. A number of artworks were produced for and used in protests, and thus led artists to use reproducible mediums like print. The artists generally embraced a figurative or narrative style in order to represent the plight and reality of the working class.

Artist collectives played a large role in minjung art, exemplifying the tendency of minjung art to deemphasize individual authorship and maintain a publicly minded ethos. Among them, Reality and Utterance (현실과 발언) was critical of dansaekhwa's turn away from reality, endeavoring to engage reality and expand the boundaries of art. The Association of Gwangju Freedom Artists (광주자유미술인연합회) deployed the notion of “situation” instead of reality, creating situation-specific placards for distribution to activists, for example. In addition to these two major groups, Dureong (두렁; levee) pioneered the use of geolgae geurim (banner painting), which spread to other collectives. Later collectives, such as Ganeunpae (가는패) and the Institute of Social Photography, expanded strategies of “art of the site” by producing banner paintings and photobooks and deploying the mass media both in the form of print and film.

In the early 1990s, "post-minjung" artists took up the mantle to revisit and draw on the movement's legacy. A number of shows both at home and abroad have sought to present and historicize minjung art in spite of its long marginalization in Korean contemporary art history. Recent scholarship has sought to reevaluate minjung art's relationship to the minjung movement, expand its history to consider its presentation abroad, and chart its historical linkages with realist art, as well as more recent contemporary art.

== Terminology ==
=== Minjung ===
Minjung can be literally translated to mean “People/Populace,” but there was never a conclusive consensus of meaning between artists and critics even to this day about which “people” constituted minjung. The word minjung is made up of two Chinese characters and was first used in Korea during the late 1800s to refer to the resistant force against Japanese occupation. In the late 1960s, the term referred to the oppressed social class and pro-democracy protesters during the military dictatorship. Below are a selection of different scholars' takes on who artists were referring to when creating minjung art.

- Beck Jee-soo: considers the minjung as people who are the exploited and oppressed masses while also being the revolutionary subject of social/ political change. She goes further to connect the parallels between the minjung theology of the 1980s to the liberation theology in Latin America which both understood the minjung to be analogous with Jesus’ suffering.
- Han Wan-sung: defines minjung as people in a society who are economically, culturally, and politically deprived of power.
- Park Hyun-chae: uses Marxist distinction between bourgeoisie/proletariat and defines minjung as a byproduct of Korean proletarianization. Park sees the minjung to be the economically oppressed (laborers, armers, poor). He also takes into account how the pre-existing class delineations influenced by Confucian philosophy expedited the proletariat formation during Korean industrialization.
- Kim Hyung-a: sees minjung as a historically specific class that encompassed oppressed peoples sticken by economic struggle and limited personal freedom. To Kim, the idea of minjung coalesced around an emotional response to nationalism, anti-imperialism/capitalism. Like Park, Kim sees minjung as a concept born out of Western philosophy.
- Namhee Lee (born 1960): The professor of modern Korean history at UCLA argues that while the term "minjung" can be translated as "common people," it is an abstract and elastic term that "required a constant shoring up of the counterimage of the forces considered to be inimical to minjung: the military dictatorship, corporate conglomerates, and foreign powers." Therefore, while factory workers and farmers were presented as the face of minjung during the 1970s and 80s, the term later included small business owners and segments of the military.

=== Minjung art ===
Minjung misul, meaning "people's art," was used interchangeably with terms like minjok misul (national art), minjok minjung misul (national people's art), and saeroun misul undong (new art movement). It was only in 1985 that minjung misul became the standard term when a national newspaper wrote about the government censorship of the exhibition "Power of the Twenties (20 dae eui him)." Some artists associated to the movement pushed back against the use of the term.

== History ==
=== Background ===
President Park Chung Hee was assassinated in 1979, and what followed under the military government of Chun Doo-Hwan was a period of political, economic, and social strife, exemplified by the Gwangju Uprising, where over 2000 students and protestors lost their lives. Under these fraught conditions, minjung art of the 1980s began to take form within these protests in the form of ephemeral banners, posters, and pamphlets. Minjung art formed in spite of political repression during the late 70s and 80s, and can be connected to a longer history of art centered on realism in Korea since the early twentieth century. Developing concurrently in literature and art, realism dominated cultural production during the time in response to the political climate.

While the original intent of minjung art was to critique the institutional academic art system, it evolved into a political avant-garde that was active in the pro-democracy movement. Thus minjung artists often saw themselves in contradistinction to dansaekhwa, seeking to counter what they considered to be the latter's distance from the public and lack of overt political engagement. Art historian Chunghoon Shin argues that minjung artists' anti-formalist rhetoric against abstraction was a response to the growing institutionalization of the art world that drew art away from the public.

=== Development and censorship ===
Minjung art emerged in 1979 when artists such as Kim Jeong-heon, O Yoon, and Joo Jae-hwan, along with art critics Seong Wan-gyeong and Choi Min, founded Reality and Utterance. They challenged modernist art that had dominated the Korean art scene through the 1970s. That same year, Hong Seong-dam, Choi Yeol, and others established the Association of Gwangju Freedom Artists, seeking to develop an artistic practice that would contribute to the contemporary movement for ethnic culture. Small art collectives also emerged such as Imsullyeon (임술년) in 1982, Dureong in 1983, and Ganeunpae in 1987.

In 1985, the exhibition Korean Art: The Power of the Twenties was held, but the police sealed off the exhibition venue and forcibly removed more than thirty artworks. This prompted artists who had previously worked in different branches of the movement to unite and establish the Minjok Art Association (민족미술협의회). During the student movement and the Great Workers' Struggle of 1987, large-scale hanging banners and paintings were displayed at protest sites, expanding the movement’s reach among the public. In 1988, the National Federation of Minjung Art Movement (민족민중미술운동전국연합) was formed.

Some works suffered from censorship. In 1989, Shin Hak-chul's 1987 work Rice Planting was confiscated as it was seen as an “expressive work benefiting the enemy” under the National Security Act. In 1990, Yoon Beom-mo, the head of the Art Department at the Seoul Arts Center, resigned in protest against interference by the government and the Seoul Arts Center in exhibitions of Minjung art.

=== Internal conflict and decline ===
The growing prominence of minjung art and integration into social spheres in turn provoked disagreements over the systemization and institutionalization of minjung art, and produced a generational divide.

In the early 1990s, the movement weakened following the end of the Cold War and the rise to power of figures associated with the democratization movement. The growing stronghold of consumerism in Korea and official acceptance of minjung art also contributed to its decline. However, for a short period of time, younger minjung artists utilized montage and kitsch in an attempt to reformulate minjung art.

== Notable groups ==
Minjung art can be examined from two main perspectives: a critical reassessment of existing art and the role of art as a form of cultural activism. Groups such as Reality and Utterance and Imsullyeon engaged in artistic practices that criticized historical and social themes, urban life and popular culture, and the realities of capitalism. In contrast, Dureong and the Association of Gwangju Freedom Artists sought to communicate directly with the public and believed that art should contribute to social transformation. They established citizens’ printmaking workshops and also engaged in activities at workplaces, combining work and play with traditional cultural practices such as talchum (Korean mask dance). The former is sometimes referred to as gallery art (전시장 미술), and the latter as site art (현장 미술).

=== Reality and Utterance ===
During the first meeting of Reality and Utterance in 1979, members criticized what they saw as dansaekhwa's turn away from reality. This interest in how to define and engage with reality and thus expand the boundaries of art led Reality and Utterance artists to declare their intentions through a manifesto, refer to mass media and consumerism through material and form in their work, and organize group shows beginning in November 1980. By the mid-1980s they organized an umbrella organization in response to government censorship of realist art, but faced accusations of elitism.

Art historians have typically considered Reality and Utterance's anti-modernist work as preceding the later development of hyeonjang misul (art of the site) made for and used at protests.

=== The Association of Gwangju Freedom Artists ===
The Association of Gwangju Freedom Artists (광주자유미술인연합회) demonstrated a concurrent vested interest in creating work reacting to and functioning in particular situations—belying the art historical claim that anti-modernist artistic practice in 1979 laid the necessary groundwork for hyeonjang misul (art of the site). The Gwangju artists favored the term sanghwang (situation) over hyeonsil (reality) when writing their own manifesto—delineating a difference between the two that was reflected in their activities as a group in the aftermath of the Gwangju Uprising. They responded to the specific situation by creating placards and distributing them to activists, and spraying slogans around the city. After the Uprising, and in contrast to Reality and Utterance, the association eschewed a typical indoor art exhibition for kut, a shamanistic ritual of mourning (1980), and outdoor show with over a hundred visitors looking at paintings and performances (1981).

The members of the association distanced themselves further from established art institutions by concerning themselves with pedagogy in open schools and public engagement with the arts. Their interest in education, influenced by recently translated texts like Paolo Freire's Pedagogy of the Oppressed, reimagined the artist as facilitators for minjung to produce their own work. The importance of accessibility and deemphasis of the individual artist with reproducibility led them to embrace woodblock printing.

=== Dureong ===
Other elements of minjung art were also present during the time, such as the use of geolgae geurim (banner painting) by the collective Dureong (Levee), and which then spread to other collectives like the Association of Gwangju Freedom Artists. Buddhist painting inspired the composition and collective approach in making banner paintings. Leader of Dureong Kim Bongjun's Painting of All Things Heaven and Earth (1982) evinces Buddhist influences and the language of folklore that were often in play for banner paintings. The repetition of motifs and dissolution of individual authorship, and emphasis on the site of the banner in constructing its meaning, all evince an interest in the specificity of place and adaptability that was crucial to later minjung art. Dureong also worked with local communities in lieu of galleries to create woodblock prints, illustrations, cartoons, banner paintings, and murals.

Some critics, including Reality and Utterance member Sung Wankyung, accused minjung artists and groups like Dureong of political kitsch and romanticizing folk traditions. This interest in the past stood in contrast to shifting political discourse in the late 1980s marked by the June Democratic Uprising in 1987 when the worker became the locus of political discussions rather than minjung.

== Characteristics ==
=== Artistic and political ideas and influences ===
Some of the earliest minjung art took inspiration from Mexican muralists, the Chinese wood printing movement, and socialist realism. Their work highlighted subject matter, narration, and viewer legibility. The stories they would depict were often of Korean martyrs, ills of capitalism, the plight of the poor, corrupt officials, and other politically charged scenes. Folk art, Buddhist art, woodcuts, genre paintings, and other marginalized art forms not deemed “fine art” were used to reject the western-imported sensibilities of abstract art that was supported by the government and to bolster a sense of nationalism against foreign influence. With that said, minjung artists weren't entirely opposed to Western modernist aesthetics and theory, but they were extremely critical of Korean modernists at the time who passively adopted modernism as a way to make “art for arts sake” and cater to the sensibilities of the rich/ government- especially in the wake of massive socio-political turmoil.

In comparison to modernist artists who were devoted to formalism, minjung art was seen by the Korean press as naive, clumsy, propaganda art. In the newspaper, minjung art was covered in the political section, not the art/culture section. Minjung art was viewed primarily in the streets rather than museums or galleries. Minjung artists were socially and politically invested and held leftist tendencies, which directly conflicted with the military dictatorship at the time and made artists targets for arrest and torture. Artists addressed the struggles of the lower class and the corruption of the government and violent hegemony of capitalism.

=== Photographic reproduction and realism ===
Photography often worked in conjunction with painting and printing to represent and convey the need to fight for democracy. Choi Byung Soo's (born 1960) 1987 paintings and prints reproducing Reuters News Agency photographer Jung Tae Won's photo of Yonsei University student Lee Hanyeol transformed the image into the symbol of the democracy movement. Choi's painting became the centerpiece of the public mourning procession in July 1987 for those who were killed during the June Democratic Uprising, and was thus visible to more than a million people However its visibility also heightened its vulnerability—the painting was attacked twice, once in 1988 with a teargas bomb, and again in 2004 with a knife.

=== Cinema ===
With the advent of video technology and aid of distribution through the union network, minjung filmmakers sought to critique modern-day Korean society by capturing on film the difficulties the lower strata of Korean society faced. They were able to reach a wide array of audiences for low cost, leading to directors like Kim Dongwon and leftist filmmaking groups like Labor News Collective (Nodongja nyusu chejakdan) to experiment with the medium.

=== Relationship to Minjok art ===
Minjok art (national art) also used art to directly participate in political actions by way of traditional national art forms in the 1980s. While they are often conflated, Minjok art addressed anti-imperialism from a national perspective, while minjung art held a more broad anti-imperialist, anti-monopoly, and anti-capitalist stance. Minjok and minjung artists, while sharing some common aims, and in some cases could be referred to interchangeably, were fiercely opposed to being read as being the same or similar to one another.

== Legacy ==
=== Post-minjung art ===
Critics proposed the term "post-minjung art" in the late 1990s. The controversial term became a point of discussion in the Korean contemporary art world by 2008. While art historian Sohl Lee critiques the post-minjung art discourse as often limited to rhetoric at the cost of a careful examination of the older generation of artworks themselves, she sees value in considering the complex web of connections between minjung and post-minjung art.

Artist Young Min Moon considers collectives like Seongnam Project (1998-9), flyingCity (2001-ongoing), and mixrice as drawing from the history of minjung art, and others like Ipgim (breath) as challenging the legacy of male-dominated minjung art. In addition to Seongnam Project and flying City, Chunghoon Shin considers Choi Jeonghwa (born 1961) as carrying on the legacy of Reality and Utterance.

=== Historicization ===
Young Min Moon asserts that minjung art is difficult to define, siding with art historian Park Shin Eui in claiming that minjung art is less of "a style; it was more a cultural movement than an art trend." Chunghoon Shin seeks to uncouple minjung art from its association with the minjung movement, arguing that the linkage often belies the diversity of works, ideas, and motives, but also how they shifted over time.

Sohl Lee's description of minjung art's complicated relationship to politics offers one reason as to why it may be difficult to offer a straightforward or simplistic narrative for the movement:

Born as a visual language of dissent opposing the anticommunist, authoritarian government, minjung art thus assumed, for better or worse, an assertive presence as fierce, symbolic, nationalist, androcentric, and at times as hackneyed and didactic as the dominant power it sought to oppose.

For several decades, minjung art had a marginal place in Korean art history due to state intervention shutting down exhibitions, confiscating artworks, and detaining artists, lack of academics interested in the topic, and exclusion of the topic in textbooks. Critiques of minjung art tend to fall into two lines of thought: the art movement was unable to bridge the divide between art and the sociopolitical context at the time, or that the historical obsolescence of minjung art in a rapidly globalizing world obviates the need to study it now.

Notable critics who have written about minjung art include Sung Wankyung, Kim Yoonsu, and Won Dongsuk.

== Exhibitions ==
=== South Korea ===
The first state-sponsored retrospective of minjung art at the National Museum of Contemporary Art in 1994, titled "The 15 Years of Minjung Art (1980-1994)," included over 400 works by around 300 artists. The show signaled a shift in the Korean government's stance towards minjung art towards official acceptance, which for some signified minjung art's death A number of minjung artists and critics took issue with the show's lack of comprehensiveness, women artists, and new frameworks to understand minjung art.

=== North Korea ===
In 1989, North Korean artists reproduced The History of the Liberation Movement, a set of eleven paintings created over three months by more than 200 South Korean artists, and then subsequently destroyed several months later by the police. The reproduction was shown in North Korea for an exhibition dedicated to Korean reunification.

=== Japan ===
In 1986, the Japan, Afro-Asian, Latin American Artists' Association (JAALA) invited Kim Jungheun and a number of other Reality and Utterance artists including Min Jeongki, Song Changsup, and Lim Oksang to participate in a group show at the Tokyo Metropolitan Museum of Art.

A 2005 traveling exhibition titled "Art Toward the Society: Realism in Korean Art 1945-2005" showed at five museums in Japan.

=== Canada and the US ===
In 1987, artist Um Hyuk and Sung Wan Kyung curated the first show of minjung art in North America titled "Min Joong Art: New Movement of Political Art from Korea" (A Space, Toronto; Minor Injury, Brooklyn). While the initial iterations of the show included only four artists (O Yun, Park Buldong, Jung Boksu, and Sung Neung-kyung), Um and Sung worked with artist Bahc Yiso to organize a larger show at Artists Space in New York. The 1988 Artists Space show featured work by Choi Byung Soo, Dureong, Jung Boksoo, Kim Yongtai, Gwangju Visual Art Research Institute, Lee Jonggu, Lim Oksang, Min Jeongki, Oh Yoon, Park Buldong, The Photo Collective for Social Movement, People's Art School, and Song Chang.

Sohl Lee curated the exhibition "Being Political Popular: South Korean Art at the Intersection of Popular Culture and Democracy, 1980-2010," in 2012 at the University Art Gallery (UAG), University of California, Irvine (UCI), which included minjung artists, and reconsidered the relationship between minjung art and art that emerged in later decades, or as Lee frames it, between popular culture and democratic participation.

=== Germany ===
Beck Jee-sook curated "Battle of Visions" for the Frankfurt Book Fair in 2005, pairing minjung art with work by younger artists drawing on the historical movement. Beck also organized the show "Activating Korea: Tides of Collective Action" in 2007 in New Zealand.

== Notable individual artists ==
- Shin Hak-chul (1943-)
- Kim Jeong-heon (1946-)
- O Yoon (1946–1986)
- Hong Song-dam (1955-)

== See also ==
- Minjung
