= Shin Hak-chul =

South Korean artist (born 1943)

- Born: 12 December 1943 (age 82); Gimcheon County, Keishōhoku-dō, Korea
- Education: Hongik University
- Occupation: Artist

Korean name
- Hangul: 신학철
- Hanja: 申鶴澈
- RR: Sin Hakcheol
- MR: Sin Hakch'ŏl

Shin Hak-chul (Korean: 신학철; Hanja: 申鶴澈, b. Keishōhoku-dō, 12 December 1943) is a representative South Korean minjung artist known for his photo collage and montage works on Korean modern and contemporary history and social injustice. Shin Hak-chul trained in oil painting and applied modernist techniques to realist themes in the 1970s to create a unique style of history painting from the 1980s.

From the democratic movements of the 1980s, Shin focused on creating works that directly addressed history as experienced by the Korean masses and criticize imperialism, political repression, military dictatorship, exploitation of labourers, corruption, capitalism, consumerism, industrialisation, urbanization, as well as cultural imperialism.

== Early life and stylistic development ==
Shin Hak-chul was born in Gimcheon County, Keishōhoku-dō, Korea, Empire of Japan on 12 December 1943.

Shin studied oil painting and graduated from Hongik University in 1968. In addition to his career as an artist, he taught painting in high schools from the 1970s to the 1980s.

He became a member of the Korean avant-garde artist group, "AG", and took part in group exhibitions from 1969 to 1975. His early works of the 1970s such as The City I Live In (내가 사는 도시, 1967) and Emergency Escape (비상탈출, 1971) show signs of influence from pop art and surrealism. However, over time he created a ‘postmodernist realism’ that combined the principles and forms of modernist art with the realism art movement.

Though he was a member of AG, Shin was not completely absorbed with modernist styles, he was also drawn to works by Raphael (1483-1520) and Jean-François Millet (1814-1875) which emphasised the reality of life.

After the disbandment of AG in 1975 and his own departure from formal modernism, he freely utilised photorealism, surrealism, montage, and collage using commercial images from advertisements and journalistic photographs in formulating his style of history paintings to raise awareness on what he considered to be the evils of Korean society from the 1980s. His series, Modern Korean History (한국근대사, 1980–1987) of the 1980s and Contemporary Korean History (한국현대사, 1988–1998) of the 1990s form the main branch of his works. Shin was heavily impacted by Sajin euro bon Hanguk 100-nyeonsa (사진으로 본 한국 100년사), a book published by Donga Ilbo that exposed the devastating reality faced by Korean peasants and labourers in the late 1970s. Shin held his first solo exhibition at Seoul Museum (서울미술관) in 1982, was invited to participate in Seoul Arts Center's group exhibition series, 'Critical Artists' (문제작가, 1981–1984), and was selected the first recipient of the Art Journalist Award (미술기자상) that was awarded by reporters of daily newspapers.

There was a sharp divide in the Korean art scene from the 1970s to the 1980s; on one side were Korean abstract artists and on the other, minjung artists. Shin employed realism in his artworks to raise awareness on the injustice lived by the social classes that were neglected from mainstream social, political, and economic developments and decision-making. Like many other minjung artists, Shin recognized the importance of visual imagery in mass media as a vessel of communication with the masses and collaged images from women's magazines to deliver direct messages of criticism. However, unlike the majority of minjung artists, Shin employed Western painting styles and photography in his works, which was criticised by the majority of his contemporaries. In experimenting with more conventional styles used in minjung art, Shin drew inspiration from the kitsch and photorealist paintings hung up on barber shops and painted Rice Planting (모내기, 1987, repainted in 1993) that formed part of Modern Korean History series.

== Approach to Minjung issues ==
The violent oppression of the Gwangju Democratic Movement of May 1980 fuelled the so-called Minjung Cultural Movement (Minjung munhwa undong, 민중문화운동) which encompassed fields of history, aesthetics, philosophy, humanities, religion, media, and education, but the visual arts was the most powerful and pragmatic means to navigating the direction of the cultural movement. The movement saw the Korean public or masses as the protagonists of history and was focused on studying the social value and lives of labourers, farmers, the urban poor, with the ultimate goal of developing and strengthening the collective struggle against the social elite and to achieve political and cultural resistance.

Shin Hak-chul had supple knowledge on Western modern and contemporary art and socio-political issues and incorporated this to his critiques on the prevalent cultural imperialism that accompanied the rise of capitalism, consumerism, Industrialisation, and Westernization in South Korea in the 1980s after a wave of rapid economic development. He was particularly critical of the American influence in South Koreans and regarded global companies and mass-produced commodities as an embodiment of economic neo-imperialism. In his series, Modern Korean History and Contemporary Korean History, Shin used vivid, realistic visual images to portray the explicit reality of Korean society in which American products and fetishism has overtaken the minds of the Korean 'minjok' (민족, 民族, nation, people) and transformed society into an inferno. Shin Hak-chul traces the origin of these threats to South Korean governance tainted by the travesty of the Korean War (1950-1953), which was in turn, caused by the history of colonial occupation by Japanese Imperialist forces.

Like the majority of minjung artists, Shin also particularly criticized capitalism and the dangers it posed as an American neo-imperialist force in Korean society. Mass production and consumption on a national and international scale, the greed and monopoly of international conglomerates, and the subsequent subordination of smaller and weaker economies to the developed Western powers were perceived by minjung artists as the greatest threat to the Korean people, and Shin Hak-chul was in favour of constructing a socialist society where an egalitarian economy was fused with a people-centric nationalistic ideology to enforce an autonomous identity of the South Korean masses. The demonization of capitalism, industrialization, and consumerism can be spotted in the majority of Shin's work throughout his career.

Though Shin Hak-chul advocated for the socially neglected and weak, his works have also been subject to criticism in light of his use of women in his painting subjects and in his patriarchical interpretations of progress and resistance. The deep-rooted minjung affiliation to the mother and maternal love also frequent appeared as the subject of Shin Hak-chul's works. In Great Land (대지, 1984), Shin depicts a mother with a determined look on her face, carrying her young son on her back as if she is sprouting from the fertile soil, while the title refers to the idea of 'Mother Earth.' Here, the mother is Park Kyongni (박경리, 朴景利, 1926–2008), celebrated author of the novel series Toji (토지, The Land, 1969–1994), while the son on her back is her son-in-law and poet Kim Chi-ha (1941-2022), known for his active political and cultural resistance against dictatorship from the 1960s. Though Park Kyongni is one of the most well-known and revered author in South Korea to this day, in Shin Hak-chul's painting, she is depicted as a mother, caring and struggling to protect the ‘son,’ Kim Chi-ha. Maternal love, devotion, and dedication for the minjung movement by the nurturing of resistant ‘warriors’ was a common theme in not only minjung art but also Fascist propaganda, and reveal the androcentric perception of women as supplementary devices in minjung art of the 1980s. Moreover, his series, Modern Korean History has been accused of fetishization of the female body and phallic representations used to express associations of masculine energy with resistance and heroism.

== Korean history series ==
In the series Modern Korean History of the 1980s, Shin calls out the corruption, commercial decadence, and the depravity of ethics in Korean society and warns of the forthcoming annihilation of national pride and collective identity through collage of dark and solemn images. The series loosely revolves around events from the end of the Joseon period (조선, 朝鮮, 1392–1897) and the colonial period (1910-1945) to the division of the Korean Peninsula. In Modern Korean History, human bodies, animals, and machinery are jumbled in a space consumed by different times, growing into a grotesque biomass. The surreal scene presents a distorted view of past, present, and future that amplify the horrors brought by the historic injustice and repression of the colonial period and the Korean War, as well as dictatorship, capitalism, consumerism, Westernization, and neo-imperialism. Sexualized, photorealist male and female body parts reminiscent of the style of Francis Bacon (1909-1992) amplify the distorted, hedonistic pursuit of human desires and the injustice and corruption of both the body and political regimes. In depicting dead bodies, Shin referred to documentary photographs of the 1923 Kantō Massacre of Koreans after the Great Kantō Earthquake and photographs from the Korean War, resulting in a visual tapestry of the major historical events that explain the struggle of the Korean masses and the interplay between past and present events, morphing into a monstrous creature.

‘Chohon-gok’ (초혼곡), a sub-group of works from the Contemporary Korean History series was focused on exposing the fraudulence of South Korean post-war agendas to correct and settle past history (역사청산작업). For instance, Shin attempted to reinvigorate the images of individuals that led the Gwangju Democratic Movement that had become ‘monumentalized’ as selfless protectors of democracy and faceless victims of a vague historic atrocity that have come to be experienced only in museums or memorials by depicting individual faces bloodied and dishevelled from real and violent torture by their own government and nation. Gapdoli-Gapsuni (2002) that stretched over 20 meters was a continuation of Shin's rhetoric on remnant problems faced in a democratized Korea and a macroscopic visual overview of Korean history and the struggles of the masses. The mural-like, panoramic painting laid out scenes from the 1960s to the 2010s, and included contemporary themes of Korean conglomerates and mass ‘candle demonstrations’ (촛불집회) that began in the 2000s. Shin argued that despite feats in democratization, the ‘historical trauma’ of the violence of capitalism and political oppression in Korean society remains and with the wave of neoliberalism from the 1990s, the obsession to accumulate wealth, exploit and repress, as well as invade the subconsciousness of the masses still endanger Korean society and ordinary people. Shin's composition transitioned from vertical to horizontal as he progressed from Modern Korean History to Contemporary Korean History, and the focus shifted from the collective masses to specific events and memories of individuals who composed the masses.

== The confiscation of Rice Planting ==
Rice Planting was exhibited in a group exhibition titled, 'Tongil Misuljeon' (통일미술전, Reunification Art Exhibition, 1987), hosted by Korean People's Artists Association (민족미술협의회, 民族美術協議會, 1985–1995). On the upper half is a scene where farmers joyfully commence in collective labour against a backdrop of the picturesque Baekdusan Mountain (백두산; 白頭山) that represents Korean ethno-national identity, while a tired farmer in the lower half is pushing garbage consisting of various Westsern commodities out into the ocean. The painting expresses a desire for an autonomous reunification and a peaceful life of the collective nation, free from external threats that are symbolised by commodites such as Coca-Cola bottles and cigaretts. A frame is painted into the scene, similar to the format of Korean ‘barbershop paintings.’ The painting was confiscated in 1989 by the South Korean government and kept in storage as it was interpreted as propaganda praising North Korea.

== Recent works ==
In the 2010s, Shin revisited historic memories of oppression and violence, such as in the case of the Great Earthquake of Gwandong (Great Kantō Earthquake, 관동대지진, 2012). In this image, bodies and victims of not only the 1923 massacre but those of the Gwangju Uprising are spread out in dystopia stretching across time and space. Shin continues to create highly political paintings that frequently criticize the conservative party and administrations, and has addressed controversial events such as the U.S. beef protest in 2008 and the sinking of the Sewol ferry in 2014.

Compared to some minjung artists who produced pragmatic works used for actual demonstrations and other real-life events related to social movementes, Shin Hak-chul was commercially successful and is professionally acclaimed as a representative artist of the minjung art movement.

== Awards ==
Shin won various awards including:

- first Art Journalist Award (미술기자상, 1982)
- first Minjok Art Prize (민족미술상, 1991)
- the sixteenth Gumho Art Prize (금호미술상, 1999)
