= Nobuyuki Ōura =

Japanese artist

Nobuyuki Ōura (大浦信行, Ōura Nobuyuki, born 1949, Toyama) is a Japanese artist and filmmaker who has been referred to in English as Ohura Nobuyuki. He has been described as an artist who "constantly pushes the limits of expression," as his artworks and films delve into taboos within Japanese society. Ōura is best known for his controversial series of lithographs entitled Holding Perspective (1982–85), which include photographs of Emperor Hirohito, and have at been at the center of multiple high-profile censorship incidences in Japan since the mid-1980s.

== Early life and career ==
Ōura was born in Toyama City (Toyama Prefecture) in 1949. He studied economics at Kokugakuin University in Tokyo's Shibuya district, where in the late 1960s he began making paintings. He moved to the United States in 1975, where he lived in New York City until 1985.

After living in New York for two years, Ōura was introduced to and began working as a studio assistant for the renowned Japanese artist and architect Shūsaku Arakawa. He started out by helping Arakawa repaint his studios, and then began to work for him full-time, restoring his old paintings and helping him with new works. Oura was Arakawa's sole assistant from 1977 to 1984. In interviews, he has stated that working for Arakawa during those years influenced his approach to expression and art making.

== Holding Perspective (1982-1985) ==
Ōura's best known artwork is Holding Perspective (遠近を抱えて, Enkin o kakaete), a series of 14 lithographic and silkscreened prints produced by the artist between 1982 and 1985 (See images from Holding Perspective here).

These prints included images of the Shōwa Emperor (Hirohito) during various stages of his life, and included photographs taken on the emperor's pre- and post-war visits to the US and Europe. The images were cropped and superimposed with a mixture of Asian and Western imagery, including rural scenes, traditional Japanese scrolls, Buddhist mandalas, Biblical images, tattooed and nude bodies, skeletons, brains, cross sections of the human body, and symbols of the Pacific War, such as a mushroom cloud. In his collages, Ōura consciously treated the images and icons in each composition as equivalents, with no value hierarchy among them. He produced the series over the course of three years using both lithographic and silk screening techniques, returning to Japan intermittently to print them. Ōura first showed prints from Holding Perspective in a solo exhibition at Gallery Yamaguchi in Tokyo in 1984.

=== Concept ===
While living in New York, Ōura decided to create a self-portrait in a series of prints that utilized photographs of the Shōwa Emperor. Through his years of living in the U.S., Ōura gained an objective distance that enabled him to reconsider his own identity and sense of dislocation as a Japanese national. He created the series as a way to delve into techniques undertaken by Japanese society and specifically the emperor, to absorb and assimilate into Western culture during the postwar period. This sentiment was implied in the title of the series; Ōura has stated that he wanted to “reverse the perspective we have learned from the West” and “hold that perspective on his own shoulders and walk forward.” Ōura chose images of Hirohito photographed wearing Western clothing, demonstrating the shift in the emperor's military dress before/during the Pacific War to civilian clothes in the postwar decades.

Art historian Kenji Kajiya analyzed Holding Perspective for a workshop on modern and contemporary East Asian Art held at New York University in 2005, interpreting the series as Ōura's “postcolonial reconsideration of modern Japan's effort to assimilate into Western culture.” Kajiya asserted that Ōura's use of Emperor Hirohito's photograph in these self-portraits was a way to explore the awkwardness the artist experienced during his ten-year stay in New York as a non-Western person becoming more and more assimilated into Western culture. Ōura has explained in his own words that, “there's an inner emperor inside of me that cannot be denied even if I attempt to refuse it.” Most of the prints from the series carefully superimposed photographs of Emperor Hirohito in ways that highlighted his activities, dress, and stylization over the years against a variety of images and motifs that demonstrated Ōura's absorption in Western art techniques, such as sexual and racial fetishizations of the gaze and fragmentation of the human form (especially female) found in the work of Western artists such as Man Ray. By juxtaposing photographs of the emperor's increasingly apparent Westernization in the postwar years with imagery that explored the complexities of Japanese culture and values, the artist considered his own mimicry of dominant Western culture and techniques.

=== Critical reception and censorship ===
Ōura's Holding Perspective outraged Japanese conservatives for depicting the emperor in what they considered a disrespectful or negative light and has been subjected to censorship multiple times, most prominently in 1986 in a mediatized incident that resulted in a court trial addressing the censorship of artistic expression. Although the series is often described as being about or critiquing Japan's emperor system, Ōura has maintained that the series was actually created as a form of self-portraiture. However, despite the artists' intentions, Holding Perspective is visually loaded with imagery and nuances that have sparked rightwing anger in Japan since the mid-1980s. In particular, an image of Hirohito next to the nude image of a woman, and another with a mushroom cloud seeming to emerge from Hirohito's cropped head.

==== Toyama Prefectural Museum of Modern Art and Censorship Trial 1986-2000 ====
In March 1986, Ōura exhibited ten works from Holding Perspective at the Toyama Prefectural Museum of Modern Art in a month-long group show Art in Toyama '86, a biannual exhibition featuring 30 artists from Toyama Prefecture. The museum purchased four of the pieces and arranged for Ōura to donate the remaining six to the museum, and the exhibition concluded without any incident.

However, two months after its conclusion, rightwing groups began to aggressively protest Holding Perspective, and Ōura's artwork was criticized at the Toyama Prefectural Assembly as unpleasant, disgraceful, and unpatriotic for its alleged mocking of the emperor. In July 1986, 52 trucks with loudspeakers and 220 protestors from more than 30 political groups gathered to protest the Toyama prefectural government and museum, insisting that Ōura's artwork be destroyed immediately and that museum director resign. This wave of backlash was so aggressive that the museum director Ogawa Masataka (who was appointed by the prefectural governor) was prompted to withhold the four acquisitions from public display and unexpectedly return the six donated prints back to the artist. The museum as well as the Toyama Prefectural Library made the exhibition's illustrated catalogue unavailable to the public.

The exhibition's catalogue was finally made available to the public again four years later in 1990, following a consistent outpouring of criticism by supporters of the artist, the Japan Library Association, and appeals to freedom of expression by Social Democratic Party assemblyman Ishiguro Kazuo. However, after the catalogue was put back into public circulation, an ultranationalist Shinto priest named Itō Katsuhiro destroyed the catalogue pages that reproduced Ōura's artwork at the Prefectural Library. The library renounced its claim to ownership of the catalogue in its collection and declined all offers made by citizens to donate their own catalogue copies as replacements. Finally in 1993, it was revealed that the museum had sold the four pieces of Ōura's Holding Perspective series in its collection to an anonymous buyer and burned all 470 copies of the catalogue left in its possession.

In 1994, Ōura and his supporters filed a lawsuit against the prefecture to demand that the museum regain the sold pieces and reprint the exhibition catalogue. The trial took more than six years, making its way all the way to the Supreme Court which dismissed the case in February 2000. This meant a total defeat for Ōura. Afterward, the artist commented, "it is quite strange that the artworks bought by an administrative cultural institution using taxpayer money could be kept private and sold to anonymous individuals without public knowledge." Throughout the trial, Ōura maintained that the work was not critiquing the emperor or attempting to be unpatriotic, but rather was a self-critique as a citizen of modern Japanese society.

Since 2000, no public museum in Japan has exhibited or possessed Ōura's Holding Perspective.

==== Okinawa Prefectural Art Museum 2009 ====
Ōura's Holding Perspective became the subject of controversy again when it was excluded from the group show "Into the Atomic Sunshine: Postwar Art under Japanese Peace Constitution Article 9” at the Okinawa Prefectural Art Museum in 2009. The exhibition was organized by independent curator Watanabe Shinya and aimed to shed light on Japan's war history. Two artists previously censored in Japan for their engagement with war-related topics were included: Ōura and Yanagi Yukinori. The exhibition was first shown at the Puffin Room in New York's SoHo district; it was then brought to Japan and presented at the Hillside Gallery in Daikanyama, Tokyo in 2008 without any major incident. However, the Okinawa Prefectural Art Museum's Director, Makino Hirotaka, decided against the inclusion of Ōura's work two months before the exhibition opening, citing "educational consideration" as the reason. Makino insists that the decision to remove Holding Perspective from the exhibition was voluntarily made by Watanabe himself, but it has been since revealed that Watanabe was under pressure to either exclude Ōura or cancel the exhibition entirely.

To protest the museum's censorship of the artwork, Ōura's supporters organized a group show of 25 Japanese artists entitled "Atomic Sunshine" Okinawa Show Censorship Protest Art Exhibition (「アトミックサンシャイン」沖縄展の検閲に抗議する美術展) at Gallery Maki in Tokyo and a series of gallery talks, performances and workshops was held each day during the exhibition period. Some on the organizing team had been involved previously in Ōura's Toyama Prefectural Museum court case in the 1990s.

==== Aichi Triennale 2019 ====
The censorship issue surrounding Ōura's work re-emerged in 2019 when a new film he produced, Holding Perspective II (2019), was included in the 2019 Aichi Triennale's "After 'Freedom of Expression?'" (in Japanese:『「表現の不自由展」その後」』) alongside a representation of a "comfort woman," which led to the rightwing threats and protests against the exhibition, which ultimately led to the closure of this exhibition-in-exhibition for the majority of the Triennale's duration. Although the 20-minute long documentary Holding Perspective II mainly traced the proceedings of the Toyama Prefectural Art Museum incident and censorship trial of 1986–2000, the artist was thrust into the spotlight for disrespecting the Japanese Emperor again, more than 30 years after the initial scandal in Toyama.

According to the Triennale's chief curator Iida Shihoko, although the international attention of the Aichi Triennale censorship scandal has singled out the sculpture Statue of Peace by South Korean artists Kim Seo Kyung and Kim Eun Sung, 50% of the aggressive backlash that led to the exhibit's closure was indeed centered on Ōura's Holding Perspective II. Iida stated that most of the people who were against the exhibition had not actually seen it, and instead fixated on a few scenes of the artist from the film that had gone viral on social media, in which he uses a hand torch to burn his own prints from Holding Perspective (1982–85) that depict the emperor.

== Films ==
Following the Toyama Prefectural Art Museum incident (1986–2000), Ōura turned primarily to filmmaking, primarily documenting topics that are considered taboo and unapproachable in Japan. While losing the court case prompted many people to dissuade him from investigating risky topics in his art, Ōura says that the censorship ordeal actually helped him to "clearly see the subject that [he] should engage with in this world as a creator."

=== Holding Perspective (1995) ===
Japanese title: 遠近を抱えて (Enkin o Kakaete). Ōura's first film. An 87-minute avant-garde video work that delved into Ōura's issues of censorship with his print series of the same name, considering how the taboo of emperorism has been consciously and subconsciously twisted in modern Japanese society.

=== Hariu Ichirō in the heart of Japan, a man who held the whole of Japan. (2001) ===
Japanese title: 日本心中 針生一郎・日本を丸ごと抱え込んでしまった男。(Nihon Shinjū, Hariu Ichirō: Nihon o Marugoto Kakaekonde shimatta Otoko.). A 90-min fantastical film exploring the correlation between self and otherness and ancient layers of Japan's history, by following the footsteps of art and literary critic Hariu Ichirō as he walks around Gwangju, South Korea, and speaking in his home in Japan. The film was invited to be exhibited at the 2001 Yamagata International Documentary Film Festival.

=== 9.11-8.15 Nippon Suicide Pact (2005) ===
Japanese title: 9.11-8.15 日本心中 (9.11-8.15 Nihon Shinjū). A 145-minute long avant-garde film that reconsiders modern Japan in relation to the 9/11 terrorist attacks in the U.S., introducing many historically important figures in East Asian modern history and liberation movements. The main characters include Hariu Ichirō, an art critic who was ardently critical of postwar Japanese culture, and Shigenobu Mei, the daughter of Japanese Red Army member Shigenobu Fusako and a Palestinian activist, and prominent Butoh performer Ohno Kazuo. The film features Shigenobu Mei visiting the home of South Korean poet Kim Chi-Ha, who was imprisoned in the 1970s for his opposition to the Park Chung Hee dictatorship. Ōura considers 9.11-8.15 Nippon Suicide Pact to be a sequel to his 2001 film, Hariu Ichirō in the heart of Japan, a man who held the whole of Japan. It was featured at the Montreal World Film Festival in 2006.

=== Emperor Game (2011) ===
Japanese title: 天皇ごっこ 見沢知廉・たった一人の革命 (Tennō-gokko, Misawa Chiren: Tatta Hitori no Kakumei). A 115-minute long social documentary that traces the life of Misawa Chiren, an activist and writer who was involved in leftwing politics and the Sanrizuka struggle against the construction of the Narita Airport before becoming involved in the new rightwing movement. The film explores the story behind Misawa writing Emperor Game (天皇ごっこ, Tennō Gokkō) while sentenced to 12 years in prison for being involved in a murder case and his suicide in 2005.

=== Yasukuni, Earth Spirit, Emperor (2014) ===
Japanese Title: 靖国・地霊・天皇 (Yasukuni, Chirei Tennō). 90-minute film with foundations in Japanese poet and novelist Orikuchi Shinobu's, The Book of the Dead (originally published in 1939). Through this film, Ōura ponders the issues of modern Japan and the emperor system by shooting a movie that shows the debate between the right and leftwing perspectives the contentious 'issue' of the Yasukuni Shrine, which enshrines more than 2 million war victims, including more than a thousand convicted war criminals.

=== Holding Perspective II (2019) ===
Japanese title: 遠近を抱えて part II (Enkin o Kakaete part II).A 20-minute long film that traces the process surrounding the Toyama Prefectural Art Museum incident and trial of 1986–2000, and includes a scene of the artist using a hand torch to burn prints of his original 14-piece lithographic print series, Holding Perspective, that depicted imagery of the Emperor. Ōura's film became the topic of a censorship scandal at the Aichi Triennale in 2019.

=== Woman Holding Perspective (2018) ===
Japanese title: 遠近を抱えた女 (Enkin o Kakaeta Onna). A 98-minute film that Ōura considers to be a self-portrait, depicting the life of Japanese stage actress Abe Ayumi. It explores the idea of radical freedom and includes activities that are considered taboo in Japan, such as bondage and full body tattoos. Woman Holding Perspective was selected as the opening film at the 40th Brussels Independent Film Festival. The film was made available for online purchase in April 2020 with half the proceeds going towards rescuing small theatres in crisis due to COVID-19.

== Activism ==
Since the Toyama Museum incident, Ōura and his supporters have been working to raise political awareness and activism as a warning against the revival of rightwing conservatism and nationalism in Japan. He has helped organize and attended meetings and symposia on the topic, as well as worked with his supporters to publish a variety of pamphlets, articles, books and films to raise awareness of issues of nationalism, chauvinism, historical revisionism, and censorship. Art historian Kajiya Kenji has written that Ōura's censorship trial and subsequent activism influenced a new generation of critical artists that rose to prominence in the 1990s.

When artist and activist Hong Song-dam's large mural Sewol Owol was censored at the 2014 Gwanju Biennale in South Korea, Ōura incorporated statements of protest into his exhibited artworks as a show of support. Ōura traveled to South Korea to support Hong, where he 'censored' all 14 panels of the exhibited Holding Perspective with comments in English, Japanese, and Korean that rejected censorship, and aided in carrying out protests on site, including burning large portions of his exhibited artworks and cancelling the screening of his new film Yasukuni, Earth Spirit, Emperor (2014) to demonstrate the impact of censorship.

== See also ==
- Arakawa Shusaku
- Kim Chi-Ha
- Hong Song-dam
- Shimada Yoshiko
- Yanagi Yukinori
- Man Ray
- Hannah Höch
