= Kim Yong-Bock =

South Korean theologian (1938–2022)

Kim Yong-Bock (Korean: 김용복; 1938 – 7 April 2022) was a South Korean Presbyterian and founding father of minjung theology.

== Biography ==
Born in Cholla province, his father died of tuberculosis when he was six years old. Along with his mother and younger sister, Kim lived with his uncle and aunt, the latter of whom was a Christian and introduced him to church. Although he considered studying theology at the Presbyterian Theological Seminary, he pursued a BA in philosophy at Yonsei University (1961). During this time, he participated in the April 19 Revolution and was imprisoned for forty days. After completing his military service, he went to Princeton Theological Seminary and completed an MDiv (1966) and a PhD (1969). His dissertation was entitled "Historical Transformation, People's Movement, and Christian Koinonia." He was ordained in the Presbyterian Church of Korea (TongHap).

Kim was involved in ecumenical work, serving as part of the Christian Conference of Asia's Commission on Theological Concern (1976–1981) and as vice-moderator of the World Council of Churches Commission for the Churches' Participation in Development (1983–1991). He also served as President of Hanil University (1992–1999).

He died on 7 April 2022, in Seoul due to colorectal cancer.

== Minjung theology ==
Kim was known as one of the founding fathers of minjung theology, a movement in the late-1970s that advocated the struggle for social justice. However, for Kim, the spirit of minjung theology can be traced to the Protestant translation of the Bible, which chose to use Hangul Korean characters that were accessible to Korean commoners, as opposed to the Hanja Chinese characters used by the Confucian ruling class. This enabled early Korean Protestants to be involved in political activism, such as the March 1st Movement, and gave precedence for the later development of minjung theology.

== Works ==
- Kim, Yong-Bock, ed. (1981). Minjung Theology: People as the Subjects of History. Commission on Theological Concerns-the Christian Conference of Asia.
- Kim, Yong-Bock (1992). Messiah and Minjung: Christ's Solidarity with the People for New Life. Christian Conference of Asia. Urban Rural Mission. ISBN 978-962-7250-10-4.
