= 386 Generation =

South Korean generation born in the 1960s

The 386 Generation (Korean: 386 세대; Hanja: 386 世代; RR: sampallyuk sedae) is the generation of South Koreans born in the 1960s who were very active politically as young adults, and instrumental in the democracy movement of the 1980s.

The Hankyoreh, a South Korean left-liberal newspaper, reported that right-wing conservatives in Japan perceive the 386 generation as being "anti-Japanese".

== Etymology ==
The term was coined in the early 1990s, in reference to what was then the latest computer model, Intel's 386, and referring to people then in their 30s, having attended university in the 1980s, and born in the 1960s.

== History ==
This was the first generation of South Koreans to grow up free from the poverty that had marked South Korea in the recent past. The broad political mood of the generation was far more left-leaning than that of their parents, or their eventual children. They played a pivotal role in the democratic protests which forced President Chun Doo-hwan to claim democratic elections in 1987, marking the transition from military dictatorship (Third and Fifth republic) to democracy.

Members of the 386 generation now comprise much of the elite of South Korean society. Kim Dae-jung benefitted from widespread 386er support, but it is the election of Roh Moo-hyun who was the strongest demonstration of the more left-leaning politics of the generation. Not all 386 generations are upper class or left-liberal, but some 386 generations are described as "liberal elite" or "progressive elite".

== See also ==
- Neoliberalism
- Gangnam leftist
- Democratic Party of Korea
- People Party (South Korea)
- Justice Party (South Korea)
- Angry young man (South Korea)
- June Struggle
- Undongkwon
