= Kim Kyoungin =

Kim Kyoungin Korean: 김경인 (born 1972) is a Korean poet. She is noted in the literary world for her provocative poems and known as a "poet who breaks mirrors." Kim published two poetry collections, Hanbamui qwil-teu (한밤의 퀼트 Quilt of Midnight) in 2007 and Yaedeura, modeun ireumeul saranghae (얘들아, 모든 이름을 사랑해 Everyone, Love All the Names) in 2012.

== Life ==
Kim was born in Seoul in 1972. Her grandfather is Kim Dong-in, a famous author known for "Gamja (감자, Potato)" and "Baettaragi (배따라기, Boat's Departure)." He had about thirty descendants, and Kyoungin is the only one who is pursuing her career in literature. As a child, she enjoyed reading and writing very much, so many told her to become a writer like her grandfather. During her middle school Korean class, she found and read "Bulgeun san (붉은 산, Red Mountains)", also written by her grandfather, in her textbook, and truly realized her grandfather's literary legacy for the first time. She mostly wrote in prose until high school, but started writing poems unlike her grandfather, after reading Kim Su-young's poems.

When Kim was attending Gye-seong Girls' High School, she belonged to a literature club and won the prose category of many writing contests. Later she entered Hanyang University Graduate School in 1994 to study Korean literature and get down to writing poetry. Her career as a poet began after the literary journal Munye Joongang published seven of her poems, including "Yeonghwaneun ohu dasutsiwa yeosutsi sa-i-e sangyeong doenda (영화는 오후 5시와 6시 사이에 상영된다, Film Plays Between Five and Six in the Afternoon)" in 2001. She published two poetry collections, Hanbamui qwil-teu in 2007 and Yaedeura, modeun ireumeul saranghae in 2012. She has been teaching writing in university since 2012.

== Writing ==
=== Style ===
Kim is noted in the literary world for her provocative and fascinating poems and known as a "poet who breaks mirrors." That being said, critics have pointed out that her poems do not try to criticize or judge, but offer a warm consolation. Rather than sending a direct message, they aim to show how weak and helpless people really are. Kim's poetry describes the indefinable essence of existence or frustrating relationships in which communication is impossible, but the poet said that "we can accept each other even when we don't understand each other."

=== Hanbamui Qwil-teu (2007) ===
In her first poetry collection, images related to water appear quite often—such as cloud, blood, and roots. These images remind the readers of 'deep water' and 'submergence', creating a dark and fearful mood. In addition, by juxtaposing the images of 'water' and that of 'desert', Kim embraces the past and present, reality and dream, consciousness and unconsciousness, and artificiality and nature.

"Amudo pi heuliji anneun jeonyuk (아무도 피 흘리지 않는 저녁, Evening Where No One Bleeds)", a poem with what is actually a paradoxical title, serenely depicts a forlorn capitalist society where the petit bourgeois live without true communication. It reveals the anxiety, loneliness, and alienation of modern men who are faced by crime and violence, and develops these personal feelings into the problems of the modern society as a whole.

=== Yaedeura, modeun ireumeul saranghae (2012) ===
The poet's second poetry collection goes further than her first one, which aims to break mirrors and the gaze of others, to talk about the chaos and fear caused by the broken mirrors. The broken mirrors represent a world without order where we are untethered from our fixed selves. The image of 'collapsing stairways' alludes that there is death under the stairways, and describes a fear of losing our identities. However, the death here is closely related to life, to matters at hand, such as redevelopment. In "Jaegaebal Guyeok (재개발구역, Redevelopment Area)", families and residents who have to move due to redevelopment are not to end up with despair, but to raise their voices and tell their own stories.

== Works ==
《한밤의 퀼트》, 랜덤하우스, 2007 / Hanbamui qwil-teu (Quilt of Midnight), RH Korea, 2007

《얘들아, 모든 이름을 사랑해》, 민음사, 2012 / Yaedeura, modeun ireumeul saranghae (Everyone, Love All the Names), Mineumsa, 2012

== Awards ==
Webzine Seeinkwangjang Award for New Poetry (웹진 시인광장 신작시 작품상, 2011), for her poem "Amudo pi heuliji anneun jeonyuk."
