= Kwang-seon =

- Hangul: 광선
- RR: Gwangseon
- MR: Kwangsŏn

Kwang-seon, also spelled Kwang-sun, is a Korean given name.

People with this name include:

- Kim Gwang-seon (born 1946), South Korean cyclist
- Kim Kwang-sun (born 1964), South Korean boxer
- Go Gwang-seon (born 1969), South Korean rower
- Song Gwang-seon (born 1970), South Korean swimmer
- Kwak Kwang-seon (born 1986), South Korean footballer
- Pyon Kwang-sun (born 1986), North Korean female artistic gymnast
- Lee Kwang-seon (born 1989), South Korean footballer
- David Kwang-sun Suh, 20th-century South Korean theologian

== See also ==
- List of Korean given names
