= Ahn Byung-Mu =

South Korean Christian theologian (1922–1996)

Ahn Byung-Mu (Korean: 안병무; June 23, 1922 – October 19, 1996) was a South Korean New Testament scholar and founding father of minjung theology.

== Biography ==
Ahn was born in South Pyongan Province as the first son of a traditional doctor. When he was one year old, his family fled Japanese-colonized Korea to Manchuria. He was introduced to Christianity in primary school and entered a secondary school run by the Canadian Presbyterian mission. He went to Japan in 1941 to study sociology and philosophy at Taisho University and Waseda University. Although this was interrupted, he continued his studies in sociology with a minor in religion at Seoul National University (1946–1950). He worked as a lecturer at Chungang Seminary, teaching sociology and ancient Greek, where he gained an interest in the works of Rudolf Bultmann. He then pursued a PhD (1956–1965) at Heidelberg University under the supervision Günther Bornkamm, a student of Bultmann, completing a dissertation on "Das Verständnis der Liebe bei K'ung-tse und bei Jesus" (Understanding Love in Confucius and Jesus).

Ahn returned to Korea in 1965 and taught at Chungang Seminary, Yonsei University, Hankuk Theological Seminary, and Hanshin University. Due to his involvement in democracy movements, he was dismissed from two of his positions and imprisoned in 1976.

== Minjung theology ==
A founding figure in minjung theology, Ahn was speaking as early as 1972 on the topic of "Jesus and the Minjung (Ochlos)." In this paper, Ahn argued that the suffering of the minjung was not individual, but collective suffering. Ahn argued that, in the Gospel of Mark, Jesus was always on the side of the ochlos, the "crowd" who were marginalized and dehumanized. Ahn believed that German historical-critical exegesis neglected the place of the ochlos, and yet Jesus's ministry was focused on creating the Kingdom of God with this marginalized crowd.

== Works ==
- Ahn, Byung-Mu (2019). Stories of Minjung Theology: The Theological Journey of Ahn Byung-Mu in His Own Words (PDF). SBL Press. ISBN 978-1-62837-257-1.
- Ahn, Byung-Mu (2013). Kim, Yung Suk; Kim, Jin-Ho (eds.). Reading Minjung Theology in the Twenty-First Century: Selected Writings by Ahn Byung-Mu and Modern Critical Responses. Wipf and Stock Publishers. ISBN 978-1-62189-876-4.
- Ahn, Byung-Mu (1986). Draussen vor dem Tor: Kirche und Minjung in Korea : theologische Beiträge und Reflexionen (in German). Vandenhoeck & Ruprecht. ISBN 978-3-525-56324-3.
- Ahn, Byung-Mu (1965). Das Verständnis der Liebe bei K'ung-tse und bei Jesus (in German). Verlag nicht ermittelbar.
