= Kim Choon-mie =

South Korean Japanologist (born 1943)

- Born: 1943 (age 82–83); Seoul, Korea, Empire of Japan
- Education: Korea University
- Occupation: Japanologist

Korean name
- Hangul: 김춘미
- Hanja: 金春美
- RR: Gim Chunmi
- MR: Kim Ch'unmi

Kim Choon-mie (born 1943) is a South Korean academic and Japanologist, honored by the government of Japan for having "[c]ontributed to the introduction of Japanese literature and the promotion of Japanese language education."

== Education ==
Kim graduated and received Ph.D in Cultural Studies and Comparative Literature from Korea University in Seoul in 1984.

== Career ==
- 1984 – Professor of Japanese Literature, Korea University.
- 2005 – President of the Research Center of Japanese Studies, Korea University.

Kim is a former president of the Korean Institution of Japanology.

She is a translator of Haruki Murakami's Kafka on the Shore. According to her, Murakami opened doors for Japanese literature in postwar South Korea, especially with the 386 Generation who were born in the 1960s.

== Honors ==
- Order of the Rising Sun, Gold Rays with Neck Ribbon, 2009.

== Selected works ==
- 1993 – 日本近代知識人の思想と実践 : 有島武郎の場合 (Nihon kindai chishikijin no shisō to jissen: Arishima Takeo no baai or The Thought and Practice of Modern Japanese Intellectuals : the Case of Arishima Takeo). Kyoto: Kokusai Nihon Bunka Kenkyū Sentā. OCLC 190622114
- 2008 -- "Korea’s '386 Generation' that Identifies with a Sense of Loss: The Haruki Boom in Korea," in Wild Haruki Chase: Reading Murakami Around the World, Kokusai Kōryū Kikin., editor. Berkeley: Stone Bridge Press. ISBN 978-1-933-33066-2; OCLC 196315807
