= O Yoon =

South Korean painter (1946–1986)

Oh Yoon
- Born: April 13, 1946
- Died: July 5, 1986 (aged 40)
- Occupations: Painter, Printmaker
- Writing career
- Period: 1970–1986

Korean name
- Hangul: 오윤
- RR: O Yun
- MR: O Yun

Oh Yoon (Korean: 오윤, April 13, 1946 – July 5, 1986) was a South Korean painter whose pieces focused on peoples' art. It was set during the 1980s when military officials seized power and repressed opposition, notably in the Gwangju massacre in 1980. Hence, his artworks largely expressed interests in the joys and sorrows of citizens during the 1970s and 1990s.

== Biography ==
Born in 1946, Yoon went to Department of Arts, majoring in sculpture at Seoul National University. His father, Oh Young-su, was a novelist. It is said that Yoon was greatly influenced by his grandfather and uncle, the great master of Dongrae crane dance. Dongrae crane dance is one of the most famed Korean traditional dances which describes the movement of cranes originated from Dongrae, current Busan.

Yoon was the first member of the artists movement "Reality and Speech" (현실과 발언), a grouping of young writers and artists, the group of which intended to express the suppression of Korean society. His pieces focused on social function of art, researching on the traditional Korean arts such as Minhwa, what-so-called shamanic paintings, Talchum and Gut, traditional form of exorcism.

His works are considered to reflect a Korean conception of grief called han. Through this way, he expressed Han based on lives of commoners in woodprints. Though his major was firstly sculptor, his woodprints have been appreciated to deal with shapes of people.

His works failed to gain enough attention before his death, which was later revalued as the icon of people's arts in the 1980s since the decade referred to the transition to the democracy in South Korea.

He died of Cirrhosis at the age of 40 after his first exhibition in Seoul.

In 2010, complete collection of O yoon was published by collaborative works and well-known poet Kim Chi-Ha also joined the project.

== Works ==
Although he was a famed printmaker, his career actually started from a sculptor, while he didn't limit his ambition concentrating not only on printworks but also on modernized masks or illustrations.

Rhythmical movement of dancers were expressed under the concept of Buddhist painting, collage and mosaics to connect Korean arts further with Pop art and modernism. The works even extended to deal with Korean traditional ceremony of gut or exorcism.

One of the key images Mr.O would like to describe is Korean traditional exorcism, gut. The most popular image of gut is sword dance, which led his works to convey the motion of the traditional exorcism ceremony.

The titles of his works showed his style who paid attention to the lives of common people: e.g. ⟨Dawn of Labour⟩(노동의 새벽), ⟨The land⟩(대지), ⟨The song of sword⟩(칼노래) and ⟨The lemures⟩(원귀도). Though he failed to attain magnificent attention, his works have gained much larger attention since 2000s.

20th anniversary of his death were celebrated in major museums such as National Museum of Contemporary Art and Ghana Art center.

== See also ==
- Oh Young-su: O Yoon's father and famed novelist
- Kim Chi-ha: A South Korean poet
- People's Revolutionary Party Incident
