= Apo-eup =

Place in South Korea

Coordinates: 36°09′45″N 128°15′08″E

- Hangul: 아포읍
- Hanja: 牙浦邑
- RR: Apo-eup
- MR: Ap'o-ŭp

Apo-eup is an eup in Gimcheon, Gyeongsangbuk-do, central South Korea. It has an area of 53.48 km^{2}. Although it contains several low peaks, the land of Apo-eup also contains a great deal of flat and fertile floodplain; local agriculture is dominated by rice cultivation. The small Gamcheon river runs along the eastern border. As of January 2005, the population is 8,799, and has fallen somewhat since 1995. It is divided among 30 ri.

The region first enters historical records in the Proto–Three Kingdoms period, when it successfully rebelled against the local polity of Gammun-guk. It appears as part of Unified Silla in 757, when it made up two myeon in Gaeryeong-hyeon: Dong-myeon and Apo-myeon. This situation continued for more than a thousand years, until the massive reorganization of Korea's local governments in 1914, at which time the two myeon were united into the present-day entity of Apo-eup. Apo-eup was originally part of Gimcheon County; when the county was split into Gimcheon City and Geumneung County in 1949, it became part of Geumneung County. With the reunification of city and county in 1995, Apo-eup became part of Gimcheon once more.

Apo-eup is located near the heart of the national transportation grid. The junction of the Gyeongbu Expressway and Jungbu Naeryuk Expressways is located in Apo-eup. The Gyeongbu Line railroad also passes through the eup. Although there are two stations along the railroad, Apo Station and Daesin Station, they are not served by regular trains.

Local attractions include the ancient tombs of Bongsan-ri, which are located in the floodplain of the Gamcheon.

== See also ==
- Geography of South Korea
