= Hwanggeum-dong, Gimcheon =

Hwanggeum-dong
- Country: South Korea

Korean name
- Hangul: 황금동
- Hanja: 黃金洞
- RR: Hwanggeum-dong
- MR: Hwanggŭm-dong

Hwanggeum-dong (Korean: 황금동) is a ward of Gimcheon, North Gyeongsang Province, South Korea.
