= David Kwang-sun Suh =

Ordained minister of the Presbyterian Church of Korea

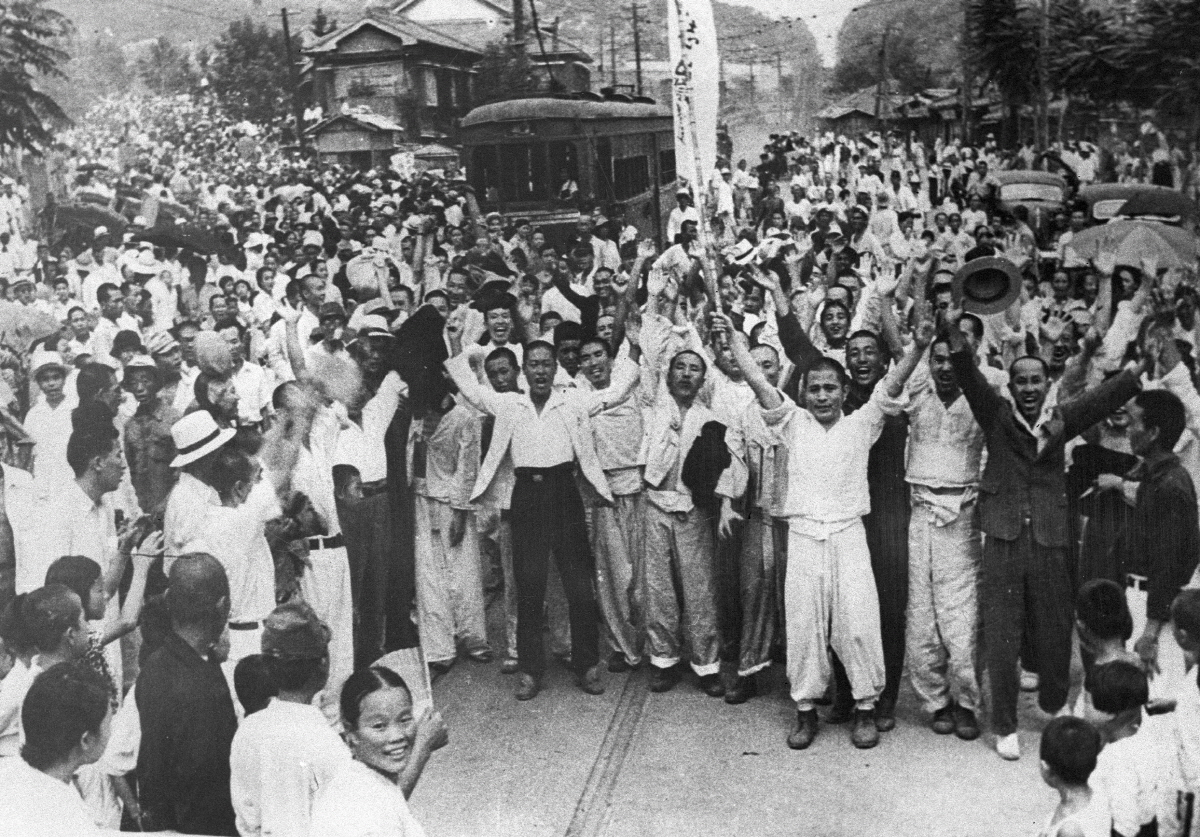
Liberation of Korea

David Kwang-sun Suh an ordained minister of the Presbyterian Church of Korea and was the dean of the College of Liberal Arts and Sciences at Ewha Womans University of Seoul, Korea until he was arrested in 1980. He is perhaps best known as a major representative of the first generation of Korean minjung theologians. He was the President of the World Alliance of YMCAs from 1994 to 1998.

== Minjung Theology ==
Suh traces the origins of minjung theology to the March First Movement of 1919, an independence movement triggered by the end of World War I and the death of King Kojong, the last king of the Yi Dynasty. It was during the 1919 independence movement when Korean minjung and Korean Christians partnered together to rise against foreign domination and liberate themselves from Japanese rule, thereby giving birth to minjung theology.

While Suh sees minjung theology as being borne from a political movement, he also clarifies that it has risen from the indigenous Korean shamanism as a religion of the poor, oppressed, and marginalized. Combined with the spiritual mindset of Korean shamanism, Suh writes that "For the powerless minjung, the power of the spirit, more particularly the power of the Holy Ghost, is most respected and awed. To become a Christian is to believe in the power of the Holy Ghost which is much more powerful than their shaman spirits." The spirituality of the minjung, then, is a spirituality that has emerged from the feelings of han—the deep feeling of suffering and helplessness experienced by the oppressed.

== Writings ==
- Suh, David Kwang-sun (2000). "Minjung Theology," in Dictionary of Third World Theologies, ed. Virginia Fabella and R.S. Sugirtharajah. Maryknoll, NY: Orbis Books. ISBN 9781570752346
- Suh, David Kwang-sun (1981). "A Biographical Sketch of an Asian Theological Consultation," in Minjung Theology: People as the Subjects of History, edited by Yongbock Kim. Singapore: Zed Books. ISBN 9789971948054.
