= Elisabeth Shepping =

Elisabeth Johanna Shepping (September 26, 1880 – June 23, 1934) was a German-born American nurse and missionary who served in South Korea for 22 years. Shepping was born in a Roman Catholic family but later converted to Protestantism after emigrating to America and becoming a nurse. Shepping was named one of the "Top 7 Greatest Missionary" by the Department of Foreign Missions of the Southern Presbyterian Church and described by the former Minister of Health and Welfare as the "Pioneer of [the] Korean feminist movement". Shepping founder the Neel Bible School which became the Hanil University and Presbyterian Theological Seminary. She also founded the E-il school for women.

Shepping made a significant, diverse impact on the Korean communities she served, ranging from establishing and teaching schools, building churches, working as a nurse, translating nursing textbooks and publishing her own works, and rescuing hundreds of girls from prostitution. While some missionaries lived lavish lives separate from the underserved communities, Shepping did the opposite. She actively sought to become a member of the Korean communities she served. She did so by communicating with others only in Korean, living with poor widows while raising orphans, and changing her name to Korean: Seo Seo-pyeong.

== Early life ==
Elisabeth Shepping was born into a Roman Catholic family in Germany on September 26, 1880. When she was a year old, her father was killed and her mother emigrated to the U.S., leaving Shepping with her grandmother to raise her. Her grandmother died when Shepping was nine years old, so Shepping emigrated alone to New York to meet her mother and finish schooling. At nineteen years old, Shepping obtained her U.S. citizenship and at twenty-one years old, she became an official nurse. While working as a head nurse on night shift at New York Jewish Hospital, Shepping took religious-related coursework during the day at the Biblical Teacher Training School (currently known as the New York Theology School). Shepping met Wilbert Webster White, the founder and former president of this school. White taught Shepping how to interpret the Bible, and she carried this knowledge into her missionary work. This led her to explore nursing studies, theology studies, and education studies, which inspired her to become a missionary. Shepping decided to dedicate her life to a life of self-sacrifice. She was exposed to many different movements throughout her life, such as the Student Volunteer Movement, the social gospel movement, and ecumenism which promoted worldwide Christian unity. Shepping was also introduced to Protestantism by one of her nurse colleagues. She eventually converted from Roman Catholic to Protestant, which led her mother to disown her.

== Mission ==
=== Calling ===
As a nurse, Shepping combined her knowledge in nursing, theology, and education as a missionary who sought to treat the poor and neglected. During seminary, she heard that there was an urgent need for nurses in Korean hospitals. This eventually led to her decision to join a Southern Presbyterian Church mission trip to Joseon when she was 32 years old. During this time, Korea was unstable because the Empire of Japan had taken over Korea two years earlier in 1910. The government and most of society left the weak even more neglected. As a result, an increased number of beggars, lepers, and sick patients died of hunger and disease. Shepping wanted to help improve their lives. In 1912 at 32 years old, after traveling with the mission trip, Shepping dedicated the rest of her life to service there.

=== Nursing ===
From 1912-1934, Shepping worked in many provinces in Korea ranging from Gwanju, Gunsan, Busan, and Seoul. In particular, Shepping made an effort to help the poor and neglected: "women, widows, orphans, lepers, etc." Shepping placed most priority on her nursing work. After arriving in Korea, she worked in Jejungwon, Guam Jesus Hospital, Severance Hospital, and other hospitals in Korea. As a nurse, she was also in charge of training and supervising the nurses. Shepping published and translated many nursing textbooks to promote health and education while in Korea. Some of the nursing textbooks that she wrote are translated to Nursing Textbook, Practice Nursing Studies, Nursing Guideline, Simple Hygiene Law She is known as the founder of the Chosun Nurses Association in 1923 which became the Korean Nurses Association. She served as president for 10 years and successfully applied for KNA to become part of the International Council of Nurses.

=== Education ===
On top of nursing, Shepping highly valued education, so she established schools in South Korea. For instance, Shepping established the first women bible school in Korea (the Neel Bible School) which at one point educated 30,000-40,000 women every year. This school became later known as Hanil University and Presbyterian Theological Seminary, which still runs today. From its establishment to her death, Shepping personally taught 5–6 subjects at this school. Some of the topics that she covered related to reading, writing, hymnody, and biblical education as well as medicine and nursing to prevent disease from spreading throughout the community. While promoting education, Shepping's main commitment was towards educating women in Christianity to become effective Bible women. Additionally, Shepping established a lady's school called E-il, where women were taught how to support themselves and make a living. Shepping made sure that the school was self-sustaining by raising silkworms and educating the women on how to sew. During the day, Shepping was a teacher but at night, she held evangelistic events and trained women to become evangelists. Since Korean women were usually addressed based on their family members or village, Shepping gave them Christian names. By doing so, the women more strongly identified as Christian and empowered them to spread the Bible.

=== Cultural assimilation ===
Unlike many other missionaries, Shepping actively tried to assimilate to Korean culture and identified herself with the Korean people. Shepping did not consider herself superior to the communities she served, and this is evidenced by the way she lived her day-to-day life. She dressed in traditional Korean clothes, ate Korean food, spoke Korean fluently, and followed Korean customs, cultures, and beliefs. There were people who called Shepping "a foreigner who is more Korean than Koreans". Shepping had a very modest life in Korea; she lived with 34 poor widows, adopted 13 daughters, only ate soybean soup & barley food, and lived in a mud house with a tin plate roof. This is contrary to missionaries who lived lavishly in mansions separate from the communities they served. Additionally, Shepping changed her name to Seo Seo-Pyoung and communicated with others only in Korean even when the Japanese established a policy to prohibit speaking Korean. Shepping served in Korea for 22 years until her death, and she died from malnutrition. Her last words were to use her body for dissection at the Severance Hospital.

== Legacy ==
Shepping was appointed as the "Top 7 Greatest Missionary" by the Department of Foreign Missions of the Southern Presbyterian Church. She was known for spearheading a crusade against smoking, alcohol, and prostitution in Gwangju. Additionally, Shepping made a significant impact on the women who attended the schools she established such as the Neel School (previously mentioned). During this time, a majority of Korean women were illiterate and were unaware of how the economy functioned. Women's education was restricted, and Shepping wanted to bridge this gap by providing Korean women with the opportunity to learn and grow. The Neel School became known for its role in women's education in its province. Many of the women who graduated from here were a part of the vanguard of enlightenment movement and new women's movement. Shepping was considered a selfless pioneer of women's enlightenment by promoting women's education and literacy. Kim Moim, a former Minister of Health and Welfare, stated that Shepping was a, "Pioneer of Korean feminist movement and a true descendant of Nightingale, the disciple of love". In 2017, a Christian documentary depicting her life of service was released, entitled 서서평, 천천히 평온하게 (Seo-Seo Pyeong, Slowly and Peacefully).
