= Grace Jung =

Korean-American comedian, actor, writer and filmmaker

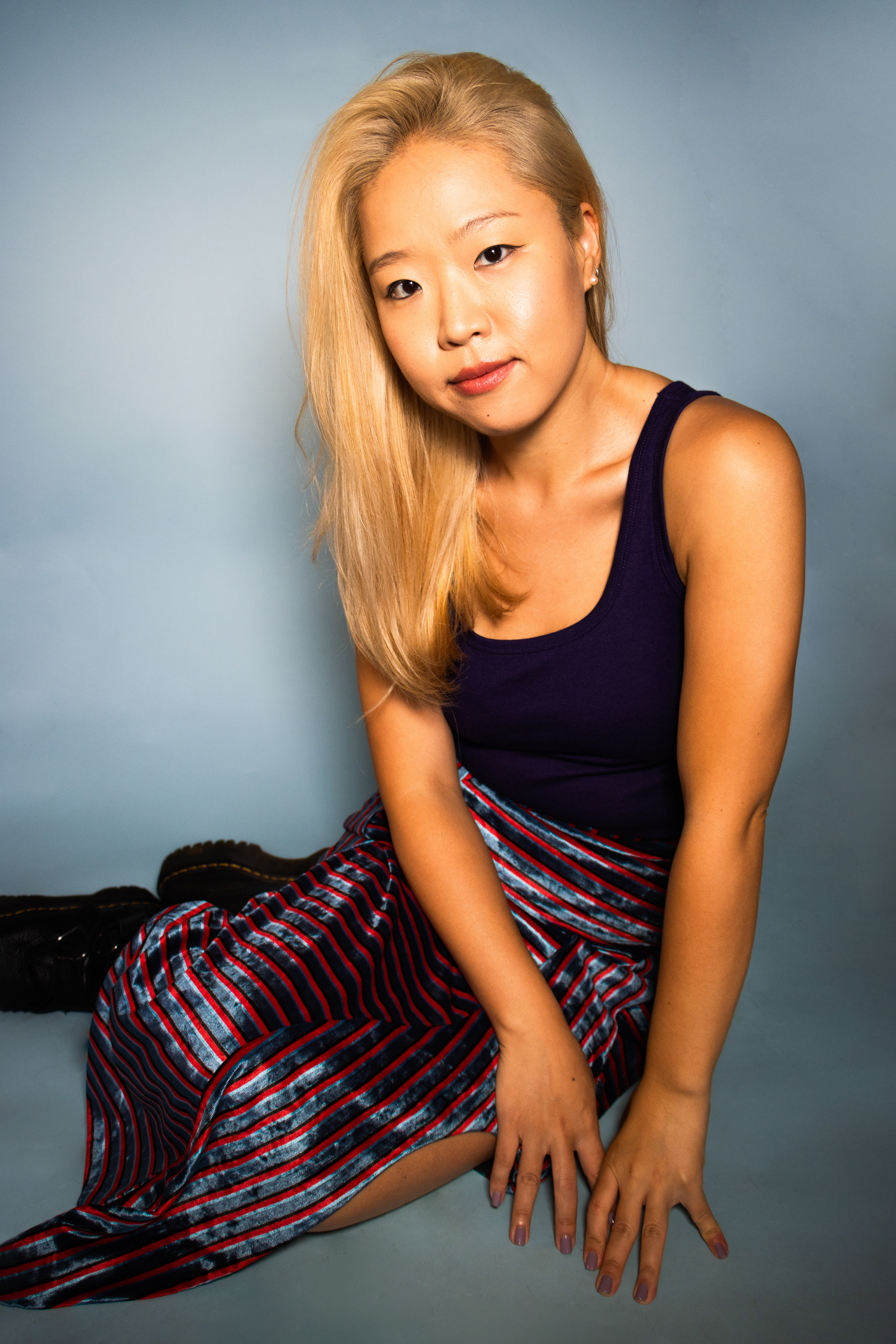
2023

Grace Jung (정현주) is a Korean American stand-up comedian, actor, writer, scholar and filmmaker. She is the author of the non-fiction book K-Drama School: A Pop Culture Inquiry into Why We Love Korean Television published by Running Press and Hachette Book Group. The book is an extension of her podcast K-Drama School.

She is also the author of the novel Deli Ideology, about a college graduate working in a delicatessen during the recession. Jung translated literature by Korean authors Yi Chong-jun, Yi Sang and Kim Tong-in.

== Biography ==
Jung was born in Busan, South Korea, and immigrated to Brooklyn, New York in 1992. She earned her B.A. in English Literature at Pace University. She has a PhD in Cinema and Media Studies from UCLA. She is a former Fulbright Scholar.

=== Awards ===
- Academy of American Poets Prize
- Fulbright Research Scholarship
