= Sasanggye =

South Korean literary magazine (1953–1970)

- Categories: Literary magazine
- Frequency: Monthly
- Founded: 1953
- Final issue: 1970
- Country: South Korea
- Based in: Seoul
- Language: Korean

Sasanggye (Korean: 사상계; lit. 'World of Thought') was a monthly South Korean leftist literary magazine which was in circulation between 1953 and 1970. It was subject to censorship several times during its run. It has been described as "the most widely circulated and discussed intellectual magazine in Korea at the time."

== History and profile ==
Sasanggye was started in 1953. The magazine came out monthly, and its headquarters was in Seoul. The first issue of the magazine had a circulation of 3,000 copies. Following the Korean War The Asia Foundation which was established in San Francisco, USA, in 1951 supported several South Korean publications and cultural projects, including Sasanggye.

Sasanggye featured literary work by leading Korean writers. The monthly also covered political content one of which was the detailed analysis of the Political Parties Act in the 1960s. It initiated a prize for Kim Dong-in, Korean writer, in 1955 four years after his death. Kim Seungok published two short stories in the magazine. Kim Chi-ha's poem Five Thieves was published in the magazine in 1970 which led to its confiscation. Shortly after this incident Sasanggye folded in 1970.
