= Gimcheon =

City in North Gyeongsang, South Korea

Coordinates: 36°08′N 128°06′E

- Municipal City
- Panoramic view of Gimcheon

- Flag Emblem of Gimcheon

- Location in South Korea
- Country: South Korea
- Region: Yeongnam
- Administrative divisions: 1 eup, 14 myeon, 7 dong

Area
  - Total: 1,009.5 km^{2} (389.8 sq mi)

Population (July 2025)
  - Total: 134,669
  - Density: 150/km^{2} (390/sq mi)
  - Dialect: Gyeongsang
- Time zone: UTC+9 (Korea Standard Time)
- Area code: +82-54
- Website: Official website (English)

Korean name
- Hangul: 김천시
- Hanja: 金泉市
- RR: Gimcheon-si
- MR: Kimch'ŏn-si

Gimcheon (Korean: 김천; lit. 'gold spring'; Korean pronunciation: [kim.tɕʰʌn]) is a city in North Gyeongsang Province, South Korea. It is situated on the major land transportation routes between Seoul and Busan, namely the Gyeongbu Expressway and Gyeongbu Line railway.

In ancient times, Gimcheon was famous for its three mountains (Geumo, Daedeok, Hwangak) and two rivers (Gamcheon, Jikjicheon). During the Chosun Dynasty, Gimcheon had one of the five largest markets in the region. The town has also served as the gateway and traffic hub of the Yeongnam region and is particularly proud of its patriots, history and conservative lifestyle.

The slogan of Gimcheon is 'Central Gimcheon', a recognition of the fact that it is situated almost at the center of South Korea.

== History ==
- Samhan Period : called Gammun-guk, Jujoma-guk
- Three kingdoms : Silla united Gammun-guk and Jujoma-guk and established Gammunju
- Unified Silla : Gammunju was renamed as Gaeryeonggun. Gimsanhyeon, Jiryehyeon, Eomohyeon and Mupunghyeon were placed.
- Goryeo period : Gaeryeonggun was changed into Gaeryeonghyeon. Gimsanhyeon and Jiryehyeon were included into Gyeongsanbu.
- Joseon period : It was located in Gimsan-gun, Jirye-hyeon, and Gaeryeong-hyeon, Gyeongsang-do. With the opening of the Gyeongbu Railway in 1905, it was developed as a collection area for agricultural products and other products.
- 1914 Gimsan, Jirye (except Gilbangri Jeungsanmyeon), Gaeryeonggun and Singokmyeon of Seongju were united into Gimcheongun(20myeons).
- 1917 : Gimcheonmyeon was promoted to Gimcheon special myeon.
- 1931 : Gimcheon special myeon was promoted to Gimcheoneup ( 1eup, 15 myeons).
- 1949 : Gimcheoneup was promoted to Gimcheon city, Gimcheongun wa renamed geumneunggun.
- 1983 : 4 ris of Geumneunggun were included into Gimcheon city. 2 ris of geumneunggun were included into Seonsangun.
- 1998 : arrangement of 13-dongs in Gimcheon city into 9-dongs (1-eup, 14-myeons, 9-dongs), arrangement of 9-dongs in Gimcheon city into 8-dongs (1-eup, 14-myeons, 8-dongs).

== Culture and sightseeing ==
=== Sights ===
Gimcheon's claim to fame is the temple Jikjisa (직지사), located at the foot of the mountain Hwangaksan. The temple was constructed in 418 (the 2nd year of King Nulji's reign, Silla Dynasty). Jikjisa is an important head temple of the Jogye Order of Korean Buddhism. This temple is in perfect harmony with the nearby valley and pine forest. The foliage in fall is particularly breathtaking. It features Birojeon Hall (also known as 'Cheonbuljeon Hall'), in which approximately 1,000 Buddha statues are enshrined, along with a thousand year old arrowroot. Iljumun Gate, Daeungjeon Hall (one of the most famous architectural structures of the Joseon Dynasty) and a 1.63m-tall Seated Stone Buddhist Statue (Treasures No. 319) from the Unified Silla Period, can also be found on the temple grounds.

Jikjisa is believed to have been first constructed by the Goguryeo monk Ado in the year 418, long before Buddhism gained general acceptance in Silla. Jikjisa was largely destroyed during the Seven Year War in the 1590s. The reconstruction of the temple spanned from 1610 to about 1670.

Jikjisa is possibly one of the oldest temples in South Korea and it is relatively well-connected to a convenient train and bus service. Jikjisa Station is located at the foot of the mountain, along the Gyeongbu Line railroad. It is served only by local commuter trains, which run twice daily in each direction. Overnight or weekend temple stay programs are available at the main complex.

Temple admission fees: Adults: 2,500 won Youth: 1,500 won Children: 1,000 won ＊Free: ages under 6 and over 65

Directions to Jikjisa: - Dong Seoul Terminal to Gimcheon (Departure 3 times a day (10:10, 14:10, 18:10), 3 hour ride). - Get on the bus (No. 11, No. 111) to Jikjisa Temple at Gimcheon Station or Gimcheon Bus Terminal(25 minute ride).

=== Hiking & mountains ===
Mt. Hwangaksan (1,111m in elevation), home of Jikjisa, is located in the Sobaeksan Mountains. The area is a habitat for many cranes that reside on this mountain. This location is also known for its pine forests, streams, fall foliage and snowscapes.

Other natural and outdoor cultural properties:

- Sudo Valley
- Yongo Waterfall
- Yetnalsomssimaeul Culture Village
- Sculpture Park
- Riverside Park
- Yeonhwaji Pond

=== Festivals ===
- Grape Sale Promotional Event

Various events including a beauty pageant, a grape fair, sales and food fair introducing various grape foods are offered every July in the downtown area.

- Half-Marathon Race

An annual sporting event held at the Sport City every May. Traditional military band performances and ballroom dancing are also offered, in addition to various food events.

- Family Drama Festival

An annual festival at the Gimcheon Art Hall every October emphasizing the importance of family through plays and dramatic performances.

=== Museums ===
- Bitnae Nong-ak Training Center
- World Ceramic Museum

=== Temples and cultural sites ===
- Cheongamsa Temple
- Sudoam Temple
- Gyerimsa Temple
- Gaenyeong Hyangyo Confucian School
- Jirye Hanggyo Confucian School
- Hahoe House of the Seongsan Yeo Family
- Seated Buddha Statue, Gahangsa Temple
- Bangchojeong Pavilion
- The Church of Jesus Christ of Latter-Day Saints
- The House and Residence of Local Man Jang-Yeoul Lee

=== Other places of interest ===
- Baegsu Literature Hall
- Culture & Art Hall
- Gimcheon Municipal Library
- Citizen's Bell
- Obong Reservoir
- Sports City
- Gimcheon University

== Cuisine ==
=== Traditional food ===
Traditional restaurants can be found in almost all of Gimcheon's districts but the largest concentration of such establishments is located at the base of Jikjisa Temple, in the Jikji Culture Park. The Culture Park features an ample selection of both local and traditional specialities.

== Transportation ==
=== Road ===
Gimcheon is located along the Gyeongbu Expressway and many major roadways connect the city to other surrounding areas.

=== Rail ===
Main transportation connections are via the Gyeongbu Line and the Gyeongbuk Line train lines. In 2010, a newly constructed KTX station, Gimcheon-Gumi Station opened on the outskirts of the city center The district around this new KTX station is slowly expanding, however, currently it is only accessible by vehicle, local bus or taxi. From the KTX station to Gimcheon Train Station (the main downtown shopping center) via taxi, it is roughly a 15,000 to 20,000₩ expense.

== Community and expat information ==
In 2004, it was reported that the population was 144,587, including 143,527 Koreans and 1,060 non-Koreans.

While Gimcheon is much smaller compared to its nearby counterparts, there is a sizeable expat community scattered amongst the seven district neighborhoods. As of 2013, there are an estimated 40 to 60 expats residing within the city limits, most employed as English teachers through the government run EPIK (English Program in Korea) and TaLK programs.

=== Local specialties ===
- Grapes - Gimcheon is responsible for 11% of total grape production in Korea.
- Plums - 29% of the total plum production in Korea stems from Gimcheon. They are high in vitamin A and known for aiding with fatigue.
- Gwahaju - Literally named "post-summer wine", this local drink is made from glutinous rice and yeast. Fresh water for production is sourced from Gimcheon's Gwahacheon Stream.
- Jirye Wild Boar Meat - Said to be especially beneficial for young children due to a high concentration of protein, healthy fats and DHA.
- Brassware and gong production.
- Joma Potatoes

== Administrative districts ==
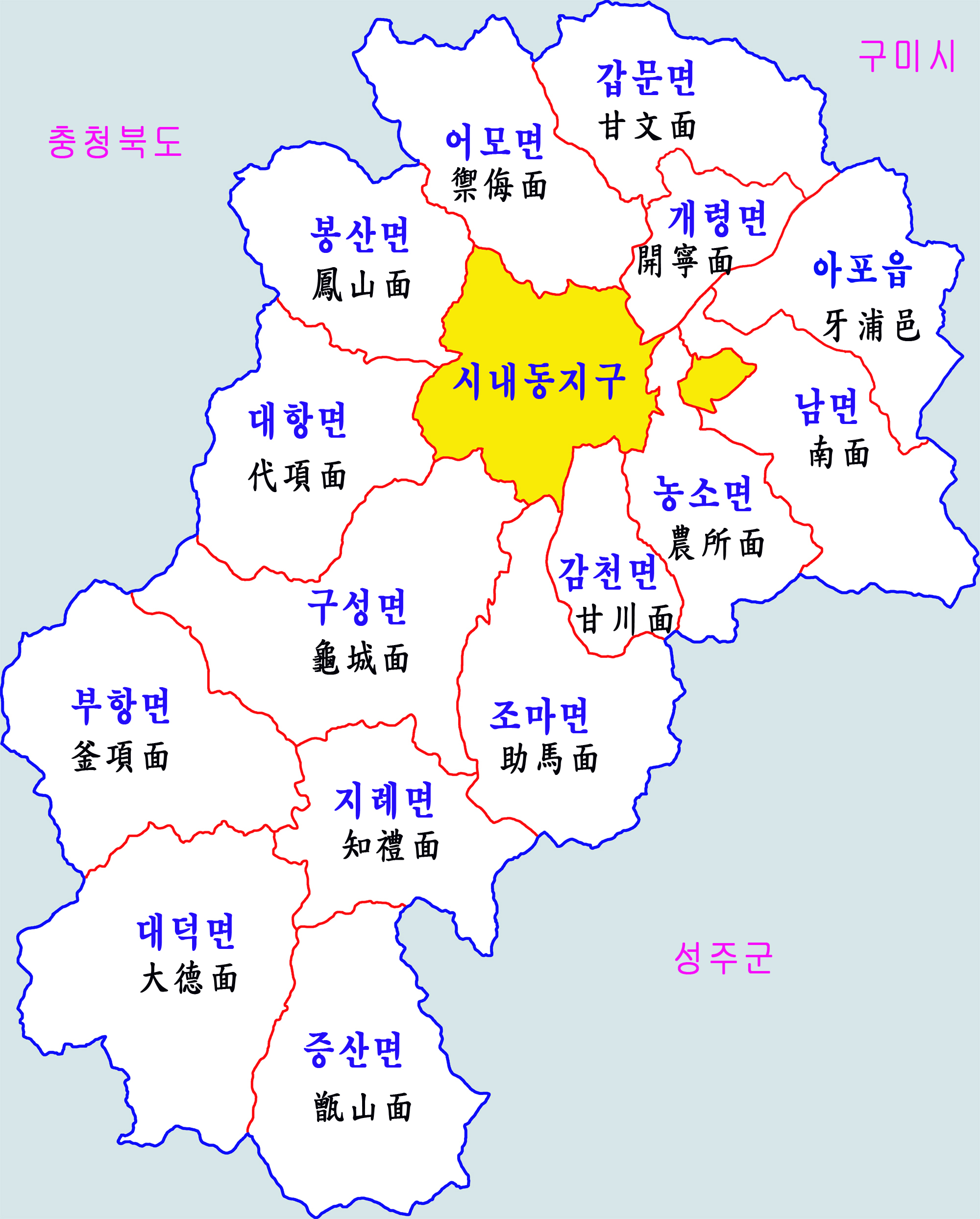
Map of Gimcheon in Korean

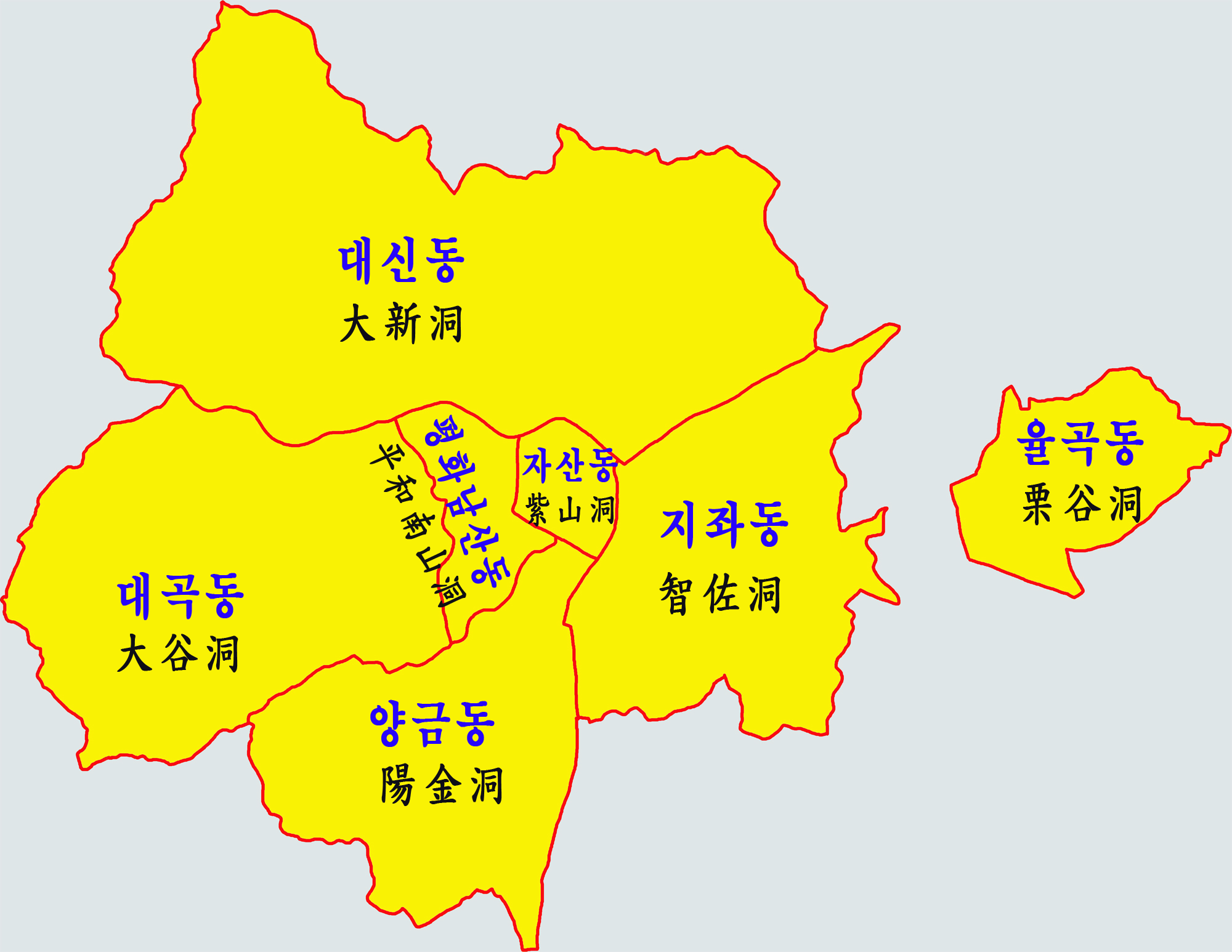
Inset map of Gimcheon

The outlying regions of Gimcheon are divided into fourteen myeon (or townships) and one eup (or large village). In addition, the city center is divided into seven dong, or precincts.

Name	Hangeul	Hanja
Apo-eup	아포읍	牙浦邑
Nongso-myeon	농소면	農所面
Nam-myeon	남면	南面
Gaeryeong-myeon	개령면	開寧面
Gammun-myeon	감문면	甘文面
Eomo-myeon	어모면	禦侮面
Bongsan-myeon	봉산면	鳳山面
Daehang-myeon	대항면	代項面
Gamcheon-myeon	감천면	甘川面
Joma-myeon	조마면	助馬面
Guseong-myeon	구성면	龜城面
Jirye-myeon	지례면	知禮面
Buhang-myeon	부항면	釜項面
Daedeok-myeon	대덕면	大德面
Jeungsan-myeon	증산면	甑山面
Jasan-dong	자산동	紫山洞
Pyeonghwa Namsan-dong	평화남산동	平和南山洞
Yanggeum-dong	양금동	陽金洞
Daesin-dong	대신동	大新洞
Daegeok-dong	대곡동	大谷洞
Jijwa-dong	지좌동	智佐洞
Yulgok-dong	율곡동	栗谷洞

== Notable people ==
- Shin Hyun-joon, first commandant of the South Korean marine corps
- Song Yoon-ah, South Korean actress
- Kang Hae-rin, member of South Korean girl-group NewJeans
- Shin Hak-chul, artist
- Baek Ha-na, women's doubles badminton player

== Sister cities ==
- Chengdu, Sichuan, China
- Nanao, Ishikawa, Japan

== See also ==
- Hwanggeum-dong, Gimcheon
- List of cities in South Korea
