= Park Soon-kyung =

South Korean Methodist theologian (1923–2020)

- 박순경
- Born: Park Soon-kyung; 1923; Yeoju, Gyeonggi Province, South Korea
- Died: 24 October 2020 (aged 96–97)
- Education: Methodist Theological University; Seoul National University; Emory University; Drew University
- Occupations: theologian; professor
- Theological work
- Language: Korean, English

Park Soon-kyung (Korean: 박순경; Hanja: 朴淳敬; 1923 – 24 October 2020) was a South Korean Methodist theologian.

== Biography ==
Born in Yeoju of Gyeonggi Province, Park first studied nursing before pursuing degrees in theology at Methodist Theological University in Seoul and philosophy at Seoul National University. She went for further studies in the United States, pursuing an M.Div. at Emory University and a Ph.D. at Drew University, completing a dissertation in 1966 on "Man in Karl Barth's doctrine of election."

Park returned to South Korea and was a professor of theology for 22 years at Ewha Woman's University (1966–1988), where she continued to hold a post as a professor emerita. She is known for her work towards a theology for the unification of North and South Korea, drawing from and critiquing minjung theology, and for the promotion of South Korean feminist theology.
