= Minjung theology =

South Korean Christian theological approach for social justice

- Hangul: 민중신학
- Hanja: 民衆神學
- Lit.: the people's theology
- RR: minjung sinhak
- MR: minjung sinhak

Minjung theology (Korean: 민중신학; lit. 'the people's theology') emerged in the 1970s from the experience of South Korean Christians in the struggle for social justice. It is a people's theology, and, according to its authors, "a development of the political hermeneutics of the Gospel in terms of the Korean reality." It is part of a wider Asian theological ferment, but it was not designed for export. It "is firmly rooted in a particular situation, and growing out of the struggles of Christians who embrace their own history as well as the universal message of the Bible."

== History ==
Minjung theology first began in South Korea in the 1950s and 1960s after the Korean War, and was preached in a minority of Protestant churches. The theology gained popularity in the 1970s during the dictatorship of Park Chung Hee and the Third Republic of Korea. The three Protestant theologians considered to be the creators of minjung theology are Ahn Byung-mu, Suh Nam-dong, and Maria Yu, who were all Kijang pastors who joined the minjung movement after the death of Jeon Tae-il. Jeon Tae-il was a factory worker and union organizer who had burned himself to death along with a copy of South Korea's labor laws in an act of political and religious protest. In 1972, Ahn Byung-mu wrote his first article on minjung as a theological theme, which he called "Jesus and Minjung." A Catholic writer and artist named Kim Chi-ha is credited with inspiring much of minjung thought with graphic depictions of the Korean Christ suffering alongside the minjung. Ahn Byung-mu, Suh Nam-dong, Hyun Young-Hak, and Kim Yong-Bock are considered first generation minjung theologians.

As South Korea has grown to be more a prosperous nation, later generations of minjung theologians have needed to reevaluate who are the poor and oppressed minjung of Korea. As such, a number of minjung theologians such as Park Soon-kyung have focused on questions of reunification with North Korea, identifying the minjung as all those oppressed in both Koreas. The Catholic Priests' Association for Justice (CPAJ) and Fr. Park Chang-Shin are associated with liberation theology in Korea.

In the 1970s theologians began exploring the theme of minjung liberation and many were removed from their positions at universities and seminaries for coming to the defense of those who were oppressed and imprisoned by the Park Chung Hee regime and the Korean Central Intelligence Agency.

== Theology ==
The word Minjung translates literally as "the mass of people," but a more comprehensive definition of the term is "those who are oppressed politically, exploited economically, alienated socially, and kept uneducated in cultural and intellectual matters." Another way of putting it is that the minjung are han-ridden people, which is a Korean word that roughly translates as resentment. Minjung theology is a belief that is concerned with the experience of the lower classes or the multitude. Ahn Byung Mu viewed Jesus as a collective event wherein Jesus comes as the Messiah for the poor and oppressed masses of people. In Korea, Jesus took on the role of the suffering and impoverished of the democratization movement. Minjung theology focuses on Jesus being the friend of the poor and his powerlessness during crucifixion leading up to his resurrection. Minjung theology views the oppressed masses as subjects of change rather than objects of history.

Minjung theology asserts that God speaks to all historical and cultural contexts including the conditions of Korea. Proponents of Minjung theology believe that the context of Korea is similar in many ways to the stories found in the bible, and that God is demonstrably on the side of the poor and oppressed throughout the books of the Bible.

Minjung is contrasted by the paeksung who accept oppression and the word inmin meaning a national identity. The Old Testament was written from the perspective of people in positions of power, but the stories are often about the liberation of the minjung. For instance, the Exodus, a story told from the perspective of Moses, is about the liberation of the Hebrew people from the oppressive rule of the Egyptian Pharaoh Rameses II. The Exodus story has parallels to Korean history because Koreans have endured under brutal governments for most of its history.

== Criticism ==
In his book Grassroots Asian Theology, Simon Chan criticizes minjung theology for being an elitist interpretation of grassroots theology in South Korea that ignores the actual beliefs of the minjung.

William Huang of the conservative MercatorNet has criticized believers in minjung theology for supporting restrictions on beef imports from America, encouraging peaceful dialogue with North Korea, and calling for the National Security Act to be repealed.

Hyunsook Park of Christian Today has criticized believers in minjung theology for not taking a literal interpretation of the bible, being more concerned with collective sin and structural violence than it is with individual sins, being more concerned with the material world rather than the eternal afterlife, for favoring the poor over other groups of people, and for being affirming of LGBT+ people.

Kim Jin-young of Christian Today has criticized proponents of minjung theology for putting Kim Il-sung, liberation, and labor before God. He also compared minjung theology with Juche.

Lee Youngjin of Christian Today has criticized minjung theology for putting people first rather than God.

== See also ==
- Contextual theology
- Christianity in Korea
- David Kwang-sun Suh
- Liberation theology
