= Undongkwon =

Social movement in South Korea

- Hangul: 운동권
- Hanja: 運動圈
- RR: Undonggwon
- MR: Undongkwŏn

Undongkwon or Undonggwon, which refers to "the movement sphere" in Korean, is a term associated with the Minjung movement in South Korea during the 1970s and the 1980s. The Minjung movement was a social movement that recognized the people who were culturally and systematically neglected by the South Korean government for economic advancement. The term, Undongkwon, is also understood as a "counter public sphere," which is an environment where Minjung movement activists can plan their beliefs and ideals against the commonly accepted belief systems. Alternatively, Undongkwon is conceptualized to include the individuals and any activists who were involved. They believed in laws and social movements which would prioritize helping the common person or citizen above all other governmental focuses. In addition to a strong alliance with laborers, they had an equal devotion to community which began the opposition to western culture and the South Korean government. At this revolutionary time, there were many mobilized groups against the South Korean public agenda such as student movements, visual arts movements Madanggŭk and labor movements.

== History ==
The Minjung is a Korean term that stands for "mass" or "the people". Minjung is a term that holds significant historical and cultural context. Minjung refers to the people who are oppressed politically, socially, and/or economically. The term has a great significance and meaning since it became identified with the struggle for democracy in South Korea in the 1970s-1980s. The term is also used and identified to understand the concept and view in which social reality is communicated. The term later became more focused upon the reality that was characterized by poverty, inequality, political oppression, and social dispute between rich and poor.

The mass of Koreans born in the 1930s and 1940s deeply believed in anti-communism and pro-Americanism beliefs. Such ideals include democracy, public safety, freedoms, and choice. They observed the United States as a model of how future Korea may become one day. The Undongkwon was both a culture and the individual activists who reassessed this perspective of the United States after colonial South Korea. Historically, Undongkwon activists were imagined by conservatives as insignificant pro- North Korean leftists, "the Reds" and anti-American. Within the Undongkwon culture, historical expectations and obligations were required to given up at the expense of the individual in order to fully commit for the communities pursuit of happiness. Additionally, activists believed entering activists were to also relinquish their own rights, educational status and privileges to join the movements. These activists challenged many aspects of South Korean idealism such as the government's view of the United States role in South Korea. During the Undongkwon's peak, constitutionalism and violence was most apparent within the June Democracy movement of 1987 which was considered a key moment in to a switch toward a more democratic government. Furthermore, to spread such beliefs and awareness of issues in South Korea, circles of conversation were conducted at every level and at every available forum which include underground, in open spaces, in factories, in farming villages, and in slum areas.

== Student movement ==
The movements originated from university students between 1970s and 1980s had revolutionary impacts on the democratic state of South Korea. Many of these activists gave up their bright futures to support ideals larger than themselves. For instance, some social activists left or were removed from their schools due their actions, lost their lives during rallies, some entered highly physical demanding worker jobs and some even gave up their lives. Controversial topics such as the current regime's legitimacy, questions of distribution of justice, the truth about the Gwangju Uprising and reunification were often debated intensely by the students within this movement. These student-driven movements also innovated strategies to develop, organize and articulate a “counter public sphere”. The student movement were a training ground for the Minjung movement as a whole because large amounts of the students who attended these early rallies later shifted their attention toward different movements within the Minjung movement which include labor, women, farmers, and urban-poor living issues that further developed in to the late 1980s. Campus demonstrations needed devote activists who were prepared to go to prison and incredibly careful planning In the beginning of the 1970s, the student demonstrations were brief in time. Some instances, the students would gather, march around campus or into near by streets and read controversial manifestos or statements. For instance, at Seoul National University, a large number of students participated in a demonstration circle in the campus a few times. After some time then walked toward the entrance gate where the riot police were posted. At this junction, students threw rocks at riot police who in response shot tear gas in to the crowd. Another pressing issue were to get more followers and increase awareness of the movement. Students resorted to drastic tactics like pulling school buildings’ fire alarms to gain enough time for their fellow students to distribute pamphlets among each other and in a visual way used mask-dance performances to begin protest demonstrations. Other techniques include raiding into movie theaters to pass out pamphlets or "banned books". One of the most iconic student democratic rebellions were the Gwanju Uprising. This movement was a protest in opposition to the election of Choi Kyu-hah, successor of presidency after president Park Chung Hee's death, and his non-democratic ideals. This ordeal quickly escalated and evolved into a large scale rebellion in Gwangju, South Korea. This event left 1,392 demonstrators arrested, including university students, with a death toll between 1,000 and 2,000.

Students were marked to affiliate themselves with the Undongkwon movement. In the late 1970s to the early 1980s for women it was straight hair, no makeup, and jeans. This was because they wanted to be recognized as equals between men. Women did not want a separate movement just for the women right because they wanted to be affiliated and seen as equals to men. For men in the Undongkwon movement it was a military training jacket, black rubber shoes, unwashed hard, and unshaven faces.

This effort of change was to ensure that no trace of individuality was present in order to make the Undongkwon movement more distinct. During school hours at universities, the students would never talk about the uprising movement but would rather have a hunch about who was in it and who was against it. Normally if you were out of the norms in the Korean lifestyle you were part of the Undongkwon movement.

== Traditional folk theater ==
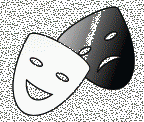
Masks were worn during maddangguk plays at schools and other events to promote the minjung movement

Many rehearsals for the Minjung movement was carried out through the 1970s to the 1980s. Madanggŭk was a traditional drama that combined Korean traditional for dramas with Westernized ideas and cultures. Madanggŭk was an array of everything you would normally see within a drama. It included stereotyped characters that were easily relatable to the audience, chain linked connections in between scenes, satires, comical gestures, dances, songs, and even jokes. These Madanggŭk's were performed usually outside for the public to see. This was because as the years progressed into the 1980s Madanggŭk's evolved from being purely dramas for enjoyment to a form of cultural and political expression.

Madanggŭk's popularity with expression of voice and political views swept across Korea. This became a site of a new form of art, social movement, and an overall new expression of politics and other subjectivity. Madanggŭk's had a major influence within university campuses which then spread over the years to influence factories, village squares, public halls, outdoor markets, and even Protestant and Catholic Churches.

Scholars had characterized Madanggŭk's as peoples' theater and resistance theater. As well as a unique expression of the Korean spirit. Many people saw performing in Madanggŭk's as not only a way to express examples of a political satire or as just a drama, but as an alternative way of living and working in the capitalist system. The capitalist system was challenged but the emergence of the Madanggŭk's because it was the expression and voice of the people that was presented in a comedic and entertaining way. Madanggŭk challenged the fine line that divided labor and leisure, producer and consumer, and landowner and the workers.

The counter public sphere, Undongkwon was portrayed in multiple plays and songs to represent the important role that the young had played in questioning the legitimacy of the military regime, distributive justice, and the other region of the divided Korea.

== Labor movements ==
From the 1970s-1980's, a counter-public sphere was created by intellectuals and laborers. This sphere reformulated the identities, interests, and needs of the individuals within this community. This alliance consisted of students, Christian labor organization, and many other intellectuals. This flowed into students joining the workforce and becoming worker-student solidarity (nohak yondae).

A small number of dissident intellectuals and university students were thus poised to become involved in labor in the early 1970s. There were three general groups that were involved in the labor force throughout the 1970s. These three groups were textile workers, Christian organizations, and factory workers. The movement's goal was to change South Korean society. This group raised issues about low wages, dangerous working conditions, and violations of labor laws.

In relation to Korean women under the labor force, they had less than half of the pay for men and were the ones to work the longer hours throughout the day. In addition, all workers in the labor force had experienced extremely unhealthy and unsafe working conditions that were caused by the negligence of factory owners and managers. Labor workers were known to be culturally humiliated and looked down upon by management and society.

Jeon Tae-il was a 22-year-old worker who worked in the textile industry in Seoul, Korea. To bring awareness to this movement and situation that is occurring within the garment industry he poured gasoline and set himself on fire. His last words were, "we workers are human beings too and we should be guaranteed basic labor rights. Do not let my death be in vain."

A few student activists began to think their social movement might have been too preoccupied with political issues and they worked on the idea that social change and democracy might involve a wider structure toward their goal and bring some organization to their plans on the labor movement. They decided to bring structural organization to elements in society, particularly the labor force.

== See also ==
- Korean protest songs
