= Hong Song-dam =

South Korean artist (born 1955)

- Hangul: 홍성담
- Hanja: 洪性淡
- RR: Hong Seongdam
- MR: Hong Sŏngdam

Hong Song-dam (Korean: 홍성담; Hanja: 洪性淡; born 1955) is a South Korean artist specializing in woodcuts and best known for his involvement in the Minjung movement. He was born on the island of Hauido and raised in Gwangju, where he took part in the 1980 uprising against Chun Doo-hwan's military dictatorship.

He became well known for making prints related to the acts committed by the government under Chun in Seoul, leading to much controversy surrounding his art. In July 1989, he was arrested for allegedly breaking the National Security Act (he had sent slides of a mural he had created, along with around 200 other South Korean artists, to North Korea). Amnesty International adopted him as a prisoner of conscience, and he was released from prison in the early 1990s. He is an acclaimed member of the Minjung art movement, and in 1996 was commissioned by the Government of South Korea to create a 42-metre mural for Chonnam National University. Much of his art is inspired by his political ideals centered around anti-censorship and anti-imperialism, critiquing the acts of the Korean government and the US involvement with Korea after the Korean War. To this day, he is still an avid political activist and artist and has not been given a US visa due to his commentary on President Park Geun-hye and US-Korea relations.

== Early life ==
Hong attended Chosun University in Gwangju studying visual arts. During college he dealt with poverty and suffered from tuberculosis and was a political activist during the May 18 Gwangju Uprising in 1980. In 1979, he was a founding member of the activist artist group the Gwangju Freedom Artists' Association. This group produced Minjung Art, with messages focused on anti-imperialism, Marxist ideologies, anti-Western visions, and liberation of the oppressed.He vocalized antimilitary sentiments by creating monumental hanging paintings (걸개, geolgae) and woodcut prints. He also played an active role in the protests as a member of the citizen army, distributing food and pamphlets. After the Gwangju Uprising, Hong became even more politically involved in protesting government censorship.

== Artwork ==
=== Minjung Movement ===
Many of Hong's works in the 1980s dealt with the acts committed by the Korean government under Chun Doo-hwan's dictatorship. Hong's work can be organized into a rough timeline, starting with the Gwangju Uprising in May 1980 and continuing for the next few decades, even following his imprisonment in 1987. This imprisonment was based on charges of collaborating with North Korea after he designed a mural critical of South Korean life. It was before the Gwangju Freedom Artists Association exhibition in 1980 that the Gwangju Uprising began. In 1983, the Gwangju Freedom Artists Association opened the Citizen Art School in Gwangju to teach printmaking and lessons on Korean folklore.

==== May (1981-1989) ====
After the Gwangju Uprising, the Korean government censored any photographs or newspapers documenting the event, leading Hong Song-dam to begin making woodcuts and linoleum prints depicting the event as an act of protest towards the censorship and a way to spread the information about the event, as well as foster community in Gwangju after the Uprising. May is a series of woodcuts about the Uprising, featuring 50 prints. Works from the May series include Tears of Blood (1983), which shows a police officer wielding a baseball bat at a protester. The most famous work from the series is Utopia (1984), which shows a truck full of men carrying guns and women carrying trays of food. The work is meant to depict community organizing against the militia government as well as acts of community care and support in the face of an oppressive government.

==== Dawn (1980-1987) ====
Dawn is a collection of woodblock carvings depicting the Gwangju Uprising and the censorship and suppression of the Uprising. The work consists of 49 black-and-white woodblock prints. One example, March to the Provincial Office, depicts a woman carrying stones gesturing to a burning car in a city square.Mother, another work in the series, shows a woman holding her child and a rifle.

==== Resurrection (1989) ====
Resurrection is a woodcut print that depicts a lotus flower emerging from land that is being toiled by local farmers. Underneath the farmland is a man lying on his back holding a rifle. Its use of nature, working class farmers, and emphasis on injustice is reminiscent of Minjung Art. The lotus flower, a Korean symbol indicating "new life," represents a resurrection of the working class. His political views are strongly present in this piece, which tells the viewer that new life comes from overcoming the injustice perpetuated by the state towards agricultural workers and warriors.

==== The History of the People's Liberation Movement (1989) ====
The painting The History of the People's Liberation Movement is a 77 meter long hanging painting with multiple panels depicting images of Korea's liberation movements against government atrocities, including the Gwangju Uprising. This painting was designed by Hong and worked on by him and 200 other artists. After the painting was destroyed by police in South Korea, Hong sent slides of the mural to North Korea, leading to his imprisonment.

=== Murals ===
Hong Song-dam has made series of murals depicting historical events as well as his experiences being tortured during imprisonment. These large-scale murals include: Faded Tears in The Moonlight (1994), which tells the event of the Tonghak Peasant Rebellion, New Paradise in Dream (2002) and Ritual Paper Flower (2003), which shows the 9/11 attack with hordes of people drawn in the style of anime-derived video game characters, both torturing each other and partaking in sexual acts beneath the towers. This mural is meant to criticize the normalization of capitalist imperialism. These murals all contain motifs from Hong's older works, as well as the Minjung Movement, such as agricultural life and references to Korean folklore.

=== Sewol Ferry Disaster ===
On April 16, 2014, the Sewol ferry sank off the coast of South Korea, killing more than 300 passengers on board, including about 250 high school students. Hong Song-dam responded to the disaster by creating a series of paintings showing his outrage at the then President Park Geun-hye.

==== Sewol-Owol (2014) ====
Sewol-Owol is a 10 meter by 2.4 meter painting showing the sinking Sewol Ferry being lifted out of the air by Korean community members, surrounded by images of South Korea's political history, including Park Geun-hye being puppeteered by her father, Park Chung Hee. Hong was deeply angered by the lack of action from political and business elites during the Disaster who could have saved the ferry. The painting's title, "Owol (May)," recalls the Gwangju Uprising. This work was meant to be shown at the Gwangju Biennale. However, the Korean government pulled it from the exhibition, because of its unflattering parodies of the President.

==== Du˘lsum, Nalsum (2016) ====
Du˘lsum, Nalsum is a series of 14 paintings referencing the Sewol Ferry Disaster that was shown in Ansan in 2016. This collection is meant to show the last moments of the high schoolers who died in the accident. 10:20 AM April 16, 2014 shows the boat being submerged in water with children crying for help in the window. Sound of the Last Breathing shows three children, mostly submerged in water, reaching up to the sky. Some of these paintings depict Hong's own charged experiences with the government, including Bathtub: Mother, I Can See the Blue Sea in the My Hometown 2, showing an image of Hong Song-dam himself being waterboarded in the interrogation rooms during his time in prison at the Anti-Communist Interrogation Office.

==== The Stabbing of Ki-Jong Kim (2015) ====
In the painting The Stabbing of Ki-Jong Kim, Hong references an event in March 2015, where a Korean protester named Ki-Jong Kim attacked the US ambassador Mark Lippert. At the center of the painting, an essay written by the artist on the international relationships between the US, Korea and Japan covers a tabletop. The essay does not mention the event involving Ki-Jong Kim, but instead criticizes Korea's inability to ideologically, economically, and politically separate itself from the United States. Around the tabletop are Ki-Jong Kim and Mark Lippert in a physical fight.
