= Reality and Utterance =

Korean art group (1979–1989)

Reality and Utterance (Korean: 현실과 발언, romanized: Hyeonsil Gwa Bareon) was a minjung (people’s) is an art group active from 1979 to 1989. The group membership consisted of art critics and artists who wanted to make art that not only reflected the everyday joys and political struggles of Korean society, but also actively transformed socio-political realities. Members of this group made art that was a reaction against and in opposition to the state-supported modern art, namely dansaekhwa and international abstraction. As the name of this group suggests they wanted to "speak truth with art" about the state of Korean society despite the harsh censorship of the government.

== Prehistory ==
The group’s artistic ideas grounded in socially critical realism can be traced back to the Reality Group (Hyonsil Dongin). In 1969, Reality Group was formed by 3 fine arts majors from Seoul National University: O Yun, O Kyounghwan, and Im Saetaek. Their manifesto was drafted by protester and poet, Kim Chiha, and it was edited by Kim Yunsu. The manifesto took its inspiration from leftist literature and advocated for nationalism (minjok juui) and socially critical realism through satire (hyonsil pungja) in art. They sought to create a visual language informed by anti-imperialist and leftist aesthetics by looking to non-Western examples of nationalist art- like the realism of Mexican Muralist, Diego Rivera.

Reality Group's inaugural exhibition was censored and most leftist intellectuals and artists at the time fled to North Korea after the partition. Thereafter, South Korea banned works by artists and writers who fled to the North (wolpuk jakka). In 1979, O Yun would become the founding member of Reality and Utterance.

== Founding (1979) ==
Reality and Utterance launched in December 1979 by critics Sung Wan-kyung, Choi Min, Won Dong-suk, Yun Bom-mo, and a dozen artists like Kim Jung Heun, Min Jeung-Ki and Nho Wonhee. Members were primarily born in the 1940s and had already graduated from art school. The group's name came from an essay called, "The Monopoly of Utterance and the Fall of Idiom" by Sung Wan-kyung.

== Artistic ideals ==
The group's ideals were in line with the Minjung art movement which sought to expose the powers that were shaping the current structure of reality through socially engaged artwork. Reality and Utterance was one of many art groups making minjung art and was not the originator of the movement.

Artists from Reality and Utterance wanted to engage the public with current issues and transform the exclusive and inaccessible system of art production and reception that was endorsed by the government. These ideals manifested in the group's use of figuration, narrative, "low" art forms (such as billboards, magazine ads, posters, cartoons, and kitsch paintings). Kitsch aesthetics (like in Min Joung-ki's work) painted in oil questioned whether it was possible to challenge the aesthetic values associated with originality and overseas art styles by reengaging popular arts and folk visual culture that has always persisted and shifted with the times.

The critical realism (hyonsil juui) within their work was not confined to style- it was a political process of developing artistic subjectivity based on the potential of art to change the everyday reality amid the democratization movement. Therefore, this group's work and goals have nothing in common with the hyperrealistic painting style (kuk sasilhuui) that was popular in the mid–to-late 1970s. Not all realisms (hyonsil juui) championed the ideals of the democratization movement.

=== Manifesto ===
The manifesto of Reality and Utterance stated its intentions to, "recover the true and active role of art in a journey toward the new age, by creatively executing art through collective work and theory." Members believed that, "collective art has, in any form, alienated and neglected the true reality of itself and its neighbors by catering to the materialistic taste of the leisure class of by clinging to the high-toned idea of amusement." The manifesto also posed open-ended, abstract, and philosophical questions: How is utterance delivered? In what myths and institutions is utterance formulated? What is reality? How do we view and feel reality? What should the methods of utterance be? What does utterance mean? The members approached these questions in their own ways while holding group exhibitions that explored new methods of painterly investigation.

== Exhibitions and selected pieces ==
The group's exhibitions served to explore new methods of painterly investigation. In their exhibitions with everyday themes, they aspired to show visual, social, and political realities. Their exhibitions were built on collective discussions, based on which they would produce work to be shown in a few months or weeks. Themed exhibitions (chujejon) offered opportunities for testing relations between art and its surrounding social reality but they also discouraged artists from re-exhibiting previously produced works or developing a signature style in a manner that ultimately profited the art market.

1980 : The inaugural show (Oct. 17, 1980) was planned to be held at Korea Arts and Culture Education Service (Arte) Art Hall. A catalog included their manifesto printed for viewers to read. The art hall abruptly canceled the exhibition rental contract and turned light off based on the excuse that the works were,"not right for the times." Artists held candlelights for 30 minutes as a protest, but their efforts were in vain.

The group re-presented the first exhibition at Dongsanbang Hwarand in Insa-dong, central Seoul, on Nov. 13, 1980. The works presented there critiqued consumerism, government oppression in daily life, and the divided country. The artists saw their works as "voicing the unspoken truth."

In this show, Oh Yoon (1946-86) exhibited Hell Painting No. 1 (1980) from his Marketing series (1980-1981). Yoon appropriated the style of a traditional Buddhist Hell (naraka) paintings and featured billboards, merchandise displays, and torture to satirize the aggressive corporate marketing tactics and the egregious proliferation of ads in the built environment.

1981: The City and Vision Exhibition addressed the rapidly shifting visual culture in South Korea as industrialization and modernization continued in the country.

Min Joung-ki (b. 1949) copied kitsch painting sold on the streets and exhibited Embrace (1981), which featured a couple embracing in a kiss amid a clichéd, yet uncanny, abstract nightscape. These "cliched paintings" tried to show recognition of the authenticity found in the common people's consumption of inauthentic popular images that were judged as bad taste of a false utopia.

Kim Jeong-heon (b. 1946) exhibited his painting, Creating Affluent Life — Lucky Monoryum (1981). The artist copied imagery from an ad for high-class linoleum floor in a women’s magazine and added a painted image of a peasant's laboring back on the lower part of the work. Peasant labor is highlighted as the main subject within an elite, lavish home setting, thus disrupting the "domestic complacency buoyed by items of conspicuous consumption."

1982: The Appearance of Happiness Exhibition explored "lifestyle" discourse in the mass media caused by the introduction of color tv in Korea.

1984: The 6.25 Exhibition focused on the divided state of the nation in the wake of the Korean War which started June 24, 1950.

=== Retrospective ===
2020 marked the 40th anniversary of Reality and Utterance. 16 of the artists came together to make a group exhibition at Hakgojae Gallery titled Art and Words. The show's title came from a bulletin that expressed the group's wishes to "be of help for a wider understanding of art, and become the foundation for the exchange of opinions," written in 1982 for the group's exhibition at Deoksu Museum. Artists Kang Yo-bae, Kim Geun-hee, Kim Jung-heun, Noh Won-hee, Min Joong-ki, Park Bul-dong, Park Jae-dong, Sung Wan-kyung, Son Jang-sup, Shin Kyoung-ho, Shim Jun-soo, Ahn Kyu-chul, Lee Tae-ho, Lim Ok-sang, Chung Dong-suk, and Joo Jae-hwan showed 106 new and old works that encompassed painting, installation, and photography. The juxtaposition of recent and old works exemplified how their philosophies and styles have changed or stayed the same.

For example, Min Joong-ki's etching Superman is Born (1980) was displayed next to two oil painting from his 2019 series Gubo's Haircut and other work 1939, made in 2020. The show included the programs for visitors to converse with the artists. There was also an open discussions called "Utterance of 1980 and Utterance of 2020" and "Art in the Post-Covid-19 Era."

== Members ==
- Sung Wan-kyung
- O Yun
- Choi Min
- Won Dong-suk
- Yun Bommo
- Kim Jung-heun
- Min Joong-ki
- Nho Wonhee
- Kang Yo-bae
- Kim Geun-hee
- Park Bul-dong
- Park Jae-dong,
- Son Jang-sup
- Shin Kyoung-ho
- Shim Jun-soo
- Ahn Kyu-chul
- Lee Tae-ho
- Lim Ok-sang
- Chung Dong-suk
- Joo Jae-hwan
