= Kim Dong-in =

Korean writer (1900–1951)

- 김동인
- Born: October 2, 1900
- Died: January 5, 1951 (aged 50)
- Writing career
- Pen name: Geumdong, Chunsa, Kim Sieodim
- Language: Korean

- Kim Dong-in
- Hangul: 김동인
- Hanja: 金東仁
- RR: Gim Dongin
- MR: Kim Tongin

Kim Dong-in (Korean: 김동인; October 2, 1900 – January 5, 1951) was a Korean writer.

== Biography ==
Kim Dong-in, born on October 2, 1900, in Pyongyang, South Pyongan Province, Korean Empire, was a pioneer of realism and naturalism in Modern Korean literature. A son of a wealthy landowner, like many other young Korean intellectuals Kim took his higher education in Japan, attending the Meiji Academy in Tokyo and entering the Kawabata School of Fine Arts. Kim dropped out when he decided to pursue writing as a career. In 1919, Kim and other advocates for "art-for-art's-sake-literature," launched the influential but transitory journal Creation (Changjo) in Japan along with Joo Yohan, Jeon Yeongtaek, Choi Seungman, and Kim Hwan. Creation took a stand against the didactic literature ("national literature" to put it another way) proposed by Yi Gwangsu, In Creation Kim published his debut story, "The Sorrows of the Weak" (Yakhanjaui seulpeum). In 1925, Kim published one of his most famous works, "Potato," which was a breakthrough in Korean "realist" fiction and a further salvo in his ongoing literary war with Yi Gwangsu.

Kim lived an extravagant lifestyle (thanks to the inheritance received from his father) until 1930, at which point his finances began to fail. Kim's financial situation led him to depression and drug abuse. Until this point, Kim had been a purist (colloquial and realistic) but he now turned to popular serials, which he had previously spurned. Among these were a number of historical novels (listed below). In 1934, Kim published, somewhat ironically considering their different stances on literature, the first in-depth study of Yi Gwangsu, "A Study of Chunwon" (Chunwon yeongu); in 1935, Kim launched the monthly magazine Yadam.

In 1939, still poor and now ill, Kim joined Park Yong-hui, Lim Hak-su and others in a visit to Manchuria that was sponsored by the North Chinese Imperial Army. This was clearly an act of collaboration and is regarded, even today in Korea, as a stain on his literary career. In 1942, however, Kim was jailed on charges of lese-majesty against the Emperor of Japan.

In 1946, after Korean liberation, Kim was critical in forming the Pan-Korea Writers Association which countered other organizations promoting proletarian literature.

In the years that followed, Kim published stories, including "The Traitor" (Banyeokja, 1946) and "Man Without a Nation" (Manggugingi, 1947). These works, ironically, provided a sharp critique of Lee Gwang-su and other writers who collaborated with the Japanese during the occupation. On January 5, 1951, Kim died at his home in Seoul.

In 1955, the magazine Sasangye (Korean:The World of Thoughts) created the Dong-in Literary Award to commemorate Kim's literary achievements.

== Work ==
Kim Dong-in is best known for his short stories that combine exquisite aesthetic sensibilities with succinct prose style and objective perspective. He first drew attention with the publication of such naturalist stories as "Distinguished Statement" (Myeongmun, 1924), "Hwang the Rustic" (Sigol Hwangseobang, 1925) and "Potato" (Gamja, 1921). In particular, "Potato,"a story of a woman who gradually loses all sense of decency and degenerates into a common prostitute as she tries to overcome economic hardships, is noted for the author's use of realism and deterministic viewpoint to defy traditional morality and the didactic use of literature advocated by Yi Gwangsu's enlightenment movement. In an era dominated by Proletarian Movement and New Tendency School of Thought, when art was utilized to further ideological debates and social changes, Kim Dong-in upheld the vision of pure aestheticism and the autonomy of literature as art. This view is reflected in his aestheticist fiction such as "Sonata Appassionato" (Gwangyeom sonata, 1930) and "Gwanghwasa Temple" (Gwanghwasa, 1930) which feature mad artists in pursuit of artistic perfection.

Many of Kim's stories have been adapted to film. Fellow Korean author Kim Seungok wrote the screenplay and directed the first adaptation of "Potato" which was released in 1968. The story was adapted again in 1987 by director Byun Jang-ho. Other works which made it to the screen are as follows: The Young Ones (1985) directed by Ko Seong-ui, Identical Toes (1976) directed by Kim Soo-yong, Sonata Appassionato (1979) directed by Ko Young-nam, Gwanghwa Temple (1974) directed by Joo Dong-jin, and Baettaragi (1973) directed by Lee Kyu-hwan.

== Works in English ==
- Sweet Potato: Collected Short Stories by Kim Tongin (2017), 14 stories translated by Grace Jung, published by Honford Star
- "Potato" in Modern Korean Fiction: An Anthology
- "The Rock" in Meetings and Farewells: Modern Korean Stories
- The Post Horse in Meetings and Farewells: Modern Korean Stories
- "The Red Hills: A Doctor's Diary" in Modern Korean Short Stories
- "The Seaman's Chant" in The Rainy Spell and Other Korean Stories
- "The Photograph and the Letter" in A Ready-Made Life: Early Masters of Modern Korean Fiction
- "Tale of a Mad Painter" (1935) 광화사, translated by Stephen Epstein (1921)

== Works in Korean (Partial) ==
Historical Novels:

- The Young Ones (Jeolmeun geudeul, 1930–1931)
- Spring at Unhyeongung Palace (Unhyeongungui bom, 1933)
- The Decline of the Dynasty (Wangbuui nakjo, 1935)
- Great Prince Suyang (Dae Suyang, 1941)

Collections:

- Life (Moksum, 1924)
- Potato (Gamja 1935)
- Short Stories of Kim Dong-in (Kim Dong-in danpyeonjip, 1939)
- The Sunset of the Palace (1941)
- Roaming (Baehoe, 1941)
- Identical Toes (Balgaragi dalmatda, 1948)
- A Weak Man's Sorrow (Yakhan ja-ui seulpeum 1919)
- Baettaragi (1921)
- Flogging (Taehyeong 1922)
- The Wedding (Gyeolhonsik 1931)
- Traitor (Banyeokja 1946)
- Popularity of a Ruined Nation (Manggukin-gi 1947)

== See also ==
- Korean literature
- List of Korean novelists
