= Hanil University =

University in Wanju, South Korea

Coordinates: 35.76363°N 127.20641°E

- Hangul: 한일장신대학교
- Hanja: 韓一長神大學校
- RR: Hanil jangsin daehakgyo
- MR: Hanil changsin taehakkyo

Hanil University (Korean: 한일장신대학교) is a private university located in Wanju, South Korea. Started with the merger of the Neel Bible School, founded in 1922 by nursing missionary, Elisabeth Shepping and the Hamilton Bible School founded in Jeonju a year later by medical missionary, M. Ingold. It is described as "an education institute ratified by the General Assembly of the Presbyterian Church in Korea (Tonghap)" to "foster leaders of the regional societies and churches by nurturing outstanding individuals equipped with religious character and scholarly intelligence."
