= Minjung =

Korean word for "the people"

- Hangul: 민중
- Hanja: 民衆
- RR: minjung
- MR: minjung

Minjung (Korean: 민중) refers to the Korean pro-democracy movement of the second half of the 20th century.

== Etymology ==
Minjung is a Korean word that combines the two hanja characters min (民) and jung (衆). Min is from inmin (인민; 人民), which may be translated as "the people", and jung is from daejung (대중; 大衆), which may be translated as "the public". Thus, minjung can be translated to mean "the masses" or "the people."

However, in the Korean political and cultural context, "the public" is not an adequate translation, and "the people" carries a communist connotation that makes its use dangerous in anti-communist South Korea. Nonetheless, "the people" is close to what minjung seeks to convey, both sociologically and politically. For Koreans, minjung are those who are oppressed politically, exploited economically, marginalized sociologically, despised culturally, and condemned religiously. For example, the Minjung Party founded in October 2017.

Thus, the notion of minjung came to identify and inform the struggle for democracy in South Korea. In other words, the concept of minjung functions as a type of worldview that offers the categories in which social reality is organized and comprehended. One of the basic precepts of this worldview is that history should be understood from the point of view of the minjung, or that the minjung are the subjects (and not victims) of history.

The idea of Minjung can be traced back to the late Joseon dynasty's Silhak movement through the works of Chŏng Yagyong and Yi Hwang.

== Background ==
After the Korean War ended and South Korea ran its own government under their first president, Syngman Rhee, there were several military coups and forces involved in a reformation of the new government. Notably, there was President Park Chung Hee (1961–1979, namely the Third and Fourth Republic) and President Chun Doo-hwan (1980-1988, namely the Fifth Republic).

=== Park Chung-hee (1961–1979) ===
While Minjung (the mass of people) was suffering and struggling from a decade of mismanagement and corruption by the Rhee presidency (aka First Republic era), a major student uprising, and some American interference, managed to oust Syngman Rhee. Afterwards, a group of military officers led by General Park Chung Hee seized power in South Korea through a coup d'état, and declared himself chairman of supreme council. Under pressure by the United States, Park finally resign his post and narrowly won the Presidential election in October 1963. The period from 1965 to 1971 was one of rapid economic growth and comparative political stability. To achieve economic stability, Park Chung Hee created the first Five-Year Economic Development Plan (to start in 1962), the first such overall development program ever prepared for Korea. The five-year plan gave priority to the following things:

1. Development of energy industries such as coal production and electric power
2. Expansion of agricultural production aimed at increasing farm income and correction of the structural imbalance of the national economy
3. Development of basic industries and the economic infrastructure
4. Maximum utilization of idle resources; increased employment; conservation and utilization of land
5. Improvement of the balance of payments through export promotion
6. Promotion of science and technology.

Park ran for reelection in 1967, and became the president of the Third and Fourth Republic of Korea; he served for 16 years.

== Minjung movement ==
=== Labor movements ===
==== YH Company protest ====
In August 1979, around 200 young female workers at YH Trading Company protested the company's decision to close down. YH had become a huge wig exporting company during the 1960s; however, the company's position had significantly deteriorated by the end of the 1970s.

On August 7, 1979, YH Company closed down. The young women workers protested and fasted against the company's closure. The police got involved and forcefully removed the women from the building. During this violent action, one young worker was killed. Her death was significant and triggered many protest movements throughout South Korea. It may be considered one of the most important sparks of opposition towards President Park Chung Hee and the demise of his presidency.

=== Gwangju Democratization Movement ===
The Gwangju Democratization Movement, officially renamed the Gwangju Uprising in 1987, began on May 18, 1980. The citizens of Gwangju, seeking the abolition of martial law and the resignation of General Chun Doo-hwan, initiated the movement. As General Chun Doo-hwan and the military tried to maintain martial law, students and some civilians came together to demonstrate their disapproval. On May 18, 200 male students tried to enter a school that was forced into closure by officials. During the attempt, the students were heavily injured. Seeing this, civilians decided to join in but were stopped by military forces. In the end, many civilians were injured and killed, thus starting the Gwangju Movement. On May 19, as the movement grew to 5000 civilians, the military brought in an armoured motorcar and marched in with guns wielding fixed-bayonets. On May 20, 200,000 civilians marched through the military force and stopped all communications systems in the city so the military would not bring in reinforcements. Thus, Gwangju was freed.

Chun Doo-hwan was the ROK army general and president of South Korea from 1980 to 1988. Chun started his coup by making himself head of the KCIA and keeping his position as head of the Defense Security of Command. Minjung gathered to the streets to protest and demonstrate their opinions about Chun's action. On May 17, 1980, Chun declared martial law to finalize his coup. Chun fired and arrested high officials and students who were opposed to his actions. On the next day, martial law was declared and about 500 people came together to Gwangju's streets to protest and demand the repeal of the martial law. "One woman student was pilloried near the town square, where a paratrooper attacked her breasts with a bayonet." The soldiers shot and killed people who kept protesting and refused to go home. Gwangju Rebellion is also called Gwangju massacre because of the number of casualties inflicted on the protesters. It is unclear how many people actually died in the Gwangju Rebellion, but one source indicates the number to be between 2,300 and 4,900 deaths in May 1980.

As a result of this chaos, Chun took it upon himself to isolate about 37,000 journalists, students, teachers, labor organizers, and civil servants in condemned and confined camps up in the mountain areas to promote "a time of cleansing their minds and spirits." Chun was not willing to let these movements go without making it very clear that he was not going to tolerate this. He said he was setting up these boot camps for those "who would see the error of their ways after lots of push-ups, marathon running, small-group criticism and self-criticism, and ideological exhortation."

=== World-wide democratization ===
The 1980s marked a worldwide spark of democratization. The decline of the Soviet Union Bloc led to the breakdown of European Communist regimes in 1989. The Polish Solidarity Movement is one example of major revolutions during the 1980s. Much of dictatorships in Latin America also collapsed. In Philippines, the ousting of dictator Ferdinand Marcos and the subsequent "yellow revolution" led the way to democratization. These circumstances worldwide bear resemblance with the fall of the Chun regime, and the revolutions are akin to the Gwangju incident (albeit the discrepancies in human casualties). Scholar Samuel P. Huntington referred to this period as the "Third Wave" of Democratization.

=== Anti-American sentiments ===
The United States' supposed involvement in the Gwangju Democratization Struggle triggered the rapid spread of anti-Americanism sentiments. The protesters were expecting Americans to intervene for their side. Instead, the Twentieth Division of the ROK Army was sent to the area in response to the uprising. Although many Koreans, and especially those who had favored or participated in the movement, blamed the U.S. Government for "releasing" these troops from their duties near the DMZ, the American general in charge of defending against North Korean (DPRK) attack had no idea that they were going to be moved. He was awakened by a late-night telephone call by the ROK president, informing him that the Twentieth had been removed from their positions along the DMZ—thus creating a huge gap in the defensive line in the event of large-scale infiltration from the North—and sent south to Gwangju. Nevertheless, because the U.S. Command was nominally in control of joint forces, the urban legend persists that the United States was responsible for the forcible repression of the uprising by military means. Because of this, the US took a portion of the blame:

There may not have been an alternative to turning a cold shoulder to the citizens of Gwangju... But American operational control under the United States-South Korean Combined Forces Command made U.S. responsibility inescapable, and the release of frontline troops made hash of Carter's human rights policies; the United States paid dearly for both in Korean attitudes thereafter.

Initially, before Gwangju, there were negative attitudes towards the United States growing because of their support of Chun Doo-hwan. But Gwangju really catalyzed the Anti-Americanism among Koreans.

=== Student protests ===
During the presidential election in March 1960, Syngman Rhee sought out a fourth term. Considering his age of eighty-five, there was serious concern for Rhee's health and his future fulfillment of leadership within the Liberal Party. Therefore, in order to maintain power, the Liberal Party gained the desire to win at all costs. The Liberal Party did end up winning the election; Syngman Rhee and Yi Kibung (Vice President) officially won. However, the election process was corrupted. The "ballot boxes had been stuffed with votes for the government candidates even before the voting took place." In reaction to the Liberal Party's rigged victory, the outraged citizens and students of all ages protested through street demonstrations. As a declaration indicting the government's abuse of power, on April 19, 1960, Yi Sujong expressed: "We want to plant the seeds of reason, truth, freedom, and the spirit of the university in the barren soil of our country." Through the protest, the students became a power of influence among the people of Korea. Although the South Korean government had claimed to be a "democratic" nation, its actions did not display the exercise of democracy. The students sparked a vital movement in South Korea. These protests are evidence of students understanding of their own power and capabilities to influence the nation. Students were fervent in their search for their own rights because they learned from history. A middle schooler by the name of Kim Chu-yol in a sense became a symbol of the sacrifice for freedom. They needed to fight for their rights just like their fathers. "Look at the torch of freedom that we are now raising! Listen, in these hours of darkness, as we proudly toll the bell of freedom, just as our fathers and elder brothers did under the iron yoke of the Japanese imperialist". This was a new type of movement to which Korea was not accustomed which would be a key instrument in allowing students to begin to voice their opinions and fight for their rights.

=== Normalization Treaty protest ===
In the 1960s, Park Chung Hee saw normalization of relations with Japan as a way to gain start-up capital for industrial development. Mass demonstrations ensued against the signing of the normalization treaty. Demonstrators were met with military force in 1964, but in 1965, the treaty was ratified.

=== Importance of the church ===
Following the model of Liberation Theology established in the Latin American states, the Korean Catholic church became a haven for those opposing Park Chung Hee's policies. This was largely due to governmental agencies', particularly the KCIA, reluctance to use military force against the church. The issues of democratization and evangelism were conflated, and some church leaders went so far as to lead protests against the authoritarian regime. The Minjung movement utilized theological arguments to support and legitimize the move towards a more democratic state. The model of Liberation Theology was viable in Korea due to the relatively high percentage of Koreans who practiced Christianity. (In 2005, approximately 1/3 of the Korean population claimed to be practicing Christians). The church provided a unique haven for anti-authoritarian dissent to develop.

== Movement influences ==
=== Kim Chi-ha ===
Born in the southwestern province of Cholla, Kim Chi-ha is known for being a critic that played a large role in the Pak regime. Participation in anti-government activities, resulted in his multiple arrests which granted him the time to write a satire in experimental pan'sori form, "Five Bandits" (Korean: 오적; RR: Ojeok; MR: Ojŏk). This poem expresses his opposition towards the corrupt authoritarian government. "The poem condemned the five core power groups of the Pak regime - business tycoons, members of the National Assembly of South Korea (legislature), senior government officials, generals, and cabinet ministers - as 'five bandits' who had brazenly acquired wealth by illicit means." As a result of the poem's publication, Kim Chiha was arrested on the charge of "abetting the propaganda lines" of North Korea. In 1974, Kim Chiha was sentenced to death for violating the National Security Act and instigating rebellion. However, due to protesters such as Willy Brandt, Jean-Paul Sartre and Oe Kenzaburo, he was released in 1979.

=== Kim Dae-jung ===
One of the great leaders of the cause was Kim Dae-jung (or Kim Taejung), who stated that the economic development doesn't have to come with sacrifice of democracy and political freedom. Kim Dae-jung is often described as "a fierce and articulate critic, Kim castigated the government for abuses of power, corruption, and the social inequities created thereby and made an appeal for those who had not shared in the economic growth or who had been victimized by human rights violations." Fierce critics such as Kim Dae-jung won wide popularity with the people of South Korea. Such men with devotion to steer the nation into a democratic nation fueled the students and white collars to achieve what we call Minjung movement today. With significant efforts from Minjung, "a mass movement for democracy, embracing students, workers, and many in the middle class, finally brought a democratic breakthrough in Korea."

Such powerful leaders like Kim Dae-jung pay a price for standing up for what they believe in. He was "subjected to frequent political persecution and even targeted for assassination attempts". Through his devotion and criticism of an unfair government he was "sentenced to death on a false charge" which was later relieved through the United States. He still had to suffer by staying in jail for four years where he was under partial solitary confinement. Kim Dae-jung, undeterred, took advantage of his jail time to reflect and recharge. He worked through all the obstacles the government enforced such as "being exiled to the United States" and "prohibited from engaging in political activities". Kim Dae-jung would not have the reputation of a fierce and one of the many great leaders if he had not kept fighting as he did. He ran for presidency three times and finally was elected in 1997 "marking the first time an opposition party candidate had won a presidential election in South Korea".

==== Democracy ====
According to Kim Dae-jung, democracy is essential to the people of South Korea because it gives the people some sense of ownership over their nation. It gives them freedom and motivates them to defend it. Kim Dae-jung admits that because of Korean's history and culture which was heavily influenced by Buddhism and Confucianism, it is difficult for South Korea to adapt to Democracy. Democracy is an idea that was invented by the Western civilization. However, this instrument can be used in South Korea if the people of South Korea want to serve under the principles of democracy which is freedom, justice, and human dignity. Kim Dae-jung argues that South Korea does yearn for democracy. Even when you look at the history of the Tonghak Rebellion, this resistance occurred because the peasants wanted equality and less corruption. Even before South Korea became a democratic nation, the people wanted this political government.

Kim Dae-jung believes that the most ideal economic system for a democratic nation would be a free enterprise system. However, he argues that although South Korea claims to be a democratic nation with free enterprise, this nation does not follow its principles. There is no free competition. South Korea is filled with big corporations with monopolies that are protected by the government which eliminates all competition. Also, he argues that in a free enterprise system, society and government should be able to provide and protect the working class. He even goes on to say that "the workers in our country are the other major role players". However, the authoritarian government abuses these workers and their freedom. They are treated unjustly and are not fairly rewarded. Also, there is no balance between the social classes. There is such a huge division between the higher class and the lower class which consists of farmers, workers, and small business men. In order for South Korea to break out of its shell, a balanced growth is necessary.

==== Presidential Inaugural Address: 1998 ====
Meanwhile, The infamous Asian financial crisis set forth in 1997, while the election was taking place. Foreign reserves were diminishing and economic issues such as high cost and low efficiency were threatening South Korea's investors. In his presidential inaugural address in February 1998, Kim Dae-jung addressed the economic standpoint of the country at the time. Kim also emphasized the importance of Korea's agriculture, farming, and foreign investments. Educational reform was highly encouraged and teaching future generations of societal values. He concluded by reflecting upon the thousands of years of heritage and fight for Korea's difficulties thus far.

== See also ==
- Minjung political parties
  - Popular Party (South Korea)
  - Progressive Party (South Korea, 2017)
  - People's Democracy Party (South Korea)
- Minjung theology
- Minjung art
- Undongkwon
- Reality and Utterance
- Baeguiminjok
