= Kim Chi-ha =

South Korean writer (1941–2022)

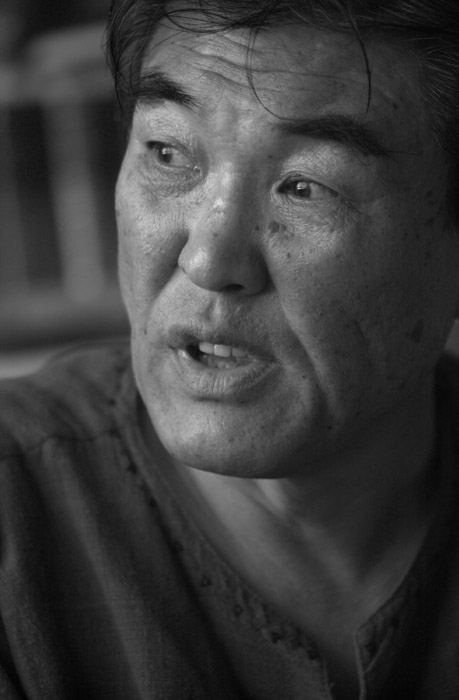
- Kim Chi-ha
- Born: Kim Yeongil; 4 February 1941; Mokpo, Zenranan Province, Korea, Empire of Japan
- Died: 8 May 2022 (aged 81); Wonju
- Occupation: Writer
- Writing career
- Language: Korean
- Period: 1963–2022

Korean name
- Hangul: 김영일
- Hanja: 金英一
- RR: Gim Yeongil
- MR: Kim Yŏngil

Pen name
- Hangul: 김지하
- Hanja: 金芝河
- RR: Gim Jiha
- MR: Kim Chiha

Kim Jiha or Kim Chi-ha (Korean: 김지하; born Kim Yeongil (김영일); 4 February 1941 – 8 May 2022) was a South Korean poet and playwright.

== Biography ==
Kim Jiha was born Kim Yeongil (김영일; 金英一) on 4 February 1941 in Mokpo, Zenranan Province, Korea, Empire of Japan (now South Jeolla Province, South Korea). As a university student, Kim took part in April Revolution demonstrations that toppled the regime of South Korean President Syngman Rhee in April 1960. In March 1963, under the pen name Kim Jiha, he published the poem "Evening Story" (Jeonyeok iyagi) in the journal Mokpo Literature. In 1964, Kim took part in the demonstrations against the normalization treaty establishing diplomatic relations with Japan, for which he was briefly arrested. In 1966, he graduated with a degree in Aesthetics from Seoul National University. He made his official literary debut in 1969.

Kim was a dissident under the Park Chung Hee regime, which began when Park came to power in a coup d’état in May 1961. During this period, Kim took the pen-name Jiha because it is the Korean word for "underground".

Kim first came to widespread attention in May 1970 with his poem Five Bandits, which led to him being arrested under the Anti-Communist Law, though the poem says nothing about either communism or North Korea. The title of Five Bandits is a reference to the "Five Traitors" who signed the treaty turning Korea into a Japanese protectorate in 1905. In Five Bandits, Kim described how about "ten years ago" the eponymous bandits came to dominate South Korea, rapaciously devouring everything as they set out to loot the country. One of the "five bandits" is described as a general who is a great Japanophile and who began his military career fighting for the Japanese in World War II; the character of the general was clearly supposed to be Park, who was often expressed his admiration for Japanese militarism and who like the unnamed general fought for Japan in World War II, which is why the poem was promptly banned and Kim arrested. Sasanggye magazine, in which it was printed, was pulled from circulation and never permitted to publish again.

After accusing the regime of extracting false confessions with the use of torture, he was tried and sentenced to death in 1974, which was commuted to a life sentence and eventual release following a public outcry. When he further accused the government of using torture to get confessions in the 1974 People's Revolutionary Party case, he was once again sent to prison and his life sentence renewed. He was subject to torture himself.

== Personal life ==
As a Catholic, he compared the suffering of the Korean people with the greater suffering of Jesus Christ.

Kim died at his home in Wonju after suffering from an undisclosed illness for a year.

== Work ==
From his first collection, The Yellow Earth, to his collection of lyrical poetry, Looking up at a Starry Field, Kim has displayed a broad literary range including both narrative and lyrical poems, ballads, taeseol, drama, and prose. His works also cover the full gamut of religious thought and philosophy, from the Donghak, to the Catholic, Jeungsan, Avatamska, Zen, and Maitraya tradition.

The majority of Kim's poems also present satirical social critiques. In The Yellow Earth and With a Burning Thirst, the poet offers a scathing invective of society through the medium of lyric poetry. In ballads such as "Five Bandits" (Ojeok) and "Groundless Rumors", he employs a pansori rhythm and occasionally obscure classical Chinese characters to satirize the misdeeds and corruption of those in power. The pansori rhythm is present again in A Rain Cloud in these Days of Drought, a collection of narrative poems that examine the life and death of Choi Jeu. Love Thy Neighbor, when compared to Kim's earlier works, focuses more directly on the notion of romantic love, thus marking a turning point in the poet's thematic focus. Looking up at a Starry Field and The Agony of the Center reflect this shifting thematic interest in their lyrical content and intent in relating the individual's interior monologue. These works also reveal a strong undercurrent of Romanticism, in focusing more deliberately on the poet's desire to connect with nature than on his discontent with society.

In the 1980s Kim's poetry and thought underwent yet another transfiguration. Distancing himself from the struggle of the labor movement then the dominant theme of the era, the poet was able to develop a fresh perspective on life.

In his play The Gold-Crowned Jesus a leper, the most despised outcast class in Korea, encounters the imprisoned Jesus. Jesus tells the leper that he must help liberate Him. By helping the poor, the gold crown of Jesus will be removed and His lips freed to speak.

== Awards and honors ==
- 1975 Lotus Prize for Literature
- 1981 'Grand Poet Prize' at the International Poets' Conference.

== Works in translation ==
- "Aufgehen der Knospe" (German Language)
- Heart's Agony: Selected Poems of Chiha Kim (1998)
- Cry of the People and Other Poems (1974)
- The Middle Hour: Selected Poems (1980)
- The Gold-Crowned Jesus and Other Writings (1978)
- Five Thieves (Thai translation by Jiranant Phitpreecha in 1989)

== Works ==
- The Yellow Earth, With a Burning Thirst, South (Nam)
- Love Thy Neighbor 1-2 (Aerin 1-2)
- Black Mountain, White Room (Geomeun san hayan bang)
- A Rain Cloud in These Days of Drought (I gamun nare bigureum)
- My Mother (Naui eomeoni)
- Looking up at a Starry Field (Byeolbateul ureoreumyeo)
- The Agony of the Center (Jungsimui goeroum)
- Rice (Bap)
- Boat Songs of the South Land (Namnyeokttang baennorae)
- Livelihood (Sallim)
