= Ryu Seong-hie =

South Korean art director (born 1968)

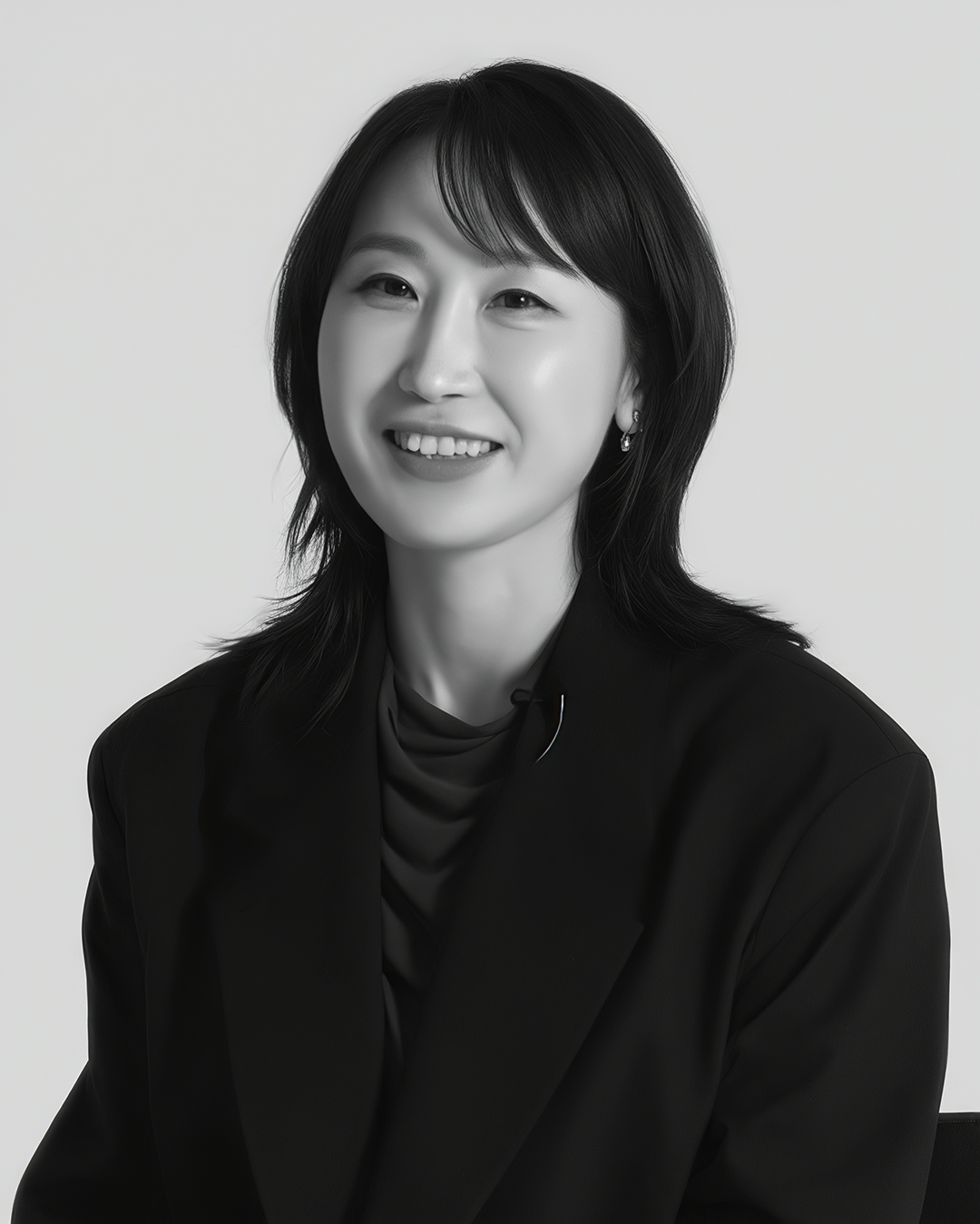
- Ryu in 2024
- Born: November 13, 1968 (age 57); South Korea
- Other names: Seong-hie Ryu; Seonghee Ryu
- Education: Hongik University (Bachelor Degree from Department of Ceramics); Hongik University (Master Degree Graduate School of Fine Arts, Department of Industrial Crafts); American Film Institute (Master's degree in Production Design)
- Occupations: Art Director; Production Designer
- Years active: 2001–present
- Employer: Podo Design Studio
- Agent: Iconic Talent Agency

Korean name
- Hangul: 류성희
- RR: Ryu Seonghui
- MR: Ryu Sŏnghŭi

Birth name
- Hangul: 유성희
- RR: Yu Seonghui
- MR: Yu Sŏnghŭi
- Website: Official Website

Ryu Seong-hie (Korean: 류성희; Hanja: 柳星熙; Born November 13, 1968) is a South Korean film art director or production designer. In 2016, Ryu became the first Korean artist to win the Vulcain Prize for Technical Artistry at the 69th Cannes Film Festival for her work on Park Chan-wook's film The Handmaiden (2017). She has collaborated with Park on several films, including Oldboy (2003), I'm a Cyborg, But That's OK (2006), Thirst (2009), Decision to Leave (2022), and No Other Choice (2025).

Beyond her work with Park, Ryu is recognized for her collaborations with other leading auteurs. These include Bong Joon-ho's Memories of Murder (2003), The Host (2006), and Mother (2009); Kim Jee-woon's A Bittersweet Life (2005); and Ryoo Seung-wan's No Blood No Tears (2002). Ryu's portfolio also includes several of South Korea's highest-grossing films, each surpassing ten million admissions, including Yoon Je-kyoon's Ode to My Father (2014), Choi Dong-hoon's Assassination (2015), and Yang Woo-suk's The Attorney (2013).

Ryu has expanded into television and streaming, winning a Baeksang Arts Award for the series Little Women (2022). Her most recent credits include the Netflix originals Mask Girl (2023) and When Life Gives You Tangerines (2025).

== Early life and education ==
Ryu Seong-hie (born Yoo Seong-hie on November 13, 1968) enrolled in the Department of Ceramic Art at Hongik University in 1987, despite her family's initial discouragement regarding a career in art. She has attributed this decision to the influence of David Lynch's film The Elephant Man. Ryu completed her bachelor's degree in 1991 and subsequently earned a master's degree in Industrial Crafts from the same university.

After graduating, Ryu worked as a sculptor and participated in pottery exhibitions. Citing an interest in narrative and moving images, she decided to pursue art directing. Noting that the role of art director was not yet known within the South Korean film industry, she moved to the United States to pursue further studies. In 1995, Ryu entered the American Film Institute (AFI) through a late admission process. Although she had missed the formal application deadline, she was accepted after submitting a portfolio and filling a vacancy left by a withdrawing student. She has cited the school's status as David Lynch's alma mater as a primary reason for her interest in the program.

During her time in AFI, Ryu was mentored by two prominent production designers. She studied under Robert F. Boyle, known for his work on Alfred Hitchcock films such as North by Northwest (1959), The Birds (1963), and Marnie (1964). Ryu has credited Boyle's emphasis on the collaboration between the art director and the director as a foundational influence on her career. She was also mentored by Henry Bumstead. Bumstead's notable credits include Hitchcock's Vertigo (1958) and Clint Eastwood's Million Dollar Baby (2004).

== Career ==
=== Beginning in the United States ===
After graduating from the American Film Institute in 1998, Ryu began her career in the United States, working primarily on independent projects for approximately 18 months. During this period, she contributed to 20 short and three feature-length films. However, Ryu eventually reconsidered her career path in the US. While constructing a Western bar set for a film, she found that the experience prompted her to question whether she should focus on American films or pursue projects more closely aligned with her own cultural background.

This led her to delve into East Asian cinema, watching films such as Ronny Yu's The Bride with White Hair, Takeshi Kitano's Sonatine, and Lee Myung-se's Nowhere to Hide. Ryu cited Wong Kar-wai's Ashes of Time (1994) as a primary influence; she was particularly impressed by Brigitte Lin's character, noting that it contrasted with Western portrayals of women in cinema. Through this film, she also discovered the work of art director William Chang Suk-ping and cinematographer Christopher Doyle, who would later share the 2000 Vulcan Award for In the Mood for Love. Ryu mentioned that these influences shaped her design approach to focus more on cultural heritage rather than just aesthetics. Seeking to contribute to the developing South Korean film industry, she returned to her home country two weeks later.

=== Returning to South Korea and early works ===
Upon returning to South Korea, Ryu visited several major film studios with a portfolio of short films. She initially struggled to find employment, as studios were hesitant to hire an art director who lacked experience in feature-length domestic productions. To navigate the male-dominated industry, she changed her surname on her resident registration from "Yu" to the more gender-neutral "Ryu." Ryu's first project was for Park Kwang-su's short film, www.whitelover.com. However as a workshop project, Ryu has noted that it did not fully represent her professional standards.

She considered Song Il-gon's Flower Island (2001) as her professional debut. Having admired Song's earlier short films, Liver and Potato (1998) and Picnic (1999), Ryu contacted the director to propose a collaboration shortly after her return to Korea. Although they initially planned to work on a project titled Knife, production shifted to Flower Island, which operated under a limited budget and schedule. To address the film's "adult fable" theme tasked to her by Song, Ryu drew inspiration from Alice in Wonderland. The film's production emphasized the blending of fantasy and reality. Ryu paid close attention to small details rather than elaborate physical sets. One standout design was a bathroom scene where Ryu used patterned wallpaper to convey a worn-out look, juxtaposing the character's current rundown environment with a hint of former grandeur.

=== Collaborations with Ryoo Seung-wan ===
Ryu's first commercial project was Ryoo Seung-wan on the action film No Blood No Tears (2002). The director contacted Ryu after learning of her studies in the United States, and the two collaborated based on a shared interest in Quentin Tarantino's films. The film, starring Jeon Do-yeon and Lee Hye-young, gained attention for its female-driven narrative, a rarity in the Korean film industry at the time.

Ryu handled detailed set design, creating rough sketches and 3D visuals for key locations. She approached the project with practicality, aiming to create tangible environments that could accommodate Ryoo's choreographed action sequences. To establish a harsh, pulp noir atmosphere, featuring a dog fighting ring in Seoul Studio, a lumberyard at Incheon Port with sawdust winds, and an abandoned factory with iron floor. When a logistics warehouse originally selected by Ryoo and producer Kim Sung-je was deemed unsafe, the production moved to an illegal car repair shop. Despite the location's frequent use in other films, Ryu spent four days transforming the space to meet the project's specific aesthetic requirements.

Through Ryoo, she established professional ties with directors Bong Joon-ho, Kim Jee-woon, and Park Chan-wook, which marked the beginning a series of long-term collaborations with the era's leading filmmakers.

=== Collaborations with Bong Joon-ho ===
Ryu's collaboration with Bong Joon-ho began with Memories of Murder (2003), a film based on the Hwaseong serial murder case. With the specific intent of addressing technical inconsistencies common in Korean cinema at the time, particularly regarding lighting and tonal coherence, Ryu decided to join. Ryu believed that by elevating these formal elements and emphasizing local textures, the film could achieve a standard suitable for global recognition.

To capture the 1980s setting, Bong provided Ryu with documentary photographs for reference. Rather than relying on a single location, Ryu reconstructed the film's era-specific spaces by compositing elements from across the country. Although Bong initially wanted to use real police stations, Ryu argued that a constructed set would provide more control over the action and flow. A set was ultimately used, allowing the police station to be designed to create the feeling of depth, specifically an underground interrogation room resembling a deep well. This location served as the setting for one of the film's most memorable scenes, where Song Kang-ho's character and the suspect shared Jajangmyeon.

On this set, Bong earned the nickname "Bong-tail," a combination of his name and the word "detail." The nickname reflected a mix of awe and resentment among the crew. Ryu noted that Bong went to great lengths for accuracy, such as insisting on making a middle school girl's bandage less adhesive. While Ryu initially felt resentment toward these demands, she eventually expressed being moved by his commitment, stating it reflected the "heart of a miner searching together" rather than just careless prop placement.

In December 2003, Ryu rejoined Bong for his third feature, The Host (2006). This epic monster film features an ensemble cast including Song Kang-ho, Byun Hee-bong, Park Hae-il, Bae Doona and Go Ah-sung, and follows a man attempting to rescue his daughter from a monstrous creature. The concept originated from Bong's childhood fantasy of a monster climbing Jamsil Bridge, along with inspiration from the 2000 Albert McFarland scandal involving the illegal disposal of formaldehyde into the Han River. Bong collaborated with Ha Joon-won and Baek Chul-hyun on the script.

With a budget of ₩11.8 billion (US$11 million), the production treated the creature as a central character. This focus led Ryu to recommend her junior, Jang Hee-cheol, as the creature designer. Together, they collaborated closely with the New Zealand animation company Wētā Workshop and the American visual effects studio The Orphanage.

Ryu described the setting as a "shabby environment" reminiscent of the Gangbuk district in the 1990s, a look further enhanced by visual effects. Although primarily filmed near the Han River, the production team intentionally altered the positions of the bridges to create a sense of "familiarity and unfamiliarity." Because of the river's flat landscape, the filmmakers emphasized verticality using a 1.85:1 aspect ratio. This verticality became a cornerstone of the film's visual language, featured prominently in the prologue and the subterranean design of the creature's nest beneath the Wonhyo Bridge.

"It wasn't because I wanted to have a lot of filming locations, but it happened because I was looking for an image of the space I wanted. As I searched for locations suitable for outstanding actors like Kim Hye-ja and Won Bin, the number of filming locations naturally increased."

— Director Bong Joon-ho

Following projects with Kim Jee-woon and Yim Pil-sung, as well as multiple collaborations with Park Chan-wook, Ryu reunited with Bong for Mother (2009). This production marked her first collaboration with cinematographer Hong Kyung-pyo. Bong's vision for the film prioritized authentic outdoor spaces over artificial sets. His directive were to find sites that allowed for the creation of a village where a local town blended seamlessly with a rural landscape while maintaining a cohesive emotional atmosphere. To achieve this, eight location-hunting teams spent over 150 days traveling across South Korea. They covered 80,000 km and took 40,000 pictures, visiting regions including Yeosan, Yeosu, Paju, Gyeongju, Jecheon, and Goseong.

Bong personally developed the storyboards in his signature comic-like style to ensure precise execution of every scene. Ryu noted that this meticulous planning extended to the physical geometry of every set; for one staircase scene, she and Bong engaged in extensive discussions over whether the stairs should be set at a 30-degree or 45-degree angle. Rather than relying on a standard prop or set piece, Bong insisted on traveling to Gunsan to install a specific, real wall for a scene involving a urinal. These experiences confirmed to Ryu that Bong operates with a highly specific "internal order and language" that dictates every visual element of his films.

=== Partnership with Park Chan-wook ===
==== Early collaborations: Oldboy ====
During the production of Memories of Murder, Ryu was invited by director Park Chan-wook to work on Oldboy (2003) an adaptation of the Japanese manga of the same name. The film follows the story of Oh Dae-su (Choi Min-sik), who is imprisoned for 15 years and seeks revenge against his captor Lee Woo-jin (Yoo Ji-tae). Along the way, he becomes romantically involved with a sushi chef, Mi-do (Kang Hye-jung).

The production also marked Ryu's first collaboration with cinematographer Chung Chung-hoon and costume director Cho Sang-kyung. This project was a significant departure from her previous work, as she was less familiar with Park's stylized genre approach. However, she believed that the contrast between her background and Park's vision would produce a distinct aesthetic.

Ryu's sets were designed to blur the boundaries between reality and fantasy. For the prison cell, the script originally called for a clown picture, but Ryu felt it did not align with her artistic vision. Instead, she proposed using a reproduction of the painting The Man of Sorrows painting, which depicts a bloodied Christ with an expression that can be interpreted as either a smile or a look of intense pain. To complement the image, she included a quote from Ella Wheeler Wilcox's poem "Solitude": "Laugh and the world laughs with you. Weep and you weep alone." This change effectively turned the cell into a physical representation of the character's inner psychological turmoil.

The film's visual identity relies heavily on geometric patterns. Ryu designed patterns that transition from the wallpaper in Oh Dae-su's cell to Mi-do's dress and gift box, and eventually appearing in Lee Woo-jin's penthouse. Inspired by a script description of the penthouse as a "minimal space with frequently seen patterns," Ryu used these visuals to symbolize Oh Dae-su's lack of agency and Lee Woo-jin's obsessive control. As the narrative progresses, these patterns become bolder and the colors more saturated to mirror the characters' escalating psychological states.

Designing the penthouse for the antagonist Lee Woo-jin required navigating significant budget constraints. Director Park originally envisioned an indoor-outdoor infinity swimming pool facing a floor-to-ceiling glass window that would make the character appear as if he were floating in the night sky. When this became unfeasible, Ryu proposed incorporating a waterway into the space. Park embraced the idea, even redrawing his storyboards to integrate the element into the film, including a scene where Woo-jin washes his hands in the waterway. This design was praised for its sophisticated appearance and its ability to elevate the film's aesthetic.

==== Subsequent collaboration with Three... Extremes: Cut, I'm a Cyborg, But That's OK, and Thirst ====
Ryu collaborated with Park again for the omnibus film Three... Extremes (2004), specifically for the segment titled "Cut." The short film stars Lee Byung-hun as a director who is forced into a violent game by an extra on the set of a vampire movie. This project saw Ryu working alongside Park's frequent creative partners, including cinematographer Chung Chung-hoon and costume designer Cho Sang-kyung. Ryu later noted that had her schedules for A Bittersweet Life and The Host not conflicted, she would have also served as the art director for Lady Vengeance (2005).

"Like Park's other films, Cyborg is a visual feast. Ryu Seong-hie's art direction is even more explosive than it was in Oldboy. Cyborg has a delightful anime-influenced pop surrealism, with textiles so vibrant they make the eye wander to catch all the little bits of enchantment in the set decoration. The design lifts and extends Park's quirky mood, so that the quirks feel logic within the world he has created, making it feel rounded and full of depth."

— B.L. Panther, Filmmaker of the Month, The Spool

In 2006, Ryu and Park teamed up for the romantic comedy I'm a Cyborg, But That's OK. Set primarily within a psychiatric institution, the film follows Young-goon (Im Soo-jung), a female patient who believes she is a cyborg, and Il-soon (Rain), a male patient who believes he can steal the souls and traits of others. For this project, Ryu wanted to avoid the prejudiced or didactic portrayals often associated with mental hospitals in cinema. She utilized a white base color for the sets, accented by pastel shades of pale pink, green, and blue to create an atmosphere that was both "pure" and "unsettling." This production was also notable for being the first Korean production to use the Viper FilmStream High-Definition Camera, previously used in Miami Vice.

After working with other directors for a few years, Ryu teamed up again with Park in vampire film Thirst (2009), which loosely based on Émile Zola's novel Thérèse Raquin. Thrist was part of Park's exploration of the vampire genre, following his short film "Cut" from the omnibus film Three... Extremes in 2004. It also marks the reunion of director Park and actor Song Kang-ho since Sympathy for Mr. Vengeance (2002).

Ryu collaborated with several of Park's long-time associates: music director Jo Yeong-wook, cinematographer Chung Chung-hoon, costume designer Cho Sang-kyung, lighting director Park Hyun-won, and editors Kim Sang-beom and Kim Jae-beom. The visual design incorporates the motif of "germs" to mirror the destructive relationship between the priest-turned-vampire Sang-hyeon (Song Kang-ho) and Tae-ju (Kim Ok-vin). This concept is explicitly voiced by Tae-ju, who refers to Sang-hyeon as a "germ" even as their lives become inextricably linked. Ryu extended this biological theme to the set design, most notably through the use of sphagnum moss in the lake where Tae-ju's husband, Kang-woo (Shin Ha-kyun), is drowned. The moss serves as a visual marker of decay and infection, reinforcing the film's central metaphors of moral and physical rot.

Ryu also merged traditional Korean elements with oppressive Western religious aesthetics to create a sense of cultural displacement. She designed "The Happy Bok House," the residence of Mrs. Ra (Kim Hae-sook), as a hanbok shop featuring grand Baroque spaces contained within a Japanese-style colonial structure. This eclectic space, complete with vodka, mahjong tables, and trot music, was intended to feel intentionally disharmonious, to fuel the characters' sense of frustration. Director Park developed a particular fondness for the wallpaper Ryu designed for the house, which was inspired by the paintings of French symbolist Odilon Redon.

==== International acclaim: The Handmaiden ====
Ryu regards The Handmaiden as the pinnacle of her collaboration with Park Chan-wook. She also attributes the project's success to a good rapport with a seasoned creative team, including writer Jeong Seo-kyeong, cinematographer Chung Chung-hoon, and costume director Jo Sang-gyeong. Reflecting on the production, Ryu described the experience as a source of "tremendous happiness." For her work on The Handmaiden, Ryu became the first Korean artist to win the Vulcain Prize for Technical Artistry at the 69th Cannes Film Festival. Claude Lelouch presented Ryu with the award on December 2, 2016, at Pathé Les Fauvettes in Paris. Initially slated for November, the ceremony was rescheduled to December to align with Ryu's availability.

"Often, people refer to filmmaking as the director's art. Or they may mention the screenwriter or the actors, as if they are the artists who dominate or possess this genre. However, we, as filmmakers, must be able to perceive more than what is immediately before us. It is through the collaboration of film technicians that a work comes to life, and the director's creativity can be realized in reality. It should not be forgotten that this art is a culmination of individual skills combined intensively. I am delighted to present this award to Director Ryu Seong-hie, who has brought us such an astonishing film today. Ryu Seong-hie's achievement demonstrates that a film of such artistic excellence is accomplished through the presence of a production designer."

— Director Claude Lelouch

Loosely based on Sarah Waters' novel Fingersmith, the film relocates the setting to 1930s colonial period in Korea. The narrative is structured in three parts: the first follows Nam Sook-hee, a pickpocket recruited by a swindler posing as Count Fujiwara to defraud the heiress Hideko. Subsequent segments reframe the story through Hideko's perspective, revealing the traumatic upbringing she endured under her uncle, Kouzuki. The final part concludes the story by resolving the intricate layers of deception with a series of narrative twists.

The production design prioritized cinematic photography over aesthetic. Ryu moved past standard archetypes by using architectural study to build a new visual vocabulary. The Kouzuki mansion is the center of this work; its mix of Japanese, Korean, and European styles serves as a symbol for the complex cultural landscape of the 1930s colonial period. Within this space, the study was designed to feel both dignified and "grotesque," reflecting the characters' darker impulses. By using a restrained color palette and an indoor Japanese garden, Ryu kept the visual emphasis on the characters' costumes, while the inclusion of Shunga served as a symbol on the characters' hidden desires.

We also studied the art of Shunga diligently. There are all kinds of Shunga out there. At first, there were many explicit depictions of intimate moments between men and women in the paintings, so the art team couldn't even look at each other. Later on, we would playfully say, "Hey, this pose is something!"

— Ryu Seong-hui, 2016 Biz Entertainment Interview

Ryu's goal was to establish a visual contrast between Kouzuki's oppressive domain and the refined, secluded world of the heiress, Hideko. Lacking direct historical references for such a space, Ryu turned to Western period cinema for inspiration. She drew from the mise-en-scène of adaptations of Jane Austen's novels, such as Pride and Prejudice, as well as stylistically bold films like Orlando, Atonement, and the disturbing aesthetics of Salò, or the 120 Days of Sodom. This eclectic mix allowed her to maintain a sense of onscreen dignity even during film's more disturbing events.

Hideko's parlor serves as a space of surveillance, centered around a hidden peephole in the sliding door. The decor reinforces the story's sexual subtext through William Morris-style wallpaper that, upon closer inspection, reveals organic shapes evocative of female genitalia. Conversely, the bedroom was envisioned as a calm sanctuary. Featuring cool-toned linens and a curtained headboard, the room was furnished with cushions and a small sofa to facilitate fluid character movement. The space was scaled to appear larger than its physical footprint to accommodate the expansive field of view provided by anamorphic lenses.

==== Decision to Leave and Life Is But a Dream ====
After a period of collaborating with other filmmakers, Ryu reunited with director Park Chan-wook for Decision to Leave (2022). The narrative follows Jang Hae-jun (Park Hae-il), a married detective whose investigation into a man's death draws him toward the victim's widow, a Chinese immigrant named Song Seo-rae (Tang Wei). Set against a picturesque mountainous backdrop, the film explores the complex emotional connection that forms as Hae-jun begins to view Seo-rae as both a primary suspect and a romantic interest.

Ryu designed Seo-rae's room to mirror her isolation as an immigrant, using wallpaper depicting sea and mountains to evoke a mood of loneliness. Ryu believes that while actors use dialogue, "visual storytelling can capture things that are not directly said." Her objective for the film's aesthetic was to build an environment where the subtext was clear: "These people are actually saying that they love each other."

Ryu received Best Art Direction nominations for Decision to Leave at several major ceremonies, including the Baeksang, Blue Dragon, Buil, and Grand Bell Awards, and won at the 16th Asian Film Awards. From July 28 to November 18, 2022, the film's design was featured in the Korean Film Museum's exhibition Design of the Scene. Ryu also took part in an artist talk there with production designers Han Ah-reum and Cho Hwa-seong.

Ryu continued her collaboration with Park on the short film Life Is But a Dream, a project filmed entirely on an iPhone 13 Pro. Blending supernatural romance with martial arts and musical elements, the plot follows an undertaker (Yoo Hae-jin) who inadvertently awakens a ghost (Park Jeong-min) while attempting to steal a coffin. The story develops as the ghost forms a bond with the spirit of a fallen warrior (Kim Ok-vin) whom the undertaker had been trying to bury.

Ryu used color as a storytelling tool, deliberately shifting the palette to match the film's changing locations and emotional beats. The journey starts in the shadows of a cemetery, moves through the action of a martial arts sequence, and ends in a celestial, dreamlike paradise. Ryu's early focus on restrained blues and sharp silhouettes gradually evolved into a richer, more painterly aesthetic. Specific touches, like the textured wooden screens in the undertaker's home and the use of silhouettes in the swordplay, demonstrate this careful layering. By the time the procession begins, the vivid colors of the gokdu figurines and their flags transform the screen into a celebration of light and movement. Ryu characterized Park as a filmmaker who "always wants to create a new world with new stories."

=== Collaborations with Kim Jee-woon and Yim Pil-sung ===
==== A Bittersweet life ====
Impressed by Ryu's creation in Memories of Murder and Oldboy, Kim Jee-woon invited her to collaborate on the action-noir film A Bittersweet Life (2005). The film follows hitman Sun-woo (Lee Byung-hun) who becomes a target after sparing his boss's cheating lover, Hee-su (Shin Min-a). Ryu trusted director Kim completely during production, ensuring her work aligned with his vision and central themes. She collaborated closely with cinematographer Kim Ji-yong and lighting director Shin Seong-yeol on the project.

"What surprised me was the underground interrogation room in Memories of Murder and the detention room in Old Boy. I was strongly impressed by the noir-like space. It felt like there was a smell coming from the image. They were not simply reproductions, but realistic cinematic spaces with atmosphere."

— Director Kim Jee-woon, Cine21

Kim's directive was for Ryu to develop a comprehensive spatial language rather than focusing solely on set decoration. The primary technical challenge was achieving a high-contrast noir aesthetic with three-dimensional depth. Recognizing that lighting alone could not produce the desired "pulp noir" tone, Ryu integrated light-reflective surfaces and specific textures into the sets. This made the physical architecture essential to the way light and shadow were captured on film.

A pivotal setting in the film is the "Sky Lounge," where the story both begins and reaches its violent climax. To evoke the "fateful" atmosphere Kim requested, Ryu drew inspiration from fashion show stage photography, implementing a bold red color palette throughout the space. This was contrasted by the home of the female protagonist, Hee-su, which functioned as a "cinematic oasis." Unlike the harsh, masculine environments found elsewhere in the film, Hee-su's residence was designed to balance light and darkness harmoniously, incorporating feminine elements that provided a reprieve from the oppressive atmosphere of the criminal underworld.

==== Hansel and Gretel ====
Following the completion of I'm a Cyborg, But That's OK (2006), Ryu collaborated with director Yim Pil-sung on the dark fantasy horror film Hansel and Gretel (2007). Loosely inspired by the Grimm Brothers' fairy tale of the same name, the film centers on a group of mysterious children living in a house in the woods and the adults who become trapped in their world. Ryu was tasked with constructing a fantasy space that reflected a child's imagination while maintaining an underlying sense of dread.

The film visual identity centers on the concept of "winter fantasy horror," anchored by an elegant, candy-colored house interior inspired by a pastry shop. Ryu personally designed and produced custom wallpaper for every room, featuring a primary motif of rabbits. These were rendered in a dark, whimsical style reminiscent of illustrator Maurice Sendak. This choice established an uncanny atmosphere by blending childhood innocence with the film's more grotesque and unsettling narrative themes. For the scene where Santa Claus brings drawings to life, she used real sketches from children as her guide. She used bright colors and soft filters to make the images feel magical and warm, similar to the early Harry Potter films, instead of making them look scary. Ryu felt it was vital to keep this holiday charm, even in a horror film, so the audience wouldn't be pushed away by the darker parts of the story too soon.

=== Melodrama, big-budget period dramas and historical epics ===
==== Late Autumn ====
After taking nearly a year-long break, Ryu took on the role of art director for Kim Tae-yong's film Late Autumn. The film features Tang Wei as Anna, a prisoner granted a 72-hour parole to visit her family in Seattle. During her visit, she befriends a South Korean fugitive portrayed by Hyun Bin. Late Autumn is a co-production involving South Korea, China, and the United States, and it serves as the fourth adaptation of the now-lost 1966 Lee Man-hee melodrama of the same title.

Ryu decided to work on Late Autumn after stepping back from films she felt were overly artistic. She found the experience of working on the film to be positive. Shot in Seattle, she also took on the role of location manager. With many scenes filmed outdoors, the project presented a different approach to production design that she enjoyed. Her work on Late Autumn is considered a significant milestone in her career.

==== The Front Line ====
Ryu and Cinematographer Kim Woo-hyung, who previously collaborated on the melodrama Late Autumn, teamed up again for Jang Hoon's war film The Front Line (2011). This marked Ryu's first collaboration with Director Jang. The film, also known as "Battle of Highlands," is set during the 1953 ceasefire of the Korean War and delves into lesser-known aspects of the conflict. It focuses on Aerok Hill, a small rise on the Eastern Front that saw 30 exchanges of control over 18 months of intense fighting.

Ryu initially had reservations about taking on horror or war films, fearing that the production would be filled with disturbing thoughts. However, she was moved to tears upon seeing real aerial photographs depicting the aftermath of war on Aerok Hill, which convinced her to accept the offer.

"The terrain shown in the file photo did not exhibit a clear traffic pattern like those in foreign war movies. After enduring numerous battles on one hill, it appeared as though the ground had been beaten and tangled countless times. Compared to urban battles, this image strongly suggests the essence of war. While conceptualizing, I envisioned the terrain as akin to a grandmother's palm, alongside the hellish scenes that unfolded there."

The Front Line strives to harmonize two contrasting perspectives: depicting the harsh reality of artillery shell destruction and exploring themes of post-war reflection. For the Aerok Hill Battle scene, Ryu and the team initially planned to film in Jeonju but ultimately chose the foot of Baegam Mountain in Hamyang, South Gyeongsang Province. A forest fire in April 2009 unintentionally altered the landscape to resemble the war-torn highlands. The damaged trees rendered the land barren and desolate, mirroring the highlands during the Korean War, which experienced heavy grenade and artillery attacks. Ryu aimed to evoke a sense of sublimity and tragedy by drawing inspiration from the mountain's contours. The art team faced challenges distinct from traditional set building, opting to sculpt the land itself and work with difficult terrain while acknowledging its inherent beauty. Despite the harsh conditions, they reshaped the soil to create the desired landscapes.

==== The Attorney ====
In 2013, Ryu served as the production designer for The Attorney, the directorial debut of Yang Woo-suk. The film was inspired by the real-life "Burim case" (1981) during the authoritarian Chun Doo-hwan regime, following the transformation of a tax lawyer (played by Song Kang-ho) through a series of intense trials. Ryu led a production team that included Kwon Kwon-jin and costume designer Lim Seung-hee, working in close coordination with cinematographer Lee Tae-yoon and lighting director Oh Seung-cheol to capture the film's grounded, historical atmosphere.

The production design team conducted extensive research to accurately recreate the daily lives of Busan citizens in the 1980s. Every element, from large-scale set pieces to minor props, was selected to evoke a sense of period-specific nostalgia. A notable example of this meticulousness is the inclusion of a pineapple fruit basket gifted by the protagonist; the homeowner's delight underscores the fruit's status as a rare luxury item during that decade. The art direction further emphasized early 1980s fashion, utilizing tailored suits with wide collars, bell-bottom trousers, and era-appropriate hairstyles to ground the characters in a believable reality.

To recreate the cityscape of 1980s Busan, filming took place across several cities, including Busan, Gunsan, Daejeon, Jeonju, and Incheon. Ryu's team decorated these locations by installing period-accurate billboards and signages, campaign posters, and calendars, prominently featured Chinese characters, reflecting the linguistic norms of the era. The team also sourced authentic vintage vehicles for street scenes. This commitment to historical accuracy contributed to the film's commercial success. The Attorney sold over 11 million tickets, becoming the second highest-grossing Korean film of 2013 and ranking 15 among the best-selling Korean film of all time.

==== Ode to My Father ====
Ryu's first collaboration with director Yoon Je-kyoon was on the high-profile 2014 film Ode to My Father. Given Yoon's track record of films attracting over 10 million viewers and the project's significant production costs, Ryu noted experiencing immense pressure. Adding to the challenge was the film's vast historical scope, covering the 1950s Korean War, the 1980s, and the present day, which demanded extensive preparation. Yet, the team had to accomplish this within a tight schedule of only three and a half months.

Recreating Busan's culturally vital Gukje Market posed a major challenge, as a previous fire incident had destroyed the majority of the site's historical documentation. After a month of research, Ryu found ample material on elements like the German mines but only a single photo of the market itself. Given its importance, imagination wasn't an option. Fortunately, a late-stage discovery of old photos from a Busan resident provided crucial visual references. These photos enabled meticulously designed sets to accurately portray the market's architectural and commercial evolution from the 1950s onward, showcasing goods from military uniforms and sausages to imported canned goods. Ryu described the discovery as an "unexpected and magical" element of the production.

Director Yoon expressed his satisfaction with the work, praising the technical team, including Ryu, cinematographer Choi Young-hwan, and costume designer Lim Seung-hee, as comparable to "Real Madrid-level talent." For her efforts, Ryu was awarded Best Art Direction at the 36th Blue Dragon Film Awards.

==== The King's Letter ====
"This is a film that must be seen on the big screen. The meticulous artistry by Production Designer Ryu Seong-hie, the deep-color costumes, and the stunning locations create an atmosphere that is hard to believe, especially considering it is the work of a rookie director."

— Director Bong Joon-ho, in an interview at Busan International Film Festival

In 2019, Ryu collaborated with director Jo Chul-hyun on the historical drama The King's Letters. Set during the early Joseon Dynasty, the film explores the collaborative effort between Sejong the Great (Song Kang-ho) and the monk Shinmi (Park Hae-il) to create the Korean alphabet, Hangul.

The film's visual language is built on the contrast between the royal court and the monastic world, representing the ideological differences between the state and Buddhism. Ryu worked closely with cinematographer Kim Tae-kyung to portray the King's spaces with a simple, dignified, and elegant atmosphere, symbolizing the rigid principles of Confucianism. In contrast, the environments associated with Monk Shinmi are presented as open, unadorned, and rustic. To emphasize this distinction, King Sejong's surroundings were largely constructed on studio sets, while Shinmi's scenes were primarily filmed on location to capture raw, natural textures.

To capture King Sejong's refined aesthetic sensibility, Ryu drew inspiration from historical records. The King and his sons, Grand Prince Inpyeong and Grand Prince Suyang, were known for their sophisticated lifestyle. Skilled artisans were hired by the production team to craft historically accurate ceramics for the Gangnyeongjeon Hall, while modern Oriental painter Jeong Jae-eun was tasked with painting the Ilwolobongdo. The furniture in the royal chambers was designed carefully with geometric features to embody the organization and grandeur of the period.

=== Working with Choi Dong-hoon ===
==== Assassination ====
The 2015 period action film Assassination marked the first collaboration between Ryu and director Choi Dong-hoon. Set in 1933 during the Japanese occupation of Korea, the film follows resistance fighters plotting to assassinate a Japanese officer and a pro-Japanese collaborator.

Ryu pointed out that visual records from the 1930s are surprisingly rare in film and television. To bridge this gap, the design team focused on the sharp aesthetic differences between the architectural fusion of Gyeongseong and the bustling streets of Shanghai. The Shanghai Chedun Film Park served as the filming location for 1930s Shanghai, including the iconic Nanjing Road. The team also built a set for the Mitsukoshi Department Store (now the site of Shinsegae in Myeong-dong), which serves as a symbol of 1930s Gyeongseong. They took great care to recreate its opulent atmosphere, even including period-accurate details like a promotional sign for the 1933 film King Kong. The realistic production design of Assassination immersed lead actress Jun Ji-hyun in the era, making her forget she was on a film set.

At that time, Gyeongseong was so wealthy and luxurious that I was surprised when I looked at the historical data, The upper class lived extremely extravagant lives, and at the pinnacle of this opulence was the Mitsukoshi Department Store, which reflected the imperialist cultural policies. It was already magnificent in reality, but the director wanted the space to appear even more splendid. We established the principle of starting truthfully with thorough historical research, but finishing the space in a way that satisfies the audience's fantasy and fits the spectacle of the movie. When you step inside the department store, the space is so overwhelmingly luxurious that you don't even dare to fight back.

— Art director Ryu Seong-hie, Cine21 Interview

Despite initial concerns regarding how audiences would react to the complex blend of Japanese and Western architectural styles, the film was a critical and commercial success. Critics praised the film's innovative artistic techniques, which marked a milestone in South Korean filmmaking. Assassination became a massive box office hit, attracting over 12.7 million viewers and ranking as the seventh highest-grossing Korean film of all time at the time of its release. The Korean Film Museum recognized the project's artistry with a special exhibition titled "Movie Magic Production Design: Assassination in 1930s Gyeongseong." This showcase featured Ryu's original sketches, architectural models, and authentic props, allowing the public to engage with her creative process. Visitors explored recreated environments such as the Mitsukoshi Department Store and the Anemone Cafe, both central to the film's visual narrative.

==== Alienoid part 1 and part 2 ====
After a few years, Ryu reunited with director Choi Dong-hoon for the fantasy period films Alienoid (2022) and Alienoid: Return to the Future (2024). The plot moves to the modern day and then back to fantasy Goryeo period, and outer space. This necessitated two art directors: Ryu and Lee Ha-jun, even though Choi had not initially planned the pairing. He brought Ryu first during pre-production. As the production's scale grew, Lee Ha-jun joined the team. They divided the labor by having Ryu design the historical period settings while Lee managed the modern era.

=== Television and streaming series ===
Ryu and screenwriter Jeong Seo-kyeong developed a strong professional bond while working together on Park Chan-wook's films. Impressed by Ryu's ability to bring believability to fantastical worlds, Jeong approached her for a TV project based on Little Women. The pair decided to move forward with the series while on the set of Decision to Leave. A significant milestone of the production was the assembly of a creative team that was 70% women. This marked a shift in the industry, as women held every key leadership position, including chief producer, writer, director, and art director.

The miniseries Little Woman was widely praised for its meticulous scenography, characterized by lavish set designs and meticulous properties. At the 59th Baeksang Arts Awards, the drama received four nominations, including a Technical Award nomination for Ryu, which she ultimately won. Writer Jeong was also nominated for Best Screenplay, while the drama itself received nominations for Best Director and Best Drama.

The series' architectural spaces blend fairy-tale magic with reality to ground the stylized environments. The design of the blue orchids subtly incorporates human facial features, appearing beautiful from afar but revealing an underlying darkness up close. Individual homes reflect character personalities: Won Sang-ah's residence resembles an ornate theater set, while Park Hye-seok's home uses mother-of-pearl cabinets to create a "modern hipster" aesthetic within a traditional context. Shared visual elements, such as matching wallpaper and blue carpets, provide a narrative thread across these diverse settings.

Ryu also participated in Netflix's original series Mask Girl (2023), where she designed environments that acted as psychological extensions of the characters. She created a stark contrast between Kim Mo-mi's sterile, repetitive office and her surreal, vibrant bedroom used for live broadcasts. Ryu centered her design on the motel where Kim Mo-mi first confronts the grim reality of a murder. She envisioned it as a "faux-romantic" love motel, decorated with palm tree wallpaper that felt like a cheap, unattainable fantasy. The colors shifted from sunset hues to deep night, creating a space that felt both beautiful and heartbreaking. For Mo-mi, this room wasn't just a setting; it was the place where her life changed forever. For the character Joo-nam, Ryu designed a "cave-like" attic with slanted ceilings to represent a world centered on a computer monitor. The prison set was also treated with a fantasy aesthetic, utilizing a unique color palette of purple, lilac, and green.

In November 2023, Ryu mentioned that she was preparing a new drama with director Kim Won-seok of My Mister and writer Lim Sang-choon of When the Camellia Blooms, focusing on a story of three generations of women. Initially has working title "Life," its Korean title, Pokssak sogatsuda (Korean: 폭싹 속았수다), was revealed on January 27, 2023, meaning "thank you for your hard work" in the Jeju language. The English title, When Life Gives You Tangerines, was announced on January 30, 2023, and is a word play on the proverb "When life gives you lemons, make lemonade"; referencing Jeju Island's mandarin orange.

When Life Gives You Tangerines is a period drama that begins in 1960 and spans 65 years of modern Korean history, depicting a family's joys and sorrows. For the series' art direction, Ryu collaborated with main art director Choi Ji-hye. Their approach prioritized expressing the passage of time and the characters' emotions through visual spaces, favoring emotional resonance over strict historical reproduction. While maintaining accuracy, the design also aimed to appear sophisticated from a contemporary perspective, helping younger audiences empathize with the historical setting.

Camellia Award.

== Filmography ==
=== Films ===
Films credit
| Year | Title | | Director | Credited as | | Ref. |
| Year | English | Korean | Director | Art Director Team | Production Designer | Ref. |
|---|---|---|---|---|---|---|
| 2001 | Flower Island | 꽃섬 | Song Il-gon | Yes | No | |
| 2002 | No Blood No Tears | 피도 눈물도 없이 | Ryoo Seung-wan | No | Yes | |
| 2003 | Memories of Murder | 살인의 추억 | Bong Joon-ho | No | Yes | |
| 2003 | Oldboy | 올드보이 | Park Chan-wook | No | Yes | |
| 2005 | A Bittersweet Life | 달콤한 인생 | Kim Jee-woon | No | Yes | |
| 2006 | I'm a Cyborg, But That's OK | 싸이보그지만 괜찮아 | Park Chan-wook | No | Yes | |
| 2006 | The Host | 괴물 | Bong Joon-ho | No | Yes | |
| 2007 | Hansel and Gretel | 헨젤과 그레텔 | Yim Pil-sung | No | Yes | |
| 2009 | Thirst | 박쥐 | Park Chan-wook | No | Yes | |
| 2009 | Mother | 마더 | Bong Joon-ho | No | Yes | |
| 2011 | Late Autumn | 만추 | Kim Tae-yong | No | Yes | |
| 2011 | The Front Line | 고지전 | Jang Hoon | No | Yes | |
| 2013 | The Attorney | 변호인 | Yang Woo-suk | No | Yes | |
| 2014 | Ode to My Father | 국제시장 | Yoon Je-kyoon | No | Yes | |
| 2015 | Assassination | 암살 | Choi Dong-hoon | No | Yes | |
| 2016 | The Handmaiden | 아가씨 | Park Chan-wook | No | Yes | |
| 2019 | The King's Letters | 나랏말싸미 | Cho Chul-hyun | No | Yes | |
| 2022 | Decision to Leave | 헤어질 결심 | Park Chan-wook | No | Yes | |
| 2022 | Alienoid | 외계+인 1부 | Choi Dong-hoon | No | Yes | |
| 2024 | Alienoid: Return to the Future | 외계+인 2부 | Choi Dong-hoon | No | Yes | |
| 2025 | No Other Choice | 어쩔수가없다 | Park Chan-wook | No | Yes | |

=== Short films ===
Short films credit
| Year | Title | | Director | Credited as | | Ref. |
| Year | English | Korean | Director | Art Director Team | Production Designer | Ref. |
|---|---|---|---|---|---|---|
| 1999 | www.whitelover.com | 빤스 벗고 덤벼라 | Park Kwang-su | collaboration (Note: Kim Hui-jeong is the main art director) | —N/a | |
| 2004 | Three... Extremes: Cut | 쓰리, 몬스터 : 컷 | Park Chan-wook | No | Yes | |
| 2022 | Life Is But a Dream | 일장춘몽 | Park Chan-wook | No | Yes | |

=== Television series ===
| Year | Title | | Director | Production Designer | Ref. |
| Year | English | Korean | Director | Production Designer | Ref. |
|---|---|---|---|---|---|
| 2022 | Little Women | 작은 아씨들 | Kim Hee-won | Yes | |
| 2023 | Mask Girl | 마스크걸 | Kim Young-hoon | Yes | |
| 2024 | When Life Gives You Tangerines | 폭싹 속았수다 | Kim Won-seok | Co-designer (Note: Working with Art Director Choi Ji-hye) | |

== Accolades ==
In June 2018, the Academy of Motion Picture Arts and Sciences (AMPAS) extended invitations to its new members, including 14 individuals from the Korean film industry. Ryu was among those invited.

=== Awards and nominations ===
Awards and nominations received by Ryu
| Award | Year | Category | Recipient | Result | Ref. |
|---|---|---|---|---|---|
| Asian Film Awards | 2012 | Best Production Designer | The Front Line | Nominated | |
| Asian Film Awards | 2017 | Best Production Designer | The Handmaiden | Won | |
| Asian Film Awards | 2023 | Best Production Designer | Decision to Leave | Won | |
| Apolo Awards | 2016 | Best Production Design | The Handmaiden | Won | |
| Baeksang Arts Awards | 2023 | Technical Award Television | Little Women | Won | |
| Baeksang Arts Awards | 2023 | Technical Award Film | Decision to Leave | Nominated | |
| Blue Dragon Film Awards | 2005 | Best Art Direction | A Bittersweet Life | Nominated | |
| Blue Dragon Film Awards | 2007 | Best Art Direction | I'm a Cyborg, But That's OK | Nominated | |
| Blue Dragon Film Awards | 2009 | Best Art Direction | Thirst | Nominated | |
| Blue Dragon Film Awards | 2011 | Best Art Direction | The Front Line | Won | |
| Blue Dragon Film Awards | 2015 | Best Art Direction | Ode to My Father | Won | |
| Blue Dragon Film Awards | 2015 | Best Art Direction | Assassination | Nominated | |
| Blue Dragon Film Awards | 2016 | Best Art Direction | The Handmaiden | Won | |
| Blue Dragon Film Awards | 2022 | Best Art Direction | Decision to Leave | Nominated | |
| Blue Dragon Film Awards | 2025 | Best Art Direction | No Other Choice | Nominated | |
| Buil Film Awards | 2011 | Best Art Direction | The Front Line | Won | |
| Buil Film Awards | 2015 | Best Art Direction | Assassination | Won | |
| Buil Film Awards | 2016 | Best Art Direction | The Handmaiden | Won | |
| Buil Film Awards | 2022 | Art and Technology | Decision to Leave | Nominated | |
| Busan International Film Festival | 2024 | Camellia Award | Ryu Seong-hie | Honored | |
| Cannes Film Festival | 2016 | Vulcan Award | The Handmaiden | Won | |
| Cine21 Film Awards | 2022 | Series Staff of the Year | Little Women | Won (Note: Tied with Art Director Lee Nae-kyung) | |
| Cine21 Film Awards | 2025 | Series Staff of the Year | When Life Gives You Tangerines (Note: With Choi Ji-hye) | Won | |
| Chunsa Film Art Awards | 2016 | Technical Award | Assassination | Nominated | |
| Chunsa Film Art Awards | 2017 | Technical Award | The Handmaiden | Nominated | |
| Daejeon Special Effects Film Festival - DFX OTT Awards | 2025 | Art Prize (Technical Award - Artwork Category) | When Life Gives You Tangerines (Note: With Choi Ji-hye) | Won | |
| Grand Bell Awards | 2004 | Best Art Direction | Oldboy | Nominated | |
| Grand Bell Awards | 2005 | Best Art Direction | A Bittersweet Life | Nominated | |
| Grand Bell Awards | 2011 | Best Art Direction | Late Autumn (Note: Award shared with Trae King) | Nominated | |
| Grand Bell Awards | 2014 | Best Art Direction | The Attorney | Nominated | |
| Grand Bell Awards | 2015 | Best Art Direction | Ode to My Father | Nominated | |
| Grand Bell Awards | 2015 | Best Art Direction | Assassination | Nominated | |
| Grand Bell Awards | 2015 | Best Art Direction | The King's Letters | Nominated | |
| Grand Bell Awards | 2022 | Best Art Direction | Decision to Leave | Nominated | |
| Grand Bell Awards | 2022 | Best Art Direction | Alienoid (Note: Award shared with Lee Ha-jun) | Won | |
| Korean Association of Film Critics Awards | 2015 | Technical Award | Assassination | Won | |
| Korean Film Awards | 2003 | Best Art Direction | Memories of Murder | Nominated | |
| Korean Film Awards | 2004 | Best Art Direction | Oldboy | Nominated | |
| Korean Film Awards | 2005 | Best Art Direction | A Bittersweet Life | Nominated | |
| Korean Film Awards | 2006 | Best Art Direction | The Host | Nominated | |
| Los Angeles Film Critics Association | 2016 | Best Production Design | The Handmaiden | Won | |
| San Diego Film Critics Society | 2016 | Best Foreign Language Film | The Handmaiden | Nominated | |
| San Francisco Film Critics Circle | 2016 | Best Production Design | The Handmaiden | Won | |
| Seattle Film Critics Society | 2017 | Best Production Design | The Handmaiden | Won | |
| Woman in Film Korea Festival | 2003 | Best Art Direction | Memories of Murder | Nominated | |
| Yumin Awards | 2023 | Culture and Arts Award | Ryu Seong-hie | Won | |
