= The Handmaiden =

2016 South Korean thriller film by Park Chan-Wook

- Theatrical release poster
- Hangul: 아가씨
- RR: Agassi
- MR: Agassi
- Directed by: Park Chan-wook
- Written by: Park Chan-wook; Jeong Seo-kyeong
- Based on: Fingersmith (2002 novel) by Sarah Waters
- Produced by: Park Chan-wook; Syd Lim
- Starring: Kim Min-hee; Kim Tae-ri; Ha Jung-woo; Cho Jin-woong
- Cinematography: Chung Chung-hoon
- Edited by: Kim Jae-bum; Kim Sang-bum
- Music by: Jo Yeong-wook
- Production companies: Moho Film; Yong Film
- Distributed by: CJ Entertainment
- Release dates: 14 May 2016 (Cannes); 1 June 2016 (South Korea)
- Running time: 144 minutes (theatrical cut); 168 minutes (extended cut)
- Country: South Korea
- Languages: Korean; Japanese
- Budget: ₩10 billion; (~$8.8 million)
- Box office: $38.8 million

The Handmaiden (Korean: 아가씨; RR: Agassi; lit. 'Lady') is a 2016 South Korean erotic historical psychological thriller film directed, co-written and co-produced by Park Chan-Wook and starring Kim Min-hee, Kim Tae-ri, Ha Jung-woo and Cho Jin-woong. It is loosely based on the 2002 novel Fingersmith by Welsh author Sarah Waters, with the setting changed from Victorian era Britain to Korea under Japanese rule, where a Korean girl is hired as a handmaiden to a Japanese heiress who lives a secluded life on a countryside estate.

The Handmaiden was selected to compete for the Palme d'Or at the 2016 Cannes Film Festival. It was released in South Korea on 1 June 2016 to widespread critical acclaim for its directing, writing, twists, cinematography, musical score and cast performances, and grossed over US$38 million worldwide. At the 71st British Academy Film Awards, the film won the category of Best Film Not in the English Language. The film has appeared on many lists of the greatest films of the 21st century, and since its release has been regarded as one of Park's finest works.

== Plot ==
=== Part 1 ===
In Japanese-occupied Korea, a con man operating under the sobriquet of "Count Fujiwara" plans to seduce a Japanese heiress named Hideko Izumi, then marry her and commit her to an asylum to steal her inheritance. He hires a pickpocket named Sook-hee to become Hideko's maid and encourage Hideko to marry him.

Hideko lives with her Uncle Kouzuki, a Korean man who helped the Japanese take over his country in exchange for a gold mine. Kouzuki then uses this wealth to feed his obsession with rare books, selling forgeries to accumulate further money and books. Sook-hee's main job is to help Hideko prepare to read for Kouzuki's guests. Returning frustrated from a reading, Hideko tells Sook-hee to sleep next to her. The two end up having sex under the pretext of preparing Hideko for her married life with the Count. Sook-hee begins expressing reluctance about the plan, but when Hideko suggests she loves someone other than the Count, Sook-hee insists on the marriage. Hideko slaps her and violently throws her out of the room.

When Kouzuki leaves on business for a week, Hideko and Fujiwara elope, with Sook-hee in tow. After they cash out Hideko's inheritance, it is revealed that Hideko's naïveté was part of the con. She and Fujiwara double-crossed Sook-hee and convinced the asylum that she was the "Countess" to have her committed in Hideko's stead.

=== Part 2 ===
A series of flashbacks show that Hideko's "reading practice" was Kouzuki teaching her to read sadistic pornography since she was five years old. The flashbacks show a regimen of psychological and physical abuse that gradually degrades the sanity of Hideko's aunt, who is eventually found hanging from a tree in the yard, causing Hideko to take over as the reader for the auctions. When Hideko questions the description of hanging in a book she has to read, Kouzuki tells her that he murdered her aunt using torture devices in the basement after she attempted to run away.

In the more recent past, the Count realizes seducing Hideko would be impossible and instead includes her in the plan to elope and then split her inheritance. When Hideko expresses her fear of her uncle, the Count bribes her with a vial of opium with which to commit suicide so that she can never be taken to the basement alive, calling it a "wedding present". Hideko demands the Count find her a girl to hire as a maid, to commit to an asylum in Hideko's place.

While being instructed by the Count, who takes advantage of Sook-hee's illiteracy, Hideko unexpectedly falls in love with her. Hideko tries to confess her love, but when Sook-hee insists the marriage go forward, Hideko throws her out of the bedroom and then tries to hang herself. Sook-hee saves her, and both admit to their plots. Hideko helps Sook-hee write a letter to her family to say she has teamed up with Hideko, asking for their help in carrying out a plot to get Hideko and Sook-hee away from the men who have been manipulating them. Hideko shows Sook-hee the books she was forced to read, and Sook-hee begins destroying the library. Hideko calls Sook-hee "her savior" and joins in destroying her uncle's collection.

=== Part 3 ===
After leaving Sook-hee at the asylum, Fujiwara and Hideko eat together at a high-class hotel, where he tells her of his past and asks her to marry him again, this time as Sook-hee, as they have switched identities. He also reveals that Sook-hee will be dead within a few days, causing Hideko to question Fujiwara's desires. Sook-hee's friend Bok-soon sets a fire at the asylum and poses as a firefighter to rescue her. In the pretense of re-creating their wedding night Fujiwara attempts to rape Hideko; however, he is rendered unconscious after drinking wine that Hideko earlier dosed with drops from the opium vial. This allows Hideko to leave with her money. The women reunite and flee together, disguising Hideko as a man to avoid detection.

Kouzuki captures Fujiwara after receiving a letter from Hideko detailing Fujiwara's deception. He tortures Fujiwara in his cellar with his collection of antique bookmaking tools and presses him for sexual details about his niece. Fujiwara makes up a story about making love on their wedding night, while a flashback shows that he watched Hideko masturbate before cutting her hand with a knife to stain her sheets with blood, refusing to consummate the marriage. When Kouzuki presses for more details, Fujiwara convinces him to give him one of his cigarettes, after which he disgustedly refuses to give further details. Kouzuki notices the cigarettes are producing blue smoke, and Fujiwara reveals that his cigarettes are laced with mercury; the toxic gas in the smoke kills them both.

On a ferry to Shanghai, China, Sook-hee and Hideko celebrate their newfound freedom by having sex once again with Ben Wa balls.

== Cast ==
- Kim Min-hee as Izumi Hideko, "Lady"
  - Jo Eun-hyung as young Hideko
- Kim Tae-ri as Nam Sook-hee, "Maid"
- Ha Jung-woo as Count Fujiwara
- Cho Jin-woong as Uncle Kouzuki
- Kim Hae-sook as Madame Sasaki
- Moon So-ri as Hideko's aunt
- Lee Yong-nyeo as Bok-soon
- Lee Dong-hwi as Goo-gai
- Rina Takagi as Hideko's mother
- Han Hannah as Junko
- Katsuhiro Nagano as Monk
- Lee Ji-ha as Ryokan owner
- Jeong Ha-dam as Housemaid
- Choi Byung-mo as Audience member

== Production ==
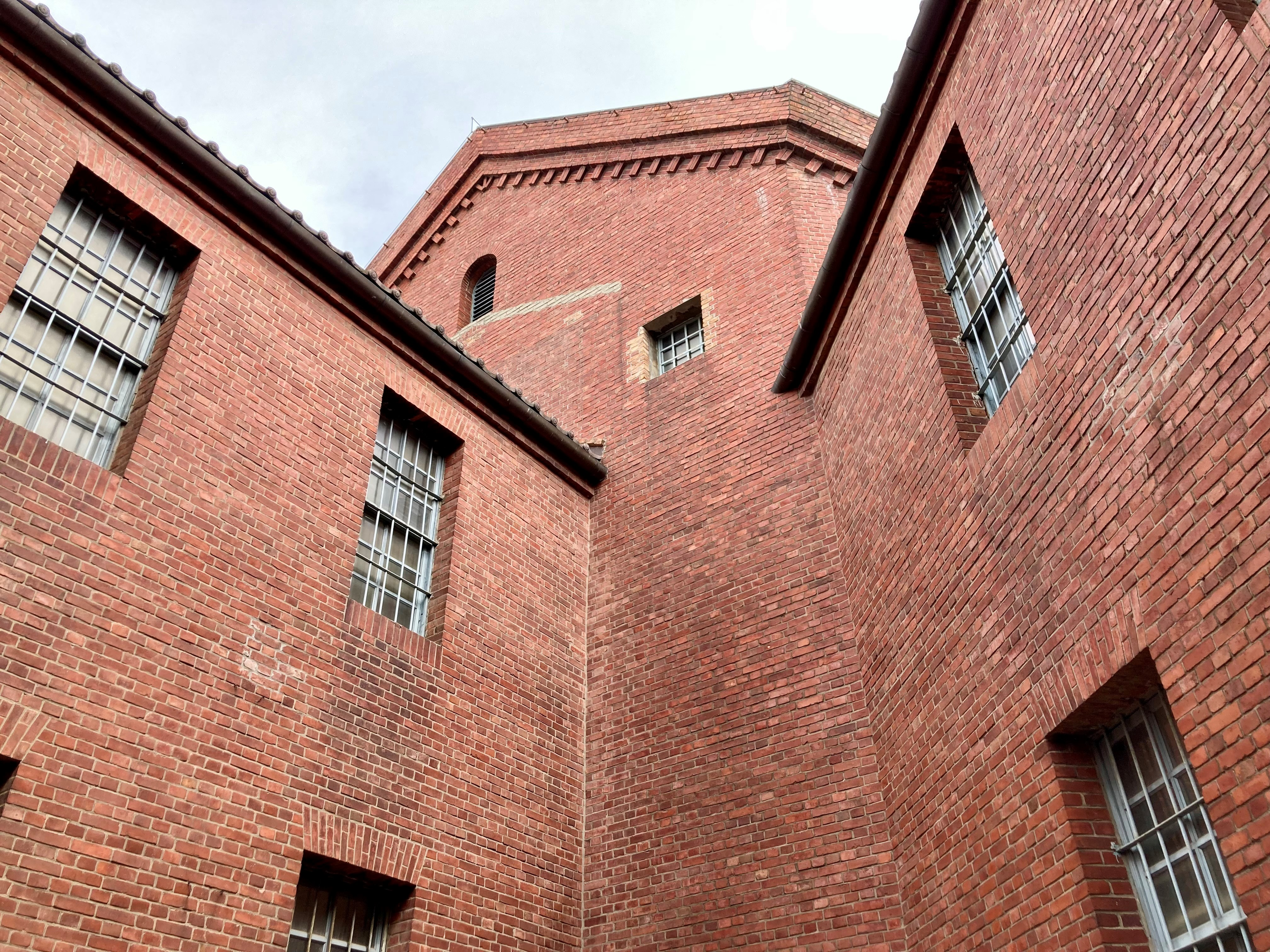
Seodaemun Prison is featured in the film as a psychiatric hospital

In December 2014, it was reported that Kim Min-hee, Kim Tae-ri, Ha Jung-woo and Cho Jin-woong signed on for the film. Kim Tae-ri was selected from 1,500 candidates to play the role. Shooting for the film began in June 2015 and concluded in October 2015.

The print The Dream of the Fisherman's Wife and the book Jin Ping Mei feature in the film.

=== Locations ===
The film was shot in both Japan and Korea. Kouzuki's mansion with combined elements of Japanese and British architecture was filmed in Kuwana in Mie prefecture in Japan, using the exterior of the Moroto Seiroku Mansion and CGI to augment exterior details. Known as Rokkaen (Japanese: 六華苑), it was designed by British architect Josiah Conder and built in 1913. The interior of the library and the staircase leading to Hideko's bedroom were built as interior sets.

The cherry tree from which Hideko's aunt is found hanged was in the gardens of the hospital on the island Sorokdo in Jeolla, South Korea.

== Release ==
In February 2016, CJ Entertainment announced that The Handmaiden was pre-sold to 116 countries, including to Amazon Studios for the US. The film premiered in competition at the 2016 Cannes Film Festival, where it received a standing ovation, and Ryu Seong-hee won the Vulcan Award of the Technical Artist for her art direction work on the film. The film was also screened in the Special Presentations section of the 2016 Toronto International Film Festival, where The Playlist named it as one of the 15 best films of the festival. In South Korea, the film was released on 1 June 2016 and sold more than 4 million tickets.

In the United States, the distribution of the film was handled by Amazon Studios and Magnolia Pictures. The film opened in limited release across five cinemas in New York City and Los Angeles, and played in 140 additional cinemas in the following weeks. Eventually, the film grossed more than US$2 million in the United States theatrically; the film outgrossed Stoker and became the highest-grossing Park Chan-wook-directed film in the United States. It was released on DVD in the US on 24 January 2017 and Blu-ray on 28 March 2017.

In the United Kingdom, the distribution of the film was handled by Amazon Studios and Curzon Artificial Eye. The film grossed more than US$1.8 million in the United Kingdom theatrically, and became the highest-grossing foreign-language film in the UK in 2017.

The original theatrical cut of the film runs 144 minutes. An extended cut, running 168 minutes, was later given a limited theatrical release in the UK and has also been released on home video in some international markets.

In 2026, the film was selected by Chinese actress Fan Bingbing for screening in the section 'Carte Blanche' at the 31st Busan International Film Festival, stating, "The women captured by Director Park Chan-wook's camera are dangerous yet free," adding, "That clarity, boldness, and vitality drew me deeply in.".

=== Home media ===
In the United Kingdom, it was 2017's fifth best-selling foreign language film on home video, and the year's third best-selling Korean film (behind Operation Chromite and Train to Busan).

== Reception ==
=== Critical response ===
The Handmaiden received critical acclaim and was featured on numerous critics' top ten lists. On Rotten Tomatoes, the film has an approval rating of 96%, based on 226 reviews, and an average score of 8.5/10. The site's critical consensus reads, "The Handmaiden uses a Victorian crime novel as the loose inspiration for another visually sumptuous and absorbingly idiosyncratic outing from director Park Chan-wook." On Metacritic, the film holds a weighted average score of 85 out of 100, based on 40 reviews, indicating "universal acclaim". The Economist described the film as a masterpiece. Benjamin Lee of The Guardian ranked it four out of five stars and described it as "a hugely entertaining thriller".

The film's numerous sexually explicit scenes between the two main female characters were criticized by Laura Miller at Slate, who described the scenes as "disappointingly boilerplate" and featuring "visual clichés of pornographic lesbianism, [the actresses'] bodies offered up for the camera's delectation." The New Yorker's Jia Tolentino said that "the women know what they look like, it seems—they are consciously performing for each other—and Park is deft at extracting the particular sense of silly freedom that can be found in enacting a sexual cliché." Sarah Waters, author of the novel Fingersmith on which The Handmaiden is based, considered the film faithful to the book. Commenting on the film's depiction of sex she argued it turned "it into a spectacle" but believed it was faithful to the novel's portrayal of women appropriating a traditionally male pornographic framework to explore female desire.

=== Accolades ===
Award	Year	Category	Recipient(s)	Result	Ref.
Alliance of Women Film Journalists	2016	Best Non-English-Language Film	Park Chan-wook	Won	
Austin Film Critics Association	2016	Best Film	The Handmaiden	4th Place	
Austin Film Critics Association	2016	Best Director	Park Chan-wook	Nominated	
Austin Film Critics Association	2016	Best Supporting Actress	Kim Min-hee	Nominated	
Austin Film Critics Association	2016	Best Adapted Screenplay	Park Chan-wook; Jeong Seo-kyeong	Nominated	
Austin Film Critics Association	2016	Best Cinematography	Chung Chung-hoon	Nominated	
Austin Film Critics Association	2016	Best Foreign Language Film	The Handmaiden	Won	
Blue Dragon Film Awards	2016	Best Film	The Handmaiden	Nominated	
Blue Dragon Film Awards	2016	Best Director	Park Chan-wook	Nominated	
Blue Dragon Film Awards	2016	Best Actress	Kim Min-hee	Won	
Blue Dragon Film Awards	2016	Best New Actress	Kim Tae-ri	Won	
Blue Dragon Film Awards	2016	Best Cinematography	Chung Chung-hoon	Nominated	
Blue Dragon Film Awards	2016	Best Art Direction	Ryu Seong-hui	Won	
Blue Dragon Film Awards	2016	Best Music	Jo Yeong-wook	Nominated	
Blue Dragon Film Awards	2016	Technical Award	Jo Sang-kyeong (costume design)	Nominated	
Boston Society of Film Critics	2016	Best Cinematography	Chung Chung-hoon	Won	
Boston Society of Film Critics	2016	Best Foreign Language Film	The Handmaiden	Won	
Buil Film Awards	2016	Best Film	The Handmaiden	Nominated	
Buil Film Awards	2016	Best Director	Park Chan-wook	Nominated	
Buil Film Awards	2016	Best Actress	Kim Min-hee	Nominated	
Buil Film Awards	2016	Best New Actress	Kim Tae-ri	Won	
Buil Film Awards	2016	Best Cinematography	Chung Chung-hoon	Nominated	
Buil Film Awards	2016	Best Art Direction	Ryu Seong-hui	Won	
Buil Film Awards	2016	Best Music	Jo Yeong-wook	Nominated	
Buil Film Awards	2016	Buil Readers' Jury Award	Park Chan-wook	Won	
Busan Film Critics Awards	2016	Best New Actress	Kim Tae-ri	Won	
Cannes Film Festival	2016	Palme d'Or	Park Chan-wook	Nominated	
Cannes Film Festival	2016	Queer Palm	Park Chan-wook	Nominated	
Cannes Film Festival	2016	Vulcan Award	Ryu Seong-hui	Won	
Chicago Film Critics Association	2016	Best Film	The Handmaiden	Nominated	
Chicago Film Critics Association	2016	Best Director	Park Chan-wook	Nominated	
Chicago Film Critics Association	2016	Best Adapted Screenplay	Park Chan-wook; Jeong Seo-kyeong	Won	
Chicago Film Critics Association	2016	Best Cinematography	Chung Chung-hoon	Nominated	
Chicago Film Critics Association	2016	Best Foreign Language Film	The Handmaiden	Won	
Chicago Film Critics Association	2016	Best Art Direction	The Handmaiden	Won	
Critics' Choice Awards	2016	Best Foreign Language Film	The Handmaiden	Nominated	
Dallas–Fort Worth Film Critics Association	2016	Best Foreign Language Film	The Handmaiden	Won	
Director's Cut Awards	2016	Best Actress	Kim Min-hee	Won	
Director's Cut Awards	2016	Best New Actress	Kim Tae-ri	Won	
Florida Film Critics Circle	2016	Best Foreign Language Film	The Handmaiden	Runner-up	
Florida Film Critics Circle	2016	Best Cinematography	Chung Chung-hoon	Runner-up	
Korean Association of Film Critics Awards	2016	Top Ten Films of the Year	The Handmaiden	Won	
Korean Association of Film Critics Awards	2016	Best Cinematography	Chung Chung-hoon	Won	
IndieWire Critics Poll	2016	Best Film	The Handmaiden	7th Place	
IndieWire Critics Poll	2016	Best Director	Park Chan-wook	5th Place	
IndieWire Critics Poll	2016	Best Original Score or Soundtrack	The Handmaiden	8th Place	
IndieWire Critics Poll	2016	Best Cinematography	The Handmaiden	4th Place	
IndieWire Critics Poll	2016	Best Editing	The Handmaiden	8th Place	
Los Angeles Film Critics Association	2016	Best Production Design	Ryu Seong-hui	Won	
Los Angeles Film Critics Association	2016	Best Foreign Language Film	The Handmaiden	Won	
Melbourne International Film Festival	2016	Most Popular Feature Film	The Handmaiden	Runner-up	
New York Film Critics Online	2016	Best Foreign Language Film	The Handmaiden	Won	
San Diego Film Critics Society	2016	Best Foreign Language Film	The Handmaiden	Nominated	
San Francisco Film Critics Circle	2016	Best Adapted Screenplay	Park Chan-wook; Jeong Seo-kyeong	Nominated	
San Francisco Film Critics Circle	2016	Best Foreign Language Film	The Handmaiden	Won	
San Francisco Film Critics Circle	2016	Best Production Design	Ryu Seong-hui	Won	
St. Louis Gateway Film Critics Association	2016	Best Production Design	Ryu Seong-hee	Won	
St. Louis Gateway Film Critics Association	2016	Best Foreign Language Film	The Handmaiden	Runner-up	
Toronto Film Critics Association	2016	Best Foreign Language Film	The Handmaiden	Runner-up	
Vancouver Film Critics Circle	2016	Best Foreign Language Film	The Handmaiden	Nominated	
Washington D.C. Area Film Critics Association	2016	Best Foreign Language Film	The Handmaiden	Nominated	
Women Film Critics Circle	2016	Best Foreign Film by or about Women	The Handmaiden	Won	
Apolo Awards	2017	Best Film	The Handmaiden	Nominated	
Apolo Awards	2017	Best Director	Park Chan-wook	Nominated	
Apolo Awards	2017	Best Adapted Screenplay	Park Chan-wook; Jeong Seo-kyeong	Nominated	
Apolo Awards	2017	Best Cinematography	Chung Chung-hoon	Nominated	
Apolo Awards	2017	Best Editing	Kim Jae-bum, Kim Sang-bum	Nominated	
Apolo Awards	2017	Best Production Design	Ryu Seong-hui	Won	
Apolo Awards	2017	Best Sound	Jung Gun, Kim Suk-won	Nominated	
Apolo Awards	2017	Best Song	"The sound of you coming" (임이 오는 소리) (Gain and Minseo)	Won	
Apolo Awards	2017	Best Ensemble Cast	Ha Jung-woo, Kim Min-hee, Cho Jin-woong, Kim Tae-ri, Moon So-ri, Kim Hae-sook	Nominated	
Apolo Awards	2017	Best New Actress	Kim Tae-ri	Won	
Asian Film Awards	2017	Best Supporting Actress	Moon So-ri	Won	
Asian Film Awards	2017	Best Newcomer	Kim Tae-ri	Won	
Asian Film Awards	2017	Best Screenplay	Park Chan-wook; Jeong Seo-kyeong	Nominated	
Asian Film Awards	2017	Best Production Designer	Ryu Seong-hui	Won	
Asian Film Awards	2017	Best Editor	Kim Jae-bum and Kim Sang-bum	Nominated	
Asian Film Awards	2017	Best Costume Designer	Jo Sang-kyeong	Won	
Baeksang Arts Awards	2017	Grand Prize	Park Chan-wook	Won	
Baeksang Arts Awards	2017	Best Film	The Handmaiden	Nominated	
Baeksang Arts Awards	2017	Best Director	Park Chan-wook	Nominated	
Baeksang Arts Awards	2017	Best Actress	Kim Min-hee	Nominated	
Baeksang Arts Awards	2017	Best Supporting Actor	Cho Jin-woong	Nominated	
Baeksang Arts Awards	2017	Best New Actress	Kim Tae-ri	Nominated	
Baeksang Arts Awards	2017	Best Screenplay	Park Chan-wook; Jeong Seo-kyeong	Nominated	
Chunsa Film Art Awards	2017	Best Director	Park Chan-wook	Nominated	
Chunsa Film Art Awards	2017	Best Actress	Kim Min-hee	Nominated	
Chunsa Film Art Awards	2017	Best New Actress	Kim Tae-ri	Nominated	
Chunsa Film Art Awards	2017	Technical Award	Ryu Seong-hui	Nominated	
Chunsa Film Art Awards	2017	Technical Award	Jung Jung Hoon	Nominated	
Dorian Awards	2017	Director of the Year	Park Chan-wook	Nominated	
Dorian Awards	2017	Foreign Language Film of the Year	The Handmaiden	Won	
Dorian Awards	2017	LGBTQ Film of the Year	The Handmaiden	Nominated	
Dorian Awards	2017	Visually Striking Film of the Year	The Handmaiden	Nominated	
Houston Film Critics Society	2017	Best Picture	The Handmaiden	Nominated	
Houston Film Critics Society	2017	Best Foreign Language Film	The Handmaiden	Won	
National Board of Review	2017	Top 5 Foreign Films	The Handmaiden	Won	
National Society of Film Critics	2017	Best Foreign Language Film	The Handmaiden	2nd Place	
Online Film Critics Society	2017	Best Picture	The Handmaiden	Nominated	
Online Film Critics Society	2017	Best Foreign Language Film	The Handmaiden	Won	
Satellite Awards	2017	Best Foreign Language Film	The Handmaiden	Nominated	
Saturn Awards	2017	Best International Film	The Handmaiden	Won	
Saturn Awards	2017	Best Costume Design	Jo Sang-kyeong	Nominated	
Seattle Film Critics Society	2017	Best Picture of the Year	The Handmaiden	Nominated	
Seattle Film Critics Society	2017	Best Foreign Language Film	The Handmaiden	Nominated	
Seattle Film Critics Society	2017	Best Production Design	Ryu Seong-hui	Won	
Seattle Film Critics Society	2017	Best Costume Design	Jo Sang-kyeong	Won	
British Academy Film Awards	2018	Best Film Not in the English Language	Park Chan-wook and Syd Lim	Won	
Empire Awards	2018	Best Thriller	The Handmaiden	Nominated	
London Film Critics Circle Awards	2018	Foreign Language Film of the Year	The Handmaiden	Nominated	

== See also ==
- Fingersmith, BBC mini-series that is also based on the book of the same name
