= Decision to Leave =

2022 film by Park Chan-wook

- Theatrical release poster
- Hangul: 헤어질 결심
- Hanja: 헤어질 決心
- Lit.: Resolution to Break Up
- RR: Heeojil gyeolsim
- MR: Heŏjil kyŏlsim
- Directed by: Park Chan-wook
- Written by: Jeong Seo-kyeong; Park Chan-wook
- Produced by: Park Chan-wook
- Starring: Tang Wei; Park Hae-il
- Cinematography: Kim Ji-yong
- Edited by: Kim Sang-bum
- Music by: Jo Yeong-wook
- Production company: Moho Film
- Distributed by: CJ Entertainment
- Release dates: 23 May 2022 (Cannes); 29 June 2022 (South Korea)
- Running time: 139 minutes
- Country: South Korea
- Languages: Korean; Mandarin
- Budget: ₩13.5 billion
- Box office: $21.7 million

Decision to Leave (Korean: 헤어질 결심; RR: Heeojil gyeolsim; lit. 'Resolution to Break Up') is a 2022 South Korean neo-noir romantic mystery film directed, co-written and produced by Park Chan-wook. The film follows married detective Jang Hae-jun (Park Hae-il), whose investigation of a man's death leads him to the man's widow, Chinese immigrant Song Seo-rae (Tang Wei). Hae-jun's investigation of Seo-rae as a suspect gradually leads him to develop feelings towards her.

In April 2022, Decision to Leave was selected to compete for the Palme d'Or at the 2022 Cannes Film Festival, where Park Chan-wook won Best Director. The film was released theatrically on 29 June 2022 in South Korea. Mubi acquired the distribution rights for several territories, including North America, where it was released theatrically on 14 October 2022. Its streaming premiere began in Mubi on 9 December 2022, where it would later become the company's most streamed film.

Decision to Leave received critical acclaim, being named one of the top five international films of 2022 by the National Board of Review. It was selected as the South Korean entry for Best International Feature Film at the 95th Academy Awards, making the December shortlist. Among the accolades and nominations it received are two BAFTA Award nominations at the 76th British Academy Film Awards, for Best Film Not in the English Language and Best Direction, seven wins from 13 nominations at the 43rd Blue Dragon Film Awards and three wins from seven nominations at the 59th Baeksang Arts Awards.

== Plot ==
Insomniac detective Jang Hae-jun works in Busan and only sees his wife, Jung-an, a nuclear power plant manager residing in Ipo, on weekends. Hae-jun and his partner, Soo-wan, investigate a case involving a retired immigration officer, Ki Do-soo, found dead at the foot of a mountain he often climbed. They interview his much younger wife Song Seo-rae, an emigrant from China who works as a caretaker for seniors. They suspect her because of her lack of displays of grief, a scratch on her hand, bruises on her legs and torso, broken ribs, and a tattoo of Ki's initials resembling the monogram he used to mark his belongings.

Hae-jun conducts further interviews with Seo-rae and conducts nightly stakeouts outside of her apartment building, becoming infatuated with her in the process. Seo-rae observes him outside her building and on one of his other investigations. Seo-rae's Monday client says Seo-rae was with her on the day Ki died, and CCTV footage shows Seo-rae entering and leaving the client's home the day Ki died. Questioned about her background, Seo-rae admits that in China she killed her terminally ill mother with fentanyl pills at her request. Before dying, she told Seo-rae to go to Korea to climb the mountain her Korean grandfather, an independence fighter in Manchuria, had left her. Seo-rae gives Hae-jun letters written by Ki admitting to corrupt business dealings, including a letter sent to a subordinate that Hae-jun interprets as a suicide note. Hae-jun rules the death a suicide, despite Soo-wan's doubts, and informs Seo-rae that she is no longer a suspect.

Seo-rae and Hae-jun go on a date at a Buddhist temple, visit each other's homes, and become close. At his apartment, Seo-rae burns Hae-jun's evidence photos from her husband's case, reasoning that Hae-jun's insomnia is caused by his disturbing cases haunting him. When Hae-jun fills in for a visit to Seo-rae's Monday client, Hae-jun learns that Seo-rae and the client have the same model of cell phone, and that the client has dementia and does not know what day of the week it is. On the client's phone, he sees that the housebound woman apparently walked the distance equivalent to 138 flights of stairs on the day of Ki's death. Hae-jun realizes Seo-rae switched her phone for her client's, snuck out the back window of the house to avoid the CCTV cameras, and climbed the mountain to push Ki off. Confronting Seo-rae in her apartment, he concludes that she also forged the suicide note and, to her consternation, accuses her of getting close to him to destroy his evidence. Hae-jun says Seo-rae has destroyed his pride in his job and that, since meeting her, he has become "shattered"; nevertheless, he has covered up the evidence and instructs her to throw the incriminating phone into the sea before leaving.

Thirteen months later, Hae-jun has moved to Ipo to live with Jung-an after developing depression and more severe insomnia. At a fish market with Jung-an, he encounters Seo-rae with her new husband Im Ho-shin, a business investor. The next day, Ho-shin is found dead in his mansion's swimming pool. Hae-jun takes on the case and is convinced Seo-rae is the culprit. She admits only to draining the pool so that Hae-jun would not be disturbed by the blood. Sa Cheol-seong, a Chinese immigrant, soon confesses to killing Ho-shin for defrauding his late mother of her life savings. Sa denies that Seo-rae played any role and reveals he had installed a tracker on Seo-rae's phone so he could find where Ho-shin lived.

Jung-an learns that Ho-shin had called her the day he died. Hae-jun confronts Seo-rae at the mountain her grandfather left her. She rushes at Hae-jun after he scatters her grandfather and mother's ashes at the edge of the mountain, only to hug him as she did at her apartment. She reveals that she kept the phone with the incriminating evidence from Ki's case, and proposes that he use it to "reinvestigate" her. They kiss passionately. Hae-jun returns home to find that Jung-an, who suspects him of having worked with Seo-rae to murder Ho-shin, is leaving him for her coworker.

The next day, Hae-jun learns from Sa that Seo-rae visited Sa's mother in the hospital on the day that she died. He concludes that Seo-rae slipped Sa's mother the remaining fentanyl pills she had in her possession, knowing Sa would kill Ho-shin as soon as his mother died. Hae-jun tracks Seo-rae's phone via the tracker Sa installed and chases her to a beach. Over the phone, she tells him that Ho-shin discovered a phone recording of Hae-jun telling Seo-rae that he loved her, and that Ho-shin had planned to expose their illicit relationship. Hae-jun does not recall telling Seo-rae that he loved her, though she says she began loving him the moment he stopped loving her. At the beach, he finds her empty car and the cell phone, which contains the recording of his instructions to Seo-rae to destroy the phone with evidence from Ki's case. Further out on the shore, Seo-rae digs a pit in the sand and climbs into it as the tide rises, letting it drown and bury her. Hae-jun arrives at the beach and is unable to find Seo-rae, unaware that she is buried in the sand beneath him. He searches desperately for her and cries in anguish.

== Cast ==
- Tang Wei as Song Seo-rae
- Park Hae-il as Det. Jang Hae-jun
- Lee Jung-hyun as Jung-an
- Go Kyung-pyo as Soo-wan
- Park Yong-woo as Im Ho-shin
- Kim Shin-young as Yeon-su
- Jung Yi-seo as Yoo Mi-ji
- Jung Young-Sook as Granny Hae Dong a.k.a. "Monday granny"
- Yoo Seung-mok as Ki Do-soo
- Park Jeong-min as San-oh
- Seo Hyun-woo as Sa Cheol-seong "Slappy"
- Teo Yoo as Director Lee
- Go Min-si as Shaman
- Lee Hak-joo as Lee Ji-gu
- Jeong Ha-dam as Oh Ga-in
- Choi Dae-hoon as sleep clinic doctor
- Joo In-young as caregiver company director
- Lee Ji-ha as Apartment woman
- Jung So-ri as 'Oppa' PC room part-timer

== Production ==
The film is produced by Moho Film and is financed and distributed by CJ Entertainment. It began principal photography in October 2020.

== Themes ==
=== The Mountains and the Sea ===
Park Chan-wook has said that with Decision to Leave, he "wanted to film a Korean movie." This is clear in that much of the movie is driven by imagery of either the sea or mountains, both very common elements on the Korean peninsula. The imagery is also made explicit by Seo-rae's character when she tells Hae-jun the following line from Confucius: "The wise man admires water, the kind man admires mountains." In Asian philosophy, the mountain symbolizes Confucius and upright virtuousness; meanwhile, water is the symbol of Lao Tzu and Taoism. The two elements, despite complementing each other, are also opposed to each other and unable to come together, like the symbols of Yin and Yang. However, ultimately, the sea has the ability to beat the mountains by eroding them over time. Seo-rae's character is symbolized by the sea. Despite her role in killing four other people (her and Sa's mothers and her two husbands) she is not captured by the detective. Notably, she kills her first husband atop a mountain and her second in a swimming pool. She then ultimately takes her own life at the end in the sea. Hae-jun, meanwhile, is the previously upright character symbolized by the mountains but now shattered. The two locations, Busan and Ipo, are also referenced as a sea and mountainous town, respectively. This imagery has been analyzed and debated online, including by both Korean and Chinese participants in the Korea Deconstructed series.

== Release ==
Decision to Leave was selected to compete for the Palme d'Or at the 2022 Cannes Film Festival to be held from 17 to 28 May 2022. It screened for the first time at the Lumière Grand Theater on 23 May 2022 and was subsequently released theatrically in South Korea on 29 June 2022. According to CJ E&M, the film was sold to 192 countries ahead of its premiere in competition at Cannes.

In April 2022, streaming service Mubi acquired distribution rights to the film in North America, the United Kingdom and Ireland, India, and Turkey, with a theatrical release preceding its streaming debut.

Decision to Leave held its North American premiere at the Toronto International Film Festival in September 2022, and its US premiere at Fantastic Fest Film Festival took place in the same month. It was released theatrically in the United States and United Kingdom on 14 October 2022, and was released in Australia theatrically by Madman Films on 20 October.

Mubi began streaming the film on 9 December 2022, and released it on DVD and Blu-ray on 10 January 2023.

== Reception ==
=== Box office ===
The film was released on 29 June 2022 on 1,374 screens. It opened at first place on Korean box office with 114,592 admissions. On 13 July, after two weeks of release, the film surpassed one million cumulative admissions.

As of 7 January 2023, it is the tenth highest-grossing Korean film of 2022, with a gross of US$15,589,120 and 1,893,954 admissions.

=== Critical response ===
On Rotten Tomatoes, 94% of 239 reviews of the film are positive, with an average rating of 8.30/10. The website's critics consensus reads: "If Decision to Leave isn't quite on the same level as Park Chan-wook's masterpieces, this romantic thriller is still a remarkable achievement by any other metric." Metacritic assigned the film a weighted average score of 85 out of 100 based on 44 critic reviews, indicating "universal acclaim".

David Rooney of The Hollywood Reporter, praising the director Park Chan-wook, wrote: "A world-class artist at the top of his game...all while navigating multilayered plots that continue to deliver surprises right up until the end. It's a luxury to put yourself as a viewer in such capable hands."

Peter Howell of Toronto Star rated the film four out of four, and wrote: "Every frame is like a painting, with hints to character motivation and plot twists."

Rafael Motamayor of Slashfilm rated the film seven out of ten, and wrote: "This [the film] is not as surprising or innovative as director Park's earlier work, but it is still a fascinating and exquisitely directed film about desire, regret, and love."

Luke Goodsell of the Australian Broadcasting Corporation called the film "a testament to Park's undimmed talent...Decision to Leave is one of his best".

Wendy Ide gave it five stars out of five in The Observer, describing it as an "enthralling, serpentine crime drama" that possesses "dangerously handsome cinematography, as precise as it is playful, is full of layers and flipped mirror images.

In June 2025, IndieWire ranked the film at number 10 on its list of "The 100 Best Movies of the 2020s (So Far)." In July 2025, it was one of the films voted for the "Readers' Choice" edition of The New York Times' list of "The 100 Best Movies of the 21st Century," finishing at number 193. That same month, it ranked number 89 on Rolling Stone's list of "The 100 Best Movies of the 21st Century."

This movie scored an average score of 8.73 out of 10 on Cine 21.

=== Accolades ===
Name of the award ceremony, year presented, category, nominee(s) of the award, and the result of the nomination
Award ceremony	Year	Category	Nominee / Work	Result	Ref.
Academy Awards	2023	Best International Feature Film	Decision to Leave	Shortlisted	
Alliance of Women Film Journalists	2023	Best Non-English Language Film	Decision to Leave	Won	
Asia Pacific Screen Awards	2022	Best Screenplay	Park Chan-wook, Jeong Seo-kyeong	Nominated	
Asian Film Awards	2023	Best Film	Decision to Leave	Nominated	
Asian Film Awards	2023	Best Director	Park Chan-wook	Nominated	
Asian Film Awards	2023	Best Actor	Park Hae-il	Nominated	
Asian Film Awards	2023	Best Actress	Tang Wei	Won	
Asian Film Awards	2023	Best Screenplay	Park Chan-wook, Jeong Seo-kyeong	Won	
Asian Film Awards	2023	Best Editing	Kim Sang-bum	Nominated	
Asian Film Awards	2023	Best Cinematography	Kim Ji-yong	Nominated	
Asian Film Awards	2023	Best Music	Jo Yeong-wook	Nominated	
Asian Film Awards	2023	Best Production Design	Ryu Seong-hui	Won	
Asian Film Awards	2023	Best Sound	Kim Suk-won	Nominated	
Asian Journalists Association	2022	AJA Awards	Park Hae-il	Won	
Austin Film Critics Association	2023	Best Director	Park Chan-wook	Nominated	
Austin Film Critics Association	2023	Best International Film	Decision to Leave	Won	
Baeksang Arts Awards	2023	Grand Prize – Film	Decision to Leave	Won	
Baeksang Arts Awards	2023	Best Film	Decision to Leave	Nominated	
Baeksang Arts Awards	2023	Best Director	Park Chan-wook	Won	
Baeksang Arts Awards	2023	Best Actor	Park Hae-il	Nominated	
Baeksang Arts Awards	2023	Best Actress	Tang Wei	Won	
Baeksang Arts Awards	2023	Best Screenplay	Park Chan-wook, Jeong Seo-kyeong	Nominated	
Baeksang Arts Awards	2023	Technical Award	Ryu Seong-hui (Art direction)	Nominated	
Baeksang Arts Awards	2023	Technical Award	Cho Young-wook (Music)	Nominated	
Blue Dragon Film Awards	2022	Best Actor	Park Hae-il	Won	
Blue Dragon Film Awards	2022	Best Actress	Tang Wei	Won	
Blue Dragon Film Awards	2022	Best Director	Park Chan-wook	Won	
Blue Dragon Film Awards	2022	Best Film	Decision to Leave	Won	
Blue Dragon Film Awards	2022	Best Music	Jo Yeong-wook	Won	
Blue Dragon Film Awards	2022	Best Screenplay	Park Chan-wook, Jeong Seo-kyeong	Won	
Blue Dragon Film Awards	2022	Popular Star Award	Go Kyung-pyo	Won	
Blue Dragon Film Awards	2022	Best Art Direction	Ryu Seong-hui	Nominated	
Blue Dragon Film Awards	2022	Best Cinematography and Lighting	Kim Ji-yong, Shin Sang-yeol	Nominated	
Blue Dragon Film Awards	2022	Best Editing	Kim Sang-bum	Nominated	
Blue Dragon Film Awards	2022	Best New Actress	Kim Shin-young	Nominated	
Blue Dragon Film Awards	2022	Best Supporting Actor	Go Kyung-pyo	Nominated	
Blue Dragon Film Awards	2022	Best Supporting Actress	Lee Jung-hyun	Nominated	
Blue Dragon Film Awards	2022	Technical Award	Kwak Jeong-ae	Nominated	
Boston Society of Film Critics	2022	Best Editing	Kim Sang-bum	Won	
British Academy Film Awards	2023	Best Director	Park Chan-wook	Nominated	
British Academy Film Awards	2023	Best Film Not in the English Language	Park Chan-wook, Ko Dae-seok	Nominated	
British Academy Film Awards	2023	Best Original Screenplay	Park Chan-wook, Jeong Seo-kyeong	Longlisted	
British Academy Film Awards	2023	Best Editing	Kim Sang-bum	Longlisted	
British Independent Film Awards	2022	Best International Independent Film	Park Chan-wook, Jeong Seo-kyeong	Nominated	
Buil Film Awards	2022	Best Actor	Park Hae-il	Won	
Buil Film Awards	2022	Best Actress	Tang Wei	Won	
Buil Film Awards	2022	Best Cinematography	Kim Ji-yong	Won	
Buil Film Awards	2022	Best Film	Decision to Leave	Won	
Buil Film Awards	2022	Best Music	Jo Yeong-wook	Won	
Buil Film Awards	2022	Art and Technology	Ryu Seong-hui	Nominated	
Buil Film Awards	2022	Best Director	Park Chan-wook	Nominated	
Buil Film Awards	2022	Best Screenplay	Park Chan-wook, Jeong Seo-kyeong	Nominated	
Busan Film Critics Awards	2022	Best Actor	Park Hae-il	Won	
Cannes Film Festival	2022	Best Director	Park Chan-wook	Won	
Cannes Film Festival	2022	Palme d'Or	Decision to Leave	Nominated	
Chicago Film Critics Association	2022	Best Cinematography	Kim Ji-Yong	Won	
Chicago Film Critics Association	2022	Best Director	Park Chan-wook	Nominated	
Chicago Film Critics Association	2022	Best Best Editing	Kim Sang-bum	Nominated	
Chicago Film Critics Association	2022	Best Film	Decision to Leave	Nominated	
Chicago Film Critics Association	2022	Best Foreign Language Film	Decision to Leave	Won	
Chunsa Film Art Awards	2022	Best Actor	Park Hae-il	Won	
Chunsa Film Art Awards	2022	Best Actress	Tang Wei	Won	
Chunsa Film Art Awards	2022	Best Director	Park Chan-wook	Won	
Chunsa Film Art Awards	2022	Best Screenplay	Park Chan-wook, Jeong Seo-kyeong	Nominated	
Chunsa Film Art Awards	2022	Technical Award	Kim Ji-yong	Nominated	
Cine21 Awards	2022	Actor of the Year	Park Hae-il	Won	
Cine21 Awards	2022	Actress of the Year	Tang Wei	Won	
Critics' Choice Movie Awards	2023	Best Foreign Language Film	Decision to Leave	Nominated	
Critics Choice Awards Asian Pacific Cinema & Television	2022	Director Award	Park Chan-wook	Won	
Dallas–Fort Worth Film Critics Association	2022	Best Foreign Language Film	Decision to Leave	Won	
Director's Cut Awards	2023	Best Director in film	Park Chan-wook	Won	
Director's Cut Awards	2023	Best Screenplay	Park Chan-wook, Jeong Seo-kyeong	Won	
Director's Cut Awards	2023	Best Actress in film	Tang Wei	Won	
Director's Cut Awards	2023	Best Actor in film	Park Hae-il	Won	
Director's Cut Awards	2023	Best New Actor in film	Seo Hyun-woo	Won	
Director's Cut Awards	2023	Best New Actress in film	Kim Shin-young	Nominated	
Dublin Film Critics' Circle	2022	Best Director	Park Chan-wook	8th place	
Dublin Film Critics' Circle	2022	Best Actress	Tang Wei	4th place	
Dublin Film Critics' Circle	2022	Best Screenplay	Park Chan-wook, Jeong Seo-kyeong	4th place	
Florida Film Critics Circle	2022	Best Actor	Park Hae-il	Runner-up	
Florida Film Critics Circle	2022	Best Actress	Tang Wei	Runner-up	
Florida Film Critics Circle	2022	Best Director	Park Chan-wook	Won	
Florida Film Critics Circle	2022	Best Cinematography	Kim Ji-yong	Won	
Florida Film Critics Circle	2022	Best Foreign Language Film	Decision to Leave	Won	
Florida Film Critics Circle	2022	Best Original Screenplay	Park Chan-wook, Jeong Seo-kyeong	Won	
Florida Film Critics Circle	2022	Best Picture	Decision to Leave	Runner-up	
Georgia Film Critics Association	2023	Best Actor	Park Hae-il	Nominated	
Georgia Film Critics Association	2023	Best Actress	Tang Wei	Nominated	
Georgia Film Critics Association	2023	Best Director	Park Chan-wook	Nominated	
Georgia Film Critics Association	2023	Best International Film	Decision to Leave	Runner-Up	
Georgia Film Critics Association	2023	Best Picture	Decision to Leave	Nominated	
Golden Cinematography Awards	2022	Best Director	Park Chan-wook	Won	
Golden Cinematography Awards	2022	Best Actor	Park Hae-il	Won	
Golden Cinematography Awards	2022	Best Actress	Tang Wei	Won	
Golden Globe Awards	2023	Best Motion Picture – Foreign Language	Decision to Leave	Nominated	
Gotham Independent Film Awards	2022	Best International Feature	Decision to Leave	Nominated	
Grand Bell Awards	2022	Best Actor	Park Hae-il	Won	
Grand Bell Awards	2022	Best Film	Decision to Leave	Won	
Grand Bell Awards	2022	Best Screenplay	Park Chan-wook, Jeong Seo-kyeong	Won	
Grand Bell Awards	2022	Best Actress	Tang Wei	Nominated	
Grand Bell Awards	2022	Best Art Direction	Ryu Seong-hui	Nominated	
Grand Bell Awards	2022	Best Cinematography	Kim Ji-young	Nominated	
Grand Bell Awards	2022	Best Costume Design	Kwak Jeong-ae	Nominated	
Grand Bell Awards	2022	Best Director	Park Chan-wook	Nominated	
Grand Bell Awards	2022	Best Film Editing	Kim Sang-bum	Nominated	
Grand Bell Awards	2022	Best Lighting	Shin Sang-yeol	Nominated	
Grand Bell Awards	2022	Best Music	Jo Yeong-wook	Nominated	
Hollywood Critics Association Awards	2023	Best Director	Park Chan-wook	Nominated	
Hollywood Critics Association Awards	2023	Best International Film	Decision to Leave	Nominated	
Hollywood Critics Association Creative Arts Awards	2023	Best Editing	Kim Sang-bum	Nominated	
Houston Film Critics Society	2023	Best Foreign Language Feature	Decision to Leave	Nominated	
Jerusalem Film Festival	2022	Best International Film	Decision to Leave	Nominated	
Korean Association of Film Critics Awards	2022	Best Actress	Tang Wei	Won	
Korean Association of Film Critics Awards	2022	Best Cinematography	Kim Ji-young	Won	
Korean Association of Film Critics Awards	2022	Best Director	Park Chan-wook	Won	
Korean Association of Film Critics Awards	2022	Best Music	Jo Yeong-wook	Won	
Korean Association of Film Critics Awards	2022	Best Picture	Decision to Leave	Won	
Korean Association of Film Critics Awards	2022	Best Screenplay	Park Chan-wook, Jeong Seo-kyeong	Won	
Korean Association of Film Critics Awards	2022	Korean Association of Film 10 selections of Kim Hyun-seung	Decision to Leave	Won	
Korean Film Producers Association Award	2022	Best Film	Decision to Leave	Won	
Korean Film Producers Association Award	2022	Best Screenplay	Park Chan-wook, Jeong Seo-kyeong	Won	
Korean Film Producers Association Award	2022	Best Actress	Tang Wei	Won	
Korean Film Producers Association Award	2022	Best Supporting Actress	Kim Shin-young	Won	
Korean Film Producers Association Award	2022	Best Music and light	Jo Yeong-wook, Shin Sang-yeol	Won	
LACMA Art + Film Gala	2022	Art+Film Gala	Park Chan-wook	Won	
London Film Critics' Circle	2023	Director of the Year	Park Chan-wook	Nominated	
London Film Critics' Circle	2023	Film of the Year	Decision to Leave	Nominated	
London Film Critics' Circle	2023	Foreign Language Film of the Year	Decision to Leave	Won	
London Film Critics' Circle	2023	Technical Achievement Award	Kim Ji-yong	Nominated	
Miskolc International Film Festival	2022	Emeric Pressburger Prize	Decision to Leave	Nominated	
National Board of Review	2022	Top Five Foreign Language Films	Decision to Leave	Won	
National Society of Film Critics	2023	Best Cinematography	Kim Ji-yong	3rd place	
National Society of Film Critics	2023	Best Director	Park Chan-wook	Runner-up	
National Society of Film Critics	2023	Best Foreign Language Film	Decision to Leave	3rd place	
New Mexico Critics Awards	2022	Best Supporting Actress	Tang Wei	Won	
Online Film Critics Society	2023	Best Film Not in the English Language	Decision to Leave	Won	
Oslo Films from the South Festival	2022	Silver Mirror	Decision to Leave	Nominated	
Palm Springs International Film Festival	2023	Best International Feature Film	Decision to Leave	Nominated	
San Diego Film Critics Society	2023	Best International Film	Decision to Leave	Nominated	
San Francisco Bay Area Film Critics Circle	2023	Best International Feature Film	Decision to Leave	Won	
San Francisco Bay Area Film Critics Circle	2023	Best Cinematography	Kim Ji-yong	Nominated	
Satellite Awards	2022	Best Motion Picture – International	Decision to Leave	Nominated	
Seattle Film Critics Society	2023	Best Cinematography	Kim Ji-yong	Nominated	
Seattle Film Critics Society	2023	Best Film Editing	Kim Sang-bum	Nominated	
Seattle Film Critics Society	2023	Best Film Not in the English Language	Decision to Leave	Won	
Seattle Film Critics Society	2023	Best Picture	Decision to Leave	Nominated	
Seattle Film Critics Society	2023	Best Screenplay	Park Chan-wook, Jeong Seo-kyeong	Nominated	
St. Louis Film Critics Association	2022	Best International Film	Decision to Leave	Won	
St. Louis Film Critics Association	2022	Best Original Screenplay	Park Chan-wook, Jeong Seo-kyeong	Nominated	
Sunset Circle Awards	2022	Best Actress	Tang Wei	Nominated	
Sunset Circle Awards	2022	Best Director	Park Chan-wook	Nominated	
Sunset Circle Awards	2022	Best Editing	Kim Sang-bum	Nominated	
Sunset Circle Awards	2022	Best Screenplay	Park Chan-wook, Jeong Seo-kyeong	Nominated	
Sunset Circle Awards	2022	Best Film	Decision to Leave	Nominated	
Sunset Circle Awards	2022	Best International Feature	Decision to Leave	Runner-up	
Toronto Film Critics Association	2023	Best International Feature Film	Decision to Leave	Runner-up	
Valladolid International Film Festival	2022	José Salcedo Award for Best Editing	Kim Sang-bum	Won	
Valladolid International Film Festival	2022	Golden Spike (Best Picture)	Decision to Leave	Nominated	
Washington D.C. Area Film Critics Association	2022	Best International/Foreign Language Film	Decision to Leave	Won	
Women in Film Korea Festival	2022	Best Screenplay	Jeong Seo-kyeong	Won	

=== End-of-year lists ===
Name of publisher, year listed, name of listicle, and placement
Publisher	Year	Listicle	Placement	Ref.
Polygon	2022	The Best Movies of 2022	2nd	
IndieWire	2022	The 25 Best Movies of 2022	5th	
The New York Times	2022	Best Movies of 2022	8th	
The Guardian	2022	Best Movies of 2022 in the US	9th	
The Independent	2022	The Best Films of 2022, Ranked	12th	
Empire	2022	The Best Movies of 2022	17th	
The Hollywood Reporter	2022	Critics Pick the Best Films of 2022	2nd	

== See also ==
- List of submissions to the 95th Academy Awards for Best International Feature Film
- List of South Korean submissions for the Academy Award for Best International Feature Film
