= Chicago Film Critics Association Award for Best Foreign Language Film =

Annual US film award

The Chicago Film Critics Association Awards for Best Foreign Language Film is an annual award given by the Chicago Film Critics Association since 1988. Until at least 1994, it was the award for Best Foreign Film, regardless of the language spoken in the film.

== Winners ==
Year	Winner	Movie	Country
1988	Louis Malle	Au revoir les enfants	France
1989	Kenneth Branagh	Henry V.	United Kingdom
1990	Peter Greenaway	The Cook, the Thief, His Wife & Her Lover	United Kingdom
1991	Jane Campion	An Angel at My Table	Australia/New Zealand
1992	Neil Jordan	The Crying Game	United Kingdom
1993	Jane Campion	The Piano	Australia/New Zealand
1994	Krzysztof Kieślowski	Trois couleurs: Rouge	France/Poland
1995	Michael Radford	Il Postino: The Postman	Italy
1996	Krzysztof Kieślowski	Dekalog	Poland
1997	Masayuki Suo	Shall We Dance?	Japan
1998	Roberto Benigni	La vita è bella	Italy
1999	Pedro Almodóvar	Todo sobre mi madre	Spain
2000	Ang Lee	Crouching Tiger, Hidden Dragon	Taiwan
2001	Jean-Pierre Jeunet	Amélie	France
2002	Alfonso Cuarón	Y Tu Mamá También	Mexico
2003	Fernando Meirelles; Kátia Lund	City of God	Brazil
2004	Jean-Pierre Jeunet	Un long dimanche de fiançailles	France
2005	Michael Haneke	Caché	Austria
2006	Clint Eastwood	Letters from Iwo Jima	United States (Japanese)
2007	Cristian Mungiu	4 Months, 3 Weeks and 2 Days	Romania
2008	Tomas Alfredson	Let the Right One In	Sweden
2009	Michael Haneke	The White Ribbon	Germany
2010	Jacques Audiard	A Prophet	France
2011	Asghar Farhadi	A Separation	Iran
2012	Michael Haneke	Amour	Austria
2013	Joshua Oppenheimer	The Act of Killing	United Kingdom
2014	Ruben Östlund	Force Majeure	Sweden
2015	László Nemes	Son of Saul	Hungary
2016	Park Chan-wook	The Handmaiden	South Korea
2017	Ruben Östlund	The Square	Sweden
2018	Alfonso Cuarón	Roma	Mexico
2019	Bong Joon-ho	Parasite	South Korea
2020	Thomas Vinterberg	Another Round	Denmark
2021	Ryusuke Hamaguchi	Drive My Car	Japan
2022	Park Chan-wook	Decision to Leave	South Korea
2023	Jonathan Glazer	The Zone of Interest	United Kingdom
2024	Payal Kapadia	All We Imagine as Light	France, India, Netherlands, Luxembourg and Italy

== See also ==
- Academy Award for Best International Feature Film
- Golden Globe Award for Best Foreign Language Film
