= Jeong Seo-kyeong =

South Korean television writer (born 1975)

- 정서경
- Born: 1975 (age 50–51); South Korea
- Education: Seoul National University; Korea National University of Arts
- Occupation: Screenwriter
- Years active: 2002–present
- Organization(s): Korea Television and Radio Writers Association (KTRWA)
- Honours: Presidential Commendation

Korean name
- Hangul: 정서경
- RR: Jeong Seogyeong
- MR: Chŏng Sŏgyŏng

Jeong Seo-kyeong (Korean: 정서경; born 1975) is a South Korean screenwriter. In 2002, she debuted as an independent film director and scriptwriter with the short film, Electricians. She is best known for her works with critically acclaimed director Park Chan-wook such as Lady Vengeance (2005), I'm a Cyborg, But That's OK (2006), Thirst (2009), The Handmaiden (2016), and Decision to Leave (2022).

Jeong has received numerous awards and nominations for her screenwriting work both domestically and internationally. Recognitions include accolades from the Asian Film Awards, Baeksang Arts Awards, Blue Dragon Film Awards, the Chicago Film Critics Association, and the Sitges Film Festival. In June 2018, Jeong was among those invited to be a member of the Academy of Motion Picture Arts and Sciences (AMPAS).

== Early life and education ==
Jeong initially aspired to become a nun because she admired their uniforms. She first enrolled in the Philosophy Department at Seoul National University, but later transferred to the Film Department of the Korea National University of Arts to avoid retaking college entrance exams. This decision was motivated by her belief that studying film and acting would provide more professional opportunities. While in film school, Jeong attended a scriptwriting class taught by director Hong Sang-soo. She also joined a film club where she studied the works of auteurs such as Ingmar Bergman, Abel Ferrara, Roman Polanski, and Stanley Kubrick.

During her third year, Jeong wrote the short film The Electricians. It was selected as one of the recipients of the 5th Eastman Short Film Production Support Project (Kodak Short Film Production Support Project). Although she did not originally intend to become a director, changes in the academic curriculum required her to complete a film to graduate. She ultimately earned her degree following the completion of The Electricians.

== Career ==
=== Lady Vengeance ===
In 2002, Park Chan-wook, who was part of the jury for Kodak Short Film Production Support Project, discovered Jeong when she applied for the project's scholarship. At the time, Jeong was in her third year at the Korea National University of Arts. A year later, Park met with Jeong again following the establishment of his production company, Moho Film.

My entire film career can be divided into the period before and after I met Jeong Seo-kyung.

— Park Chan-wook, Preface in Lady Vengeance Screenplay Collection.

During the production of Oldboy (2003), Park felt the narrative sidelined the female character, Mido. This realization, which he further developed after Oldboy won the Grand Prix at the 2004 Cannes Film Festival, inspired him to create a more female-centric project. Seeking a female perspective for the script, Park recalled Jeong's unique sensibility and creative spark and approached her to write an initial draft. Although the two originally met to collaborate on the film Thirst, the project was postponed when Park decided to prioritize the development of Lady Vengeance.

Lady Vengeance ranked as the seventh highest-grossing domestic release in South Korea that year and the eighth highest-grossing release overall with a nationwide ticket sale of 3,650,000. Lady Vengeance also participated in the competition for the Golden Lion at the 62nd Venice International Film Festival in September 2005. Although it did not win in the competition, it received recognition in other categories including the Cinema of The Future, the Young Lion Award, and the Best Innovated Film Award in the non-competition section. It later won the Best Film award at the 26th Blue Dragon Film Awards.

=== I'm a Cyborg, But That's OK ===
I'm a Cyborg, But That's OK, the second film by Park and writer Jeong, presented a fresh challenge for them, as it diverged from their renowned Revenge Trilogy. The film, a romantic comedy, unfolds within the setting of a mental hospital, portraying the unconventional love story between Yeong-gun (acted by Lim Soo-jeong), who believes she is a cyborg, and Il-sun (acted by Jung Ji-hoon), a patient who supports and safeguards her.

It contains the message of loving each other and having hope no matter what the situation. However, it is a work that can be interpreted in various ways.

— Jeong Seo-kyung, interview with Yonhap News

I'm a Cyborg, But That's OK premiered in South Korea on December 7, 2006. It debuted as the top film, grossing $2,478,626; however, it experienced a significant decline of 76% in its second weekend and was subsequently pulled from most screens before Christmas. The sales of approximately 780,000 tickets were considered disappointing compared to Park's previous films, all of which had exceeded 3 million ticket sales. While the film received mixed reviews in comparison to their earlier works, it still holds significance in their collaborative filmography.

=== Flower of Evil ===
Subsequently, Jeong started working on the script for Yim Pil-sung's project, Flower of Evil. Yim intended to direct a gripping suspense drama that revolved around a married American expatriate falling for a Korean femme fatale. The project, titled Flower of Evil, entered pre-production in 2009, but it was later shelved.

=== Thirst ===
Thirst was loosely based on Émile Zola's novel Thérèse Raquin. Park and Jeong sought to write and direct from a darkly comical and provocative script involving vampire film tropes. The film explores the carnal awakening of a repressed priest turned vampire named Sang-hyun (acted by Song Kang-ho) as he seeks eternal life and desires Tae-ju (acted by Kim Ok-vin), the abused wife of his childhood friend, Kang-woo (acted by Shin Ha-kyun).

When Thirst was released on April 30, 2009, it sparked divided reactions among the audience. While some viewers felt that Park had successfully lived up to the high expectations set by his previous works, others found the film's plot and visuals too provocative. Nevertheless, the film quickly gained popularity, drawing in 170,000 viewers on its opening day, which set a record for that year's film releases. The viewership of Thirst continued to soar, reaching 2 million viewers by the following weekend. Additionally, the film was selected as one of the 20 entries competing for the prestigious Palme d'Or, the top prize at the Cannes Film Festival. Ultimately, Thirst received the Jury Prize at Cannes, sharing the third place award with British director Andrea Arnold's teen drama Fish Tank. Jeong, together with Park, also won an award for their screenplay in the Sitges Film Festival.

Years later, Bong Joon-ho went on to refer to Thirst (2009), I'm a Cyborg, But That's OK (2006), and Sympathy For Lady Vengeance (2005) as the Jeong Seo-kyeong Trilogy.

=== The Handmaiden ===
The inspiration for the film came from 2002 novel, Fingersmith, written by Welsh author Sarah Waters. However, the setting was modified from Victorian-era Britain to 1930s Korea during the period of Japanese colonial rule. The plot revolves around a young pickpocket named Sook-hee (acted by Kim Tae-ri) who is recruited by a conman named Count Fujiwara (acted by Ha Jung-woo). Fujiwara's plan is to gather information from heiress Lady Hideko (acted by Kim Min-hee) whom he intends to marry, manipulate, and steal her wealth. However, Fujiwara does not anticipate the strong attraction that develops between Sook-hee and Hideko, and this intense connection adds layers of complexity to an already intricate and constantly evolving story.

At the core of the narrative lies a romantic relationship between the two leading female characters. This aspect holds particular significance given the predominant male influence in both the Korean and Western film industries. Jeong has consistently shown a deep interest in homosexuality, which is not limited to her involvement in this film but extends to her general curiosity on the subject. She has extensively studied the topic and also bears insight from having many queer friends. Moreover, Jeong sought her friend's input on various iterations of the scripts, ultimately valuing their perspective and incorporating their feedback into the creative process.

The Handmaiden competed for the Palme d'Or at Cannes and had its premiere at the festival's 69th installment in the Grand Theatre Lumiere. It received a remarkable five-minute standing ovation. While the film did not sweep awards at the festival, it achieved considerable success by securing lucrative export deals from film marketers in 176 countries. This achievement set a new record for a South Korean film, surpassing the previous record held by Snowpiercer (2013), a fantasy film by Bong Joon-ho which had been sold in 167 countries. Jeong, together with Park, also won awards for their screenplay from the Chicago Film Critics Association.

The Handmaiden had a successful theatrical release on June 1, 2016, attracting approximately 300,000 viewers on its opening day. Within the first two days, the film surpassed 550,000 viewers, making it a box office-topping hit. In South Korea, the film sold more than 4 million tickets altogether. Due to popular demand, the film's screenplay was officially published just two months later in August 2016.

=== The Truth Beneath ===
The screenplay for The Truth Beneath was based on Lee Kyung-mi's earlier work, Female Teacher. During Park's time directing Stoker in the United States, he contacted Lee and proposed the idea of developing a subplot within it. This suggestion eventually led to the creation of The Truth Beneath. A team of screenwriters, Lee, Park, Jeong, and Kim Da-young, collaborated on the script for the film.

=== Believer ===
Jeong collaborated with director Lee Hae-young to co-write the remake of Johnnie To's 2012 gritty mainland crime saga, Drug War. The film, titled Believer, retains the core elements of To's original work; however, while faithfully recreating certain iconic scenes, Lee and Jeong made substantial changes to the plot and character dynamics in other areas. Notably, the remake's subdued resolution sparked significant discussion, as it diverged dramatically from To's action-packed finale.

=== Mother ===
Mother was a remake of the 2010 Japanese TV series of the same title. Jeong initially felt hesitant about writing a drama due to a lack of energy and space. When offered an opportunity by tvN, she considered the chance to tell a story about a mother and child for the next five years to be a rare opportunity. Despite feeling unprepared, Jeong decided to give it a try. She even sought the opinion of her eldest child, who initially responded with "No." However, when Jeong mentioned that the main character would be an elementary school student, her eldest child responded with excitement, changing their initial "No" to "Really?" She was nominated for Best Screenplay at the 54th Baeksang Arts Awards, while the drama itself won the award for Best Television Drama at the same event. Additionally, the drama was honored for Best Mini-series at the 13th Seoul International Drama Awards. It was also nominated for Best Series in the 1st Cannes International Series Festival.

=== Decision to Leave ===
Decision to Leave originated from an idea proposed by Park. He suggested exploring the concept of a woman who kills her husband twice, specifically with the natural setting of mountains in mind. Jeong aimed to portray the most fundamental and instinctive love without relying on words. The movie's plot revolves around a married detective who becomes involved with Song So-rae, a widow and a suspect in her husband's death, while investigating the case. Jeong had a specific vision for the character of So-rae and desired to cast Tang Wei in the role.

I've been writing screenplays for over 20 years, but Decision to Leave humbled me again.

— Jeong Seo-kyung, interview with Yes24

In April 2022, Decision to Leave was chosen to compete for the Palme d'Or at Cannes. There, Park won Best Director. It also received multiple other award nominations, including Best Film Not in the English Language and Best Direction at the 76th British Academy Film Awards. Additionally, it was selected as South Korea's entry for Best International Feature Film at the 95th Academy Awards, making it to the December shortlist. The film was also recognized as one of the top five international films of 2022 by the National Board of Review. Jeong, together with Park, also won numerous accolades for their screenplay. Recognitions include accolades from the Asian Film Awards, Baeksang Art Awards, Blue Dragon Awards. Decision to Leave was released theatrically on June 29, 2022, in South Korea.

=== Little Women ===
Little Women was a drama based on Louisa May Alcott's novel of the same name. It follows the story of three sisters (acted by Kim Go-eun, Nam Ji-hyun, and Park Ji-hoo) who grew up in poverty but bravely confront the wealthiest and most influential family in Korea. Jeong started working on the drama in 2019 while simultaneously writing the screenplay for Decision to Leave. Jeong did not write a synopsis before beginning work on the drama, which initially caused confusion among the actors regarding their characters' emotions and the overall plot. However, as each new script was released, they gradually learned about the story and made necessary adjustments. This unconventional approach contributed to the unique style of Little Women. Park himself enjoyed the drama, and Jeong mentioned that it was difficult to ignore all the comments he made. After Jeong wrote the script for the first part, she received a positive response from the production company. However, she felt uncertain about achieving believability in a world blending fantasy and reality; Jeong believed that only art director Ryu Seong-hui, who had previously worked with her on The Handmaiden, could accomplish this. Through multiple meetings, she gradually convinced Ryu to join the production.

Additionally, Jeong desired to collaborate with Kim Hee-won, as director, for the project, as she was captivated by her visionary approach and talent for conceptualizing abstract ideas while watching Kim's Vincenzo. Kim was well known for her strong dedication, fully committing herself to projects and even sacrificing meals and sleep for them; she rarely had time to read scripts from other works. Knowing Kim's availability after finishing Vincenzo, Cho Moon-joo from Studio Dragon promptly presented her with Little Women's script. Jeong successfully assembled a team, consisting of 70% women across the cast and crew, marking a significant milestone in the history of drama production. It was the first time that women held all key positions such as chief producer, writer, director, and art director.

Later, the series garnered praise for its stunning scenography, characterized by lavish set designs and meticulous props. At the 59th Baeksang Arts Awards, the drama received four nominations, including a Technical Award nomination for Ryu, which she ultimately won. Jeong was also nominated for Best Screenplay, while the drama itself received nominations for Best Director and Best Drama.

== Writing style ==
During the early stages of her career, Jeong wrote screenplays based on ideas provided by film studios or directors. However, immersing herself in their given characters and situations was not a simple task; in her case, she found that she needed something akin to a spell to fully engage with unfamiliar characters and situations at the outset of a production. Jeong usually started her research first.

If my film contains femininity, childlike innocence, fairytale beauty, optimism, excitement, gratitude, and useless fantasies, it comes from Jeong Seo-kyung.

— Park Chan-wook, Preface in Lady Vengeance Screenplay Collection.

Jeong's longest-serving partner has been the director Park. Together, they have collaborated on five works, starting with Sympathy For Lady Vengeance, then followed by I'm a Cyborg, But That's OK, Thirst, The Handmaiden, and Decision to Leave. In the initial stages of the process, they would discuss and agree upon a treatment, after which Jeong proceeded with the first draft. For the second draft, they would share a computer and collaborate on the same files; each of them had their own monitor and keyboard, enabling seamless teamwork. As one person typed on the keyboard, the text would instantly appear on the other person's monitor, allowing them to work together on revisions side by side. In the final stage, director Park would work on the script alone or with a few members of his cast or crew, adding his personal, final touches.

Jeong has found it challenging to develop male characters when writing a script, while Park has faced similar difficulties in developing female characters. In a way, they have complemented each other, as their strengths and weaknesses have aligned well, thus allowing them to create well-rounded characters together. The combo of Park and Jeong has since created memorable female characters in the history of Korean cinema: Geum-ja from Lady Vengeance, Young-shin from I'm a Cyborg, But That's OK, Tae-ju from Thirst, Hideko and Sook-hee from The Handmaiden, and finally Song Seo-rae from Decision to Leave are just a few examples.

Critics have observed that the women of Park and Jeong's scripts choose to live authentically rather than being objectified, and they fearlessly explore their own desires, leaving a lasting impact on watchers; additionally, these characters often find themselves in extreme situations. For Korean moviegoers who are accustomed to male-dominated plots, the sheer presence of these female characters has not only shocking but also a breath of fresh air.

Jeong says that when she designs characters, she thinks about their flaws first; they have their own unique goals and directions, and they are drawn to resemble oneself and depict characters that one can empathize with rather than simply being beautiful, righteous, or perfect.

== Personal life ==
Jeong married her husband in 2006. They have two sons. She had her first son around the time she finished writing the first draft of Thirst. She had her second son around the time she was helping Park for his American film, Stoker.

== Works ==
=== Short films ===
Short film credits
Year	Title		Credited as				Ref.
Year	English	Korean	director	Director Team	Original Screenplay	Actor	Ref.
2002	Petal	수화(手花)	O Hyun-ju	Yes (Note: Team with Choe Seon-hui)	O Hyun-ju	Yes	
2002	Electricians	전기공들	Yes	Choe Seon-hui	Yes	—N/a	

=== Feature films ===
Feature film credits
Year	Title		director	Credited as			Ref.
Year	English	Korean	director	Original author	Original screenplay	Adapted screenplay	Ref.
2005	Sympathy for Lady Vengeance	친절한 금자씨	Park Chan-wook	—N/a	Co-author (Note: Co-authoring with Park Chan-wook)	—N/a	
2006	Family Matter	모두들, 괜찮아요?	Nam Seon-ho	—N/a	Co-author (Note: with Nam Seon-ho)	—N/a	
2006	I'm a Cyborg, But That's OK	싸이보그지만 괜찮아	Park Chan-wook	—N/a	Co-author	—N/a	
2009	Thirst	박쥐	Park Chan-wook	Émile Zola	—N/a	Co-author	
2016	The Handmaiden	아가씨	Park Chan-wook	Sarah Waters	—N/a	Co-author	
2016	The Truth Beneath	비밀은 없다	Lee Kyoung-mi	—N/a	Lee Kyoung-mi	Co-author (Note: with Lee Kyoung-mi, Park Chan-wook, Kim Da-yeong, and Jung So-young)	
2017	A Special Lady	미옥	Lee An-gyu	—N/a	Lee An-gyu	Adaptation	
2018	Believer	독전	Lee Hae-young	—N/a	Johnnie To	Co-author (Note: with Lee Hae-young)	
2022	Decision to Leave	헤어질 결심	Park Chan-wook	—N/a	Co-author	—N/a	

=== Television dramas ===
Television drama credits
Year	Title		Network	Director	Credited as			Ref.
Year	English	Korean	Network	Director	Original Author	Original Screenplay	Adapted Screenplay	Ref.
2018	Mother	마더	tvN	Kim Cheol-kyu	—N/a	Yuji Sakamoto	Adaptation	
2023	Little Women	작은 아씨들	tvN	Kim Hee-won	Louisa May Alcott	—N/a	Adaptation	
2025	Tempest	북극성	Disney+	Kim Hee-won	—N/a	Yes	—N/a	

== Publications ==
Books
Year	Title		Publisher	ISBN	Ref.
Year	English	Korean	Publisher	ISBN	Ref.
2005	Lady Vengeance (Novel)	친절한 금자씨	Random House Korea	ISBN 9788959244935	
2009	Thirst (Novel)	박쥐	That Book	ISBN 9788996144830	
2016	Lady Vengeance (Script)	아가씨 각본	That Book	ISBN 9788994040899	
2016	Thrist (Script)	박쥐 각본	That Book	ISBN 9788994040998	
2016	I'm a Cyborg, But That's OK (Script)	싸이보그지만 괜찮아 각본	That Book	ISBN 9788994040981	
2017	There Are No Script Secrets	각본 비밀은 없다	Your Mind	ISBN 9791186946138	

== Accolades ==
=== Awards and nominations ===
Awards and nominations of Jeong
Award ceremony	Year	Category	Nominee	Result	Ref.
Asia Contents Awards & Global OTT Awards	2023	Best Creative	Little Women	Nominated	
Asia Contents Awards & Global OTT Awards	2023	Best Writer	Little Women	Nominated	
Asian Film Awards	2017	Best Screenplay (Note: Award shared with Park Chan-wook)	The Handmaiden	Nominated	
Asian Film Awards	2023	Best Film	Decision to Leave	Nominated	
Asian Film Awards	2023	Best Screenplay	Decision to Leave	Won	
Asia Pacific Screen Awards	2022	Best Screenplay	Decision to Leave	Nominated	
Baeksang Arts Awards	2017	Best Screenplay	The Handmaiden	Nominated	
Baeksang Arts Awards	2018	Best Screenplay	Mother	Nominated	
Baeksang Arts Awards	2023	Best Drama	Little Women	Nominated	
Baeksang Arts Awards	2023	Best Screenplay	Little Women	Nominated	
Bechdel Day	2022	Bechdelians of the Year	Decision to Leave	Won	
Blue Dragon Film Awards	2022	Best Film	Decision to Leave	Won	
Blue Dragon Film Awards	2022	Best Screenplay	Decision to Leave	Won	
29th Chicago Film Critics Association Awards	2017	Best Screenplay	The Handmaiden	Won	
Chunsa Film Art Awards	2022	Best Screenplay	Decision to Leave	Nominated	
CJ ENM Visionary	2023	2023 Visionary	Jeong Seo-kyeong	Won	
Director's Cut Awards	2018	Best Screenplay	Believer	Nominated	
Director's Cut Awards	2023	Best Screenplay	Decision to Leave	Won	
Grand Bell Awards	2022	Best Film	Decision to Leave	Won	
Grand Bell Awards	2022	Best Screenplay	Decision to Leave	Won	
Kinolights Awards	2022	Korean Drama of the Year	Little Women	4th	
Korean Association of Film Critics Awards	2023	Best Picture	Decision to Leave	Won	
Korean Association of Film Critics Awards	2023	Korean Association of Film 10 selections of Kim Hyun-seung	Decision to Leave	Won	
Korean Association of Film Critics Awards	2023	Best Screenplay	Decision to Leave	Won	
Korean Film Producers Association Award	2023	Best Film	Decision to Leave	Won	
Korean Film Producers Association Award	2023	Best Screenplay	Decision to Leave	Won	
Sitges Film Festival	2007	Best Screenplay	I'm a Cyborg, But That's OK	Won	
Women in Film Korea Festival	2022	Best Screenplay	Decision to Leave	Won	

=== State honors ===
Name of country, award ceremony, year given, and name of honor
Country	Award Ceremony	Year	Honor	Ref.
South Korea	Korean Popular Culture and Arts Awards (Note: Honors are given at the Korean Popular Culture and Arts Awards, arranged by the Korea Creative Content Agency and hosted by the Ministry of Culture, Sports and Tourism. They are awarded to those who have contributed to the arts and South Korea's pop culture.)	2023	Presidential Commendation	

=== Listicle ===
Name of publisher, year listed, name of listicle, and placement
Publisher	Year	List	Placement	Ref.
Cine21	2006	8 Chungmuro Screenwriters	Shortlisted	
Cine21	2023	22 Writers	Shortlisted	
Flat Newsletter	2022	The 2022 Woman of the Year	Won	
Yeodutalk	2022	Person of the Year	Won	
