= Little Women (2022 TV series) =

2022 South Korean television series

- Promotional poster
- Hangul: 작은 아씨들
- RR: Jageun assideul
- MR: Chagŭn assidŭl
- Genre: Mystery; Family drama
- Developed by: Hong Ki-sung (tvN); Kim Young-Kyu (Studio Dragon)
- Written by: Jeong Seo-kyeong
- Directed by: Kim Hee-won
- Starring: Kim Go-eun; Nam Ji-hyun; Park Ji-hu
- Music by: Park Se-joon
- Country of origin: South Korea
- Original language: Korean
- No. of episodes: 12

Production
- Producers: Cho Moon-joo (CP); Shin Ye-ji; Jo Soo-young
- Production locations: South Korea; Singapore
- Camera setup: Single-camera
- Running time: 77 minutes
- Production company: Studio Dragon

Original release
- Network: tvN
- Release: September 3 – October 9, 2022

Little Women (Korean: 작은 아씨들; RR: Jageun assideul) is a South Korean television series directed by Kim Hee-won, and starring Kim Go-eun, Nam Ji-hyun, and Park Ji-hu. It aired from September 3 to October 9, 2022, on tvN's Saturdays and Sundays at 21:10 (KST). It is also available for streaming on Netflix in selected regions.

== Synopsis ==
The series depicts the zeal of three poor sisters; In-joo, In-hye, and In-kyung for money, independence, and love. The supposedly dead friend of one of the sisters left her 70 billion won but the people behind it, Korea's richest family, will do anything to stop them.

== Cast ==
=== Main ===
- Kim Go-eun as Oh In-joo

- Park So-yi as young Oh In-joo
The eldest sister. She grew up in a terribly poor environment and is still poor. Ever since she was a young child, In-joo realized that money was the most important thing to protect herself and her family. Her dream is to live an ordinary life like other people. She gets involved in a case that could change her life.

- Nam Ji-hyun as Oh In-kyung

The middle sister. She is an enthusiastic reporter at a news station. In-kyung believes in doing the right thing. She also has always been poor, but grew up in a more comfortable environment, so money doesn't rule her life. She begins to dig into a mysterious case that she encountered when she first became a reporter.

- Park Ji-hu as Oh In-hye

The youngest sister, who studies at a prestigious art high school due to her natural drawing skills, and sometimes feels that her sisters' love for her is too much. Her foolishness lets others exploit her financial situation. Her sisters are her de facto parents and are fiercely protective of her.

=== Supporting ===
==== People around Oh In-kyung ====
- Kang Hoon as Ha Jong-ho

Oh In-kyung's childhood friend and strong supporter, who has feelings for her.

- Cho Seung-yeon as Jo Wan-gyu

Director of OBN Social Department.

- Gong Min-jeung as Jang Ma-ri

A reporter at OBN news agency.

==== Family of three sisters ====
- Kim Mi-sook as Oh Hye-seok

Great-aunt of the three sisters.

- Park Ji-young as Ahn Hee-yeon

Mother of the three sisters.

==== Wonryong's house ====
- Um Ki-joon as Park Jae-sang

A lawyer and rookie politician who gets involved with the three sisters.

- Uhm Ji-won as Won Sang-ah

General's daughter, politician's wife and Director of the Museum of Art. Her relationship with the three sisters begins when Sang-ah's daughter Hyorin becomes involved with Oh In-hye.

- Jeon Chae-eun as Park Hyo-rin

Park Jae-sang and Won Sang-ah's daughter, and Oh In-hye's best friend.

- Lee Do-yeop as Won Ki-seon

Security Commander in the 1980s and Won Sang-ah's father.

- Lee Min-woo as Won Sang-woo

Won Ki-seon's son and Won Sang-ah's older brother. He was a son who didn't matter to his father.

==== Wonryong's group ====
- Wi Ha-joon as Choi Do-il

He graduated from a prestigious university and becomes involved with Oh In-ju. Though Do-il's true allegiance is unclear for most of the part of the series, he is shown to be protective of In-ju.

- Park Bo-kyung as Go Soo-im

Park Jae-sang's right-hand assistant.

- Jang Gwang as Jang Sa-pyoung

Principal of Wonryong School.

=== Special appearances ===
- Choo Ja-hyun as Jin Hwa-young (Ep. 1–6, 8, 11, 12)

In-ju's secret friend.

- Oh Jung-se as Director Shin / Shin Hyun-min (Ep. 1–3, 6)

A director who was suspected of having an affair with Hwa-young.

- Hong Seo-hee as expensive shoes woman (Ep. 1)
- Song Joong-ki as shoe salesman (Ep. 2)
- Adrian Pang as Hotel Manager (Ep. 8)
- Joshua Tan as Hotel Receptionist (Ep. 8)
- Bridget Fernandez as Hotel Staff (Ep. 8)
- Ebi Shankara as Cafe Waiter (Ep. 8)

== Production ==
=== Development ===
In an interview with Tatler Asia on November 25, 2021, screenwriter Jeong Seo-kyung disclosed her involvement, "I'm working with the director of Vincenzo for a Korean adaptation of Little Women. The leading actresses are Kim Go-eun and Nam Ji-hyun while the male lead is Wi Ha-joon from Squid Game. I actually read the book, Little Women, when I was young and I really loved it."

=== Casting ===
On December 23, 2021, it was confirmed that tvN's series titled as Little Women directed by Kim Hee-won, written by Jeong Seo-kyung and produced by Studio Dragon, with Kim Go-eun, Nam Ji-hyun and Park Ji-hu as main leads. On October 19, 2021, MS Team Entertainment revealed that Wi Ha-joon was offered a role in the series. On the same day, it was reported that casting for the series was complete.

=== Filming ===
On March 3, 2022, it was confirmed that actor Wi Ha-joon had tested positive for COVID-19. He was expected to be released from quarantine on the 8th, and the diagnosis was confirmed when he was released.

Filming took place from June to July 2022; filming locations include various locations around Singapore.

== Controversies ==
=== Plagiarism ===
On September 5, 2022, the staff issued an apology for the poster's resemblance to a Japanese beauty brand.

On September 8, 2022, the drama's poster maker Propaganda issued an official apology for the plagiarism of the poster similar to the exhibition poster of a Japanese cosmetics brand from 2016.

=== Ban in Vietnam ===
On October 3, 2022, Vietnam's Authority of Broadcasting and Electronic Information requested that Little Women be removed from the Vietnamese version of Netflix due to historical falsification of the Vietnam War. According to the Director of Authority, Lê Quang Tự Do, the series breached the Vietnamese media and cinema laws due to inaccurate statements about the Vietnam War in episodes 3 and 8, which distorted Vietnamese history by glorifying South Korea's involvement in the Vietnam War, including war crimes committed by South Korean soldiers.

On October 7, 2022, the drama staff apologized and promised to be more careful with both the social sensitivity and the production process in the future.

== Original soundtrack ==
Little Women

Soundtrack album by Various
- Released: 2022
- Genre: Soundtrack
- Languages: Korean; English
- Labels: Genie Music; Stone Music Entertainment

=== Part 1 ===
Released on September 18, 2022
| No. | Title | Lyrics | Music | Artist | Length |
|---|---|---|---|---|---|
| 1. | "Enough" | eSNa | Primary, eSNa | Zior Park | 3:46 |
| 2. | "Enough" (Inst.) | | Primary, eSNa | | 3:46 |

=== Part 2 ===
Released on October 2, 2022
| No. | Title | Lyrics | Music | Artist | Length |
|---|---|---|---|---|---|
| 1. | "La Vie" | Park Ye-seo | Woo Ji-hoon | Sole | 3:49 |
| 2. | "La Vie" (Inst.) | | Woo Ji-hoon | | 3:49 |

== Viewership ==
Little Women : South Korea viewers per episode (millions)

| Season | Episode number | | | | | | | | | | | | Average |
| Season | 1 | 2 | 3 | 4 | 5 | 6 | 7 | 8 | 9 | 10 | 11 | 12 | Average |
|---|---|---|---|---|---|---|---|---|---|---|---|---|---|
| 1 | 1.402 | 1.697 | 1.315 | 1.696 | 1.666 | 2.040 | 1.449 | 2.050 | 1.685 | 2.230 | 1.767 | 2.618 | 1.801 |

Source: Audience measurement performed nationwide by Nielsen Korea.

Average TV viewership ratings
| Ep. | Original broadcast date | Average audience share (Nielsen Korea) | |
| Ep. | Original broadcast date | Nationwide | Seoul |
|---|---|---|---|
| 1 | September 3, 2022 | 6.395% (1st) | 6.931% (1st) |
| 2 | September 4, 2022 | 7.747% (1st) | 8.519% (1st) |
| 3 | September 10, 2022 | 5.587% (1st) | 6.110% (1st) |
| 4 | September 11, 2022 | 7.256% (1st) | 8.315% (1st) |
| 5 | September 17, 2022 | 7.038% (1st) | 8.072% (1st) |
| 6 | September 18, 2022 | 8.338% (1st) | 8.898% (1st) |
| 7 | September 24, 2022 | 6.014% (1st) | 7.033% (1st) |
| 8 | September 25, 2022 | 8.676% (1st) | 9.710% (1st) |
| 9 | October 1, 2022 | 7.346% (1st) | 8.935% (1st) |
| 10 | October 2, 2022 | 9.701% (1st) | 11.278% (1st) |
| 11 | October 8, 2022 | 7.707% (1st) | 8.931% (1st) |
| 12 | October 9, 2022 | 11.105% (1st) | 11.968% (1st) |
| Average | | 7.743% | 8.725% |
In the table above, the blue numbers represent the lowest published ratings and the red numbers represent the highest published ratings.

== Reception ==
=== Critical response ===
Little Women has an approval rating of 100% on review aggregator website Rotten Tomatoes, based on 5 reviews, and an average rating of 8.5/10.

== Accolades ==
=== Awards and nominations ===
| Award ceremony | Year | Category | Nominee | Result | Ref. |
|---|---|---|---|---|---|
| APAN Star Awards | 2023 | Drama of the Year | Little Women | Won | |
| APAN Star Awards | 2023 | Excellence Award, Actress in a Miniseries | Uhm Ji-won | Won | |
| Asia Contents Awards & Global OTT Awards | 2023 | Best Creative | Little Women | Nominated | |
| Asia Contents Awards & Global OTT Awards | 2023 | Best Writer | Jeong Seo-kyung | Nominated | |
| Baeksang Arts Awards | 2023 | Best Drama | Little Women | Nominated | |
| Baeksang Arts Awards | 2023 | Best Director | Kim Hee-won | Nominated | |
| Baeksang Arts Awards | 2023 | Best Screenplay | Jeong Seo-kyung | Nominated | |
| Baeksang Arts Awards | 2023 | Technical Award | Ryu Seong-hui | Won | |
| Bechdel Day | 2023 | The Bechdel Day 2023 series | Little Women | Top 10 | |
| Bechdel Day | 2023 | Person of the Year (Producer) | Cho Moon-ju | Won | |
| Kinolights Awards | 2022 | Korean Drama Of The Year | Little Women | 4th | |
| Kinolights Awards | 2022 | Korean Actress Of The Year | Kim Go-eun | 4th | |

=== Listicles ===
Name of publisher, year listed, name of listicle, and placement
| Publisher | Year | Listicle | Placement | Ref. |
|---|---|---|---|---|
| Entertainment Weekly | 2025 | The 21 best Korean shows on Netflix to watch now | Top 21 | |
