= San Diego Film Critics Society Award for Best Foreign Language Film =

Annual US film award

The San Diego Film Critics Society Award for Best Foreign Language Film is an annual film award given by the San Diego Film Critics Society.

== Winners ==
=== 1990s ===
Year	Winner	Country	Director(s)
1996	Ridicule	France	Patrice Leconte
1998	Life Is Beautiful (La vita è bella)	Italy	Roberto Benigni
1999	Tango (Tango, no me dejes nunca)	Argentina / Spain	Carlos Saura

=== 2000s ===
Year	Winner	Country	Director(s)
2000	The Colour of Paradise (Rang-e khoda)	Iran	Majid Majidi
2001	Amélie (Le fabuleux destin d'Amélie Poulain)	France / Germany	Jean-Pierre Jeunet
2002	Talk to Her (Hable con ella)	Spain	Pedro Almodóvar
2003	The Barbarian Invasions (Les invasions barbares)	Canada / France	Denys Arcand
2003	Irréversible	France	Gaspar Noé
2004	The Sea Inside (Mar adentro)	Spain / France / Italy	Alejandro Amenábar
2005	Innocent Voices (Voces inocentes)	Mexico / Puerto Rico / USA	Luis Mandoki
2006	Riding Alone for Thousands of Miles (Qian li zou dan qi)	China / Hong Kong / Japan	Zhang Yimou
2007	The Diving Bell and the Butterfly (Le scaphandre et le papillon)	France / USA	Julian Schnabel
2008	Let the Right One In (Låt den rätte komma in)	Sweden	Tomas Alfredson
2009	Il Divo	Italy	Paolo Sorrentino

=== 2010s ===
Year	Winner	Country	Director(s)
2010	I Am Love (Io sono l'amore)	Italy	Luca Guadagnino
2011	Le quattro volte	Italy	Michelangelo Frammartino
2012	The Kid with a Bike (Le gamin au vélo)	Belgium / France / Italy	Jean-Pierre and Luc Dardenne
2013	Drug War (Du zhan)	China / Hong Kong	Johnnie To
2014	Force Majeure (Turist)	Sweden	Ruben Östlund
2015	Taxi	Iran	Jafar Panahi
2016	Mountains May Depart	China	Jia Zhangke
2017	Thelma	Norway	Joachim Trier
2018	Shoplifters	Japan	Hirokazu Kore-eda
2019	Parasite	South Korea	Bong Joon-ho

=== 2020s ===
Year	Winner	Country	Director(s)
2020	The Life Ahead (La vita davanti a sé)	Italy	Edoardo Ponti
2021	Parallel Mothers	Spain	Pedro Almodóvar
2022	All Quiet on the Western Front	Germany	Edward Berger
2023	Anatomy of a Fall	France	Justine Triet
2024	All We Imagine as Light	India	Payal Kapadia
2025	It Was Just an Accident	Iran	Jafar Panahi
