= Non-epileptic seizure =

Medical condition

- Other names: Functional seizure, dissociative seizure, non-epileptic attack disorder Formerly: Pseudoseizure
- Specialty: Neurology, psychiatry
- Symptoms: Unresponsiveness, convulsions, altered awareness

Non-epileptic seizures (NES), also known as non-epileptic attack disorder (NEAD), functional seizures, or dissociative seizures, are paroxysmal events that appear similar to an epileptic seizure, but do not involve abnormal, rhythmic discharges of neurons in the brain. Symptoms may include shaking, loss of consciousness, and loss of bladder control.

They may or may not be caused by either physiological or psychological conditions. Physiological causes include fainting, sleep disorders, and heart arrhythmias. Psychological causes are known as psychogenic non-epileptic seizures. Diagnosis may be based on the history of the event and physical examination with support from heart testing and an EEG.

== Terminology ==
The International League Against Epilepsy (ILAE) defines a epileptic seizure as "a transient occurrence of signs or symptoms due to abnormal excessive or synchronous neuronal activity in the brain." Convulsive or non-convulsive seizures can occur in someone who does not have epilepsy – as a consequence of head injury, drug overdose, toxins, eclampsia or febrile convulsions. A provoked (or an un-provoked, or an idiopathic) seizure must generally occur twice before a person is diagnosed with epilepsy.

When used on its own, the term seizure usually refers to an epileptic seizure. The lay use of this word can also include sudden attacks of illness, loss of control, spasm or stroke.

== Signs and symptoms ==
- Convulsions
- Crying out or making a noise
- Stiffening
- Jerky, rhythmic or twitching motions
- Falling down
- Loss of consciousness
- Confusion after returning to consciousness
- Loss of bladder control
- Biting the tongue

== Causes ==
Possible causes include:

- Syncope (fainting)
  - Reflex anoxic seizures
- Breath-holding spells of childhood
- Cataplexy
- Hyperekplexia, also called startle syndrome
- Migraine
- Narcolepsy
- Non-epileptic myoclonus
- Opsoclonus
- Parasomnias, including night terrors
- Paroxysmal kinesigenic dyskinesia
- Tics
- Hypoglycemia

== Diagnosis ==
A wide array of phenomena may or may not resemble epileptic seizures, which may lead to people who do not have epilepsy being misdiagnosed. Indeed, a significant percentage of people initially diagnosed with epilepsy will later heal. In one study, the majority of children referred to a secondary clinic with "fits, faints and funny turns" did not have epilepsy, with syncope (fainting) as the most common alternative. In another study, 39% of children referred to a tertiary epilepsy centre did not have epilepsy, with staring episodes in intellectually disabled children as the most common alternative. In adults, the figures are similar, with one study reporting a 26% rate of misdiagnosis.
