= Kim Hee-won (director) =

South Korean television director

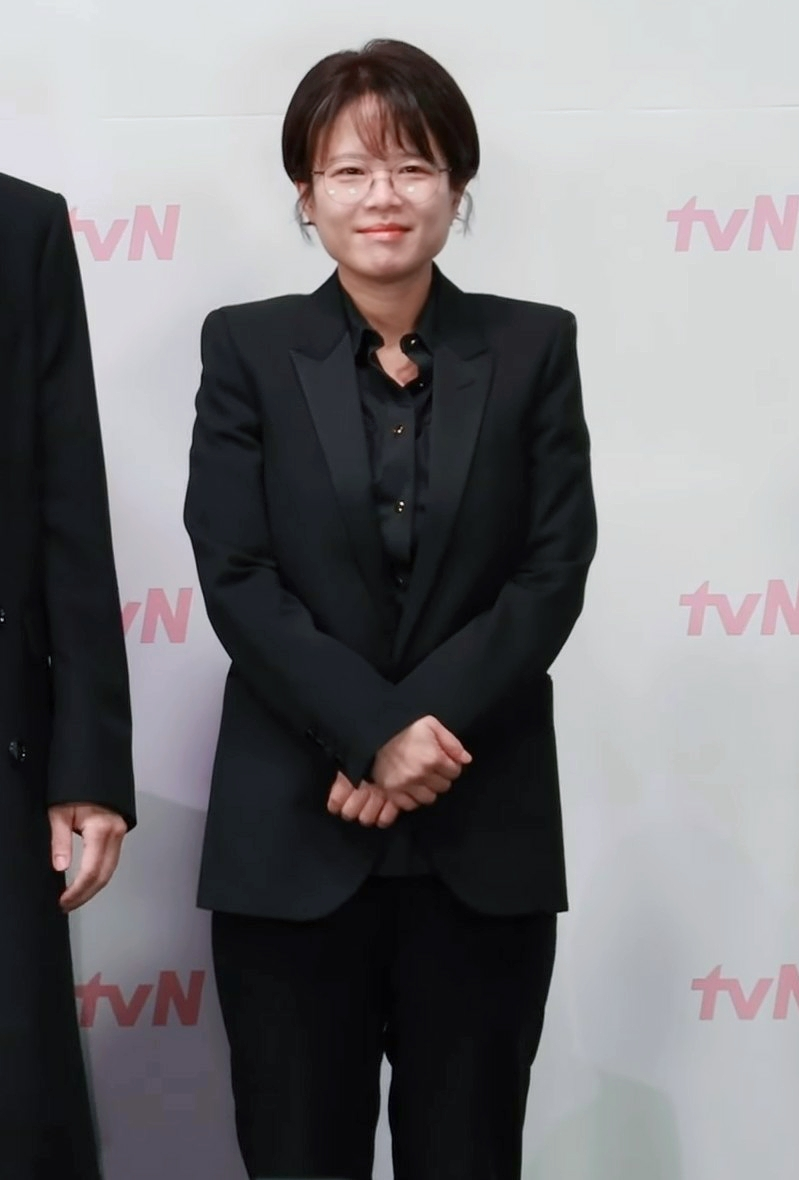
- Kim in 2024
- Born: South Korea
- Education: Korea National University of Arts
- Occupation: Television Director
- Years active: 2006–present
- Employers: MBC (2006–2018); Supermoon Pictures and Studio Dragon (2018–2020); Showrunner (2020–present); Studio Abit (2023–present)
- Honours: Minister of Culture, Sports, and Tourism Commendation

Korean name
- Hangul: 김희원
- Hanja: 金熙元
- RR: Gim Huiwon
- MR: Kim Hŭiwŏn

Kim Hee-won (Korean: 김희원; Hanja: 金熙元) is a South Korean television director. One of her most notable works is the tvN series Vincenzo (2021), the third instalment of Park Jae-beom's "Justice Trilogy", for which she received a Best Director nomination at the 57th Baeksang Art Awards. Additionally, she earned the Minister of Culture, Sports, and Tourism Commendation at the 2021 Korea Content Awards.

== Career ==
=== 2006–2018: Early career at MBC ===
After graduating from Korea National University of Arts, Kim Hee-won joined MBC in 2006, where she began her career as an assistant director. Notably, she served as an assistant director for Moon Hee-jung's The Last Scandal of My Life.

In 2011, Kim Hee-won joined Cable Channel MBN, which made history as the first domestic broadcasting company in Korea to hold an open audition for actors for the sitcom Come, Come, Absolutely Come. The sitcom revolves around the daily lives of three funny men and women who start living together under one roof. The audition event took place on October 11 at the Maekyung Media Center in Seoul. The series presented a unique combination of an American drama and a sitcom, showcasing the creative talents of a team of graduates from Korea National University of Arts, including Kim Hee-won for her directorial debut, Hwang Yeo-reum, and writer Kim Gyeong-mi. Notably, director Lee Jang-soo from Logos Film also served as the producer of the show.

In 2012, Kim returned to MBC and reunited with screenwriter Moon Hee-jung for her miniseries Missing You. In this project, Kim served as the assistant director under the guidance of director Lee Jae-dong, who had previously directed dramas such as Can't Lose and Thank You.

In 2014, Kim took on the role of Team B director for the MBC drama You Are My Destiny, with Lee Dong-yoon as the main director. This drama was a remake of the Taiwanese drama Fated to Love You starring Joe Chen and Ethan Ruan, which originally aired in 2008 and garnered high ratings. The adaptation was done by scriptwriter Joo Chan-ok and Jo Jin-kook. The series also brought together Jang Hyuk and Jang Na-ra, who had previously co-starred in the drama Successful Story of a Bright Girl back in 2002, marking their reunion after twelve years.

In the one-act drama "MBC Drama Festival 2014: Old Farewell," Kim teamed up once again with Jang Hyuk and Jang Na-ra. The drama, written by Min Ji Eun, delves into a time travel narrative. The story follows Soo Hyuk, a former boxer who unexpectedly inherits his ex-wife Chae Hee's house. During his exploration of the house, he stumbles upon a hidden attic containing old Polaroid photos that possess the ability to transport him back in time. In this past timeline, Chae Hee is confronted with an impending death, prompting Soo Hyuk to embark on a desperate mission to rescue her.

Kim took on the role of Team B director for several MBC dramas. In Warm and Cozy, the main director was Park Hong-kyun. Glamorous Temptation was directed by Kim Sang-hyub, while Golden Pouch was helmed by Kim Dae-jin.

Kim received recognition in 2017 for her directing skills as the main director of Money Flower, featured Jang Hyuk, Park Se-young, Lee Mi-sook, and Lee Soon-jae in the leading roles. This drama, which concluded its run in early February, garnered widespread popularity and achieved a peak viewership rating of 23.9% (Nielsen Korea, nationwide).

=== 2018–2021: Studio Dragon ===
Kim left MBC in June 2018. According to a statement from a broadcasting official in July 2018, Kim signed a directing contract with Supermoon Pictures and Studio Dragon. It was anticipated that she would alternate between the two production companies to take on directing roles.

Kim's first project at Studio Dragon was The Crowned Clown. Co-authored by Kim Seon-deok and Shin Ha-eun, it is a remake of the 2012 film Masquerade and features Yeo Jin-goo, Kim Sang-kyung, and Lee Se-young in the lead roles and revolved around the story of a Joseon King and his doppelganger, a clown. In order to escape the power struggles within the royal court, the king places the clown on the throne. The series introduces new characters and storylines while staying true to the original movie. The production presentation for the drama was held at the Imperial Palace Hotel in Nonhyeon-dong, Seoul.

Kim played a significant role in the success of The Crowned Clown. She captured the essence of a well-crafted historical drama and skillfully brought the recreated narrative to life while showcasing the actors' talents. She effectively utilized natural lighting and meticulous mise-en-scène, creating visually pleasing scenes. Through the skillful use of various camera angles, such as diagonal and high angles, she maximized the impact of each scene and heightened the viewers immersive experience. Viewers gave her the nickname "God Hee-won" because she had a remarkable talent for creating beautiful visuals similar with a film.

In May 2020, director Kim and screenwriter Park Jae-beom teamed up for Vincenzo, which served as the final part of Park Jae-beom's "Justice Trilogy." Vincenzo is 2021 television series starring Song Joong-ki as the title character Vincenzo alongside Jeon Yeo-been, Ok Taec-yeon, Kim Yeo-jin, and Kwak Dong-yeon. The first script reading took place on January 5, 2021. It aired on tvN from February 20, 2021, to May 2, 2021l It was broadcast every Saturday and Sunday at 21:00 (KST). Subsequently, each episode was made available on Netflix in South Korea and internationally after its television broadcast.

Kim Hee-won said, "I also met the author as a fan of his previous work, so I have a great desire to make it well. In fact, from a directing perspective, writer Park Jae-beom's script is a burdensome script to direct. Since it is implemented in so much detail in the script, if a review comes back saying that it was not implemented properly, it is 100% the directing's fault. It's that attractive. In addition, because the main character's setting is unique and the situations he encounters are also unique, the most important thing from a directing perspective is to ensure that the comical and dark parts are delivered in a balanced manner so that the overall balance of the drama is not lost."

Kim's directorial work on Vincenzo earned her a nomination for Best Director at 57th Baeksang Art Awards. Furthermore, she was honored with the Minister of Culture, Sports, and Tourism Commendation in the Broadcast Video Industry Development Contribution category during the 2021 Korea Content Awards.

Kim Hee-won collaborated with two frequent collaborators of Park Chan-wook, writer Jeong Seo-kyeong and production designer Ryu Seong-hui, in the Korean mini-series adaptation of Louisa May Alcott's novel Little Women. Writer Jeong Seo-kyeong expressed her desire to work with Kim on the project after being captivated by her visionary approach and talent for conceptualizing abstract ideas while watching Vincenzo. Kim Hee-won was known for her strong dedication, often sacrificing meals and sleep to fully commit herself to projects. Despite her busy schedule, CP Cho Moon-joo from Studio Dragon promptly presented her with the script after she finished working on Vincenzo. They successfully assembled a remarkable team, with 70% of the cast and crew being women, marking a significant milestone in drama production history. This was the first time that women held all key positions such as Chief Producer (CP), writer, director, and production designer.

Mini-series Little Women follows the story of three sisters (Kim Go-eun, Nam Ji-hyun, and Park Ji-hoo) who grew up in poverty but bravely confront the wealthiest and most influential family in Korea. The collaboration between Kim and production designer Ryu Seong-hui led to breathtaking scenography, characterized by opulent set designs and meticulous props. At the 59th Baeksang Arts Awards, the drama received four nominations, including nominations for Best Art Director, Best Director and Best Drama.

=== 2020–present: Showrunner, Studio Abit and Imaginus ===
Directors Jang Young-woo and Kim joined forces on January 31, 2020, to establish the content company Showrunners (쇼러너스). Their inaugural project, Park Ji-eun's drama Queen of Tears, features Jang Young-woo and Kim as co-directors. Filming for the series commenced in the first half of 2023. In addition to Showrunners, the production is a collaborative effort involving Culture Depot and Studio Dragon as co-producers.

tvN's weekend drama Queen of Tears is a story about the complicated love between Hong Hae-in (played by Kim Ji-won), a powerful businesswoman from the Queen's Group company, and Baek Hyun-woo (played by Kim Soo-hyun), the son of a supermarket owner. Despite being married for three years, their relationship faces many challenges and unexpected events. The production presentation for held at Radama Seoul Hotel in Sindorim on March 7, 2024.

In August 2023, reports emerged that Kim had joined Studio Abit (스튜디오어빗), as leader of drama department. Studio Abit is a joint venture between Imaginus and Innocean, with Hwang Ji-young appointed as the CEO of Studio Abit and also the leader of the entertainment department. The primary objective of Studio Abit is to produce relatable and enjoyable commercial content, including entertainment shows, dramas, and movies.

In March 2024, Ryu Hyung-jin, the vice president of Imaginus, provided exclusive insights into ten labels under Imaginus and their respective leaders in an interview with Cine21. Among these labels were Showrunners (쇼러너스), which housed directors Jang Young-woo, Kim Hee-won, Yoo Je-won, Choi Jeong-gyu, Song Kyung-hwa, and other creators; and Studio AA (스튜디오 AA), co-led by Gang Dong-won. Imaginus is a content production company established by Choi Jin-hee, the former CEO of Studio Dragon, in December 2021.

Ryu also announced several upcoming projects of Imaginus, including Polaris, which will be co-produced by Showrunner and Studio AA. Prior to that, in March 2023, it was reported that Kim and writer Jeong Seo-kyeong, who previously collaborated on Little Woman, joined forces again for Polaris. The drama is a spy melodrama exploring the journey of spies who have lost their identities and must find themselves. Jun Ji-hyun has been offered the female lead role opposite Gang Dong-won. Imaginus, announced that Polaris had entered the preparation stage on March 28, 2024. The first meeting took place on the 25th. Imaginus further stated that filming for Polaris is planned to commence in April, with the possibility of shooting in international locations being taken into account.

== Filmography ==
=== Television series ===
List of television drama(s)
Year	Title		Network	Credited as			Ref.
Year	English	Korean	Network	Assistant Director	Co-director	Main Director	Ref.
2007	Time Between Dog and Wolf	개와 늑대의 시간	MBC	Kim Hee-won	—N/a	Kim Jin-min	
2008	Last Scandal	내 생애 마지막 스캔들	MBC	Kim Hee-won	—N/a	Lee Tae-gon	
2008	Don't Cry My Love	사랑해, 울지마	MBC	Kim Hee-won	—N/a	Kim Sa-hyun; Lee Dong-yoon	
2011	Come, Come, Absolutely Come	왔어 왔어 제대로 왔어	MBN	—N/a	—N/a	Kim Hee-won	
2012–2013	Missing You	보고싶다	MBC	Kim Hee-won	—N/a	Lee Jae-dong; Park Jae-beom	
2014	You Are My Destiny	운명처럼 널 사랑해	MBC	—N/a	Kim Hee-won	Lee Dong-yoon	
2014	MBC Drama Festival 2014: Old Farewell	MBC 2014 드라마페스티발 《오래된 안녕》	MBC	—N/a	—N/a	Kim Hee-won	
2015	Warm and Cozy	맨도롱 또똣	MBC	—N/a	Kim Hee-won	Park Hong-kyun	
2015	Glamorous Temptation	화려한 유혹	MBC	—N/a	Kim Hee-won	Kim Sang-hyub	
2016	Golden Pouch	황금주머니	MBC	—N/a	Kim Hee-won	Kim Dae-jin	
2017	Money Flower	돈꽃	MBC	—N/a	—N/a	Kim Hee-won	
2019	The Crowned Clown	왕이 된 남자	tvN	—N/a	—N/a	Kim Hee-won	
2019	Crash Landing on You	사랑의 불시착	tvN	—N/a	Kim Hee-won	Lee Jung-hyo	
2020	Vincenzo	빈센조	tvN	—N/a	—N/a	Kim Hee-won	
2023	Little Women	작은 아씨들	tvN	—N/a	—N/a	Kim Hee-won	
2024	Queen of Tears	눈물의 여왕	tvN	—N/a	Kim Hee-won	Jang Young-woo	

=== Web series ===
List of web drama(s)
Year	Title		Network	Credited as		Ref.
Year	English	Korean	Network	Co-director	Main Director	Ref.
2022	Soundtrack 1	사운드트랙 #1	Disney+	—N/a	Kim Hee-won	
2023	Soundtrack 2	사운드트랙 #2	Disney+	Kim Hee-won	Choi Jun-kyu	
2025	Tempest	북극성	Disney+	—N/a	Kim Hee-won	

== Accolades ==
=== Awards and nominations ===
Awards and nominations
Award ceremony	Year	Category	Nominee / Work	Result	Ref.
Asian Academy Creative Awards	2024	Best Direction (Grand Final)	Queen of Tears	Won (Note: Award shared as team with Jang Young-woo)	
Asian Academy Creative Awards	2024	Best Direction (National – Korea)	Queen of Tears	Won	
3rd Asia Contents Awards	2021	Best Creative	Vincenzo	Nominated	
3rd Asia Contents Awards	2021	Best Asian TV Series	Vincenzo	Nominated	
APAN Star Awards	2022	Best Director	Vincenzo	Nominated	
APAN Star Awards	2024	Best Drama	Queen of Tears	Nominated	
26th Asian Television Awards	2021	Best Drama Series	Vincenzo	Won	
57th Baeksang Arts Awards	2021	Best Director – Television	Vincenzo	Nominated	
59th Baeksang Arts Awards	2023	Best Drama	Little Woman	Nominated	
59th Baeksang Arts Awards	2023	Best Director – Television	Little Woman	Nominated	
Brand of the Year Awards	2021	Drama of the Year	Vincenzo	Won	
Brand of the Year Awards	2024	Drama of the Year (Vietnam)	Queen of Tears	Won	
CJ ENM's 30th Anniversary Visionary Selections	2025	Drama	Queen of Tears	Won	
Consumer Rights Day KCA Culture & Entertainment Awards	2024	Best Drama	Queen of Tears	Won	
Filmarks Awards	2024	Excellence Award (Streaming Drama)	Queen of Tears	Won	
Filmarks Awards	2024	Grand Prize (Streaming Drama)	Queen of Tears	Nominated	
Fundex Awards	2024	Best TV Drama	Queen of Tears	Won	
Fundex Awards	2024	Grand Prize (Daesang)	Queen of Tears	Won	
Global TV Demand Awards	2025	Most In-Demand Asian Original Series	Queen of Tears	Nominated	
Korea Drama Awards	2024	Best Drama	Queen of Tears	Won	
Seoul International Drama Awards	2021	Top Excellence Korean Drama	Vincenzo	Won	
Seoul International Drama Awards	2024	Outstanding Korean Drama	Queen of Tears	Won	
TAG Awards Chicago	2025	Best Series	Queen of Tears	Won	
14th Tokyo Drama Awards	2021	Special Award for Foreign Drama	Vincenzo	Won	

=== State honors ===
Name of country, year given, and name of honor
Country	Award Ceremony	Year	Honor	Ref.
South Korea	Korean Content Awards (Note: Honors are given at the Korean Content Awards (대한민국 콘텐츠 대상) arranged by the Korea Creative Content Agency and hosted by the Ministry of Culture, Sports and Tourism. The 2022 Korea Content Awards Ceremony, which started in 2009 and celebrated its 14th this year, aims to inspire pride in the content industry and develop the Korean cultural content industry by discovering and awarding contributors and excellent content that have contributed to the development of the content industry in 2022. It is a place to promote. The winners (works) of honor, which are recommended through the website of the Korea Creative Content Agency (www.kocca.kr) and announced through careful examination by experts and three-step verification, play a leading role in shining the Korean content industry in the world.)	2021	Minister of Culture, Sports and Tourism Commendation; Broadcast Video Industry Development Contribution Category	

=== Listicle ===
Name of publisher, year listed, name of listicle, and placement
Publisher	Year	List	Placement	Ref.
Cine21	2022	Series Director of the Year for Little Woman	1st	
