= Quiz of God =

South Korean television series

- Promotional poster for season 1
- Also known as: Quiz from God
- Hangul: 신의 퀴즈
- Hanja: 神의 퀴즈
- RR: Sinui kwijeu
- MR: Sinŭi k'wijŭ
- Genre: Crime drama Medical drama Mystery
- Created by: Park Jae-beom
- Developed by: OCN; Studio Dragon (season 5)
- Written by: Park Jae-beom (season 1-3); Park Dae-sung (season 4); Lee Doo-il (season 4); Kang Eun-sun (season 5)
- Directed by: Lee Jun-hyeong (season 1); Lee Jung-pyo (season 2); Ahn Jin-woo (season 3); Lee Min-woo-il (season 4); Kim Jong-hyuk (season 5)
- Starring: Ryu Deok-hwan; Yoon Joo-hee; Choi Jung-woo; Park Joon-myun; Kim Dae-jin; Ahn Nae-sang
- Country of origin: South Korea
- Original language: Korean
- No. of seasons: 5
- No. of episodes: 62

Production
- Camera setup: Single-camera
- Running time: 60 minutes
- Production companies: Eight Works; Curo Holdings; EveryShow (season 4 only)

Original release
- Network: OCN
- Release: October 8, 2010 – January 10, 2019

Quiz of God (Korean: 신의 퀴즈; RR: Sinui kwijeu) is a South Korean television series broadcast on cable channel OCN. It was the first medical/forensic crime investigation drama to air in Korea. The series follows genius but eccentric neurosurgeon and forensic doctor Han Jin-woo (played by Ryu Deok-hwan) and his team as they solve suspicious deaths and unravel mysteries involving rare diseases.

The title refers to a local saying that rare diseases are like quizzes God gives to humans so as not to become too arrogant. The first season dealt mostly with inherited rare diseases including porphyria, phenylketonuria, muscular dystrophy, Guillain–Barré syndrome, reflex anoxic seizures and Savant syndrome. Fabry disease, Kleine–Levin syndrome and congenital insensitivity to pain with anhidrosis were featured in the second season.

== Series overview ==
Series	Episodes	Originally released		Airtime
Series	Episodes	First released	Last released	Airtime
1	10	8 October 2010	10 December 2010	Fridays at 22:00 (KST)
2	12	10 June 2011	26 August 2011	Fridays at 24:00 (KST)
3	12	20 May 2012	12 August 2012	Sundays at 23:00 (KST)
4	12	18 May 2014	3 August 2014	Sundays at 23:00 (KST)
5	16	14 November 2018	10 January 2019	Wednesdays and Thursdays at 23:00 (KST)

== Cast ==
=== Main ===
- Ryu Deok-hwan as Jin-woo Han, neurosurgeon and forensic doctor
- Yoon Joo-hee as Kyung-hee Kang, detective
- Choi Jung-woo as Kyu-tae Jang
- Park Joon-myun as Young-shil Jo, medical examiner
- Kim Dae-jin (Note: Credited as Na Yoon) as Seong-do Kim, forensic scientist
- Ahn Nae-sang as Tae-shik Bae
- Lee Donghae as Han Shi-woo
- Kim Jae-kyung as Im Tae-kyung
- Yoon Bo-ra as Jung Seung-bin
- Park Hyo-joo as Moon Soo-an
- Kim Jaewon as Hyeon Sang-pil

=== Recurring ===
- Park Da-an as Go Yoon-jung
- Kim Geon-woo as Nam Joo-nam
- Chu Seung-wook as Park Seung-wook
- Park Ji-a as Seo Yeon-joo
- Ahn Yong-joon as Jung Ha-yoon
- Lee Seol-hee as Min Ji-yool
- Kim Se-hyun as Cha Woo-bin
- Lee Ha-rin as Lee Young-eun
- Park Hee-von as Lee Ran
- Han Seo-jin as Yoo So-yi
- Kang Sung-pil as Nam Ki-yong
- Han Seung-hyun as Gu Doo-jin
- Seo Yoo-jung as Shin Yeon-hwa
- Yoon Jin-young as Jo Il-yeob
- Choi Go as Han Jin-woo
- Kim Jun-han as Kwak Hyeok-min
- Han Ji-wan as Hong Na-yeo
- Kwon Eun-soo as Kim Han-sook
- Go Geon-han as Kang Soo-ha's son
- Kim Ki-doo as Nam Sang-bok
- Yoo Jung-rae as Lim Si-hyun

=== Guest appearances ===
Season 1
- Kim Seung-yeon as psychic
- Kim Tae-woo as Jae-seok (ep. 1)
- Kim Byung-ok as entertainment company CEO (ep. 2)
- Park No-shik as Choi Kyung-ho (ep. 3)
- Lee Ji-eun as Hong Seong-mi (ep. 3)
- Lim Hwa-young as Yeo-rang (ep. 4)
- Im Je-no as Joon-seo (ep. 5)
- Jung Eun-pyo as gynecologist (ep. 6)
- Lee Dal-hyung (ep. 7)
- Seo Ji-seung as Shi-eun (ep. 8)
- Ahn Yong-joon as Jung Ha-yoon (ep. 9–10)
- Yoo Hae-jung as Eun-ok, abused child
Season 2
- Choi Sang-hak
- Han Yeo-wool
- Han Yeong-gwang as Lee Kyeong-seok
- Lee Kyeong-in as Deok-hoon
- Seo Han-gyeol
- Lee Han-wi as chief of police
- Kim Jong-seok
- Kim Jeong-gyoon
- Kang Seong-min as Jang in-ho (ep. 3)
- Oh Kwang-rok as Boss
- Lee Il-hwa as Hwang Kyu-ri (ep. 5)
- Jeon Moo-song as a priest (ep. 12)
- Park Dae-won
Season 3
- Yoo Jae-myung as Anesthesiologist Lee
- Park Jae-jung as Park Jong-min
- Kim Ga-eun as Yoon So-jung
- Hong So-hee as Shin Hee-soo
- Jung Joon-won as Woo-ram (ep. 4)
- Alexander Lee as Lee Han-seo (ep. 6)
- Yang Ohn-yoo as young Han-seo (ep. 6)
- Choi Ah-ra as Chae-kyung
- Go Kyung-pyo as Seo In-gak (ep. 10–12)
- Kang Bit
- Moon Ji-young as Mi-kyung
- Yoon Joo-hee as Kang Kyung-hee (ep. 12)
Season 4
- Lee Yoo as Min Ji-hee
- Lee Do-yeon as Da-mi
- Jang Seung-jo as Lee Jae-joon
- Lee Soo-yong as Park Jung-wook/Panna Nuen
- Cho Hye-jung as Jung Mi-hyang (ep. 1)
- Kim Jin-geun as Mi-hyang's father (ep. 1)
- Lim Yoon-ho as Ko Kyung-han (ep. 2)
- Park Min-ji as Park Ha-young (ep. 2)
- Song Ji-hyun as Ahn Hee-yeon (ep. 3)
- Hwang Seung-eon as Ahn Hyo-yeon (ep. 3)
- Choi Tae-hwan as Lee Soo-yong (ep. 4)
- Han Ki-won as Hong Ki-joon (ep. 4)
- Kim Heung-soo as Lee Jong-seok (ep. 5)
- Baek Bong-ki as Lee Hwan-seung (ep. 6)
- Kwon Eun-soo as Kim Han-sook (ep. 6)
- Jang Kyung-yeob as Lee Jong-hyuk (ep. 7)
- Seo Woo-jin as Kang Do-jin (ep. 7)
- Ji-soo as Kim Eun-shil (ep. 7)
- Sung Doo-sub as Lee Chul-min (ep. 8)
- Jang Se-hyun as Lee Woo-min (ep. 8)
- Jung So-young as Choi Seo-yeon (ep. 9)
- Kim Bo-mi as Go Gil-nyeo (ep. 10)
- Choi Ho-joong as Park Chan-hyung (ep. 10)
- Yang Geum-seok as Jang Hae-won, Jin-woo's mother (ep. 10–12)
- Choi Cheol-ho as Seo Sang-woo (ep. 11–12)
Season 5
- Lee Sang-yi as Park Jae-sung (ep. 1,2)
- Lee Young-sook as Kim Soo-soon, Jae-sung's mother (ep. 2)
- Jung Myung-joon as Min Byung-tae (ep. 1,2)
- Kim Kyung-min as Jung Chang-man (ep. 2)
- Baek Su-ho as Im Doo-yeon (ep. 3,4)
- Jo Seung-yeon as Lee Jae-hyung (ep. 4)
- Park Se-hyun as Lee Ji-eun (ep. 4)
- Kim Dong-bum as Huh Sang-chan (ep. 3,4)
- Tak Woo-seok as Yoon Hyun-jong (ep. 5,6)
- Seo Yu-jeong as Shin Yeon-hwa (ep. 5,6)
- Han Seung-yong as Hwang Kyung-chul (ep. 5,6)
- Shin Young-eun as Yoon Se-eun (ep. 5,6)
- Jang Won as Kwon Young-pil (ep. 5,6)
- Hong Ji-young as Nam Sang-bok's sister (ep. 7,8)
- Yang Joo-ho as Nam Sang-bok's brother-in-law (ep. 7,8)
- Im Yoo-sung as Kim Seo-joon, Nam Sang-bok's nephew (ep. 7,8)
- Jeon Se-hyeon as Ra Hee-young (ep. 7,8)
- Oh Yoo-jin as Lee Eun-soo (ep. 7,8)
- Jang Won-hyuk as Yang Oh-soo (ep. 8)
- Jung Hye-rin as Oh Soo-young (ep. 8)
- Kang Jae-min as Shin Sun-woo (ep. 9,10)
- Jung Woo-young as Lee Young-rak (ep. 9,10)
- Choi Young-woo as Jeon Du-yeop (ep. 10)
- Kim Do-kyung as Ha Yoon-woo (ep. 10)

=== Character appearances ===
Character	Portrayed by	Series				
Character	Portrayed by	Season 1 (2010)	Season 2 (2011)	Season 3 (2012)	Season 4 (2014)	Season 5 (2018)
Main
Han Jin-woo	Ryu Deok-hwan	Main	Main	Main	Main	Main
Kang Kyung-hee	Yoon Joo-hee	Main	Main	Guest	Main	Main
Jang Kyu-tae	Choi Jung-woo	Main	Main	Main	Guest	Guest
Jo Young-shil	Park Joon-myun	Main	Main	Main	Main	Main
Kim Seong-do	Kim Dae-jin	Main	Main	Main		
Bae Tae-shik	Ahn Nae-sang			Main		
Han Shi-woo	Lee Donghae				Main	
Im Tae-kyung	Kim Jae-kyung				Main	
Jung Seung-bin	Yoon Bo-ra					Main
Moon Soo-an	Park Hyo-joo					Main
Hyeon Sang-pil	Kim Jaewon					Main
Recurring
Go Yoon-jung	Park Da-an	Recurring				
Nam Joo-nam	Kim Geon-woo	Recurring				
Park Seung-wook	Chu Seung-wook	Recurring	Recurring			
Jung Ha-yoon	Ahn Yong-joon	Guest	Recurring			
Min Ji-yool	Lee Seol-hee		Recurring	Guest		
Cha Woo-bin	Kim Se-hyun		Recurring			
Lee Young-eun	Lee Ha-rin		Recurring			
Lee Ran	Park Hee-von			Recurring		
Yoo So-yi	Han Seo-jin			Recurring		
Nam Ki-yong	Kang Sung-pil				Recurring	
Gu Doo-jin	Han Seung-hyun				Recurring	
Jo Il-yeob	Yoon Jin-young				Recurring	
Kwak Hyeok-min	Kim Jun-han					Recurring
Nam Sang-bok	Kim Ki-doo					Recurring
Lim Si-hyun	Yoo Jung-rae					Recurring

== Episodes ==
Quiz of God : South Korea viewers per episode (thousands)

Season	Episode number																Average
Season	1	2	3	4	5	6	7	8	9	10	11	12	13	14	15	16	Average
5	471	669	574	553	542	559	529	505	498	647	498	646	542	541	472	736	561

Source: Audience measurement performed nationwide by Nielsen Media Research.

=== Season 1 (2010) ===
Ep.	Original broadcast date	Title	Rare Disease
1	October 8, 2010	Dracula's Tragedy (드라큘라의 비극)	Porphyria
2	October 15, 2010	The Lost City of Idols (잃어버린 아이돌의 도시)	Guillain-Barré Syndrome
3	October 22, 2010	Assassin (어쌔신)	Lipodysthrophy / Highlander Syndrome
4	October 29, 2010	God's Daughter (신이 내린 딸)	Muscular Dystrophy
5	November 5, 2010	Protein Tracer (단백질 추적자)	Phenylketonuria
6	November 12, 2010	Fan Death (팬 데쓰)	Ovarian Hyperstimulation Syndrome
7	November 19, 2010	Paper Doll (종이인형)	Ehlers-Danlos Syndrome
8	November 26, 2010	Last Present (마지막 선물)	Reflex Asystolic Syncope
9	December 3, 2010	Thanatos (Part 1) (타나토스 1)	Aquagenic Urticaria / Evans Syndrome
10	December 10, 2010	Thanatos (Part 2) (타나토스 2)	Williams Syndrome

=== Season 2 (2011) ===
Ep.	Original broadcast date	Title	Rare Disease
1	June 10, 2011	Wrist Cutting Syndrome (Part 1) (리스트 컷 신드롬 1)	Glanzmann's Thrombasthenia
2	June 17, 2011	Wrist Cutting syndrome (Part 2) (리스트 컷 신드롬 2)	\
3	June 24, 2011	Elephant Man (엘리펀트 맨)	Von Recklinghausen Disease
4	July 1, 2011	Lovesick (Lovesick)	Long QT Syndrome
5	July 8, 2011	The Definition of Psychopath (사이코패스의 정의)	
6	July 15, 2011	Maniac (매니악)	
7	July 22, 2011	A Bomb in My Ears (내 귀에 폭탄)	
8	July 29, 2011	White (화이트)	
9	August 5, 2011	Blood Sale (블러드 세일)	
10	August 12, 2011	Monster (몬스터)	
11	August 19, 2011	The Last Sacred War (Part 1) (마지막 성전 1)	
12	August 26, 2011	The Last Sacred War (Part 2) (마지막 성전 2)	

=== Season 3 (2012) ===
Ep.	Original broadcast date	Title
1	May 20, 2012	Unidentified Organism (미확인 생명체)
2	May 27, 2012	Hospice (호스피스)
3	June 3, 2012	CRPS (CRPS)
4	June 10, 2012	Pits of Hell (지옥도)
5	June 17, 2012	Death Mask (데스마스크)
6	June 24, 2012	Congressman Lee's Murder (이명관 의원 살인사건)
7	July 1, 2012	Toxic Drama (Toxic Drama)
8	July 8, 2012	Spirits of the Dead (원귀)
9	July 15, 2012	Han Jin-woo Syndrome (한진우 신드롬)
10	July 22, 2012	Synapse (시냅스)
11	July 29, 2012	Phantom in the Brain (Part 1) (팬텀 인 더 브레인 1)
12	August 12, 2012	Phantom in the Brain (Part 2) (팬텀 인 더 브레인 2)

=== Season 4 (2014) ===
Ep.	Original broadcast date	Title
1	May 18, 2014	Scarlet Tears (붉은 눈물)
2	May 25, 2014	Angel's Nails (천사의 손톱)
3	June 1, 2014	Serpentine Dance (뱀의 춤)
4	June 8, 2014	One Warm Day (어느 따뜻한 날)
5	June 15, 2014	Dead Man Walking (데드 맨 워킹)
6	June 22, 2014	Modern Times (모던 타임즈)
7	June 29, 2014	X (X)
8	July 6, 2014	Superman (슈퍼맨)
9	July 13, 2014	The Pianist's Lover (피아니스트의 연인)
10	July 20, 2014	God's Proxy (신의 대리인)
11	July 27, 2014	Goodbye Moebius (Part 1) (굿바이 뫼비우스 1)
12	August 3, 2014	Goodbye Moebius (Part 2) (굿바이 뫼비우스 2)

=== Season 5: Reboot (2018–2019) ===
Ep.	Original broadcast date	Title	Ratings
Ep.	Original broadcast date	Title	AGB Nielsen (Seoul)
1	November 14, 2018	The Fire Demon (화마)	1.926%
2	November 15, 2018	The Fire Demon (화마)	2.566%
3	November 21, 2018	Mad World (매드 월드)	2.009%
4	November 22, 2018	Mad World (매드 월드)	2.215%
5	November 28, 2018	Hope for Heaven (천국을 찾아서)	2.178%
6	November 29, 2018	Hope for Heaven (천국을 찾아서)	2.259%
7	December 5, 2018	The New Narcissism (뉴 나르시시즘)	2.126%
8	December 6, 2018	The New Narcissism (뉴 나르시시즘)	2.352%
9	December 12, 2018	A Single Moon (하나의)	2.096%
10	December 13, 2018	A Single Moon (하나의)	2.610%
11	December 19, 2018	Remember (Remember)	2.428%
12	December 20, 2018	Remember (Remember)	2.509%
13	January 2, 2019	Just... (Just...)	2.007%
14	January 3, 2019	Just... (Just...)	2.233%
15	January 9, 2019	Only One (Only One)	2.184%
16	January 10, 2019	Only One (Only One)	2.688%
Average			2.274%

== International broadcast ==
The first three seasons aired in Japan on BS-Japan, and the fourth season aired on DATV starting from December 16, 2014.

It latter confirmed to be remake as Quiz From God for Amazon Prime Video.
