= Kim Dae-jin =

Kim Dae-jin may refer to:

- Kim Dae-jin (pianist) (born 1962), South Korean pianist
- Kim Dae-jin (actor) (born 1977), South Korean actor
