= Jeon Yeo-been =

South Korean actress (born 1989)

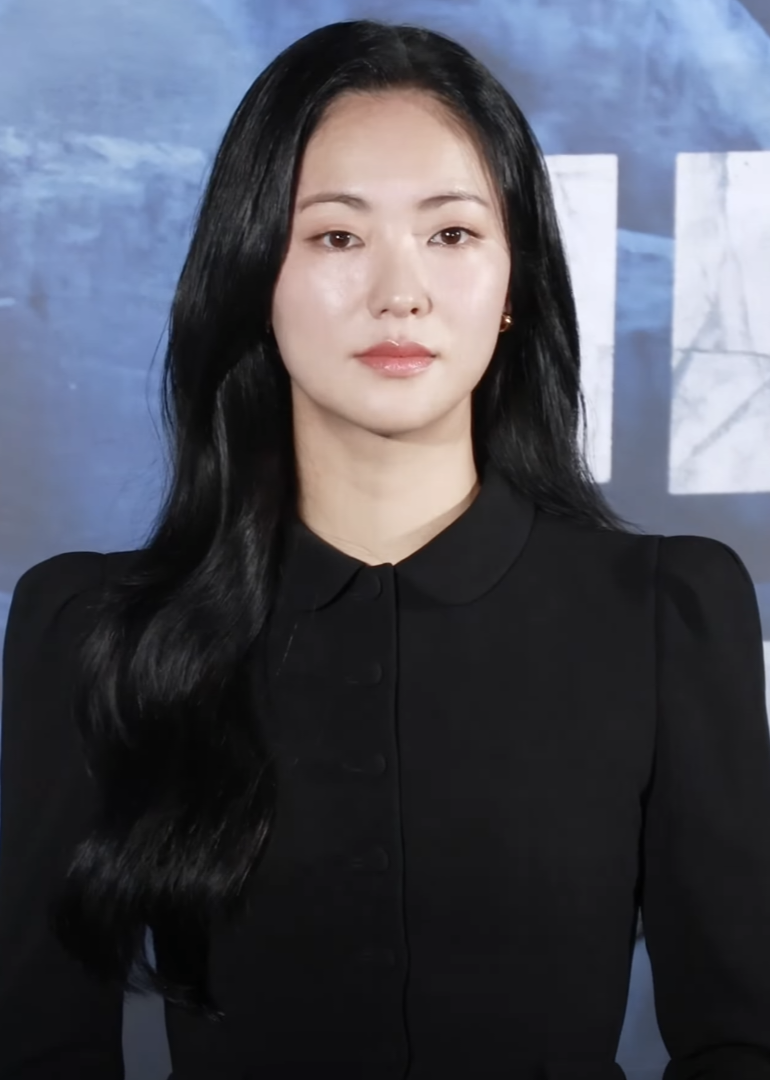
- Jeon in November 2024
- Born: Jeon Bo-young; July 26, 1989 (age 37); Gangneung, Gangwon Province, South Korea
- Education: Dongduk Women's University
- Occupation: Actress
- Years active: 2015–present
- Agent: Management MMM

Korean name
- Hangul: 전여빈
- RR: Jeon Yeobin
- MR: Chŏn Yŏbin

Former name
- Hangul: 전보영
- RR: Jeon Boyeong
- MR: Chŏn Poyŏng

Jeon Yeo-been (Korean: 전여빈; born Jeon Bo-young on July 26, 1989) is a South Korean actress. She rose to prominence with her performance in the independent film After My Death (2018), for which she received the Actress of the Year Award at the 22nd Busan International Film Festival and the Independent Star Award at the 2017 Seoul Independent Film Festival. Her subsequent work includes the television series Vincenzo (2021), A Time Called You (2023), Our Movie (2025), and Ms. Incognito (2025), the film Night in Paradise (2021), and the movie Dark Nuns(2025).

== Early life and education ==
Jeon graduated from a non-standardized high school in Gangneung. She initially aspired to a career as medical doctor during her school years. After failing to gain admission to her intended university, she shifted her focus to filmmaking. This decision to pursue this new path was influenced by watching the film Dead Poets Society.

For a month, Jeon persuaded her family to allow her to attend an acting academy in Seoul. She subsequently enrolled in Dongduk Women's University's Department of Broadcasting and Entertainment. In 2009, while diligently studying at the university, she decided to pursue acting. She participated in her college musical, Lunatic, portraying a grandmother with dementia. Jeon considers this specific role to be her debut acting work and attributes significant personal importance to the experience.

== Career ==
=== Beginning and breakthrough roles ===
After graduation, Jeon worked as a staff member for musicals and theatrical productions in Daehangno, taking on roles such as assistant director and ticket agent to learn about theater from the outside. Despite appearing steadily in independent films, she remained largely unknown. While contemplating her future as an actress, she received a fortuitous opportunity when actress Moon So-ri saw her in a trailer for the Seoul International Women's Film Festival and contacted her to appear in the short film she directed, The Running Actress.

Following this, her older brother, a photographer who actively supported her career, took a profile picture of her and posted it on social media. A film executive happened to see the photo and offered Jeon an audition, which led to her commercial film debut in the period drama The Treacherous.

In 2015, seeking representation, she visited Director Jang Jin's production company, "Film Issuda," and boldly proposed, "If you need an actress, think of me." She had already worked on the staff of one of Jang Jin's plays for about six months, making the agency's staff familiar with her. Jeon's confident approach led left a lasting impression on Jang Jin, and Jeon was cast in his TV film The Sea We Wished For (2015). This was followed by appearances in Kim Soo-hyun's independent film Beaten Black and Blue (2016) and independent films Write or Dance (2017), which premiered at Seoul Independent Film Festival on December 2016.

In the autumn of 2016, Jeon auditioned for and successfully landed a title character in Director Kim Ui-seok's film After My Death. The filming took place in the winter of the same year. Jeon portrayed Young-hee, who becomes the prime suspect in the presumed suicide of her missing friend, Kyung-min (Jeon So-nee). Facing accusations and relentless bullying without support, Young-hee attempts to find the truth but ultimately chooses to commit suicide herself.

The year 2017 marked a significant turning point in Jeon's career. Having previously planned to retire from acting if she did not achieve success by the age of 29, she saw After My Death as her last chance, which motivated her to dedicate herself intensely to the project. The film premiered at the 22nd Busan International Film Festival (BIFF) in October 2017, where Jeon immediately won the Actress of the Year Award. Her acclaimed performance continued to earn recognition, including the Independent Star Award at the Seoul Independent Film Festival and Rookie Award at the 2018 Marie Claire Film Festival.

Even before the BIFF premiere of After My Death, Jeon had already attracted attention from other projects. Independent films Write or Dance (2017) was released in theater on August 3, 2017. She also joined the cast of the television series Save Me, starring Ok Taec-yeon and Seo Yea-ji, which ran on OCN from August 5 to September 24, 2017. Her portrayal of Hong So-rin, a Muji Ilbo reporter who bravely infiltrates the Guseonwon religious cult, garnered significant praise. Moreover, her prior short film, The Best Director, was re-released as Act 3 of the anthology feature The Running Actress, a collection of three shorts all directed by Moon So-ri, further raising her industry profile after its September 13, 2017, release.

Jeon's career continued to ascend in 2018. She was featured in a music video for ballad singer Yoon Jong-shin, and on July 2, she signed an exclusive contract with J.Wide Company. Following the general theatrical release of After My Death on September 13, 2018, Jeon secured more accolades, including the Best New Actress Award at the 56th Grand Bell Awards.

=== Transition to leading roles ===
In 2019, Jeon starred in her first main television lead role in the romantic comedy series Be Melodramatic, directed by Lee Byeong-heon. She played Lee Eun-jung, a documentary director who is the CEO and sole employee of her production company. Her character suffers from persistent complex grief disorder following the death of her boyfriend, with whom she often imagines conversing. This situation leads her best friends, Lim Jin-joo (Chun Woo-hee) and Hwang Han-joo (Han Ji-eun), as well as her brother Lee Hyo-bong (Yoon Ji-on), to move into her house. The series aired on the cable network JTBC from August 9 to September 28. Although it received low viewership ratings, it developed a strong cult following.

In 2020, Jeon was cast in Park Hoon-jung's film Night in Paradise. The film premiered at the 77th Venice International Film Festival on September 3, 2020, where it was screened in the "Out of Competition" category. Due to the COVID-19 pandemic, the film bypassed a theatrical release and instead debuted on Netflix on April 9, 2021. Jeon portrayed Kim Jae-yoon, a terminally ill woman living in Jeju who is drawn into conflict after encountering Tae-goo (portrayed by Uhm Tae-goo), a man pursued by Director Ma (portrayed by Cha Seung-won) of the Bukseong gang.

In August 2020, Jeon officially confirmed her appearance in mini-series Vincenzo, a project that teamed-up director Kim Hee-won and screenwriter Park Jae-beom. This marked Jeon's second collaboration Ok Taec-yeon, with whom she had previously worked on Save Me (2017). Starring Song Joong-ki as italian mafia of Korean-descent Vincenzo, the series aired on tvN every Saturday and Sunday from February 20 to May 2, 2021. It was also made available for streaming on Netflix. Jeon portrayed Hong Cha-young, a fiercely intelligent lawyer. Seon Hyeon-seon from Top Class noted that Hong Cha-young's intensity was conveyed through her "devil's tongue" and "witch's tenacity."

On March 15, 2021, Jeon was cast in the Netflix original series Glitch, directed by Roh Deok. She portrayed Hong Ji-hyo, a woman searching for her missing boyfriend, Lee Si-kook (Lee Dong-hwi). As she searches, she attempts to uncover the truth behind a mysterious secret with the help of a community of UFO watchers member Heo Bo-ra (Nana). The series was released on Netflix on October 7, 2022.

On February 11, 2022, it was confirmed that Jeon was cast in Kim Jee-woon's film Cobweb.The film premiered in the non-competitive section at the 2023 Cannes Film Festival. The film was released theatrically on September 27, 2023, coinciding with Korean Chuseok holidays. She portrayed Shin Mi-do, the head of finance at a film production company. For her performance, Jeon received the award for Best Supporting Actress at the 44th Blue Dragon Film Awards, and was also nominated for Best Supporting Actress for the 59th Grand Bell Awards.

Her next work was A Time Called You, a time-travel mystery romance television series written by Choi Hyo-bi and directed by Kim Jin-won, co-starring Ahn Hyo-seop, and Kang Hoon. The series is based on the Taiwanese television series Someday or One Day. It was released on Netflix on September 8, 2023. Jeon played two roles: Han Jun-hee, the girlfriend of the deceased Yeon-jun who mourns his death, and Kwon Min-ju, the girl whose body Han Jun-hee ends up in after traveling back in time.

== Filmography ==
=== Film ===
Acting credit in feature film(s)
Year	Title	Role	Notes	Ref.
2015	The Treacherous	Woman with queen's fate	Bit part	
2016	Age of Shadows	Gisaeng 4	Bit part	
2016	Beaten Black and Blue	Tiffany		
2017	Write or Dance	Yeo Been		
2017	Merry Christmas Mr. Mo	Ja-yeong		
2018	Illang: The Wolf Brigade	Cosmetics advertising model	Cameo	
2018	After My Death	Young-hee		
2019	Forbidden Dream	Sa-im		
2020	Secret Zoo	Kim Hae-kyung		
2020	Night in Paradise	Jae-yeon		
2022	Alienoid	Hong Eon-nyeon	Cameo	
2023	Cobweb	Shin Mi-do		
2024	Harbin	Gong Boo-in		
2025	Dark Nuns	Sister Michaela		

=== Short film ===
Acting credit in short film(s)
Year	Title	Role	Notes	Ref.
2012	Bulchuibulgui			
2014	Living as a Trainee in Korea			
2014	The Work Waiting for You			
2015	The Sea I Wish For	Jong-soon	UHD Film	
2015	Yours	Yeo-been		
2015	MAHNG	Yeo-been		
2015	Humanity! I love you, don't cry!			
2015	Bear Girl	Ung-nyeo		
2016	The Purpose of Art	Nu-ri		
2016	My Sister Died	Woo-joo		
2017	The Running Actress; Act 3 – The Best Director	Lee Seo-yeong	Filmed in 2015	
2017	Distance to Her	Yeo-been		
2017	Ride Together	Mysterious woman		

=== Television series ===
Year	Title	Role	Notes	Ref.
2017	Save Me	Hong So-rin		
2018	Live	Yeong-jae	Cameo (Episode 1)	
2019	Be Melodramatic	Lee Eun-jung		
2021	Vincenzo	Hong Cha-young		
2022	Glitch	Hong Ji-hyo		
2023	A Time Called You	Han Jun-hee / Kwon Min-ju		
2025	Our Movie	Lee Da-eum		
2025	Ms. Incognito	Kim Young-ran / Bu Se-mi		

=== Web series ===
Year	Title	Role	Notes	Ref.
2017	Private But Good Day 2	Jo-hee	Episode 3	

=== Music video appearances ===
Music video appearances
Year	Song title	Artist	Ref.
2015	"Pride and Prejudice" (오만과 편견)	Zico	
2015	"Home"	Brown Eyed Soul	
2015	"Boombox"	45RPM	
2016	"Solji" (솔지) (Hukky Shibaseki remix)	Jang Gyu	
2016	"Summer cold" (여름감기)	Voice Spur	
2016	"Just bye" (그저 다 안녕)	Lee Seung-hwan	
2017	"Time to become an adult" (어른이 될 시간)	Rooftop Moonlight	
2018	"Into the Light"	Solid	
2018	"Farewell talk" (이별톡)	Yoon Jong-shin	
2021	"Foolish Love" (바라만 본다)	MSG Wannabe	
2021	"Only You" (나를 아는 사람)	MSG Wannabe	

== Hosting ==
Year	Title	Notes	Ref.
2022	Opening ceremony 27th Busan International Film Festival	with Ryu Jun-yeol	

== Accolades ==
=== Awards and nominations ===
Awards and nominations received by Jeon
Award	Year	Category	Nominee / Work	Result	Ref.
APAN Star Awards	2022	Best Couple	Jeon Yeo-been with Song Joong-ki; Vincenzo	Nominated	
Asia Artist Awards	2021	Best Artist Award – Actress	Jeon Yeo-been	Won	
Asia Artist Awards	2021	Female Actress Popularity Award	Jeon Yeo-been	Nominated	
Baeksang Arts Awards	2019	Best New Actress – Film	After My Death	Nominated	
Baeksang Arts Awards	2020	Best New Actress – Television	Be Melodramatic	Nominated	
Baeksang Arts Awards	2025	Best Supporting Actress – Film	Dark Nuns	Nominated	
Blue Dragon Film Awards	2018	Best New Actress	After My Death	Nominated	
Blue Dragon Film Awards	2021	Best Actress	Night in Paradise	Nominated	
Blue Dragon Film Awards	2021	Popular Star Award	Night in Paradise	Won	
Blue Dragon Film Awards	2023	Best Supporting Actress	Cobweb	Won	
Blue Dragon Film Awards	2025	Best Supporting Actress	Dark Nuns	Nominated	
Blue Dragon Series Awards	2023	Best Actress	Glitch	Nominated	
Buil Film Awards	2019	Best New Actress	After My Death	Won	
Buil Film Awards	2021	Best Actress	Night in Paradise	Nominated	
Buil Film Awards	2025	Best Supporting Actress	Dark Nuns	Nominated	
Busan Film Critics Awards	2018	Best New Actress	After My Death	Won	
Busan International Film Festival	2017	Actress of the Year	After My Death	Won	
CGV Art House Special Awards	2019	Special Award of the Year	After My Death	Won	
Chunsa Film Art Awards	2019	Best New Actress	After My Death	Won	
Chunsa Film Art Awards	2023	Best Supporting Actress	Cobweb	Nominated	
Cine21 Film Awards	2018	Best New Actress	After My Death	Won	
Director's Cut Awards	2023	Best Actress in Television	Glitch	Nominated	
Director's Cut Awards	2024	Best Actress in Film	Cobweb	Nominated	
Film Award of the Year	2019	Discovery of the Year	After My Death	Won	
Golden Cinematography Awards	2025	Best Actress Award	Dark Nuns	Won	
Grand Bell Awards	2020	Best New Actress	After My Death	Won	
Grand Bell Awards	2023	Best Supporting Actress	Cobweb	Nominated	
Kinolights Awards	2021	Actress of the Year (Domestic)	Night in Paradise and Vincenzo	3rd	
Korea Best Star Awards	2018	Best New Actress	After My Death	Won	
Marie Claire Film Festival	2018	Best Rookie Award	After My Death	Won	
Marie Claire Film Festival	2023	Radiance Award	Jeon Yeo-been	Won	
OBS Hot Icon Awards (Note: OBS Hot Icon Awards is an entertainment popularity award given by OBS Gyeongin TV since 2013.)	2021	OBS 2021 Hot Icon Trend	Jeon Yeo-been	Won	
SBS Drama Awards	2025	Excellence Award, Actress in a Seasonal Drama	Our Movie	Won	
Seoul Independent Film Festival	2017	Independent Star Award	After My Death	Won	
Seoul International Drama Awards	2021	Outstanding Korean Actress	Vincenzo	Nominated	
Wildflower Film Awards	2019	Best Actress	After My Death	Nominated	
2nd D Awards	2026	D Awards Impact	Ms. Incognito	Won	

=== Listicles ===
Name of publisher, year listed, name of listicle, and placement
Publisher	Year	Listicle	Placement	Ref.
Cine21	2016	Rising Stars	Placed	
Cine21	2024	"Korean Film NEXT 50" – Actors	Placed	
