= Our Movie =

2025 South Korean television series

- Promotional poster
- Hangul: 우리 영화
- RR: Uri yeonghwa
- MR: Uri yŏnghwa
- Genre: Melodrama
- Written by: Han Ga-eun; Kang Kyung-min
- Directed by: Lee Jung-heum
- Starring: Namkoong Min; Jeon Yeo-been; Lee Seol; Seo Hyun-woo
- Music by: Kim Tae-seung
- Country of origin: South Korea
- Original language: Korean
- No. of episodes: 12

Production
- Executive producers: Lee Seul-gi (CP); Shin Min-cheol; Jo Seong-hoon
- Producers: Park Seon-ah; Yoon Yoon-sun; Hong Seong-chang; Jeong A-reum
- Production companies: Studio S; Beyond J

Original release
- Network: SBS TV
- Release: June 13 – July 19, 2025

Our Movie (Korean: 우리 영화) is a 2025 South Korean melodrama television series directed by Lee Jung-heum, written by Han Ga-eun and Kang Kyung-min, and starring Namkoong Min, Jeon Yeo-been, Lee Seol, and Seo Hyun-woo. It aired on SBS TV from June 13, to July 19, 2025, every Friday and Saturday at 21:50 (KST).

== Synopsis ==
The series is about a film director and an aspiring actress who are both dealing with personal health issues, feel their time is running out, and attempt to heal their wounds. As the two work together filming, they start to fall in love with each other.

== Cast and characters ==
- Namkoong Min as Lee Je-ha

A film director.

- Jeon Yeo-been as Lee Da-eum

An aspiring actress.

- Lee Seol as Chae Seo-young

The prominent actress who took the world of cinema and advertising by storm.

- Seo Hyun-woo as Boo Seung-won

A producer.

== Production ==
=== Development ===
The series was produced by Studio S and Beyond J.

=== Casting ===
On July 2, 2024, 935 Entertainment told Newsen that they're positively reviewing their client Namkoong Min's appearance. The next day, Jeon Yeo-been was reportedly cast as the female lead. According to a SPOTV News report on August 20, Lee Seol has confirmed her appearance. On September 27, the production team of the series announced that Namkoong and Jeon had confirmed their appearances. On December 16, Xports News reported that Seo Hyun-woo had confirmed his appearance.

== Original soundtrack ==
=== Part 1 ===
Released on June 14, 2025
No.	Title	Writer(s)	Artist	Length
0.	Untitled	CIFIKA
1.	"MiMi"		CIFIKA	4:38
2.	"MiMi" (Inst.)			4:38
Total length:				9:16

=== Part 2 ===
Released on June 20, 2025
No.	Title	Lyrics	Music	Length
1.	"Let Her Stay"	4BOUT	4BOUT; Hwan; KIME	4:20
2.	"Let Her Stay" (Inst.)		4BOUT; Hwan; KIME	4:20
Total length:				8:40

=== Part 3 ===
Released on June 21, 2025
No.	Title	Lyrics	Music	Length
1.	"Piece of Me"	Sam Ock	Sam Ock	4:40
2.	"Piece of Me" (Inst.)		Sam Ock	4:40
Total length:				9:20

=== Part 4 ===
Released on June 28, 2025
No.	Title	Lyrics	Music	Length
1.	"Unknown"	Seo Ja-young	Huze; Seo Ja-young; Ha Hyeong-eon	3.18
2.	"Unknown" (Inst.)		Huze; Seo Ja-young; Ha Hyeong-eon	3:18
Total length:				6:26

=== Part 5 ===
Released on July 4, 2025
No.	Title	Lyrics	Music	Length
1.	"Picture Perfect"	sh	sh	3.18
2.	"Picture Perfect" (Inst.)		sh	3:18
Total length:				6:26

=== Part 6 ===
Released on July 5, 2025
No.	Title	Lyrics	Music	Length
1.	"Panorama Love"	Lee Jung-jae	Lee Jung-jae; Sine-wav	3.10
2.	"The arrow and the song"		Lee Jung-jae	2:56
Total length:				6:05

=== Part 7 ===
Released on July 12, 2025
No.	Title	Lyrics	Music	Length
1.	"Love Me More"	Lee Jung-jae	Lindy Robbins; Scott Quinn; Ruxley	3.24
2.	"Love Me More" (Inst.)		Lindy Robbins; Scott Quinn; Ruxley	3:24
Total length:				06:48

== Release ==
Our Movie was initially scheduled for cable channel tvN, but moved to terrestrial broadcast SBS TV. The series was then scheduled to premiere on the network on June 13, 2025, and airs every Friday and Saturday. It is also available on Disney+ in selected markets.

== Viewership ==
Our Movie : South Korea viewers per episode (thousands)

Season	Episode number												Average
Season	1	2	3	4	5	6	7	8	9	10	11	12	Average
1	739	541	687	615	646	571	618	609	634	651	591	756	638

Source: Audience measurement performed nationwide by Nielsen Media Research.

Average TV viewership ratings
Ep.	Original broadcast date	Average audience share (Nielsen Korea)	
Ep.	Original broadcast date	Nationwide	Seoul
1	June 13, 2025	4.2% (11th)	4.5% (9th)
2	June 14, 2025	3.0% (16th)	3.3% (12th)
3	June 20, 2025	4.0% (14th)	3.9% (15th)
4	June 21, 2025	3.4% (15th)	3.4% (14th)
5	June 27, 2025	3.7% (13th)	3.9% (9th)
6	June 28, 2025	3.2% (15th)	3.6% (9th)
7	July 4, 2025	3.6% (15th)	4.0% (12th)
8	July 5, 2025	3.3% (14th)	3.8% (6th)
9	July 11, 2025	3.8% (15th)	4.0% (11th)
10	July 12, 2025	3.9% (11th)	4.5% (6th)
11	July 18, 2025	3.5% (13th)	3.9% (12th)
12	July 19, 2025	4.1% (12th)	4.4% (9th)
Average		3.6%	3.9%
In the table above, the blue numbers represent the lowest ratings and the red numbers represent the highest ratings.
