= Ms. Incognito =

2025 South Korean television series

- Promotional poster
- Also known as: The Good Woman Bu Se-mi
- Hangul: 착한 여자 부세미
- RR: Chakhan yeoja Bu Semi
- MR: Ch'akhan yŏja Pu Semi
- Genre: Crime; Romance; Thriller; Revenge
- Written by: Hyun Gyu-ri
- Directed by: Park Yoo-young
- Starring: Jeon Yeo-been; Jinyoung; Jang Yoon-ju; Joo Hyun-young; Seo Hyun-woo
- Country of origin: South Korea
- Original language: Korean
- No. of episodes: 12

Production
- Executive producers: Kim Hyun-jung (CP); Choi Han-gyul; Hyunwoo Thomas Kim; Kim Jin-yi
- Producers: Kim Eun-sun; Yoon Chang-woo
- Running time: 60 minutes
- Production companies: Kross Pictures; Trii Studio

Original release
- Network: ENA; Genie TV
- Release: September 29 – November 4, 2025

Ms. Incognito (Korean: 착한 여자 부세미) is a 2025 South Korean crime romantic drama television series directed by Park Yoo-young and written by Hyun Kyu-ri. Produced under Kross Pictures and Trii Studio, it stars Jeon Yeo-been, Jinyoung, Jang Yoon-ju, Joo Hyun-young and Seo Hyun-woo. It aired on ENA from September 29, to November 4, 2025, every Monday and Tuesday at 22:00 (KST).

== Synopsis ==
A poor female bodyguard, dreaming of having a room of her own, enters into a contract marriage with a terminally ill chaebol chairman. For three months, she must change her identity and survive while evading those scheming to seize her vast inheritance.

== Cast ==
=== Main ===
- Jeon Yeo-been as Kim Young-ran / Bu Se-mi

A bodyguard who marries the Ga Seung-ho to protect his fortune and uses a new name to move to a safer place

- Jinyoung as Jeon Dong-min

A single father and strawberry farm owner who begins to doubt Young-ran's identity

- Jang Yoon-ju as Ga Seon-yeong

Ga Seung-ho's stepdaughter who does everything to benefit herself, she is behind his daughter's death

- Joo Hyun-young as Baek Hye-ji
- Seo Hyun-woo as Lee Don

Ga Seung-ho's personal lawyers and his assistants

=== Supporting ===
- Lee Chang-min as Ga Seon-woo
- Seo Jae-hye as Lee Mi-seon
- Kim Jae-hwa as Butler Choi
- Lee Jin-hee as shin Jeong-hwa

=== Special appearances ===
- Moon Sung-keun as Ga Seong-ho.

The chairman of a wealthy business group who begs Young-ran to marry him to protect his fortune

== Production ==
=== Development ===
The series was officially commissioned by KT Studio Genie, with Park Yoo-young serving as director and the script is penned by Hyun Kyu-ri, while Kross Pictures and Trii Studio managed the production.

=== Casting ===
From October 2024 to March 2025, South Korean news outlets reported that Jeon Yeo-been, Jinyoung, Jang Yoon-ju, Joo Hyun-young and Seo Hyun-woo were offered roles in the series and were positively reviewing them.

=== Filming ===
Principal photography of the series took place in 2025.

== Release ==
The first images from the first script reading were released on August 26, 2025. The series premiered on ENA on September 29, 2025, airing every Monday and Tuesday at 22:00 (KST).

== Viewership ==
Ms. Incognito : South Korea viewers per episode (millions)

Season	Episode number												Average
Season	1	2	3	4	5	6	7	8	9	10	11	12	Average
1	0.524	0.870	1.103	1.186	1.392	1.320	1.268	1.262	1.299	1.137	1.392	1.638	1.283

Source: Audience measurement performed nationwide by Nielsen Korea.

Average TV viewership ratings
Ep.	Original broadcast date	Average audience share	
Ep.	Original broadcast date	(Nielsen Korea)	
Ep.	Original broadcast date	Nationwide	Seoul
1	September 29, 2025	2.408% (3rd)	2.301% (3rd)
2	September 30, 2025	4.015% (2nd)	3.694% (2nd)
3	October 6, 2025	4.504% (2nd)	4.309% (2nd)
4	October 7, 2025	5.068% (2nd)	4.561% (2nd)
5	October 13, 2025	5.919% (1st)	5.544% (1st)
6	October 14, 2025	5.791% (1st)	5.459% (1st)
7	October 20, 2025	5.649% (2nd)	5.086% (2nd)
8	October 21, 2025	5.604% (2nd)	5.278% (2nd)
9	October 27, 2025	5.735% (2nd)	4.961% (2nd)
10	October 28, 2025	5.119% (2nd)	4.620% (2nd)
11	November 3, 2025	6.262% (1st)	6.190% (1st)
12	November 4, 2025	7.127% (1st)	7.092% (1st)
Average		5.183%	4.842%
In the table above, the blue numbers represent the lowest ratings and the red numbers represent the highest ratings.
