= Glitch (South Korean TV series) =

2022 South Korean television series

- Promotional poster
- Hangul: 글리치
- RR: Geullichi
- MR: Kŭllich'i
- Genre: Science fiction; Mystery; Thriller
- Created by: Netflix
- Written by: Gin Han-sai
- Directed by: Roh Deok
- Starring: Jeon Yeo-been; Nana
- Music by: Kang Ki-young
- Country of origin: South Korea
- Original language: Korean
- No. of episodes: 10

Production
- Executive producer: Yoon Shin-ae
- Producer: Greg Lee
- Cinematography: Kim Jung-won
- Camera setup: Multi-camera
- Running time: 60 minutes
- Production company: Studio 329

Original release
- Network: Netflix
- Release: October 7, 2022

Glitch (Korean: 글리치) is a 2022 South Korean science fiction television series written by Gin Han-sai, directed by Roh Deok, and starring Jeon Yeo-been and Nana, it tells the story of a young woman who tries to track down her missing boyfriend with the help of a UFO-watching club. It was released on Netflix on October 7, 2022.

== Synopsis ==
Hong Ji-hyo comes from a rich family. She has a steady job, obtained through family connections. One night, her boyfriend of four years suddenly disappears. As she goes in search of him, she tries to uncover the truth behind a mysterious secret with the help of a community of UFO watchers, including Heo Bo-ra.

== Cast and characters ==
=== Main ===
- Jeon Yeo-been as Hong Ji-hyo
  - Shin Rin-ah as young Hong Ji-hyo
- Nana as Heo Bo-ra
  - Jo Ye-rin as young Heo Bo-ra

=== Supporting ===
- Lee Dong-hwi as Lee Si-kook, Hong Ji-hyo's boyfriend
- Jeon Bae-soo as Hong Jong-sik, Hong Ji-hyo's father
- Ryu Kyung-soo as Kim Byung-jo, a police officer
- Lee Min-goo as Dong-hyuk, a high school student and a member of the UFO community
- Park Won-seok as Cho Phillip, a member of the UFO community
- Tae Won-seok as Captain Prince, a member of the UFO community
- Baek Joo-hee as Seo Hwa-jeong, Value Real Estate
- Jung Da-bin as Kim Young-gi, New Beginnings Peace Corps
- Ko Chang-seok as Kim Chan-woo, Divine Light Church member
- Kim Ja-young
- Kim Gook-hee as Goo Hye-yeon, stepmother of Ji-hyo
- Park Soo-young as Kwon Young-woong
- Kim Nam-hee as Ma Hyung-woo, a psychiatrist who helps Ji-hyo
- Choi Soo-im as Oh Se-hee, Hong Ji-hyo's friend.
- Park Sung-yeon as Choi Seong-joo, former police officer

== Production ==
=== Development ===
On December 30, 2020, Netflix confirmed through a press release that it would distribute a Korean original series titled Glitch, to be produced by Studio 329 and written by Extracurricular writer, Gin Han-sai.

Jeon Yeo-been was offered the lead role in early March. In mid-March, director Roh Deok and Jeon Yeo-been confirmed they had joined the series. On March 19, 2021, Nana was confirmed to play the role of a twitch streamer on the show.

=== Filming ===
On July 23, 2021, filming was temporarily halted due to the COVID-19 pandemic and one of the performers possibly being infected. Filming resumed on May 21, 2021, and continued until December 23. On May 28, 2021, images from a script-reading location were revealed.

== Episodes ==
No. overall	No. in season	Title	Directed by	Written by	Original release date
1	1	"Episode 1"	Roh Deok	Gin Han-sai	October 7, 2022
2	2	"Episode 2"	Roh Deok	Gin Han-sai	October 7, 2022
3	3	"Episode 3"	Roh Deok	Gin Han-sai	October 7, 2022
4	4	"Episode 4"	Roh Deok	Gin Han-sai	October 7, 2022
5	5	"Episode 5"	Roh Deok	Gin Han-sai	October 7, 2022
6	6	"Episode 6"	Roh Deok	Gin Han-sai	October 7, 2022
7	7	"Episode 7"	Roh Deok	Gin Han-sai	October 7, 2022
8	8	"Episode 8"	Roh Deok	Gin Han-sai	October 7, 2022
9	9	"Episode 9"	Roh Deok	Gin Han-sai	October 7, 2022
10	10	"Episode 10"	Roh Deok	Gin Han-sai	October 7, 2022

== Release ==
The series had its premiere at the 27th Busan International Film Festival, in the 'On Screen' section, on October 6, 2022. Four episodes out of ten were introduced in the premiere. It became available for streaming on Netflix on October 7, 2022.

== Reception ==
=== Critical response ===
On the review aggregator website Rotten Tomatoes, 67% of 6 critics' reviews are positive, with an average rating of 6.8/10.

=== Accolades ===
Year	Award	Category	Nomination	Result	Ref.
2023	Director's Cut Awards	Best Director	Roh Deok	Nominated	
2023	Director's Cut Awards	Best Screenplay	Gin Han-sai	Nominated	
2023	Director's Cut Awards	Best Actress	Jeon Yeo-been	Nominated	
2023	2nd Blue Dragon Series Awards	Best Actress	Jeon Yeo-been	Nominated	
