= Write or Dance =

- Theatrical poster
- Hangul: 여자들
- RR: Yeojadeul
- MR: Yŏjadŭl
- Directed by: Lee Sang-deok
- Written by: Lee Sang-deok
- Produced by: Park Je-young
- Starring: Choi Si-hyung
- Cinematography: Lee Han-kyeol; Lee Jong-wook
- Edited by: Yoon Dong-kyu
- Music by: Kim Dong-hwan
- Production company: Mustache Film
- Distributed by: Indiestory
- Release dates: December 2016 (Seoul Independent Film Festival); August 3, 2017 (South Korea)
- Running time: 101 minutes
- Country: South Korea
- Language: Korean

Write or Dance (Korean: 여자들; RR: Yeojadeul; lit. '"Women"') is a 2016 South Korean drama film directed by Lee Sang-deok.

== Production ==
The movie was filmed from May 2015 to early 2016 for 8 months. The idea of the movie was initially started as a conversation between actor Choi Si-hyung who was a friend of the director, who tried to do something fun together.The shooting for the film was done in a monthly basis, where the staff filmed one chapter once per month.The difference in Sihyung's haircut was intentionally shown to show the pass of time. Some of the lines are quotes from Haruki Murakami and Osamu Dazai.The title of the film was initially not set and there were several working titles before they ended with the current title.

== Music ==
The music director Kim dong hwan described the music used for the film intended to provide jazz music with the atmosphere of a little girl.

== Plot ==
The story of an aspiring novelist who experiences special meetings with different individuals, on a particular day of every month.

== Cast ==
- Choi Si-hyung as Si-hyung
- Jeon Yeo-been as Yeo-been
- Chae Seo-jin as Go-un
- Yozoh as Su-jin
- Yoo I-deun as I-deun
- Jeon So-nee as So-ni
