= Vincenzo (TV series) =

2021 South Korean television series

- Official promotional poster
- Hangul: 빈센조
- RR: Binsenjo
- MR: Pinsenjo
- Genre: Crime drama; Black comedy; Romance
- Created by: Studio Dragon
- Screenplay by: Park Jae-beom
- Directed by: Kim Hee-won; Ham Seung-hoon
- Starring: Song Joong-ki; Jeon Yeo-been; Ok Taec-yeon; Kim Yeo-jin; Kwak Dong-yeon
- Composer: Park Se-joon
- Country of origin: South Korea
- Original languages: Korean; English; Italian; Mandarin
- No. of episodes: 20

Production
- Executive producer: Cho Moon-joo
- Producers: Lee Jang-soo; Jang Sai-jung (Note: Vice-president for video contents at Logos Film's parent company); Ham Seung-hoon; Cho Soo-young
- Camera setup: Single-camera
- Production company: Logos Film
- Budget: ₩20 billion (~USD 18 million)

Original release
- Network: tvN
- Release: February 20 – May 2, 2021

Vincenzo (Korean: 빈센조; RR: Binsenjo) is a 2021 South Korean television series starring Song Joong-ki as the title character, alongside Jeon Yeo-been, Ok Taec-yeon, Kim Yeo-jin, and Kwak Dong-yeon. It aired on TvN from February 20 to May 2, 2021. It is also available for streaming on Netflix.

The first episode reached a 7.7% rating (AGB nationwide), making it the fourth highest-rated tvN drama premiere. The final episode received a 14.6% rating, making it the eighteenth highest-rated drama in Korean cable television history. It also made the series the sixth highest-rated drama in tvN's history.

The series was also popular among international viewers through Netflix, maintaining its position in the top 10 TV shows on Netflix in the world since its start and reached the fourth rank on April 26. It ranked fourth on Forbes list of most-viewed Korean series on Netflix in 2021.

== Synopsis ==
At the age of eight, Park Joo-hyung is adopted by an Italian family, but the family later dies tragically in an accident. Joo-hyung joins the mafia and is adopted by Don Fabio, the head of the Cassano Family who treats him like a son. Renamed as "Vincenzo Cassano", he becomes a lawyer, a consigliere for the mafia, and Don Fabio's right-hand man. After Fabio died, Paolo, Fabio's biological son and the new leader of the Cassano Family, attempts to kill his adoptive brother out of jealousy as Fabio favoured Vincenzo over himself.

Vincenzo flees to Seoul and sets out to recover a gold bullion worth ₩150 billion ($110 million) that he helped his business partner (a recently dead Chinese tycoon) secretly stash within a hidden basement under Geumga Plaza, a commercial building in South Korea. During an inspection of the building, he discovers that he needs to demolish the place to retrieve the buried gold. However, a subsidiary of a large pharmaceutical corporation Babel Group has illegally taken ownership of the building with the intention of demolishing it to build a business building. Unwilling to let the gold to fall into the hands of Babel Group, Vincenzo must use his skills to reclaim the building and recover his fortune.

Among the quirky tenants at Geumga Plaza is the Jipuragi Law Firm run by Hong Yoo-chan, in which Vincenzo finds he has aligned interests. At first he comes into conflict with Hong Yoo-chan's daughter, Hong Cha-young, an attorney for a rival firm, Wusang, that defends Babel Group. Under the orders of Babel's top legal advisor, Hong Yoo-chan is murdered in the middle of the street. Enraged, Cha-young angrily resigns from her firm and takes over Jipuragi and teams up with Vincenzo to take down Babel. It is revealed that Hong Yoo-chan is killed because he managed to discover that Babel Group is a shell company for a drug cartel and left some clues for his daughter and Vincenzo to find.

When Vincenzo finds himself getting entangled in a bigger issue with Babel internally, he realizes that conventional legal method cannot do anything against a powerful corporation like Babel, and uses skills he learned in the mafia to fight the corporation, including kidnapping and torturing Babel employees for intel, as well as recruiting the tenants from Geumga Plaza to help him. He also starts persuading mistreated employees of Babel to be their allies to destroy the Corporation from within. Eventually, Vincenzo manages to find a way into the gold vault underneath the building without having to demolish it. Aside from the gold, he stumbles upon a USB left behind by his deceased business partner called the Guillotine file containing incriminating pieces of evidence against Korean politicians, civil servants, and the Babel Group. As both the corrupt politicians and Babel Group find out about the Guillotine file, they seek to obtain and destroy it while Vincenzo dodges their attacks by staying several steps ahead of them.

== Cast ==
=== Main ===
- Song Joong-ki as Vincenzo Cassano / Park Joo-hyung
  - Kim Si-woo as young Vincenzo

An Italian lawyer and mafia consigliere of Korean descent, the adoptive son of the late boss of the Cassano Family, and the true owner of Geumga Plaza. He becomes an advisor and foreign legal counsel at Jipuragi Law Firm, working with Hong Cha-young to destroy the Babel Group and reclaim the gold hidden in Geumga Plaza.

- Jeon Yeo-been as Hong Cha-young

A lawyer who is an associate for the Wusang Law Firm and Hong Yoo-chan's daughter. She is energetic and tends to overreact. She later replaces her father as CEO of Jipuragi Law Firm and joins Vincenzo in his revenge against Babel. She is also Vincenzo's love interest.

- Ok Taec-yeon as Jang Jun-woo / Jang Han-seok
  - Moon Seong-hyun as young Jang Han-seok

An intern in Wusang Law Firm working under Hong Cha-young as her paralegal and assistant, and the real Chairman of Babel Group. He puts on a front as a happy-go-lucky, dumb, and naive man. However, he is revealed as the true power behind Babel Group.

- Kim Yeo-jin as Choi Myung-hee

A former prosecutor who quits the prosecutor's office to join Wusang Law Firm as its new Senior Partner, and in the process becomes the corporate fixer and attorney of Babel Group. She appears to good-natured and enjoys Zumba dancing, but in reality, she is extremely corrupt and is Jang Jun-woo's accomplice in his schemes. She is responsible for ordering the death of Cha-young's father.

- Kwak Dong-yeon as Jang Han-seo

Jang Jun-woo's half-brother and the previous chairman's illegitimate son who publicly acts as the owner of Babel Group in his brother's place. He appears to be rude, cocky and pretentious, but he is actually more morally equipped than his brother.

=== Supporting ===
Wusang Law Firm

- Jo Han-chul as Han Seung-hyuk

The CEO of Wusang Law Firm who recruits Choi Myung-hee into the group. He eventually becomes the Chief of the Seoul Southeast District Prosecutors' Office.

Geumga Plaza

- Yoon Byung-hee as Nam Joo-sung

A paralegal working at Jipuragi Law Firm under lawyer Hong Yoo-chan and later Hong Cha-young. He is a former special effect make-up artist. After Hong Yoo-chan's death, he joins Vincenzo and Hong Cha-young in destroying the Babel Group.

- Choi Young-joon as Cho Young-woon

The manager of Geumga Plaza, whose name is used in its deed. Vincenzo once saved his life back in Milan, and becomes indebted to him. It is later revealed that he is an undercover agent of the International Security Intelligence Service, but he remains as an ally to Vincenzo.

- Choi Deok-moon as Tak Hong-shik

A laundromat owner. He purposely ruins Vincenzo's limited edition bespoke suit because he thought that Vincenzo wants to evict him and the other tenants. He was a former gang member and uses scissors as his weapon.

- Kim Hyung-mook as Toto

An Italian restaurant owner in Geumga Plaza and former wrestler. He pretends to have studied in Italy to be a chef and feels threatened by Vincenzo who easily learns his secret.

- Lee Hang-na as Kwak Hee-soo

A snack bar owner in Geumga Plaza and former boxer. She regularly beats her son who secretly smokes.

- Kim Seol-jin as Larry Kang

A dance studio owner in Geumga Plaza and former street fighter. He is a clean-freak and hates it when people makes his studio dirty.

- Kim Yoon-hye as Seo Mi-ri

A piano school owner in Geumga Plaza who has a crush on Vincenzo. She is a hacker who designed the security of the gold vault. She narrowly escaped the assassination and moved to Geumga Plaza to keep an eye on the gold.

- Yang Kyung-won as Lee Chul-wook

A self-proclaimed expert martial artist and pawnshop owner in Geumga Plaza. He often talks big about beating up opponents but he chickens out.

- Seo Ye-hwa as Jang Yeon-jin

Lee Chul-wook's wife and former gold medal weight lifter. She berates her husband when he shows false bravado.

- Kang Chae-min as Kim Young-ho

Kwak Hee-soo's son, who secretly smokes with his friends against his mother's wishes.

- Ri Woo-jin as Jeokha

The abbot of Nanyak Pagoda in Geumga Plaza. He felt a strong presence of Buddha under the place he usually sits because of a golden statue of Buddha stashed under there. He gives Vincenzo advice on how to deal with his problems and insecurities.

- Kwon Seung-woo as Chaeshin

A monk assisting Jeokha. He is close to the other tenants and acts as an advisor.

Ant Financial Management

- Kim Young-woong as Park Seok-do

The CEO of Ant Financial Management. He is a gangster who worked for Babel Group. He was in charge of Geumga Plaza's demolition, but moves into the plaza after nearly being killed by Babel and starts a business called ByeBye Balloon. He eventually helps Jipuragi in their fight against the Babel Group.

- Lee Dal as Jeon Soo-nam

An employee of Ant Financial Management. He is a gangster and Park Seok-do's second-in-command. He joins his boss in helping Jipuragi fight the Babel Group.

- Jung Ji-yoon as Yang Joo-eun

An accountant of Ant Financial Management (and later for ByeBye Balloon) who has a crush on Vincenzo. She helps Jipuragi fight Babel Group.

International Security Intelligence Service

- Im Chul-soo as Ahn Gi-seok

The team leader of the Italian Organized Crime Division of the International Security Intelligence Service. He goes undercover to spy on Vincenzo by becoming a protégé under Chef Toto.

- Kwon Tae-won as Tae Jong-gu

The director of the International Organized Crime Bureau under the International Security Intelligence Service. He initially disapproves of Ahn Gi-seok's plan to launch an operation to spy on Vincenzo, but eventually helps Gi-seok and Jipuragi.

Seoul Southeast District Prosecutors' Office

- Seo Jin-won as Hwang Jin-tae

The chief of the Seoul Southeast District Prosecutors' Office and Choi Myung-hee's former boss. He is on Babel Group's payroll after being blackmailed.

- Hwang Tae-kwang as Seo Woong-ho

The deputy chief of Seoul Southeast District Prosecutors' Office. He was murdered by Jang Han-seok.

- Go Sang-ho as Jung In-kook

A prosecutor from Seoul Southeast District Prosecutors' Office. He works with Cho Young-woon to obtain the Guillotine File and helps Vincenzo fight against Babel Group.

Cassano family

- Salvatore Alfano as Paolo Cassano

Vincenzo's adoptive brother and the new leader of the Cassano family. He tries to have Vincenzo killed out of resentment, but fails, causing Vincenzo to flee to South Korea. He later helps both Choi Myung-hee and Han Seung-hyuk in trying to kill and frame Vincenzo, but also fails.

- Luca Vaquer as Luca

Vincenzo's personal driver and assistant. He works for the Cassano family and is more loyal to Vincenzo, and updates him about the current affairs in Italy.

Others

- Yoon Bok-in as Oh Gyeong-ja

A former maid accused of murdering the late CEO of Shinkwang Bank and Hong Yoo-chan's client. It is later revealed that she is Vincenzo's birth mother.

- Hong Seo-jun as Gil Jong-moon

The director of the hospital owned by Babel Group. He was later murdered by a killer sent by Jang Han-seok.

- Jung Wook-jin as Lee Seon-ho

One of the test subjects for the drug RDU-90. He is a whistleblower for Babel Pharmaceuticals.

- Na Chul as Naa Deok Gin
- Lee Do-guk as Hwang Gyu

Choi Myung-hee's former enforcer (and later Vincenzo's enforcer) who arranged Hong Yoo-chan's murder. He used to work for the Korean Military's Intelligence Division. He was later killed by Vincenzo after exceeding his usefulness.

- Kim Tae-hoon as Pyo Hyuk-pil

Choi Myung-hee's former enforcer, who later becomes Vincenzo's enforcer, who works under Hwang Gyu. He also used to work for the Korean Military's Intelligence Division.

=== Special appearances ===
- Jin Seon-kyu as an unnamed robber #1 (ep. 1)

Acting as a limousine taxi driver.

- Lee Hee-joon as an unnamed robber #2 (ep. 1)
- Jung Soon-won as an airport police (ep. 1)
- Yoo Jae-myung as Hong Yoo-chan (eps. 1-3)

A lawyer who was the CEO of the Jipuragi Law Firm and Chairman of the Development Opposition Committee for Geumga Plaza, Yoo-chan is Cha-young's father. He believes that justice is above all else and would never compromise his principles, and he was a mentor-like figure to Vincenzo. He was later killed under Choi Myung-hee's orders, inspiring his daughter Hong Cha-young to take revenge against the Babel Group.

- Kim Jin-yi as a past client (eps. 4–5)
- Shin Seung-hwan as So Hyun-woo (ep. 5)

A corrupt attorney on Wusang Law Firm's payroll.

- Jeong Yeong-ju as a lady driving out of the court (ep. 5)
- Cha Soon-bae as Judge Heo (ep. 6)
- Ahn Chang-hwan as Gilbeot

A homeless man staying outside Geumga Plaza. Misunderstood by everyone as "Gilbert", he tries to correct his name to clarify them. He tells Vincenzo that Gilbeot means "a friend on the road." (eps. 6–7, 12)

- Yoo Yeon as Kim Yeo-won (ep. 7)

Gil Jong-moon's wife and the head of Sungwon University Hospital's Pediatric Cancer Center.

- Kim Byung-ji as the coach of youth football team (ep. 7)
- Kim Sung-cheol as Hwang Min-sung (eps. 8, 20)

The CEO of Shinkwang Bank.

- Im Chae-moo as an employee of Moomoo Land (ep. 8)
- Jeon Gook-hyang as Seo Young-sun (eps. 8, 20)

Hwang Min-sung's mother and the chairwoman of Shinkwang Finances.

- Nichkhun and Hwang Chan-sung (ep. 12)

The lead stars of UCN drama "The Age of Stray Dogs and Wild Dogs".

- Yoon Kyung-ho as Nam Shin-bae (ep. 13)

The chairman of the Babel Guardian Committee Union.

- Jeon Jin-oh as Park Chan-gi (ep. 13)
- Lee Hye-jung as Jung Do-hee (eps. 14–15)

The director of Ragusang Gallery.

- Keum Gwang-san as Keum Gwang-jin (ep. 14)
- Jeon Jin-gi as Oh Jung-bae (ep. 15)

The CEO of Daechang Daily.

- Lee Geung-young as Park Seung-joon (ep. 17)

A presidential candidate.

- Yoo Tae-woong as Kim Seok-woo (eps. 17–20)

Park Seung-joon's secretary and Han Seung-hyuk's senior.

== Episodes ==
No.	Title	Directed by	Written by	Original release date	South Korea viewers (millions)
1	"Episode 1"	Kim Hee-won	Park Jae-bum	February 20, 2021	1.948
Vincenzo Cassano is the adopted son of Fabio, the don of the Cassano family. He is trusted by his adoptive father and in turn hated by his adopted brother, Paolo. When Fabio dies, Vincenzo takes it upon himself to execute his last word and sets fire to the vineyard of a rival mafia head. Paolo tries to assassinate Vincenzo and fails. Vincenzo warns Paolo by blowing up his car and leaves Italy for Korea. In Korea, Geumga Plaza is the last standing residential commercial building that is not acquired by the Babel Group. The owner, Mr. Cho, is the right-hand man of Vincenzo. Years ago, Vincenzo and Mr. Cho helped a Chinese tycoon to hide 1.5 tons of illegal gold under the plaza. Now the tycoon is dead, and the gold can only be retrieved by demolishing the structure. In the meantime, righteous lawyer Hong Yoo-chan represents innocent drug testers in a lawsuit against Babel Pharmaceuticals. Hong Cha-young, his daughter, is the defendant's lawyer, from the Wusang Law Firm. She bribes a key witness and wins the case.
2	"Episode 2"	Kim Hee-won	Park Jae-bum	February 21, 2021	2.389
As the Babel Group acquired Geumga Plaza forcefully by threatening Mr. Cho, in order to demolish the building and build Babel Tower, tenants are forced to leave the building. Vincenzo promises Yoo-chan that he'll get the building back. Yoo-chan doubts him at first but later joins hands with him to save the building. Han Seung-hyuk recruits Choi Myung-hee into Wusang. One of the researchers at Babel Pharmaceuticals runs away and contacts Yoo-chan to reveal the truth about Babel's drug development. Ant Company sets a date to start the demolition of the Plaza. Cha-young rushes to the Plaza as her father doesn't move out of the building on the day of demolition.
3	"Episode 3"	Kim Hee-won	Park Jae-bum	February 27, 2021	2.098
Vincenzo throws a large-scale party at Geumga Plaza on the very day of demolition even with the presence of Italian Ambassador, making it impossible to start the demolition. Tenants of the Plaza begin to have trust in Vincenzo. Ahn Gi-seok starts working at Chef Toto's to spy on Vincenzo. Cha-young tries her best to find the runaway researcher before he blows the whistle, but he reveals to Hong Yoo-chan that Babel's new drug RDU-90 is not a painkiller but a narcotic drug and that multiple test subjects have died during its experiments. Vincenzo manages to halt the demolition for 2 months by blackmailing the manager of Babel's Investment and Development Team. Hong Yoo-chan tries to convince Cha-young that Babel is developing a narcotic drug but she doesn't believe him. Employees of Babel's Drug Development Division are killed in a gas explosion done by Jang Han-seo. In order to prevent the truth about Babel's new drug coming to light, Choi Myung-hee's enforcers kill the runaway researcher and runs a truck over Yoo-chan when he is having a drink with Vincenzo at a street-corner bar.
4	"Episode 4"	Kim Hee-won	Park Jae-bum	February 28, 2021	2.587
Cha-young arrives at the bar and finds her father lying on the ground with a pool of blood next to his head. An unconscious Vincenzo is rushed to the hospital, while Yoo-chan is pronounced dead at the scene. While reporting Yoo-chan's death, the news accuses him for violating attorneys-at-law act. Yoo-chan's past clients mourn his death and leave flowers the outside of the Jipuragi office in note of gratitude. Vincenzo wakes up. Cha-young resigns from the Wusang Law Firm, suspecting them for the death of her father. She decides to reopen Jipuragi Law Firm. Jang Han-seo finds a pillow drenched in red with dozens of needles sticking out of it on his bed. Han Seung-hyuk and Myung-hee report to Han-seo that they suspect Cha-young is and Han-seo orders to put her behind bars. Cha-young is arrested, but is quickly released after Vincenzo provides CCTV footage as her alibi. Cha-young suggests Vincenzo that she can help him get Geumga Plaza back. They decide to work together against Babel and Wusang. They capture Myun-hee's enforcers who are responsible for Yoo-chan's death and set fire to a Babel Pharmaceuticals warehouse.
5	"Episode 5"	Kim Hee-won	Park Jae-bum	March 6, 2021	2.447
Real boss of Babel (Han-seo's "Hyungnim") is revealed to be Wusang's intern Jang Joon-woo. Cha-young and Vincenzo decide to target Babel Chemicals as their next step. Vincenzo meets Han-seo at gym and figures out he is not the real boss of Babel, after having a brief conversation with him. Myun-hee feels fishy about Vincenzo and visits Jipuragi Law Firm to check him out in person. Han Seung-hyuk reluctantly promotes Jang Joon-woo to a partner at Wusang by Han-seo's orders. Cha-young and Vincenzo study lawsuit filed by employees of Babel chemicals who have been exposed to harmful chemical called BLSD and get diagnosed with leukemia. Lawyer of victims is working for Wusang and convinces the victims to settle. Cha-young and Vincenzo try to persuade the victims to fight against Babel instead of settling but they believe they can never win against Babel. Monk Chaesin's friend who works at Babel Chemicals also gets hospitalized due to BLSD. After successfully persuading the victims, Jipuragi takes on the lawsuit and Cha-young and Vincenzo attend the court as the representative of the victims while Myun-hee, Seung-hyuk and Joon-woo represent Babel Chemicals.
6	"Episode 6"	Kim Hee-won	Park Jae-bum	March 7, 2021	2.893
7	"Episode 7"	Kim Hee-won	Park Jae-bum	March 13, 2021	2.429
8	"Episode 8"	Kim Hee-won	Park Jae-bum	March 14, 2021	2.755
9	"Episode 9"	Kim Hee-won	Park Jae-bum	March 20, 2021	2.364
10	"Episode 10"	Kim Hee-won	Park Jae-bum	March 21, 2021	3.024
11	"Episode 11"	Kim Hee-won	Park Jae-bum	March 27, 2021	2.439
12	"Episode 12"	Kim Hee-won	Park Jae-bum	March 28, 2021	2.840
13	"Episode 13"	Kim Hee-won	Park Jae-bum	April 3, 2021	2.871
Mr. Cho held Vincenzo up at gunpoint. Snatching the gold bar holding the Guillotine File, he takes off. However, Vincenzo took the gun, knock down Cho and gain the upper-hand. It turns out Cho is actually a corporate spy and works for an International Crime Bureau. Meanwhile, Han-seok leads the Babel group in their plans going forward. Only, they're interrupted by Director Tae Jong-Gu of the International Organized Crime Bureau showing up – the same organization Cho works for. En-route to the hot springs, the group change their minds and head back to Geumga Plaza. Cha-Young calls and lets Cho and Vincenzo know they're back. They both kick everything back down the hole. They manage it just in time as the residents scramble back to the plaza. When the members leave, Vincenzo and Cho both breathe a sigh of relief. Only, they suddenly realize, that they've left the iris device in the jacket, which is now inside the vault. Meanwhile, Babel group weigh up their options regarding the Guillotine file. There's some very incriminating files on there that could cause a lot of problems for them if it leaks out. After the Babel meeting, Han-Seok speaks to Seung-Hyeok in private, confronting him about the misfortune and how none of Seung-Hyeok's ideas have worked. Seung-Hyeok proposes that he should act like an idiot again. Han-Seo takes this advice. Meanwhile, Cha-Young and Vincenzo try to find some evidence to use against Babel – which includes setting their sights on the Vision Team. Their plan includes finding out who the company Union leader is. The Geumga Plaza residents, grab the union leader, taking him away by the docks. The Union leader calls and tells Chan-Ki to bring him two billion won in a days' time or he'll disclose everything they've been up to. Han-seok shows up at the prosecution office. They want to oust Han-seok as the one giving the orders behind the anti-union activities. Vincenzo and Cha- Young took the files, and Han-seok doesn't know this. Vincenzo heads in to the big press conference. Vincenzo and the gang have intercepted the press conference with footage of the Vision Leader confirming that the Chairman ordered these anti-union measures. Han-seok is now bathed in pig's blood.
14	"Episode 14"	Kim Hee-won	Park Jae-bum	April 4, 2021	2.884
Prosecutor Jung In-look takes Han-seok in his custody. Han-seo tries to take the blame on himself in an attempt to prove his loyalty. However, Ms Choi has a better trick up her sleeve. Chief Prosecutor Hwang Jin-tae comes to Han-seok’s rescue and blames Babel employees for conspiring to frame the Chairman because they weren’t happy with the leadership change.He asks prosecutor Jung to begin his investigations again. However, Vincenzo and Cha Young planned this all along.They wanted to use their target on The Vision team and anti-union documents as a decoy so that they could focus on their main target- Han-seok’s illegal paper companies. Han Seo meets up with Vincenzo, offering to help him in killing his brother, but Vincenzo refuses. With the help of Byebye Ballon and Geumga Plaza occupants, Vincenzo figures out that one of Han-seok’s paper companies is running as an art gallery. It is also revealed that Seo Mi-ri is the hacker who designed the security of the gold vault below Nanyak temple. She escaped assassination and set up shop in Geumga plaza to keep an eye on the gold. She confronts the Jipuragi team and tells them she can open the vault. Vincenzo and Cha Young go undercover as a couple to the art gallery to uncover money laundering evidence with the help of the Geumga plaza residents. Their mission is successful. Meanwhile, Ms Choi has brought someone in from Italy to get rid of Vincenzo once and for all.
15	"Episode 15"	Kim Hee-won	Park Jae-bum	April 10, 2021	2.628
16	"Episode 16"	Kim Hee-won	Park Jae-bum	April 11, 2021	2.754
Oh Jung-bae is killed by three people hired by a lawyer at Wusang on behalf of Han-seok and Myung-hee. They attempt to frame Vincenzo, who escapes from the police and finds the true killers with help from the employees of ByeBye Balloon and Tak Hong-shik. The killers and the man who hired them are arrested. As a return favour for their help, ByeBye Balloon takes promotional images of Vincenzo. Vincenzo and Cha-Young take Oh Gyeong-ja out for a day, where they take pictures and go for a walk outside. Mother and son have a heart-to-heart, but neither admits to their relationship to one another out loud. At Geumga Plaza, a person dressed as a gas inspector cuts the gas pipe in the snack bar. The fire brigade arrives and Vincenzo manages to throw the device intended to set the gas alight outside, saving the plaza. Han-seo reveals to Vincenzo and Cha-young that he is the one who called in the tip to the fire brigade. Vincenzo decides to visit his mother but arrives at the hospital to find that she has been murdered. With Ahn Gi-seok's help, Vincenzo locates his mother's murderer, chases him to Han-seok's property and kills the murderer in front of Han-seok, Han-seo, Myung-hee and Seung-hyuk. He promises to come for them soon, firing a parting shot at Han-seok.
17	"Episode 17"	Kim Hee-won	Park Jae-bum	April 24, 2021	2.719
A funeral is held for Oh Gyeong-ja. A party is held for the corrupt officials bidding on office space inside Babel Tower. Residents from Geumga Plaza infiltrate the event as various support staff. After the bidding closes, one of Myung-hee's former "crystal balls" appears with bombs strapped to his chest, saying that he has been threatened and that if the assembled members do not agree to tear up their contracts and cut ties with Babel group, the room will be blown up by a bomb in a cake. As a show, he indicates that a model of Babel Tower will explode, but is instead himself blown up by Vincenzo. Cha-young is horrified by this but reaffirms her commitment to getting revenge on the men who killed her father. The officials at the party receive text messages telling them to tear up and eat the contracts, announcing who they are, which they do. The doors to the room are opened and the assembled guests flee. The timer on the cake reaches zero and a spray of liquid is emitted rather than an explosion. The second "crystal ball" finds Myung-hee but is later killed by her. Han-seo and Vincenzo play hockey together and Han-seo gives Vincenzo some inside information. Residents from Geumga Plaza threaten the officials at the party with video footage of the event. Seung-hyuk arranges a meeting with Park Seung-joon and informs him of the location of the Guillotine file. A second party is held with corrupt officials at Han-seok's home. Director Tae is working with Vincenzo and is recording this meeting. Kim Seok-woo (on advice from Candidate Park) promotes Seung-hyuk to Chief Prosecutor of Namdongbu and re-instates Han-seo as chairman of Babel Group. A trap is set for Vincenzo by Myung-hee and Seung-hyuk with Paolo, with Interpol arriving at the ice rink where Vincenzo and Han-seo are playing. Han-seo appears to shoot Vincenzo in the shoulder.
18	"Episode 18"	Kim Hee-won	Park Jae-bum	April 25, 2021	3.109
Han-seo tells Han-seok, Myung-hee and Seung-hyuk what happens at the ice rink, saying that the agents are overpowered by Vincenzo's men who were already at the rink. The officers were then taken to a warehouse where the Interpol officers were killed and the Korean officers were threatened. Han-seo was let off with a parting shot. This is later shown to be a fabrication - Han-seo and Vincenzo planned the whole thing: the police officers were sent off with evidence of bribery and corruption by Paolo and the Jason Fund. Officials who were present at the party at Han-seok's home are gathered, where a clip recorded by Director Tae is played aloud. Vincenzo and Cha-young file a lawsuit alleging that the approval process for Babel Tower was corrupt. Vincenzo meets with Chief Prosecutor Han and threatens him to find a reason to send Han-seok to prison. Han-seok is attacked in his home. Cho Young-woon is kidnapped by Kim Seok-woo to find the person who built the security system for the vault underneath Geumga Plaza. Han-seok is sent to jail for his own safety, where he is visited by Vincenzo who reveals that he is like a sated cat playing with Han-seok. Luca arrives in Korea, informing Vincenzo that he is needed to save the Cassano family back in Italy from the Luciano family. Vincenzo prepares to leave Korea for two weeks. Kim Seok-woo finds out that it was Seo Mi-ri who designed the vault and forces her to open it. They find out that the vault is empty when they open it. Seo Mi-ri flees and is saved from Kim Seok-woo's goons by the timely arrival of Vincenzo.
19	"Episode 19"	Kim Hee-won	Park Jae-bum	May 1, 2021	3.075
Vincenzo is overpowered by Kim Seok-woo's goons, but the residents of Geumga Plaza arrive. It is revealed that many of them have skills in fighting and eventually subdue all of the goons. The gold had been removed by Vincenzo - the monks reveal that they know about the vault but not its contents, so with their and Seo Mi-ri's help, the gold had been moved already. Vincenzo reveals that he did not leave Korea but instead paid the Lucianos to leave them alone. At the trial of Geumga Plaza Residents vs Babel Tower, Vincenzo is called by Cha-young as the first witness and shows the video from the two parties, with Han-seo, Han-seok, Myung-hee and Seung-hyuk's faces blurred out. The approvals for Babel Tower are overturned. Vincenzo tells Han-seo that he should leave the country for his safety, but Han-seo refuses. Myung-hee fabricates evidence that she was the one who set Han-seok up, which allows her and Han-seok to swap places in prison. Prosecutor Jung is celebrating his promotion when he is confronted by Vincenzo on the balcony, who kills him and makes it look like a suicide. Cha-young heads to a law school get-together, where she is kidnapped by Han-seok. Han-seok then kidnaps Han-seo as well. Vincenzo receives a package with the jewellery he purchased for Cha-young covered in blood. Han-seo and Cha-young wake up at Han-seok's home. Han-seok calls Vincenzo, informing him of where they are. Vincenzo arrives. Han-seok tells Han-seo that if he kills Vincenzo, he will be allowed to live. Han-seo lunges at Han-seok instead, giving Vincenzo enough time to free Cha-young and attempt to escape. Han-seok shoots at Vincenzo but hits Cha-young instead.
20	"Episode 20"	Kim Hee-won	Park Jae-bum	May 2, 2021	3.841
After shooting Cha-young, Han-seok sees an opportunity to shoot and effectively murder Vincenzo once and for all, but at the last second, Han-seo grabs the gun and points it at himself, prompting Han-seok to shoot his brother before escaping while Vincenzo acknowledges Han-seo as the latter dies. Later, Vincenzo looks after a recovering Cha-young at the hospital. Elsewhere on the next day, Seung-hyuk, ordered by Vincenzo, releases Myung-hee from prison in exchange for his life being spared but Han-seok learns of this deal and has Seung-hyuk killed regardless. However, Myung-hee and Han-seok are both being tracked and tailed, with Myung-hee being cornered by Vincenzo in her apartment, tied to a chair with mangled feet, sprayed with fuel and burnt to death. Meanwhile, Han-seok and his men are confronted by the Geumga Plaza tenants, and while Chul-wook is stabbed, Han-seok is eventually knocked out, enabling Vincenzo to capture him. Vincenzo explains that Han-seo's critical thinking before his death allowed Vincenzo to hunt him down, afterwards revealing a drill that would gradually impale his body before leaving him to die. Before Vincenzo escapes Korea for his crimes, Mr. Cho and Gi-seok, bid him goodbye, as do Cha-young and Joo-sung afterwards. As a year passes, and the new Cassano family has moved on with their lives, both collectively and individually; Chul-wook survived the stabbing, Mr. Cho and Gi-seok search for Vincenzo globally, Cha-young wins Geyong-ja's posthumous retrial, and Geumga Plaza tenants protest against a greedy political candidate. Cha-young attends a diplomatic Italian celebration, where she briefly reunites with Vincenzo. The series closes with Vincenzo monologuing that in a world where evil is rampant, justice alone won't defeat villains, and oftentimes ruthlessness is necessary to rid the world of them.

== Production ==
In May 2020, director Kim Hee-won and screenwriter Park Jae-bum teamed up for Vincenzo. In July 2020, it was reported that Song Joong-ki and Jeon Yeo-been are considering the offer to star in the series; while Ok Taec-yeon was confirmed for the cast. Song and Jeon confirmed their appearance in the following month. The first script reading took place on January 5, 2021.

The series was planned to be partially shot in Italy but due to the COVID-19 pandemic, related scenes were augmented with CGI.

Episodes 17 and 18 were delayed one week due to the production team wanting to "improve the quality" of the episodes.

== Original soundtrack ==
Vincenzo OST

Soundtrack album by Various artists
- Released: May 2, 2021
- Genre: Soundtrack
- Length: 2:41:00
- Languages: Korean; English; Italian
- Labels: Genie Music; Stone Music Entertainment

=== Vincenzo (Original Television Soundtrack) ===
Tracklist

No.	Title	Artist	Length
1.	"Ombra mai fu"	Choi Sung-hoon (La Poem)	3:01
2.	"Adrenaline (Italian ver.)"	Aalia	3:27
3.	"Adrenaline"	Solar (Mamamoo)	3:27
4.	"Lacrimosa"	La Poem	3:48
5.	"Is This Love"	Aalia	3:37
6.	"I'm Always By Your Side"	John Park	3:51
7.	"Questo edificio è mio"	Song Jin-seok	2:14
8.	"Night Of Sicily"	Song Jae-kyung; Park Se-jun	3:03
9.	"Mafia"	Kim Min-ji; Park Se-jun	3:33
10.	"The Last Of Babel"	Lee Nyeom	2:55
11.	"Appearance(SHOW TIME)"	Na Sang-jin; Park Se-jun	1:51
12.	"For The Justice"	Woo Ji-hun; Park Se-jun	2:15
13.	"Jifuragi"	Na Sang-jin; Park Se-jun	1:58
14.	"Stopped Time"	Woo Ji-hun; Park Se-jun	3:40
15.	"Un diavolo scaccia l'altro"	Lee Nyeom	2:48
16.	"Addio"	Na Yoon-sik; Park Se-jun	3:15
17.	"If You Want"	Kim Dong-hyeok	1:32
18.	"Aspettate"	Woo Ji-hun; Park Se-jun	1:50
19.	"Holy Anger"	Na Sang-jin; Park Se-jun	2:45
20.	"Is This Love (Guitar Ver.)"	Kim Tae-hwan; Park Se-jun	2:08
21.	"Booty"	Woo Ji-hun; Park Se-jun	1:58
22.	"Finestra di espiazione"	Kim Ji-ae; Park Se-jun	3:07
23.	"Retributor"	Lee Nyeom; Park Se-jun	2:11
24.	"Lombirghini"	Song Jin-seok; Park Se-jun	2:12
25.	"Dark Side Of Me"	Na Sang-jin; Park Se-jun	2:05
26.	"A Silent Cry"	Na Yoon-sik; Park Se-jun	2:41
27.	"Corn Salad"	Kim Tae-hwan; Park Se-jun	1:58
28.	"Country Of KIMCHI"	Yoo Hee-hyeon; Park Se-jun	1:29
29.	"Vincenzo The Phoenix"	Kim Dong-hyeok	1:58
30.	"Hold back"	Yoo Hee-hyeon; Park Se-jun	1:44
31.	"Bead"	Kim Ji-ae; Park Se-jun	2:11
32.	"Secret Weapon"	Woo Ji-hun; Park Se-jun	1:50
33.	"I'm Sorry I Didn't Know"	Woo Ji-hun; Park Se-jun	2:07
34.	"Chaos KEUMGA Plaza"	Song Jae-kyung; Park Se-jun	2:21
35.	"Il male è grande e vasto"	Na Sang-jin; Park Se-jun	2:34
36.	"Is This Love (Piano Ver.)"	Kim Tae-hwan; Park Se-jun	2:05
37.	"Two Idiots"	Yoo Hee-hyeon; Park Se-jun	1:55
38.	"Bungeoppang With My Mom"	Song Jin-seok; Park Se-jun	2:18
39.	"Doomsday"	Kim Dong-hyeok; Choi Moon-seok	2:14
40.	"Baksumudang Vincezo"	Yoo Hee-hyeon; Park Se-jun	0:50
41.	"Zumba Dance"	Woo Ji-hun; Park Se-jun	2:04
42.	"Through The Years"	Song Jin-seok; Park Se-jun	2:12
43.	"Mom's Letter"	Kim Min-ji; Park Se-jun	2:36
44.	"Your Vacancy"	Lee Nyeom	3:30
45.	"Exhale"	Kim Dong-hyeok; Choi Moon-seok	3:09
46.	"Why Are You Standing There"	Yoo Hee-hyeon; Park Se-jun	1:34
47.	"Never felt better"	Yoo Hee-hyeon; Park Se-jun	1:17
48.	"Lawyer Nem"	Song Jae-kyung; Park Se-jun	2:01
49.	"Happily Today As Well"	Na Yoon-sik; Park Se-jun	1:34
50.	"Empty Mind"	Kim Min-ji; Park Se-jun	3:32
51.	"Inzaghi"	Song Jae-kyung; Park Se-jun	2:24
52.	"Anxious Monk"	Kim Tae-hwan; Park Se-jun	1:47
53.	"Cavalleria Rusticana"	Pietro Mascagni	3:32
54.	"Fish-shaped Buns And Carp-shaped Buns"	Na Yoon-sik; Park Se-jun	1:32
55.	"Unmatched cuteness"	Kim Min-ji; Park Se-jun	1:25
56.	"SShabala"	Song Jin-seok; Park Se-jun	1:59
57.	"March of The Priests"	Wolfgang Amadeus Mozart	2:47
58.	"Pasta Party"	Na Yoon-sik; Park Se-jun	1:18
59.	"It Smells Bad Somewhere"	Kim Tae-hwan; Park Se-jun	2:07
60.	"Nabucco Hebrew Slaves Chorus"	Giuseppe Verdi	3:54
61.	"Chaconne Sorro"	Song Jae-kyung; Park Se-jun	2:56
62.	"Where Is My Gold"	Song Jin-seok; Park Se-jun	2:45
63.	"Vincenzo Theme But Gisuk Theme"	Na Yoon-sik; Park Se-jun	2:33
64.	"Operation Start"	Na Yoon-sik; Park Se-jun	2:01
65.	"Escape From Us"	Song Jin-seok; Park Se-jun	2:19
66.	"RDU-90"	Kim Min-ji; Park Se-jun	1:40
67.	"Gold is in our hearts"	Lee Nyeom; Park Se-jun	2:02
Total length:			2:41:00

=== Singles ===
Part 1

Released on February 28, 2021
No.	Title	Artist	Length
1.	"Ombra mai fu"	Choi Sung-hoon (La Poem)	3:01
2.	"Ombra mai fu" (inst.)		3:01
Total length:			6:02

Part 2

Released on March 7, 2021
No.	Title	Lyrics	Music	Artist	Length
1.	"Adrenaline (Italian ver.)"	Park Se-joon; Park Ye-seo	Woo Ji-hoon; Park Se-joon	Aalia	3:27
2.	"Adrenaline (Italian ver.)" (inst.)		Woo Ji-hoon; Park Se-joon		3:27
Total length:					6:54

Part 3

Released on March 14, 2021
No.	Title	Lyrics	Music	Artist	Length
1.	"Adrenaline"	Park Ye-seo; Park Se-joon	Park Se-joon; Woo Ji-hoon	Solar (Mamamoo)	3:27
2.	"Adrenaline" (inst.)		Park Se-joon; Woo Ji-hoon		3:27
Total length:					6:54

Part 4

Released on March 21, 2021
No.	Title	Artist	Length
1.	"Lacrimosa"	La Poem	3:48
2.	"Lacrimosa" (inst.)		3:48
Total length:			7:36

Part 5

Released on April 4, 2021
No.	Title	Lyrics	Music	Artist	Length
1.	"Is This Love"	Aalia; Park Se-joon	Park Se-joon; Kim Tae-hwan	Aalia	3:37
2.	"Is This Love" (inst.)		Park Se-joon; Kim Tae-hwan		3:37
Total length:					7:14

Part 6

Released on April 25, 2021
No.	Title	Lyrics	Music	Artist	Length
1.	"I'm Always By Your Side"	Park Se-joon; Woo Ji-hoon; John Park	Park Se-joon; Woo Ji-hoon	John Park	3:51
2.	"I'm Always By Your Side" (inst.)		Park Se-joon; Woo Ji-hoon		3:51
Total length:					7:42

== Reception ==
=== Viewership ===
A 7.7% average viewership rating was recorded nationwide for the series' first episode, at the time making it the third-highest premiere rating of any weekend drama of the network and fourth-highest premiere rating overall, bested by Mr. Sunshine, Encounter and Mr. Queen.

The drama is currently the eighteenth highest-rated drama in Korean cable television history.

Vincenzo : South Korea viewers per episode (millions)

Season	Episode number																				Average
Season	1	2	3	4	5	6	7	8	9	10	11	12	13	14	15	16	17	18	19	20	Average
1	1.948	2.389	2.098	2.587	2.447	2.893	2.429	2.755	2.364	3.024	2.439	2.840	2.871	2.884	2.628	2.754	2.719	3.109	3.075	3.841	3.380

Source: Audience measurement performed nationwide by Nielsen Korea

Average TV viewership ratings
Ep.	Original broadcast date	Average audience share (Nielsen Korea)	
Ep.	Original broadcast date	Nationwide	Seoul
1	February 20, 2021	7.659% (1st)	8.728% (1st)
2	February 21, 2021	9.295% (1st)	10.207% (1st)
3	February 27, 2021	8.121% (1st)	9.340% (1st)
4	February 28, 2021	10.215% (1st)	11.201% (1st)
5	March 6, 2021	9.674% (1st)	10.683% (1st)
6	March 7, 2021	11.082% (1st)	12.165% (1st)
7	March 13, 2021	9.241% (1st)	9.992% (1st)
8	March 14, 2021	10.380% (1st)	11.292% (1st)
9	March 20, 2021	9.057% (1st)	9.729% (1st)
10	March 21, 2021	11.375% (1st)	12.745% (1st)
11	March 27, 2021	9.311% (1st)	10.705% (1st)
12	March 28, 2021	10.736% (1st)	12.405% (1st)
13	April 3, 2021	10.815% (1st)	11.555% (1st)
14	April 4, 2021	11.258% (1st)	12.487% (1st)
15	April 10, 2021	10.296% (1st)	11.150% (1st)
16	April 11, 2021	10.572% (1st)	11.600% (1st)
17	April 24, 2021	10.961% (1st)	12.278% (1st)
18	April 25, 2021	12.276% (1st)	13.912% (1st)
19	May 1, 2021	11.854% (1st)	12.659% (1st)
20	May 2, 2021	14.636% (1st)	16.564% (1st)
Average		10.441%	11.570%
Special	April 17, 2021	4.445% (1st)	5.098% (2nd)
In the table above, the blue numbers represent the lowest ratings and the red numbers represent the highest ratings.; This drama airs on a cable channel/pay TV which normally has a relatively smaller audience compared to free-to-air TV/public broadcasters (KBS, SBS, MBC and EBS).; No episodes aired on April 17 and 18 as the scheduled episodes were pushed to the following week. A special episode aired instead on April 17.

== Awards and nominations ==
Year	Award ceremony	Category	Nominee / Work	Result	Ref.
2021	57th Baeksang Arts Awards	Best Director (TV)	Kim Hee-won	Nominated	
2021	57th Baeksang Arts Awards	Best Actor (TV)	Song Joong-ki	Nominated	
2021	Brand of the Year Awards	Drama of the Year	Vincenzo	Won	
2021	Brand of the Year Awards	Actor of the Year	Song Joong-ki	Won	
2021	Brand of the Year Awards	Actress of the Year	Jeon Yeo-been	Nominated	
2021	3rd Asia Contents Awards	Best Creative	Vincenzo	Nominated	
2021	3rd Asia Contents Awards	Best Asian TV Series	Vincenzo	Nominated	
2021	3rd Asia Contents Awards	Best Actor	Song Joong-ki	Nominated	
2021	3rd Asia Contents Awards	Best Writer	Park Jae-beom	Nominated	
2021	Seoul International Drama Awards	Top Excellence Korean Drama	Vincenzo	Won	
2021	Seoul International Drama Awards	Top Excellence Korean Actress	Jeon Yeo-been	Nominated	
2021	Seoul International Drama Awards	Top Excellence Korean Actor	Song Joong-ki	Won	
2021	Korean Popular Culture and Arts Awards	Presidential Commendation	Park Jae-beom	Won	
2021	14th Tokyo Drama Awards	Special Award for Foreign Drama	Vincenzo	Won	
2021	6th Asia Artist Awards	Best Artist Award	Jeon Yeo-been	Won	
2021	Korea Content Awards	Minister of Culture, Sports and Tourism Commendation	Kim Hee-won	Won	
2021	26th Asian Television Awards	Best Drama Series	Vincenzo	Won	
2022	8th APAN Star Awards	Grand Prize (Daesang)	Song Joong-ki	Won	
2022	8th APAN Star Awards	Best Director	Kim Hee-won	Nominated	
2022	8th APAN Star Awards	Top Excellence Award, Actor in a Miniseries	Song Joong-ki	Nominated	
2022	8th APAN Star Awards	Best Supporting Actor	Yoon Byung-hee	Won	
2022	8th APAN Star Awards	Best Couple	Song Joong-ki and Jeon Yeo-been	Nominated	

=== Listicle ===
Name of publisher, year listed, name of listicle, and placement
Publisher	Year	Listicle	Placement	Ref.
NME	2021	The 10 best Korean dramas of 2021	4th	
