= Kim Dae-jin (actor) =

South Korean actor (born 1977)

Kim Dae-jin (김대진)
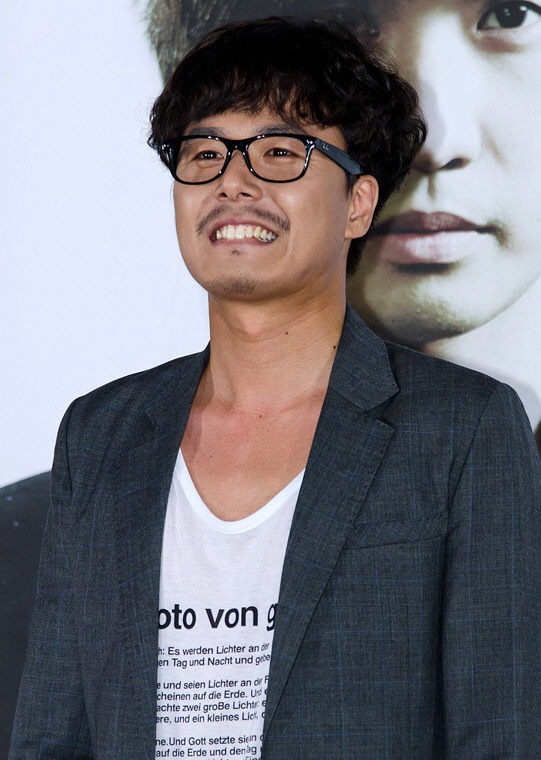
- Kim in June 2011
- Born: April 30, 1977 (age 49); South Korea
- Other names: Na Yoon 나윤

Kim Dae-jin (born April 30, 1977), also known by his stage name Na Yoon is a South Korean actor.

== Filmography ==
=== TV series ===
Year	Title	Role
2005	Oh! Sarah	
2005	A Love to Kill	Park Mi-suk
2007	In-soon Is Pretty	Song Jin-tae
2009	Iris	Hwang Tae-sung
2010–2012	Quiz of God	Kim Sung-do
