= Reflex asystolic syncope =

Form of loss of consciousness and postural tone encountererd mainly in young children

- Other names: Reflex anoxic seizure

Reflex asystolic syncope (RAS) is a form of syncope encountered mainly, but not exclusively, in young children. Reflex anoxic seizures are not epileptic seizures or epilepsy. This is usually a consequence of a reduction in cerebral perfusion by oxygenated blood. It can be a result of either a sudden reduction in the blood flow to the brain, a drop in the oxygen content of the blood supplying the brain, or a combination of the two. Syncope can have different meanings ranging from transient loss of consciousness, usually accompanied by a decrease or loss in postural tone (the principal manifestations of "simple faints"), to tonic and myoclonic events and nonepileptic spasms.

== Signs and symptoms ==
A minor bump to the head is the most commonly reported precipitant. Usually the toddler trips and falls; the child's caregiver may hear the bump. Most commonly, the child does not cry, although some parents give descriptions of the child "trying to cry" (Stephenson 1978), or there may be a gasp or a sob. Syncope rapidly ensues. Indeed, the short latency between the stimulus and the attack has been emphasized as an important distinction from the more familiar (at least in older children and adults) vasovagal syncope. The child loses awareness and postural tone, falling to the ground. There may be down-beat nystagmus. The child is likely to be pale, sometimes described as "deathly white," which is entirely appropriate given that they are likely to be asystolic; however, not all children go pale (or at least are perceived as going pale by their caregivers). Doctors have recorded descriptions from parents of "blue or purple lips," "yellow patches through the blue," and of no noticeable color change. In some attacks, the child rapidly returns to normal following the limp or pallid phase. However, more usually there is a convulsive phase. This is usually manifested with tonic stiffening, often amounting to opisthotonus, and often includes clenching of the jaw and hands. Video recordings of other forms of anoxic seizures (vasovagal syncopes) suggest that there may be marked asymmetry. Parents may report the eyes to have rolled or to be "popping out of the head." A few clonic jerks of the limbs or spasms are often noted. Urinary incontinence is not uncommon. Any initial limpness may be so short that the whole attack is dominated by the convulsive components.

=== Recovery ===
Recovery is often rapid, but usually the child is sleepy after the attack, and there may be persisting pallor. Doctors reported that the length of the postictal stupor reflected the duration of the asystole up to a maximum of 3 minutes of stupor. Some cases recorded took longer to recover.

== Cause ==
Reflex anoxic seizures are a particular type of anoxic seizure, most commonly seen in young children in whom an anoxic seizure or syncope is provoked or precipitated by a noxious stimulus (hence "reflex"). Various precipitants have been identified, but the most common is an unexpected bump to the head. Breath-holding attacks have been recognized for centuries. However, it is only relatively recently that their pathophysiology has begun to be understood, and in consequence, their separation from reflex anoxic seizures has been recognized. Indeed, the distinction between the two may not be complete.

Although minor bumps to the head are reported as the most common precipitants to reflex anoxic seizures, many other stimuli may also be involved. Doctors emphasized the importance of minor injuries and sudden fright. They noted that occipital blows to the head appeared to be particularly provocative. Pain, especially from emotion (surprise, fear, annoyance, frustration, and excitement), crying, and fever were provocative factors. Fever was reported as a provocative factor in 14% of cases. Some cases of fever-induced reflex anoxic seizures are likely to be misdiagnosed as febrile (epileptic) seizures, as has been emphasized by a number of authors. Many, if not most, cases of venipuncture fits are reflex anoxic seizures. When one considers the vast range of situations in which a child (or adult) can be surprised, frightened, upset, or merely excited, it is easy to understand how reflex anoxic seizures can occur in special settings, such as bathing and water immersion; in the anesthetic room; when witnessing "blood and gore"; at the dentist office, school, place of worship, or the hairdresser's; and whilst watching television.

The precipitants and the manifestations of reflex anoxic seizures may change with age. Hence, in unsteady toddlers, minor bumps to the head are likely to predominate, whilst in the older child, adolescent, and adult, factors such as the sight of blood or venipuncture are likely to be more relevant. The adult physician is likely to classify such events as vasovagal syncopes rather than as reflex anoxic seizures and indeed progression through reflex anoxic seizures to vasovagal syncope is recognized. In this regard, note that beyond the toddler stage, children with reflex anoxic seizures may report out-of-body experiences with a dream-like quality.

=== Types ===
Numerous types have been described. The best known, if not necessarily the best understood, is the "simple faint" or vasovagal syncope. At least in infants and children, breath-holding attacks are also widely recognized as reflex anoxic seizures. Other types include cardiac syncope (including long QT disorders, other cardiac arrhythmias, and structural cardiac disease), syncope due to standing (see orthostatic hypotension), hyperventilation, compulsive Valsalva maneuvers, gastroesophageal reflux disease, and imposed upper airway obstruction(suffocation). In addition, anoxic seizures are a feature of both hyperekplexia and familial rectal pain syndrome. Finally, there are likely to be other types of anoxic seizure or syncope not yet characterized.

== Epidemiology ==
There is considerable variation in the frequency of reflex anoxic seizures. Some subjects undoubtedly only ever have a single attack whilst other well-documented cases have multiple daily attacks. The attacks have been reported to generally reach a peak in frequency towards the end of the first or beginning of the second year of life.

Reflex anoxic seizures occur in otherwise normal children, although there is no reason to suppose that children with disorders such as cerebral palsy and general learning disability are protected from them. They usually start in infancy or early childhood. Presumably because the precipitants to the attacks generally require a degree of mobility, descriptions of reflex anoxic seizures before the age of 6 months are rare. Also, there are many descriptions of attacks starting in later childhood and in adult life, although in such cases, the precipitants tend to be different, for example, involving bloodletting (Roddy et al. 1983) or dental extractions.
