= Park Jae-beom =

South Korean television screenwriter

- 박재범
- Born: 1971 (age 54–55); South Korea
- Education: Dongguk University – Department of English Literature
- Occupation: Screenwriter
- Years active: 2000–present
- Employers: KBS (1998–2003); Gill Pictures (2017–2019); Plot Store (2019–present)
- Organization(s): Korea Television and Radio Writers Association (KTRWA)
- Notable work: Quiz of God; Good Doctor; Good Manager; The Fiery Priest; Vincenzo
- Spouse: Undisclosed
- Children: 2
- Honours: Presidential Commendation

Korean name
- Hangul: 박재범
- Hanja: 朴載範
- RR: Bak Jaebeom
- MR: Pak Chaebŏm

Park Jae-beom (Korean: 박재범) is a South Korean screenwriter. He began his writing career in 2000 with the film Theater, followed by writing for two KBS one-act dramas in 2002 and 2003. In 2010, he made his official television debut with OCN's crime series Quiz of God. In 2013, he wrote the script for KBS2's medical drama Good Doctor, which later received an US adaptation as The Good Doctor. Park is widely recognized for his self-proclaimed "Justice Trilogy", which includes the acclaimed dramas Good Manager (2017), The Fiery Priest (2019), and Vincenzo (2021).

== Early life and education ==
Park's lifelong dream had been to direct a movie since middle school. He enrolled in Dongguk University's Department of English Literature in the Class of 1990 and minored in Theater and Film. During his college years, his passion grew even stronger as he studied directing, playwriting, and screenplay, focusing primarily on theater. He became immersed in theater and even appeared in independent films, trying his hand at acting. He fell in love with acting.

"When I was in college, The Moon of Seoul was aired. Seniors like Han Seok-gyu and Choi Min-sik would come to school and teach us acting skills."

His professor advised him to cultivate mental clarity while making important decisions instead of overthinking. Furthermore, the professor encouraged him to explore careers in directing or writing.

== Career ==
=== Early career as director and scriptwriter ===
After graduating, he began preparing for his film debut while also working on scriptwriting. He also worked as a cartoon story writer since 1996. In 1998, in the midst of his endeavors, he impulsively submitted his script to a KBS script contest. The contest was seeking five scripts, and Park's entry ranked sixth among the submissions. However, despite not winning, he unexpectedly received a separate offer for a six-month internship.

Park had the opportunity to direct his first screenplay, marking his directorial debut in the feature film titled Theatre. In 2000, he received an invitation to showcase his independently directed film at the 4th Bucheon International Fantastic Film Festival. The film portrays a group of moviegoers who become trapped in a gloomy theater after watching 1996 horror film Scream. As they grasp the horrifying truth, they discover that the theater owner intends to kill all of them within 70 minutes. With no escape and casualties increasing, the remaining survivors fight desperately for their lives.

During the years 2002 to 2003, he wrote the one-act dramas 'Panty Model' and 'S University Law School Failure Case' for KBS Drama City. Then, he took a long hiatus as a drama scriptwriter to pursue a career as a director. However, between the ages of 30 and 38, his directing career was marked by four failed film projects, leading him to a period of contemplation. In hindsight, he expressed his concerns, saying, "I was worried because I got married and had a child."

=== Career breakthrough as drama scriptwriter ===
Initially, returning to drama writing was not a priority for Park. However, a series of failures and his responsibilities as the family provider changed the situation. Park's path took an unexpected turn when a new project launched by OCN presented him with an unforeseen opportunity. He took on the task of writing the first season of Quiz of God. Being a CJ-planned production, Quiz of God incorporated numerous cinematic elements, which gave Park confidence that he could execute it with his desired tone and style.

Quiz of God was a groundbreaking production, introducing the genre of medical investigation drama to K Drama. It aired for an extended period, following a seasonal format, which was previously unheard of in South Korea. Both the genre itself and the seasonal model were novel additions to the Korean Drama landscape. From the third season onwards, Park assumed the role of creator, gaining insights into its perspective through trial and error. He fused directing, planning, and writing as creator of Quiz of God. In South Korea, the concept of the creator encompasses both the writer and producer roles, which, while common in American dramas, remains relatively unfamiliar in the country.

Before the end of Season 3 of Quiz of God, the production of Good Doctor was decided. The script was initially titled Green Mes (Green Scalpel). The story centers around Park Si-on, a gifted individual with autism. As a child, he was placed in a specialized care center where his remarkable memory and exceptional spatial skills were discovered. As he grows up, he becomes a resident in pediatric surgery, facing the task of proving his abilities within a six-month period. The show features a cast including Joo Won, Moon Chae-won, Joo Sang-wook, Kim Min-seo, Chun Ho-jin, Kwak Do-won, and Ko Chang-seok. It was broadcast on KBS2 from August 5 to October 8, 2013, with episodes airing on Mondays and Tuesdays at 21:55. The series consisted of 20 episodes and gained great popularity, earning Park the title of star writer.

This work became the first Korean drama to be remade in the United States in a seasonal format. The adaptation maintains the framework of the original storyline. The American remake, The Good Doctor, debuted on ABC in late September 2017. Produced by Daniel Dae Kim, it is set in San Jose, California, and written by David Shore, known for House. Due to its popularity, the show has continued to air until its fifth season.

Park's next project was the drama Blood, fantasy medical drama which centered around the character of Jason Park, a remarkably handsome vampire and skilled hepato-pancreato-biliary surgeon and medical researcher at Taemin Hospital. The drama features actors Ahn Jae-hyun, Ji Jin-hee, Koo Hye-sun, and Son Soo-hyun. It was aired on KBS2 from February 16 to April 21, 2015, with episodes airing on Mondays and Tuesdays at 22:00, totaling 20 episodes. Unfortunately, Blood did not replicate the success of Park's previous drama.

=== Park's Justice Trilogy, film scriptwriting and upcoming projects ===
After wrapping up the drama Blood, Park experienced a physical breakdown due to accumulated stress from the past decade. Following his surgery, he found himself confined to the hospital for approximately two weeks with nothing to do, so he turned to watching various Korean entertainment shows. Subsequently, he embarked on a trip to Gunsan. It was during his visit that Park encountered two individuals engrossed in conversation. The exchange appeared to revolve around one person seeking employment from the other, yet both expressed disappointment with the lack of sincerity. This overheard conversation ignited an idea, serving as inspiration for his next project, Chief Kim.

Chief Kim, also known as Good Manager, is a comedic office drama centered around Kim Sung-ryong, an accounting manager who excels at exposing financial misconduct and fighting against injustice. Namgoong Min performs as Chief Kim, a former low-level accountant from Gunsan, a small city in North Jeolla Province, who has a history of working for gangster. This 20 episodes series was broadcast on KBS2 from January 25 to March 30, 2017, airing on Wednesdays and Thursdays at 22:00 KST.

Good Manager ended with a final episode viewership rating of 18.4% (Nielsen Korea). The book 'Chief Kim's Workplace White Paper' (Aureum), which compiles famous lines, was published and continues to be popular.

In the same year, Park returned to the big screen with The Wrath, a remake of the 1986 Korean horror film Woman's Wail. Park adapted the original script by Heo Seong-su. Directed by Yoo Young-seon, known for the acclaimed film The Wicked in 2014, the film follows the story of Ok-bun (Son Na-eun), who unintentionally enters a mansion plagued by mysterious deaths. There, she encounters Mrs. Shin (Seo Young-hee), a woman with a secret. The film was released domestically on November 8, 2018.

The Fiery Priest (SBS, 2019) revolves around a hot-tempered Catholic priest who confronts evildoers and delivers punches to those who refuse to repent for their sins. The series offers a blend of diverse characters and comedy. Featuring Kim Nam-gil, Kim Sung-kyun, Lee Hanee, Go Jun, and Keum Sae-rok in the lead roles, The Fiery Priest made history as the first drama to occupy SBS's Fridays and Saturdays timeslot. It aired from February 15 to April 20, 2019. In terms of viewership, The Fiery Priest achieved success, becoming the highest-rated miniseries drama on public broadcast in 2019, according to Nielsen Korea. It garnered widespread popularity and became one of the most talked-about dramas of the year. Kim Nam-gil's portrayal of the priest struggling with anger management issues earned him numerous accolades.

In 2021, Vincenzo emerged as the definitive version of writer Jay Park's unique satire, featuring Song Joong-ki as an Italian mafia lawyer who undergoes a transformation into a dark hero. With the motto "punish evil with evil", the dark hero confronts a more insidious form of villainy. The involvement of the Geumga Plaza merchants, entangled with Vincenzo, adds to the intrigue. Inspired by Stephen Chow's Kung Fu Hustle, Geumga Plaza represents oppressed small-town citizens who are empowered by Vincenzo's villainous presence, transforming into strong and active individuals. Their growth process and eccentricities become the highlights of Geumga Plaza.

After Vincenzo, it was reported that Park worked on script adaptation for Han Jae-rim's disaster film Emergency Declaration.

In 2019, it was reported that Park has been planning to create a drama called Chief Inspector 1963 (working title), which serves as a prequel to MBC's legendary detective drama, Chief Inspector. The series aired on MBC for a remarkable 18-year run, spanning from 1971 to 1989, and garnered viewership rating exceeding 70%. The portrayal of Chief Park Young-han by actor Choi Bool-am played a significant role in its popularity. In September 2022, MBC confirmed the production and announced that it will be written by new writer Kim Young-shin, who was discovered by MBC's drama planning team. Set in the 1960s, a decade before the events of the original series, the prequel will be directed by Kim Sung-hoon. In April 2023, Lee Je-hoon confirmed his appearance as the younger version of Park Young-han.

== Working style ==
Park's works always contain social critique with satire He is a diligent writer by nature; for Vincenzo, he studied of over 10 social science books.

A script that is understood by many people. The story is about spreading jam evenly on bread. If commercial art involves spreading the jam so that you can eat it wherever you eat it, pure art involves spreading it on a specific area and leading people to discover that area. It's not a matter of superiority or inferiority, but I want to write something that's enjoyable and fun for everyone to read. Park about Storytelling.

In October 2019, Park established a writer's office called Plot Store (플롯 스토어). Within Plot Store, he collaborates with eight junior writers specializing in different genres such as horror, thriller, and comedy. They have adopted the American drama work system as a benchmark, which promotes collaborative synergy among writers. Park mentioned, "When Good Doctor was remade in the United States, I observed the work site and saw the involvement of diverse individuals, such as an autistic writer and a writer with experience as a casino dealer, in the script. It made me realize the importance of pursuing diversity to avoid being confined to a single genre. Two to three writers are assigned to each genre, and they hold meetings together. The first result of this collaborative approach is Chief Inspector 1963." Park emphasized, "The era of writers working alone is over. In order to adapt to changes like OTT, the writer system must also evolve. It is crucial for training the next generation," he added.

In addition to their collaboration with MBC for "Chief Inspector 1963," Plot Store has also engaged in other partnership. Since 2021, They worked with Astory for a cyberpunk action drama titled Shaman. Plot Store partnered with Barunson for joint projects in a series. In 2020, It also partnered with Kakao M.

== Personal life ==
Park married his wife while in his 30s during his time as a film director. In an interview dated 2017, it was disclosed that they have two children, aged 18 and 13 (Korean age).

== Filmography ==
=== Film ===
Year	Title		Role		Ref.
Year	English	Korean	Original Script	Script Adaptation	Ref.
2000	Theater	씨어터	Park Jae-beom	—N/a	
2018	The Wrath	여곡성	Park Jae-beom	—N/a	
2022	Emergency Declaration	비상선언	—N/a	Park Jae-beom and Yu Gap-yeol	

=== Television drama ===
The most important things to consider when writing a drama are, of course, people and society. To be more specific, it talks about 'courtesy toward humans', 'hope for humans' and 'clearly shows the author's view on society.' In my opinion, a good drama is one where the writer's thoughts are clearly revealed! Don't put more stress on your viewers than necessary! Do not cause harm to society even in the smallest detail! These are three things. These three things we strive to maintain no matter what genre we use.

— Park on What is a Good Drama

Year	Title		Network	Role		Ref.
Year	English	Korean	Network	Scriptwriter	Creator	Ref.
2002	KBS Drama city Panty model	KBS 드라마시티 팬티모델	KBS2	Park Jae-beom	—N/a	
2003	KBS Drama city University S law department in a case	KBS 드라마시티 S대 법학과 미달사건	KBS2	Park Jae-beom	—N/a	
2010	Quiz of God	신의 퀴즈 1	OCN	Park Jae-beom	—N/a	
2011	Quiz of God	신의 퀴즈 2	OCN	Park Jae-beom	—N/a	
2012	Quiz of God	신의 퀴즈 3	OCN	Park Dae-sung	Park Jae-beom	
2014	Quiz of God	신의 퀴즈 4	OCN	Lee Doo-il	Park Jae-beom	
2018	Quiz of God	신의 퀴즈	OCN	Kang Eun-sun	Park Jae-beom	
2013	Good Doctor	굿 닥터	KBS2	Park Jae-beom	—N/a	
2014	KBS Drama Special A revengeful spirit	KBS 드라마 스페셜 원혼	KBS2	Park Jae-beom	—N/a	
2015	Blood	블러드	KBS2	Park Jae-beom	—N/a	
2017	Good Manager	김과장	KBS2	Park Jae-beom	—N/a	
2019	The Fiery Priest	열혈사제	SBS	Park Jae-beom	—N/a	
2020	Dinner Mate	저녁 같이 드실래요?	MBC	Kim Joo; Lee Ju-ha	Park Jae-beom	
2021	Vincenzo	빈센조	tvN	Park Jae-beom	Park Jae-beom	
2024	Chief Investigator 1963	수사반장 1963	MBC	Kim Young-shin	Park Jae-beom	
2024 - 2025	The Fiery Priest Season 2	열혈사제	SBS	Park Jae-beom	Park Jae-beom	
TBA	Shaman	무당	OTT (TBA)	Park Jae-beom	Park Jae-beom	

== Accolades ==
=== Awards and nominations ===
Year	Award	Category	Recipient	Result	Ref.
2013	26th Grimae Awards	Best Drama	Good Doctor	Won	
2013	Korea Drama Awards	Best Drama	Good Doctor	Nominated	
2013	Korea Drama Awards	Best Writer	Good Doctor	Won	
2014	Korea Producers & Directors' (PD) Awards	Best Drama	Good Doctor	Won	
2014	Baeksang Arts Awards	Best Drama	Good Doctor	Won	
2014	Banff World Media Festival	Best Serial Drama	Good Doctor	Won	
2014	Korea Broadcasting Awards	Best Drama	Good Doctor	Won	
2014	Seoul International Drama Awards	Best Mini-series	Good Doctor	Runner-up	
2017	10th Korea Drama Awards	Best Drama	Good Manager	Nominated	
2017	10th Korea Drama Awards	Best Screenplay	Good Manager	Nominated	
2018	30th Korea Producers & Directors' (PD) Awards	Best Drama (Note: Tied with Fight for My Way)	Good Manager	Won	
2019	14th Seoul International Drama Awards	Excellent Korean Drama	The Fiery Priest	Won	
2019	12th Korea Drama Awards	Best Drama	The Fiery Priest	Nominated	
2019	12th Korea Drama Awards	Best Screenplay	The Fiery Priest	Nominated	
2019	32nd Grimae Awards	Best Picture (Drama)	The Fiery Priest	Won	
2019	SBS Drama Awards	Wayve Award	The Fiery Priest	Won	
2021	Brand of the Year Awards	Drama of the Year	Vincenzo	Won	
2021	3rd Asia Contents Awards	Best Creative	Vincenzo	Nominated	
2021	3rd Asia Contents Awards	Best Asian TV Series	Vincenzo	Nominated	
2021	3rd Asia Contents Awards	Best Writer	Vincenzo	Nominated	
2021	Seoul International Drama Awards	Top Excellence Korean Drama	Vincenzo	Won	
2021	14th Tokyo Drama Awards	Special Award for Foreign Drama	Vincenzo	Won	
2021	26th Asian Television Awards	Best Drama Series	Vincenzo	Won	

=== State honors ===
Name of country, ceremony, year given, and name of honor
Country	Ceremony	Year	Honor Or Award	Ref.
South Korea	9th Korea Content Award	2017	Prime Minister Commendation	
South Korea	12th Korean Popular Culture and Arts Awards (Note: Honors are given at the Korean Popular Culture and Arts Awards, arranged by the Korea Creative Content Agency and hosted by the Ministry of Culture, Sports and Tourism. They are awarded to those who have contributed to the arts and South Korea's pop culture.)	2021	Presidential Commendation	

=== Listicles ===
Name of publisher, year listed, name of listicle, and placement
Publisher	Year	Listicle	Placement	Ref.
Cine21	2023	22 Writers	Shortlisted	
