= Breath-holding spell =

Episodes of breathing cessation in children

Breath-holding spells
- Specialty: Pulmonology

Breath-holding spells (BHS) are the occurrence of episodic apnea in children, possibly associated with syncope (loss of consciousness and changes in postural tone).

Breath-holding spells occur in approximately 5% of the population with equal distribution between males and females. They are most common in children between 6 and 18 months and usually not present after 5 years of age. They are unusual before 6 months of age. A positive family history can be elicited in 25% of cases. They may be confused with a seizure disorder. They are sometimes observed in response to frustration during or following disciplinary conflict.

== Diagnosis ==
The diagnosis of a breath-holding spell is made clinically. A good history including the sequence of events, lack of incontinence and no postictal phase, help to make an accurate diagnosis. Some families are advised to make a video recording of the events to aid diagnosis. An electrocardiogram (ECG) may rule out cardiac arrhythmia as a cause. There is some evidence that children with anemia (especially iron deficiency) may be more prone to breath-holding spells.

=== Classification ===
There are four types of breath-holding spells.

Simple breath-holding spell
This is the most common type and the cause is the holding of breath. The usual precipitating event is frustration or injury. There is no major alteration of circulation or oxygenation and the recovery is spontaneous.

Cyanotic breath-holding spells
These are usually precipitated by anger or frustration, although they may occur after a painful experience. The child cries and has forced expiration, sometimes leading to cyanosis (blueness in color), loss of muscle tone, and loss of consciousness. The child usually recovers within minutes, but some fall asleep for an hour or so. Physiologically, there is often hypocapnea (low levels of carbon dioxide) and usually hypoxia (low levels of oxygen). There is increased intrathoracic pressure and decreased cardiac output following the Valsalva maneuver. This eventually leads to a significant decrease in circulation to the brain and ultimately, loss of consciousness. There is no postictal phase (as is seen with seizures), no incontinence, and the child is fine in between spells. EEGs are normal in these children. There is no relationship to the subsequent development of seizures or cerebral injury.

Pallid breath-holding spells
The most common stimulus is a painful event. The child turns pale (as opposed to blue) and loses consciousness with little if any crying. The EEG is also normal, and there is no postictal phase, nor incontinence. The child is usually alert within minutes. There may be a relationship with adulthood syncope.

Complicated breath-holding spells
These may simply be a more severe form of the two most common types. They generally begin as either a cyanotic or pallid spell that is then associated with seizure-like activity. An EEG taken while the child is not having a spell is still generally normal.

== Treatment ==
The most important approach is to reassure the family, because witnessing a breath-holding spell is a frightening experience for observers. There is no definitive treatment available or needed for breath-holding spells, as the child will eventually outgrow them.

Some trials have demonstrated the efficacy of iron therapy, especially because although BHS can readily occur without anemia, BHS has been found to be aggravated by the presence of anemia. Other studies have supported the use of piracetam; a 1998 study indicating that over two months piracetam reduced BHS incidence by sixty percent, twice as much as a placebo. All of these studies agree with the established medical view that a pharmacological agent is not necessary, although it may be desirable for the comfort of the parent and child.

Two articles on breath-holding spells strongly suggest that parents consider having their child be tested by electrocardiogram for the rare, but real possibility that the BHS episodes are actually a symptom of prolonged QT-syndrome, a serious but treatable form of cardiac arrhythmia.
