= Park Chan-wook filmography =

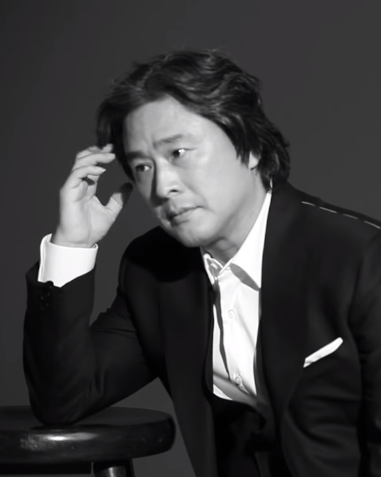
- Park in 2013
- Film: 13
- Television series: 3
- Documentary: 3
- Others: 10 short films

Park Chan-wook (Korean: 박찬욱; pronounced [pak̚ tɕʰanuk̚]; born August 23, 1963) is a South Korean filmmaker and former film critic.

Park made his debut as director in 1992. However, he has largely disowned his first two films from the 1990s, considering the 2000 hit Joint Security Area to be his real debut. It was a massive turning point, not only did it break box office records in South Korea, but it also gave him the creative "blank check" he needed to make his famous The Vengeance Trilogy. While the first film in that series, Sympathy for Mr. Vengeance (2002), was a bit of a tough sell for critics and audiences at the time, he struck gold with Oldboy (2003) and Lady Vengeance (2005). Oldboy in particular became a global sensation and is still cited as one of the best films ever made.

Park's career only gained momentum after his early success. Films like Thirst (2009) and The Handmaiden (2016) further solidified his reputation, with the latter even winning a BAFTA. By the time he won Best Director at Cannes Film Festival for Decision to Leave (2022), he had become a household name in world cinema.

In addition to his work as a director, Park has significantly influenced global media as a producer. He produced Bong Joon-ho's sci-fi epic Snowpiercer (2013) and later served as an executive producer for its American television adaptation, which ran from 2020 to 2024. He has further expanded into prestige television by directing English-language miniseries such as The Little Drummer Girl (2018) and The Sympathizer (2024).

"PARKing CHANce" is a collaborative directing brand founded by Park Chan-wook and his younger brother, media artist Park Chan-kyong. (Note: "PARKing CHANce" is a collaborative directing brand founded by Park Chan-wook and his younger brother, media artist Park Chan-kyong. The name "Parking Chance" is a wordplay on words combining the sounds of the brothers' surname Park and the syllable in their given names Chan, and can also be interpreted in English as "parking opportunity," reflecting their desire to explore creative projects that are challenging to secure.) The brand has created several short films, including Night Fishing (2011), Odalslow (2011), Day Trip (2012), V (2013), Decades Apart (2017), and Believe It or Not(2018).

== Films ==
Key
†	Denotes films that have not yet been released

=== Feature film ===
Year	Title	Credited as			Notes	Ref.
Year	Title	Director	Writer	Producer	Notes	Ref.
1988	Kkamdong	Assistant	No	No		
1989	Watercolor Painting in a Rainy Day	Assistant	No	No		
1992	The Moon Is... the Sun's Dream	Yes	Yes	No		
1997	Trio	Yes	Yes	No		
2000	Anarchists	No	Yes	No		
2000	Joint Security Area	Yes	Yes	No		
2001	The Humanist	No	Yes	No		
2002	Sympathy for Mr. Vengeance	Yes	Yes	No		
2002	A Bizarre Love Triangle	No	Yes	No		
2003	Oldboy	Yes	Yes	No		
2005	Lady Vengeance	Yes	Yes	No		
2005	Boy Goes to Heaven	No	Yes	No		
2006	I'm a Cyborg, But That's OK	Yes	Yes	Yes		
2008	Crush and Blush	No	Yes	Yes		
2009	Thirst	Yes	Yes	Yes		
2013	Stoker	Yes	No	No	English-language film debut	
2013	Snowpiercer	No	No	Yes		
2014	Bitter, Sweet, Seoul	Co-directing	Yes	Yes	Documentary	
2016	The Handmaiden	Yes	Yes	Yes		
2016	The Truth Beneath	No	Yes	No		
2022	Decision to Leave	Yes	Yes	Yes		
2024	Uprising	No	Yes	Yes		
2025	No Other Choice	Yes	Yes	Yes	co-produced with Back Jisun, Michèle Ray-Gavras, Alexandre Gavras; co-wrote with Lee Kyoung-mi, Don McKellar, Lee Ja-hye	

=== Short films ===
Year	Title	Credited as			Notes	Ref.
Year	Title	Director	Writer	Producer	Notes	Ref.
1999	Judgment	Yes	Yes	Yes		
2003	If You Were Me	Yes	Yes	No	Segment: Never Ending Peace And Love	
2004	Three... Extremes	Yes	Yes	No	Segment: Cut	
2011	Night Fishing	Co-directing	Yes	Yes		
2011	60 Seconds of Solitude in Year Zero	Yes	Yes	No	Segment: Cut	
2011	Odalslow	Co-director	Yes	Yes	Commissioned by Cine21	
2012	Day Trip	Co-director	Yes	No		
2013	V	Co-director	Yes	No	music video for Lee Jung-hyun	
2014	A Rose Reborn	Yes	Co-writer (Note: co-written by himself, Ayako Fujitani, Chung Chung-hoon and Michael Werwie)	No	for Ermenegildo Zegna	
2017	Decades Apart	Co-director	Yes	Yes	for Fondation Cartier pour l'Art Contemporain	
2022	Life Is But a Dream	Yes	Yes	No	for Apple Inc.	

== Television ==
Year	Title	Credited as				Notes	Ref.
Year	Title	Creator	Director	Writer	Executive Producer	Notes	Ref.
2018	The Little Drummer Girl	No	Yes	No	Yes	BBC One Original Series	
2020–2024	Snowpiercer	No	No	No	Yes		
2024	The Sympathizer	Yes	Yes	Showrunner	Yes	HBO Original Series	

== Documentary appearances ==
Year	Title	Notes	Ref.
2005	The Nine Lives of Korean Cinema		
2011	Ari Ari the Korean Cinema		
2025	New-Oldboy Park Chan-wook	SBS TV Special Chuseok Documentary	
