= Day Trip =

Day Trip may refer to:

- Day Trip (album), a 2008 album by Pat Metheny
- Day Trip (film), a 2012 South Korean short film
- day trip
- Daytrip (company), a startup transportation network company
