= List of awards and nominations received by Park Chan-wook =

Park Chan-wook awards and nominations
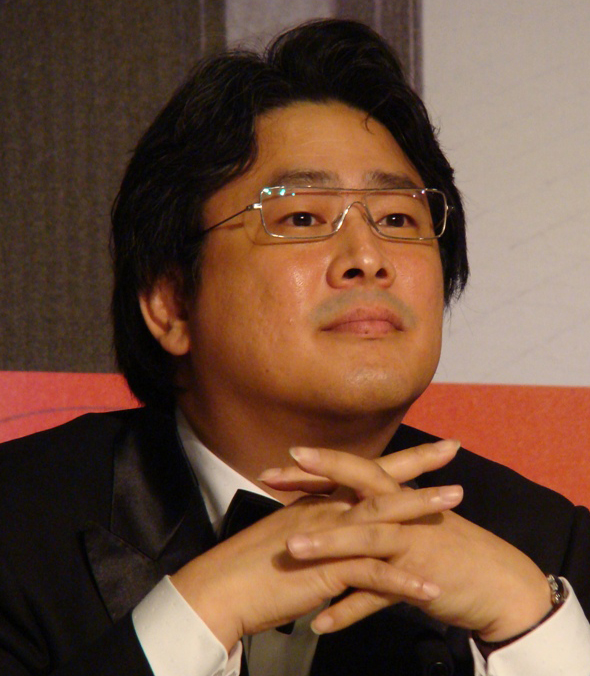
- Park in 2009
Awards and nominations
Award	Wins	Nominations
AARP Movies for Grownups Awards	0	1
Adelaide Film Festival	1	1
Alliance of Women Film Journalists	2	3
Apolo Awards	0	3
Asia-Pacific Film Festival	1	1
Asia Pacific Screen Awards	0	1
Asian Film Awards	1	4
Astra Film Awards	1	4
ASCAP Pop Music Awards	1	1
Asia Artist Awards	2	2
Atlanta Film Critics Circle	1	2
Austin Film Critics Association	3	10
Baeksang Arts Awards	5	15
Bangkok International Film Festival	2	3
Beautiful Art Awards	1	1
Belgian Film Critics Association	1	1
Bergen International Film Festival	1	1
Berlin International Film Festival	3	5
Black Film Critics Circle	0	1
Blue Dragon Film Awards	10	17
Blue Ribbon Awards	1	1
Boston Online Film Critics Association	1	2
Boston Society of Film Critics	1	1
British Academy Film Awards	1	3
British Independent Film Awards	1	2
Brussels International Fantastic Film Festival	2	2
Buil Film Awards	2	10
Busan Film Critics Awards	2	2
Cannes Film Festival	3	8
Chicago Film Critics Association Awards	3	10
Chicago Indie Critics	0	1
Chunsa Film Art Awards	3	4
Columbus Film Critics Association	3	3
Critics Association Of Central Florida	1	1
Critics Choice Awards Asian Pacific Cinema & Television	1	1
Critics' Choice Movie Award	0	5
Dallas–Fort Worth Film Critics Association	2	3
Deauville Asian Film Festival	2	2
Denver Film Critics Society	0	1
Director's Cut Awards	6	7
DiscussingFilm's Global Film Critics Awards	3	3
Dorian Awards	1	5
Dublin Film Critics' Circle	0	2
Empire Awards	0	1
European Film Awards	0	2
Fantasia International Film Festival	1	1
Festival du nouveau cinéma de Montréal	1	1
Florida Film Critics Circle	9	9
Georgia Film Critics Association	2	5
Gold Derby Film Awards	0	2
Golden Bauhinia Awards	2	2
Golden Cinematography Awards	1	1
Golden Globe Awards	0	3
Golden Tomato Awards	0	2
Golden Trailer Awards	1	1
Gotham Independent Film Awards	0	3
Gotham TV Awards	0	1
Grand Bell Awards	4	9
Greater Western New York Film Critics Association	0	3
Hawaii Film Critics Society	0	1
Hollywood Critics Association Awards	0	2
Hong Kong Film Awards	1	2
Houston Film Critics Society	1	4
Indiana Film Journalists Association	1	2
IndieWire Critics Poll	0	2
International Cinephile Society	0	1
Italian Film Noir Festival	1	1
Jerusalem Film Festival	0	1
KALH Honors	1	1
Kansas City Film Critics Circle	0	1
Korean Association of Film Critics Awards	8	8
Korean Film Awards	2	2
Korean Film Producers Association Award	2	2
LACMA Art + Film Gala	1	1
Las Vegas Film Critics Society	0	2
London Film Critics' Circle	1	5
Los Angeles Film Critics Association Awards	1	1
Marie Claire Asia Star Awards	1	1
Marrakech International Film Festival	1	1
Melbourne International Film Festival	1	1
Miami Film Festival	1	1
Midnight Critics Circle	1	4
Minnesota Film Critics Association	0	2
Miskolc International Film Festival	0	1
Music City Film Critics Association	0	1
National Board of Review Awards	2	2
National Society of Film Critics	3	3
New Jersey Film Critics Circle	2	4
New York Film Critics Online	1	4
Newport Beach Film Festival	2	2
North Carolina Film Critics Association	0	4
North Dakota Film Society	0	1
North Texas Film Critics Association	0	1
Online Association Of Female Film Critics	0	2
The Online Film & Television Association	0	1
Online Film Critics Society	2	7
Oporto International Film Festival	3	3
Oslo Films from the South Festival	1	2
Palm Springs International Film Festival	0	2
Phoenix Critics Circle	0	2
Phoenix Film Critics Society	1	1
Portland Critics Association	2	5
Proud Sogang Award	1	1
Puerto Rico Critics Association	0	3
Royal Salute	1	1
San Diego Film Critics Society	0	2
San Francisco Bay Area Film Critics Circle	1	3
San Francisco Film Critics Circle Awards	1	2
Satellite Awards	1	6
Saturn Awards	1	4
Savannah Film Festival	2	2
Seattle Film Critics Society Awards	1	6
Seoul International Drama Awards	1	1
SFFILM	1	1
Sitges Film Festival	3	4
Spikes Asia	1	1
St. Louis Film Critics Association	2	4
Stockholm International Film Festival	2	2
Sunset Circle Awards	1	4
Tokyo International Film Festival	1	1
Toronto Film Critics Association	3	3
Toronto International Film Festival	1	1
Udine Far East Film Festival	1	1
Unforgettable Awards	1	1
Utah Film Critics Association	0	1
Valladolid International Film Festival	0	1
Vancouver Film Critics Circle	0	1
Valladolid International Film Festival	0	1
Venice International Film Festival	3	5
Visionary Awards	1	1
Washington D.C. Area Film Critics Association	1	3
Women Film Critics Circle	1	1

Totals (Note: Certain award groups do not simply award one winner. They acknowledge several different recipients, have runners-up, and have third place. Since this is a specific recognition and is different from losing an award, runner-up mentions are considered wins in this award tally. For simplification and to avoid errors, each award in this list has been presumed to have had a prior nomination.)
- Wins: 173
- Nominations: 367

Park Chan-wook is a South Korean filmmaker who has earned extensive international acclaim. His most notable honors include three major awards from the Cannes Film Festival: the Grand Prix for Oldboy (2003), the Jury Prize for Thirst (2009), and Best Director for Decision to Leave (2022). He also won a BAFTA for The Handmaiden (2016) and two awards at the Berlin International Film Festival, including a Golden Bear for his short film, Night Fishing (2011).

His recent work has continued this winning streak, with his satirical thriller No Other Choice (2025) sweeping the Blue Dragon Film Awards, winning both Best Film and Best Director, and earning a Golden Globe nomination for Best Picture. Beyond his international success, Park remains a titan of South Korean cinema, having collected dozens of trophies from the Blue Dragon, Grand Bell, and Baeksang Arts Awards.

In recognition of his massive contribution to the global spread of Korean culture, the South Korean government has twice bestowed upon him the Order of Cultural Merit. He first received the Bogwan (Precious Crown, 3rd Class) in 2004 following the global success of Oldboy. In 2022, he was elevated to the Eungwan (Silver Crown, 2nd Class), the nation's second-highest cultural honor, which is reserved for individuals whose work has significantly raised the prestige of South Korean arts on the world stage.

== Awards and nominations ==
Award ceremony	Year	Category	Nominated work	Result	Ref.
AARP Movies for Grownups Awards	2026	Best Foreign Language Film	No Other Choice	Nominated	
Academy Awards	2023	Best International Feature Film	Decision to Leave	Shortlisted	
Academy Awards	2026	Best International Feature Film	No Other Choice	Shortlisted	
Adelaide Film Festival	2025	Audience Award for Feature Fiction	No Other Choice	Won	
Alliance of Women Film Journalists	2016	Best Non-English-Language Film	The Handmaiden	Won	
Alliance of Women Film Journalists	2023	Best Non-English Language Film	Decision to Leave	Won	
Alliance of Women Film Journalists	2025	Best International Film	No Other Choice	Nominated	
Apolo Awards	2017	Best Film	The Handmaiden	Nominated	
Apolo Awards	2017	Best Director	The Handmaiden	Nominated	
Apolo Awards	2017	Best Adapted Screenplay	The Handmaiden	Nominated	
Asia-Pacific Film Festival	2003	Best Director	Oldboy	Won	
Asia Pacific Screen Awards	2022	Best Screenplay	Decision to Leave	Nominated	
Asian Film Awards	2017	Best Screenplay	The Handmaiden	Nominated	
Asian Film Awards	2023	Best Film	Decision to Leave	Nominated	
Asian Film Awards	2023	Best Director	Decision to Leave	Nominated	
Asian Film Awards	2023	Best Screenplay	Decision to Leave	Won	
Astra Film Awards	2026	Best International Feature	No Other Choice	Nominated	
Astra Film Awards	2026	Best Motion Picture Comedy or Musical	No Other Choice	Nominated	
Astra Film Awards	2026	Best Adapted Screenplay	No Other Choice	Nominated	
Astra Film Awards	2026	Honorary awards - Filmmaking Achievement Award	—N/a	Honored	
Atlanta Film Critics Circle	2025	Top 10 Films	No Other Choice	7th Place	
Atlanta Film Critics Circle	2025	Best International Feature	No Other Choice	Runner-up	
Austin Film Critics Association	2003	Best Film	Oldboy	Nominated	
Austin Film Critics Association	2003	Best Foreign Film	Oldboy	Won	
Austin Film Critics Association	2016	Best Film	The Handmaiden	4th Place	
Austin Film Critics Association	2016	Best Director	The Handmaiden	Nominated	
Austin Film Critics Association	2016	Best Adapted Screenplay	The Handmaiden	Nominated	
Austin Film Critics Association	2016	Best Foreign Language Film	The Handmaiden	Won	
Austin Film Critics Association	2023	Best Director	Decision to Leave	Nominated	
Austin Film Critics Association	2023	Best International Film	Decision to Leave	Won	
Austin Film Critics Association	2025	Best Adapted Screenplay	No Other Choice	Nominated	
Austin Film Critics Association	2025	Best International Film	No Other Choice	Nominated	
Baeksang Arts Awards	2006	Best Film	Lady Vengeance	Nominated	
Baeksang Arts Awards	2006	Best Director	Lady Vengeance	Nominated	
Baeksang Arts Awards	2010	Best Film	Thirst	Nominated	
Baeksang Arts Awards	2017	Grand Prize (Daesang) (Note: A Daesang (Korean: 대상), which translates to "Grand Prize", is the highest honor given out at South Korean award ceremonies.)	The Handmaiden	Won	
Baeksang Arts Awards	2017	Best Film	The Handmaiden	Nominated	
Baeksang Arts Awards	2017	Best Director	The Handmaiden	Nominated	
Baeksang Arts Awards	2017	Best Screenplay	The Handmaiden	Nominated	
Baeksang Arts Awards	2023	Grand Prize (Daesang) – Film	Decision to Leave	Won	
Baeksang Arts Awards	2023	Best Film	Decision to Leave	Nominated	
Baeksang Arts Awards	2023	Best Director	Decision to Leave	Won	
Baeksang Arts Awards	2023	Best Screenplay	Decision to Leave	Nominated	
Baeksang Arts Awards	2025	Best Film	Uprising	Nominated	
Baeksang Arts Awards	2025	Best Screenplay	Uprising	Won	
Baeksang Arts Awards	2026	Best Film	No Other Choice	Won	
Baeksang Arts Awards	2026	Best Director	No Other Choice	Nominated	
Bangkok International Film Festival	2003	Best Film	Oldboy	Nominated	
Bangkok International Film Festival	2003	Best Director (tied with Christophe Barratier for Les Choristes)	Oldboy	Won	
Bangkok International Film Festival	2005	Best Director	Lady Vengeance	Won	
Beautiful Art Awards (Shin Young-kyun Arts and Culture Foundation)	2025	Film Art Impression Award	—N/a	Won	
Belgian Film Critics Association	2003	Grand Prix	Oldboy	Won	
Bergen International Film Festival	2003	Audience Award	Oldboy	Won	
Berlin International Film Festival	2001	Golden Bear	Joint Security Area	Nominated	
Berlin International Film Festival	2007	Golden Bear	I'm a Cyborg, But That's OK	Nominated	
Berlin International Film Festival	2007	Alfred Bauer Prize	I'm a Cyborg, But That's OK	Won	
Berlin International Film Festival	2010	Alfred Bauer Award	I'm a Cyborg, But That's OK	Won	
Berlin International Film Festival	2011	Golden Bear for Best Short Film	Night Fishing	Won	
Black Film Critics Circle	2025	Top Ten Films of 2025	No Other Choice	5th Place	
Blue Dragon Film Awards	2000	Best Film	Joint Security Area	Won	
Blue Dragon Film Awards	2000	Best Director	Joint Security Area	Won	
Blue Dragon Film Awards	2002	Best Film	Sympathy for Mr. Vengeance	Nominated	
Blue Dragon Film Awards	2002	Best Director	Sympathy for Mr. Vengeance	Nominated	
Blue Dragon Film Awards	2003	Best Director	Oldboy	Won	
Blue Dragon Film Awards	2005	Best Film	Lady Vengeance	Won	
Blue Dragon Film Awards	2005	Best Director	Lady Vengeance	Won	
Blue Dragon Film Awards	2009	Best Film	Thirst	Nominated	
Blue Dragon Film Awards	2009	Best Director	Thirst	Nominated	
Blue Dragon Film Awards	2016	Best Film	The Handmaiden	Nominated	
Blue Dragon Film Awards	2016	Best Director	The Handmaiden	Nominated	
Blue Dragon Film Awards	2022	Best Director	Decision to Leave	Won	
Blue Dragon Film Awards	2022	Best Film	Decision to Leave	Won	
Blue Dragon Film Awards	2022	Best Screenplay	Decision to Leave	Won	
Blue Dragon Film Awards	2025	Best Film	No Other Choice	Won	
Blue Dragon Film Awards	2025	Best Director	No Other Choice	Won	
Blue Dragon Film Awards	2025	Best Screenplay	No Other Choice	Nominated	
Blue Dragon Film Awards	2025	Best Screenplay	Uprising	Nominated	
Blue Ribbon Awards	2001	Best Foreign Film	Joint Security Area	Won	
Boston Online Film Critics Association	2025	Top Ten Films of 2025	No Other Choice	4th Place	
Boston Online Film Critics Association	2025	Best International Film	No Other Choice	Won	
Boston Society of Film Critics	2016	Best Foreign Language Film	The Handmaiden	Won	
British Academy Film Awards	2018	Best Film Not in the English Language	The Handmaiden	Won	
British Academy Film Awards	2023	Best Director	Decision to Leave	Nominated	
British Academy Film Awards	2023	Best Film Not in the English Language	Decision to Leave	Nominated	
British Academy Film Awards	2023	Best Original Screenplay	Decision to Leave	Longlisted	
British Academy Film Awards	2026	Best Film Not in the English Language	No Other Choice	Longlisted	
British Independent Film Awards	2003	Best Foreign Independent Film	Oldboy	Won	
British Independent Film Awards	2022	Best International Independent Film	Decision to Leave	Nominated	
Brussels International Fantastic Film Festival	2010	Silver Raven	Thirst	Won	
Brussels International Fantastic Film Festival	2017	Knight of the Raven	—N/a	Honored	
Buil Film Awards	2016	Best Film	The Handmaiden	Nominated	
Buil Film Awards	2016	Best Director	The Handmaiden	Nominated	
Buil Film Awards	2016	Buil Readers' Jury Award	The Handmaiden	Won	
Buil Film Awards	2022	Best Film	Decision to Leave	Won	
Buil Film Awards	2022	Best Director	Decision to Leave	Nominated	
Buil Film Awards	2022	Best Screenplay	Decision to Leave	Nominated	
Buil Film Awards	2025	Best Film	Uprising	Nominated	
Buil Film Awards	2025	Best Screenplay	Uprising	Nominated	
Buil Film Awards	2026	Best Film	No Other Choice	Nominated	
Buil Film Awards	2026	Best Director	No Other Choice	Nominated	
Busan Film Critics Awards	2002	Best Film	Sympathy for Mr. Vengeance	Won	
Busan Film Critics Awards	2002	Best Director	Sympathy for Mr. Vengeance	Won	
Cannes Film Festival	2003	Palme d'Or	Oldboy	Nominated	
Cannes Film Festival	2003	Grand Prix	Oldboy	Won	
Cannes Film Festival	2009	Jury Prize	Thirst	Won	
Cannes Film Festival	2009	Palme d'Or	Thirst	Nominated	
Cannes Film Festival	2016	Palme d'Or	The Handmaiden	Nominated	
Cannes Film Festival	2016	Queer Palm	The Handmaiden	Nominated	
Cannes Film Festival	2022	Best Director	Decision to Leave	Won	
Cannes Film Festival	2022	Palme d'Or	Decision to Leave	Nominated	
Chicago Film Critics Association Awards	2003	Best Foreign Language Film	Oldboy	Nominated	
Chicago Film Critics Association Awards	2016	Best Film	The Handmaiden	Nominated	
Chicago Film Critics Association Awards	2016	Best Director	The Handmaiden	Nominated	
Chicago Film Critics Association Awards	2016	Best Adapted Screenplay	The Handmaiden	Won	
Chicago Film Critics Association Awards	2016	Best Foreign Language Film	The Handmaiden	Won	
Chicago Film Critics Association Awards	2022	Best Director	Decision to Leave	Nominated	
Chicago Film Critics Association Awards	2022	Best Film	Decision to Leave	Nominated	
Chicago Film Critics Association Awards	2022	Best Foreign Language Film	Decision to Leave	Won	
Chicago Film Critics Association Awards	2025	Best Adapted Screenplay	No Other Choice	Nominated	
Chicago Film Critics Association Awards	2025	Best Foreign Language Film	No Other Choice	Nominated	
Chicago Indie Critics	2026	Best International Film	No Other Choice	Nominated	
Chunsa Film Art Awards	2009	Best Director	Thirst	Won	
Chunsa Film Art Awards	2017	Best Director	The Handmaiden	Won	
Chunsa Film Art Awards	2022	Best Director	Decision to Leave	Won	
Chunsa Film Art Awards	2022	Best Screenplay	Decision to Leave	Nominated	
Columbus Film Critics Association	2026	Best Film	No Other Choice	2nd Place	
Columbus Film Critics Association	2026	Best Foreign Language Film	No Other Choice	Runner-up	
Columbus Film Critics Association	2026	Best Adapted Screenplay	No Other Choice	Runner-up	
Critics Association Of Central Florida	2026	Best International Film	No Other Choice	Won	
Critics Choice Awards Asian Pacific Cinema & Television	2022	Director Award	Decision to Leave	Won	
Critics' Choice Movie Award	2003	Best Foreign Language Film	Oldboy	Nominated	
Critics' Choice Movie Award	2016	Best Foreign Language Film	The Handmaiden	Nominated	
Critics' Choice Movie Award	2023	Best Foreign Language Film	Decision to Leave	Nominated	
Critics' Choice Movie Award	2026	Best Adapted Screenplay	No Other Choice	Nominated	
Critics' Choice Movie Award	2026	Best Foreign Language Film	No Other Choice	Nominated	
Dallas–Fort Worth Film Critics Association	2016	Best Foreign Language Film	The Handmaiden	Won	
Dallas–Fort Worth Film Critics Association	2022	Best Foreign Language Film	Decision to Leave	Won	
Dallas–Fort Worth Film Critics Association	2025	Best Foreign Language Film	No Other Choice	4th Place	
Deauville Asian Film Festival	2001	Lotus d'Or (Prix du Jury) ("Jury Prize")	Joint Security Area	Won	
Deauville Asian Film Festival	2001	Lotus du Public (Prix du Public) ("Popular Choice")	Joint Security Area	Won	
Denver Film Critics Society	2025	Best Non-English Language Feature	No Other Choice	Nominated	
Director's Cut Awards	2002	Best Director	Sympathy for Mr. Vengeance	Won	
Director's Cut Awards	2003	Best Director	Oldboy	Won	
Director's Cut Awards	2009	Best Director	Thirst	Won	
Director's Cut Awards	2023	Best Director in film	Decision to Leave	Won	
Director's Cut Awards	2023	Best Screenplay	Decision to Leave	Won	
Director's Cut Awards	2026	Best Director (Film)	No Other Choice	Won	
Director's Cut Awards	2026	Best Screenplay (Film)	No Other Choice	Nominated	
DiscussingFilm's Global Film Critics Awards	2026	Best Picture	No Other Choice	Bronze	
DiscussingFilm's Global Film Critics Awards	2026	Best Adapted Screenplay	No Other Choice	Bronze	
DiscussingFilm's Global Film Critics Awards	2026	Best Director	No Other Choice	Silver	
Dorian Awards	2017	Director of the Year	The Handmaiden	Nominated	
Dorian Awards	2017	Foreign Language Film of the Year	The Handmaiden	Won	
Dorian Awards	2017	LGBTQ Film of the Year	The Handmaiden	Nominated	
Dorian Awards	2017	Visually Striking Film of the Year	The Handmaiden	Nominated	
Dorian Awards	2026	Non-English Language Film of the Year	No Other Choice	Nominated	
Dublin Film Critics' Circle	2022	Best Director	Decision to Leave	8th place	
Dublin Film Critics' Circle	2022	Best Screenplay	Decision to Leave	4th place	
Empire Awards	2018	Best Thriller	The Handmaiden	Nominated	
European Film Awards	2004	Best Non-European Film	Oldboy	Nominated	
European Film Awards	2005	Screen International	Lady Vengeance	Nominated	
Fantasia International Film Festival	2009	Best Asian Film	Thirst	Bronze	
Festival du nouveau cinéma de Montréal	2007	Audience Award	I'm a Cyborg, But That's OK	Won	
Florida Film Critics Circle	2016	Best Foreign Language Film	The Handmaiden	Runner-up	
Florida Film Critics Circle	2022	Best Director	Decision to Leave	Won	
Florida Film Critics Circle	2022	Best Foreign Language Film	Decision to Leave	Won	
Florida Film Critics Circle	2022	Best Original Screenplay	Decision to Leave	Won	
Florida Film Critics Circle	2022	Best Picture	Decision to Leave	Runner-up	
Florida Film Critics Circle	2025	Best Picture	No Other Choice	Runner-up	
Florida Film Critics Circle	2025	Best Director	No Other Choice	Won	
Florida Film Critics Circle	2025	Best Adapted Screenplay	No Other Choice	Runner-up	
Florida Film Critics Circle	2025	Best International Film	No Other Choice	Won	
Georgia Film Critics Association	2023	Best Director	Decision to Leave	Nominated	
Georgia Film Critics Association	2023	Best International Film	Decision to Leave	Runner-Up	
Georgia Film Critics Association	2023	Best Picture	Decision to Leave	Nominated	
Georgia Film Critics Association	2025	Best International Film	No Other Choice	Runner-up	
Georgia Film Critics Association	2025	Best Adapted Screenplay	No Other Choice	Nominated	
Gold Derby Film Awards	2026	Best International Feature	No Other Choice	Nominated	
Gold Derby Film Awards	2026	Best Adapted Screenplay	No Other Choice	Nominated	
Golden Bauhinia Awards	2005	Top 10 Foreign Language Films	Oldboy	Won	
Golden Bauhinia Awards	2006	Top 10 Foreign Language Films	Lady Vengeance	Won	
Golden Cinematography Awards	2022	Best Director	Decision to Leave	Won	
Golden Globe Awards	2023	Best Motion Picture – Foreign Language	Decision to Leave	Nominated	
Golden Globe Awards	2026	Best Motion Picture – Musical or Comedy	No Other Choice	Nominated	
Golden Globe Awards	2026	Best Foreign Language Film	No Other Choice	Nominated	
Golden Tomato Awards	2026	Best Limited Movies	No Other Choice	Nominated	
Golden Tomato Awards	2026	Best International	No Other Choice	Nominated	
Golden Trailer Awards	2003	Best Foreign Action Trailer (tied with District 13)	Oldboy	Won	
Gotham Independent Film Awards	2022	Best International Feature	Decision to Leave	Nominated	
Gotham Independent Film Awards	2025	Best Adapted Screenplay	No Other Choice	Nominated	
Gotham Independent Film Awards	2025	Best International Feature	No Other Choice	Nominated	
Gotham TV Awards	2024	Breakthrough Limited Series	The Sympathizer	Nominated	
Grand Bell Awards	2001	Best Film	Joint Security Area	Won	
Grand Bell Awards	2003	Best Film	Oldboy	Nominated	
Grand Bell Awards	2003	Best Director	Oldboy	Won	
Grand Bell Awards	2003	Best Adapted Screenplay	Oldboy	Nominated	
Grand Bell Awards	2006	Best Film	Lady Vengeance	Nominated	
Grand Bell Awards	2006	Best Director	Lady Vengeance	Nominated	
Grand Bell Awards	2022	Best Film	Decision to Leave	Won	
Grand Bell Awards	2022	Best Screenplay	Decision to Leave	Won	
Grand Bell Awards	2022	Best Director	Decision to Leave	Nominated	
Greater Western New York Film Critics Association	2026	Best Picture	No Other Choice	Nominated	
Greater Western New York Film Critics Association	2026	Best Foreign Language Film	No Other Choice	Nominated	
Greater Western New York Film Critics Association	2026	Best Adapted Screenplay	No Other Choice	Nominated	
Hawaii Film Critics Society	2026	Best Foreign Language Film	No Other Choice	Nominated	
Hollywood Critics Association Awards	2023	Best Director	Decision to Leave	Nominated	
Hollywood Critics Association Awards	2023	Best International Film	Decision to Leave	Nominated	
Hong Kong Film Awards	2003	Best Asian Film	Oldboy	Won	
Hong Kong Film Awards	2006	Best Asian Film	Lady Vengeance	Nominated	
Houston Film Critics Society	2017	Best Picture	The Handmaiden	Nominated	
Houston Film Critics Society	2017	Best Foreign Language Film	The Handmaiden	Won	
Houston Film Critics Society	2023	Best Foreign Language Feature	Decision to Leave	Nominated	
Houston Film Critics Society	2026	Best Foreign Language Feature	No Other Choice	Nominated	
Indiana Film Journalists Association	2025	Best Film	No Other Choice	Top 10	
Indiana Film Journalists Association	2025	Best Foreign Language Film	No Other Choice	Won	
IndieWire Critics Poll	2016	Best Film	The Handmaiden	7th Place	
IndieWire Critics Poll	2016	Best Director	The Handmaiden	5th Place	
International Cinephile Society	2026	Best Adapted Screenplay	No Other Choice	Nominated	
Italian Film Noir Festival	2002	Special Jury Award	Sympathy for Mr. Vengeance	Won	
Jerusalem Film Festival	2022	Best International Film	Decision to Leave	Nominated	
KALH Honors	2025	Visionary Filmmaker honor	—N/a	Honored	
Kansas City Film Critics Circle	2025	Best Foreign Language Film	No Other Choice	Nominated	
Korean Association of Film Critics Awards	2002	Best Director	Sympathy for Mr. Vengeance	Won	
Korean Association of Film Critics Awards	2002	Best Screenplay	Sympathy for Mr. Vengeance	Won	
Korean Association of Film Critics Awards	2016	Top Ten Films of the Year	The Handmaiden	Won	
Korean Association of Film Critics Awards	2022	Best Director	Decision to Leave	Won	
Korean Association of Film Critics Awards	2022	Best Picture	Decision to Leave	Won	
Korean Association of Film Critics Awards	2022	Best Screenplay	Decision to Leave	Won	
Korean Association of Film Critics Awards	2022	Korean Association of Film 10 selections of Kim Hyun-seung	Decision to Leave	Won	
Korean Association of Film Critics Awards	2025	FIPRESCI Award (Domestic)	No Other Choice	Won	
Korean Film Awards	2003	Best Film	Oldboy	Won	
Korean Film Awards	2003	Best Director	Oldboy	Won	
Korean Film Producers Association Award	2022	Best Film	Decision to Leave	Won	
Korean Film Producers Association Award	2022	Best Screenplay	Decision to Leave	Won	
LACMA Art + Film Gala	2022	Art+Film Gala	Decision to Leave	Won	
Las Vegas Film Critics Society	2025	Best Foreign Language Film	No Other Choice	Nominated	
Las Vegas Film Critics Society	2025	Best Adapted Screenplay	No Other Choice	Nominated	
London Film Critics' Circle	2018	Foreign Language Film of the Year	The Handmaiden	Nominated	
London Film Critics' Circle	2023	Director of the Year	Decision to Leave	Nominated	
London Film Critics' Circle	2023	Film of the Year	Decision to Leave	Nominated	
London Film Critics' Circle	2023	Foreign Language Film of the Year	Decision to Leave	Won	
London Film Critics' Circle	2026	Foreign Language Film of the Year	No Other Choice	Nominated	
Los Angeles Film Critics Association Awards	2016	Best Foreign Language Film	The Handmaiden	Won	
Marie Claire Asia Star Awards	2026	NETPAC Aruna Vasudev Award	—N/a	Honored	
Marrakech International Film Festival	2009	Gold Star Award	—N/a	Honored	
Melbourne International Film Festival	2016	Most Popular Feature Film	The Handmaiden	Runner-up	
Miami Film Festival	2025	Master of the Precious Gem Award	—N/a	Honored	
Midnight Critics Circle	2026	Best Picture	No Other Choice	Nominated	
Midnight Critics Circle	2026	Best International Feature	No Other Choice	Nominated	
Midnight Critics Circle	2026	Best Director	No Other Choice	Nominated	
Midnight Critics Circle	2026	Best Adapted Screenplay	No Other Choice	Runner-up	
Minnesota Film Critics Association	2026	Best International Feature	No Other Choice	Nominated	
Minnesota Film Critics Association	2026	Best Adapted Screenplay	No Other Choice	Nominated	
Miskolc International Film Festival	2022	Emeric Pressburger Prize	Decision to Leave	Nominated	
Music City Film Critics Association	2026	Best International Feature Film	No Other Choice	Nominated	
National Board of Review Awards	2017	Top 5 Foreign Films	The Handmaiden	Won	
National Board of Review Awards	2022	Top Five Foreign Language Films	Decision to Leave	Won	
National Society of Film Critics	2017	Best Foreign Language Film	The Handmaiden	2nd Place	
National Society of Film Critics	2023	Best Director	Decision to Leave	Runner-up	
National Society of Film Critics	2023	Best Foreign Language Film	Decision to Leave	3rd place	
New Jersey Film Critics Circle	2025	Best Picture	No Other Choice	Nominated	
New Jersey Film Critics Circle	2025	Best International Film	No Other Choice	Won	
New Jersey Film Critics Circle	2025	Best Director	No Other Choice	Nominated	
New Jersey Film Critics Circle	2025	Best Adapted Screenplay	No Other Choice	Runner-up	
New York Film Critics Online	2016	Best Foreign Language Film	The Handmaiden	Won	
New York Film Critics Online	2025	Best Picture	No Other Choice	Nominated	
New York Film Critics Online	2025	Best International Feature	No Other Choice	Nominated	
New York Film Critics Online	2025	Best Director	No Other Choice	Nominated	
Newport Beach Film Festival	2025	Global Impact Award	—N/a	Honored	
Newport Beach Film Festival	2025	Outstanding International Feature	No Other Choice	Won	
North Carolina Film Critics Association	2026	Best Narrative Film	No Other Choice	Nominated	
North Carolina Film Critics Association	2026	Best Foreign Language Film	No Other Choice	Nominated	
North Carolina Film Critics Association	2026	Best Director	No Other Choice	Nominated	
North Carolina Film Critics Association	2026	Best Adapted Screenplay	No Other Choice	Nominated	
North Dakota Film Society	2026	Best International Feature Film	No Other Choice	Nominated	
North Texas Film Critics Association	2025	Best Foreign Language Film	No Other Choice	Nominated	
Online Association Of Female Film Critics	2025	Best International Film	No Other Choice	Nominated	
Online Association Of Female Film Critics	2025	Best Adapted Screenplay	No Other Choice	Nominated	
The Online Film & Television Association	2026	Best Foreign Language Film	No Other Choice	Nominated	
Online Film Critics Society	2003	Best Foreign Language Film	Oldboy	Nominated	
Online Film Critics Society	2017	Best Picture	The Handmaiden	Nominated	
Online Film Critics Society	2017	Best Foreign Language Film	The Handmaiden	Won	
Online Film Critics Society	2023	Best Film Not in the English Language	Decision to Leave	Won	
Online Film Critics Society	2026	Best Picture	No Other Choice	8th Place	
Online Film Critics Society	2026	Best Film Not in the English Language	No Other Choice	Nominated	
Online Film Critics Society	2026	Best Adapted Screenplay	No Other Choice	Nominated	
Oporto International Film Festival	2005	Best Picture	Oldboy	Won	
Oporto International Film Festival	2005	Best Adapted Screenplay	Oldboy	Won	
Oporto International Film Festival	2006	Best Picture	Lady Vengeance	Won	
Oslo Films from the South Festival	2019	Silver Mirror	—N/a	Won	
Oslo Films from the South Festival	2022	Silver Mirror	Decision to Leave	Nominated	
Palm Springs International Film Festival	2023	Best International Feature Film	Decision to Leave	Nominated	
Palm Springs International Film Festival	2026	Best International Feature Film	No Other Choice	Nominated	
Phoenix Critics Circle	2025	Best Foreign Language Film	No Other Choice	Nominated	
Phoenix Critics Circle	2025	Best Director	No Other Choice	Nominated	
Phoenix Film Critics Society	2025	Best Foreign Language Film	No Other Choice	Won	
Portland Critics Association	2025	Best Picture	No Other Choice	Nominated	
Portland Critics Association	2025	Best Film Not in the English Language	No Other Choice	Won	
Portland Critics Association	2025	Top 10 Films of 2025	No Other Choice	Placed	
Portland Critics Association	2025	Best Screenplay	No Other Choice	Nominated	
Portland Critics Association	2025	Best Director	No Other Choice	Nominated	
9th Proud Sogang Award	2005	Sogang Award	Lady Vengeance	Won	
Puerto Rico Critics Association	2026	Best Comedy/Musical	No Other Choice	Nominated	
Puerto Rico Critics Association	2026	Best International Film	No Other Choice	Nominated	
Puerto Rico Critics Association	2026	Best Adapted Screenplay	No Other Choice	Nominated	
Royal Salute	2005	Mark of Respect Award	Lady Vengeance	Won	
San Diego Film Critics Society	2016	Best Foreign Language Film	The Handmaiden	Nominated	
San Diego Film Critics Society	2023	Best International Film	Decision to Leave	Nominated	
San Francisco Bay Area Film Critics Circle	2023	Best International Feature Film	Decision to Leave	Won	
San Francisco Bay Area Film Critics Circle	2025	Best International Feature Film	No Other Choice	Nominated	
San Francisco Bay Area Film Critics Circle	2025	Best Adapted Screenplay	No Other Choice	Nominated	
San Francisco Film Critics Circle Awards	2016	Best Adapted Screenplay	The Handmaiden	Nominated	
San Francisco Film Critics Circle Awards	2016	Best Foreign Language Film	The Handmaiden	Won	
Satellite Awards	2001	Jury Special Award	Joint Security Area	Won	
Satellite Awards	2017	Best Foreign Language Film	The Handmaiden	Nominated	
Satellite Awards	2022	Best Motion Picture – International	Decision to Leave	Nominated	
Satellite Awards	2025	Best Miniseries & Limited Series or Motion Picture Made for Television	The Sympathizer	Nominated	
Satellite Awards	2026	Best International Film	No Other Choice	Nominated	
Satellite Awards	2026	Best Adapted Screenplay	No Other Choice	Nominated	
Saturn Awards	2003	Best Action or Adventure Film	Oldboy	Nominated	
Saturn Awards	2003	Best DVD or Blu-ray Special Edition Release	Oldboy	Nominated	
Saturn Awards	2013	Best International Film	Stoker	Nominated	
Saturn Awards	2017	Best International Film	The Handmaiden	Won	
Savannah Film Festival	2025	International Auteur Award	—N/a	Honored	
Savannah Film Festival	2025	International Audience Award	No Other Choice	Won	
Seattle Film Critics Society Awards	2017	Best Picture of the Year	The Handmaiden	Nominated	
Seattle Film Critics Society Awards	2017	Best Foreign Language Film	The Handmaiden	Nominated	
Seattle Film Critics Society Awards	2023	Best Film Not in the English Language	Decision to Leave	Won	
Seattle Film Critics Society Awards	2023	Best Picture	Decision to Leave	Nominated	
Seattle Film Critics Society Awards	2023	Best Screenplay	Decision to Leave	Nominated	
Seattle Film Critics Society Awards	2025	Best International Feature	No Other Choice	Nominated	
Seoul International Drama Awards	2024	Golden Bird Prize	The Sympathizer	Won	
SFFILM	2025	Career Tribute Award	—N/a	Honored	
Sitges Film Festival	2003	Best Film	Oldboy	Won	
Sitges Film Festival	2003	José Luis Guarner Critic's Award	Oldboy	Won	
Sitges Film Festival	2025	Best Feature Film	No Other Choice	Nominated	
Sitges Film Festival	2025	Best Director	No Other Choice	Won	
Spikes Asia	2011	Film Craft	Night Fishing	Silver	
St. Louis Film Critics Association	2016	Best Foreign Language Film	The Handmaiden	Runner-up	
St. Louis Film Critics Association	2022	Best International Film	Decision to Leave	Won	
St. Louis Film Critics Association	2022	Best Original Screenplay	Decision to Leave	Nominated	
St. Louis Film Critics Association	2025	Best International Feature Film	No Other Choice	Nominated	
Stockholm International Film Festival	2003	Audience Award	Oldboy	Won	
Stockholm International Film Festival	2025	FIPRESCI Award	No Other Choice	Won	
Sunset Circle Awards	2022	Best Director	Decision to Leave	Nominated	
Sunset Circle Awards	2022	Best Screenplay	Decision to Leave	Nominated	
Sunset Circle Awards	2022	Best Film	Decision to Leave	Nominated	
Sunset Circle Awards	2022	Best International Feature	Decision to Leave	Runner-up	
Tokyo International Film Festival	2002	Special Mention	Sympathy for Mr. Vengeance	Won	
Toronto Film Critics Association	2016	Best Foreign Language Film	The Handmaiden	Runner-up	
Toronto Film Critics Association	2023	Best International Feature Film	Decision to Leave	Runner-up	
Toronto Film Critics Association	2025	Best Adapted Screenplay	No Other Choice	Runner-up	
Toronto International Film Festival	2025	International People's Choice Award	No Other Choice	Won	
Udine Far East Film Festival	2002	Audience Award	Sympathy for Mr. Vengeance	Won	
Unforgettable Awards	2026	Director Award	—N/a	Honored	
Utah Film Critics Association	2026	Best Non-English Language Feature	No Other Choice	Nominated	
Valladolid International Film Festival	2022	Golden Spike (Best Picture)	Decision to Leave	Nominated	
Vancouver Film Critics Circle	2016	Best Foreign Language Film	The Handmaiden	Nominated	
Venice International Film Festival	2005	Golden Lion	Lady Vengeance	Nominated	
Venice International Film Festival	2005	Little Golden Lion	Lady Vengeance	Won	
Venice International Film Festival	2005	Young Cinema Award: Alternatives	Lady Vengeance	Won	
Venice International Film Festival	2005	'CinemAvvenire' Award: Best Film in Competition	Lady Vengeance	Won	
Venice International Film Festival	2025	Golden Lion	No Other Choice	Nominated	
Visionary Awards (Note: Visionary Awards, which started in 2020, selects and awards people who lead roles in the Korean entertainment industry. It highlights the meaning and achievements of a person whose chosen trend keywords penetrated the entertainment industry, including broadcasting, movies, music, and performances, and presents the next vision of the cultural sector with outstanding achievements and influence.)	2023	2023 Visionary	—N/a	Won	
Washington D.C. Area Film Critics Association	2016	Best Foreign Language Film	The Handmaiden	Nominated	
Washington D.C. Area Film Critics Association	2022	Best International/Foreign Language Film	Decision to Leave	Won	
Washington D.C. Area Film Critics Association	2025	Foreign Language Film	No Other Choice	Nominated	
Women Film Critics Circle	2016	Best Foreign Film by or about Women	The Handmaiden	Won	

== State honors ==
Name of country, award ceremony, year given, and name of honor or award
Country	Ceremony	Year	Honor or Award	Ref.
France	Ordre des Arts et des Lettres	2026	Commandeur	
South Korea	Culture Day Award Ceremony	2000	Today's Young Artist Award — Film; Minister's Office of Culture and Tourism Commendation	
South Korea	Korea Cultural Contents Export Merit Ceremony	2006	Presidential Citation	
South Korea	Korean Popular Culture and Arts Awards (Note: Since 2020, Honors are given at the Korean Popular Culture and Arts Awards, arranged by the Korea Creative Content Agency and hosted by the Ministry of Culture, Sports and Tourism. They are awarded to those who have contributed to the arts and South Korea's pop culture.)	2022	Eugwan Order of Cultural Merit	
South Korea	Minister's Office of Culture and Tourism Award Ceremony	2004	Bogwan Order of Cultural Merit	

== Listicles ==
Name of publisher, year listed, name of listicle, and placement
Publisher	Year	Listicle	Placement	Ref.
Hankyoreh	2004	100 people who will open the future of Korea	15th	
Herald Business Daily	2008	Pop Culture Power Leader Big 30	11th	
Korea Newspaper Journalists Association	2025	100 Great Koreans Awards	Included	
Korea Newspaper Journalists Association	2026	K-Culture 100 Great Koreans Awards	Included	
Sisa Journal	2005	Most Influential Person in the Entertainment Industry	9th	
Sisa Journal	2008	Next Generation Leader — Film Industry	1st	
Sisa Journal	2009	Next Generation Leader — Film Industry	1st	
Sisa Journal	2015	Next Generation Leader — Pop Culture	7th	
Sisa Journal	2017	Next Generation Leader — Culture, Arts, Sports	22nd (Note: Tied with Ryoo Seung-wan)	
Sisa Journal	2018	Korea's Most Influential Cultural Artists	6th	
Sisa Journal	2019	Korea's Most Influential Cultural Artists	6th	
Sisa Journal	2020	Korea's Most Influential Cultural Artists	3rd	
Sisa Journal	2021	Korea's Most Influential Cultural Artists	5th	
Sisa Journal	2022	Korea's Most Influential Cultural Artists	2nd	
Sisa Journal	2023	Korea's Most Influential Cultural Artists	3rd	
