= Wu Rong-i =

Taiwanese economist and politician

- 吳榮義
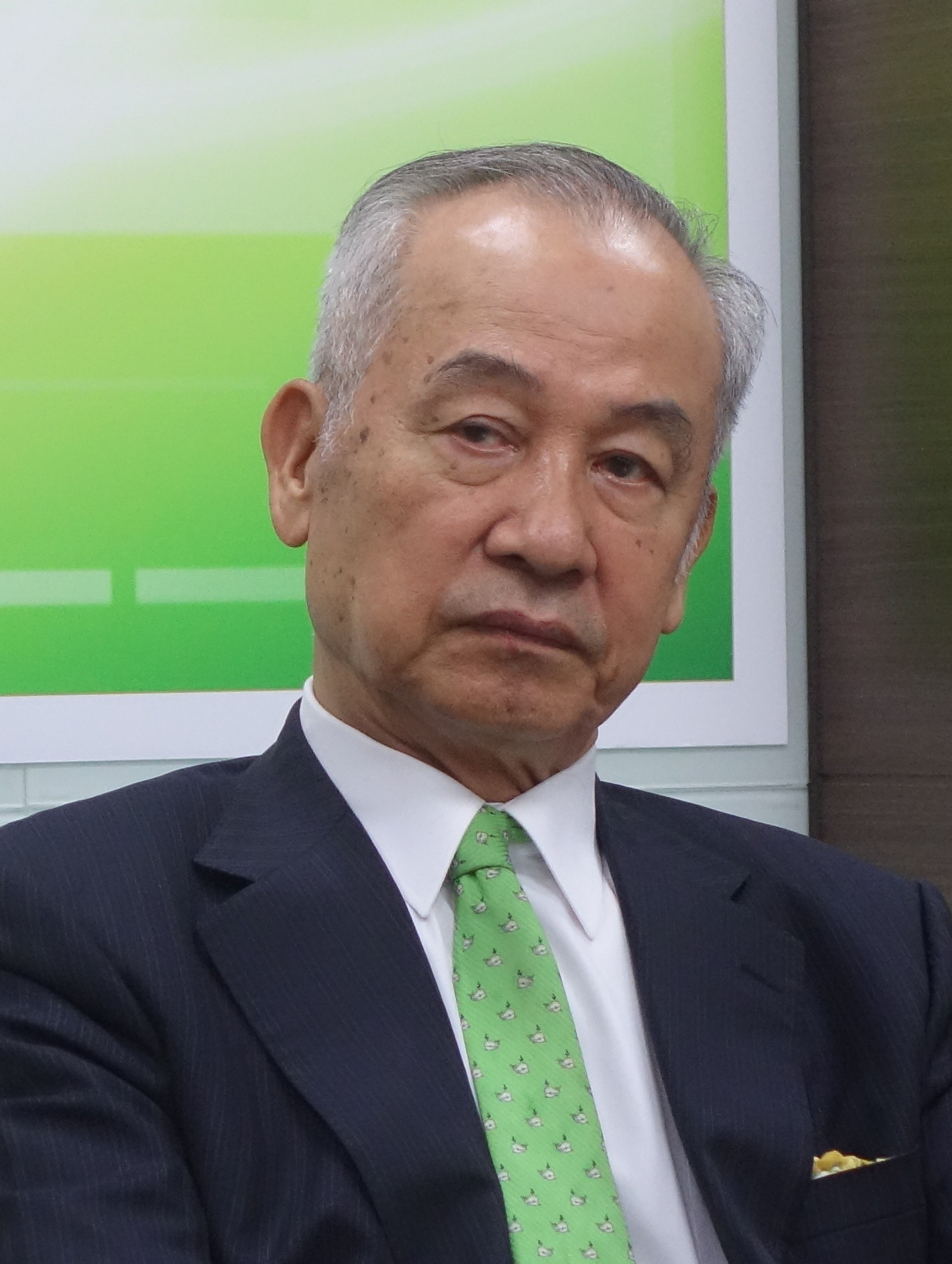
- Wu in 2014

Senior Advisor to the President
- In office 9 November 2016 – 20 May 2024
- President: Tsai Ing-wen
- In office 26 January 2006 – July 2006
- President: Chen Shui-bian

21st Vice Premier of the Republic of China
- In office 1 February 2005 – 25 January 2006
- Premier: Frank Hsieh
- Preceded by: Yeh Chu-lan
- Succeeded by: Tsai Ing-wen

National Policy Advisor to the President
- In office 20 May 2001 – 1 February 2005
- President: Chen Shui-bian

Personal details
- Born: 15 December 1939 (age 86) Yanchao, Kaohsiung, Taiwan
- Party: Independent
- Children: Wu Chih-chung
- Education: National Taiwan University (BA, MA); KU Leuven (MSc, PhD)

Wu Rong-i (Chinese: 吳榮義; pinyin: Wú Róngyì; born 15 December 1939) is a Taiwanese economist and politician who served as the vice premier of the Republic of China from 2005 to 2006. He also served as Chairman of Taiwania Capital, the investment arm of Taiwan.

== Education ==
Wu graduated from National Taiwan University with a B.A. in economics in 1962 and an M.A. in economics in 1965. He then completed doctoral studies in Belgium, earning an M.Sc. in 1968 and his Ph.D. in economics in 1971, both from KU Leuven.

== Work ==
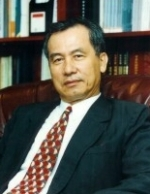
Official portrait as Deputy Prime Minister of Taiwan, 2005

From 1992 to 1993, Wu served as Commissioner and Member of the Fair Trade Commission. He became Director and President of the Taiwan Institute of Economic Research from 1993 until 2005, and from 2005 onwards he was Deputy Prime Minister (Vice Premier of the Executive Yuan) of Taiwan. From 2001 to 2005, Wu was President and Chairman of Taiwan Stock Exchange. He has also served as Chairman of Taiwan Brain Trust and Taiwan Futures Exchange, and as Advisor to the Taiwan delegation to the APEC Ministerial and Leaders' Meetings.

== Cross-strait relations ==
In October 2005, Wu said that Chinese unification is highly unlikely to happen during his lifetime unless Beijing uses force. However, he considers mainland China a big brother, and wishes to take the opportunity for Taiwanese to invest in the mainland and have peaceful relations with them.

In early October 2013 during the cross-strait peace forum in Shanghai in which attended by officials from the Chinese Communist Party, Pan-Blue Coalition and Pan-Green Coalition, Wu proposed the idea that Taiwan and mainland China represent an "allegiance of brotherhood".

== See also ==
- List of vice premiers of the Republic of China
- Notable Alumni of Catholic University of Leuven
