= Na Hyeon-hui =

South Korean actress and singer (born 1970)

- Born: September 20, 1970 (age 56); Boksan-dong, Dongnae District, Busan, South Korea
- Education: University of Suwon – Dance Major
- Occupations: Actress; singer
- Years active: 1991–present

Korean name
- Hangul: 나현희
- RR: Na Hyeonhui
- MR: Na Hyŏnhŭi

Na Hyeon-hui (Korean: 나현희, born September 20, 1970) is a South Korean actress and singer.

== Filmography ==
=== Television series ===
Year	Title	Role
1992	Sweetheart	Cha Kyung-ah
1992–1993	Women's Room	Hwa-jeong
1993	Fifteen in the Family	
1993	The Sorrow of the Survivor	Didi
1993–1994	Work and Love	Moon Eun-young
1994	Stranger in Paradise	Hwa-kyung
1994	Hidden Pictures	Go Myung-soon
1994	Drama City: "Woman in the Veil"	
1995	The Blue Sky	Noh Young-joo
1995	Mystery of Mirror Inside	Min-jeong
1996	Cute Lady	Mi-soon
1996	Bestseller Theatre: "Making People"	
1996	Man's Great Exploration	
1996	Bestseller Theatre: "The Second Saturday as Always"	Hye-young
1997	Song of the Single	Nam Mi-joo
2003	Garden of Eve	Yoon Shin-young
2004–2005	Age of Heroes	Park Hee-ra
2008	Aquarius	Jo Kyung-ran
2008–2009	East of Eden	Oh Yoon-hee

=== Film ===
Year	Title	Role
1992	The Moon Is... the Sun's Dream	Eun-joo

=== Variety show ===
Year	Title	Notes/Ref.
2016	Two Yoo Project Sugar Man	Guest as Sugar Man (Episode 29)

== Theater ==
Year	Title (Original title)
1995	Going to Be a Star (스타가 될거야)
1995	Baby Baby (베이비 베이비)
2002	Years of Mojeong (모정의 세월)
2002	Guys and Dolls (아가씨와 건달들)
2003	Trends in Bulhyoja (속 불효자는 웁니다)
2005	I Forgot His Name, But (그 사람 이름은 잊었지만)
2005	Carmen (카르멘)
2007	Dae Jang-geum (대장금)

== Broadcasting ==
Year	Title	Notes
1992	The March of Youth	MC
1995	Movie Music Room	DJ
2006	Queen of Salim	MC

== Discography ==
=== Studio album ===
Year	Album title	Notes
1993	After Stage	Official first album

=== Soundtrack appearances ===
Year	Film/TV series	Song title
1992	The Moon Is... the Sun's Dream	
1993	KBS2 The Sorrow of the Survivor	"I Am Only Too" (나는 너만을)
1993	KBS2 For Love	"I Am Not in Love Again" (다시 사랑하지 않을거야)
1993	SBS Work and Love	"Your Courage" (너의 용기)
1995	KBS2 The Blue Sky	"Sad Memories" (슬픈 추억) (ft. Kim Won-jun)
1995	SBS Mystery of Mirror Inside	"Into the Mirror of Mystery" (신비의 거울속으로)

== Awards and nominations ==
Year	Award	Category	Nominated work	Result
1992	KBS Drama Awards	Best New Actress	The Beloved	Nominated
1994	KBS Drama Awards	Excellence Award, Actress	Hidden Pictures	Nominated
1995	1st Korea Musical Awards	Acting Award	Going to Be a Star	Won
