= Joint Security Area (film) =

2000 South Korean mystery thriller by Park Chan-wook

- Theatrical release poster
- Hangul: 공동경비구역 JSA
- Hanja: 共同警備區域 JSA
- RR: Gongdong gyeongbi guyeok JSA
- MR: Kongdong kyŏngbi kuyŏk JSA
- Directed by: Park Chan-wook
- Written by: Kim Hyun-seok; Jeong Seong-san; Lee Moo-yeong; Park Chan-wook
- Based on: DMZ by Park Sang-yeon
- Produced by: Shim Jae-myung; Lee Eun
- Starring: Song Kang-ho; Lee Byung-hun; Lee Young-ae; Kim Tae-woo; Shin Ha-kyun
- Cinematography: Kim Seong-bok
- Edited by: Kim Sang-bum
- Music by: Jo Yeong-wook; Bang Jun-seok
- Production company: Myung Films
- Distributed by: CJ Entertainment
- Release date: 9 September 2000
- Running time: 110 minutes
- Country: South Korea
- Languages: Korean; English; French; German

Joint Security Area (Korean: 공동경비구역 JSA) is a 2000 South Korean mystery thriller film directed and co-written by Park Chan-wook and based on the novel DMZ by Park Sang-yeon. It is Park Chan-wook's third film as director, and is frequently regarded as his first film with creative control; as he largely disowned his first two films, The Moon Is... the Sun's Dream (1992) and Trio (1997), Park himself prefers the film to be regarded as his directorial debut.

Starring Song Kang-ho, Lee Byung-hun, Lee Young-ae, Kim Tae-woo, and Shin Ha-kyun, Joint Security Area is set in the eponymous Joint Security Area of the Korean Demilitarized Zone separating the countries of North Korea and South Korea and revolves around a fatal shooting incident involving soldiers from both sides, which leads the Neutral Nations Supervisory Commission to investigate and gradually unveil the unexpected truth.

The film was released theatrically on 9 September 2000 in South Korea where it became a major commercial success, launching Park's career and becoming the highest-grossing film in South Korean history until Friend (2001) surpassed it the following year. It was nominated for three Blue Dragon Film Awards, winning Best Film and Best Cinematography, and for thirteen Grand Bell Awards, winning Best Film, Best Actor for Song, Best Art Direction and Best Sound Effects.

== Plot ==
Two North Korean soldiers are killed in the Joint Security Area at a Northern guard house just across the Bridge of No Return. Sergeant Lee Soo-hyeok, a wounded South Korean soldier on border duties, flees back to the South and is picked up by Southern troops, while the two sides briefly exchange fire. Two days later, in an attempt to ease tensions between the two Koreas, Swiss Army Major Sophie E. Jean arrives to conduct a special investigation into the incident on behalf of the Neutral Nations Supervisory Commission.

While Soo-hyeok has confessed to the shootings, Sophie suspects something is amiss due to contradicting accounts of the events. Soo-hyeok states he was kidnapped and taken to the Northern guard house and, upon secretly freeing himself, shot three North Korean soldiers, leaving two dead. The North Korean survivor Sergeant Oh Kyeong-pil tells Sophie that Soo-hyeok barged into the guard house and shot everyone before retreating when the wounded Kyeong-pil returned fire.

Autopsy reports show that one North Korean soldier, Jeong Woo-jin, was shot eight times, suggesting a grudge; additionally, a single bullet is not accounted for. Over the course of the investigation, witness Private First Class Nam Sung-shik attempts suicide by jumping out of the window of the interrogation room. A strange emotional reaction between Kyeong-pil and Soo-hyeok during a meeting causes Sophie to confirm her suspicions that the surviving soldiers and Woo-jin held a mutual friendship and were attempting to protect one another.

Through flashbacks, it is shown that Soo-hyeok had been separated from a patrol in the North Korean side and partially tripped a mine. He is found and rescued by Kyeong-pil and Woo-jin. Over the next few weeks, the soldiers maintain contact by throwing written messages across the Bridge of No Return. Soo-hyeok is eventually invited to the Northern side and the three become a group of friends that soon includes Sung-shik, with the four agreeing to leave politics out of their friendship to remain loyal to their own countries.

As tensions rise between the North and South, Soo-hyeok and Sung-shik return to the Northern guard house one night to say goodbye and celebrate Woo-jin's birthday, only to be discovered by a commanding officer from the North. A panicked Woo-jin betrays his friends, resulting in a Mexican standoff. Kyeong-pil convinces all sides to lower their weapons, only for Sung-shik to panic and shoot the commanding officer when he reaches for his radio. When Woo-jin draws his gun again, Sung-shik shoots him and, in a daze, shoots his corpse several times. Kyeong-pil slaps Sung-shik out of his daze, takes the gun from him, and kills the still-alive officer. He then persuades Soo-hyeok and Sung-shik to come up with a false alibi of being kidnapped, before throwing away the evidence that he and Woo-jin were fraternizing with Southern soldiers. Soo-hyeok shoots Kyeong-pil in the shoulder to complete the alibi. While Sung-shik flees back across the border unseen, Soo-hyeok lags behind due to a wound sustained in the firefight and as such, he is the only soldier seen and picked up by the Southern troops.

Back in the present, Sophie is eventually removed from the case when it's discovered that her father was a former North Korean general, thus technically rendering her non-neutral. Before leaving, she reaches out first to Kyeong-pil and then to Soo-hyeok in an attempt to learn the truth of the incident. She gives Soo-hyeok a lighter he first gifted to Kyeong-pil, which the latter now gives back. She reveals that Kyeong-pil in fact saw Soo-hyeok shooting Woo-jin first during the chaos before Sung-shik shot him. On his way out, a guilt-ridden Soo-hyeok snatches an officer's pistol and commits suicide. The film concludes with an American tourist's photograph of the Joint Security Area that accidentally contains all four soldiers prior to the incident.

== Cast ==
- Song Kang-ho as Sgt. Oh Kyeong-pil (오경필)
- Lee Byung-hun as Sgt. Lee Soo-hyeok (이수혁)
- Lee Young-ae as Maj. Sophie E. Jean
- Kim Tae-woo as Pvt. Nam Sung-sik (남성식)
- Shin Ha-kyun as Pvt. Jung Woo-jin (정우진)
- Christoph Hofrichter as Maj. Gen. Bruno Botta
- Herbert Ulrich as Capt. Persson.

== Production ==
The Korean Demilitarized Zone depicted in the movie were sets that were made for the film, which was constructed at about 8000-Pyeong area in a film studio in Namyangju (Note: The Seoul film studio is a studio located in Namyangju despite the name.) with a budget of 900 million won.

== Reception ==
The film drew nearly half a million viewers in Seoul alone in its first week. Within 15 days of its release the film reached one million admissions and by early 2001 Joint Security Area had become the highest-grossing film in Korean film history. It was later passed by the films Friend, Silmido and Taegukgi: The Brotherhood of War. Overall, JSA had 2,499,400 admissions in Seoul over its 20 weeks in the cinemas and an estimated 5.8 million admissions nationwide. The film was also very successful in Japan where it grossed ¥1,160,000,000 becoming one of the top grossing foreign productions of 2001.

A DVD of the movie was presented to North Korea's leader Kim Jong Il by South Korea's President Roh Moo-hyun during the Korean summit in October 2007.

In 2009, director Quentin Tarantino named the film as one of his twenty favorite films since 1992.

== Awards and nominations ==
2000 Blue Dragon Film Awards

- Best Film
- Best Director – Park Chan-wook
- Best Supporting Actor – Shin Ha-kyun
- Best Cinematography – Kim Seong-bok

2000 Busan Film Critics Awards

- Best Actor – Lee Byung-hun, Song Kang-ho

2000 Director's Cut Awards

- Best Director – Park Chan-wook
- Best Actor – Song Kang-ho
- Best New Actor – Shin Ha-kyun
- Best Producer – Shim Jae-myung

2001 Deauville Asian Film Festival

- Lotus d'Or (Prix du Jury) ("Jury Prize")
- Lotus du Public (Prix du Public) ("Popular Choice")
- Lotus du Meilleur Acteur ("Best Actor") – Song Kang-ho

2001 Seattle International Film Festival

- New Director's Showcase Special Jury Prize

2001 Berlin International Film Festival

- Nomination – Golden Berlin Bear

2001 Baeksang Arts Awards

- Best Director – Park Chan-wook

2001 Grand Bell Awards

- Best Film
- Best Actor – Song Kang-ho
- Best Sound – Kim Seok-weon, Kim Won-yong
- Best Art Direction
- Nomination – Best Supporting Actor – Shin Ha-kyun

2001 Fantasia Festival

- Nomination – Best Film

2002 Blue Ribbon Awards

- Best Foreign Language Film

2003 Hong Kong Film Awards

- Nomination – Best Asian Film

2001 Woman in Film Korea Festival

- Nomination – Woman Filmmaker of the Year Award — Song Jong-hee
- Won – Technical Award — Song Jong-hee

== Adaptations ==
A stage musical titled JSA: the Musical opened in April 2014 at the Dongsoong Art Center in Seoul's theater district of Daehangno. While the musical heavily borrows from Park Chan-wook's film, the script more closely resembles DMZ, the novel by Park Sang-yeon that inspired the movie.

An eight-episode television miniseries also adapted from the novel DMZ will be produced by KBS, to be aired in September 2014 as part of the Drama Special Series.

== Bibliography ==
- Kim, Kyung-hyun (2004). "9. 'Each Man Kills the Thing He Loves': Transgressive Agents, National Security, and Blockbuster Aesthetics in Shiri and Joint Security Area". The Remasculinization of Korean Cinema. Durham and London: Duke University Press. pp. 259–276. ISBN 0822332671.
