= Daytrip =

Startup transportation network company

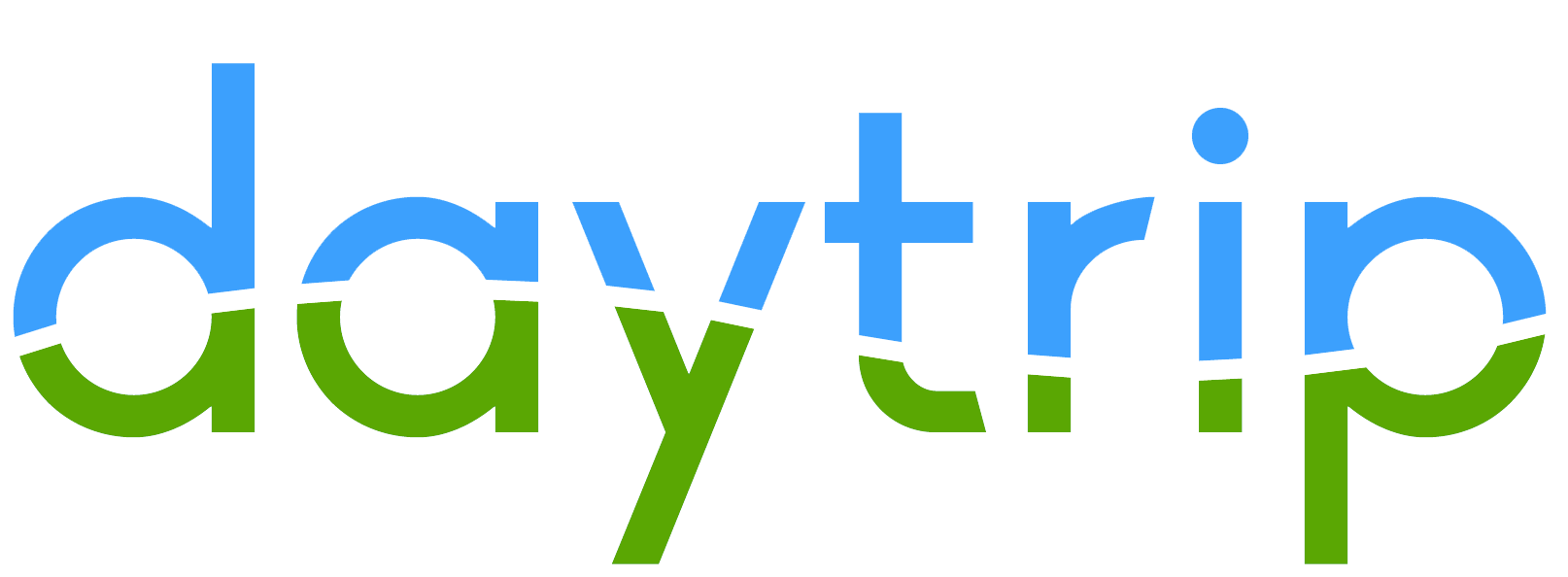
- Type: Private
- Industry: Travel, Transportation
- Founded: 2015
- Founder: Tomáš Turek, Markéta Bláhová, Valeriia Pshenychna, Jan Prokop, Jiří Sváček
- Headquarters: London, United Kingdom
- Area served: Europe, Southeast Asia, North America, South America, Australasia, India
- Number of employees: 70+
- Website: daytrip.com

Daytrip is a global travel company headquartered in Prague, Czech Republic. The company specializes in pre-booked, private, point-to-point car transfers with optional sightseeing stops, multi-city bookings, and day trips. Founded in 2015, Daytrip operates in over 130 countries across 6 continents, serving over 1 million travelers as of 2025. The platform connects passengers with over 10,000 English-speaking drivers through its online booking system and mobile applications.

== History ==
=== Timeline ===
- 2015 – Daytrip was founded by Tomáš Turek, Markéta Bláhová, Valeriia Pshenychna, Jan Prokop, and Jiří Sváček in Prague, Czech Republic.
- 2016 – The company expands across Europe.
- 2017 – sales reached 75 million Czech crowns (approximately $3.5 million). Nation 1 and J&T Ventures invested 16 million Czech crowns (approximately $770,000), with J&T Ventures contributing 600,000 euros.
- 2019 – served 100,000+ passengers in 60+ countries; revenue reached 400 million Czech crowns (approximately $19 million).
- 2020 – The company received 25 million Czech crowns (about $1.2 million) from Nation 1 and J&T Ventures and subsequently expanded into the United States.
- 2021 – the COVID-19 pandemic forced workforce reductions; support from venture fund Pale Fire Capital helped the company sustain operations and continue product development.
- 2022 - Daytrip closes a $6 million Series A funding round led by Euroventures alongside J&T Ventures, Nation 1 VC and Pale Fire Capital. The company served 400,000 passengers that year with 21 million euros in gross merchandise volume.
- 2023 – Daytrip expanded to over 110 countries, transported 350,000 passengers, and grew its driver network to over 7,000. Launched operations in the United States.
- January 2024 – Daytrip receives a €9.2 million Series B funding round led by Taiwania Capital, with participation from Euroventures and J&T Ventures.
- March 2024 – The company launches operations in India, announced at ITB Berlin 2024. It also expands operations to Arizona, alongside California, Florida, and Texas. It also expands operations to Arizona, alongside California, Florida, and Texas.
- 2025 – Operated in 130+ countries across six continents, with over 10,000 English-speaking drivers and up to 40,000 available travel routes. Daytrip introduces a new product, "day trips".

== Services ==
Daytrip’s core service is private intercity transfers with professional, local drivers, available through its online booking platform, mobile apps, and travel agency partners. Transfers are available through an online booking platform, mobile applications for iOS and Android, and partnerships with travel agencies and tour operators. Travelers provide pickup and drop-off locations through the platform, and confirmation details including driver identification, vehicle information, and contact details of an English-speaking driver are communicated prior to travel.

=== Transfer Services ===
Travelers can book one-way or round-trip transfers between two locations, with or without a guide, for individuals and groups. Sightseeing stops may be added along the route.

=== Multi-City Bookings ===
The platform supports booking of multiple connected transfers, allowing travelers to plan entire routes across multiple destinations with a single booking mechanism.

=== Day Trips ===
Beginning in March 2025, Daytrip launched a curated day trips product featuring over 1,000 pre-planned sightseeing and themed itineraries across more than 200 locations, primarily in Europe.

== Business Model ==
Daytrip operates on a hybrid B2C and B2B model. Travelers book directly through the website or mobile app, while host agencies, travel agents, travel agencies, and tour operators can access the platform through dedicated partner channels.

The company generates revenue through service fees charged per trip, with rates varying by country and service type. As of 2023, the company retains approximately 20 percent of gross transaction volume as company revenue, with the remainder compensating drivers and covering operational expenses.

Unlike ride-hailing services, Daytrip focuses on pre-booked, long-distance travel rather than on-demand city rides.

== Response to COVID-19 Pandemic ==
During the COVID-19 pandemic in 2020–2021, the global decline in tourism had a significant impact on Daytrip’s operations. The company reduced expenses and some staff but retained its core development team to continue work on the product.

Investments from Pale Fire Capital, Nation 1, and J&T Ventures helped maintain financial stability. By 2025, the company gradually restored its team size and operations after the pandemic period.

== Operations and Staffing ==
As of 2023, Daytrip employed over 70 people across multiple locations, including headquarters in Prague and regional offices in the Balkans, Italy, and Mexico. Approximately 20 regional managers oversee driver networks and local operations across geographic regions, with manager assignments varying by country size and driver concentration.

As of 2024, women comprise approximately 40 percent of Daytrip's workforce, higher than the 33 percent average female representation in the technology industry, according to a Deloitte study.

== Recognition and Awards ==
- Good Housekeeping Family Travel Award 2025 for services and transportation.
- Included in Sifted’s list of Central Europe’s fastest-growing startups and the Sifted 250 leaderboard (2024).
- TravelTech Breakthrough Awards 2025 winner.
