= Day Trip (film) =

- Hangul: 청출어람
- Hanja: 靑出於藍
- RR: Cheongchureoram
- MR: Ch'ŏngch'urŏram
- Directed by: Park Chan-wook; Park Chan-kyong
- Written by: Park Bae-il; Park Chan-wook; Park Chan-kyong
- Produced by: Park Chan-wook; Park Chan-kyong
- Starring: Song Kang-ho; Jeon Hyo-jung
- Edited by: Kim Sang-bum; Kim Jae-bum
- Release date: December 28, 2012
- Running time: 18 minutes
- Country: South Korea
- Language: Korean

Day Trip (Korean: 청출어람; RR: Cheongchureoram) is a 2012 South Korean short film co-directed by Park Chan-wook and Park Chan-kyong. The film features a pansori master (Song Kang-ho) and his student (Jeon Hyo-jung).

The 18-minute short was released online on December 28, 2012 on the website of outdoor clothing brand Kolon Sport, and was funded by the company to mark its 40th anniversary.

This is the second project by the duo dubbed collectively as "PARKing CHANce," composed of film director Park Chan-wook and his brother Park Chan-kyong, who is known for his installation art, photography and experimental films. Their previous collaboration Night Fishing, shot entirely with an iPhone 4, won Best Short Film at the Berlin International Film Festival in 2011.

== Plot ==
A master (Song Kang-ho) and his student (Jeon Hyo-jung) visit a mountain to practice pansori following a music competition that left the trainee disappointed.

== Production ==
The film was shot in four days, and most of the scenes took place at the mountain Namsan in Gyeongju, North Gyeongsang Province. The scenery served as the backdrop for the central pansori performances. Pansori is a genre of Korean folk music that harbors a range of emotions, including han, repressed bitterness and powerlessness that many say lingers in the Korean people. Day Trip highlights the traditional music's harmonious nature with the surrounding scenery by featuring a version of Sae Taryeong ("Song of Birds").

Outdoor clothing brand Kolon Sport had commissioned and funded the short for its 40th anniversary "Way to Nature Film Project." But the short has almost no promotional elements because the company gave the Parks directorial autonomy. Rather than rendering typical outdoor images, they focused on presenting pansori in harmony with the surrounding nature and civilization.

The characters' trip to the mountain appears to be part of a 100-day practice session required for pansori singers in which they train their voices in the unique acoustic setting of the waterfalls, cliffs and caves. They sing so loudly their voices usually go hoarse and their bodies swell until they feel blood in their throats. In recent years, this kind of training may be seen as a way to permanently injure vocal cords, but they pushed themselves in isolation for 100 days believing that the efforts would ultimately makes one's voice suitable for pansori.

The short was the debut film for 15-year-old Jeon Hyo-jung. The actress, a pansori major at the National Middle School of Traditional Arts, was selected for the role through a competitive audition. In order to play a man much older than himself, prior to each shoot actor Song Kang-ho had to undergo intense make-up sessions under make-up artist Song Jong-hee, who was previously recognized for her work on the film Eungyo.
