= Park Chan-wook =

South Korean filmmaker (born 1963)

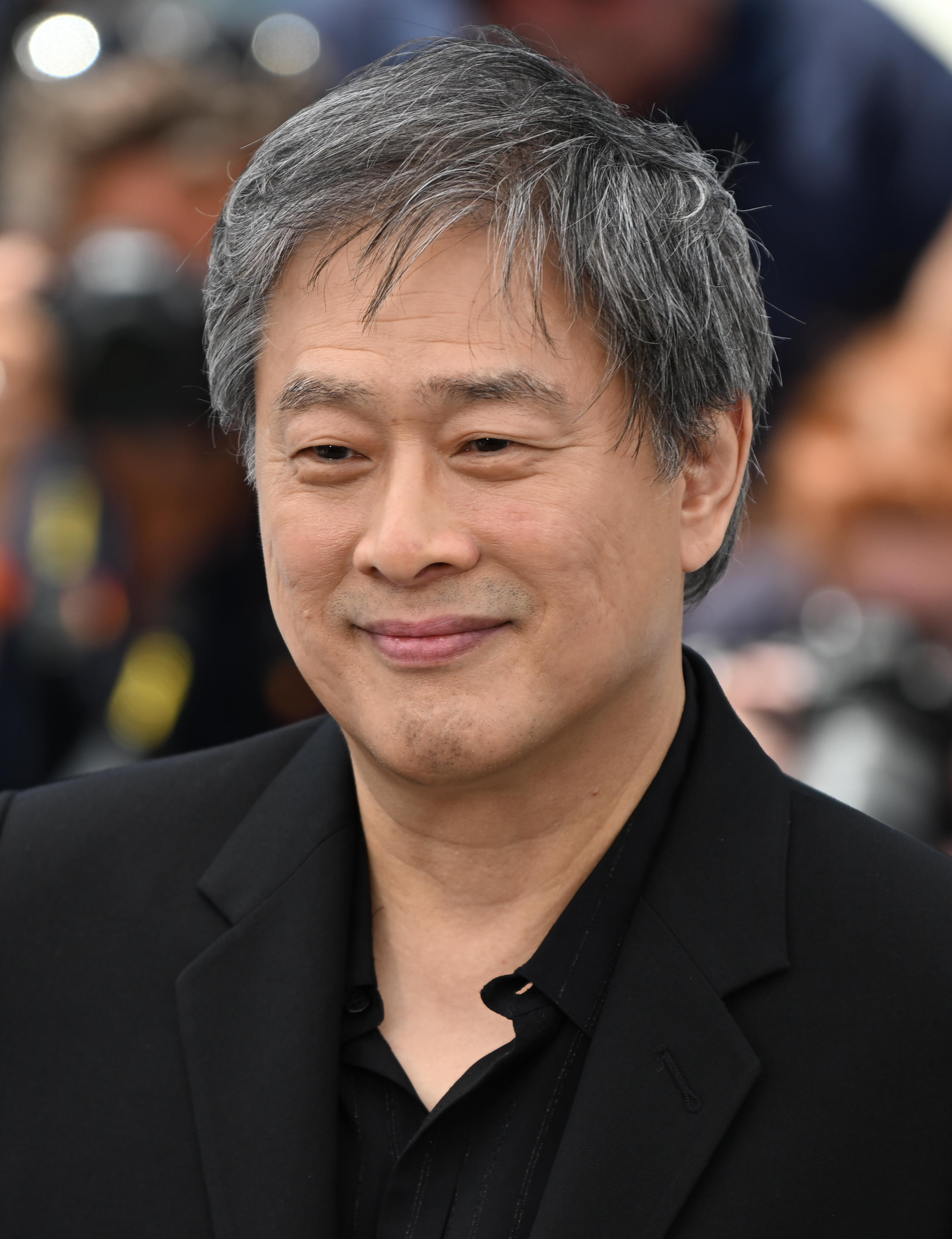
- Park at the 2026 Cannes Film Festival
- Born: August 23, 1963 (age 63); Seoul, South Korea
- Other name: Bakridamae (박리다매)
- Education: Sogang University, Seoul, South Korea
- Occupations: Film director; producer; screenwriter
- Years active: 1988–present
- Works: Filmography; bibliography
- Spouse: Kim Eun-hee (m. 1990)
- Children: 1
- Relatives: Park Chan-kyong (brother)
- Awards: Full list
- Honours: Bogwan Order of Cultural Merit (2002); Eun-gwan Order of Cultural Merit (2022); Commandeur de l'Ordre des Arts et des Lettres (2026)

Korean name
- Hangul: 박찬욱
- Hanja: 朴贊郁
- RR: Bak Chanuk
- MR: Pak Ch'anuk

Park Chan-wook (Korean: 박찬욱; pronounced [pak̚ tɕʰanuk̚]; born August 23, 1963) is a South Korean filmmaker and former film critic. Widely regarded as a leading figure in South Korean and 21st-century world cinema, (Note: Multiple references:) he is known for films that blend crime, mystery, and thriller elements with other genres. His films are noted for their cinematography, framing, black humor, and often brutal subject matter. (Note: Multiple references:)

After two unsuccessful films in the 1990s which he has since largely disowned, Park came to prominence with his acclaimed third directorial effort, Joint Security Area (2000), which became the highest-grossing film in South Korean history at the time and which Park himself prefers to be regarded as his directorial debut. Using his newfound creative freedom, he would go on to direct the films forming his unofficial The Vengeance Trilogy: Sympathy for Mr. Vengeance (2002), a financial failure that polarized critics, followed by Oldboy (2003) and Lady Vengeance (2005), both of which received critical acclaim and were financially successful. Oldboy in particular is regarded as one of the greatest films ever made, and helped establish Park as a well-known director outside his native country. (Note: Multiple references:)

Most of Park's work following The Vengeance Trilogy was also commercially and critically successful both in South Korea and internationally, such as Thirst (2009), The Handmaiden (2016), which earned Park the BAFTA Award for Best Film Not in the English Language, and Decision to Leave (2022), which won the Best Director award at the 2022 Cannes Film Festival. He directed the English-language miniseries The Little Drummer Girl (2018) and The Sympathizer (2024). His 2025 film No Other Choice was nominated for the Golden Globe for Best Foreign Language Film and shortlisted for the Academy Award for Best International Feature Film.

== Early life and education ==
Park Chan-wook was born in Seoul on August 23, 1963. He comes from a prominent, multi-generational local family. His father, Park Don-seo, was an architecture professor and dean at Ajou University, and his mother is a poet. Although Park originally dreamed of becoming a painter, he later shifted his aspirations toward becoming an art critic, believing that while he shared his brother's aesthetic sensibility, he lacked the technical drawing skills that his brother possessed.

His passion for cinema developed in his youth, influenced by foreign films he watched on his family black-and-white TV, broadcast by American Forces Korea Network (AFKN). As these programs were intended for U.S. personnel, they were mostly aired without Korean subtitles, requiring him to interpret the films purely through their cinematic elements and narrative structure. Park also credits his early experiences watching the James Bond franchise in theaters as an influence.

Aiming to become an art critic, Park enrolled in the Department of Philosophy at Sogang University. However, the university did not have a formal arts program, so he joined the campus photography and film clubs. In the film club, screenings of foreign films from VHS tapes became a significant turning point in his life. After watching Alfred Hitchcock's Vertigo (1958), Park decided to pursue a career in filmmaking.

== Career ==
=== Beginning in 1990s ===
After graduating, he began a career in film criticism and wrote articles on the subject for various publications. In 1988, he gained experience as an assistant director on Yu Yeong-jin's film Kkamdong. It was followed by 1989 film Watercolor Painting in a Rainy Day, directed by Kwak Jae-yong (who later gained fame for My Sassy Girl). Park's feature film debut, The Moon Is... the Sun's Dream was released in 1992. Five years later, he directed his second film, Trio, but neither film performed well at the box office. Because his first two films were commercial failures, Park had to support himself by working as a film critic across television and radio platforms.

=== Breakthrough ===
In 1999, Park was given the opportunity to create a short film titled Judgement, inspired by the Sampoong Department Store collapse. He collaborated with stage actors and held his first script reading, realizing that actors are not just "puppets." He appreciated the creative dialogue with them, acknowledging it as a luxury that novelists do not have.

This collaborative spirit continued with his third feature film, Joint Security Area, which tells the story of four soldiers from both North and South Korea who develop an unexpected friendship, leading to tragic consequences. During filming, Park and the actors formed strong bonds, often working late into the night and socializing afterward. Released in 2000, Joint Security Area became a major commercial and critical success, surpassing Kang Je-gyu's Shiri as the most-watched film in South Korea at the time. In 2009, Quentin Tarantino praised it of "the top twenty films made since 1992." In a 2017 interview, Park reflected on this, stating, "Many people think my directorial debut film is JSA, but I want to keep it that way".

=== Moho Film and Vengeance Trilogy ===
The success of Joint Security Area granted Park the independence to pursue more personal projects, leading him to establish his own production company, Moho Film, in 2002. Leveraging this newfound creative freedom, he directed a series of films that would become his unofficial "Vengeance Trilogy": Sympathy for Mr. Vengeance (2002), Oldboy (2003), and Lady Vengeance (2005). Though not originally intended as a set, the films are linked by their exploration of the futility of revenge and the havoc it wreaks on those involved.

The trilogy began with Sympathy for Mr. Vengeance (2002), a financial failure that polarized critics. However, the second film of the trilogy, Oldboy (2003), was a breakout success. American director Quentin Tarantino, an avowed fan of Park's work, served as the jury president at the 2004 Cannes Film Festival. Tarantino personally lobbied for Oldboy to be awarded the Palme d'Or, though the honor eventually went to Michael Moore's Fahrenheit 9/11. Oldboy instead garnered the Grand Prix, the festival's second-highest honor. Completing the trilogy, Lady Vengeance was later distributed by Tartan Films for its United States theatrical release in April 2006.

In 2006, Park was a member of the official jury section at the 63rd Venice International Film Festival. In February 2007, Park won the Alfred Bauer Prize at the 57th Berlin International Film Festival. The award, named after the festival's founder and in praise of works that introduce new perspectives, went to Park for his film, I'm a Cyborg, But That's OK.

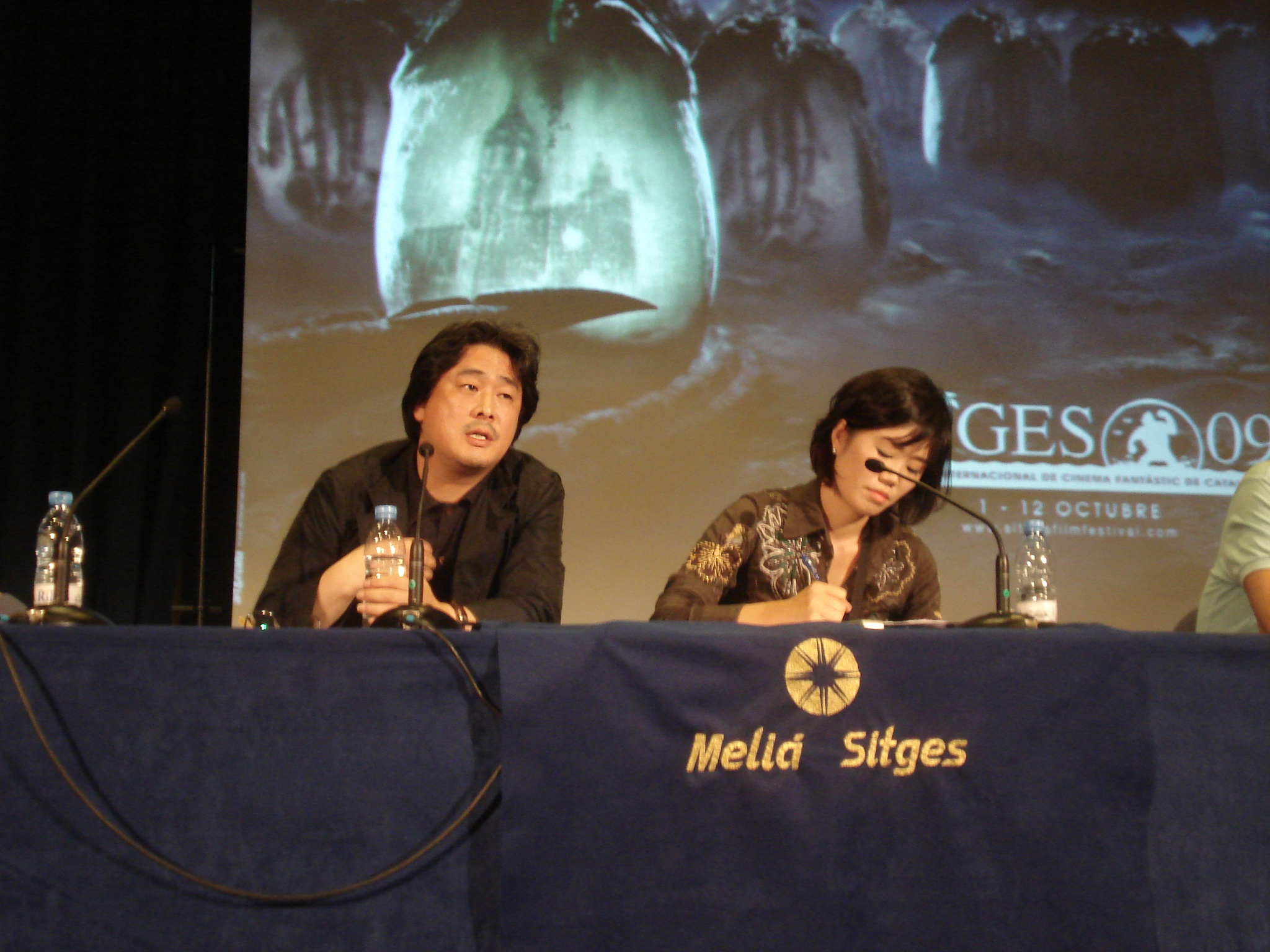
Park at the Festival Internacional de Cinema de Catalunya 2009

In 2009, Park directed the vampire film Thirst, starring Song Kang-ho, which won the Prix du Jury (alongside Fish Tank, directed by Andrea Arnold) at the 2009 Cannes Film Festival. He considered directing Tinker Tailor Soldier Spy but ultimately turned it down.

In 2011, brothers Park Chan-wook and Park Chan-kyong collaborated under the creative brand PARKing CHANce to co-write, direct, and produce the fantasy-horror short film Paranmanjang (also known as Night Fishing). Featuring singer-actress Lee Jung-hyun, the film was entirely shot using iPhone 4.. This project emerged from a strategic partnership with KT, South Korea's exclusive iPhone distributor, which provided 150 million won (approximately $133,447) in funding. The film was presented to over 100 reporters on January 11, 2011, before its public release on January 27. It garnered a nomination for Berlinale Shorts at the 61st Berlin International Film Festival and won the Golden Bear for Best Short Film.

PARKing CHANce's second short film, Day Trip (2012), was released in late December 2012. In this film, Song portrayed a long-haired, immortal master while incorporating pansori, a traditional Korean musical genre, which created considerable anticipation. The film received praise for elevating the artistic quality of a short film initially intended for commercial advertisement.

In 2013, Park directed his first film in English-language, Stoker. He said he learned to accelerate the production process and completed filming in 480 hours. Although Park does speak English, he used an interpreter on set. On why the script attracted his attention, Park said: "It wasn't a script that tried to explain everything and left many things as questions, so it leads the audience to find answers for themselves, and that's what I liked about the script... I like telling big stories through small, artificially created worlds". On March 2, 2013, Park appeared on a panel discussion about the film Stoker held at the Freer Gallery of Art in the Smithsonian's Museums of Asian Art.

Following this, PARKing CHANce released a music video in late July 2013. Starring Lee Jung-hyun, a well-known singer-actress and a pioneer of Hallyu in China, the music video was described as cinematic and disrupted conventional music video norms. It was lauded for its artistic merit and commercial appeal, racking up hundreds of thousands of views on YouTube.

=== International acclaim with The Handmaiden ===
In 2014, Park directed a short film A Rose Reborn, commissioned by luxury brand Ermenegildo Zegna, co-written by himself, Ayako Fujitani, Chung Chung-hoon and Michael Werwie, scored by Clint Mansell, and starring Jack Huston and Daniel Wu. It screened at the Rome International Film Festival and the Busan International Film Festival. In October 2014, it was announced that Park had signed on to direct the sci-fi body-swap film, Second Born.

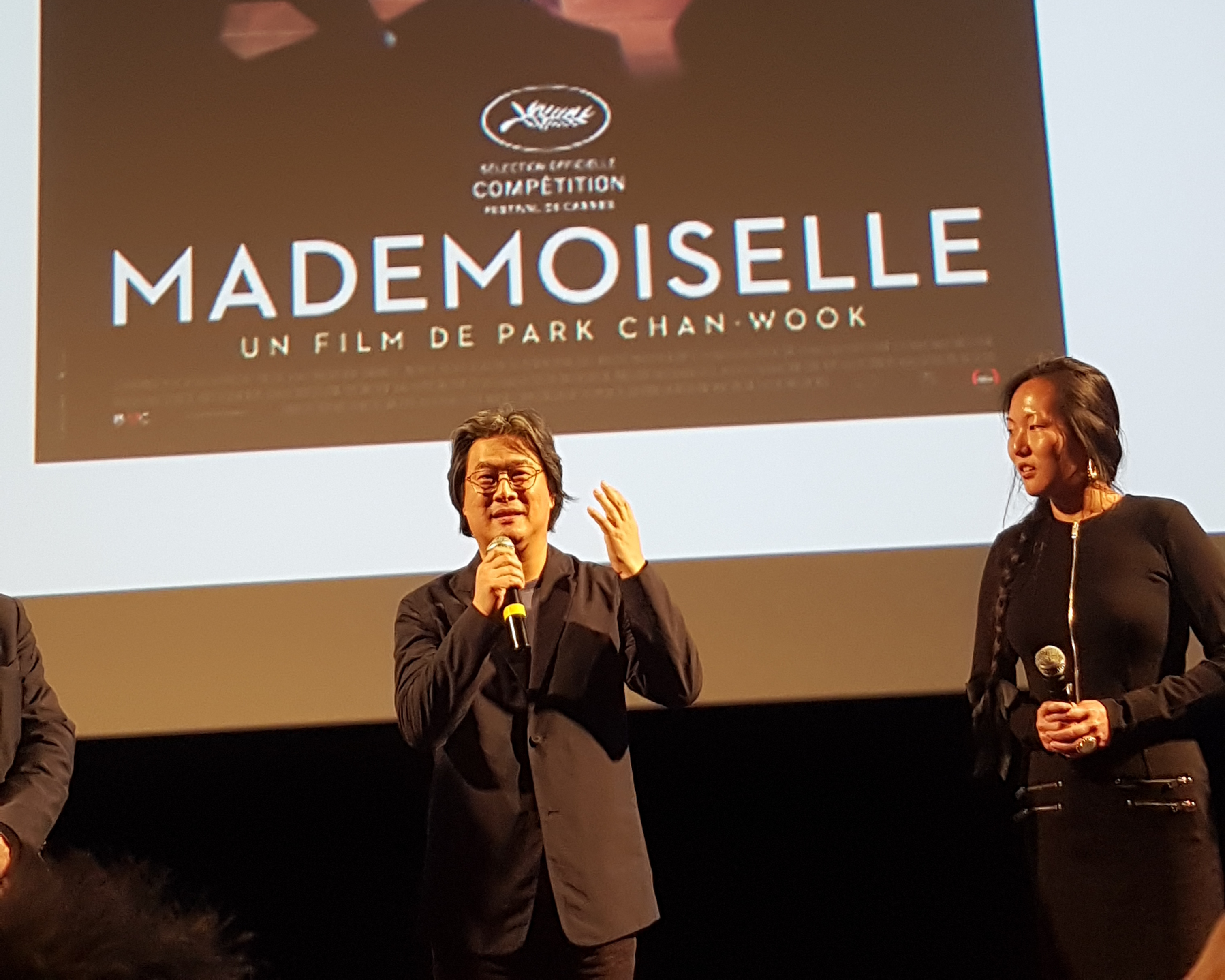
Park presenting The Handmaiden at the 2016 Lumière Film Festival

In September 2014, it was announced that Park would adapt Fingersmith, a historical crime novel by Sarah Waters. The film entered production in mid-2015 and ended on October 31, 2015. That film ended up becoming The Handmaiden and premiered in competition to rave reviews at the 2016 Cannes Film Festival, where Artistic Director Ryu Seong-hie won the Vulcain Prize for the Technical Arts, and the film was nominated for both the Palme d' Or and Queer Palm. The film saw box office success in several countries, including South Korea, the United States and the United Kingdom.

In January 2018, it was stated that Park would direct a TV miniseries adaptation of The Little Drummer Girl, a novel by John le Carré. It aired on BBC One in October of that year and stars Michael Shannon, Florence Pugh and Alexander Skarsgård.

At the 24th Busan International Film Festival, Park said that he is writing scripts for feature films, for theater and for TV, including a new installment in the Vengeance Trilogy, and an adaptation of Donald E. Westlake's novel The Ax. Park had first discussed adapting the book in 2009, when he received approval from Costa-Gavras who owned the rights and directed a previous rendition of the novel.

=== Further acclaim ===
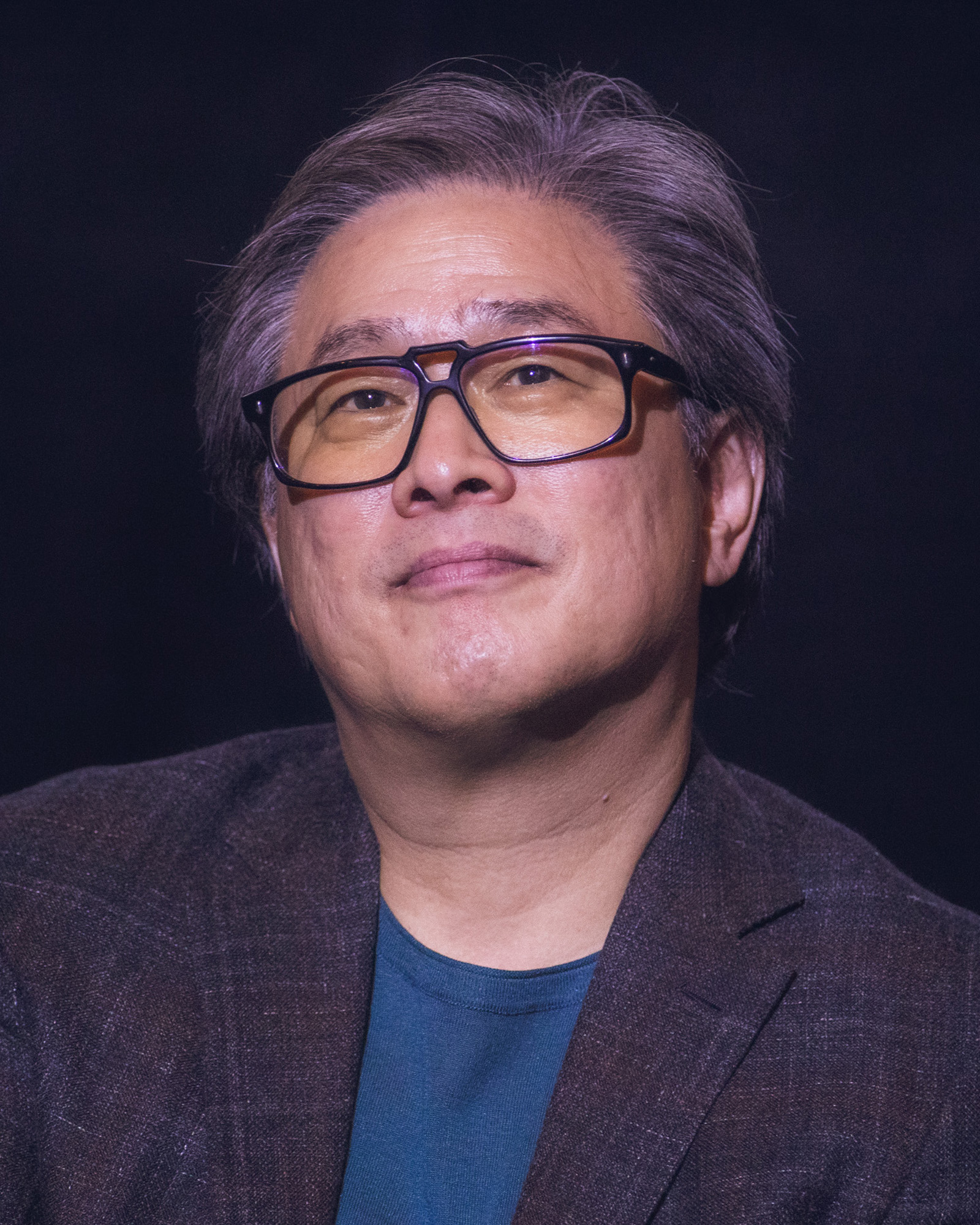
Park in 2025

In May 2020, it was announced that he was working on his next film, tentatively titled Heeojil gyeolsim (The Decision to Break Up). It is described as a melodrama and stars Tang Wei and Park Hae-il. In October 2020, the title of the film was revealed as Decision to Leave, with the story described as a murder mystery romance. The film was set to begin shooting later that month. In April 2021, A24 optioned Viet Thanh Nguyen's 2015 novel The Sympathizer for a TV adaptation, with Park directing. He was awarded Best Director at the 2022 Cannes Film Festival for his work on Decision to Leave.

In August 2024, Park began filming his adaptation of The Ax, titled No Other Choice. Park wrote the screenplay with previous collaborators Lee Kyoung-mi, Don McKellar and Lee Ja-hye. The film would also see Park reunite with actors Lee Byung-hun and Cha Seung-won.

In 2025, Park and his co-writer Don McKellar were expelled from the Writers Guild of America for working on The Sympathizer during the 2023 strike. Both he and McKellar are on the financial core list due to the expulsion.

In February 2026, Park was named jury president for the 2026 Cannes Film Festival, marking the first time a South Korean had been appointed to head the panel.

== Filmmaking ==
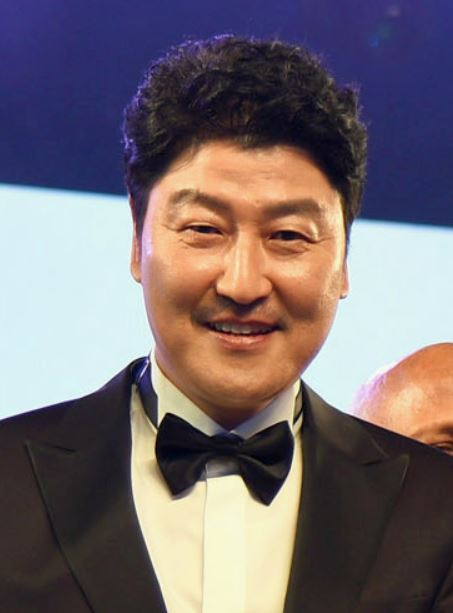
Song Kang-ho

In a May 2004 interview with The Hollywood Reporter, Park cited Sophocles, Shakespeare, Kafka, Dostoevsky, Balzac and Kurt Vonnegut as primary career influences. Additionally, he has identified Martin Scorsese's Taxi Driver as a "monument of film history" and one of his favorite films. His selection of 61 favorite films for LaCinetek features multiple works by Luchino Visconti, Abel Ferrara, Michelangelo Antonioni, Mikio Naruse and Alfred Hitchcock.

Park Chan-wook's filmography is characterized by a focus on precise cinematography, framing, black humor, and violent subject matter. Beyond traditional feature films, Park explores alternative formats through PARKing CHANce, a collaborative production brand he founded with his younger brother, media artist Park Chan-kyong. The name is a play on the brothers' shared surname and the syllable in their given names, while also functioning as a tongue-in-cheek English translation reflecting their desire to secure challenging creative opportunities. Operating through this brand, the duo has directed several short films, including Night Fishing (2011), Odalslow (2011), Day Trip (2012), V (2013), Decades Apart (2017), and Believe It or Not (2018).

In writers room, Park collaborated with screenwriter Jeong Seo-kyeong on several projects, such as Lady Vengeance, I'm a Cyborg, But That's OK, Thirst, The Handmaiden, and Decision to Leave. Lee Kyoung-mi served as assistant director on Lady Vengeance. Park subsequently produced, co-wrote, and cameoed in Lee's directorial debut Crush and Blush (2008), co-wrote Lee's The Truth Beneath (2016), and directed No Other Choice (2025) from a screenplay co-written by Lee.

Park sustains his creative output by maintaining tight-knit technical partnerships. He worked with Cinematographer Chung Chung-hoon for almost all of his films. Chung is known for his exceptional use of lighting and camera work, and his visual style has been a strong match for Park's directorial tone. Chung joined forces with Park on Oldboy. His editing suite is anchored by Kim Sang-bum, who has edited nearly all of Park's features since Joint Security Area (2000). Park's debut film, The Moon Is... the Sun's Dream was edited by Kim's father, Kim Hee-soo, and Park first met the family as a college student. For his work on Decision to Leave, Kim Sang-bum won the José Salcedo Award for Best Editing at the Valladolid International Film Festival.

Park has also collaborated with music director Jo Yeong-wook since Joint Security Area. The two have since worked on several projects together, including Oldboy, Lady Vengeance, The Handmaiden, and Decision to Leave.

Art director Ryu Seong-hie, make-up artist Song Jong-hee, and costume designer Jo Sang-gyeong have each shaped the distinct visual identity of Park's filmography across multiple decades and releases. Park first met Song since Joint Security Area. Park recruited Ryu for Oldboy while she was working on Memories of Murder, and Jo also worked with Park for the first time on Oldboy.

Park's casting choices also involved a recurring ensemble of prominent South Korean actors. Song Kang-ho has appeared in six of Park's feature length films. Other repeat performers include Shin Ha-kyun, who has appeared in four films, Park Hae-il, who has appeared in three films, and Lee Byung-hun, who has appeared in one short film and two feature films. These partnerships, along with the contributions of other lead actors like Choi Min-sik, Ha Jung-woo, as well as actresses Lee Young-ae, Moon So-ri, Son Ye-jin, and Kim Min-hee, have been central to the critical and commercial reception of Park's work within the global film industry.

== Personal life ==
=== Family and upbringing ===
Park was raised in a devout Catholic household in Seoul, a city his family has called home for five generations. While his upbringing was rooted in faith, he now identifies as an agnostic. He grew up in an environment focused on intellectual and cultural pursuits; his father, Park Don-seo, was a professor of architecture and dean at Ajou University, and his grandfather, Park Seung-seo, served as president of the Korean Bar Association. His younger brother, Park Chan-kyong, is a multimedia artist.

Park met his wife, Kim Eun-hee, through a mutual friend while she was studying at Ewha Womans University. He has since disclosed that when proposing, he misled his in-laws regarding his career by claiming to be a university professor. Park has frequently cited his wife's support as a cornerstone of his career, including during a 2015 tribute at the 15th Marrakech International Film Festival. Their daughter, Park Seo-woo, has followed the family's artistic path, studying at the Korea National University of Arts and later joining the art department for Park's film The Handmaiden. The couple resides in Heyri Art Valley in a residence designed by architect Kim Young-joon. The house utilizes a modern-traditional aesthetic and is configured with separate living quarters to accommodate both Park's immediate family and his parents.

=== Political views ===
In 2003, he shaved his head to protest the deaths of two South Korean schoolgirls in the Yangju highway incident. Ahead of the 2004 general election, he joined 226 other filmmakers in publicly declaring his support for the Democratic Labor Party and was also a member of its successor, the New Progressive Party. He supported Justice Party candidate Sim Sang-jung in the 2017 South Korean presidential election.

In 2014, he joined 100 other South Korean signatories in condemning military action in Gaza and calling on Seoul to halt arms sales to Israel.

== Filmography ==
- The Moon Is... the Sun's Dream (1992)
- Trio (1997)
- Joint Security Area (2000)
- Sympathy for Mr. Vengeance (2002)
- Oldboy (2003)
- Lady Vengeance (2005)
- I'm a Cyborg, But That's OK (2006)
- Thirst (2009)
- Stoker (2013)
- The Handmaiden (2016)
- Decision to Leave (2022)
- No Other Choice (2025)

== Bibliography ==
Books written by Park
Year	Title		Pages	Publisher	ISBN	Ref.
Year	English	Korean	Pages	Publisher	ISBN	Ref.
1994	The Secret Charm of Watching Movies	영화보기의 은밀한 매력	—	—	—	
2005	The Movie of My Life	내 인생의 영화	255	Cine21	ISBN 89-95659-90-4	
2005	Park Chan-wook's Montage	박찬욱의 몽타주	299	Mind walk	ISBN 89-89351-81-2	
2005	Park Chan-wook's Homage	박찬욱의 오마주	528	Mind walk	ISBN 89-89351-82-0	
2017	There's No Secret to a Script	각본 비밀은 없다	196	Your Mind	ISBN 9791186946138	

== See also ==
- List of Korean-language films
- Cinema of South Korea
- Contemporary culture of South Korea
