= Taiwania Capital =

Taiwanese venture capital firm

- Industry: Venture capital
- Founded: 2017; 9 years ago
- Headquarters: Taipei, Taiwan
- Key people: Lin Hsin-yi (chairman)
- AUM: US$1 billion (2024)
- Website: taiwaniacapital.com

Taiwania Capital Management Corporation (Chinese: 台杉投資; traded as Taiwania Capital or simply Taiwania) is a Taiwanese venture capital firm headquartered in Taipei. Founded in 2017, the firm primarily invests in early stage companies.

== History ==
Taiwania Capital was sponsored by the National Development Fund (40% ownership) and founded in August 2017. As of August 2021, it had raised about US$490 million (NT$13.75 billion) for five funds, with focuses in internet of things and biotechnology investments. In the firm's first four years, it made 34 investments, of which five had gone public.

In 2022, Taiwania launched a $200 million fund to invest in Central and Eastern European companies. The fund focuses on companies in Lithuania, the Czech Republic, and Slovakia.

Wu Rong-i served as chairman from 2017 to 2024 and was succeeded by Lin Hsin-i. Under Wu's leadership, the firm invested in over 75 companies.

== Investments ==
Notable investments that have had IPOs include:

- Ambiq Micro
- C4 Therapeutics
- Fractyl Health
