= Judgement (1999 film) =

1999 Korean short film

- Film poster
- Hangul: 심판
- Hanja: 審判
- RR: Simpan
- MR: Simp'an
- Directed by: Park Chan-wook
- Written by: Park Chan-wook
- Produced by: Park Chan-wook
- Starring: Gi Ju-bong; Koh In-bae; Kwon Nam-hee; Park Ji-il; Choi Hak-rak; Myeong Ji-yeon
- Cinematography: Park Hyun-Cheol
- Edited by: Kim Sang-bum
- Release date: 1999
- Running time: 26 minutes
- Country: South Korea
- Language: Korean

Judgement (Korean: 심판) is a 1999 short film by South Korean director Park Chan-wook based on the 1995 Sampoong Department Store collapse.

== Synopsis ==
In a morgue lies the lifeless body of a girl, waiting to be identified. The girl was killed in the collapse of the Sampoong Department store and a wrongful death settlement has been offered to her family. The girl's body is claimed both by a middle-aged couple, who say she is their runaway daughter, and by one of the morgue employees, whose daughter disappeared seven years ago. The story is interspersed with documentary footage from various disasters.

== Cast ==
- Gi Ju-bong as Funeral director
- Koh In-bae as Husband
- Kwon Nam-hee as Wife
- Park Ji-il as Public servant
- Choi Hak-rak as TV correspondent
- Myeong Ji-yeon as Daughter
- Lee Jong-yong as Cameraman
- Kim Tae-ryong as Girl in the photo

== Reception ==
Another Mag praised the camera work and use of color in a mostly black-and-white film, noting how it foreshadows the stylistic hallmarks Park developed in later projects. The blog Film School Rejects described it as "a miniature triumph of genre blending", comparing it to both film noir and Korean soap opera.
