= The Moon Is... the Sun's Dream =

1992 South Korean film

- Hangul: 달은... 해가 꾸는 꿈
- RR: Dareun... haega kkuneun kkum
- MR: Tarŭn... haega kkunŭn kkum
- Directed by: Park Chan-wook
- Written by: Kim Yong-tae; Park Chan-wook
- Produced by: Go Sun-jong; Im Jin-gyu
- Starring: Lee Seung-chul; Na Hyun-hee
- Cinematography: Park Seung-bae
- Edited by: Kim Hee-su
- Music by: Sin Jae-hong
- Release date: February 29, 1992
- Running time: 103 minutes
- Country: South Korea
- Language: Korean

The Moon Is... the Sun's Dream (Korean: 달은... 해가 꾸는 꿈) is a 1992 South Korean film directed by Park Chan-wook in his feature directorial debut.

A crime drama involving a love triangle between a singer, a gangster, and the gangster's photographer brother, it features pop star Lee Seung-chul in his acting debut.

== Plot ==
Mu-hoon, a Busan gangster, falls in love with Eun-ju, the mistress of his boss Mr Oh. Together they steal a large sum of Mr Oh's money and elope to a seaside village, where Mu-hoon proposes to Eun-ju. However, Mr Oh's men soon catch up with them. Mu-hoon escapes out of a window with the money, but Eun-ju is slashed across the face with a knife and taken away.

One year later, Mu-hoon visits his half-brother Ha-young, a successful photographer in Seoul. He recognizes Eun-ju in one of his brother's photos, singing on stage at a nightclub. They head to the club, but they spot Man-cheol, one of Mr Oh's Busan gangsters, watching the door. Ha-young goes inside alone to find Eun-ju, and she warns him that her life was spared only so she could act as bait to entrap Mu-hoon.

Ha-young suggests that the two lovers meet in the dark of a local cinema, but Eun-ju is kept as a prisoner in her apartment by Man-cheol. Mu-hoon breaks into the apartment and frees Eun-ju; Man-cheol wearily accepts without a fight, admitting that he also betrayed Mr Oh's trust and his punishment was being given the job of Eun-ju's warden. Mu-hoon tells Man-cheol to report to Mr Oh that he's willing to return the money and make amends. However, when he meets with his old boss he's told that to save his and Eun-ju's lives he must assassinate the key witness in a police investigation into Mr Oh's meth business. Mu-hoon asks for time to consider the offer, but secretly retrieves the money from its hiding place at his mother's house, intending to run away again with Eun-ju.

Meanwhile, Mr Oh's men keep searching for Eun-ju, who hides out at Ha-young's apartment and studio. After stepping in for an ad campaign she decides to become a professional model, and has plastic surgery to hide her facial scar. She and Ha-young bond over their mutual interests in fashion, music, and film, and a modelling agency offers her a contract to appear in a major televised catwalk runway show on Christmas Eve. Ha-young realizes he is falling in love with Eun-ju, but suppresses his feelings for the sake of his brother.

Mu-hoon realizes too late—on the day that her ad campaign launches—that Eun-ju will blow their cover. Mr Oh's men break into Ha-young's apartment and beat him up; when Mu-hoon rushes to the hospital, another gangster is waiting for him. Realizing that he can no longer elope again with Eun-ju without Ha-young being hurt as collateral, he calls Mr Oh and accepts the assassination job. He is told that the target is none other than Man-cheol, who has secretly turned informer.

On the day of the hit, Mu-hoon waits in the court parking garage. Man-cheol, assuming that Mu-hoon was sent to free him, helps him knock out the two cops escorting him. Mu-hoon then pulls out a knife and reluctantly prepares to kill Man-cheol. However, an officer recovers and pulls out his gun; Man-cheol grabs it, but Mu-hoon is shot in the stomach. He stumbles out of the building and gets into Mr Oh's waiting car, kills him, and is thrown out along with Mr Oh's body by the panicking driver. He makes it to a phone booth and calls Ha-young for help, who leaves the fashion show without telling Eun-ju; however, she sees news of the failed assassination attempt on TV and runs out during her debut runway walk. Ha-young drives Mu-hoon to a nearby animal hospital, and Eun-ju arrives in time to see him die. She confesses to his body that she was the one who went to the police about Man-cheol, leading to the arrest that made him become an informant; she blames herself for the entire chain of events.

A year later, Ha-young has quit photography, while Eun-ju has become a major celebrity. Ha-young has rejected her repeated attempts to stay in contact because, unlike his brother, he "only ever needed her image." He visits an empty cinema to watch her in a movie, then approaches the screen to reach out towards the projection of her face. The film stops, the house lights turn on, and Ha-young turns to face the camera, distraught.

== Cast ==
- Lee Seung-chul as Mu-hoon
- Na Hyeon-hui as Eun-ju
- Song Seung-hwan as Ha-young
- Bang Eun-hee as Su-mi
- Lee Ki-yeol as Du-mok
- Kim Dong-soo as Man-cheol
- Kim Ye-ryeong also made one of her first appearances on-screen, playing a coordinator.

== Release ==
The movie was a critical and commercial failure, and Park has "essentially disowned" both it and his second feature, Trio—including resisting attempts to make it available to watch on home media.

In a 2006 interview, he said: "It's really fortunate that not many of you have seen this first film - for you and for me! I made it when I was in my twenties and I had this blind ambition to basically make a film, so that's how I got to make that film. And it was very low budget, and very sentimental, and it's just very... you know... awful."
