= Park Chan-kyong =

South Korean artist (born 1965)

- Born: 1965 (age 60–61); Seoul, South Korea
- Education: Seoul National University; California Institute of the Arts
- Known for: Media art, Film, Arts criticism

Korean name
- Hangul: 박찬경
- RR: Bak Changyeong
- MR: Pak Ch'an'gyŏng

Park Chan-kyong (Korean: 박찬경; b. 1965 in Seoul, South Korea) is a South Korean media artist, filmmaker, and arts critic. Park is known for his advocacy of the revival of minjung art in the 90s through both exhibition organizing and writing. With his first solo show in 1997, Park's career as a media artists working across photography, film, sculpture, and installation art took off, even as he continued to write criticism and curate shows. His multimedia works often deal with traumatic moments in Korean modern and contemporary history (e.g. the splitting of the Korean peninsula), the relevance of tradition in the modern age, and the shifting role of spiritual practices like shamanism in contemporary Korea.

After graduating from Seoul National University in 1988, Park was part of several collectives engaged with the legacy of minjung art, including the Art Criticism Research Group, Seongnam Project, and Art Space Pool. He curated exhibitions and collaborated on projects that concerned Korea's rapidly changing urban space, as well as wrote extensively for publications like Forum A (which he cofounded) on theoretical issues about contemporary Korean art. Park's artistic practice from the late 1990s continued to engage with core questions minjung artists had raised decades prior about the relationship between politics and art. He continued to explore the possibilities of utilizing documentary photography and archival material to examine the effects of Korea's rapid modernization with works like Sindoan (2008) and Manshin: Ten Thousand Spirits (2014). Through his curation of Mediacity Seoul 2014, Park attempted to expand his thinking to consider how artists across Asia utilize similar techniques and imagery to engage with trauma, leading him to continue drawing on the phrase "Asian Gothic" (a term he coined in 2007) in his writing.

Park has exhibited extensively at home and abroad—sometimes together with his brother filmmaker Park Chan-wook under the moniker PARKing CHANce. Together they won the Golden Bear at the Berlin International Film Festival in 2011 for their film Night Fishing (2011). Both brothers were temporarily blacklisted by the South Korean Culture Ministry under president Park Geun-hye's administration. The end of the blacklist has allowed Park Chan-kyong to resume his major film projects. Park will also have his first solo show in the US at the National Museum of Asian Art at the Smithsonian at the end of 2023. Park still lives and works in Seoul.

== Early life ==
Park was born and raised in Seoul with older brother Park Chan-wook. They were brought up as Catholic.

== Education ==
Park received a BFA in Western Painting from the College of Fine Arts at Seoul National University in 1988, and an MFA from the Photography and Media program at the California Institute of the Arts (Valencia, California) in 1995. While at Cal Arts, Park studied with artist Allan Sekula and filmmaker Thom Anderson.

== Work ==
=== Minjung art ===
Park was closely involved with the efforts in the 90s and early 2000s to revive Minjung art as an artist and critic, leading art historian Shin Chunghoon to declare Park as part of the wave of "post-Minjung art". Park wrote theoretical texts on the relationship between minjung art and modernism, founded publications like Forum A, and joined collectives like Art Criticism Research Group all in an effort to revitalize Minjung art.

Akin to earlier minjung artists and critics, Park has criticized Dansaekhwa and accused it of self-Orientalism.

==== Art Criticism Research Group (1989-1993) ====
Park was a member of the Art Criticism Research Group (미술비평연구회, Misulbipyeongyeongguhoe), a collective of critics whom Park described as the fourth generation of the Minjung art movement. Park called for the redeployment of montage and kitsch in an effort to reformulate the techniques and goals of Minjung art during the period of its decline. In addition to writing arts criticism, Park and the other critics organized a series of exhibitions in 1992 focused on Seoul's urban visual culture. Along with Beck Jee-sook, Park curated the show "City Mass Culture (dosi daejung munhwa)" in 1992. For the exhibition, Park presented an installation titled Life and Death of the Images (1992) composed of newspaper images of self-immolating protesters juxtaposed with souvenir photos of factory workers.

==== Forum A (1997-2005) ====
Park cofounded the monthly magazine Forum A in October 1997 with Jeon Yong-suk and a group of artists, curators and critics, whose numbers grew to over sixty over time. The publication printed art criticism and translations of texts on art abroad in an effort to expand art discourse in the country.

==== Seongnam Project (1998-1999) ====
Park was part of the artist collective Seongnam Project (성남프로젝트, Seongnampeurojekteu), whose members included Kim Tae-heon, Kim Hong-bin, Mah In-hwang, Park Yong-seok, Park Hye-yeon, Son Hye-min, Yoo Ju-ho, Cho Ji-eun, and Im Heung-soon. The group focused on the relationship between art and public space in Seongnam, South Korea's first planned city, producing a range of works including documentary photography, a brochure, video, and installation art.

The collective came together when curator Lee Young-chul (who had also been a member of the Art Criticism Research Group) invited Park to participate in his upcoming show "98 City and Media: Clothing, Food House," at the Seoul City Museum of Art. Park proposed to make a collective work, and along with artist Kim Tae-heon, invited the other members, who were graduates from universities in Seongnam and Anywang where Park lectured. The group presented an installation at museum at Seoul, and presented a nearly identical version of the work at the Seongnam City Hall so Seongnam residents could see the installation as well.

==== Art Space Pool (1999-2021) ====
Park was one of the founding members of Art Space Pool (대안공간 풀, Daeangonggan pul). The collective of artists and critics, including those from Forum A, ran the alternative exhibition space in Seoul until April 2021.

=== Key artworks ===
==== Black Box: Memory of Cold War Images (1997) ====
For Park's first solo exhibition at the Kumho Museum of Art, the artist focused on representations of the Cold War in Korea. The installation included a slide projector showing a series of mass media images along with his own memories of the Cold War.

==== Sets (2000) ====
Sets also featured a slide projection of 160 photographs. The photographs depict three different sets. One was a movie set of Seoul that is actually located in Pyongyang (these images were taken from South Korean journalist Im Jongjin's series from his sanctioned visit to Pyongyang in 2000). Another was a movie set replica of Panmunjom also functioning as a tourist site (Park took these photos). The last was a South Korean military's war simulation set. Park's presentation of "the cultural industry's impulse to fictionalize the 'other' Korea" alongside evidence of the ongoing reality of military and political tensions with the war simulation set explore the shifting national discourse and sentiment on the relationship between North and South Korea.

==== Koreans Who Went to Germany (2002-3) ====
During his residency at Akademie Schloss Solitude in winter 2002–3, Park presented a series of photographs and texts on miners and nurses who migrated to Germany from the 60s to the 80s. Park's writing for the series incorporated interviews from the Korean immigrants, explanations of working conditions, and the broader geopolitical context that brought the laborers there (e.g. the Korean government's history of exporting labor).

==== Sindoan (2008) ====
Park's video integrates archival footage, documentary photography, and first-hand accounts from members from a range of religious groups who were forced out of an area on Gyeryong Mountain by authorities who wanted to make the mountain part of a national park in 1984.

==== Night Fishing (2011) ====
Park worked with Park Chan-wook under the moniker PARKing CHANce to direct, produce, and write the short film shot using an Apple iPhone 4, and starring singer Lee Jung-hyun. The film centers on a shaman who is possessed by the spirit of a fisherman who uses the spiritual medium to speak to his family. The brothers won the Golden Bear at the Berlin International Film Festival in 2011 for the film.

==== Manshin: Ten Thousand Spirits (2014) ====
Park's film focuses on one of Korea's most famous shamans: Kim Keum-hwa. Park sought out Kim after reading her autobiography, wanting to present 20th century Korean history via the perspective of a mudang. To create the film, Park wove together documentation on her life and work with archival footage of performances and interviews, but chose not to order scenes in chronological order. In particular, Park sought to highlight how the clash between the Korean spiritual tradition and a modernizing Korea shaped Kim's life as she escaped a police raid when authorities began to crack down on shamanistic practices under President Park Chung Hee's regime, and groups of local Christians sought to interfere with her rituals.

==== Small Art History (2014-19) ====
Park created the installation for his solo show at the Institute of International Visual Arts in London, and then showed it again in 2017 for his exhibition at Kukje Gallery, and in 2019 at MMCA. The changing installation has consisted of reproductions of artworks ranging from the 14th/15th century Chinese painting Man Sleeping on a Bamboo Couch to Bahc Yiso's untitled concrete, rebar, and wire sculptures from 1994, images of shrines and temples, and photographs of artists like Lee Ungno. The wide array of images and objects are all accompanied by annotations written by Park.

==== Citizen's Forest (2016) ====
Park presented the black and white video at the Taipei Biennial in 2016, and then Art Basel Unlimited in 2017. Park used the panorama of the three-channel format video to evoke shanshui painting, and structured the video to emulate the experience of seeing a landscape painting on a long scroll. Park was inspired by Minjung artist Oh Yoon's painting The Lemures (1984), and Kim Soo-young's poem "Colossal Roots" when creating the narrative framework of the piece. The roughly 25-minute-long video references major traumatic events in Korean history, including the Dongak Peasant Revolution (1894–95), the Korean War (1950-53), the Gwangju Uprising (1980), and the sinking of the MV Sewol. The most recent event with the Sewol ferry was what initially motivated Park to make the work.

When asked whether or not the video illustrates a struggle between history and memory, Park responded: "The ghosts appearing in the video don't engage in any particular activities nor do they refer to any specific historical event. It is as if the ghosts are aware of the fact that people today, like us or the viewers, feel indifferent about themselves (ghosts). In such ways, their existence is removed from our memories, affirming once again their abandoned, forgotten presence."

=== Curation ===
==== Mediacity Seoul (2014) ====
Park was the artistic director of the eighth iteration of Mediacity Seoul, titled "Ghosts, Spies and Grandmothers."

Park included the work of directors like Apichatpong Weerasethakul, Joshua Oppenheimer, and Rithy Panh, whose short films and documentaries on Thailand, Indonesia, and Cambodia respectively expanded the scope of the large-scale exhibition beyond Seoul.

== Major themes ==
=== Historical memory ===
Park often references modern and contemporary Korean historical events in works like Citizen's Forest (2016).

Shin Chunghoon argues that with works like Black Box: The Memory of Cold War Images (1997) and Sets (2000), Park is less interested in interrogating the actual events of history, and more concerned with how images shape human memory of historical moments.

Scholar Park Sohyun describes Park's approach to the "politics of memory" as that of an "image archaeologist" collecting and sifting through a wide array of archival materials.

Curator Hyunjin Kim asserts that Park delves into traumatic historical moments in order to rethink Asian modernity, and pursue a "hauntological understanding of the extremely violent and oppressive trajectories of East Asia in the twentieth century."

=== Kitsch ===
Shin Chunghoon traces Park's use of kitsch back to techniques used by minjung art groups like Reality and Utterance.

Park acknowledged his use of kitsch elements in video works like Sindoan (2008). Park stated that he intentionally incorporated elements of kitsch in the work, seeking to critique urban dwellers who might initially dismiss these images as proof of their superiority over naive rural citizens.

=== Tradition ===
Issues of tradition began to feature more prominently in Park's work with Sindoan.

Park distinguishes tradition from traditional culture, making the former "challenging to accurately verbalize in and of itself." Park describes tradition as "fragmented structures of power that have been long-preserved with a society." His sustained interest in questions of tradition has resulted in writing by both the artist and scholars writing on his work, like curator and critic Patrick Flores, on the relationship of tradition to the sublime, colonial history, and the present-day. Park's insistence on the relevance of tradition to the contemporary moment led him to declare with fellow critic Lee Youngwook that "the task before us is, then, to reawaken the tradition that has been severed and oppressed from our memories, and feel it with all our senses, for this is how the future comes into view." This longer chronology for tradition has led him to adopt the term "longue durée tradition."

=== Religion ===
In his notes for the catalogue for his exhibition at the National Museum of Modern and Contemporary Art (MMCA) from 2019 to 2020, Park described a theological shift in his artistic practice that he had in the mid-2000s while working on Sindoan (2008). He explained that he tried to balance history and religion in the video work Sindoan, for which he felt that a Western framework for understanding Korean modernity was insufficient. After making Sindoan, Park made several feature films and short films on Korean folk religion and shamanism, including Anyang, Paradise City (2010), Manshin: Ten Thousand Spirits (2013), and Citizen's Forest (2016).

His interest in religion, and more specifically Buddhism, grew after the Fukushima nuclear accident and the sinking of the MV Sewol ferry. Park clarified however, that this turn to religious themes in his work is motivated by his interest in visual and literary culture around Buddhism rather than Buddhist doctrine itself. Belated Bosal (2019) is one example of this move in his work towards Buddhism.

Park's exploration of religion in his work is also in part prompted by his observations of the effects of secularization on Korean society, prompting his to ask how they might "restore a sense of community in a completely de-sacred society, regardless of how religious institutions claim and work now."

=== Asian Gothic ===
Park first used the term in 2007 in his essay on Sindoan, but only fully explained the concept in a paper he gave in 2014 at the Special Symposium of the Korean Society of Art History in 2014. Park described "Asian Gothic" as referring to "a return of grotesque gothic imagery in contemporary Korean culture" that reflects "local trauma (violence, fear, pain, of Asia's modern project)." He argued that gothic culture generally emerges in "postwar or postcolonial societies when tradition is reconfigured in the contemporary moment," and pointed to other examples in Southeast Asia, Japan, and China.

== Critical reception ==
Critic Kim Junghyun questioned Park's curation of Mediacity Seoul 2014: "Does one need to be come a shaman to reveal the history of the modern Other? Does the artist have to assume the role of a shaman to achieve this? Furthermore, why should artworks be carried out in the name of 'discovering tradition'? Why does the spiritual medium only insist on modern history rather than contemporary events?"

Critic Tiffany Yeon Chae expressed doubt about the potential for artworks like Park's to draw on Korean shamanism as a way to overcome Korea's traumatic colonial history and division, arguing that Korean society has changed greatly since minjung artists from the 80s had explored this idea.

In a review of Park's show at Kukje Gallery, critic Ye Eun Nam argued that while Park's work reveals a desire to leave behind tradition, his reference to traditional art and spiritual traditions suggests that he will never be able to achieve that goal in spite of his intentions.

Writing on Park's latest show at MMCA in 2019, Andy St. Louis finds Park's work to be "grounded in a rigorous conceptual framework (navigating notions of modernity, tradition, representation and historicization)," while also delivering "on an emotional level by moving beyond polemics of institutional critique and postcolonial discourse to contemplate how individuals in society cope in the aftermath of disaster."

== Blacklist ==
Park's name was among the list of 9,000 artists blacklisted for being critical of the former president Park Geun-hye. As a result, the Korean Film Council rejected Park's proposal for a horror film before Park's impeachment.

== Select exhibitions ==
=== Solo exhibitions ===
2023-24

- "Park Chan-kyong: Gathering," National Museum of Asian Art, Smithsonian, Washington DC

2019

- "MMCA Hyundai Motor Series 2019: Park Chan-kyong – Gathering," MMCA Seoul, Seoul

2018

- "Citizen’s Forest," Tina Kim Gallery, New York
- "PARKing CHANce 2010-2018," Asia Culture Center, Gwangju

2017

- "安寧 Farewell," Kukje Gallery, Seoul

2016

- "Park Chan-kyong," Tina Kim Gallery, New York

2015

- "Pa-Gyong: Last Sutra Recitation," Iniva, London

2010

- "Radiance," PKM Gallery | Bartleby Bickle & Meursault, Seoul

2008

- "Sindoan," Atelier Hermès, Seoul

2003

- "Koreans Who Went to Germany," Akademie Schloss Solitude, Stuttgart

2002

- "Sets," rraum02, Frankfurt

1997

- "Black Box: Memory of the Cold War Images," Kumho Museum, Seoul

=== Group exhibitions ===
2022

- "Checkpoint. Border Views from Korea," Kunstmuseum Wolfsburg, Wolfsburg
- "Off the Page," Daejeon Art Center, Daejeon

2020

- Yokohama Triennale 2020: "Afterglow," Yokohama Museum of Art, Yokohama

2019

- 2019 Asian Art Biennial: "The Strangers from beyond the Mountain and the Sea," National Taiwan Museum of Fine Arts, Taipei
- Aichi Triennale 2019: "Taming Y/Our Passion," Aichi Arts Center/Nagoya City Art Museum, Nagoya

2018

- 24th Busan International Film Festival, Busan
- "Rituals of Signs and Metamorphoses 仪礼·兆与易," Red Brick Art Museum, Beijing
- "Mise-en-Scène: A History of Images," National Museum of Modern and Contemporary Art, Seoul

2017

- "Ghosts and Spectres – Shadows of History," NTU CCA Singapore, Singapore

2013

- "Real DMZ Project: From the North," Artsonje Center, Seoul

== Awards ==
- Hermès Korea Misulsang (2004)
- Golden Bear Prize, Berlin International Film Festival (2011)
- Grand Prize for a Korean Feature Film, 12th Jeonju International Film Festival (2011)

== Collections ==
- National Museum of Modern and Contemporary Art, Seoul
- Seoul Museum of Art
- Gyeonggi Museum of Modern Art
- Art Sonje Center
