= Trio (1997 film) =

- Film poster
- Hangul: 3인조
- RR: 3injo
- MR: 3injo
- Directed by: Park Chan-wook
- Written by: Park Chan-wook
- Produced by: Lee Choon-yun
- Starring: Lee Geung-young; Kim Min-jong; Jeong Seon-kyeong
- Cinematography: Lee Eun-gil
- Edited by: Park Gok-ji
- Music by: Jeon Sang-yoon
- Distributed by: Cine-2000
- Release date: May 24, 1997 (South Korea)
- Running time: 102 minutes
- Country: South Korea
- Language: Korean

Trio (Korean: 3인조) is the second feature film by South Korean film director Park Chan-wook, released in 1997. Similarly to his debut film, The Moon Is... the Sun's Dream, it has been seen by relatively few people outside of Korea.

== Plot ==
Three outsiders are united by a common cause. A suicidal saxophonist named Ahn is pushed over the edge after he discovers his wife's infidelity, and decides to rob a bank, aided by a violent man (Moon), and a young woman (Maria), who is looking for her missing child.

== Cast ==
- Lee Geung-young as Ahn
- Jeong Seon-kyeong as Maria
- Kim Min-jong as Moon
- Kim Bu-seon as Ahn's wife
- Jang Yong as Captain Choi

== Production ==
Park was asked by film producer Dong-gyu Ahn to make a film similar in tone to Léon, a French film written and directed by Luc Besson. Park had never seen the film, but had previously wanted to make a film about a series of armed robberies committed from 1972 to 1974 in South Korea, and chose to use that as a basis. Park was also initially influenced by the works of Abel Ferrara.

However, as time passed, the production company for the film changed, and the film lost its wild and violent conception, becoming closer to a mainstream film. Park took blame for the film's perceived failure, saying, "I regret Trio much more than my first movie."
