= Night Fishing (film) =

- Film poster
- Hangul: 파란만장
- Hanja: 波瀾萬丈
- RR: Paranmanjang
- MR: P'aranmanjang
- Directed by: Park Chan-wook; Park Chan-kyong
- Written by: Park Chan-wook; Park Chan-kyong
- Produced by: Park Chan-wook; Park Chan-kyong
- Starring: Lee Jung-hyun; Oh Kwang-rok
- Cinematography: Ju Sung-lim
- Edited by: Ana Garcia
- Music by: Jang Young-kyoo
- Production company: Moho Films
- Distributed by: KT olleh
- Release date: January 27, 2011
- Running time: 33 minutes
- Country: South Korea
- Language: Korean

Night Fishing (Korean: 파란만장; lit. "Ups and Downs." or "A Checkered Past") is a 2011 South Korean fantasy-horror short film directed, produced, written by PARKing CHANce, brand name of the brothers, Park Chan-wook and Park Chan-kyong. The lead role is played by K-pop star Lee Jung-hyun.

It was shot entirely on iPhone 4, and it was financially supported by KT, South Korea's exclusive distributor of the iPhone at the time. KT supplied the duo with 150 million Korean Won (US$133,447). It was screened to over 100 reporters on January 11, 2011, and opened for public release on January 27.

The film won the Golden Bear for Best Short Film at the 61st Berlin International Film Festival.

== Plot ==
A man casually sets up for a fishing trip at the water's edge. Evening comes and a tug on his line presents him with the body of a woman. While he tries to disentangle himself from the fishing lines, she comes alive. The scene changes and the woman is now a shaman priestess in a funeral ritual for the same man who drowned in a river. He speaks through her to his relatives, asking for forgiveness.

== Cast ==
- Lee Jung-hyun as a female shaman
- Oh Kwang-rok as Oh Kee-seok, a fisherman
- Lee Yong-nyeo as mother of Kee-seok

== Production ==
The film was captured entirely using iPhone 4, with the additional extra lenses and otherwise regular filmmaking equipment.

== See also ==
- List of films shot on mobile phones
