= List of accolades received by The Banshees of Inisherin =

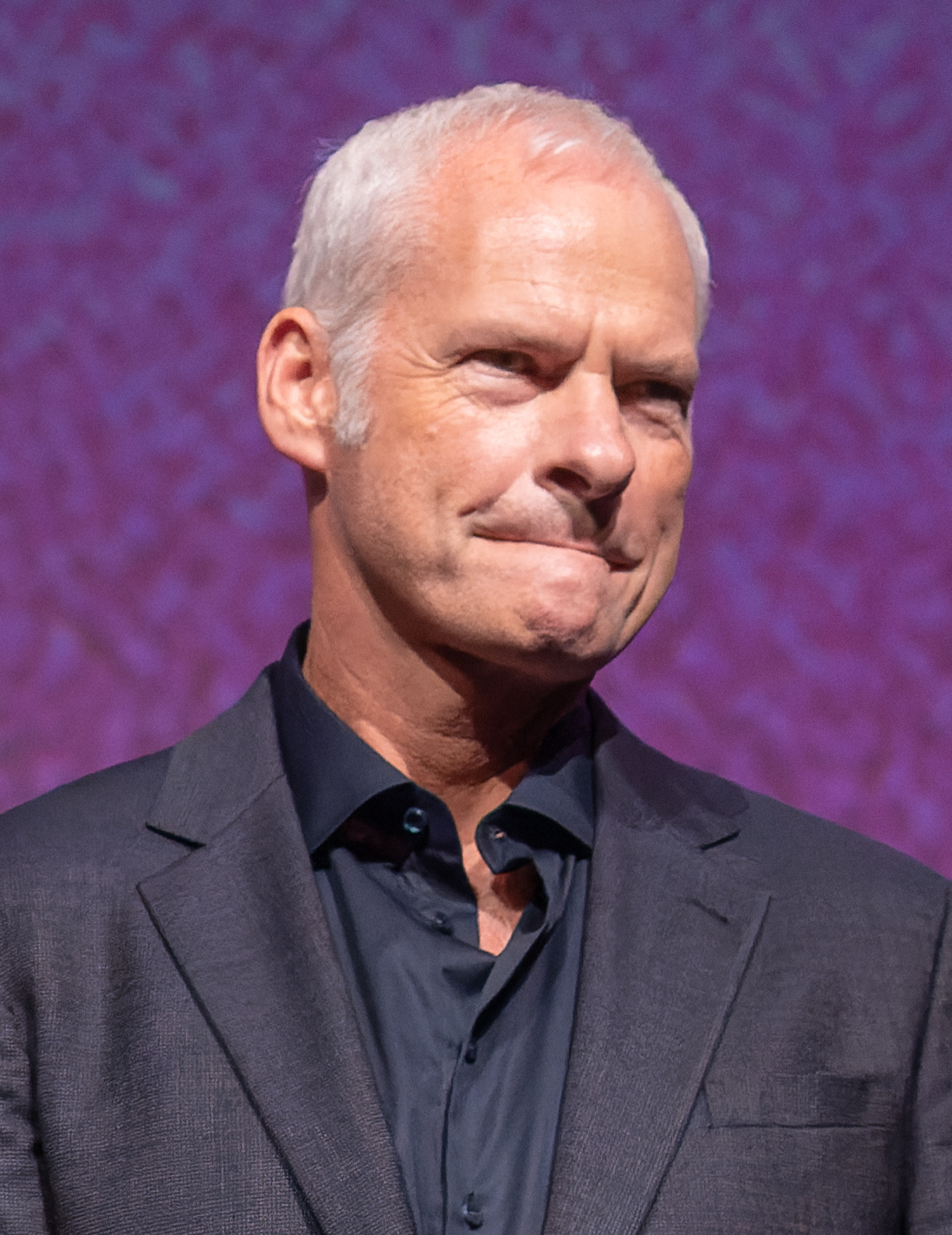
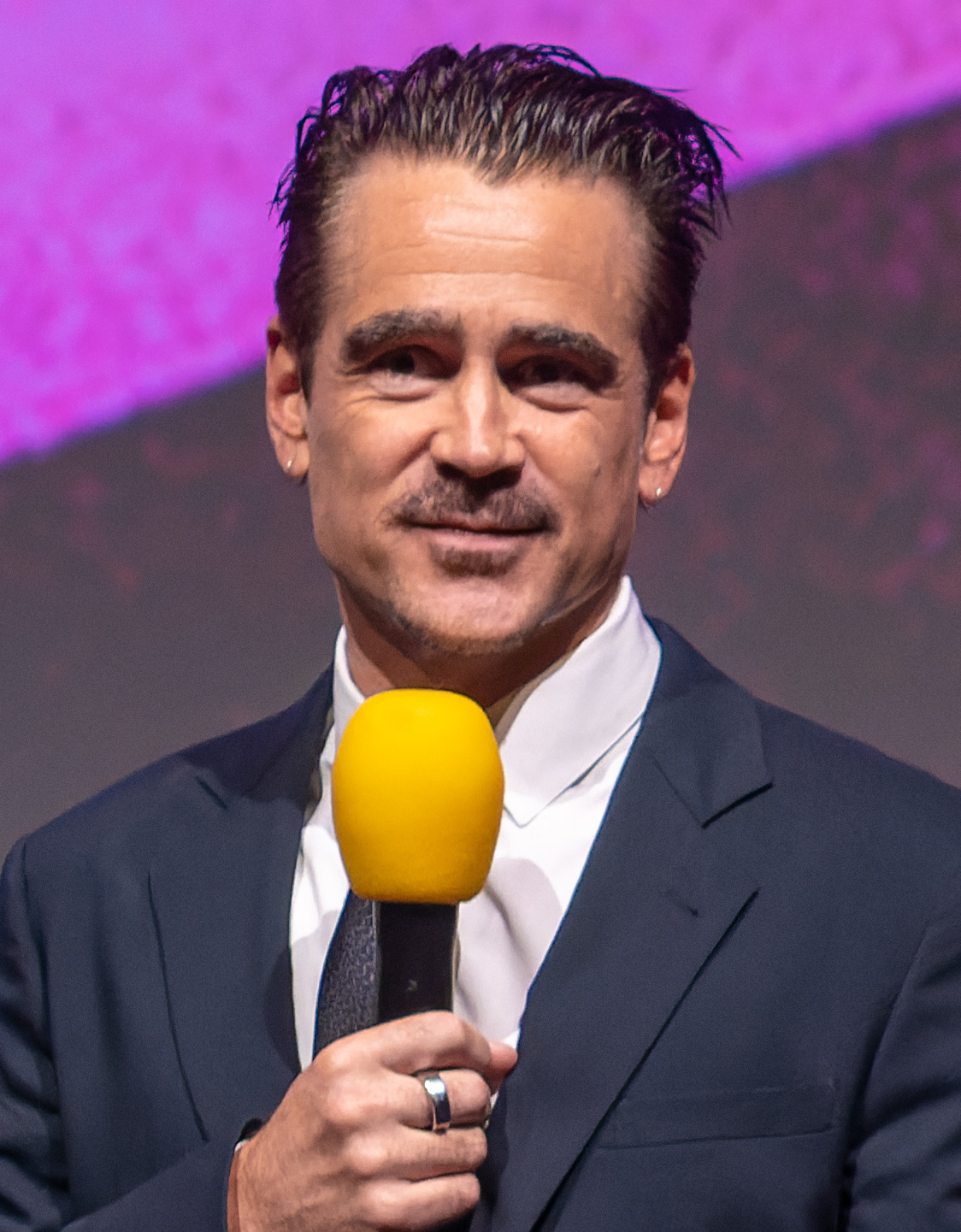
- Martin McDonagh (left) received widespread critical acclaim for his screenplay and direction, as did Colin Farrell (right) for his performance as Pádraic Súilleabháin.
Accolades
Award	Wins	Nominations
AACTA International Awards	3	6
AARP Movies for Grownups Awards	0	1
Academy Awards	0	9
ACE Eddie Awards	0	1
Alliance of Women Film Journalists	4	9
American Film Institute Awards	1	1
Artios Awards	1	1
Austin Film Critics Association	2	9
Boston Online Film Critics Association	4	4
Boston Society of Film Critics	4	4
British Academy Film Awards	4	10
British Society of Cinematographers	0	1
Chicago Film Critics Association	4	7
Chlotrudis Society for Independent Films	2	4
Critics' Choice Awards	0	9
Dallas–Fort Worth Film Critics Association	3	6
Directors Guild of America Awards	0	1
Dorian Awards	0	5
Dublin Film Critics' Circle	2	6
Florida Film Critics Circle	1	5
Georgia Film Critics Association	1	7
Golden Globe Awards	3	8
Golden Raspberry Awards	1	1
Golden Reel Awards	1	1
Golden Trailer Awards	0	1
Gotham Independent Film Awards	0	1
Hollywood Critics Association	0	7
Hollywood Critics Association Creative Arts Awards	0	1
Hollywood Music in Media Awards	0	1
Houston Film Critics Society	3	9
International Cinephile Society	1	6
Irish Film & Television Awards	3	11
Kansas City Film Critics Circle	1	3
Location Managers Guild Awards	0	1
London Film Critics' Circle	5	8
Los Angeles Film Critics Association	1	1
Mill Valley Film Festival	1	1
National Board of Review	4	4
National Society of Film Critics	3	4
New York Film Critics Circle	2	2
New York Film Critics Online	5	5
Online Film Critics Society	5	9
Producers Guild of America Awards	0	1
San Diego Film Critics Society	6	11
San Diego International Film Festival	2	2
San Francisco Bay Area Film Critics Circle	3	11
Santa Barbara International Film Festival	2	2
Satellite Awards	1	8
Screen Actors Guild Awards	0	5
Seattle Film Critics Society	3	9
Society of Composers & Lyricists	0	1
St. Louis Film Critics Association	5	11
Toronto Film Critics Association	1	4
Vancouver Film Critics Circle	3	7
Venice International Film Festival	2	3
Washington D.C. Area Film Critics Association	2	8
Women Film Critics Circle	1	1

Totals (Note: Certain award groups do not simply award one winner. They acknowledge several different recipients, have runners-up, and have third place. Since this is a specific recognition and is different from losing an award, runner-up mentions are considered wins in this award tally. For simplification and to avoid errors, each award in this list has been presumed to have had a prior nomination.)
- Wins: 124
- Nominations: 277

The Banshees of Inisherin is a 2022 black tragicomedy film directed, written, and co-produced by Martin McDonagh. Set on a remote, fictional island off the west coast of Ireland in the 1920s, the film follows two lifelong friends (Colin Farrell and Brendan Gleeson) who find themselves at an impasse when one abruptly ends their relationship, with alarming consequences for both of them; Kerry Condon and Barry Keoghan also star. The film received widespread critical acclaim, with particular praise for McDonagh's direction and screenplay, the performances of the cast, and Carter Burwell's score. It premiered in competition at the 79th Venice International Film Festival, where Farrell and McDonagh won the awards for Best Actor and Best Screenplay, respectively.

The film received a leading eight nominations at the 80th Golden Globe Awards, the most achieved by any film since Cold Mountain in 2004, winning three: Best Motion Picture – Musical or Comedy, Best Actor – Musical or Comedy (Farrell), and Best Screenplay. It also received nine nominations at the 95th Academy Awards and 28th Critics' Choice Awards, respectively, but went home empty-handed at both ceremonies. The film received ten nominations at the 76th British Academy Film Awards as well, winning four.

At the 29th Screen Actors Guild Awards, the film received five nominations, alongside Everything Everywhere All at Once, tying the record for the most nominations with Shakespeare in Love (1998), Chicago (2002), and Doubt (2008); however, it went on to win none of them. It was also named one of the Top Ten Films of 2022 by the National Board of Review.

== Accolades ==
Award	Date of ceremony	Category	Recipient(s)	Result	Ref.
AACTA International Awards	24 February 2023	Best Film	The Banshees of Inisherin	Nominated	
AACTA International Awards	24 February 2023	Best Direction	Martin McDonagh	Nominated	
AACTA International Awards	24 February 2023	Best Actor	Colin Farrell	Nominated	
AACTA International Awards	24 February 2023	Best Supporting Actor	Brendan Gleeson	Won	
AACTA International Awards	24 February 2023	Best Supporting Actress	Kerry Condon	Won	
AACTA International Awards	24 February 2023	Best Screenplay	Martin McDonagh	Won	
AARP Movies for Grownups Awards	28 January 2023	Best Supporting Actor	Brendan Gleeson	Nominated	
Academy Awards	12 March 2023	Best Picture	Graham Broadbent, Pete Czernin, and Martin McDonagh	Nominated	
Academy Awards	12 March 2023	Best Director	Martin McDonagh	Nominated	
Academy Awards	12 March 2023	Best Actor	Colin Farrell	Nominated	
Academy Awards	12 March 2023	Best Supporting Actor	Brendan Gleeson	Nominated	
Academy Awards	12 March 2023	Best Supporting Actor	Barry Keoghan	Nominated	
Academy Awards	12 March 2023	Best Supporting Actress	Kerry Condon	Nominated	
Academy Awards	12 March 2023	Best Original Screenplay	Martin McDonagh	Nominated	
Academy Awards	12 March 2023	Best Film Editing	Mikkel E. G. Nielsen	Nominated	
Academy Awards	12 March 2023	Best Original Score	Carter Burwell	Nominated	
ACE Eddie Awards	5 March 2023	Best Edited Feature Film (Comedy)	Mikkel E. G. Nielsen	Nominated	
Alliance of Women Film Journalists	5 January 2023	Best Film	The Banshees of Inisherin	Won	
Alliance of Women Film Journalists	5 January 2023	Best Director	Martin McDonagh	Nominated	
Alliance of Women Film Journalists	5 January 2023	Best Actor	Colin Farrell	Won	
Alliance of Women Film Journalists	5 January 2023	Best Actor in a Supporting Role	Brendan Gleeson	Nominated	
Alliance of Women Film Journalists	5 January 2023	Best Actor in a Supporting Role	Barry Keoghan	Nominated	
Alliance of Women Film Journalists	5 January 2023	Best Actress in a Supporting Role	Kerry Condon	Won (Note: Tied with Jamie Lee Curtis for Everything Everywhere All at Once.)	
Alliance of Women Film Journalists	5 January 2023	Best Screenplay – Original	Martin McDonagh	Won	
Alliance of Women Film Journalists	5 January 2023	Best Ensemble Cast – Casting Director	Louise Kiely	Nominated	
Alliance of Women Film Journalists	5 January 2023	Best Cinematography	Ben Davis	Nominated	
American Film Institute Awards	9 December 2022	AFI Special Award	The Banshees of Inisherin	Won	
Artios Awards	9 March 2023	Studio or Independent – Drama	Louise Kiely	Won	
Austin Film Critics Association	10 January 2023	Top Ten Films	The Banshees of Inisherin	2nd place	
Austin Film Critics Association	10 January 2023	Best Director	Martin McDonagh	Nominated	
Austin Film Critics Association	10 January 2023	Best Actor	Colin Farrell	Won	
Austin Film Critics Association	10 January 2023	Best Supporting Actor	Brendan Gleeson	Nominated	
Austin Film Critics Association	10 January 2023	Best Supporting Actor	Barry Keoghan	Nominated	
Austin Film Critics Association	10 January 2023	Best Supporting Actress	Kerry Condon	Nominated	
Austin Film Critics Association	10 January 2023	Best Original Screenplay	Martin McDonagh	Nominated	
Austin Film Critics Association	10 January 2023	Best Score	Carter Burwell	Nominated	
Austin Film Critics Association	10 January 2023	Best Ensemble	The Banshees of Inisherin	Nominated	
Boston Online Film Critics Association	17 December 2022	Best Picture	The Banshees of Inisherin	Won	
Boston Online Film Critics Association	17 December 2022	Best Actor	Colin Farrell	Won	
Boston Online Film Critics Association	17 December 2022	Best Supporting Actress	Kerry Condon	Won	
Boston Online Film Critics Association	17 December 2022	Best Screenplay	Martin McDonagh	Won	
Boston Society of Film Critics	11 December 2022	Best English Language Film	The Banshees of Inisherin	Won	
Boston Society of Film Critics	11 December 2022	Best Actor	Colin Farrell	Won	
Boston Society of Film Critics	11 December 2022	Best Supporting Actress	Kerry Condon	Won	
Boston Society of Film Critics	11 December 2022	Best Original Screenplay	Martin McDonagh	Won	
British Academy Film Awards	19 February 2023	Best Film	Graham Broadbent, Pete Czernin, and Martin McDonagh	Nominated	
British Academy Film Awards	19 February 2023	Outstanding British Film	Graham Broadbent, Pete Czernin, and Martin McDonagh	Won	
British Academy Film Awards	19 February 2023	Best Director	Martin McDonagh	Nominated	
British Academy Film Awards	19 February 2023	Best Actor in a Leading Role	Colin Farrell	Nominated	
British Academy Film Awards	19 February 2023	Best Actor in a Supporting Role	Brendan Gleeson	Nominated	
British Academy Film Awards	19 February 2023	Best Actor in a Supporting Role	Barry Keoghan	Won	
British Academy Film Awards	19 February 2023	Best Actress in a Supporting Role	Kerry Condon	Won	
British Academy Film Awards	19 February 2023	Best Original Screenplay	Martin McDonagh	Won	
British Academy Film Awards	19 February 2023	Best Editing	Mikkel E. G. Nielsen	Nominated	
British Academy Film Awards	19 February 2023	Best Original Score	Carter Burwell	Nominated	
British Society of Cinematographers	11 February 2023	Cinematography in a Feature Film	Ben Davis	Nominated	
Chicago Film Critics Association	14 December 2022	Best Film	The Banshees of Inisherin	Won	
Chicago Film Critics Association	14 December 2022	Best Actor	Colin Farrell	Won	
Chicago Film Critics Association	14 December 2022	Best Supporting Actor	Brendan Gleeson	Nominated	
Chicago Film Critics Association	14 December 2022	Best Supporting Actor	Barry Keoghan	Nominated	
Chicago Film Critics Association	14 December 2022	Best Supporting Actress	Kerry Condon	Won	
Chicago Film Critics Association	14 December 2022	Best Original Screenplay	Martin McDonagh	Won	
Chicago Film Critics Association	14 December 2022	Best Original Score	Carter Burwell	Nominated	
Chlotrudis Society for Independent Films	19 March 2023	Best Supporting Actor	Brendan Gleeson	Nominated	
Chlotrudis Society for Independent Films	19 March 2023	Best Supporting Actor	Barry Keoghan	Won	
Chlotrudis Society for Independent Films	19 March 2023	Best Supporting Actress	Kerry Condon	Won	
Chlotrudis Society for Independent Films	19 March 2023	Best Original Screenplay	Martin McDonagh	Nominated	
Critics' Choice Awards	15 January 2023	Best Picture	The Banshees of Inisherin	Nominated	
Critics' Choice Awards	15 January 2023	Best Comedy	The Banshees of Inisherin	Nominated	
Critics' Choice Awards	15 January 2023	Best Director	Martin McDonagh	Nominated	
Critics' Choice Awards	15 January 2023	Best Actor	Colin Farrell	Nominated	
Critics' Choice Awards	15 January 2023	Best Supporting Actor	Brendan Gleeson	Nominated	
Critics' Choice Awards	15 January 2023	Best Supporting Actor	Barry Keoghan	Nominated	
Critics' Choice Awards	15 January 2023	Best Supporting Actress	Kerry Condon	Nominated	
Critics' Choice Awards	15 January 2023	Best Original Screenplay	Martin McDonagh	Nominated	
Critics' Choice Awards	15 January 2023	Best Acting Ensemble	The Banshees of Inisherin	Nominated	
Dallas–Fort Worth Film Critics Association	19 December 2022	Best Film	The Banshees of Inisherin	2nd place	
Dallas–Fort Worth Film Critics Association	19 December 2022	Best Director	Martin McDonagh	4th place	
Dallas–Fort Worth Film Critics Association	19 December 2022	Best Actor	Colin Farrell	Won	
Dallas–Fort Worth Film Critics Association	19 December 2022	Best Supporting Actor	Brendan Gleeson	2nd place	
Dallas–Fort Worth Film Critics Association	19 December 2022	Best Supporting Actress	Kerry Condon	Won	
Dallas–Fort Worth Film Critics Association	19 December 2022	Best Screenplay	Martin McDonagh	Won	
Directors Guild of America Awards	18 February 2023	Outstanding Directorial Achievement in Theatrical Feature Film	Martin McDonagh	Nominated	
Dorian Awards	23 February 2023	Film of the Year	The Banshees of Inisherin	Nominated	
Dorian Awards	23 February 2023	Director of the Year	Martin McDonagh	Nominated	
Dorian Awards	23 February 2023	Film Performance of the Year	Colin Farrell	Nominated	
Dorian Awards	23 February 2023	Supporting Film Performance of the Year	Barry Keoghan	Nominated	
Dorian Awards	23 February 2023	Screenplay of the Year	Martin McDonagh	Nominated	
Dublin Film Critics' Circle	15 December 2022	Best Film	The Banshees of Inisherin	4th place	
Dublin Film Critics' Circle	15 December 2022	Best Director	Martin McDonagh	3rd place	
Dublin Film Critics' Circle	15 December 2022	Best Actor	Colin Farrell	Won	
Dublin Film Critics' Circle	15 December 2022	Best Actress	Kerry Condon	3rd place	
Dublin Film Critics' Circle	15 December 2022	Best Screenplay	Martin McDonagh	Won	
Dublin Film Critics' Circle	15 December 2022	Best Cinematography	Ben Davis	Runner-up	
Florida Film Critics Circle	22 December 2022	Best Actor	Colin Farrell	Won	
Florida Film Critics Circle	22 December 2022	Best Supporting Actor	Brendan Gleeson	Nominated	
Florida Film Critics Circle	22 December 2022	Best Supporting Actress	Kerry Condon	Nominated	
Florida Film Critics Circle	22 December 2022	Best Original Screenplay	Martin McDonagh	Runner-up (Note: Tied with Daniel Kwan and Daniel Scheinert for Everything Everywhere All at Once.)	
Florida Film Critics Circle	22 December 2022	Best Ensemble	The Banshees of Inisherin	Nominated	
Georgia Film Critics Association	13 January 2023	Best Picture	The Banshees of Inisherin	Nominated	
Georgia Film Critics Association	13 January 2023	Best Actor	Colin Farrell	Won	
Georgia Film Critics Association	13 January 2023	Best Supporting Actor	Brendan Gleeson	Runner-up	
Georgia Film Critics Association	13 January 2023	Best Supporting Actor	Barry Keoghan	Nominated	
Georgia Film Critics Association	13 January 2023	Best Supporting Actress	Kerry Condon	Nominated	
Georgia Film Critics Association	13 January 2023	Best Original Screenplay	Martin McDonagh	Runner-up	
Georgia Film Critics Association	13 January 2023	Best Ensemble	The Banshees of Inisherin	Nominated	
Golden Globe Awards	10 January 2023	Best Motion Picture – Musical or Comedy	The Banshees of Inisherin	Won	
Golden Globe Awards	10 January 2023	Best Director	Martin McDonagh	Nominated	
Golden Globe Awards	10 January 2023	Best Actor in a Motion Picture – Musical or Comedy	Colin Farrell	Won	
Golden Globe Awards	10 January 2023	Best Supporting Actor – Motion Picture	Brendan Gleeson	Nominated	
Golden Globe Awards	10 January 2023	Best Supporting Actor – Motion Picture	Barry Keoghan	Nominated	
Golden Globe Awards	10 January 2023	Best Supporting Actress – Motion Picture	Kerry Condon	Nominated	
Golden Globe Awards	10 January 2023	Best Screenplay	Martin McDonagh	Won	
Golden Globe Awards	10 January 2023	Best Original Score	Carter Burwell	Nominated	
Golden Raspberry Awards	10 March 2023	Razzie Redeemer Award	Colin Farrell	Won	
Golden Reel Awards	26 February 2023	Outstanding Achievement in Sound Editing – Feature Dialogue / ADR	Simon Chase, Rebecca Glover, Julien Naudin, and Joakim Sundström	Won	
Golden Trailer Awards	29 June 2023	Best Comedy	The Banshees of Inisherin (Giaronomo Productions)	Nominated	
Gotham Independent Film Awards	28 November 2022	Best International Feature	The Banshees of Inisherin	Nominated	
Hollywood Critics Association	24 February 2023	Best Picture	The Banshees of Inisherin	Nominated	
Hollywood Critics Association	24 February 2023	Best Director	Martin McDonagh	Nominated	
Hollywood Critics Association	24 February 2023	Best Actor	Colin Farrell	Nominated	
Hollywood Critics Association	24 February 2023	Best Supporting Actor	Barry Keoghan	Nominated	
Hollywood Critics Association	24 February 2023	Best Supporting Actor	Brendan Gleeson	Nominated	
Hollywood Critics Association	24 February 2023	Best Supporting Actress	Kerry Condon	Nominated	
Hollywood Critics Association	24 February 2023	Best Original Screenplay	Martin McDonagh	Nominated	
Hollywood Critics Association Creative Arts Awards	24 February 2023	Best Score	Carter Burwell	Nominated	
Hollywood Music in Media Awards	16 November 2022	Best Original Score in a Feature Film	Carter Burwell	Nominated	
Houston Film Critics Society	18 February 2023	Best Picture	The Banshees of Inisherin	Nominated	
Houston Film Critics Society	18 February 2023	Best Director	Martin McDonagh	Nominated	
Houston Film Critics Society	18 February 2023	Best Actor	Colin Farrell	Won	
Houston Film Critics Society	18 February 2023	Best Supporting Actor	Brendan Gleeson	Nominated	
Houston Film Critics Society	18 February 2023	Best Supporting Actor	Barry Keoghan	Nominated	
Houston Film Critics Society	18 February 2023	Best Supporting Actress	Kerry Condon	Won	
Houston Film Critics Society	18 February 2023	Best Screenplay	Martin McDonagh	Won	
Houston Film Critics Society	18 February 2023	Best Original Score	Carter Burwell	Nominated	
Houston Film Critics Society	18 February 2023	Best Ensemble Cast	The Banshees of Inisherin	Nominated	
International Cinephile Society	12 February 2023	Picture	The Banshees of Inisherin	11th place	
International Cinephile Society	12 February 2023	Actor	Colin Farrell	Nominated	
International Cinephile Society	12 February 2023	Supporting Actor	Barry Keoghan	Nominated	
International Cinephile Society	12 February 2023	Supporting Actress	Kerry Condon	Nominated	
International Cinephile Society	12 February 2023	Original Screenplay	Martin McDonagh	Nominated	
International Cinephile Society	12 February 2023	Ensemble	The Banshees of Inisherin	Nominated	
Irish Film & Television Awards	7 May 2023	Best Film	The Banshees of Inisherin	Won	
Irish Film & Television Awards	7 May 2023	Best Director – Film	Martin McDonagh	Nominated	
Irish Film & Television Awards	7 May 2023	Best Actor in a Lead Role – Film	Colin Farrell	Nominated	
Irish Film & Television Awards	7 May 2023	Best Actor in a Supporting Role – Film	Brendan Gleeson	Won	
Irish Film & Television Awards	7 May 2023	Best Actor in a Supporting Role – Film	Barry Keoghan	Nominated	
Irish Film & Television Awards	7 May 2023	Best Actress in a Supporting Role – Film	Kerry Condon	Won	
Irish Film & Television Awards	7 May 2023	Best Script – Film	Martin McDonagh	Nominated	
Irish Film & Television Awards	7 May 2023	Best Costume Design	Eimer Ní Mhaoldomhnaigh	Nominated	
Irish Film & Television Awards	7 May 2023	Best Hair & Make-Up	Orla Carroll, Lynn Johnston, and Dan Martin	Nominated	
Irish Film & Television Awards	7 May 2023	Best Sound	Chris Burdon, Johnathan Rush, Joakim Sundström, and Simon Willis	Nominated	
Irish Film & Television Awards	7 May 2023	Best VFX	Paul Byrne and Simon Hughes	Nominated	
Kansas City Film Critics Circle	22 January 2023	Best Lead Actor	Colin Farrell	Won	
Kansas City Film Critics Circle	22 January 2023	Best Supporting Actor	Brendan Gleeson	Runner-up	
Kansas City Film Critics Circle	22 January 2023	Best Original Screenplay	Martin McDonagh	Runner-up	
Location Managers Guild Awards	27 August 2023	Outstanding Locations in a Period Feature Film	The Banshees of Inisherin	Nominated	
London Film Critics' Circle	5 February 2023	Film of the Year	The Banshees of Inisherin	Nominated	
London Film Critics' Circle	5 February 2023	British/Irish Film of the Year	The Banshees of Inisherin	Won	
London Film Critics' Circle	5 February 2023	Director of the Year	Martin McDonagh	Nominated	
London Film Critics' Circle	5 February 2023	Actor of the Year	Colin Farrell	Won	
London Film Critics' Circle	5 February 2023	British/Irish Actor of the Year (for body of work)	Colin Farrell	Nominated	
London Film Critics' Circle	5 February 2023	Supporting Actor of the Year	Brendan Gleeson	Nominated	
London Film Critics' Circle	5 February 2023	Supporting Actor of the Year	Barry Keoghan	Won	
London Film Critics' Circle	5 February 2023	Supporting Actress of the Year	Kerry Condon	Won	
London Film Critics' Circle	5 February 2023	Screenwriter of the Year	Martin McDonagh	Won	
Los Angeles Film Critics Association	11 December 2022	Best Screenplay	Martin McDonagh	Runner-up	
Mill Valley Film Festival	6–16 October 2022	Audience Favorite – World Cinema	The Banshees of Inisherin	Won	
National Board of Review	8 December 2022	Top Ten Films	The Banshees of Inisherin	Won	
National Board of Review	8 December 2022	Best Actor	Colin Farrell	Won	
National Board of Review	8 December 2022	Best Supporting Actor	Brendan Gleeson	Won	
National Board of Review	8 December 2022	Best Original Screenplay	Martin McDonagh	Won	
National Society of Film Critics	7 January 2023	Best Actor	Colin Farrell	Won (Note: Shared with After Yang.)	
National Society of Film Critics	7 January 2023	Best Supporting Actor	Barry Keoghan	3rd place	
National Society of Film Critics	7 January 2023	Best Supporting Actress	Kerry Condon	Won	
National Society of Film Critics	7 January 2023	Best Screenplay	Martin McDonagh	Runner-up	
New York Film Critics Circle	2 December 2022	Best Actor	Colin Farrell	Won	
New York Film Critics Circle	2 December 2022	Best Screenplay	Martin McDonagh	Won	
New York Film Critics Online	11 December 2022	Best Picture	The Banshees of Inisherin	Won	
New York Film Critics Online	11 December 2022	Best Director	Martin McDonagh	Won	
New York Film Critics Online	11 December 2022	Best Actor	Colin Farrell	Won	
New York Film Critics Online	11 December 2022	Best Supporting Actor	Brendan Gleeson	Won	
New York Film Critics Online	11 December 2022	Best Screenplay	Martin McDonagh	Won	
Online Film Critics Society	23 January 2023	Best Picture	The Banshees of Inisherin	Runner-up	
Online Film Critics Society	23 January 2023	Best Director	Martin McDonagh	Nominated	
Online Film Critics Society	23 January 2023	Best Actor	Colin Farrell	Won	
Online Film Critics Society	23 January 2023	Best Supporting Actor	Brendan Gleeson	Nominated	
Online Film Critics Society	23 January 2023	Best Supporting Actor	Barry Keoghan	Nominated	
Online Film Critics Society	23 January 2023	Best Supporting Actress	Kerry Condon	Won	
Online Film Critics Society	23 January 2023	Best Original Screenplay	Martin McDonagh	Won	
Online Film Critics Society	23 January 2023	Best Cinematography	Ben Davis	Nominated	
Online Film Critics Society	23 January 2023	Best Original Score	Carter Burwell	Won	
Producers Guild of America Awards	25 February 2023	Outstanding Producer of Theatrical Motion Pictures	Graham Broadbent, Pete Czernin, and Martin McDonagh	Nominated	
San Diego Film Critics Society	6 January 2023	Best Film	The Banshees of Inisherin	Won	
San Diego Film Critics Society	6 January 2023	Best Director	Martin McDonagh	Nominated	
San Diego Film Critics Society	6 January 2023	Best Actor	Colin Farrell	Won	
San Diego Film Critics Society	6 January 2023	Best Supporting Actor	Brendan Gleeson	Won	
San Diego Film Critics Society	6 January 2023	Best Supporting Actor	Barry Keoghan	Nominated	
San Diego Film Critics Society	6 January 2023	Best Supporting Actress	Kerry Condon	Won	
San Diego Film Critics Society	6 January 2023	Best Original Screenplay	Martin McDonagh	Won	
San Diego Film Critics Society	6 January 2023	Best Cinematography	Ben Davis	Runner-up	
San Diego Film Critics Society	6 January 2023	Best Editing	Mikkel E. G. Nielsen	Nominated	
San Diego Film Critics Society	6 January 2023	Best Ensemble	The Banshees of Inisherin	Runner-up (Note: Tied with Women Talking.)	
San Diego Film Critics Society	6 January 2023	Best Use of Music	The Banshees of Inisherin	Nominated	
San Diego Film Critics Society	6 January 2023	Body of Work	Colin Farrell	Won (Note: Shared with After Yang, The Batman, and Thirteen Lives.)	
San Diego International Film Festival	19–23 October 2022	Audience Choice Gala	The Banshees of Inisherin	Won	
San Diego International Film Festival	19–23 October 2022	Best Gala Film	The Banshees of Inisherin	Won	
San Francisco Bay Area Film Critics Circle	9 January 2023	Best Film	The Banshees of Inisherin	Won	
San Francisco Bay Area Film Critics Circle	9 January 2023	Best Director	Martin McDonagh	Nominated	
San Francisco Bay Area Film Critics Circle	9 January 2023	Best Actor	Colin Farrell	Won	
San Francisco Bay Area Film Critics Circle	9 January 2023	Best Supporting Actor	Brendan Gleeson	Nominated	
San Francisco Bay Area Film Critics Circle	9 January 2023	Best Supporting Actor	Barry Keoghan	Nominated	
San Francisco Bay Area Film Critics Circle	9 January 2023	Best Supporting Actress	Kerry Condon	Won	
San Francisco Bay Area Film Critics Circle	9 January 2023	Best Original Screenplay	Martin McDonagh	Nominated	
San Francisco Bay Area Film Critics Circle	9 January 2023	Best Cinematography	Ben Davis	Nominated	
San Francisco Bay Area Film Critics Circle	9 January 2023	Best Film Editing	Mikkel E. G. Nielsen	Nominated	
San Francisco Bay Area Film Critics Circle	9 January 2023	Best Original Score	Carter Burwell	Nominated	
San Francisco Bay Area Film Critics Circle	9 January 2023	Best Production Design	Mark Tildesley (production designer); Michael Standish (set decorator)	Nominated	
Santa Barbara International Film Festival	8–18 February 2023	Outstanding Director of the Year	Martin McDonagh	Won	
Santa Barbara International Film Festival	8–18 February 2023	Virtuosos Award	Kerry Condon	Won	
Satellite Awards	3 March 2023	Best Motion Picture – Comedy or Musical	The Banshees of Inisherin	Nominated	
Satellite Awards	3 March 2023	Best Director	Martin McDonaugh	Nominated	
Satellite Awards	3 March 2023	Best Actor in a Motion Picture – Comedy or Musical	Colin Farrell	Nominated	
Satellite Awards	3 March 2023	Best Actor in a Supporting Role	Brendan Gleeson	Nominated	
Satellite Awards	3 March 2023	Best Actress in a Supporting Role	Kerry Condon	Nominated	
Satellite Awards	3 March 2023	Best Original Screenplay	Martin McDonaugh	Won	
Satellite Awards	3 March 2023	Best Cinematography	Ben Davis	Nominated	
Satellite Awards	3 March 2023	Best Original Score	Carter Burwell	Nominated	
Screen Actors Guild Awards	26 February 2023	Outstanding Performance by a Cast in a Motion Picture	Kerry Condon, Colin Farrell, Brendan Gleeson, and Barry Keoghan	Nominated	
Screen Actors Guild Awards	26 February 2023	Outstanding Performance by a Male Actor in a Leading Role	Colin Farrell	Nominated	
Screen Actors Guild Awards	26 February 2023	Outstanding Performance by a Male Actor in a Supporting Role	Brendan Gleeson	Nominated	
Screen Actors Guild Awards	26 February 2023	Outstanding Performance by a Male Actor in a Supporting Role	Barry Keoghan	Nominated	
Screen Actors Guild Awards	26 February 2023	Outstanding Performance by a Female Actor in a Supporting Role	Kerry Condon	Nominated	
Seattle Film Critics Society	17 January 2023	Best Picture	The Banshees of Inisherin	Nominated	
Seattle Film Critics Society	17 January 2023	Best Director	Martin McDonagh	Nominated	
Seattle Film Critics Society	17 January 2023	Best Actor in a Leading Role	Colin Farrell	Won	
Seattle Film Critics Society	17 January 2023	Best Actor in a Supporting Role	Brendan Gleeson	Nominated	
Seattle Film Critics Society	17 January 2023	Best Actor in a Supporting Role	Barry Keoghan	Nominated	
Seattle Film Critics Society	17 January 2023	Best Actress in a Supporting Role	Kerry Condon	Won	
Seattle Film Critics Society	17 January 2023	Best Screenplay	Martin McDonagh	Won	
Seattle Film Critics Society	17 January 2023	Best Ensemble Cast	The Banshees of Inisherin	Nominated	
Seattle Film Critics Society	17 January 2023	Best Original Score	Carter Burwell	Nominated	
Society of Composers & Lyricists	15 February 2023	Outstanding Score for a Studio Film	Carter Burwell	Nominated	
St. Louis Film Critics Association	18 December 2022	Best Film	The Banshees of Inisherin	Nominated	
St. Louis Film Critics Association	18 December 2022	Best Director	Martin McDonagh	Nominated	
St. Louis Film Critics Association	18 December 2022	Best Actor	Colin Farrell	Nominated	
St. Louis Film Critics Association	18 December 2022	Best Supporting Actor	Brendan Gleeson	Runner-up	
St. Louis Film Critics Association	18 December 2022	Best Supporting Actress	Kerry Condon	Won	
St. Louis Film Critics Association	18 December 2022	Best Original Screenplay	Martin McDonagh	Won	
St. Louis Film Critics Association	18 December 2022	Best Cinematography	Ben Davis	Won	
St. Louis Film Critics Association	18 December 2022	Best Editing	Mikkel E. G. Nielsen	Nominated	
St. Louis Film Critics Association	18 December 2022	Best Production Design	Mark Tildesley	Nominated	
St. Louis Film Critics Association	18 December 2022	Best Score	Carter Burwell	Runner-up (Note: Tied with Michael Giacchino for The Batman and John Williams for The Fabelmans.)	
St. Louis Film Critics Association	18 December 2022	Best Ensemble	The Banshees of Inisherin	Nominated	
Toronto Film Critics Association	8 January 2023	Best Actor	Colin Farrell	Runner-up (Note: Tied with Brendan Fraser for The Whale.)	
Toronto Film Critics Association	8 January 2023	Best Supporting Actor	Brendan Gleeson	Runner-up	
Toronto Film Critics Association	8 January 2023	Best Supporting Actor	Barry Keoghan	Runner-up	
Toronto Film Critics Association	8 January 2023	Best Screenplay	Martin McDonagh	Won	
Vancouver Film Critics Circle	13 February 2023	Best Film	The Banshees of Inisherin	Nominated	
Vancouver Film Critics Circle	13 February 2023	Best Director	Martin McDonagh	Nominated	
Vancouver Film Critics Circle	13 February 2023	Best Actor	Colin Farrell	Won	
Vancouver Film Critics Circle	13 February 2023	Best Supporting Actor	Brendan Gleeson	Won	
Vancouver Film Critics Circle	13 February 2023	Best Supporting Actor	Barry Keoghan	Nominated	
Vancouver Film Critics Circle	13 February 2023	Best Supporting Actress	Kerry Condon	Nominated	
Vancouver Film Critics Circle	13 February 2023	Best Screenplay	Martin McDonagh	Won	
Venice International Film Festival	31 August – 10 September 2022	Golden Lion	Martin McDonagh	Nominated	
Venice International Film Festival	31 August – 10 September 2022	Best Screenplay	Martin McDonagh	Won	
Venice International Film Festival	31 August – 10 September 2022	Volpi Cup for Best Actor	Colin Farrell	Won	
Washington D.C. Area Film Critics Association	12 December 2022	Best Film	The Banshees of Inisherin	Nominated	
Washington D.C. Area Film Critics Association	12 December 2022	Best Director	Martin McDonagh	Nominated	
Washington D.C. Area Film Critics Association	12 December 2022	Best Actor	Colin Farrell	Won	
Washington D.C. Area Film Critics Association	12 December 2022	Best Supporting Actor	Brendan Gleeson	Nominated	
Washington D.C. Area Film Critics Association	12 December 2022	Best Supporting Actor	Barry Keoghan	Nominated	
Washington D.C. Area Film Critics Association	12 December 2022	Best Supporting Actress	Kerry Condon	Won	
Washington D.C. Area Film Critics Association	12 December 2022	Best Original Screenplay	Martin McDonagh	Nominated	
Washington D.C. Area Film Critics Association	12 December 2022	Best Acting Ensemble	The Banshees of Inisherin	Nominated	
Women Film Critics Circle	19 December 2022	Best Actor	Colin Farrell	Runner-up	
