= The Banshees of Inisherin (soundtrack) =

The Banshees of Inisherin (Original Score)

Film score by Carter Burwell
- Released: 21 October 2022
- Genre: Film score
- Length: 33:33
- Label: Hollywood
- Producer: Carter Burwell

Carter Burwell chronology
Catherine Called Birdy (2022)	The Banshees of Inisherin (2022)	To Catch a Killer (2023)

The Banshees of Inisherin (Original Score) is the score album consisting of the original score composed by Carter Burwell for the 2022 film of the same name directed by Martin McDonagh. It was released on 21 October 2022 by Hollywood Records. The album was announced with a three-track sampler debuted on the Deadline Hollywood magazine. Burwell experimented the score with approaching Colin Farrell's character through "the child-like" and "Disney character"-based music as well as fiddle-themed compositions for Brendan Gleeson's character, and non-Irish music, despite the setting in 20th century Ireland. The score received a nomination for Hollywood Music in Media Award for Best Original Score in a Feature Film, as well as Satellite Award and Golden Globe Award nomination in the "Best Original Score" category.

== Development ==
"The music often refuses to get emotional and for some reason, that makes it even more emotional. That has something to do with the whole film. It is very contained. No one ever shouts in the film. It's very quiet and yet so intense and so sad and so funny."

— Carter Burwell

McDonagh's regular collaborator Carter Burwell composed the score. Burwell recalled McDonagh did not want any Irish film music, despite mentioning that "Everything else is very Irish — the accents, the clothes, the situation, the pub. He wasn't clear with me what he wanted to do, but it's clear that what he didn't want it to do was for the music to leave you in Ireland. He wanted it to take you someplace else." While focusing on Farrell's character, Pádraic, he wrote a slow-walking music consisted of celesta, harp, marimba and glockenspiel, that seemed to work "in terms of basically painting him like a man-child" and "almost like a Disney character", as those instruments are found in elementary school. He used celesta for the twinkling effect to Pyotr Ilyich Tchaikovsky's "Dance of the Sugar Plum Fairy", Mister Rogers' Neighborhood theme, and John Williams' Harry Potter music.

During the same time, he had read Grimms' fairy tales to his 11-year old daughter, in which while reading the Grimms' version of Cinderella, where the stepsisters mutilate their feet in order to fit in the glass slipper, Burwell felt the cutting of the limbs, almost not similar to the threat that Colm (Gleeson) makes, saying "I ended up going farther down that road of making the whole story a little bit more fairytale-like". All of the scores, mesh tonal lightness and darkness, making it easier to foreshadow the impending violence, which Burwell adds "Eight octaves down from that, there are these big heavy, low bell tones that have these strange harmonics that are a little foreboding. I don't think you read it necessarily at the very beginning of the movie, but pretty soon it starts to express itself more and more."

Before scoring for the film, McDonagh used a piece of Indonesian gamelan music as a temp track for the film. Hence, Burwell layered gamelan gongs underneath the music, as "It made it not quite so cheery. There's something there that doesn't quite fit, and you can't really put your finger on what it is. There's some mystery at the bottom of the tune." Burwell liked this process as "they're never going to get sentimental. There's no such thing as a sad marimba line. So it kind of inoculates you, using those instruments, from worrying about the music getting actually sad itself."

== Track listing ==
No.	Title	Length
1.	"Walking Home Alone"	1:18
2.	"Night Falls on Inisherin"	0:45
3.	"Marking the Calendar"	1:09
4.	"The Island Comes to Church"	1:10
5.	"Doesn't Time Be Flying"	1:00
6.	"Standing Prayer"	1:30
7.	"Delivering Milk But No News"	1:03
8.	"Colm Takes the Reins"	2:10
9.	"Padraic Wakes – Driving Into the Rain"	1:10
10.	"The First Finger"	1:14
11.	"Padraic and Jenny"	0:48
12.	"Padraic Keeps Quiet"	2:15
13.	"Colm Throws the Balance"	1:50
14.	"Jenny and the Fourth"	1:53
15.	"Dark Padraic"	1:30
16.	"Siobhan Leaves"	1:46
17.	"The Slow Passing of Time"	1:46
18.	"Padraic Leaves the Church"	1:02
19.	"My Life Is on Inisherin"	3:47
20.	"A Smoldering New Day"	1:56
21.	"The Mystery of Inisherin"	2:31
Total length:		33:33

== Reception ==
Jonathan Romney of Screen Daily wrote: "Along with the fiddle music, Carter Burwell's knowing, mock-folksy score is matched with classical passages from Orff, Brahms et al, plus those Bulgarian choral voices that are as balefully banshee-like as you could wish for." Writing for The Guardian, Mark Kermode wrote: "Composer Carter Burwell emphasises the film's fable-like qualities with refrains that sound like off-kilter nursery rhymes played on cracked shellac records." Writing for WhatCulture, Jack Pooley praised Burwell's score complimenting that it "lurches from pithily optimistic to drearily ominous as necessary, its folksy style proving perfectly suited to the movie's visuals and overall tone, and mutated however necessary to match the vibe of a given scene [...] isn't particularly intrusive yet still imbues the picture with a canny, slightly off-kilter atmosphere which befits its at times Shakespearean influences". Hanna Ines Flint of IGN wrote: "The folksy element of Carter Burwell's plucky score has its own sense of humor."

== Accolades ==
Award	Date of ceremony	Category	Recipient	Result	Ref.
Hollywood Music in Media Awards	16 November 2022	Best Original Score in a Feature Film	Carter Burwell	Nominated	
Chicago Film Critics Association	14 December 2022	Best Original Score	Carter Burwell	Nominated	
St. Louis Film Critics Association	18 December 2022	Best Score	Carter Burwell	Runner-up (Note: Tied with Michael Giacchino for The Batman and John Williams for The Fabelmans)	
Indiana Film Journalists Association	19 December 2022	Best Musical Score	Carter Burwell	Nominated	
San Francisco Bay Area Film Critics Circle	9 January 2023	Best Original Score	Carter Burwell	Nominated	
Austin Film Critics Association	10 January 2023	Best Original Score	Carter Burwell	Nominated	
Golden Globe Awards	10 January 2023	Best Original Score	Carter Burwell	Nominated	
Iowa Film Critics Association	12 January 2023	Best Original Score	Carter Burwell	Runner-up (Note: Tied with Hildur Guðnadóttir for Women Talking)	
Online Film Critics Society	23 January 2023	Best Original Score	Carter Burwell	Won	
Society of Composers & Lyricists	15 February 2023	Outstanding Score for a Studio Film	Carter Burwell	Nominated	
Houston Film Critics Society	18 February 2023	Best Original Score	Carter Burwell	Nominated	
British Academy Film Awards	19 February 2023	Best Original Score	Carter Burwell	Nominated	
Hollywood Critics Association	24 February 2023	Best Score	Carter Burwell	Nominated	
Satellite Awards	3 March 2023	Best Original Score	Carter Burwell	Nominated	
Academy Awards	12 March 2023	Best Original Score	Carter Burwell	Nominated	
