= 12th AACTA International Awards =

Australian film and TV awards ceremony in 2023

- Date: 24 February 2023

Highlights
- Best Film: Avatar: The Way of Water
- Most awards: The Banshees of Inisherin (3)
- Most nominations: Everything Everywhere All at Once / The Banshees of Inisherin (6)

The 12th Australian Academy of Cinema and Television Arts International Awards, commonly known as the AACTA International Awards, is presented by the Australian Academy of Cinema and Television Arts (AACTA), a non-profit organisation whose aim is to identify, award, promote and celebrate Australia's greatest achievements in film and television. Awards were handed out for the best films of 2022, regardless of the country of origin, and are the international counterpart to the awards for Australian films. Winners were announced virtually on 24 February 2023.

Nominations were announced on 15 December 2022, with Everything Everywhere All at Once and The Banshees of Inisherin leading with six each.

== Winners and nominees ==
=== Film ===
Best Film: Avatar: The Way of Water; Elvis; Everything Everywhere All at Once; The Banshees of Inisherin; Top Gun: Maverick	Best Direction: Baz Luhrmann – Elvis; James Cameron – Avatar: The Way of Water; Daniel Kwan and Daniel Scheinert – Everything Everywhere All at Once; Martin McDonagh – The Banshees of Inisherin; Steven Spielberg – The Fabelmans
Best Actor: Austin Butler – Elvis as Elvis Presley; Joel Edgerton – The Stranger as Mark Frame; Colin Farrell – The Banshees of Inisherin as Pádraic Súilleabháin; Brendan Fraser – The Whale as Charlie; Hugh Jackman – The Son as Peter Miller	Best Actress: Cate Blanchett – Tár as Lydia Tár; Ana de Armas – Blonde as Norma Jean Mortenson / Marilyn Monroe; Margot Robbie – Babylon as Nellie LaRoy; Michelle Williams – The Fabelmans as Mitzi Schildkraut-Fabelman; Michelle Yeoh – Everything Everywhere All at Once as Evelyn Quan Wang
Best Supporting Actor: Brendan Gleeson – The Banshees of Inisherin as Colm Doherty; Woody Harrelson – Triangle of Sadness as The Captain; Sean Harris – The Stranger as Henry Peter Teague / Peter Morley; Brad Pitt – Babylon as Jack Conrad; Ke Huy Quan – Everything Everywhere All at Once as Waymong Wang	Best Supporting Actress: Kerry Condon – The Banshees of Inisherin as Siobhán Súilleabháin; Jamie Lee Curtis – Everything Everywhere All at Once as Deirdre Beaubeirdre; Olivia DeJonge – Elvis as Priscilla Presley; Stephanie Hsu – Everything Everywhere All at Once as Joy Wang / Jobu Tupaki; Jean Smart – Babylon as Elinor St. John
Best Screenplay: Martin McDonagh – The Banshees of Inisherin; Todd Field – Tár; Rian Johnson – Glass Onion: A Knives Out Mystery; Ruben Östlund – Triangle of Sadness; Dana Stevens and Maria Bello – The Woman King

=== Television ===
Best Drama Series: Mystery Road: Origin; Heartbreak High; Severance; Stranger Things; The Bear	Best Comedy Series: The White Lotus: Sicily; Hacks; Only Murders in the Building; The Marvelous Mrs. Maisel; Wednesday
Best Actor in a Series: Mark Coles Smith – Mystery Road: Origin as Jay Swan; Jeremy Allen White – The Bear as Carmen "Carmy" Berzatto; Jason Bateman – Ozark as Marty Byrde; Bob Odenkirk – Better Call Saul as Jimmy McGill / Saul Goodman / Gene Takavic; Thomas Weatherall – Heartbreak High as Malakai Mitchell	Best Actress in a Series: Jennifer Coolidge – The White Lotus: Sicily as Tanya McQuoid-Hunt; Elizabeth Debicki – The Crown as Diana, Princess of Wales; Laura Linney – Ozark as Wendy Byrde; Jean Smart – Hacks as Deborah Vance; Zendaya – Euphoria as Rue Bennett
