= Online Film Critics Society Awards 2022 =

26th Online Film Critics Society Awards

26th Online Film Critics Society Awards
- Date: January 23, 2023

Highlights
- Best Picture: Everything Everywhere All at Once
- Most awards: Everything Everywhere All at Once (6)
- Most nominations: Everything Everywhere All at Once (11)

The 26th Online Film Critics Society Awards, honoring the best in film for 2022, were announced on January 23, 2023. The nominations were announced on January 18, 2023.

Everything Everywhere All at Once led the nominations with eleven, including Best Picture, followed by The Banshees of Inisherin with nine; the former won six awards, including Best Picture.

== Winners and nominees ==
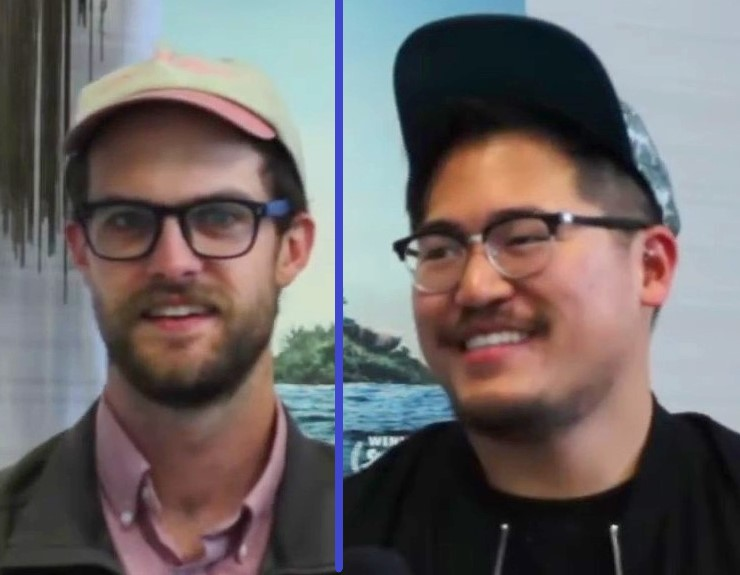
Daniel Scheinert and Daniel Kwan, Best Director winners

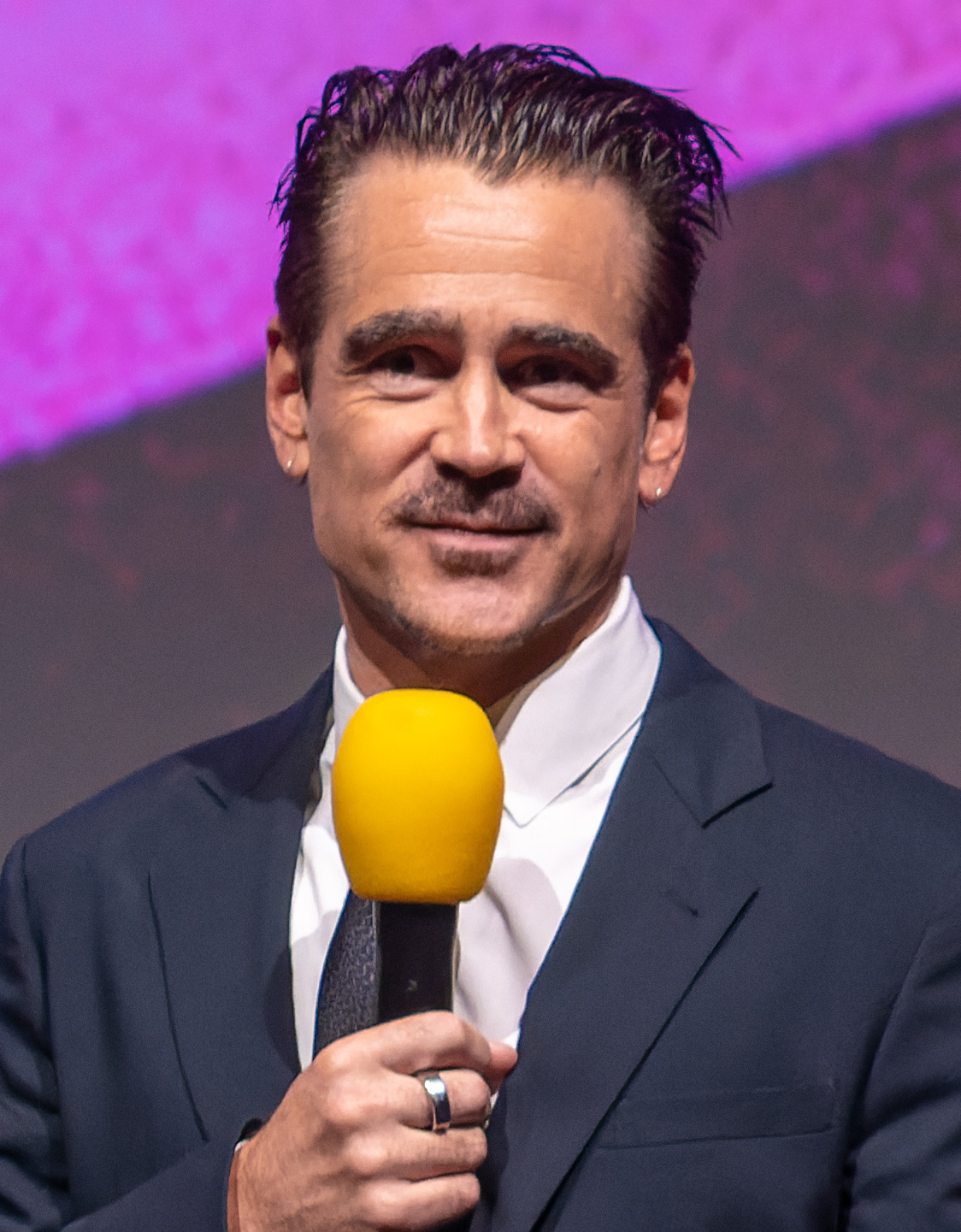
Colin Farrell, Best Actor winner

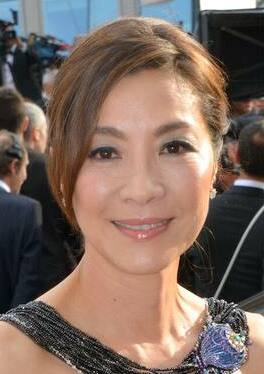
Michelle Yeoh, Best Actress winner

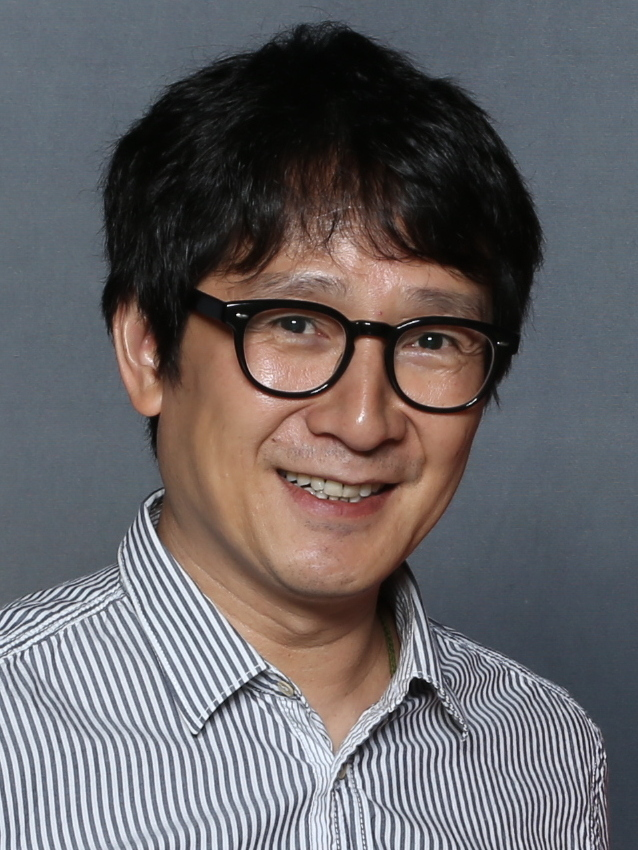
Ke Huy Quan, Best Supporting Actor winner

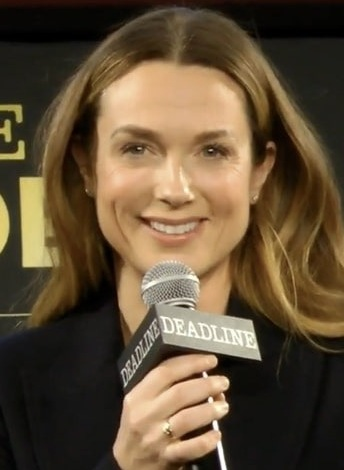
Kerry Condon, Best Supporting Actress winner

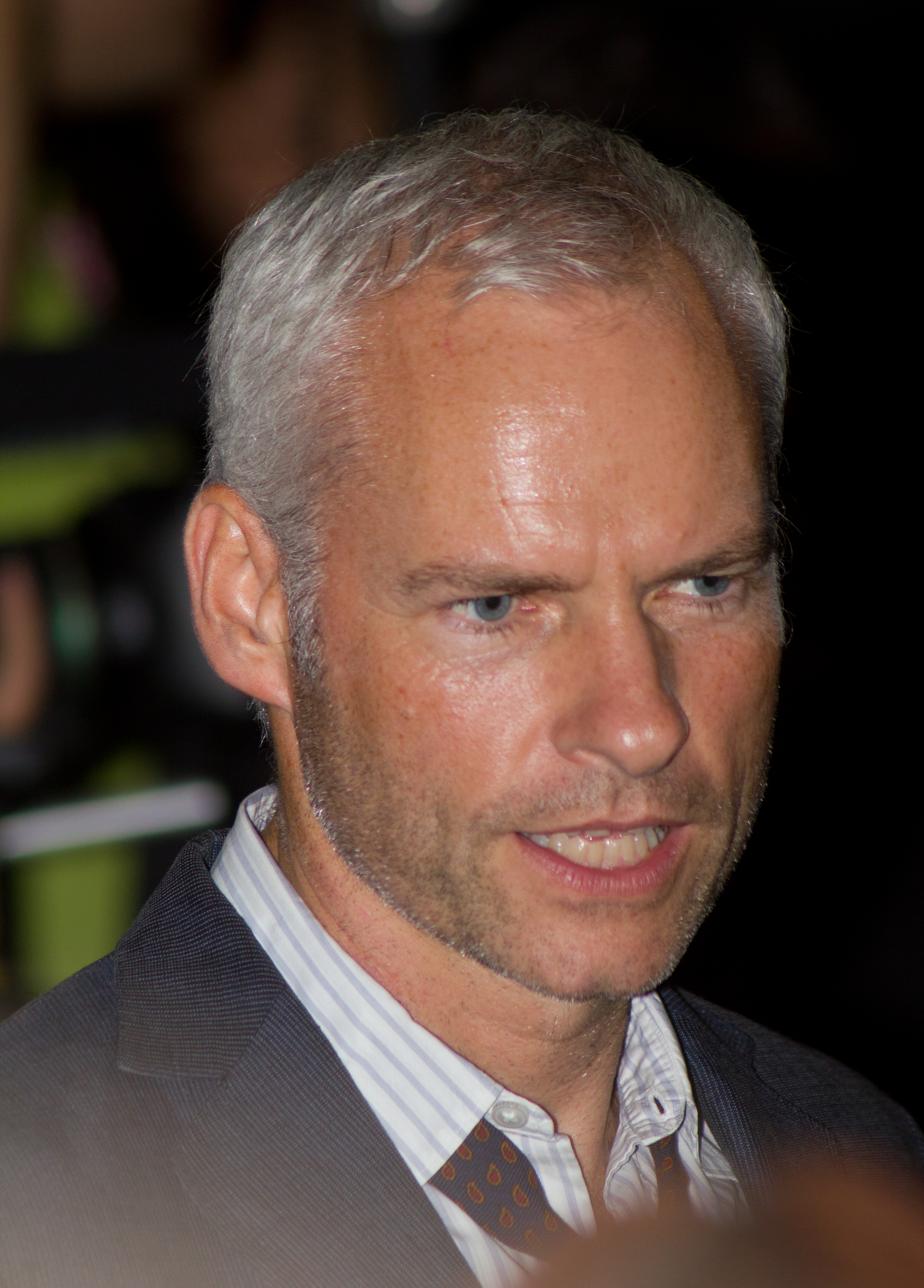
Martin McDonagh, Best Original Screenplay winner

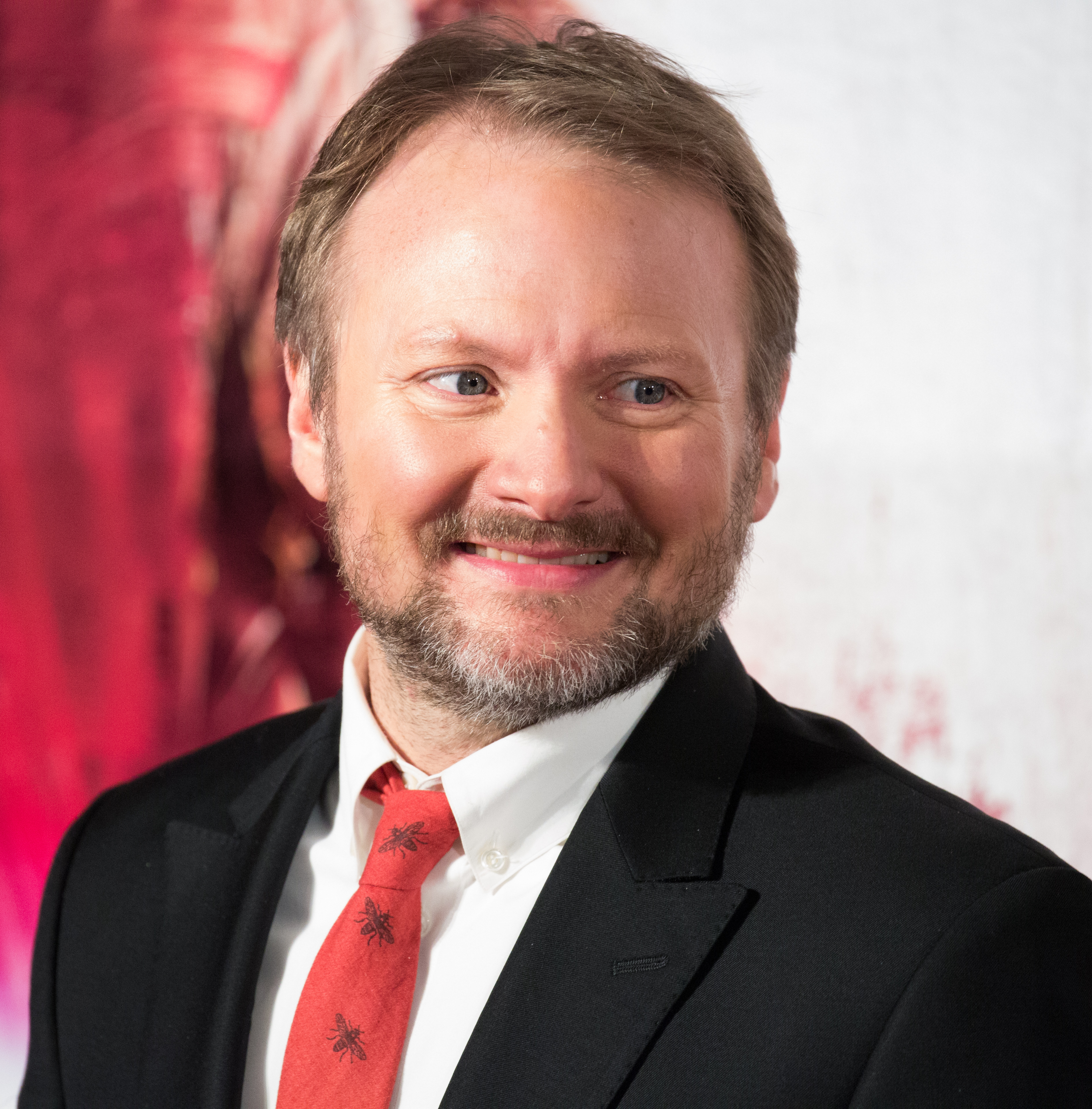
Rian Johnson, Best Adapted Screenplay winner

Best Picture	Best Director
1. Everything Everywhere All at Once; 2. The Banshees of Inisherin; 3. Tár; 4. The Fabelmans; 5. Nope; 6. RRR; 7. Top Gun: Maverick; 8. Aftersun; 9. Women Talking; 10. EO	Daniel Kwan and Daniel Scheinert – Everything Everywhere All at Once; Todd Field – Tár; Martin McDonagh – The Banshees of Inisherin; Steven Spielberg – The Fabelmans; Charlotte Wells – Aftersun
Best Actor	Best Actress
Colin Farrell – The Banshees of Inisherin as Pádraic Súilleabháin; Austin Butler – Elvis as Elvis Presley; Brendan Fraser – The Whale as Charlie; Paul Mescal – Aftersun as Calum Paterson; Bill Nighy – Living as Mr. Williams	Michelle Yeoh – Everything Everywhere All at Once as Evelyn Quan Wang; Cate Blanchett – Tár as Lydia Tár; Viola Davis – The Woman King as General Nanisca; Danielle Deadwyler – Till as Mamie Till-Mobley; Mia Goth – Pearl as Pearl
Best Supporting Actor	Best Supporting Actress
Ke Huy Quan – Everything Everywhere All at Once as Waymond Wang; Paul Dano – The Fabelmans as Burt Fabelman; Brendan Gleeson – The Banshees of Inisherin as Colm Doherty; Brian Tyree Henry – Causeway as James Aucoin; Barry Keoghan – The Banshees of Inisherin as Dominic Kearney	Kerry Condon – The Banshees of Inisherin as Siobhán Súilleabháin; Angela Bassett – Black Panther: Wakanda Forever as Queen Ramonda; Jamie Lee Curtis – Everything Everywhere All at Once as Deirdre Beaubeirdre; Dolly de Leon – Triangle of Sadness as Abigail; Stephanie Hsu – Everything Everywhere All at Once as Joy Wang / Jobu Tupaki
Best Animated Feature	Best Film Not in the English Language
Guillermo del Toro's Pinocchio; Apollo 10 1/2: A Space Age Childhood; Marcel the Shell with Shoes On; Puss in Boots: The Last Wish; Turning Red	Decision to Leave (South Korea); All Quiet on the Western Front (Germany); EO (Poland); No Bears (Iran); RRR (India)
Best Documentary	Best Debut Feature
Fire of Love; All That Breathes; All the Beauty and the Bloodshed; Good Night Oppy; Moonage Daydream	Charlotte Wells – Aftersun; Alice Diop – Saint Omer; John Patton Ford – Emily the Criminal; Owen Kline – Funny Pages; Panah Panahi – Hit the Road; Domee Shi – Turning Red
Best Original Screenplay	Best Adapted Screenplay
Martin McDonagh – The Banshees of Inisherin; Todd Field – Tár; Tony Kushner and Steven Spielberg – The Fabelmans; Daniel Kwan and Daniel Scheinert – Everything Everywhere All at Once; Jordan Peele – Nope	Rian Johnson – Glass Onion: A Knives Out Mystery; Noah Baumbach – White Noise; Guillermo del Toro, Patrick McHale, and Matthew Robbins – Guillermo del Toro's Pinocchio; Rebecca Lenkiewicz – She Said; Sarah Polley – Women Talking
Best Cinematography	Best Editing
Claudio Miranda – Top Gun: Maverick; Ben Davis – The Banshees of Inisherin; Florian Hoffmeister – Tár; Janusz Kamiński – The Fabelmans; Hoyte van Hoytema – Nope	Paul Rogers – Everything Everywhere All at Once; Eddie Hamilton – Top Gun: Maverick; Michael Kahn and Sarah Broshar – The Fabelmans; Matt Villa and Jonathan Redmond – Elvis; Monika Willi – Tár
Best Costume Design	Best Production Design
Black Panther: Wakanda Forever; Babylon; Elvis; Everything Everywhere All at Once; The Woman King	Everything Everywhere All at Once; Avatar: The Way of Water; Babylon; Elvis; The Fabelmans
Best Original Score	Best Visual Effects
Carter Burwell – The Banshees of Inisherin; Michael Giacchino – The Batman; Hildur Guðnadóttir – Women Talking; Justin Hurwitz – Babylon; John Williams – The Fabelmans	Avatar: The Way of Water; Everything Everywhere All at Once; Nope; RRR; Top Gun: Maverick

== Special awards ==
=== Technical Achievement Awards ===
- Avatar: The Way of Water – 3D Effects Design
- RRR – Original Song: "Naatu Naatu"
- RRR – Stunt Coordination
- Tár – Sound Design
- Top Gun: Maverick – Stunt Coordination

=== Lifetime Achievement Awards ===
- Ruth E. Carter, costume designer
- Claire Denis, director
- Pam Grier, actor
- Barbara Kopple, documentarian
- Bruce Willis, actor

=== Special Achievement Awards ===
- Maya Cade and the Black Film Archive
- The Academy of Motion Picture Arts and Sciences Museum – for providing a site where all aspects of cinema can be displayed
- Geena Davis – actor, producer, Oscar and Golden Globe winner, founder of the Geena Davis Institute on Gender in Media and winner of the Jean Hersholt Humanitarian Award

=== Non-U.S. Releases ===
- Continental Drift (South) (Switzerland)
- Everybody Loves Jeanne (France)
- Kímmapiiyipitssini: The Meaning of Empathy (Canada)
- Love Life (Japan)
- Lullaby (Spain)
- Met Mes (Netherlands)
- My Grandfather's Demons (Portugal)
- My Small Land (Japan)
- Paris Memories (France)
- Run Woman Run (Canada)

== Films with multiple nominations and awards ==
Films that received multiple nominations
Nominations	Film
11	Everything Everywhere All at Once
9	The Banshees of Inisherin
8	The Fabelmans
6	Tár
4	Aftersun
4	Elvis
4	Nope
4	Top Gun: Maverick
3	Avatar: The Way of Water
3	Babylon
3	RRR
3	Women Talking
2	Black Panther: Wakanda Forever
2	EO
2	Turning Red
2	The Woman King

Films that received multiple awards
Awards	Film
6	Everything Everywhere All at Once
4	The Banshees of Inisherin
2	Avatar: The Way of Water
2	RRR
2	Top Gun: Maverick
