= San Francisco Bay Area Film Critics Circle Awards 2022 =

21st San Francisco Bay Area Film Critics Circle Awards

21st SFBAFCC Awards

January 9, 2023

Best Picture:
The Banshees of Inisherin

Best Animated Feature:
Guillermo del Toro's Pinocchio

Best Documentary Feature:
All That Breathes

Best International Feature Film:
Decision to Leave

The 21st San Francisco Bay Area Film Critics Circle Awards, honoring the best in film for 2022, were given on January 9, 2023. The nominations were announced on January 6, 2023, with The Banshees of Inisherin leading the nominations with eleven. The film won Best Picture, though Tár received the most awards, with four wins, including Best Director (Todd Field) and Best Actress (Cate Blanchett).

== Winners and nominees ==
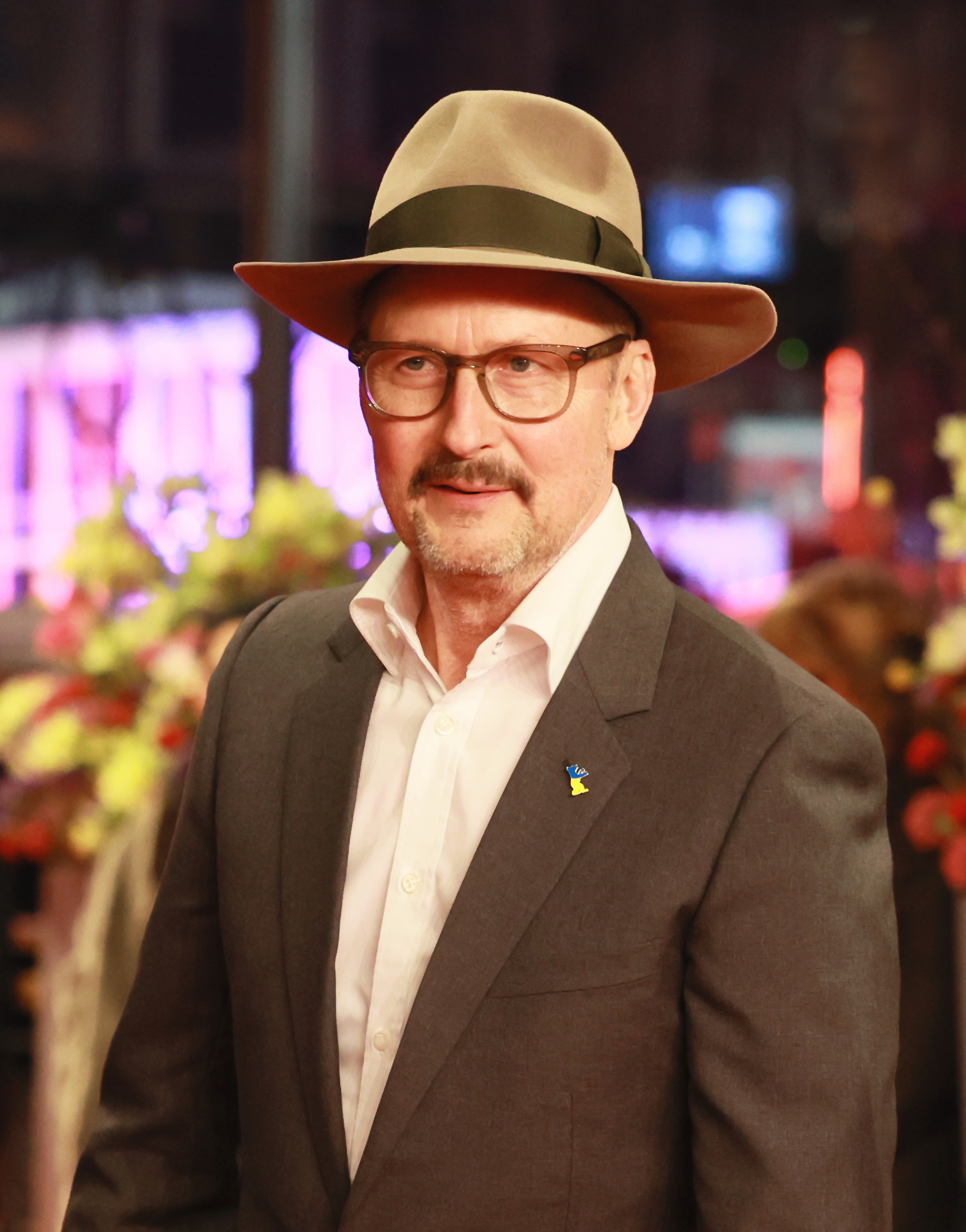
Todd Field, Best Director and Best Original Screenplay winner

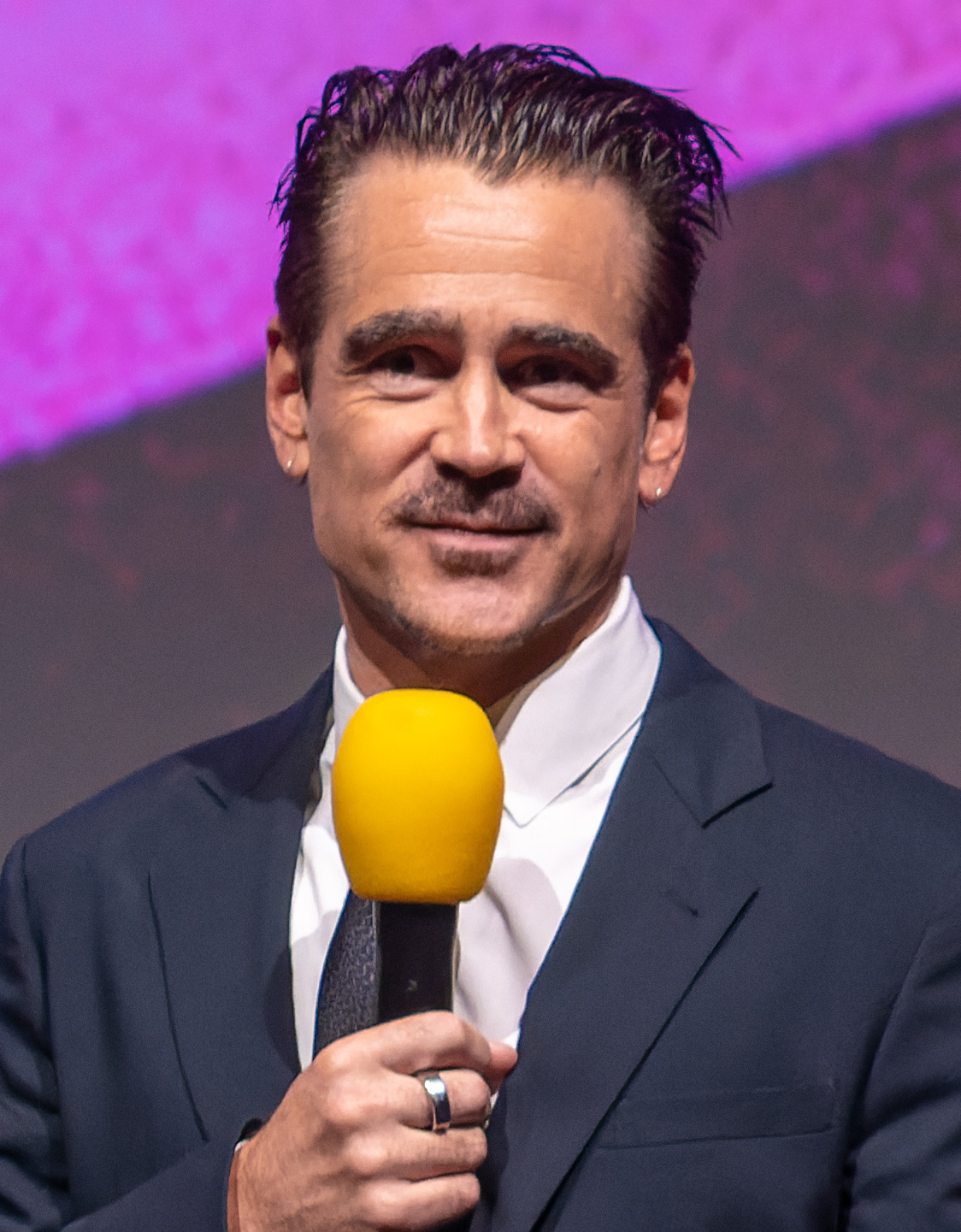
Colin Farrell, Best Actor winner

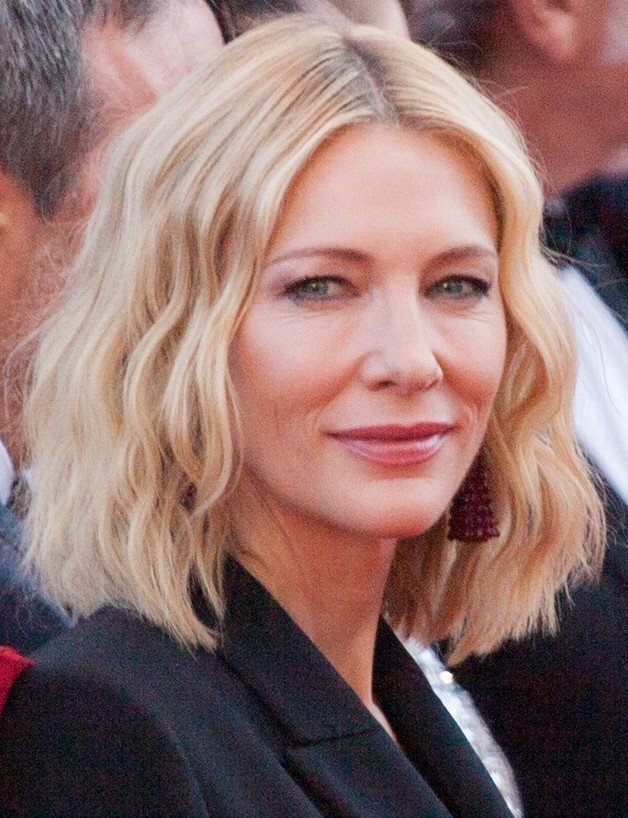
Cate Blanchett, Best Actress winner

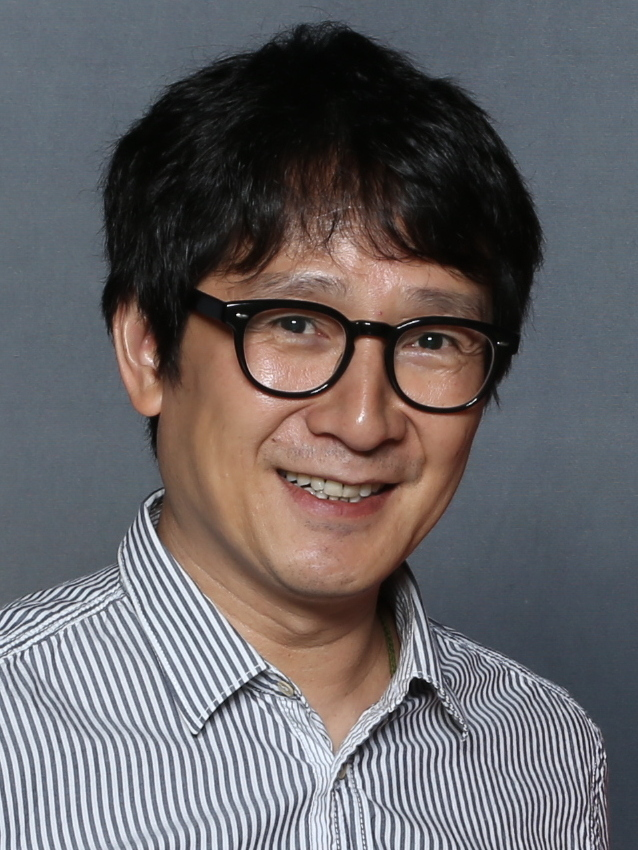
Ke Huy Quan, Best Supporting Actor winner

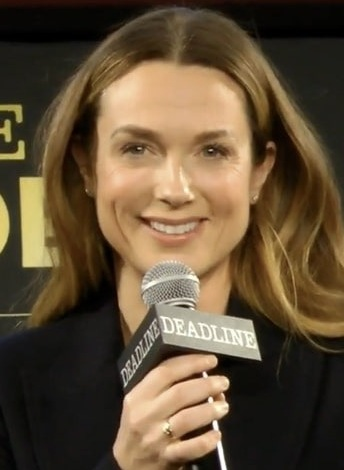
Kerry Condon, Best Supporting Actress co-winner

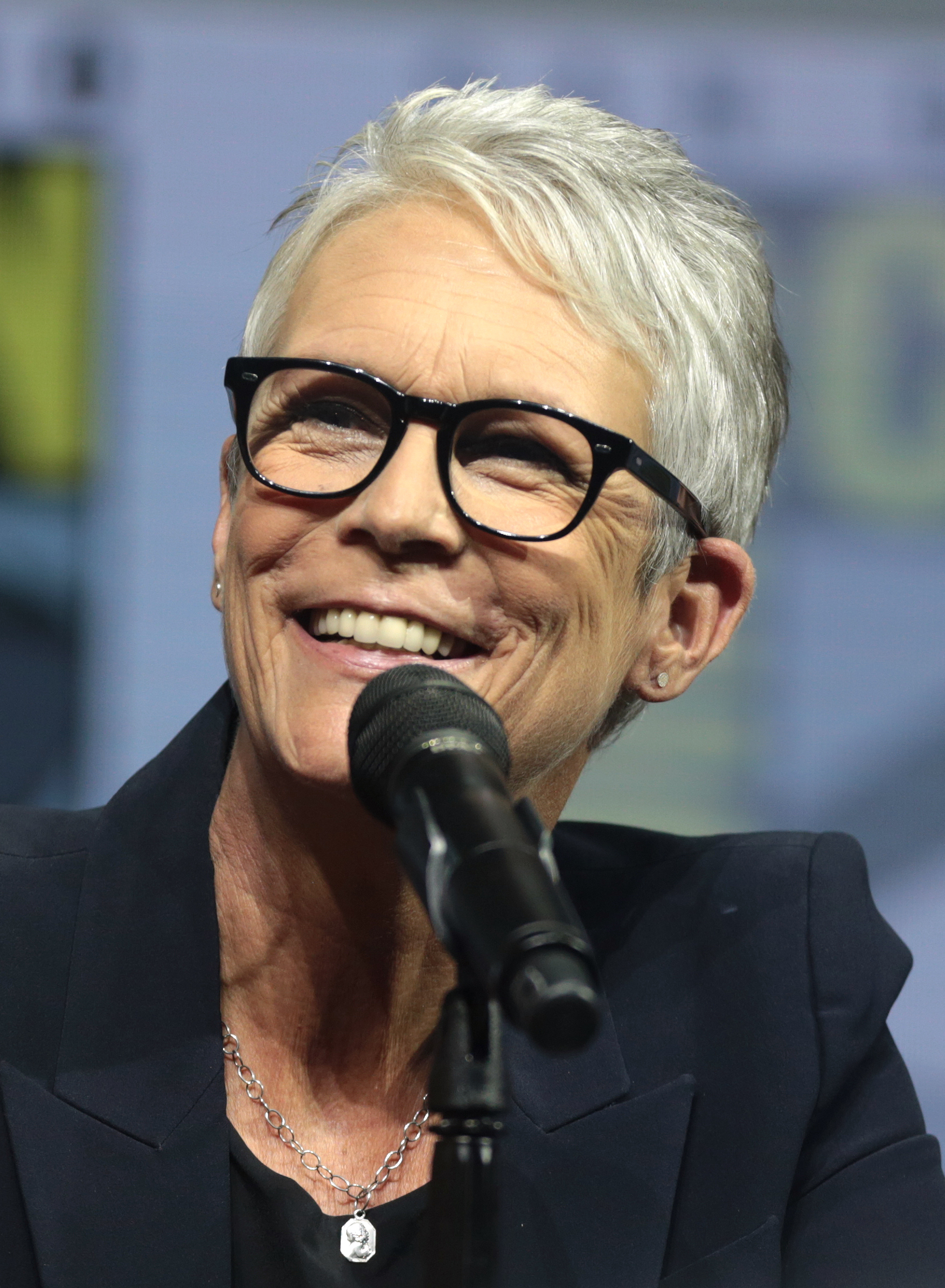
Jamie Lee Curtis, Best Supporting Actress co-winner

These are the nominees for the 21st SFFCC Awards. Winners are listed at the top of each list:

Best Picture	Best Director
The Banshees of Inisherin; Everything Everywhere All at Once (Honorable Mention); The Fabelmans; Tár; Women Talking	Todd Field – Tár; Daniel Kwan and Daniel Scheinert – Everything Everywhere All at Once; Martin McDonagh – The Banshees of Inisherin; Sarah Polley – Women Talking; Steven Spielberg – The Fabelmans; Charlotte Wells – Aftersun
Best Actor	Best Actress
Colin Farrell – The Banshees of Inisherin as Pádraic Súilleabháin; Austin Butler – Elvis as Elvis Presley; Brendan Fraser – The Whale as Charlie; Paul Mescal – Aftersun as Calum Paterson; Bill Nighy – Living as Mr. Williams	Cate Blanchett – Tár as Lydia Tár; Danielle Deadwyler – Till as Mamie Till-Mobley; Mia Goth – Pearl as Pearl; Aubrey Plaza – Emily the Criminal as Emily; Emma Thompson – Good Luck to You, Leo Grande as Nancy Stokes / Susan Robinson; Michelle Yeoh – Everything Everywhere All at Once as Evelyn Quan Wang
Best Supporting Actor	Best Supporting Actress
Ke Huy Quan – Everything Everywhere All at Once as Waymond Wang; Brendan Gleeson – The Banshees of Inisherin as Colm Doherty; Tom Hanks – Elvis as Colonel Tom Parker; Anthony Hopkins – Armageddon Time as Aaron Rabinowitz; Barry Keoghan – The Banshees of Inisherin as Dominic Kearney; Ben Whishaw – Women Talking as August	Kerry Condon – The Banshees of Inisherin as Siobhán Súilleabháin (TIE); Jamie Lee Curtis – Everything Everywhere All at Once as Deirdre Beaubeirdre (TIE); Angela Bassett – Black Panther: Wakanda Forever as Queen Ramonda; Dolly de Leon – Triangle of Sadness as Abigail; Claire Foy – Women Talking as Salome; Nina Hoss – Tár as Sharon Goodnow
Best Adapted Screenplay	Best Original Screenplay
Sarah Polley – Women Talking; Samuel D. Hunter – The Whale; Kazuo Ishiguro – Living; Rian Johnson – Glass Onion: A Knives Out Mystery; Rebecca Lenkiewicz – She Said	Todd Field – Tár; Daniel Kwan and Daniel Scheinert – Everything Everywhere All at Once; Tony Kushner and Steven Spielberg – The Fabelmans; Martin McDonagh – The Banshees of Inisherin; Charlotte Wells – Aftersun
Best Animated Feature	Best Documentary Feature
Guillermo del Toro's Pinocchio; Apollo 10 1/2: A Space Age Childhood; Marcel the Shell with Shoes On; Puss in Boots: The Last Wish; Turning Red	All That Breathes; All the Beauty and the Bloodshed; Bad Axe; Fire of Love; Good Night Oppy; Navalny
Best International Feature Film	Best Cinematography
Decision to Leave; All Quiet on the Western Front; Argentina, 1985; Close; EO	Florian Hoffmeister – Tár; Ben Davis – The Banshees of Inisherin; Kim Ji-yong – Decision to Leave; Janusz Kamiński – The Fabelmans; Claudio Miranda – Top Gun: Maverick; Linus Sandgren – Babylon
Best Film Editing	Best Original Score
Paul Rogers – Everything Everywhere All at Once; Tom Cross – Babylon; Eddie Hamilton – Top Gun: Maverick; Blair McClendon – Aftersun; Mikkel E. G. Nielsen – The Banshees of Inisherin; Monika Willi – Tár	Hildur Guðnadóttir – Women Talking; Carter Burwell – The Banshees of Inisherin; Alexandre Desplat – Guillermo del Toro's Pinocchio; Justin Hurwitz – Babylon; John Williams – The Fabelmans
Best Production Design
Jason Kisvarday and Kelsi Ephraim – Everything Everywhere All at Once; Hannah Beachler and Lisa K. Sessions – Black Panther: Wakanda Forever; Rick Heinrichs and Elli Griff – Glass Onion: A Knives Out Mystery; Florencia Martin and Anthony Carlino – Babylon; Mark Tildesley and Michael Standish – The Banshees of Inisherin

== Special awards ==
=== Special Citation for Independent Cinema ===
- Emergency
  - Servants
  - Topside

=== Marlon Riggs Award ===
- Phil Tippett
