= Kerry Condon =

Irish actress (born 1983)

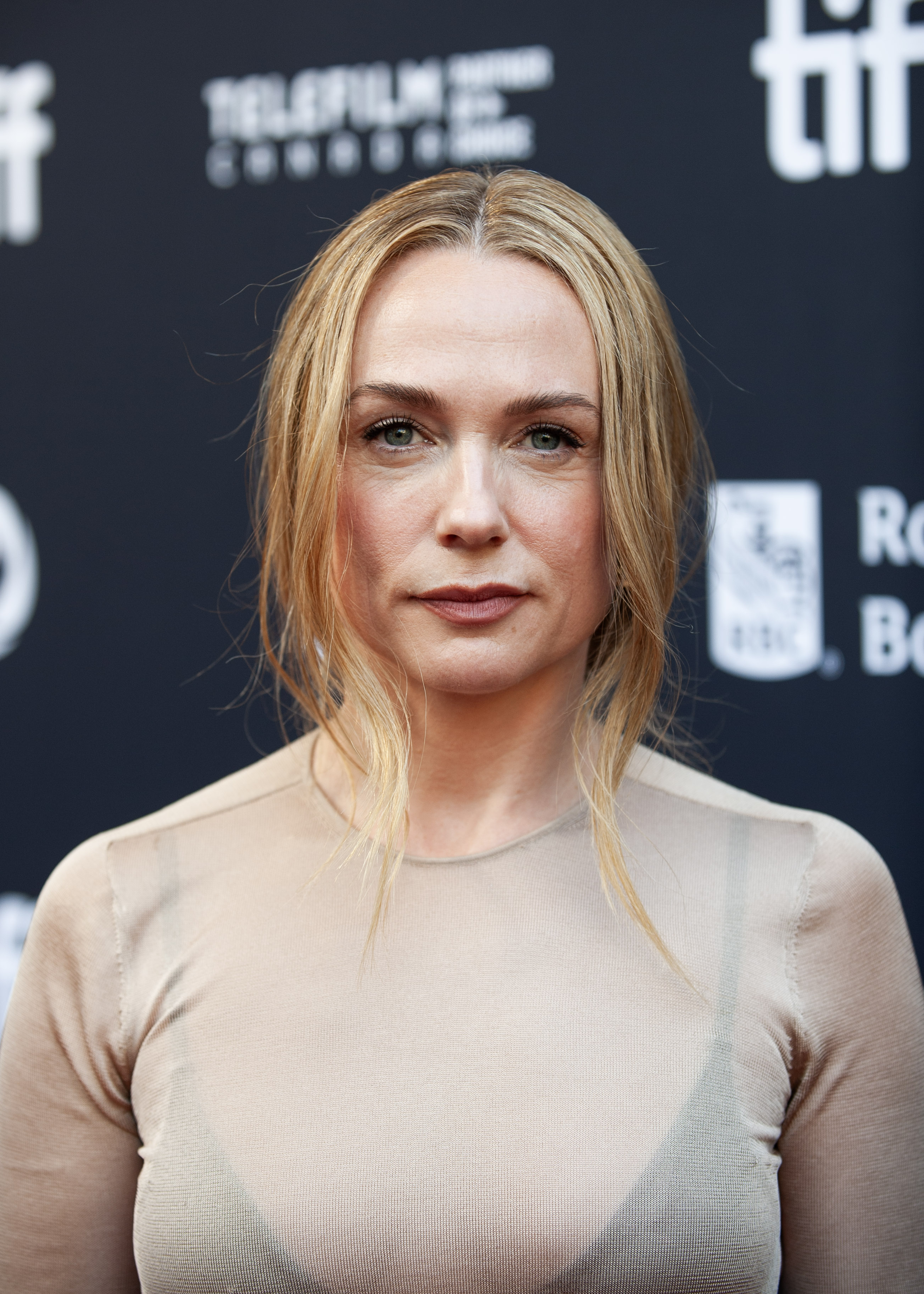
- Condon at the 2025 Toronto International Film Festival
- Born: 9 January 1983 (age 43); Thurles, County Tipperary, Ireland
- Occupation: Actress
- Years active: 1999–present

Kerry Condon (born 9 January 1983) is an Irish actress. She was the youngest actress to play Ophelia in a Royal Shakespeare Company production of Hamlet (2001–2002). She played Octavia of the Julii in Rome (2005–2007), Stacey Ehrmantraut in Better Call Saul (2015–2022), and is the voice of the artificial intelligence entity F.R.I.D.A.Y. in various films in the Marvel Cinematic Universe.

Condon has collaborated with Martin McDonagh in the plays The Lieutenant of Inishmore (2001) and The Cripple of Inishmaan (2009), as well as the films Three Billboards Outside Ebbing, Missouri (2017) and The Banshees of Inisherin (2022). For her performance in the last of these, she received several accolades, including the BAFTA Award for Best Actress in a Supporting Role, and was nominated for the Academy Award for Best Supporting Actress. She starred as technical director Kate McKenna in F1 (2025), and as Claire Thompson in Train Dreams (2025).

== Early life ==
Condon was born in Thurles, County Tipperary, Ireland, where she grew up alongside a younger brother. Her parents were in the business of breeding horses. She was interested in pursuing a career in acting from an early age, despite a teacher suggesting that she pursue accounting. At 10 years old, she wrote letters to agents in show business, and at 16, she landed a small role in Angela's Ashes.

== Career ==
In 2001 at the age of 18, Condon landed the role of Mairead in The Lieutenant of Inishmore by Martin McDonagh which she performed at the Royal Shakespeare Company and in 2006 at the Lyceum Theatre in New York. For the production she recorded the song "The Patriot Game" with The Pogues. That same year, Condon played the role of Ophelia in Hamlet, making her the youngest actress to ever play that role for the RSC. In 2009, she appeared in another play by Martin McDonagh, The Cripple of Inishmaan, for which she won a Lucille Lortel Award for Outstanding Featured Actress in a Play and a Drama Desk Award for Outstanding Ensemble Performance.

Condon's movie roles include Kate Kelly, Ned Kelly's outlaw sister, in 2003's Ned Kelly and an appearance in the 2003 Irish independent film Intermission with Cillian Murphy, Kelly Macdonald, and Colin Farrell. She was in the 2005 Jet Li action-thriller Unleashed. In 2005, Condon co-starred as Octavia of the Julii, sister of the Roman Emperor Augustus, in the HBO/BBC series Rome.

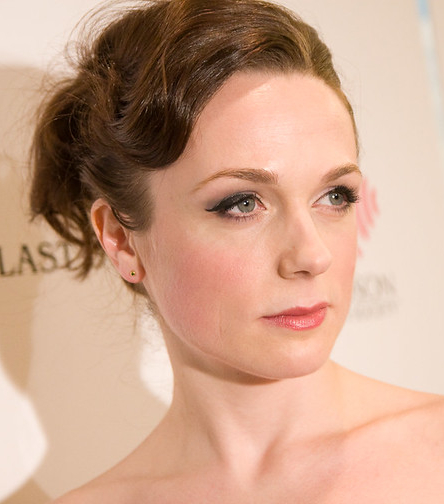
Condon in 2010

She then appeared as Masha, a Tolstoian, in The Last Station, a film about the last months of Leo Tolstoy's life, before playing jockey Rosie Shanahan in the 2012 TV series Luck. Condon appeared in the season 4 premiere of the post-apocalyptic zombie drama The Walking Dead playing the role of the character Clara, which aired 13 October 2013. She voiced the artificial intelligence F.R.I.D.A.Y., Iron Man's replacement for J.A.R.V.I.S. in the Marvel Studios films Avengers: Age of Ultron, Captain America: Civil War, Spider-Man: Homecoming, Avengers: Infinity War, and Avengers: Endgame.

After reuniting with Martin McDonagh in the 2017 film Three Billboards Outside Ebbing, Missouri, Condon played a major role in McDonagh's 2022 film The Banshees of Inisherin as the long-suffering sister of Colin Farrell's character. Condon's performance in the film earned her critical praise, garnering several accolades, including a win for the BAFTA Award for Best Actress in a Supporting Role and nominations for the Academy Award for Best Supporting Actress, the Golden Globe Award for Best Supporting Actress–Motion Picture and the Screen Actors Guild Award for Outstanding Performance by a Female Actor in a Supporting Role. In 2025, she starred as technical director Kate McKenna in the Formula One racing film F1.

== Filmography ==
=== Film ===
| Year | Title | Role | Notes |
|---|---|---|---|
| 1999 | Angela's Ashes | Theresa Carmody | |
| 2000 | Rat | Marietta | |
| 2001 | How Harry Became a Tree | Eileen | |
| 2003 | Ned Kelly | Kate Kelly | |
| 2003 | Intermission | Café Waitress | |
| 2005 | Unleashed | Victoria Mills | |
| 2009 | The Last Station | Masha | |
| 2011 | This Must Be the Place | Rachel | |
| 2011 | The Shore | Pat | Short film |
| 2013 | Dom Hemingway | Melody | |
| 2014 | Gold | Alice | |
| 2015 | Avengers: Age of Ultron | F.R.I.D.A.Y. (voice) | |
| 2016 | Captain America: Civil War | F.R.I.D.A.Y. (voice) | |
| 2017 | Spider-Man: Homecoming | F.R.I.D.A.Y. (voice) | |
| 2017 | Three Billboards Outside Ebbing, Missouri | Pamela | |
| 2018 | Bad Samaritan | Katie Hopgood | |
| 2018 | Avengers: Infinity War | F.R.I.D.A.Y. (voice) | |
| 2019 | Avengers: Endgame | F.R.I.D.A.Y. (voice) | |
| 2019 | Dreamland | Olivia Evans | |
| 2022 | The Banshees of Inisherin | Siobhán Súilleabháin | |
| 2023 | In the Land of Saints and Sinners | Doireann McCann | |
| 2024 | Night Swim | Eve Waller | |
| 2025 | Train Dreams | Claire Thompson | |
| 2025 | F1 | Kate McKenna | |
| 2026 | Pressure | Kay Summersby | |

=== Television ===
| Year | Title | Role | Notes |
|---|---|---|---|
| 1999 | Ballykissangel | Mairead Reilly | 2 episodes |
| 2004 | Born and Bred | Niamh Copper | Episode: "Something Old" |
| 2005–2007 | Rome | Octavia of the Julii | Main cast |
| 2008 | Anatomy of Hope | Jenna | TV movie, unsuccessful pilot |
| 2010 | Five Days | Sister Siobhan Doole | 3 episodes |
| 2011–2012 | Luck | Rosie Shanahan | Main cast |
| 2013–2014 | The Walking Dead | Clara | 4 episodes |
| 2014 | Believe | Dr. Zoe Boyle | Recurring role |
| 2015–2022 | Better Call Saul | Stacey Ehrmantraut | Recurring role; 18 episodes |
| 2016 | Brace for Impact | Sofia Gilchrist | TV movie |
| 2017 | Gypsy | Melissa Saugraves | Episode: "Black Barn" |
| 2018 | Women on the Verge | Laura | Main cast |
| 2019–2020 | Ray Donovan | Molly Sullivan | Recurring role (season 7); 9 episodes |
| 2022 | Ray Donovan: The Movie | Molly Sullivan | Television film |
| 2024–2025 | Star Wars: Skeleton Crew | Fara | 5 episodes |
| 2025 | Marvel Zombies | F.R.I.D.A.Y. (voice) | 1 episode |

=== Theme park attractions ===
| Year | Title | Role | Notes |
|---|---|---|---|
| 2022 | Avengers: Quantum Encounter | F.R.I.D.A.Y. (voice) | Disney Wish |

== Awards and nominations ==
| Award | Year | Category | Nominated work | Result | Ref. |
|---|---|---|---|---|---|
| AACTA International Awards | 2023 | Best Supporting Actress | The Banshees of Inisherin | Won | |
| Academy Awards | 2022 | Best Supporting Actress | The Banshees of Inisherin | Nominated | |
| Astra Midseason Awards | 2025 | Best Supporting Actress | F1 | Nominated | |
| Austin Film Critics Association Awards | 2023 | Best Supporting Actress | The Banshees of Inisherin | Nominated | |
| Austin Film Critics Association Awards | 2023 | Best Ensemble | The Banshees of Inisherin | Nominated | |
| BAFTA Awards | 2023 | Best Actress in a Supporting Role | The Banshees of Inisherin | Won | |
| Boston Online Film Critics Association Awards | 2022 | Best Supporting Actress | The Banshees of Inisherin | Won | |
| Boston Society of Film Critics Awards | 2022 | Best Supporting Actress | The Banshees of Inisherin | Won | |
| Chicago Film Critics Association Awards | 2022 | Best Supporting Actress | The Banshees of Inisherin | Won | |
| Chlotrudis Awards | 2023 | Best Supporting Actress | The Banshees of Inisherin | Won | |
| Critics' Choice Movie Awards | 2023 | Best Supporting Actress | The Banshees of Inisherin | Nominated | |
| Critics' Choice Movie Awards | 2023 | Best Acting Ensemble | The Banshees of Inisherin | Nominated | |
| Dallas–Fort Worth Film Critics Association Awards | 2022 | Best Supporting Actress | The Banshees of Inisherin | Won | |
| Drama Desk Awards | 2009 | Outstanding Ensemble Performance | The Cripple of Inishmaan | Won | |
| Dublin Film Critics' Circle Awards | 2022 | Best Actress | The Banshees of Inisherin | Nominated | |
| EDA Awards | 2023 | Best Supporting Actress | The Banshees of Inisherin | Won | |
| Florida Film Critics Circle Awards | 2022 | Best Supporting Actress | The Banshees of Inisherin | Nominated | |
| Florida Film Critics Circle Awards | 2022 | Best Ensemble | The Banshees of Inisherin | Nominated | |
| Georgia Film Critics Association Awards | 2023 | Best Supporting Actress | The Banshees of Inisherin | Nominated | |
| Georgia Film Critics Association Awards | 2023 | Best Ensemble | The Banshees of Inisherin | Nominated | |
| Golden Globe Awards | 2023 | Best Supporting Actress | The Banshees of Inisherin | Nominated | |
| Hollywood Critics Association Awards | 2023 | Best Supporting Actress | The Banshees of Inisherin | Nominated | |
| Houston Film Critics Society Awards | 2023 | Best Supporting Actress | The Banshees of Inisherin | Won | |
| Houston Film Critics Society Awards | 2023 | Best Ensemble Cast | The Banshees of Inisherin | Nominated | |
| IFTA Film & Drama Awards | 2011 | Best Actress in a Supporting Role in a Film | The Runway | Nominated | |
| IFTA Film & Drama Awards | 2015 | Best Actress in a Supporting Role in a Film | Gold | Nominated | |
| IFTA Film & Drama Awards | 2023 | Best Actress in a Supporting Role in a Film | The Banshees of Inisherin | Won | |
| IFTA Film & Drama Awards | 2026 | Best Actress in a Supporting Role in a Film | F1 | Won | |
| IFTA Film & Drama Awards | 2026 | Best Actress in a Supporting Role in a Film | Train Dreams | Nominated | |
| International Cinephile Society Awards | 2023 | Best Supporting Actress | The Banshees of Inisherin | Nominated | |
| International Cinephile Society Awards | 2023 | Best Ensemble | The Banshees of Inisherin | Nominated | |
| London Film Critics' Circle Awards | 2023 | Supporting Actress of the Year | The Banshees of Inisherin | Won | |
| Lucille Lortel Awards | 2009 | Outstanding Featured Actress in a Play | The Cripple of Inishmaan | Won | |
| National Society of Film Critics Awards | 2023 | Best Supporting Actress | The Banshees of Inisherin | Won | |
| Online Film Critics Society Awards | 2023 | Best Supporting Actress | The Banshees of Inisherin | Won | |
| San Diego Film Critics Society Awards | 2023 | Best Supporting Actress | The Banshees of Inisherin | Won | |
| San Diego Film Critics Society Awards | 2023 | Best Ensemble | The Banshees of Inisherin | Runner-up | |
| San Francisco Bay Area Film Critics Circle Awards | 2023 | Best Supporting Actress | The Banshees of Inisherin | Won | |
| Santa Barbara International Film Festival Awards | 2022 | Virtuoso Award | The Banshees of Inisherin | Won | |
| Satellite Awards | 2023 | Best Supporting Actress | The Banshees of Inisherin | Nominated | |
| Screen Actors Guild Awards | 2023 | Outstanding Performance by a Female Actor in a Supporting Role | The Banshees of Inisherin | Nominated | |
| Screen Actors Guild Awards | 2023 | Outstanding Performance by a Cast in a Motion Picture | The Banshees of Inisherin | Nominated | |
| Seattle Film Critics Society Awards | 2023 | Best Actress in a Supporting Role | The Banshees of Inisherin | Won | |
| Southeastern Film Critics Association Awards | 2022 | Best Supporting Actress | The Banshees of Inisherin | Won | |
| St. Louis Film Critics Association Awards | 2022 | Best Supporting Actress | The Banshees of Inisherin | Won | |
| St. Louis Film Critics Association Awards | 2022 | Best Ensemble | The Banshees of Inisherin | Nominated | |
| Vancouver Film Critics Circle Awards | 2023 | Best Supporting Actress | The Banshees of Inisherin | Nominated | |
| Washington D.C. Area Film Critics Association Awards | 2022 | Best Supporting Actress | The Banshees of Inisherin | Won | |
| Washington D.C. Area Film Critics Association Awards | 2022 | Best Acting Ensemble | The Banshees of Inisherin | Nominated | |

== See also ==
- List of Irish actors
- List of actors with Academy Award nominations
- List of Academy Award winners and nominees from Ireland
