= The Banshees of Inisherin =

2022 film by Martin McDonagh

- Theatrical release poster
- Directed by: Martin McDonagh
- Written by: Martin McDonagh
- Produced by: Graham Broadbent; Peter Czernin; Martin McDonagh
- Starring: Colin Farrell; Brendan Gleeson; Kerry Condon; Barry Keoghan
- Cinematography: Ben Davis
- Edited by: Mikkel E. G. Nielsen
- Music by: Carter Burwell
- Production companies: Blueprint Pictures; Film4
- Distributed by: Searchlight Pictures
- Release dates: 5 September 2022 (Venice); 21 October 2022 (United Kingdom and United States)
- Running time: 114 minutes
- Countries: United Kingdom; United States
- Language: English
- Budget: $20 million
- Box office: $52.3 million

The Banshees of Inisherin (/ˌɪnɪˈʃɛrɪn/ in-ih-SHERR-in) is a 2022 black tragicomedy film directed, written, and co-produced by Martin McDonagh. Set on a fictional remote island off the west coast of Ireland in 1923, (Note: There is an actual island called Inisheer located off the west coast of Ireland.) the film stars Colin Farrell and Brendan Gleeson as two lifelong friends who find themselves at an impasse when one abruptly ends their friendship, with severe consequences for both of them. Kerry Condon and Barry Keoghan co-star. It reunites Farrell and Gleeson after McDonagh's directorial debut In Bruges (2008).

The film had its world premiere on 5 September 2022 at the 79th Venice International Film Festival, where Farrell won the Volpi Cup for Best Actor and McDonagh won Best Screenplay. It was theatrically released in Ireland, the United Kingdom, and the United States on 21 October 2022 by Searchlight Pictures. The film received largely positive reviews, with particular praise for McDonagh's direction and screenplay, the performances of the cast, and Carter Burwell's score. It grossed $52 million worldwide against a $20 million budget.

The Banshees of Inisherin received nine nominations at the 95th Academy Awards, including Best Picture and Best Director. At the 80th Golden Globe Awards, it won three awards: Best Motion Picture – Musical or Comedy, Best Actor – Musical or Comedy (Farrell), and Best Screenplay. It also won four BAFTA Awards from ten nominations at the 76th British Academy Film Awards: Outstanding British Film, Best Actor in a Supporting Role (Keoghan), Best Actress in a Supporting Role (Condon), and Best Original Screenplay.

The film was also named one of the Top Ten Films of 2022 by the National Board of Review. It has since been cited as among the best films of the 2020s and the 21st century so far.

== Plot ==
In early April 1923, near the end of the Irish Civil War, on the fictional isle of Inisherin (lit. 'the island of Ireland'), fiddler Colm Doherty abruptly begins ignoring his lifelong best friend and drinking buddy Pádraic Súilleabháin. When a hurt Pádraic presses Colm for an explanation, he says that Pádraic is too dull, and he would rather spend the remainder of his life composing music and doing things for which he will be remembered. Pádraic is devastated and refuses to accept the situation, while Colm only becomes more resistant to his old friend's attempts to make amends, eventually giving Pádraic an ultimatum: every time Pádraic talks to him, Colm will cut off one of his own fingers.

The local Garda, Peadar Kearney, beats his troubled son Dominic severely for drinking his poitín, and Pádraic and his sister, Siobhán, take Dominic in for a night. While delivering milk to the market, Pádraic is insulted by Peadar and retaliates by making public the fact that Peadar abuses his son. Peadar punches him to the ground. Having witnessed this, Colm drives Pádraic home; the two do not speak.

Siobhán and Dominic try to defuse the pair's feud, to no avail. Pádraic drunkenly confronts Colm and berates him for throwing away their friendship, as well as for drinking with Peadar, whom he publicly accuses of molesting Dominic. After Siobhán leads Pádraic away, Colm says that this is the most interesting Pádraic has ever been, which Dominic overhears. The next morning, not remembering what he has said, Pádraic attempts to apologise to Colm, but the conversation goes badly. Colm responds by cutting off his left index finger and throwing it at Pádraic's door.

Pádraic later sees Colm meeting with Declan, a fiddler from the mainland. Jealous, Pádraic tricks Declan into returning home by lying that his father was hit by a bread van. As the tensions worsen, local elder Mrs McCormick warns Pádraic that death will come to the island soon. Dominic tells Pádraic what Colm said about him in the pub; encouraged, Pádraic tells Dominic what he did to Declan, but Dominic, disappointed, rejects him as mean and refuses to speak to him anymore. Thereafter, Siobhán sympathetically rejects Dominic's romantic advances.

Pádraic gets drunk and starts another confrontation with Colm at Colm's house; Colm says he has finished composing his song ("The Banshees of Inisherin") and seems finally open to renewing their friendship, but Pádraic drunkenly reveals what he did to Declan. Instead of meeting Pádraic at the pub, Colm cuts off all four of his remaining left fingers and throws them at Padraic's door.

Fed up by the feud and long bored with life on the island, Siobhán moves to the mainland for a job in a library. Devastated, Pádraic comes home to find his pet donkey Jenny has choked to death on one of Colm's fingers. He confronts Colm at the pub; Colm offers a truce, but an embittered Pádraic informs him that he will burn his house down the next day at 2 pm. At the promised time the next day, Pádraic does so; he looks in a window and sees Colm calmly sitting inside. Pádraic takes Colm's dog Sammy with him to save him from the fire. Peadar watches Pádraic burn down the house, and as he rushes to Pádraic's house to confront him, he encounters Mrs McCormick, who leads Peadar to Dominic's corpse in the lake. After returning home, Pádraic writes a letter to Siobhán that says Jenny is doing well and glosses over his lonely, friendless life.

The next morning, Pádraic takes Sammy back and finds Colm, who survived the fire, standing on the beach beside his burnt-out house. Colm apologises for the donkey's death and suggests destroying the house has ended their feud; Pádraic replies that it would have ended only if Colm had stayed inside. Colm wonders whether the Civil War is coming to an end; Pádraic replies he is sure the fighting will begin again soon because "some things there's no moving on from", adding that he thinks that is "a good thing" before turning to leave. Colm thanks him for looking after Sammy, and a suddenly emotional Pádraic responds "any time", before walking away. Unbeknownst to either, Mrs McCormick silently watches them from the remains of Colm's house.

== Cast ==
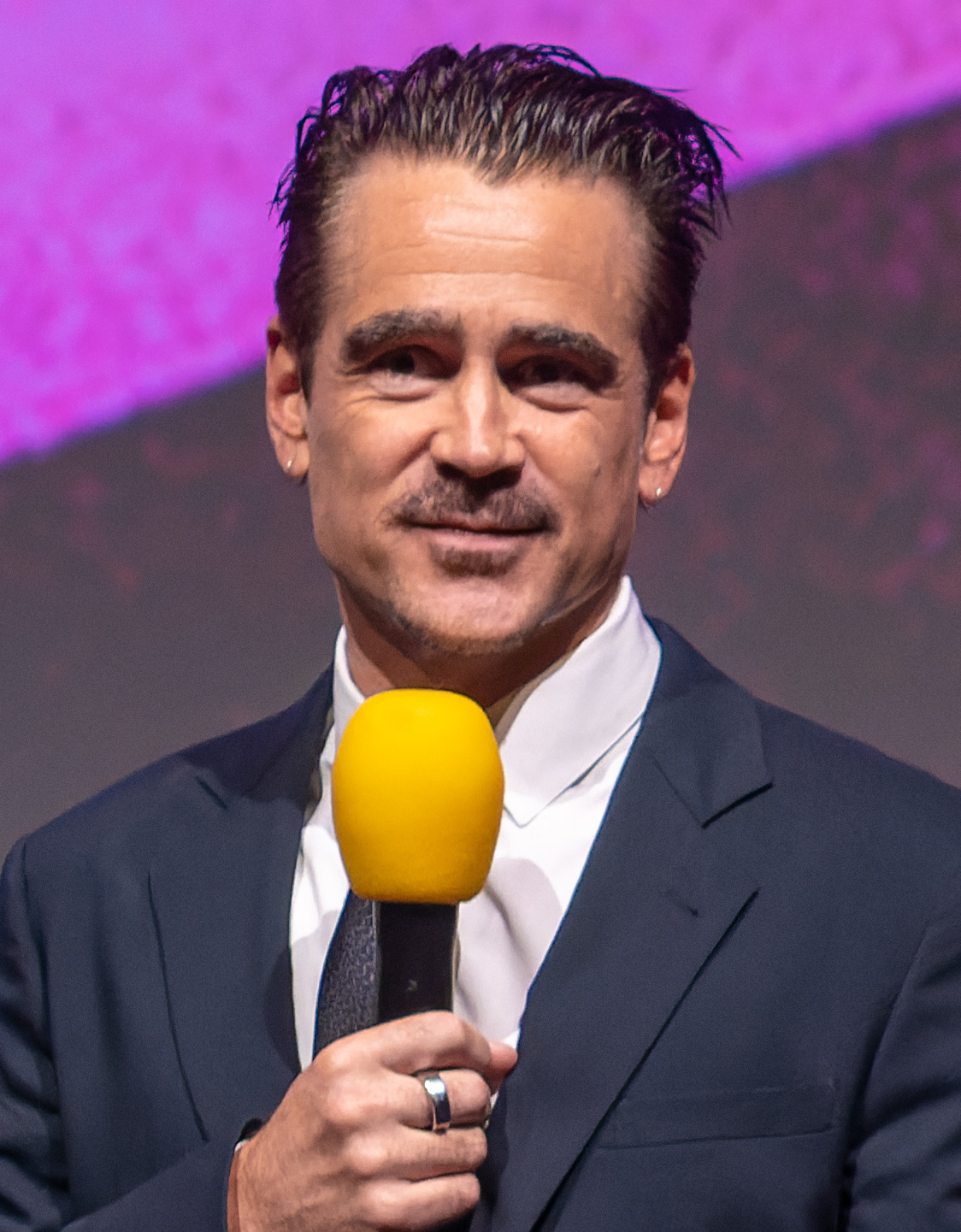
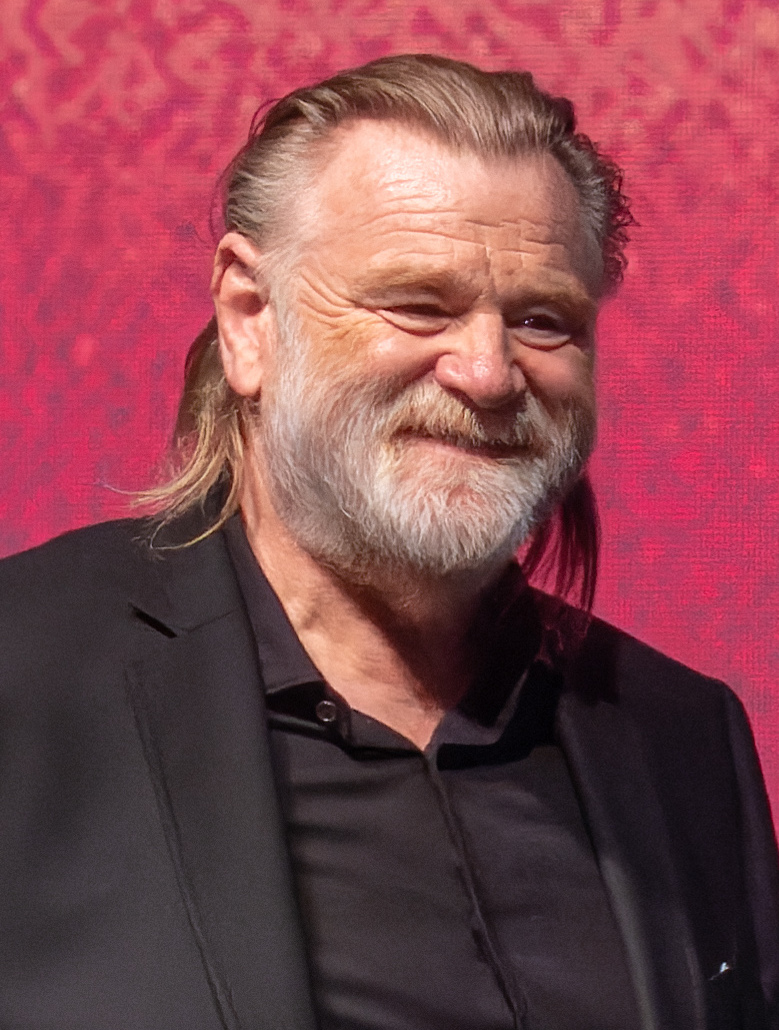
Colin Farrell (left) and Brendan Gleeson (right)
- Colin Farrell as Pádraic Súilleabháin
- Brendan Gleeson as Colm Doherty
- Kerry Condon as Siobhán Súilleabháin
- Barry Keoghan as Dominic Kearney
- Gary Lydon as Garda Peadar Kearney
- Pat Shortt as publican Jonjo Devine
- Sheila Flitton as Mrs McCormick
- Bríd Ní Neachtain as postmistress Mrs O'Riordan
- Jon Kenny as Gerry
- Aaron Monaghan as Declan
- David Pearse as priest
- Lasairfhíona Ní Chonaola as female singer
- John Carty as older musician 1

== Conception ==
The film is loosely based on McDonagh's unpublished and unproduced 1994 play The Banshees of Inisheer. The play was originally written as part of his Aran Island Trilogy, which also included the plays The Cripple of Inishmaan (1996) and The Lieutenant of Inishmore (2001). In a 2022 interview, McDonagh said, "In the back of my mind, I thought it would be great to wrap up that vague trilogy...even if the script is nothing like the one he wrote way back in 1994, during that initial blaze of inspiration". He added, "it's a made-up island", and said he wrote a new story for the film. The film's original title was The Banshees of Inisheer.

== Production ==
In February 2020, it was reported that Martin McDonagh had set his next directorial effort up with Searchlight Pictures, and that it would reunite him with his In Bruges stars Colin Farrell and Brendan Gleeson. In August 2021, Kerry Condon and Barry Keoghan were added to the cast.

Principal photography began in August 2021 on Inishmore (Inis Mór) before moving to Achill Island, County Mayo, later that month. Locations used on Achill include Cloughmore (JJ Devine's Pub), Corrymore Lake (Mrs McCormick's cottage), Keem Bay (Colm's house), Purteen Harbour (O'Riordan's shop), and St. Thomas's Church in Dugort. Filming wrapped on 23 October 2021.

Costume designer Eimer Ní Mhaoldomhnaigh discussed the pains she and her team took to make the wardrobe not feel like "a pastiche of the Aran Islands", which included using cloth that was entirely homespun and only using Irish wools, linens, and overdyed fabrics. For Pádraic's red jumper, Mhaoldomhnaigh envisioned what his sister, Siobhán, would have genuinely been motivated to make for him. "I can imagine Siobhán thinking, 'Oh my God, the winter's going to be very cold. I'm going to knit him a jumper,' then making the little collar as a kind of personal touch ... there's a beautiful naiveté to the way he dresses, but it's very tender as well, that idea that she adds this little touch to it. I think it says so much about him and his relationship with Siobhán, and his relationship with where he lives and his Irishness", Ní Mhaoldomhnaigh explained.

For Colm, Ní Mhaoldomhnaigh said: "There had to be something of the poet in the way he dressed, but without it being very ostentatious. So, he wears some corduroy that's nicely dyed and a saffron-colored linen shirt. There's that element of, not vanity, but a knowingness of somebody who has travelled to the outside world at some point and brought back ideas of what a poet or a musician should look like."

The donkey, Jenny, was designed by the film's creature-effects supervisor, Tahra Zafar.

== Music ==
The original score is by Carter Burwell, McDonagh's frequent collaborator. McDonagh did not want Burwell to compose an "Irish-based" score, despite the film's setting. For Pádraic's character, Burwell attempted "child-like" and "Disney character" music; he also used fiddle-themed compositions for Colm. The soundtrack was digitally released by Hollywood Records on 21 October 2022 along with the film.

The film also has traditional pub music session scenes with Irish music, in which traditional musicians join Gleeson, who plays the fiddle. The other musicians are John Carty (fiddle), his son James Carty (fiddle), Conor Connolly (accordion), Oliver Farrelly (accordion), and Ryan Owens (bodhrán). In one scene, Lasairfhíona Ní Chonaola sings the Irish song "I'm a Man You Don't Meet Every Day".

The film's opening scene is set to the traditional Bulgarian folk song "Polegnala e Todora (Love Song)", arranged by Filip Kutev and performed by the Bulgarian State Television Female Vocal Choir.

== Release ==
=== Theatrical ===
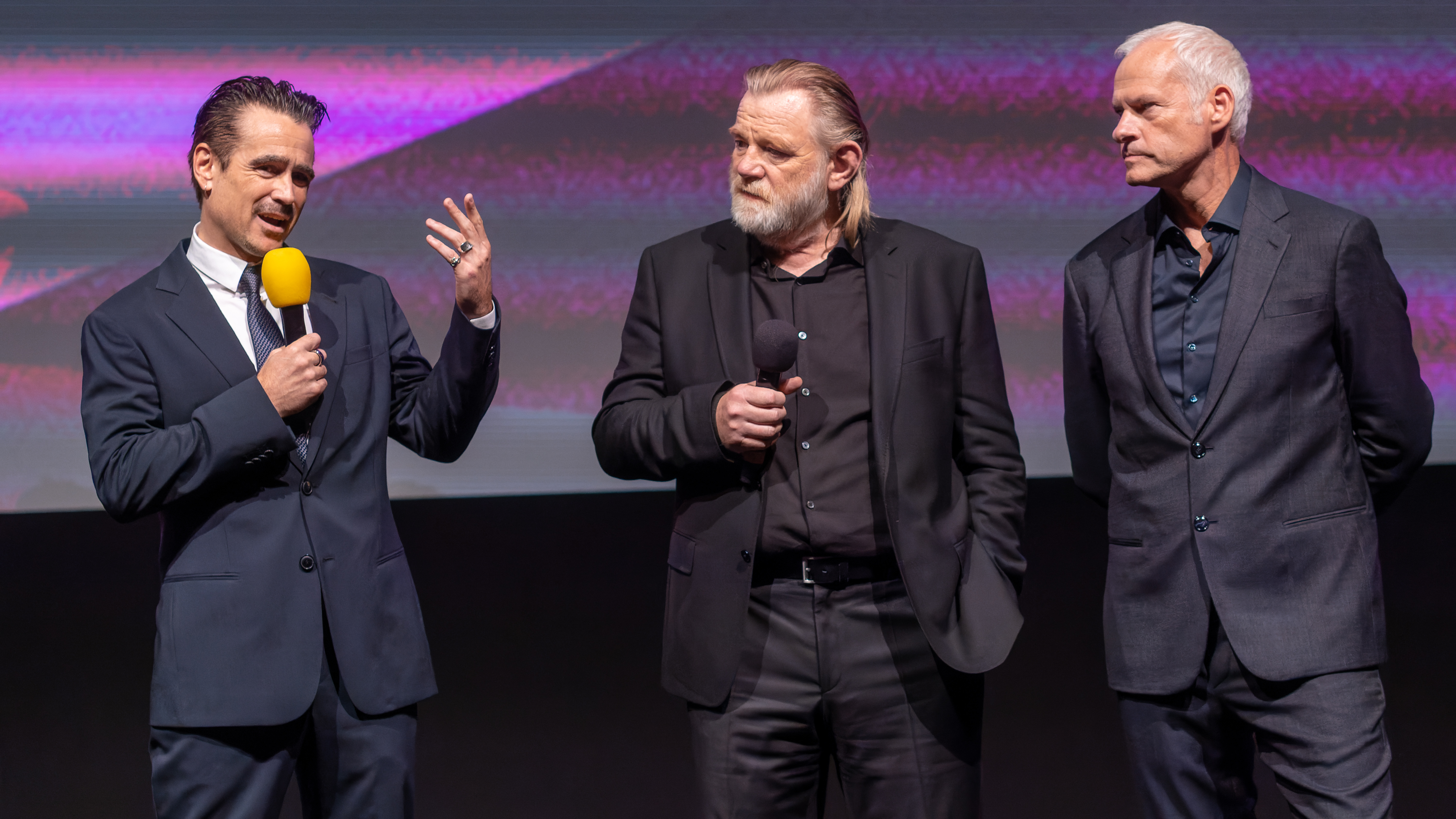
Colin Farrell, Brendan Gleeson, and Martin McDonagh at the premiere of the film at the 66th BFI London Film Festival

The Banshees of Inisherin had its world premiere on 5 September 2022 at the 79th Venice International Film Festival, where it received a 15-minute standing ovation from the audience, the longest of that year's festival. It also screened at the 47th Toronto International Film Festival that month and as the opening-night film of the 31st Philadelphia Film Festival on 19 October 2022. It was theatrically released on 21 October 2022.

The film returned to U.S. cinemas on 27 January 2023 to celebrate its Academy Award nominations.

=== Home media ===
The film was released on rental PVOD and made available to stream on HBO Max on 13 December 2022, and was released on Blu-ray and DVD on 20 December 2022 by 20th Century Home Entertainment and Disney / Buena Vista; bonus features include the featurette "Creating The Banshees of Inisherin" and deleted scenes.

The Banshees of Inisherin was released on Disney+ as part of the Star content hub in selected regions on 14 December 2022 and 21 December 2022 in the United Kingdom and Ireland. The film was also released on Disney+ Hotstar in India on 14 December 2022. It was made available to stream on Hulu on 4 September 2023.

== Reception ==
=== Box office ===
The Banshees of Inisherin grossed $10.5 million in the U.S. and Canada, and $41.7 million in other territories, for a worldwide total of $52.3 million.

In the film's opening weekend in the U.S. it made $184,454 from four theaters, for a per-venue average of $46,113, making it the second-highest grossing opener for a Fall 2022 platform release, behind Till. The next weekend the film expanded to 58 theaters, making $535,170. The following weekend it expanded to 895 theaters, making $2.1 million and finishing seventh at the box office. These moderate results were attributed to the increasing change in audience behavior to the detriment of prestige films in a moviegoing environment altered by the COVID-19 pandemic restrictions, where moviegoers refused to see and support such titles in favor of franchise and straightforward horror films. Upon its return to theaters during the weekend of 27 January 2023, following the Academy Award nomination announcements, it rose 383% domestically.

=== Critical response ===
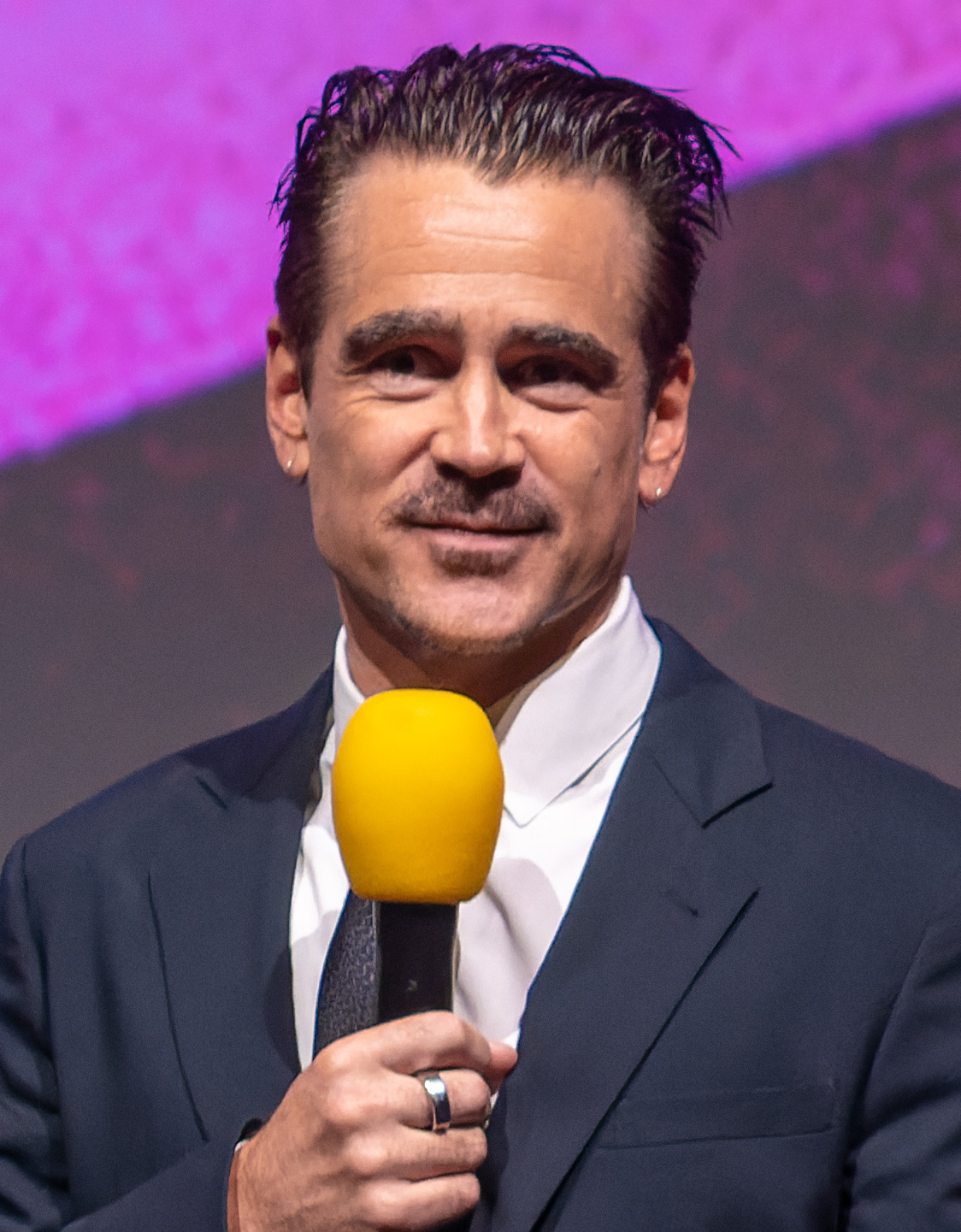
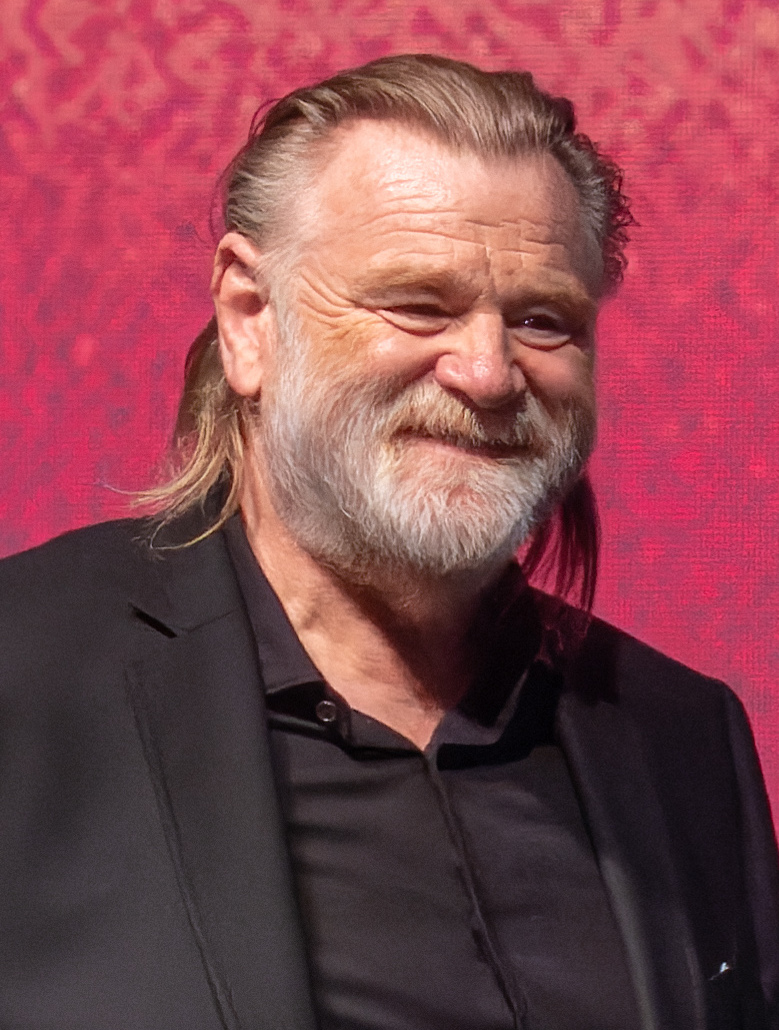
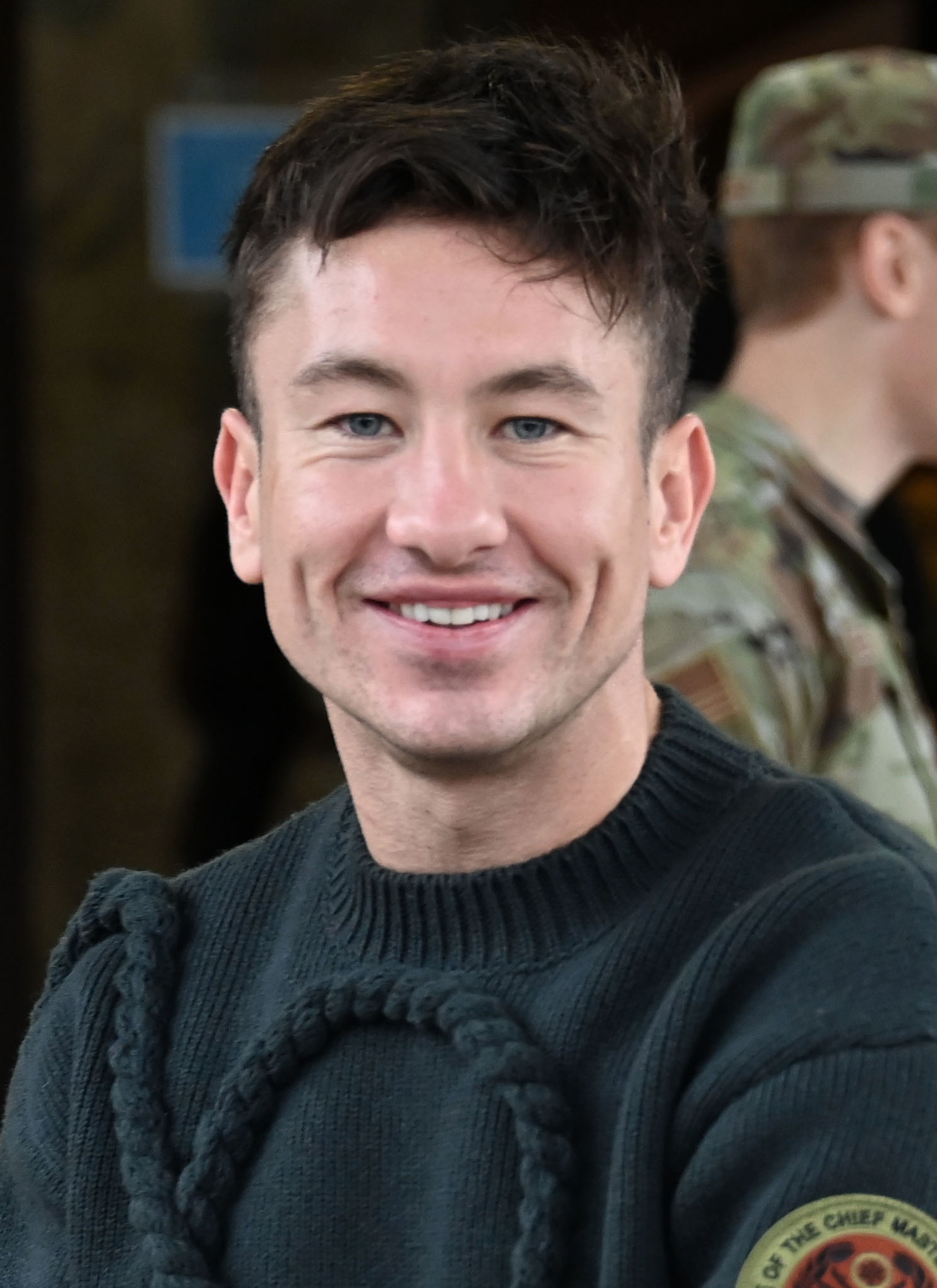
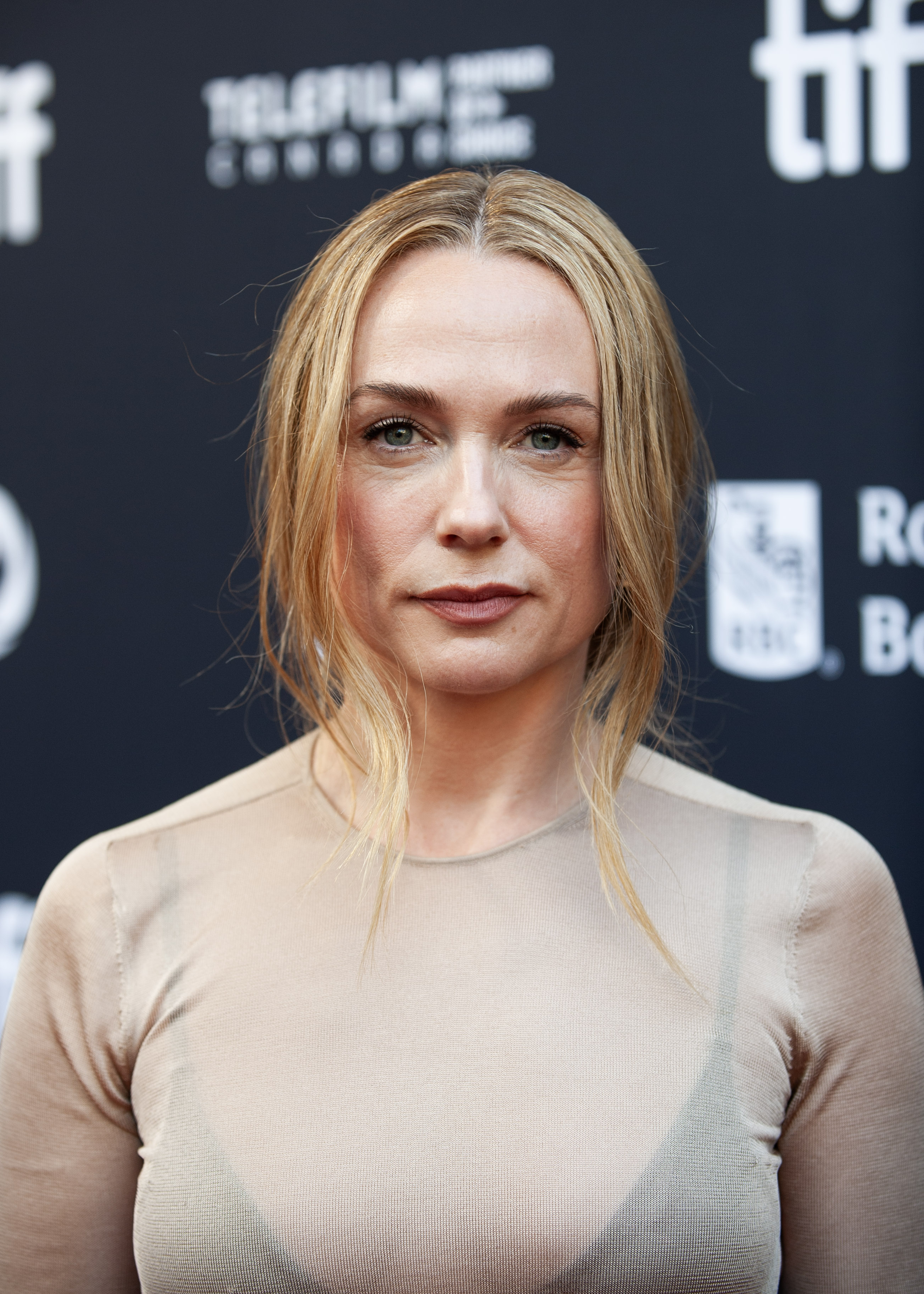
Colin Farrell, Brendan Gleeson, Barry Keoghan, and Kerry Condon garnered critical acclaim for their performances and earned Academy Award nominations for Best Actor, Best Supporting Actor, and Best Supporting Actress.

On the review aggregator website Rotten Tomatoes, 96% of 376 critics' reviews are positive. The website's consensus reads: "Featuring some of Martin McDonagh's finest work and a pair of outstanding lead performances, The Banshees of Inisherin is a finely crafted feel-bad treat." Metacritic, which uses a weighted average, assigned the film a score of 87 out of 100, based on 62 critics, indicating "universal acclaim".

Peter Bradshaw of The Guardian gave the film four out of five stars, writing that "as a study of male loneliness and swallowed anger it is weirdly compelling and often very funny". Todd McCarthy of Deadline Hollywood wrote that the film is "a simple and diabolical tale of a friendship's end shot through with bristling humor and sudden moments of startling violence". He praised Ben Davis's cinematography and Carter Burwell's score. David Ehrlich of IndieWire rated it B+, writing that "its constant undercurrent of humor affords the story's most pressing questions an appropriately ridiculous context, one that speaks to the absurdities of all existence". He also called it McDonagh's best work since In Bruges.

Matthew Creith of Screen Rant wrote that the film's "demonstration of the metaphorical aspects of civil disobedience and internal protest between a set of individuals is remarkably hilarious". The New York Times's Kyle Buchanan wrote: "The film was rapturously received here in Venice, earning a lengthy standing ovation and rave reviews". For Variety, Guy Lodge wrote: "What begins as a doleful, anecdotal narrative becomes something closer to mythic in its rage and resonance: McDonagh has long fixated on the most visceral, vengeful extremes of human behavior, but never has he formed something this sorely heartbroken from that fascination".

David Rooney of The Hollywood Reporter called the film "a ruminative ensemble piece that expertly balances the tragicomic with the macabre, inhabiting territory adjacent to McDonagh's stage work yet also sweepingly cinematic". Robbie Collin of The Telegraph awarded it 5/5 stars and called it "an often shoulder-shudderingly funny film, whose comic dialogue is dazzlingly designed and performed".

Conversely, Mark Feeney, writing for The Boston Globe, gave the film an unenthusiastic review, calling it "a short story trying to be a novel" and the metaphor for the Irish Civil War "awfully flat-footed". Multiple critics took issue with the film's portrayal of Ireland: Mark O'Connell of Slate criticized the film's characters' portrayal of "Irishness", writing: "It's worth noting, though maybe not surprising, that international critics have failed to take issue with its deployment of the hoariest Irish stereotypes". Ed Power of The Telegraph wrote that "underneath its Quiet Man curlicues, a much better movie strains for freedom" and was disappointed that McDonagh chose to "shroud his character study in hackneyed Paddy-isms". The Spectator's Joy Porter attacked the "insidious falsehood perpetuated by this film about [her] home country's history of partition and civil war", summarising it as a "beautifully staged but dangerously ahistorical and misleading film". John Waters, however, praised the film in his review for First Things for taking "the kitschified, cliched landscape of Ireland and [handing] it back to itself, cleansed ... Most Irish writers and artists simply run away from the tainted iconography, but McDonagh cleans it off and kisses it, redeeming it with a new meaning in which the irony is both present and transcended".

The film has appeared on a number of critics' lists of the best films of 2022, ranking first on many. (Note: Attributed to multiple references:)

=== Legacy ===
In April 2023, Screen Rant ranked The Banshees of Inisherin fourth on "The 10 Best Movies of the 2020s (So Far)", calling it "one of the great movies that can break the audience's heart while still making them laugh". In September 2023, Collider ranked it fourth on its list of "The 20 Best Drama Movies of the 2020s So Far", calling it "one of the greatest 'breakup' movies ever made" and adding that "in a decade where he has already given some great performances, Farrell does his best work ever; Pádraic's idealism fades as he realizes that there's no reward for being nice". The site also ranked it 15th on its list of the "50 Best Movies of the 2020s (So Far)".

IndieWire included The Banshees of Inisherin on its list of "The 48 Saddest Movies", with Alison Foreman writing: "Martin McDonagh movies are practically synonymous with tragicomic clashes of philosophy, particularly if they're punctuated by outbursts of over-the-top violence ... Still, riding on the wee legs of little Jenny the miniature donkey, The Banshees of Inisherin pulls far ahead in the race for McDonagh's outright saddest film when two old drinking partners suddenly go their separate ways". The site also ranked it #41 on its list of "The 92 Best Comedies of the 21st Century", with Christian Zilko writing that it "resonates because its premise is simply and painfully relatable. Anyone who's ever lost a friend, through their own fault or not, will be able to see themselves in the tale".

In August 2023, JJ Devine's Pub was reassembled with the help of Kilkerrin local and publican Luke Mee, becoming a tourist destination due to the film's familiarity and popularity in the area.

In July 2025, The Banshees of Inisherin ranked 123rd on the "Readers' Choice" edition of The New York Times's list of "The 100 Best Movies of the 21st Century".
