= List of accolades received by Everything Everywhere All at Once =

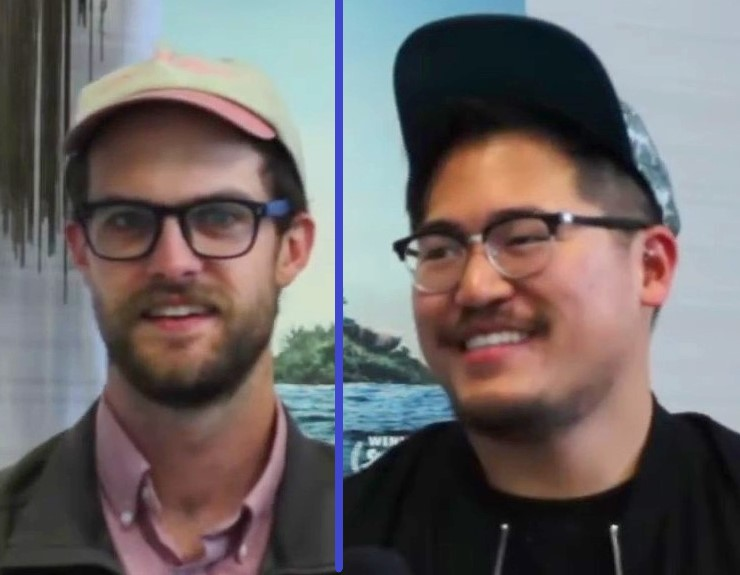
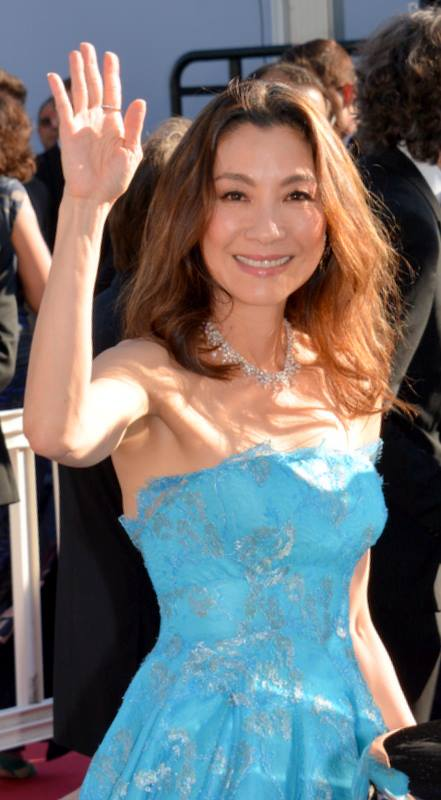
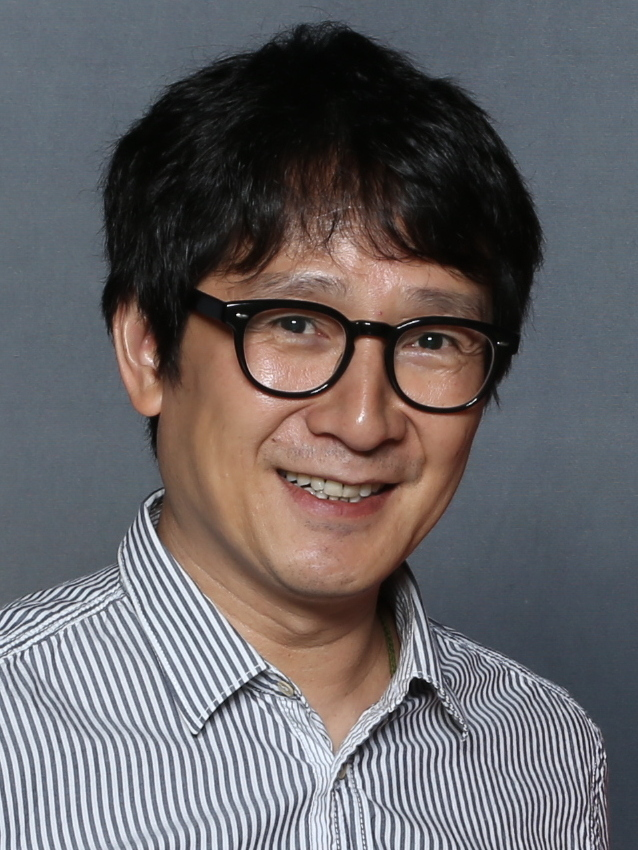
- Daniel Scheinert and Daniel Kwan (left) received critical acclaim for their screenplay and direction, as did Michelle Yeoh (middle) and Ke Huy Quan (right) for their performances.
Awards and nominations
Award	Wins	Nominations

Totals (Note: Certain award groups do not simply award one winner. They acknowledge several different recipients, have runners-up, and have third place. Since this is a specific recognition and is different from losing an award, runner-up mentions are considered wins in this award tally. For simplification and to avoid errors, each award in this list has been presumed to have had a prior nomination.)
- Wins: 343
- Nominations: 684

Numerous critical and industry groups have acclaimed Everything Everywhere All at Once, a 2022 American film written and directed by Daniel Kwan and Daniel Scheinert (collectively known as "Daniels"), who co-produced it with Jonathan Wang and Anthony and Joe Russo. The film garnered many awards and nominations in various categories with particular recognition for its directing, writing, producing, acting, and editing; it is currently estimated to be the most awarded film of all time.

At the 95th Academy Awards, Everything Everywhere All at Once received 11 nominations and won seven awards, topping all other movies that year. Several of its nominations made Oscar history: Michelle Yeoh became the first Asian woman nominated in the Best Actress category, (Note: Yeoh is the second Asian actress but first actress to identify with their Asian heritage to be nominated in the category, as past nominee Merle Oberon hid her Asian heritage throughout her career.) while Stephanie Hsu's nomination in the Best Supporting Actress category, alongside Hong Chau's nomination for The Whale, marked the first time two Asian actresses were nominated in that category in the same year. The film won Best Picture, Best Director, Best Actress for Yeoh, Best Supporting Actor for Ke Huy Quan, Best Supporting Actress for Jamie Lee Curtis, Best Original Screenplay, and Best Film Editing, becoming the first film to win six above-the-line Oscars. It was the third film to win three acting Oscars (after A Streetcar Named Desire (1951) and Network (1976)), and the first to also win Best Picture.

The National Board of Review and the American Film Institute named it a top-ten film of 2022. Yeoh and Quan received awards for their performances at the 80th Golden Globes. Quan also won Best Supporting Actor at the 28th Critics' Choice Awards.

== Accolades ==
Accolades received by Everything Everywhere All at Once
Award	Date of ceremony	Category	Recipient(s)	Result	Ref.
AACTA International Awards	February 24, 2023	Best Film	Everything Everywhere All at Once	Nominated	
AACTA International Awards	February 24, 2023	Best Direction	Daniel Kwan and Daniel Scheinert	Nominated	
AACTA International Awards	February 24, 2023	Best Actress	Michelle Yeoh	Nominated	
AACTA International Awards	February 24, 2023	Best Supporting Actor	Ke Huy Quan	Nominated	
AACTA International Awards	February 24, 2023	Best Supporting Actress	Jamie Lee Curtis	Nominated	
AACTA International Awards	February 24, 2023	Best Supporting Actress	Stephanie Hsu	Nominated	
AARP Movies for Grownups Awards	January 28, 2023	Best Movie for Grownups	Everything Everywhere All at Once	Nominated	
AARP Movies for Grownups Awards	January 28, 2023	Best Actress	Michelle Yeoh	Won	
AARP Movies for Grownups Awards	January 28, 2023	Best Supporting Actor	Ke Huy Quan	Nominated	
AARP Movies for Grownups Awards	January 28, 2023	Best Supporting Actress	Jamie Lee Curtis	Nominated	
AARP Movies for Grownups Awards	January 28, 2023	Best Intergenerational Film	Everything Everywhere All at Once	Nominated	
Academy Awards	March 12, 2023	Best Picture	Daniel Kwan, Daniel Scheinert and Jonathan Wang	Won	
Academy Awards	March 12, 2023	Best Director	Daniel Kwan and Daniel Scheinert	Won	
Academy Awards	March 12, 2023	Best Actress	Michelle Yeoh	Won	
Academy Awards	March 12, 2023	Best Supporting Actor	Ke Huy Quan	Won	
Academy Awards	March 12, 2023	Best Supporting Actress	Jamie Lee Curtis	Won	
Academy Awards	March 12, 2023	Best Supporting Actress	Stephanie Hsu	Nominated	
Academy Awards	March 12, 2023	Best Original Screenplay	Daniel Kwan and Daniel Scheinert	Won	
Academy Awards	March 12, 2023	Best Film Editing	Paul Rogers	Won	
Academy Awards	March 12, 2023	Best Original Score	Son Lux	Nominated	
Academy Awards	March 12, 2023	Best Original Song	Ryan Lott, David Byrne and Mitski for "This is a Life"	Nominated	
Academy Awards	March 12, 2023	Best Costume Design	Shirley Kurata	Nominated	
Alliance of Women Film Journalists	January 5, 2023	Best Film	Everything Everywhere All at Once	Nominated	
Alliance of Women Film Journalists	January 5, 2023	Best Director	Daniel Kwan and Daniel Scheinert	Nominated	
Alliance of Women Film Journalists	January 5, 2023	Best Actress	Michelle Yeoh	Won	
Alliance of Women Film Journalists	January 5, 2023	Most Daring Performance	Michelle Yeoh	Nominated	
Alliance of Women Film Journalists	January 5, 2023	Best Actor in a Supporting Role	Ke Huy Quan	Won	
Alliance of Women Film Journalists	January 5, 2023	Best Actress in a Supporting Role	Jamie Lee Curtis	Won	
Alliance of Women Film Journalists	January 5, 2023	Best Woman's Breakthrough Performance	Stephanie Hsu	Nominated	
Alliance of Women Film Journalists	January 5, 2023	Best Screenplay, Original	Daniel Kwan and Daniel Scheinert	Nominated	
Alliance of Women Film Journalists	January 5, 2023	Best Ensemble Cast – Casting Director	Sarah Halley Finn	Nominated	
Alliance of Women Film Journalists	January 5, 2023	Best Cinematography	Larkin Seiple	Nominated	
Alliance of Women Film Journalists	January 5, 2023	Best Editing	Paul Rogers	Won	
Amanda Awards	August 20, 2022	Best Foreign Film	Everything Everywhere All at Once	Won	
American Film Institute Awards	December 9, 2022	Top 10 Films of the Year	Everything Everywhere All at Once	Won (Note: This award does not have a single winner, but recognizes multiple films.)	
American Cinema Editors Awards	March 5, 2023	Best Edited Feature Film – Comedy	Paul Rogers	Won	
Art Directors Guild Awards	February 18, 2023	Excellence in Production Design for a Fantasy Film	Jason Kisvarday	Won	
Artios Awards	March 9, 2023	The Zeitgeist Award	Sarah Halley Finn, Djinous Rowling	Won	
Austin Film Critics Association	January 10, 2023	Best Film	Everything Everywhere All at Once	Won	
Austin Film Critics Association	January 10, 2023	Best Director	Daniel Kwan and Daniel Scheinert	Won	
Austin Film Critics Association	January 10, 2023	Best Actress	Michelle Yeoh	Won	
Austin Film Critics Association	January 10, 2023	Best Supporting Actor	Ke Huy Quan	Won	
Austin Film Critics Association	January 10, 2023	Best Supporting Actress	Jamie Lee Curtis	Nominated	
Austin Film Critics Association	January 10, 2023	Best Supporting Actress	Stephanie Hsu	Won	
Austin Film Critics Association	January 10, 2023	The Robert R. "Bobby" McCurdy Memorial Breakthrough Artist Award	Stephanie Hsu	Nominated	
Austin Film Critics Association	January 10, 2023	Best Original Screenplay	Daniel Kwan and Daniel Scheinert	Won	
Austin Film Critics Association	January 10, 2023	Best Cinematography	Larkin Seiple	Won	
Austin Film Critics Association	January 10, 2023	Best Film Editing	Paul Rogers	Won	
Austin Film Critics Association	January 10, 2023	Best Score	Son Lux	Nominated	
Austin Film Critics Association	January 10, 2023	Best Ensemble	Everything Everywhere All at Once	Won	
Austin Film Critics Association	January 10, 2023	Best Stunts Coordinator	Timothy Eulich	Nominated	
Boston Online Film Critics Association	December 17, 2022	Best Director	Daniel Kwan and Daniel Scheinert	Won	
Boston Online Film Critics Association	December 17, 2022	Best Supporting Actor	Ke Huy Quan	Won	
Boston Online Film Critics Association	December 17, 2022	Best Editing	Paul Rogers	Won	
Boston Society of Film Critics	December 11, 2022	Best Actress	Michelle Yeoh	Won	
Boston Society of Film Critics	December 11, 2022	Best Supporting Actor	Ke Huy Quan	Won	
British Academy Film Awards	February 19, 2023	Best Film	Daniel Kwan, Daniel Scheinert and Jonathan Wang	Nominated	
British Academy Film Awards	February 19, 2023	Best Director	Daniel Kwan and Daniel Scheinert	Nominated	
British Academy Film Awards	February 19, 2023	Best Actress in a Leading Role	Michelle Yeoh	Nominated	
British Academy Film Awards	February 19, 2023	Best Actor in a Supporting Role	Ke Huy Quan	Nominated	
British Academy Film Awards	February 19, 2023	Best Actress in a Supporting Role	Jamie Lee Curtis	Nominated	
British Academy Film Awards	February 19, 2023	Best Original Screenplay	Daniel Kwan and Daniel Scheinert	Nominated	
British Academy Film Awards	February 19, 2023	Best Casting	Sarah Halley Finn	Nominated	
British Academy Film Awards	February 19, 2023	Best Editing	Paul Rogers	Won	
British Academy Film Awards	February 19, 2023	Best Original Score	Son Lux	Nominated	
British Academy Film Awards	February 19, 2023	Best Special Visual Effects	Benjamin Brewer, Ethan Feldbau, Jonathan Kombrinck, Zak Stoltz	Nominated	
British Independent Film Awards	December 4, 2022	Best International Independent Film	Daniel Kwan, Daniel Scheinert, Jonathan Wang, Joe Russo, Anthony Russo, Mike Larocca	Nominated	
Chicago Film Critics Association	December 14, 2022	Best Film	Everything Everywhere All at Once	Nominated	
Chicago Film Critics Association	December 14, 2022	Best Director	Daniel Kwan and Daniel Scheinert	Won	
Chicago Film Critics Association	December 14, 2022	Best Actress	Michelle Yeoh	Nominated	
Chicago Film Critics Association	December 14, 2022	Best Supporting Actor	Ke Huy Quan	Won	
Chicago Film Critics Association	December 14, 2022	Best Supporting Actress	Stephanie Hsu	Nominated	
Chicago Film Critics Association	December 14, 2022	Most Promising Performer	Stephanie Hsu	Nominated	
Chicago Film Critics Association	December 14, 2022	Best Original Screenplay	Daniel Kwan and Daniel Scheinert	Nominated	
Chicago Film Critics Association	December 14, 2022	Best Cinematography	Larkin Seiple	Nominated	
Chicago Film Critics Association	December 14, 2022	Best Editing	Paul Rogers	Won	
Chicago Film Critics Association	December 14, 2022	Best Costume Design	Shirley Kurata	Won	
Chicago Film Critics Association	December 14, 2022	Best Art Direction/Production Design	Everything Everywhere All at Once	Won	
Chicago Film Critics Association	December 14, 2022	Best Use of Visual Effects	Everything Everywhere All at Once	Won	
Costume Designers Guild Awards	February 27, 2023	Excellence in Sci-Fi/Fantasy Film	Shirley Kurata	Won	
Critics' Choice Movie Awards	January 15, 2023	Best Picture	Everything Everywhere All at Once	Won	
Critics' Choice Movie Awards	January 15, 2023	Best Director	Daniel Kwan and Daniel Scheinert	Won	
Critics' Choice Movie Awards	January 15, 2023	Best Actress	Michelle Yeoh	Nominated	
Critics' Choice Movie Awards	January 15, 2023	Best Supporting Actor	Ke Huy Quan	Won	
Critics' Choice Movie Awards	January 15, 2023	Best Supporting Actress	Jamie Lee Curtis	Nominated	
Critics' Choice Movie Awards	January 15, 2023	Best Supporting Actress	Stephanie Hsu	Nominated	
Critics' Choice Movie Awards	January 15, 2023	Best Acting Ensemble	Everything Everywhere All at Once	Nominated	
Critics' Choice Movie Awards	January 15, 2023	Best Original Screenplay	Daniel Kwan and Daniel Scheinert	Won	
Critics' Choice Movie Awards	January 15, 2023	Best Editing	Paul Rogers	Won	
Critics' Choice Movie Awards	January 15, 2023	Best Costume Design	Shirley Kurata	Nominated	
Critics' Choice Movie Awards	January 15, 2023	Best Production Design	Jason Kisvarday and Kelsi Ephraim	Nominated	
Critics' Choice Movie Awards	January 15, 2023	Best Hair and Makeup	Everything Everywhere All at Once	Nominated	
Critics' Choice Movie Awards	January 15, 2023	Best Visual Effects	Everything Everywhere All at Once	Nominated	
Critics' Choice Movie Awards	January 15, 2023	Best Comedy	Everything Everywhere All at Once	Nominated	
Critics' Choice Super Awards	March 16, 2023	Best Science Fiction/Fantasy Movie	Everything Everywhere All at Once	Won	
Critics' Choice Super Awards	March 16, 2023	Best Science Fiction/Fantasy Movie Actor	Ke Huy Quan	Won	
Critics' Choice Super Awards	March 16, 2023	Best Science Fiction/Fantasy Movie Actress	Stephanie Hsu	Nominated	
Critics' Choice Super Awards	March 16, 2023	Best Science Fiction/Fantasy Movie Actress	Michelle Yeoh	Won	
Dallas–Fort Worth Film Critics Association	December 19, 2022	Best Picture	Everything Everywhere All at Once	Won	
Dallas–Fort Worth Film Critics Association	December 19, 2022	Best Director	Daniel Kwan and Daniel Scheinert	Won	
Dallas–Fort Worth Film Critics Association	December 19, 2022	Best Actress	Michelle Yeoh	Runner-up	
Dallas–Fort Worth Film Critics Association	December 19, 2022	Best Supporting Actor	Ke Huy Quan	Won	
Dallas–Fort Worth Film Critics Association	December 19, 2022	Best Screenplay	Daniel Kwan and Daniel Scheinert	Runner-up	
Denver Film Critics Society	January 16, 2023	Best Picture	Everything Everywhere All at Once	Won	
Denver Film Critics Society	January 16, 2023	Best Sci-Fi/Horror	Everything Everywhere All at Once	Won	
Denver Film Critics Society	January 16, 2023	Best Director	Daniel Kwan and Daniel Scheinert	Won	
Denver Film Critics Society	January 16, 2023	Best Original Screenplay	Daniel Kwan and Daniel Scheinert	Won	
Denver Film Critics Society	January 16, 2023	Best Actress	Michelle Yeoh	Won	
Denver Film Critics Society	January 16, 2023	Best Supporting Actress	Stephanie Hsu	Won	
Denver Film Critics Society	January 16, 2023	Best Supporting Actor	Ke Huy Quan	Won	
Directors Guild of America Awards	February 18, 2023	Outstanding Directing – Feature Film	Daniel Kwan and Daniel Scheinert	Won	
Dorian Awards	January 10, 2023	Film of the Year	Everything Everywhere All at Once	Won	
Dorian Awards	January 10, 2023	LGBTQ Film of the Year	Everything Everywhere All at Once	Won	
Dorian Awards	January 10, 2023	Visually Striking Film of the Year	Everything Everywhere All at Once	Won	
Dorian Awards	January 10, 2023	Director of the Year	Daniel Kwan and Daniel Scheinert	Won	
Dorian Awards	January 10, 2023	Screenplay of the Year	Daniel Kwan and Daniel Scheinert	Won	
Dorian Awards	January 10, 2023	Film Performance of the Year	Michelle Yeoh	Won	
Dorian Awards	January 10, 2023	Supporting Film Performance of the Year	Ke Huy Quan	Won	
Dorian Awards	January 10, 2023	Supporting Film Performance of the Year	Jamie Lee Curtis	Nominated	
Dorian Awards	January 10, 2023	Supporting Film Performance of the Year	Stephanie Hsu	Nominated	
Dorian Awards	January 10, 2023	Rising Star Award	Stephanie Hsu	Won	
Dorian Awards	January 10, 2023	Wilde Artist of the Year	Michelle Yeoh	Won	
Florida Film Critics Circle	December 22, 2022	Best Picture	Everything Everywhere All at Once	Won	
Florida Film Critics Circle	December 22, 2022	Best Director	Daniel Kwan and Daniel Scheinert	Nominated	
Florida Film Critics Circle	December 22, 2022	Best Actress	Michelle Yeoh	Nominated	
Florida Film Critics Circle	December 22, 2022	Best Supporting Actor	Ke Huy Quan	Won	
Florida Film Critics Circle	December 22, 2022	Best Supporting Actress	Jamie Lee Curtis	Nominated	
Florida Film Critics Circle	December 22, 2022	Best Supporting Actress	Stephanie Hsu	Nominated	
Florida Film Critics Circle	December 22, 2022	Breakout Award	Stephanie Hsu	Nominated	
Florida Film Critics Circle	December 22, 2022	Best Original Screenplay	Daniel Kwan and Daniel Scheinert	Runner-up	
Florida Film Critics Circle	December 22, 2022	Best Score	Son Lux	Nominated	
Florida Film Critics Circle	December 22, 2022	Best Ensemble	Everything Everywhere All at Once	Won	
Florida Film Critics Circle	December 22, 2022	Best Visual Effects	Everything Everywhere All at Once	Nominated	
Georgia Film Critics Association	January 13, 2023	Best Picture	Everything Everywhere All at Once	Won	
Georgia Film Critics Association	January 13, 2023	Best Director	Daniel Kwan and Daniel Scheinert	Won	
Georgia Film Critics Association	January 13, 2023	Best Actress	Michelle Yeoh	Won	
Georgia Film Critics Association	January 13, 2023	Best Supporting Actor	Ke Huy Quan	Won	
Georgia Film Critics Association	January 13, 2023	Best Supporting Actress	Jamie Lee Curtis	Nominated	
Georgia Film Critics Association	January 13, 2023	Best Supporting Actress	Stephanie Hsu	Won	
Georgia Film Critics Association	January 13, 2023	Best Original Screenplay	Daniel Kwan and Daniel Scheinert	Nominated	
Georgia Film Critics Association	January 13, 2023	Best Production Design	Jason Kisvarday, Kelsi Ephraim	Runner-up	
Georgia Film Critics Association	January 13, 2023	Best Ensemble	Everything Everywhere All at Once	Runner-up	
GLAAD Media Awards	March 30, 2023	Outstanding Film – Wide Release	Everything Everywhere All at Once	Nominated	
Golden Globe Awards	January 10, 2023	Best Motion Picture – Musical or Comedy	Daniel Kwan, Daniel Scheinert, Jonathan Wang, Joe Russo, Anthony Russo, and Mike Larocca	Nominated	
Golden Globe Awards	January 10, 2023	Best Director	Daniel Kwan and Daniel Scheinert	Nominated	
Golden Globe Awards	January 10, 2023	Best Actress – Motion Picture Comedy or Musical	Michelle Yeoh	Won	
Golden Globe Awards	January 10, 2023	Best Supporting Actor – Motion Picture	Ke Huy Quan	Won	
Golden Globe Awards	January 10, 2023	Best Supporting Actress – Motion Picture	Jamie Lee Curtis	Nominated	
Golden Globe Awards	January 10, 2023	Best Screenplay	Daniel Kwan and Daniel Scheinert	Nominated	
Golden Reel Awards	February 26, 2023	Outstanding Achievement in Sound Editing – Feature Dialogue / ADR	Brent Kiser	Nominated	
Golden Reel Awards	February 26, 2023	Outstanding Achievement in Sound Editing – Feature Effects / Foley	Brent Kiser	Nominated	
Golden Reel Awards	February 26, 2023	Outstanding Achievement in Music Editing – Feature Motion Picture	Dean Menta, Luke Wilder, Katherine Gordon Miller	Nominated	
Golden Trailer Awards	June 29, 2023	Best BTS/EPK for a Feature Film (Over 2 minutes)	"Scene at the Academy" (SunnyBoy Entertainment)	Won	
Gotham Independent Film Awards	November 28, 2022	Best Feature	Everything Everywhere All at Once	Won	
Gotham Independent Film Awards	November 28, 2022	Outstanding Lead Performance	Michelle Yeoh	Nominated	
Gotham Independent Film Awards	November 28, 2022	Outstanding Supporting Performance	Ke Huy Quan	Won	
Hollywood Critics Association Awards	February 24, 2023	Best Picture	Everything Everywhere All at Once	Won	
Hollywood Critics Association Awards	February 24, 2023	Best Indie Film	Everything Everywhere All at Once	Nominated	
Hollywood Critics Association Awards	February 24, 2023	Best Director	Daniel Kwan and Daniel Scheinert	Won	
Hollywood Critics Association Awards	February 24, 2023	Best Actress	Michelle Yeoh	Won	
Hollywood Critics Association Awards	February 24, 2023	Best Supporting Actor	Ke Huy Quan	Won	
Hollywood Critics Association Awards	February 24, 2023	Best Supporting Actress	Jamie Lee Curtis	Nominated	
Hollywood Critics Association Awards	February 24, 2023	Best Supporting Actress	Stephanie Hsu	Nominated	
Hollywood Critics Association Awards	February 24, 2023	Best Cast Ensemble	Everything Everywhere All at Once	Won	
Hollywood Critics Association Awards	February 24, 2023	Best Original Screenplay	Daniel Kwan and Daniel Scheinert	Won	
Hollywood Critics Association Creative Arts Awards	February 24, 2023	Best Casting Director	Sarah Halley Finn	Nominated	
Hollywood Critics Association Creative Arts Awards	February 24, 2023	Best Cinematography	Larkin Seiple	Nominated	
Hollywood Critics Association Creative Arts Awards	February 24, 2023	Best Editing	Paul Rogers	Won	
Hollywood Critics Association Creative Arts Awards	February 24, 2023	Best Makeup and Hairstyling	Michelle Chung and Anissa Salazar	Nominated	
Hollywood Critics Association Creative Arts Awards	February 24, 2023	Best Visual Effects	Zak Stoltz, Ethan Feldbau, Benjamin Brewer, and Jeff Desom	Nominated	
Hollywood Critics Association Creative Arts Awards	February 24, 2023	Best Marketing Campaign	Everything Everywhere All at Once	Nominated	
Hollywood Critics Association Creative Arts Awards	February 24, 2023	Best Stunts	Everything Everywhere All at Once	Nominated	
Hollywood Critics Association Midseason Film Awards	July 1, 2022	Best Picture	Everything Everywhere All at Once	Won	
Hollywood Critics Association Midseason Film Awards	July 1, 2022	Best Indie Film	Everything Everywhere All at Once	Won	
Hollywood Critics Association Midseason Film Awards	July 1, 2022	Best Director	Daniel Kwan and Daniel Scheinert	Won	
Hollywood Critics Association Midseason Film Awards	July 1, 2022	Best Actress	Michelle Yeoh	Won	
Hollywood Critics Association Midseason Film Awards	July 1, 2022	Best Supporting Actor	Ke Huy Quan	Won	
Hollywood Critics Association Midseason Film Awards	July 1, 2022	Best Supporting Actress	Jamie Lee Curtis	Nominated	
Hollywood Critics Association Midseason Film Awards	July 1, 2022	Best Supporting Actress	Stephanie Hsu	Won	
Hollywood Critics Association Midseason Film Awards	July 1, 2022	Best Screenplay	Daniel Kwan and Daniel Scheinert	Won	
Hollywood Music in Media Awards	November 16, 2022	Best Original Score in an Independent Film	Son Lux	Nominated	
Hollywood Music in Media Awards	November 16, 2022	Best Original Song in an Independent Film	Ryan Lott, David Byrne and Mitski ("This is a Life")	Nominated	
Hollywood Music in Media Awards	November 16, 2022	Best Music Supervision — Film	Bruce Gilbert	Nominated	
Houston Film Critics Society	February 18, 2023	Best Picture	Everything Everywhere All at Once	Won	
Houston Film Critics Society	February 18, 2023	Best Director	Daniel Kwan and Daniel Scheinert	Won	
Houston Film Critics Society	February 18, 2023	Best Actress	Michelle Yeoh	Nominated	
Houston Film Critics Society	February 18, 2023	Best Supporting Actor	Ke Huy Quan	Won	
Houston Film Critics Society	February 18, 2023	Best Supporting Actress	Jamie Lee Curtis	Nominated	
Houston Film Critics Society	February 18, 2023	Best Supporting Actress	Stephanie Hsu	Nominated	
Houston Film Critics Society	February 18, 2023	Best Screenplay	Daniel Kwan and Daniel Scheinert	Nominated	
Houston Film Critics Society	February 18, 2023	Best Ensemble Cast	Everything Everywhere All at Once	Nominated	
Houston Film Critics Society	February 18, 2023	Best Stunt Coordination Team	Everything Everywhere All at Once	Nominated	
Hugo Awards	October 21, 2023	Best Dramatic Presentation, Long Form	Daniel Kwan and Daniel Scheinert	Won	
Independent Spirit Awards	March 4, 2023	Best Feature	Daniel Kwan, Daniel Scheinert, Jonathan Wang, Joe Russo, Anthony Russo, and Mike Larocca	Won	
Independent Spirit Awards	March 4, 2023	Best Director	Daniel Kwan and Daniel Scheinert	Won	
Independent Spirit Awards	March 4, 2023	Best Lead Performance	Michelle Yeoh	Won	
Independent Spirit Awards	March 4, 2023	Best Supporting Performance	Jamie Lee Curtis	Nominated	
Independent Spirit Awards	March 4, 2023	Best Supporting Performance	Ke Huy Quan	Won	
Independent Spirit Awards	March 4, 2023	Best Breakthrough Performance	Stephanie Hsu	Won	
Independent Spirit Awards	March 4, 2023	Best Screenplay	Daniel Kwan and Daniel Scheinert	Won	
Independent Spirit Awards	March 4, 2023	Best Editing	Paul Rogers	Won	
Indiana Film Journalists Association	December 19, 2022	Best Picture	Everything Everywhere All at Once	Won	
Indiana Film Journalists Association	December 19, 2022	Original Vision Award	Everything Everywhere All at Once	Won	
Indiana Film Journalists Association	December 19, 2022	Best Supporting Performance	Ke Huy Quan	Won	
Indiana Film Journalists Association	December 19, 2022	Best Editing	Paul Rogers	Won	
Iowa Film Critics Association	January 11, 2023	Best Film	Everything Everywhere All at Once	Won	
Iowa Film Critics Association	January 11, 2023	Best Director	Daniel Kwan and Daniel Scheinert	Won	
Iowa Film Critics Association	January 11, 2023	Best Supporting Actor	Ke Huy Quan	Won	
Iowa Film Critics Association	January 11, 2023	Supporting Actress	Jamie Lee Curtis	Won	
Kansas City Film Critics Circle	January 22, 2023	Best Film	Everything Everywhere All at Once	Won	
Kansas City Film Critics Circle	January 22, 2023	Best LGBTQ Film	Everything Everywhere All at Once	Won	
Kansas City Film Critics Circle	January 22, 2023	Best Science Fiction/Fantasy/Horror Film	Everything Everywhere All at Once	Won	
Kansas City Film Critics Circle	January 22, 2023	Best Original Screenplay	Daniel Kwan and Daniel Scheinert	Won	
Kansas City Film Critics Circle	January 22, 2023	Best Director	Daniel Kwan and Daniel Scheinert	Won	
Kansas City Film Critics Circle	January 22, 2023	Best Actress	Michelle Yeoh	Won	
Kansas City Film Critics Circle	January 22, 2023	Best Supporting Actor	Ke Huy Quan	Won	
Las Vegas Film Critics Society	December 13, 2022	Best Picture	Everything Everywhere All at Once	Won	
Las Vegas Film Critics Society	December 13, 2022	Best Horror/Sci-Fi	Everything Everywhere All at Once	Won	
Las Vegas Film Critics Society	December 13, 2022	Best Actress	Michelle Yeoh	Won	
Las Vegas Film Critics Society	December 13, 2022	Best Supporting Actor	Ke Huy Quan	Won	
Las Vegas Film Critics Society	December 13, 2022	Best Director	Daniel Kwan and Daniel Scheinert	Won	
Las Vegas Film Critics Society	December 13, 2022	Best Original Screenplay	Daniel Kwan and Daniel Scheinert	Won	
Las Vegas Film Critics Society	December 13, 2022	Best Film Editing	Paul Rogers	Won	
Location Managers Guild Awards	August 27, 2022	Outstanding Locations in a Contemporary Film	Everything Everywhere All at Once	Nominated	
London Film Critics' Circle	February 5, 2023	Film of the Year	Everything Everywhere All at Once	Nominated	
London Film Critics' Circle	February 5, 2023	Director of the Year	Daniel Kwan and Daniel Scheinert	Nominated	
London Film Critics' Circle	February 5, 2023	Actress of the Year	Michelle Yeoh	Nominated	
London Film Critics' Circle	February 5, 2023	Supporting Actor of the Year	Ke Huy Quan	Nominated	
London Film Critics' Circle	February 5, 2023	Screenwriter of the Year	Daniel Kwan and Daniel Scheinert	Nominated	
London Film Critics' Circle	February 5, 2023	Technical Achievement Award	Paul Rogers	Nominated	
Los Angeles Film Critics Association	December 11, 2022	Best Film	Everything Everywhere All at Once (tied with Tár)	Won	
Los Angeles Film Critics Association	December 11, 2022	Best Lead Performance	Michelle Yeoh	Runner-up	
Los Angeles Film Critics Association	December 11, 2022	Best Supporting Performance	Ke Huy Quan	Won	
Los Angeles Film Critics Association	December 11, 2022	Production Design	Jason Kisvarday	Runner-up	
Make-Up Artists and Hair Stylists Guild	February 11, 2023	Best Contemporary Make-Up in a Feature-Length Motion Picture	Michelle Chung, Erin Rosenmann, Dania A. Ridgway	Won	
Make-Up Artists and Hair Stylists Guild	February 11, 2023	Best Contemporary Hair Styling in a Feature-Length Motion Picture	Anissa Salazar, Meghan Heaney, Miki Caporusso	Nominated	
National Board of Review Awards	December 8, 2022	Top Ten Films	Everything Everywhere All at Once	Won	
National Board of Review Awards	December 8, 2022	Best Actress	Michelle Yeoh	Won	
National Society of Film Critics	January 7, 2023	Best Actress	Michelle Yeoh	Runner-up	
National Society of Film Critics	January 7, 2023	Best Supporting Actor	Ke Huy Quan	Won	
Nebula Awards	May 14, 2023	Ray Bradbury Award	Daniel Kwan and Daniel Scheinert	Won	
New York Film Critics Circle Awards	December 2, 2022	Best Supporting Actor	Ke Huy Quan	Won	
New York Film Critics Online Awards	December 11, 2022	Top Films of the Year	Everything Everywhere All at Once	Won	
New York Film Critics Online Awards	December 11, 2022	Best Director	Daniel Kwan and Daniel Scheinert	Won	
New York Film Critics Online Awards	December 11, 2022	Best Actress	Michelle Yeoh	Won	
North Texas Film Critics Association	December 21, 2022	Best Picture	Everything Everywhere All at Once	Won	
North Texas Film Critics Association	December 21, 2022	Best Director	Daniel Kwan and Daniel Scheinert	Won	
North Texas Film Critics Association	December 21, 2022	Best Actress	Michelle Yeoh	Won	
North Texas Film Critics Association	December 21, 2022	Best Supporting Actor	Ke Huy Quan	Won	
North Texas Film Critics Association	December 21, 2022	Best Supporting Actress	Jamie Lee Curtis	Won	
Online Film Critics Society	January 23, 2023	Best Picture	Everything Everywhere All at Once	Won	
Online Film Critics Society	January 23, 2023	Best Director	Daniel Kwan, Daniel Scheinert	Won	
Online Film Critics Society	January 23, 2023	Best Actress	Michelle Yeoh	Won	
Online Film Critics Society	January 23, 2023	Best Supporting Actor	Ke Huy Quan	Won	
Online Film Critics Society	January 23, 2023	Best Supporting Actress	Jamie Lee Curtis	Nominated	
Online Film Critics Society	January 23, 2023	Best Supporting Actress	Stephanie Hsu	Nominated	
Online Film Critics Society	January 23, 2023	Best Original Screenplay	Daniel Kwan, Daniel Scheinert	Won	
Online Film Critics Society	January 23, 2023	Best Editing	Paul Rogers	Won	
Online Film Critics Society	January 23, 2023	Best Costume Design	Everything Everywhere All at Once	Nominated	
Online Film Critics Society	January 23, 2023	Best Production Design	Everything Everywhere All at Once	Nominated	
Online Film Critics Society	January 23, 2023	Best Visual Effects	Everything Everywhere All at Once	Nominated	
Phoenix Film Critics Society	December 18, 2022	Best Picture	Everything Everywhere All at Once	Won	
Phoenix Film Critics Society	December 18, 2022	Best Ensemble Acting	Everything Everywhere All at Once	Won	
Phoenix Film Critics Society	December 18, 2022	Best Director	Daniel Kwan and Daniel Scheinert	Won	
Phoenix Film Critics Society	December 18, 2022	Best Original Screenplay	Daniel Kwan and Daniel Scheinert	Won	
Phoenix Film Critics Society	December 18, 2022	Best Actress	Michelle Yeoh	Won	
Phoenix Film Critics Society	December 18, 2022	Best Supporting Actor	Ke Huy Quan	Won	
Phoenix Film Critics Society	December 18, 2022	Best Editing	Paul Rogers	Won	
Producers Guild of America Awards	February 25, 2023	Outstanding Producer of Theatrical Motion Pictures	Jonathan Wang, Dan Kwan, and Daniel Scheinert	Won	
The ReFrame Stamp	March 1, 2023	2022 Top 100-Grossing Narrative Feature Recipients	Everything Everywhere All at Once	Won	
San Diego Film Critics Society	January 6, 2023	Best Picture	Everything Everywhere All at Once	Nominated	
San Diego Film Critics Society	January 6, 2023	Best Director	Daniel Kwan and Daniel Scheinert	Won	
San Diego Film Critics Society	January 6, 2023	Best Actress	Michelle Yeoh	Nominated	
San Diego Film Critics Society	January 6, 2023	Best Supporting Actor	Ke Huy Quan	Nominated	
San Diego Film Critics Society	January 6, 2023	Best Supporting Actress	Jamie Lee Curtis	Nominated	
San Diego Film Critics Society	January 6, 2023	Best Supporting Actress	Stephanie Hsu	Runner-up	
San Diego Film Critics Society	January 6, 2023	Best Original Screenplay	Daniel Kwan and Daniel Scheinert	Nominated	
San Diego Film Critics Society	January 6, 2023	Best Editing	Paul Rogers	Won	
San Diego Film Critics Society	January 6, 2023	Best Production Design	Jason Kisvarday	Nominated	
San Diego Film Critics Society	January 6, 2023	Best Ensemble	Everything Everywhere All at Once	Won	
San Diego Film Critics Society	January 6, 2023	Best Visual Effects	Everything Everywhere All at Once	Nominated	
San Francisco Bay Area Film Critics Circle	January 9, 2023	Best Picture	Everything Everywhere All at Once	Nominated	
San Francisco Bay Area Film Critics Circle	January 9, 2023	Best Director	Daniel Kwan and Daniel Scheinert	Nominated	
San Francisco Bay Area Film Critics Circle	January 9, 2023	Best Actress	Michelle Yeoh	Nominated	
San Francisco Bay Area Film Critics Circle	January 9, 2023	Best Supporting Actor	Ke Huy Quan	Won	
San Francisco Bay Area Film Critics Circle	January 9, 2023	Best Supporting Actress	Jamie Lee Curtis	Won	
San Francisco Bay Area Film Critics Circle	January 9, 2023	Best Original Screenplay	Daniel Kwan and Daniel Scheinert	Nominated	
San Francisco Bay Area Film Critics Circle	January 9, 2023	Best Film Editing	Paul Rogers	Won	
San Francisco Bay Area Film Critics Circle	January 9, 2023	Best Production Design	Jason Kisvarday and Kelsi Ephraim	Won	
Santa Barbara International Film Festival	February 15, 2023	Virtuoso Awards	Ke Huy Quan	Won	
Santa Barbara International Film Festival	February 15, 2023	Virtuoso Awards	Stephanie Hsu	Won	
Santa Barbara International Film Festival	February 15, 2023	Variety Artisans Award - Editing	Paul Rogers	Won	
Santa Barbara International Film Festival	February 15, 2023	Variety Artisans Award - Score	Son Lux	Won	
Satellite Awards	March 3, 2023	Best Motion Picture – Comedy or Musical	Everything Everywhere All at Once	Won	
Satellite Awards	March 3, 2023	Best Actress in a Motion Picture – Comedy or Musical	Michelle Yeoh	Won	
Satellite Awards	March 3, 2023	Best Actor in a Supporting Role	Ke Huy Quan	Won	
Satellite Awards	March 3, 2023	Best Actress in a Supporting Role	Jamie Lee Curtis	Nominated	
Satellite Awards	March 3, 2023	Best Original Screenplay	Daniel Kwan and Daniel Scheinert	Nominated	
Satellite Awards	March 3, 2023	Best Film Editing	Paul Rogers	Won	
Saturn Awards	October 25, 2022	Best Fantasy Film	Everything Everywhere All at Once	Won	
Saturn Awards	October 25, 2022	Best Actress	Michelle Yeoh	Won	
Saturn Awards	October 25, 2022	Best Supporting Actor	Ke Huy Quan	Won	
Saturn Awards	October 25, 2022	Best Supporting Actress	Stephanie Hsu	Nominated	
Saturn Awards	October 25, 2022	Best Writing	Daniel Kwan and Daniel Scheinert	Nominated	
Saturn Awards	October 25, 2022	Best Editing	Paul Rogers	Nominated	
Saturn Awards	October 25, 2022	Best Production Design	Jason Kisvarday	Nominated	
Saturn Awards	October 25, 2022	Best 4K Special Edition Film Release	Everything Everywhere All at Once	Won	
Screen Actors Guild Awards	February 26, 2023	Outstanding Performance by a Cast in a Motion Picture	Jamie Lee Curtis, James Hong, Stephanie Hsu, Ke Huy Quan, Harry Shum Jr., Jenny Slate, Michelle Yeoh	Won	
Screen Actors Guild Awards	February 26, 2023	Outstanding Performance by a Female Actor in a Leading Role	Michelle Yeoh	Won	
Screen Actors Guild Awards	February 26, 2023	Outstanding Performance by a Male Actor in a Supporting Role	Ke Huy Quan	Won	
Screen Actors Guild Awards	February 26, 2023	Outstanding Performance by a Female Actor in a Supporting Role	Jamie Lee Curtis	Won	
Screen Actors Guild Awards	February 26, 2023	Outstanding Performance by a Female Actor in a Supporting Role	Stephanie Hsu	Nominated	
Seattle Film Critics Society	January 17, 2023	Best Picture	Everything Everywhere All at Once	Won	
Seattle Film Critics Society	January 17, 2023	Best Director	Daniel Kwan and Daniel Scheinert	Won	
Seattle Film Critics Society	January 17, 2023	Best Actress in a Leading Role	Michelle Yeoh	Nominated	
Seattle Film Critics Society	January 17, 2023	Best Actor in a Supporting Role	Ke Huy Quan	Won	
Seattle Film Critics Society	January 17, 2023	Best Actress in a Supporting Role	Stephanie Hsu	Nominated	
Seattle Film Critics Society	January 17, 2023	Best Screenplay	Daniel Kwan and Daniel Scheinert	Nominated	
Seattle Film Critics Society	January 17, 2023	Best Cinematography	Larkin Seiple	Nominated	
Seattle Film Critics Society	January 17, 2023	Best Costume Design	Shirley Kurata	Nominated	
Seattle Film Critics Society	January 17, 2023	Best Film Editing	Paul Rogers	Won	
Seattle Film Critics Society	January 17, 2023	Best Production Design	Jason Kisvarday, Kelsi Ephraim	Nominated	
Seattle Film Critics Society	January 17, 2023	Best Visual Effects	Zak Stoltz, Ethan Feldbau, Benjamin Brewer, Jeff Desom	Nominated	
Seattle Film Critics Society	January 17, 2023	Best Villain	Jobu Tupaki (portrayed by Stephanie Hsu)	Nominated	
Seattle Film Critics Society	January 17, 2023	Best Ensemble Cast	Sarah Halley Finn	Nominated	
Seattle Film Critics Society	January 17, 2023	Best Action Choreography	Everything Everywhere All at Once	Nominated	
Set Decorators Society of America Awards	February 14, 2023	Best Picture	Everything Everywhere All at Once	Won	
Set Decorators Society of America Awards	February 14, 2023	Best Achievement in Decor/Design of a Science Fiction or Fantasy Feature Film	Kelsi Ephraim, Jason Kisvarday	Won	
Society of Composers & Lyricists Awards	February 15, 2023	Outstanding Original Score for an Independent Film	Son Lux	Won	
Southeastern Film Critics Association	December 18, 2022	Best Film	Everything Everywhere All at Once	Won	
Southeastern Film Critics Association	December 18, 2022	Best Actress	Michelle Yeoh	Won	
Southeastern Film Critics Association	December 18, 2022	Best Supporting Actor	Ke Huy Quan	Won	
Southeastern Film Critics Association	December 18, 2022	Best Director	Daniel Kwan and Daniel Scheinert	Won	
Southeastern Film Critics Association	December 18, 2022	Best Original Screenplay	Daniel Kwan and Daniel Scheinert	Won	
St. Louis Film Critics Association	December 18, 2022	Best Film	Everything Everywhere All at Once	Won	
St. Louis Film Critics Association	December 18, 2022	Best Action Film	Everything Everywhere All at Once	Nominated	
St. Louis Film Critics Association	December 18, 2022	Best Comedy Film	Everything Everywhere All at Once	Nominated	
St. Louis Film Critics Association	December 18, 2022	Best Director	Daniel Kwan and Daniel Scheinert	Runner-up	
St. Louis Film Critics Association	December 18, 2022	Best Actress	Michelle Yeoh	Won	
St. Louis Film Critics Association	December 18, 2022	Best Supporting Actor	Ke Huy Quan	Won	
St. Louis Film Critics Association	December 18, 2022	Best Original Screenplay	Daniel Kwan and Daniel Scheinert	Won	
St. Louis Film Critics Association	December 18, 2022	Best Editing	Paul Rogers	Won	
St. Louis Film Critics Association	December 18, 2022	Best Visual Effects	Zak Stoltz, Ethan Feldbau, Benjamin Brewer and Jeff Desom	Runner-up	
St. Louis Film Critics Association	December 18, 2022	Best Ensemble	Everything Everywhere All at Once	Nominated	
Toronto Film Critics Association	January 8, 2023	Best Film	Everything Everywhere All at Once	Runner-up	
Toronto Film Critics Association	January 8, 2023	Best Director	Daniel Kwan and Daniel Scheinert	Runner-up	
Toronto Film Critics Association	January 8, 2023	Best Actress	Michelle Yeoh	Runner-up	
Toronto Film Critics Association	January 8, 2023	Best Supporting Actor	Ke Huy Quan	Won	
Toronto Film Critics Association	January 8, 2023	Best Screenplay	Daniel Kwan and Daniel Scheinert	Runner-up	
Vancouver Film Critics Circle	February 13, 2023	Best Film	Everything Everywhere All at Once	Won	
Vancouver Film Critics Circle	February 13, 2023	Best Director	Daniel Kwan and Daniel Scheinert	Won	
Vancouver Film Critics Circle	February 13, 2023	Best Actress	Michelle Yeoh	Won	
Vancouver Film Critics Circle	February 13, 2023	Best Supporting Actor	Ke Huy Quan	Nominated	
Vancouver Film Critics Circle	February 13, 2023	Best Supporting Actress	Jamie Lee Curtis	Nominated	
Vancouver Film Critics Circle	February 13, 2023	Best Supporting Actress	Stephanie Hsu	Nominated	
Vancouver Film Critics Circle	February 13, 2023	Best Screenplay	Daniel Kwan and Daniel Scheinert	Nominated	
Washington D.C. Area Film Critics Association	December 12, 2022	Best Film	Everything Everywhere All at Once	Won	
Washington D.C. Area Film Critics Association	December 12, 2022	Best Director	Daniel Kwan and Daniel Scheinert	Won	
Washington D.C. Area Film Critics Association	December 12, 2022	Best Actress	Michelle Yeoh	Nominated	
Washington D.C. Area Film Critics Association	December 12, 2022	Best Supporting Actor	Ke Huy Quan	Won	
Washington D.C. Area Film Critics Association	December 12, 2022	Best Supporting Actress	Jamie Lee Curtis	Nominated	
Washington D.C. Area Film Critics Association	December 12, 2022	Best Supporting Actress	Stephanie Hsu	Nominated	
Washington D.C. Area Film Critics Association	December 12, 2022	Best Original Screenplay	Daniel Kwan and Daniel Scheinert	Won	
Washington D.C. Area Film Critics Association	December 12, 2022	Best Cinematography	Larkin Seiple	Nominated	
Washington D.C. Area Film Critics Association	December 12, 2022	Best Editing	Paul Rogers	Nominated	
Washington D.C. Area Film Critics Association	December 12, 2022	Best Production Design	Jason Kisvarday and Kelsi Ephraim	Nominated	
Washington D.C. Area Film Critics Association	December 12, 2022	Best Acting Ensemble	Everything Everywhere All at Once	Nominated	
Writers Guild of America Awards	March 5, 2023	Best Original Screenplay	Daniel Kwan and Daniel Scheinert	Won	
