= Chicago Film Critics Association Awards 2022 =

Annual US film awards ceremony

35th Chicago Film Critics Association Awards
- Date: December 14, 2022
- Site: Chicago, Illinois, U.S.

Highlights
- Best Picture: The Banshees of Inisherin
- Most awards: Everything Everywhere All at Once (6)
- Most nominations: Everything Everywhere All at Once (12)

The 35th Chicago Film Critics Association Awards were announced on December 14, 2022. The awards honor the best in film for 2022. The nominations were announced on December 12, 2022. Everything Everywhere All at Once received the most nominations (12), followed by The Banshees of Inisherin (7) and Aftersun (6).

== Winners and nominees ==
The winners and nominees for the 35th Chicago Film Critics Association Awards are as follows:

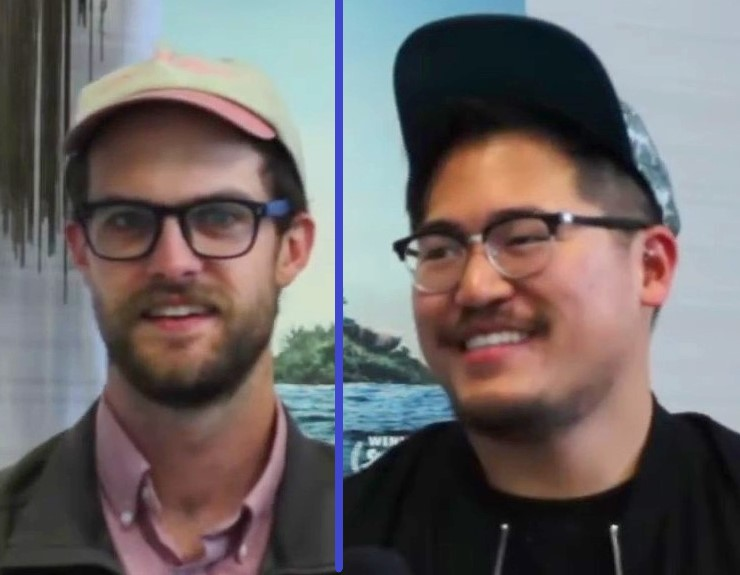
Daniel Scheinert and Daniel Kwan, Best Director winners

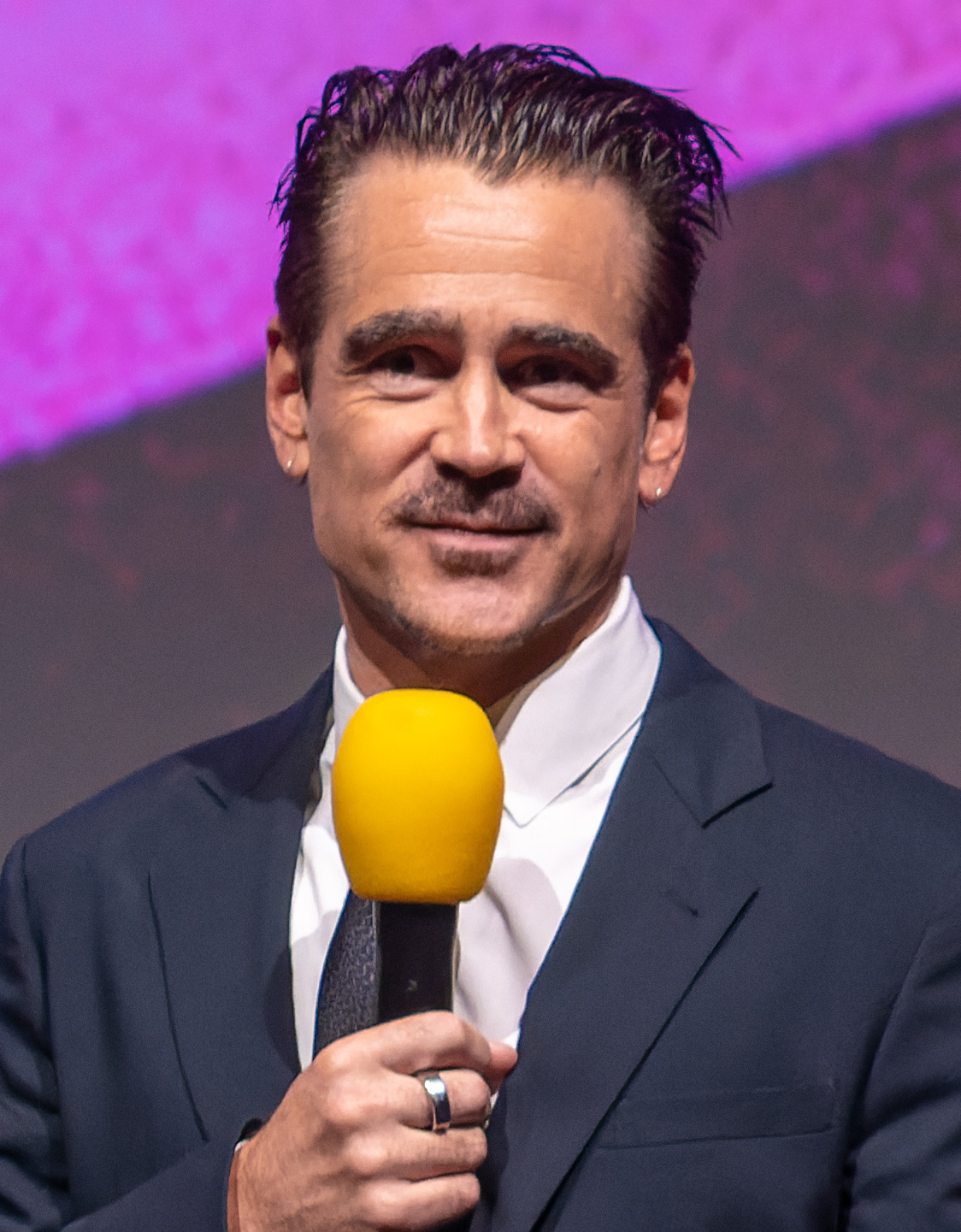
Colin Farrell, Best Actor winner

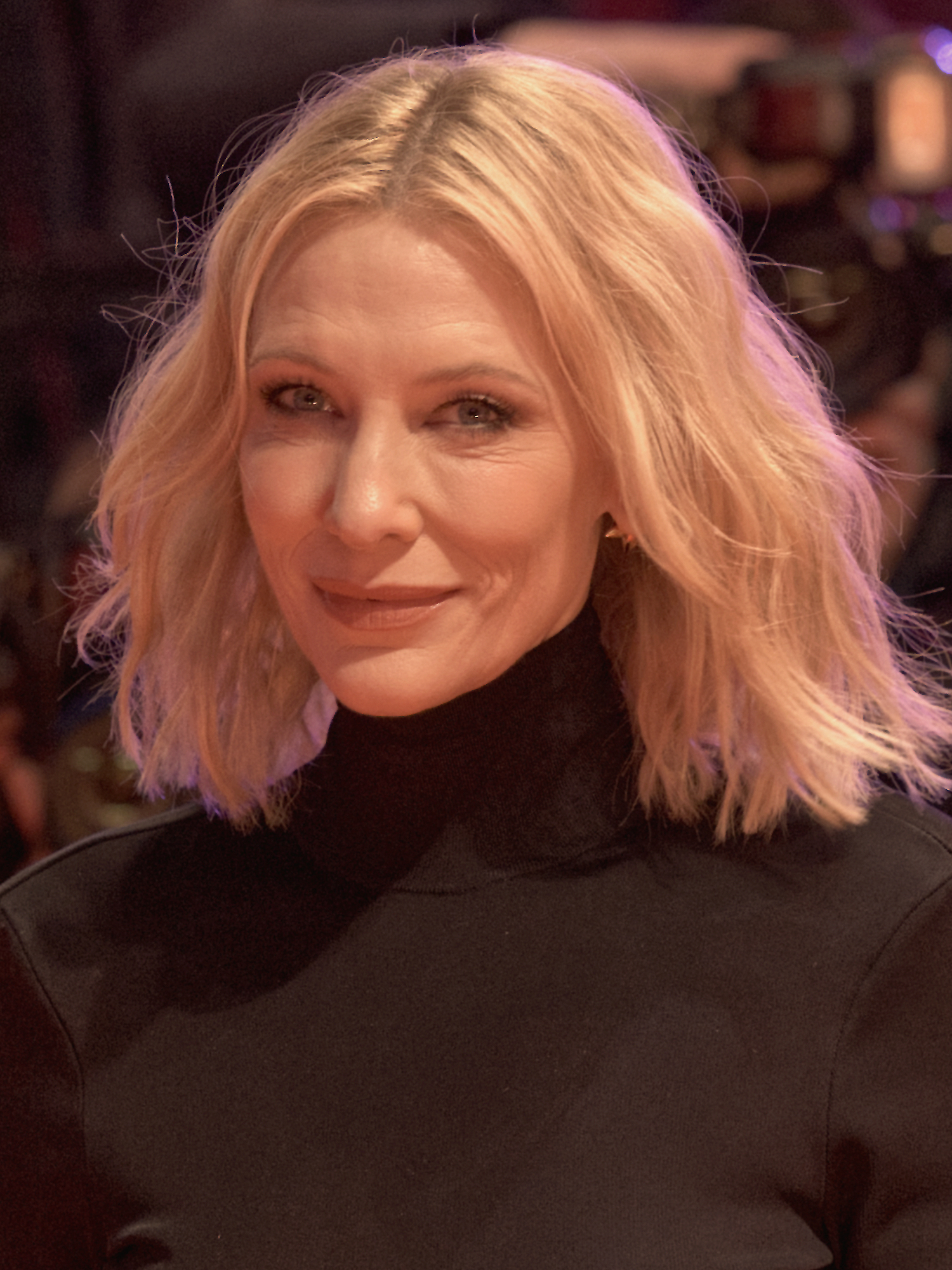
Cate Blanchett, Best Actress winner

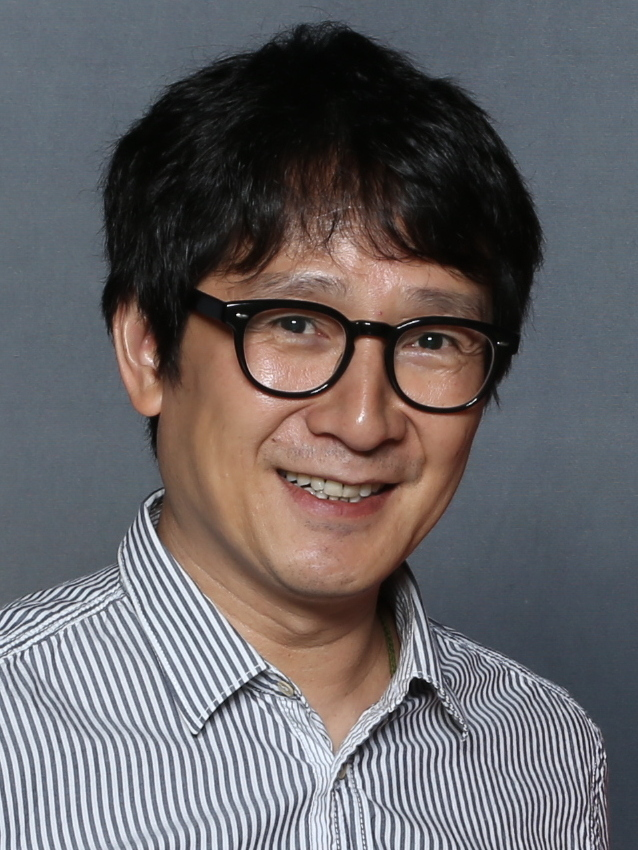
Ke Huy Quan, Best Supporting Actor winner

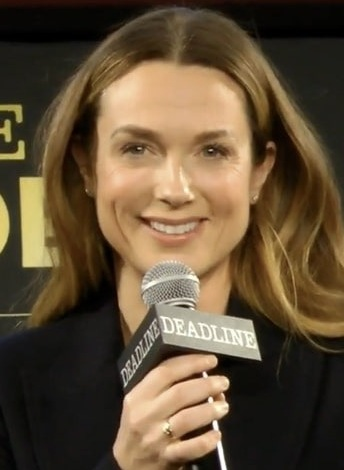
Kerry Condon, Best Supporting Actress winner

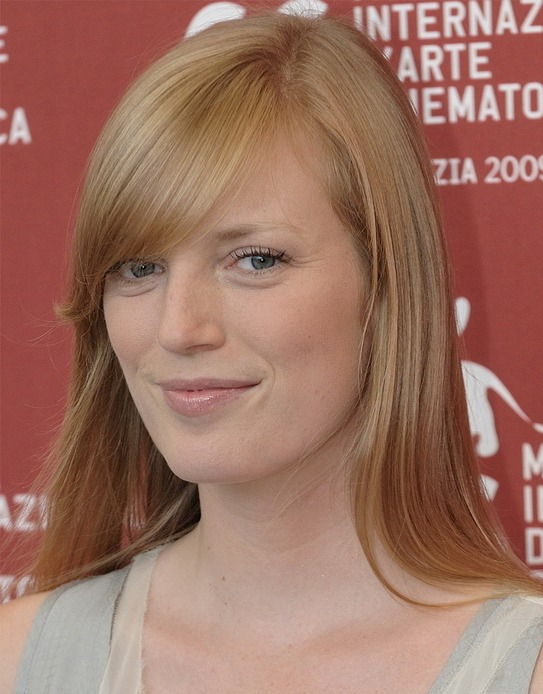
Sarah Polley, Best Adapted Screenplay winner

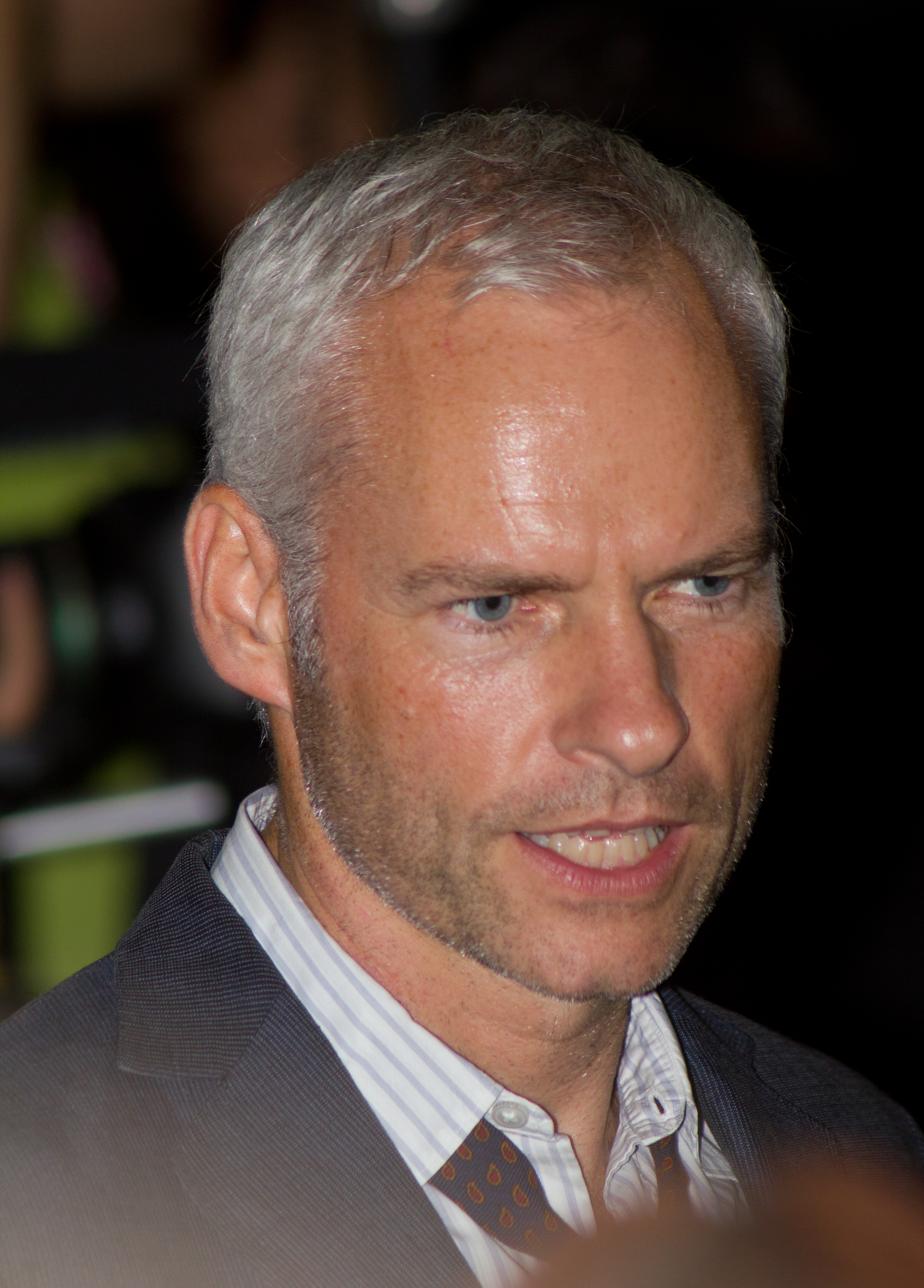
Martin McDonagh, Best Original Screenplay winner

=== Awards ===
| Best Film | Best Director |
|---|---|
| The Banshees of Inisherin; Aftersun; Decision to Leave; Everything Everywhere All at Once; Tár | Daniel Kwan and Daniel Scheinert – Everything Everywhere All at Once; Park Chan-wook – Decision to Leave; Todd Field – Tár; Sarah Polley – Women Talking; S. S. Rajamouli – RRR |
| Best Actor | Best Actress |
| Colin Farrell – The Banshees of Inisherin as Pádraic Súilleabháin; Austin Butler – Elvis as Elvis Presley; Brendan Fraser – The Whale as Charlie; Paul Mescal – Aftersun as Calum; Bill Nighy – Living as Mr. Williams | Cate Blanchett – Tár as Lydia Tár; Ana de Armas – Blonde as Norma Jeane Mortenson / Marilyn Monroe; Mia Goth – Pearl as Pearl; Andrea Riseborough – To Leslie as Leslie Rowlands; Michelle Yeoh – Everything Everywhere All at Once as Evelyn Quan Wang |
| Best Supporting Actor | Best Supporting Actress |
| Ke Huy Quan – Everything Everywhere All at Once as Waymond Wang; Brendan Gleeson – The Banshees of Inisherin as Colm Doherty; Brian Tyree Henry – Causeway as James Aucoin; Barry Keoghan – The Banshees of Inisherin as Dominic Kearney; Mark Rylance – Bones and All as Sully | Kerry Condon – The Banshees of Inisherin as Siobhán Súilleabháin; Hong Chau – The Whale as Liz; Stephanie Hsu – Everything Everywhere All at Once as Joy Wang / Jobu Tupaki; Janelle Monáe – Glass Onion: A Knives Out Mystery as Helen Brand / Cassandra "Andi" Brand; Michelle Williams – The Fabelmans as Mitzi Fabelman |
| Best Original Screenplay | Best Adapted Screenplay |
| The Banshees of Inisherin – Martin McDonagh; Aftersun – Charlotte Wells; Everything Everywhere All at Once – Daniel Kwan and Daniel Scheinert; The Fabelmans – Tony Kushner and Steven Spielberg; Tár – Todd Field | Women Talking – Sarah Polley; After Yang – Kogonada; Bones and All – David Kajganich; Glass Onion: A Knives Out Mystery – Rian Johnson; Guillermo del Toro's Pinocchio – Guillermo del Toro and Patrick McHale |
| Best Animated Film | Best Foreign Language Film |
| Guillermo del Toro's Pinocchio; Apollo 10½: A Space Age Childhood; Mad God; Marcel the Shell with Shoes On; Turning Red | Decision to Leave; Bardo, False Chronicle of a Handful of Truths; Close; Happening; RRR; Saint Omer |
| Best Documentary Film | Best Original Score |
| Fire of Love; All the Beauty and the Bloodshed; Bad Axe; Descendant; Moonage Daydream | Babylon – Justin Hurwitz; The Banshees of Inisherin – Carter Burwell; The Batman – Michael Giacchino; Guillermo del Toro's Pinocchio – Alexandre Desplat; RRR – M. M. Keeravani |
| Best Art Direction / Production Design | Best Costume Design |
| Everything Everywhere All at Once; After Yang; Avatar: The Way of Water; Babylon; Glass Onion: A Knives Out Mystery | Everything Everywhere All at Once – Shirley Kurata; Babylon – Mary Zophres; Black Panther: Wakanda Forever – Ruth E. Carter; Corsage – Monika Buttinger; The Northman – Linda Muir |
| Best Editing | Best Cinematography |
| Everything Everywhere All at Once – Paul Rogers; Aftersun – Blair McClendon; Babylon – Tom Cross; Decision to Leave – Kim Sang-beom; Tár – Monika Willi | Decision to Leave – Kim Ji-Yong; Babylon – Linus Sandgren; Bardo, False Chronicle of a Handful of Truths – Darius Khondji; Everything Everywhere All at Once – Larkin Seiple; Top Gun: Maverick – Claudio Miranda |
| Best Use of Visual Effects | Milos Stehlik Breakthrough Filmmaker Award |
| Everything Everywhere All at Once; Avatar: The Way of Water; Nope; RRR; Top Gun: Maverick | Charlotte Wells – Aftersun; Alice Diop – Saint Omer; Audrey Diwan – Happening; John Patton Ford – Emily the Criminal; Jane Schoenbrun – We're All Going to the World's Fair |
| Most Promising Performer | |
| Austin Butler – Elvis as Elvis Presley; Frankie Corio – Aftersun as Sophie Paterson; Danielle Deadwyler – Till as Mamie Till-Mobley; Stephanie Hsu – Everything Everywhere All at Once as Joy Wang / Jobu Tupaki; Amber Midthunder – Prey as Naru | |

== Awards breakdown ==
The following films received multiple nominations:

| Nominations | Film |
|---|---|
| 12 | Everything Everywhere All at Once |
| 7 | The Banshees of Inisherin |
| 6 | Aftersun |
| 5 | Babylon |
| 5 | Decision to Leave |
| 5 | Tár |
| 4 | RRR |
| 3 | Glass Onion: A Knives Out Mystery |
| 3 | Guillermo del Toro's Pinocchio |
| 2 | After Yang |
| 2 | Avatar: The Way of Water |
| 2 | Bardo, False Chronicle of a Handful of Truths |
| 2 | Bones and All |
| 2 | Elvis |
| 2 | The Fabelmans |
| 2 | Happening |
| 2 | Saint Omer |
| 2 | Top Gun: Maverick |
| 2 | The Whale |
| 2 | Women Talking |

The following films received multiple wins:

| Wins | Film |
|---|---|
| 6 | Everything Everywhere All at Once |
| 4 | The Banshees of Inisherin |
| 2 | Decision to Leave |
