= Close (2022 film) =

Film by Lukas Dhont

- Theatrical release poster
- Directed by: Lukas Dhont
- Screenplay by: Lukas Dhont; Angelo Tijssens
- Produced by: Dirk Impens; Michiel Dhont
- Starring: Eden Dambrine; Gustav De Waele; Émilie Dequenne; Léa Drucker
- Cinematography: Frank van den Eeden
- Edited by: Alain Dessauvage
- Music by: Valentin Hadjadj
- Production companies: Menuet; Diaphana Films; Topkapi Films; Versus Production
- Distributed by: Lumière (Benelux); Diaphana Distribution (France)
- Release dates: 26 May 2022 (Cannes); 1 November 2022 (France); 2 November 2022 (Belgium); 3 November 2022 (Netherlands)
- Running time: 104 minutes
- Countries: Belgium; France; Netherlands
- Languages: French; Dutch
- Box office: $5.2 million

Close (/kloʊs/) is a 2022 coming-of-age drama film directed by Lukas Dhont, co-written by Dhont and Angelo Tijssens, reteaming after their first feature film Girl (2018). Starring Eden Dambrine, Gustav De Waele, Émilie Dequenne and Léa Drucker, it follows two teenage boys whose close friendship is thrown into disarray when their schoolmates notice their intimacy, causing a rift between them.

The film had its world premiere at the main competition of the 2022 Cannes Film Festival on 26 May, where it won the Grand Prix, and received critical acclaim. It was theatrically released in France on 1 November by Diaphana Distribution, and in Benelux on 2 November by Lumière. It was nominated for the Best International Feature Film at the 95th Academy Awards. It also won the André Cavens Award for Best Film by the Belgian Film Critics Association. At the 12th Magritte Awards, Close received ten nominations, including Most Promising Actor for Dambrine and De Waele, becoming the most nominated film of the ceremony and ultimately winning seven awards.

== Plot ==
In rural Belgium, two 13-year-old boys, Léo and Rémi, are best friends who exhibit a deeply intimate affection for one another. They have a habit of sleeping in the same bed in Rémi's bedroom. Rémi's parents, Sophie and Peter, accept this without judgment and love Léo like a second child. Léo's family helps run agricultural work at a flower farm, where he and Rémi like to play together.

At school, a trio of female classmates openly ask if the two are a couple. Léo vehemently denies it, while Rémi does not comment. Léo becomes uneasy with this external perception, exacerbated by homophobic slurs directed towards him by other boys. Fearing being ostracized, he begins new friendships and takes up ice hockey, from which he deliberately excludes Rémi. One night, while sleeping over at Rémi's, Léo decides to sleep on a separate mattress. Upon waking up, he finds Rémi sleeping on the same mattress as him. Léo turns aggressive, leaving Rémi hurt and confused. Léo becomes progressively distant from Rémi, despite Rémi's attempts at interaction. He stops sleeping over, starts riding his bicycle with students other than Rémi, continues participating in ice hockey, and spends more time working with his family at the farm. Rémi finally confronts him, to which he acts defensively. Distraught and angry, Rémi attacks Léo and the two fight.

One day, after a school trip from which Rémi is absent, the class is informed that Rémi has killed himself, which Léo believes his withdrawal caused. However, he closes off his emotions from everyone else, unable to talk to anyone about it during the class therapy sessions offered by the school. The fact that his classmates describe Rémi in obituaries as a happy and friendly boy triggers a defiant opposition in Léo. Léo unsuccessfully tries to suppress his inner pain and cover it up by resuming ice hockey and gardening work with his family. Although none of his new friendships comes close to the deep connection he had with Rémi, Léo is able to confide in his older brother Charlie for comfort.

Following Rémi's funeral, Léo knows he has to talk to Sophie, wanting to maintain his connection with her, but is anxious to confess. When Sophie and Peter have dinner with Léo's family, Peter breaks down when Charlie describes his future plans, as Sophie and Peter mourn the loss of Rémi's future. When summer vacation begins, Léo visits Sophie at her workplace without warning. As she drives him home, he finally confesses to her that he believes Rémi's suicide is his fault for pushing him away. After an initial moment of tension, she tenderly hugs and comforts him as they cry together. Sometime later, she and Peter have moved away, leaving the house empty. Léo walks across the field which he and Rémi used to run through, remembering their connection and allowing himself to finally grieve for Rémi.

== Cast ==
- Eden Dambrine as Léo
- Gustav De Waele as Rémi
- Émilie Dequenne as Sophie, Rémi's mother
- Léa Drucker as Nathalie, Léo's mother
- Kevin Janssens as Peter, Rémi's father
- Marc Weiss as Yves, Léo's father
- Igor van Dessel as Charlie, Léo's older brother
- Léon Bataille as Baptiste, a classmate of Léo and Rémi

== Production ==
"When I read these testimonies of these 150 boys that aren't necessarily queer, I realized that making it only about a queer experience would limit it to that. [...] While it is not only about a queer experience, it's about the young male experience, because young men are not given that space to express themselves in that way. It gives you a place as an audience to interpret that experience as you want. But it's not about their sexuality, it's about how their intimacy and their sensuality are looked upon and how we are conditioned to look at it. How we want to compartmentalize everyone into boxes and labels and how we want to put a stamp on that love, and not let that love just exist in its true free form."

— Los Angeles Times' Lukas Dhont explained the meaning of Deep Secrets for the writing process of the film.

On 19 December 2018, it was announced that Lukas Dhont was developing a follow-up feature film to his 2018 Cannes Film Festival award-winning directorial debut Girl. Co-writer Angelo Tijssens and producer Dirk Impens were attached to re-team with Dhont for the then-untitled film, with Dhont stating that "It's going to be different but also in the style of Girl", and that "At the centre of it is a queer character." In writing the film, Dhont was inspired by psychologist Niobe Way's book, Deep Secrets: Boys' Friendships and the Crisis of Connection, which documents her study of intimacy among teenage boys. Dhont named the film after a "close friendship," a recurring term in the book.

There were no further developments until 23 July 2020, when it was announced that Dhont had set up an open casting call for the two male lead roles, set to be played by amateur actors, with casting scheduled to take place at the end of August. In addition, filming was scheduled to start the following summer. The casting call was open to speakers of both French and Dutch, and Dhont decided to film it in French after casting. On 20 October 2020, it was announced that the film would be titled Close and that international sales agent The Match Factory had joined the project. Dhont's brother Michael Dhont was also attached to production. On 29 June 2021, the film featured on Eurimages' annual list of co-production financing, with the fund supporting the film with €300,000.

Principal photography began on 9 July 2021. Alongside the start of production, it was also announced that Émilie Dequenne and Léa Drucker were cast in main roles. Speaking about the film, Dhont said: "Three years after the overwhelming trip of Girl, it's incredibly good to be back on the set, with this hugely talented cast and crew, especially as this story is close to my heart."

== Release ==
=== Theatrical ===
Close had its world premiere in competition for the Palme d'Or at the Cannes Film Festival on 26 May 2022, where it earned a 10-minute standing ovation and was later awarded the Grand Prix. It also played in the Official Competition at the 69th Sydney Film Festival, where it won the Sydney Film Prize. The film was released in France on 1 November 2022 by Diaphana Distribution and in Benelux on 2 November by Lumière. It was released in the United States on 27 January 2023 by A24, following a limited one-week theatrical run in New York City and Los Angeles on 2 December 2022. At Cannes, streaming service Mubi acquired distribution rights for the United Kingdom, Ireland, Latin America, Turkey and India.

=== Home media ===
The film was released by Mubi on Blu-ray and DVD in the UK on 29 May 2023. Both releases feature Dutch and French audio tracks as well as English and Spanish subtitles. Bonus features include Q&As with Lukas Dhont, Angelo Tijssens and Joachim Trier. Both releases also include a set of six color film stills.

== Reception ==
=== Critical response ===
On the review aggregation website Rotten Tomatoes, Close holds an approval rating of 90% based on 154 reviews from critics, with an average rating of 8.3/10. The website's consensus reads, "So moving for a majority of its runtime that not even a manipulative ending can ruin the experience, Close is a tender and powerfully acted look at childhood innocence lost." On Metacritic, which uses a weighted average, the film holds a score of 81 out of 100 based on 34 reviews, indicating "universal acclaim".

The film impressed critics for Dhont's script and direction, whose cinematic technique, as well as narrative structure, was praised for its ability to deal with the theme of adolescence and coming out. Critics also praised the performances of the actors in the cast. The critic Peter Bradshaw, reviewing the film for The Guardian, gave it a score of 4/5, writing that the story told is "disturbing" in that however "wised-up teenagers probably are now about the language of relationships and LGBT issues; [...] the end of a friendship is devastating." He also finds in the relationship of the two protagonists the ability to be "outraged at what amounts to a disloyal capitulation to homophobia" since "none of the adult life experience to explain it away" exists. The journalist is also pleasantly impressed with the acting, calling De Waele and Dambrine "excellent" and Dequenne and Drucker "valuable appearances."

Leslie Felperin of The Hollywood Reporter calls the film a "heart-crushing but emotionally rich story in which "Dhont and his team know just how to turn up the emotional dials with stunning magic-hour lensing", finding, however, that the narrative is "just on the brink of overkill" on the externalization of feelings, although the director "keeps the brakes on just enough" to appease them. Robbie Collin, reviewing the film for The Daily Telegraph, gives it a score of 5/5, denoting the director's work as "flawless" as the scenes "are handled with a sure but feather-light touch", concluding that "Close is a great film about friendship, but perhaps an even greater one about being alone."

For the Italian press, Roberto Nepoti of la Repubblica divides the film's narrative into two moments, the first related to childhood in an "idyllic" atmosphere, while the second, related to adolescence, "veers to the dramatic by showing the evolution" of the protagonists, in which he denotes "the delicacy in dealing with the sensitive subject of sexuality when it is still immature and undefined." The journalist appreciates the "well-mastered" screenplay, appreciating the director's ability to do "symbolic work on the colors" surrounding the characters, although in the second half of the film Dhont "allows himself to be possessed by the temptation of the pathetic by overly soliciting the viewer's emotion."

In a poll by IndieWire of 75 critics at Cannes, Close was named the best film of the festival. Dhont shared the Grand Prix with Claire Denis' Stars at Noon. The film also won the Sydney Film Prize in June 2022 at the 69th Sydney Film Festival, with jury president David Wenham deeming the film "a standout" and calling it "a mature film about innocence" that "displayed a mastery of restraint, subtle handling of story, astute observations and delicate attention to finer details."

On 16 September 2022, the film was announced as Belgium's submission for the Academy Award for Best International Feature Film at the 95th Academy Awards, and made the December shortlist, before being nominated for the Academy Award on 24 January 2023.

=== Accolades ===
| Award | Date of ceremony | Category | Recipient(s) | Result | Ref. |
|---|---|---|---|---|---|
| Cannes Film Festival | 28 May 2022 | Palme d'Or | Lukas Dhont | Nominated | |
| Cannes Film Festival | 28 May 2022 | Grand Prix | Lukas Dhont | Won | |
| Cannes Film Festival | 28 May 2022 | Queer Palm | Lukas Dhont | Nominated | |
| Sydney Film Festival | 19 June 2022 | Sydney Film Prize | Close | Won | |
| Norwegian International Film Festival | 26 August 2022 | Norwegian Film Critics' Award | Close | Won | |
| Miskolc International Film Festival | 17 September 2022 | Emeric Pressburger Prize | Close | Nominated | |
| Miskolc International Film Festival | 17 September 2022 | CICAE Award | Close | Won | |
| Hamptons International Film Festival | 15 October 2022 | Narrative Feature | Close | Won | |
| Mill Valley Film Festival | 18 October 2022 | Audience Favorite - World Cinema (Non-English Language) | Close | Won | |
| Chicago International Film Festival | 21 October 2022 | Gold Hugo | Close | Nominated | |
| Chicago International Film Festival | 21 October 2022 | Silver Hugo Jury Award | Close | Won | |
| Chicago International Film Festival | 21 October 2022 | Gold Q-Hugo | Close | Won | |
| Montclair Film Festival | 30 October 2022 | Special Junior Jury Award for Performance | Eden Dambrine | Won | |
| Seville European Film Festival | 12 November 2022 | Golden Giraldillo | Close | Nominated | |
| Seville European Film Festival | 12 November 2022 | Golden Jury Award | Close | Won | |
| Seville European Film Festival | 12 November 2022 | Best Actor | Eden Dambrine | Won | |
| British Independent Film Awards | 4 December 2022 | Best International Independent Film | Lukas Dhont, Angelo Tijssens, Michiel Dhont, Dirk Impens | Nominated | |
| National Board of Review | 8 December 2022 | Best International Film | Close | Won | |
| European Film Awards | 10 December 2022 | Best Film | Close | Nominated | |
| European Film Awards | 10 December 2022 | Best Director | Lukas Dhont | Nominated | |
| European Film Awards | 10 December 2022 | Best Screenwriter | Lukas Dhont and Angelo Tijssens | Nominated | |
| European Film Awards | 10 December 2022 | Best Actor | Eden Dambrine | Nominated | |
| European Film Awards | 10 December 2022 | European University Film Award | Close | Nominated | |
| European Film Awards | 27 June 2023 | LUX European Audience Film Award | Close | Won | |
| Washington D.C. Area Film Critics Association | 12 December 2022 | Best International/Foreign Language Film | Close | Nominated | |
| Chicago Film Critics Association | 14 December 2022 | Best Foreign Language Film | Close | Nominated | |
| St. Louis Gateway Film Critics Association | 18 December 2022 | Best International Film | Close | Nominated | |
| Dallas–Fort Worth Film Critics Association | 19 December 2022 | Best Foreign Language Film | Close | Runner-up | |
| Belgian Film Critics Association | 20 December 2022 | Grand Prix | Close | Nominated | |
| Belgian Film Critics Association | 20 December 2022 | André Cavens Award for Best Film | Close | Won | |
| San Diego Film Critics Society | 6 January 2023 | Best International Film | Close | Nominated | |
| San Francisco Bay Area Film Critics Circle | 9 January 2023 | Best International Feature Film | Close | Nominated | |
| Austin Film Critics Association | 10 January 2023 | Best International Film | Close | Nominated | |
| Golden Globe Awards | 10 January 2023 | Best Motion Picture – Foreign Language | Close | Nominated | |
| Georgia Film Critics Association | 13 January 2023 | Best International Film | Close | Nominated | |
| Critics' Choice Movie Awards | 15 January 2023 | Best Foreign Language Film | Close | Nominated | |
| Palm Springs International Film Festival | 16 January 2023 | Best International Feature Film | Close | Nominated | |
| Ensor Awards | 4 February 2023 | Best Sound | Vincent Sinceretti & Yanna Soentjens | Won | |
| Ensor Awards | 4 February 2023 | Best Original Score | Valentin Hadjadj | Nominated | |
| Ensor Awards | 4 February 2023 | Best Screenplay | Lukas Dhont and Angelo Tijssens | Won | |
| Ensor Awards | 4 February 2023 | Best Production Design | Eve Martin | Nominated | |
| Ensor Awards | 4 February 2023 | Best Costume Design | Manu Verschueren | Nominated | |
| Ensor Awards | 4 February 2023 | Best Director | Lukas Dhont | Won | |
| Ensor Awards | 4 February 2023 | Best Cinematography | Frank van den Eeden | Won | |
| Ensor Awards | 4 February 2023 | Best Editing | Alain Dessauvage | Nominated | |
| Ensor Awards | 4 February 2023 | Outstanding Performance in a Leading Role | Eden Dambrine | Won | |
| Ensor Awards | 4 February 2023 | Outstanding Performance in a Supporting Role | Gustav De Waele | Nominated | |
| Ensor Awards | 4 February 2023 | Outstanding Performance in a Supporting Role | Émilie Dequenne | Nominated | |
| Ensor Awards | 4 February 2023 | Outstanding Performance in a Supporting Role | Léa Drucker | Nominated | |
| Ensor Awards | 4 February 2023 | Best Film | Close | Won | |
| Houston Film Critics Society | 18 February 2023 | Best Foreign Language Feature | Close | Nominated | |
| César Awards | 24 February 2023 | Best Foreign Film | Close | Nominated | |
| Hollywood Critics Association Awards | 24 February 2023 | Best International Film | Close | Nominated | |
| Satellite Awards | 3 March 2023 | Best Motion Picture – International | Close | Nominated | |
| Satellite Awards | 3 March 2023 | Best Original Screenplay | Lukas Dhont and Angelo Tijssens | Nominated | |
| Magritte Awards | 4 March 2023 | Most Promising Actor | Eden Dambrine | Won | |
| Magritte Awards | 4 March 2023 | Most Promising Actor | Gustav De Waele | Nominated | |
| Magritte Awards | 4 March 2023 | Best Supporting Actor | Igor Van Dessel | Won | |
| Magritte Awards | 4 March 2023 | Best Supporting Actress | Émilie Dequenne | Won | |
| Magritte Awards | 4 March 2023 | Best Original Screenplay | Lukas Dhont and Angelo Tijssens | Won | |
| Magritte Awards | 4 March 2023 | Best Flemish Film | Close | Won | |
| Magritte Awards | 4 March 2023 | Best Cinematography | Frank van den Eeden | Won | |
| Magritte Awards | 4 March 2023 | Best Production Design | Eve Martin | Won | |
| Magritte Awards | 4 March 2023 | Best Costume Design | Manu Verschueren | Nominated | |
| Magritte Awards | 4 March 2023 | Best Editing | Alain Dessauvage | Nominated | |
| Dublin International Film Festival | 4 March 2023 | Dublin Film Critics Circle Award for Best Actor | Eden Dambrine | Won | |
| Academy Awards | 12 March 2023 | Best International Feature Film | Belgium | Nominated | |
| Robert Awards | 3 February 2024 | Best Non-English Language Film | Close | Won | |
| Gaudí Awards | 4 February 2024 | Best European Film | Close | Nominated | |
| Polish Film Awards | 4 March 2024 | Best European Film | Close | Nominated | |
| Bodil Awards | 16 March 2024 | Best Non-English Language Film | Close | Won | |

== See also ==
- List of submissions to the 95th Academy Awards for Best International Feature Film
- List of Belgian submissions for the Academy Award for Best International Feature Film
