= Chicago Film Critics Association Award for Best Costume Design =

Annual US film award

The Chicago Film Critics Association Award for Best Costume Design is one of several categories presented by the Chicago Film Critics Association (CFCA), an association of professional film critics, who work in print, broadcast and online media, based in Chicago. Since the 32nd Chicago Film Critics Association Awards (2019), the award has been presented annually. The first Chicago Film Critics Association Award for Best Costume Design went to Jacqueline Durran for her work on Little Women. The most recent recipient of this award is Jenny Beavan for the film Furiosa: A Mad Max Saga. British costume designer Jacqueline Durran has the most nominations (3) and the most wins (2). Jenny Beavan has two nominations and one win. Jacqueline West has three nominations, but no wins. Both Ruth E. Carter and Linda Muir have two nominations, but no wins. Alexandra Byrne, Shirley Kurata, and Holly Waddington have one win from one nomination.

== Winners and nominees ==
Year	Film	Costume designer(s)	Ref.
2019	Little Women	Jacqueline Durran	
2019	Dolemite Is My Name	Ruth E. Carter	
2019	Once Upon a Time in Hollywood	Arianne Phillips	
2019	Portrait of a Lady on Fire	Dorothée Guiraud	
2019	Rocketman	Julian Day	
2020	Emma	Alexandra Byrne	
2020	Birds of Prey	Erin Benach	
2020	First Cow	April Napier	
2020	Ma Rainey's Black Bottom	Ann Roth	
2020	Mank	Trish Summerville	
2021	Spencer	Jacqueline Durran	
2021	Cruella	Jenny Beavan	
2021	Dune	Robert Morgan and Jacqueline West	
2021	The Green Knight	Malgosia Turzanska	
2021	West Side Story	Paul Tazewell	
2022	Everything Everywhere All at Once	Shirley Kurata	
2022	Babylon	Mary Zophres	
2022	Black Panther: Wakanda Forever	Ruth E. Carter	
2022	Corsage	Monika Buttinger	
2022	The Northman	Linda Muir	
2023	Poor Things	Holly Waddington	
2023	Asteroid City	Milena Canonero	
2023	Barbie	Jacqueline Durran	
2023	Killers of the Flower Moon	Jacqueline West	
2023	Priscilla	Stacey Battat	
2024	Furiosa: A Mad Max Saga	Jenny Beavan	
2024	Dune: Part Two	Jacqueline West	
2024	Maria	Massimo Cantini Parrini	
2024	Nosferatu	Linda Muir	
2024	Wicked	Paul Tazewell	
