= Eden Dambrine =

Belgian child actor (born 2007)

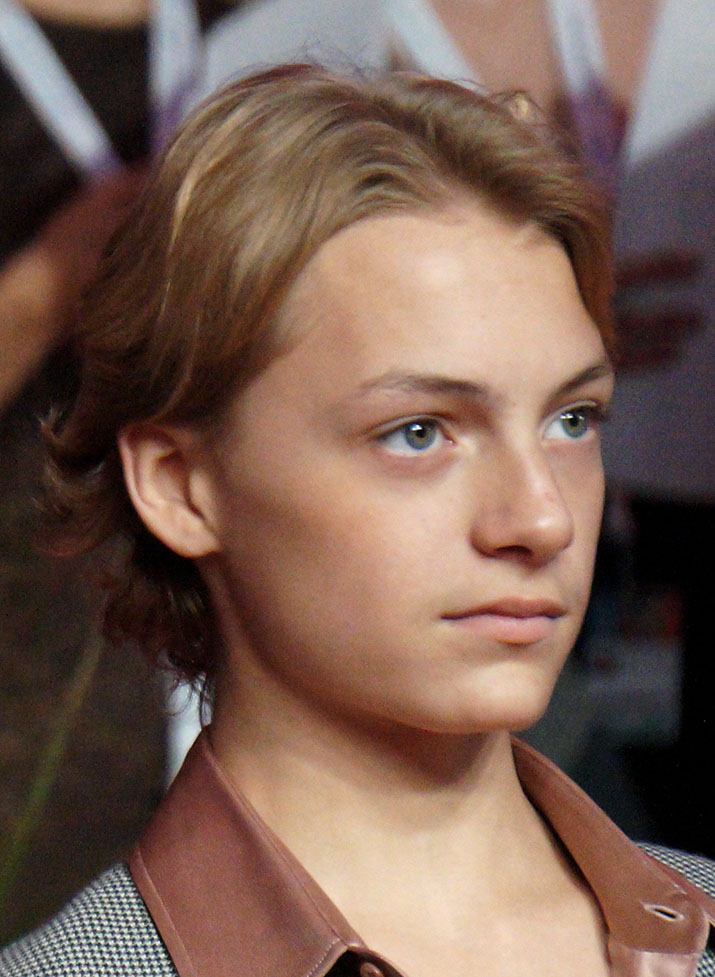
- Eden Dambrine (2022)
- Born: January 26, 2007 (age 19); Villeneuve-d'Ascq, Hauts-de-France, France
- Years active: 2022-present
- Notable work: Close

Eden Dambrine (born 26 January 2007) is a Belgian child actor.

== Career ==
At 15 years old, Dambrine starred in the coming-of-age drama film Close (2022) directed by Lukas Dhont as the film's protagonist Léo. Dambrine auditioned after meeting Dhont on a train ride who invited him to the casting. The film premiered at the 2022 Cannes Film Festival where it won the Grand Prix prize and received critical acclaim. The film also found international acclaim, being nominated at the 95th Academy Awards for the Academy Award for Best International Feature Film.

=== Film ===
Film appearances
Year	Title	Role	Ref.
2022	Close	Léo	

== Accolades ==
Award	Year (Note: Indicates the year of ceremony. Each year is linked to the article about the awards held that year, wherever possible.)	Category	Work	Result	Ref.
CinEuphoria Awards	2024	Best Actor	Close	Nominated	
CinEuphoria Awards	2024	Best Ensemble (shared with cast)	Close	Nominated	
CinEuphoria Awards	2024	Best Duo (shared with Gustav De Waele)	Close	Won	
Dublin International Film Festival	2023	Best Actor	Close	Won	
European Film Awards	2022	Best Actor	Close	Nominated	
Filmfestival Oostende	2023	Best Leading Performance	Close	Nominated	
International Cinephile Society	2023	Best Breakthrough Performance	Close	Nominated	
Magritte Awards	2023	Most Promising Actor	Close	Won	
Montclair Film Festival	2022	Best Performance	Close	Won	
Online Film & Television Association	2023	Best Youth Performance	Close	Nominated	
Seattle Film Critics Society	2022	Best Youth Performance	Close	Nominated	
Seville European Film Festival	2022	Best Actor	Close	Nominated	
