= Chicago Film Critics Association Award for Best Film =

Annual film award

The Chicago Film Critics Association Award for Best Film is one of the annual awards given by the Chicago Film Critics Association.

== Winners ==
=== 1980s ===
Year	Winner	Director(s)
1988	Mississippi Burning	Alan Parker
1989	Do the Right Thing	Spike Lee
1989	Batman	Tim Burton
1989	Born on the Fourth of July	Oliver Stone
1989	Crimes and Misdemeanors	Woody Allen
1989	Drugstore Cowboy	Gus Van Sant
1989	A Dry White Season	Euzhan Palcy
1989	Henry V	Kenneth Branagh
1989	Sex, Lies, and Videotape	Steven Soderbergh

=== 1990s ===
Year	Winner and nominees	Director(s)
1990	Goodfellas	Martin Scorsese
1991	The Silence of the Lambs	Jonathan Demme
1991	Barton Fink	Joel Coen
1991	Beauty and the Beast	Gary Trousdale and Kirk Wise
1991	Boyz n the Hood	John Singleton
1991	Thelma & Louise	Ridley Scott
1992	Malcolm X	Spike Lee
1992	The Crying Game	Neil Jordan
1992	The Player	Robert Altman
1992	Reservoir Dogs	Quentin Tarantino
1992	Unforgiven	Clint Eastwood
1993	Schindler's List	Steven Spielberg
1993	The Fugitive	Andrew Davis
1993	The Piano	Jane Campion
1993	Short Cuts	Robert Altman
1994	Hoop Dreams	Steve James
1994	Forrest Gump	Robert Zemeckis
1994	Pulp Fiction	Quentin Tarantino
1994	Quiz Show	Robert Redford
1994	The Shawshank Redemption	Frank Darabont
1995	Apollo 13	Ron Howard
1995	Crumb	Terry Zwigoff
1995	Exotica	Atom Egoyan
1995	Heat	Michael Mann
1995	Nixon	Oliver Stone
1996	Fargo	Joel Coen
1996	Dead Man	Jim Jarmusch
1996	The English Patient	Anthony Minghella
1996	The People vs. Larry Flynt	Miloš Forman
1996	Secrets & Lies	Mike Leigh
1997	L.A. Confidential	Curtis Hanson
1997	As Good as It Gets	James L. Brooks
1997	Boogie Nights	Paul Thomas Anderson
1997	The Sweet Hereafter	Atom Egoyan
1997	Titanic	James Cameron
1998	Saving Private Ryan	Steven Spielberg
1998	The Butcher Boy	Neil Jordan
1998	Life Is Beautiful	Roberto Benigni
1998	Shakespeare in Love	John Madden
1998	The Thin Red Line	Terrence Malick
1998	The Truman Show	Peter Weir
1999	American Beauty	Sam Mendes
1999	Being John Malkovich	Spike Jonze
1999	The Insider	Michael Mann
1999	Magnolia	Paul Thomas Anderson
1999	The Straight Story	David Lynch

=== 2000s ===
Year	Winner and nominees	Director(s)
2000	Almost Famous	Cameron Crowe
2000	Crouching Tiger, Hidden Dragon	Ang Lee
2000	Traffic	Steven Soderbergh
2000	Wonder Boys	Curtis Hanson
2000	You Can Count on Me	Kenneth Lonergan
2001	Mulholland Drive	David Lynch
2001	A Beautiful Mind	Ron Howard
2001	In the Bedroom	Todd Field
2001	The Lord of the Rings: The Fellowship of the Ring	Peter Jackson
2001	Waking Life	Richard Linklater
2002	Far from Heaven	Todd Haynes
2002	About Schmidt	Alexander Payne
2002	Adaptation.	Spike Jonze
2002	The Lord of the Rings: The Two Towers	Peter Jackson
2002	The Pianist	Roman Polanski
2003	The Lord of the Rings: The Return of the King	Peter Jackson
2003	American Splendor	Shari Springer Berman and Robert Pulcini
2003	Finding Nemo	Andrew Stanton
2003	Lost in Translation	Sofia Coppola
2003	Mystic River	Clint Eastwood
2004	Sideways	Alexander Payne
2005	Crash	Paul Haggis
2005	Brokeback Mountain	Ang Lee
2005	Good Night, and Good Luck.	George Clooney
2005	A History of Violence	David Cronenberg
2005	King Kong	Peter Jackson
2006	The Departed	Martin Scorsese
2006	Babel	Alejandro González Iñárritu
2006	Little Miss Sunshine	Jonathan Dayton and Valerie Faris
2006	The Queen	Stephen Frears
2006	United 93	Paul Greengrass
2007	No Country for Old Men	Joel Coen and Ethan Coen
2007	Into the Wild	Sean Penn
2007	Michael Clayton	Tony Gilroy
2007	Once	John Carney
2007	There Will Be Blood	Paul Thomas Anderson
2008	WALL-E	Andrew Stanton
2008	The Curious Case of Benjamin Button	David Fincher
2008	The Dark Knight	Christopher Nolan
2008	Milk	Gus Van Sant
2008	Slumdog Millionaire	Danny Boyle
2009	The Hurt Locker	Kathryn Bigelow
2009	Inglourious Basterds	Quentin Tarantino
2009	A Serious Man	Joel Coen and Ethan Coen
2009	Up in the Air	Jason Reitman
2009	Where the Wild Things Are	Spike Jonze

=== 2010s ===
Year	Winner and nominees	Director(s)
2010	The Social Network	David Fincher
2010	Black Swan	Darren Aronofsky
2010	Inception	Christopher Nolan
2010	The King's Speech	Tom Hooper
2010	Winter's Bone	Debra Granik
2011	The Tree of Life	Terrence Malick
2011	The Artist	Michel Hazanavicius
2011	The Descendants	Alexander Payne
2011	Drive	Nicolas Winding Refn
2011	Hugo	Martin Scorsese
2012	Zero Dark Thirty	Kathryn Bigelow
2012	Argo	Ben Affleck
2012	Beasts of the Southern Wild	Benh Zeitlin
2012	Lincoln	Steven Spielberg
2012	The Master	Paul Thomas Anderson
2013	12 Years a Slave	Steve McQueen
2013	American Hustle	David O. Russell
2013	Gravity	Alfonso Cuarón
2013	Her	Spike Jonze
2013	Inside Llewyn Davis	Joel Coen and Ethan Coen
2014	Boyhood	Richard Linklater
2014	Birdman	Alejandro G. Iñárritu
2014	The Grand Budapest Hotel	Wes Anderson
2014	Under the Skin	Jonathan Glazer
2014	Whiplash	Damien Chazelle
2015	Mad Max: Fury Road	George Miller
2015	Carol	Todd Haynes
2015	Inside Out	Pete Docter and Ronnie del Carmen
2015	The Revenant	Alejandro G. Iñárritu
2015	Spotlight	Tom McCarthy
2016	Moonlight	Barry Jenkins
2016	The Handmaiden	Chan-wook Park
2016	Jackie	Pablo Larraín
2016	La La Land	Damien Chazelle
2016	Manchester by the Sea	Kenneth Lonergan
2017	Lady Bird	Greta Gerwig
2017	Call Me by Your Name	Luca Guadagnino
2017	Dunkirk	Christopher Nolan
2017	The Shape of Water	Guillermo del Toro
2017	Three Billboards Outside Ebbing, Missouri	Martin McDonagh
2018	Roma	Alfonso Cuarón
2018	The Favourite	Yorgos Lanthimos
2018	First Reformed	Paul Schrader
2018	Hereditary	Ari Aster
2018	A Star Is Born	Bradley Cooper
2019	Parasite	Bong Joon-ho
2019	The Irishman	Martin Scorsese
2019	Little Women	Greta Gerwig
2019	Marriage Story	Noah Baumbach
2019	Once Upon a Time in Hollywood	Quentin Tarantino

=== 2020s ===
Year	Winner and nominees	Director(s)
2020	Nomadland	Chloé Zhao
2020	Da 5 Bloods	Spike Lee
2020	First Cow	Kelly Reichardt
2020	Lovers Rock	Steve McQueen
2020	Promising Young Woman	Emerald Fennell
2021	The Power of the Dog	Jane Campion
2021	Drive My Car	Ryusuke Hamaguchi
2021	The Green Knight	David Lowery
2021	Licorice Pizza	Paul Thomas Anderson
2021	West Side Story	Steven Spielberg
2022	The Banshees of Inisherin	Martin McDonagh
2022	Aftersun	Charlotte Wells
2022	Decision to Leave	Park Chan-wook
2022	Everything Everywhere All at Once	Dan Kwan and Daniel Scheinert
2022	Tár	Todd Field
2023	Killers of the Flower Moon	Martin Scorsese
2023	Barbie	Greta Gerwig
2023	May December	Todd Haynes
2023	Oppenheimer	Christopher Nolan
2023	Poor Things	Yorgos Lanthimos
2024	The Brutalist	Brady Corbet
2024	Anora	Sean Baker
2024	Furiosa: A Mad Max Saga	George Miller
2024	I Saw the TV Glow	Jane Schoenbrun
2024	Nickel Boys	RaMell Ross
2024	The Substance	Coralie Fargeat
2025	One Battle After Another	Paul Thomas Anderson
2025	Marty Supreme	Josh Safdie
2025	It Was Just an Accident	Jafar Panahi
2025	Sinners	Ryan Coogler
2025	Train Dreams	Clint Bentley

== See also ==
- Academy Award for Best Picture
