= Paul Rogers (film editor) =

American film editor

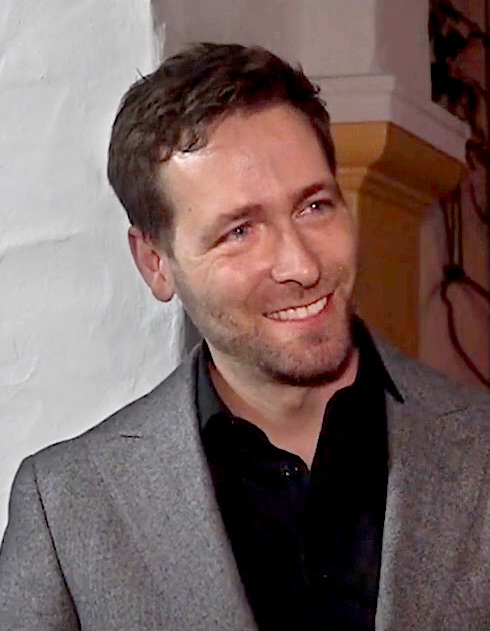
- Rogers in 2023
- Education: College at Santa Fe
- Occupation: Film editor
- Years active: 2015–present
- Notable work: Everything Everywhere All at Once
- Spouse: Becky Rogers
- Mother: Melissa Springer

Paul Rogers is an American film editor. He is best known as the editor of the 2022 film Everything Everywhere All at Once, which earned him a number of accolades, including the Academy Award for Best Film Editing and the BAFTA Award for Best Editing.

He attended Homewood High School and graduated from the College at Santa Fe as a film student.

He is married and thanked his wife (and his mother, photographer Melissa Springer) during his Academy Awards speech. In an interview with The Hollywood Reporter, Rogers advocated for a much greater work-life balance - especially one used by the Daniels. On October 16, 2023, Rogers appeared in an episode of Monograph, a PBS series dedicated to Alabamian artists.

== Filmography ==
=== Film ===
Year	Film	Director	Notes	Refs
2019	The Death of Dick Long	Daniel Scheinert		
2020	You Cannot Kill David Arquette	David Darg; Price James	Documentary	
2022	Everything Everywhere All at Once	Daniel Kwan; Daniel Scheinert	Austin Film Critics Association Award for Best Film Editing; Academy Award for Best Film Editing; BAFTA Award for Best Editing; Critics' Choice Movie Award for Best Editing; Independent Spirit Award for Best Editing; Online Film Critics Society Award for Best Editing; San Diego Film Critics Society Award for Best Editing; Satellite Award for Best Editing	
2025	The Legend of Ochi	Isaiah Saxon		

=== Television ===
Year	Film	Notes	Refs
2015	The Pound Hole	TV Pilot; directed by the Daniels	
2016	The Eric Andre Show	Season 4	
2017	Can't Stop, Won't Stop: A Bad Boy Story	TV Documentary	

== Personal life ==
Rogers has ADHD, especially during his childhood. After Rogers won his first Oscar, his mother Melissa Springer helped pass a resolution in Homewood, Alabama.
