= Shirley Kurata =

American stylist and costume designer (born c. 1970)

- Born: c. 1970 (age 55–56); Los Angeles, California, U.S.
- Occupations: Wardrobe stylist, costume designer
- Spouse: Charlie Staunton
- Website: shirleykurata.com

Shirley Kurata (born c. 1970) is an American wardrobe stylist and costume designer based in Los Angeles, California. In 2023, she was nominated for the Academy Award for Best Costume Design, for her work on the absurdist comedy-drama indie film Everything Everywhere All at Once.

Kurata has won numerous awards including the CDG Award for Excellence in Sci-Fi/Fantasy Film.

== Early life and education ==
Born in Los Angeles, Kurata grew up in the San Gabriel Valley, the youngest of four children. Her parents owned a laundromat. She is Japanese American, and has said that she was influenced by the "quirky and daring" fashions she saw in Japanese magazines.

Kurata bought her first pair of "fashion glasses" from L.A. Eyeworks when she was 18, and continues to wear their large round frames. At age 19, she left California to study fashion in Paris at Studio Berçot.

== Career ==
Early in her career, Kurata styled fashion shoots for photographer Autumn de Wilde, who went on to direct the 2020 feature film Emma.

Kurata's clients have included celebrities such as Billie Eilish, Lena Dunham, Pharrell Williams, Zooey Deschanel, Beck, Mindy Kaling, and Tierra Whack. She has styled collections for the Rodarte label by Americans Kate and Laura Mulleavy every year since its debut in 2006, and also styled collections for Danish-born, UK-based designer Peter Jensen, who called her the "muse" who inspired his 2016 spring collection.

In addition, Kurata has styled advertising campaigns for Kenzo and Oliver Peoples, and worked on short films for Prada and Miu Miu. In 2015, she opened Virgil Normal, a streetwear boutique in East Hollywood featuring gender-neutral clothing, with Charlie Staunton. In 2022, L.A. Eyeworks selected Kurata to model its new sunglasses collection, its first in a decade.

In 2019, she was a SCAD Style Mentor at Savannah College of Art and Design.

Kurata has characterized her own aesthetic as "futuristic folky".

=== Everything Everywhere All at Once ===
For Everything Everywhere All at Once, Kurata designed multiple looks for actors including Michelle Yeoh, Ke Huy Quan, Stephanie Hsu, and Jamie Lee Curtis, as their characters traveled from the "main" universe to other parts of the multiverse. For the film, Kurata was tasked with designing an extremely large number of costumes on a limited budget. Kurata has said that co-directors Daniel Kwan and Daniel Scheinert encouraged her to "Just go crazy, get creative", and that they aimed to create costumes that viewers would wear on Halloween.

According to The Hollywood Reporter, Kurata "subverted and reclaimed Asian-centric tropes" in styling the "outrageously outfitted personas" of Hsu's character, villain Jobu Tupaki, to whom Kurata has said she relates. Jobu Tupaki's many looks in the film include "Golfer Jobu" who wears a pink argyle vest and socks, exemplifying "the perfect Asian daughter who excels at sports and everything else in her life" according to Kurata. "Elvis Jobu", on the other hand, wearing an Elvis costume with pink hair and a cigarette, signals that she is antagonizing her mother. Another is "Goth Jobu", who wears an "all-black and a vinyl A-line miniskirt over a sheer tulle petticoat", which The Hollywood Reporter notes is "a twist on anime cosplay's Victorian doll-inspired Elegant Gothic Lolita." Yet another look is "Jobu K-Pop Star", influenced by K-pop and Harajuku street style.

CBS News said the film's "gravitas" would not have been possible "without the creative vision behind the film's amazing (and often universe-defying) costumes – Shirley Kurata". Insider observed that the film's costumes were "more than just clothes", since they convey "different iterations of each character" and "[place] the viewer in the numerous multiverses traversed throughout the film."

== Filmography ==
Year	Title	Role	Ref.
1999	The Murder in China Basin	Costume designer	
2000	Love & Sex	Costume supervisor	
2006	Alpha Dog	Lu	
2015	Seoul Searching	Costume designer	
2022	Everything Everywhere All at Once	Costume designer	
2025	Opus	Costume designer	
2026	I Love Boosters	Costume designer	

== Awards ==
Year	Award	Category	Nominated work	Result	Ref.
2022	Academy Awards	Best Costume Design	Everything Everywhere All at Once	Nominated	
2022	Chicago Film Critics Association	Best Costume Design	Everything Everywhere All at Once	Won	
2022	Costume Designers Guild	Excellence in Sci-Fi/Fantasy Film	Everything Everywhere All at Once	Won	
2022	Critics' Choice Movie Awards	Best Costume Design	Everything Everywhere All at Once	Nominated	
2022	Online Association of Female Film Critics	Best Costume Design	Everything Everywhere All at Once	Won (Note: Tied with Jenny Beavan, Mrs. Harris Goes to Paris)	
