= Chicago Film Critics Association =

Association of professional film critics

- Abbreviation: CFCA
- Formation: 1990
- Purpose: Film criticism
- Location: Chicago, Illinois
- Official language: English
- Website: www.chicagofilmcritics.org

The Chicago Film Critics Association (CFCA) is an association of professional film critics, who work in print, broadcast and online media, based in Chicago, Illinois, United States. The organization was founded in 1990 by film critics Sharon LeMaire and Sue Kiner, following the success of the first Chicago Film Critics Awards given out in 1988. The association comprises 60 members.

Since 1989, the CFCA has given out annual awards that recognize the best films in a variety of categories. These awards are noted in the established print media such as Variety and The Hollywood Reporter. The association has also hosted the annual Chicago Critics Film Festival since 2013, which intends to bring a number of feature and short films to a larger audience.

== Membership ==
The Chicago Film Critics Association restricts its membership to professional film critics, who have been employed in the media as a "critical voice or staff authority" on the subject of the cinema for six months. Applicants for membership in the CFCA must provide a letter signed by a producer or editor showing they have been in paid employment as a critic, as well as examples of published work. Applicants must also reside in the Chicago area. By 2004, the CFCA had just over 40 members and now comprises over 60.

Its membership includes writers for such film-related websites and print media as Ain't It Cool News, The A.V. Club, Chicago Sun-Times, Daily Herald, Consequence of Sound, Paste, RogerEbert.com and eFilmCritic.com.

== Chicago Film Critics Awards ==
Chicago Film Critics Association Awards
- Current: Chicago Film Critics Association Awards 2025
- Awarded for: achievement in film making and acting performances
- Country: United States
- Presented by: The Chicago Film Critics Association
- First award: 1988; 38 years ago
- Website: https://chicagofilmcritics.org/awards/

The Chicago Film Critics Awards (also known as the Chicago Flames) have been held annually since 1988 and recognise achievement in film making and acting performances. The first awards were compiled by the CFCA's founders and were not presented in a ceremony. In the past, winners received a glass Chicago Flame trophy, which featured an etching of the Chicago skyline created by artist Josef Puehringer. In 2019, following the death of longtime CFCA member Milos Stehlik, the organization's Most Promising Filmmaker award was renamed in his honor to the Milos Stehlik Award for Breakthrough Filmmaker.

=== Current award categories ===
- Best Actor
- Best Actress
- Best Adapted Screenplay (2006–)
- Best Animated Film (2007–)
- Best Art Direction (2012–)
- Best Cinematography (1990–93, 1995–)
- Best Costume Design (2019–)
- Best Director
- Best Documentary (2001–)
- Best Editing (2012–)
- Best Film
- Best Foreign Language Film
- Best Original Score (1993–)
- Best Original Screenplay (2006–)
- Best Supporting Actor
- Best Supporting Actress
- Best Use of Visual Effects (2019–)
- Milos Stehlik Award for Breakthrough Filmmaker (2019–)
- Most Promising Performer (2001–)

=== Previous award categories ===
- Most Promising Filmmaker (2001–2018)
- Best Screenplay (1990–2005)
- Most Promising Actor (1988–2000)
- Most Promising Actress (1988–2000)

== 20th Century Fox boycott ==
In 2007, the CFCA boycotted all 20th Century Fox and Fox Searchlight films, as part of a protest over the studio's decision to limit online critics' access to media screenings. A number of critics complained that the late media screenings affected the quality of their reviews. The CFCA's protest garnered support from many other film critics associations, including the Washington D.C. Area Film Critics Association and the San Francisco Film Critics Circle.

== Chicago Critics Film Festival ==
The Chicago Critics Film Festival was founded in 2013 and is held annually. It is the only film festival in the country that is entirely programmed and produced by a film critics association. Of the decision to host a film festival, Erik Childress, the festival's producer and CFCA board member stated, "We really wanted to be a bigger part of the film discussion here in Chicago, and we wanted to bring the discussion about these films to the community. It was an idea that was floating out there until we had the means to pull it off. It's really expanded far beyond what we expected."

The inaugural event was held from April 12–14, 2013 at the Muvico Theater in Rosemont. The festival showcased over 20 films that would have had a low distribution in a bid to expose them to a larger audience. Films shown included The Spectacular Now and The Dirties. The event also featured Q&A sessions with directors William Friedkin and Sarah Polley. The second festival was expanded to a week, beginning May 9, 2014 at the Music Box Theatre.
