= 1st Hollywood Critics Association Creative Arts Film Awards =

Hollywood Critics Association Creative Arts Awards

1st Hollywood Critics Association Creative Arts Awards
- Date: February 24, 2023
- Official website: hollywoodcreative.org

Highlights
- Most awards: Babylon / Top Gun: Maverick (2)
- Most nominations: Everything Everywhere All at Once (6)

The 1st Hollywood Critics Association Creative Arts Awards, presented by the Hollywood Creative Alliance, took place on February 24, 2023. The winners were announced on the official HCA Facebook, Instagram and Twitter, while the 6th Hollywood Critics Association Film Awards took place on the same day at the Beverly Wilshire Hotel, Beverly Hills. The nominations were announced on the official HCA YouTube channel and app on December 8, 2022.

Everything Everywhere All at Once led the nominations with six, followed by The Batman and Top Gun: Maverick with five each. The former and Babylon won the most awards with two wins apiece.

A shortlist committee, led by Erik Anderson, AwardsWatch contributor and HCA member, was created and tasked with generating twelve category shortlists for the HCA Creative Arts Awards. Six more HCA members worked alongside Anderson to build and shape this year's shortlists. Once the lists were finalized, the shortlists were sent out to the HCA membership and were used to vote on this year's nominees.

== Winners and nominees ==
Winners are listed first and highlighted with boldface

| **Best Casting Director**: **Bret Howe and Mary Vernieu – Glass Onion: A Knives Out Mystery**; John Buchan and Jason Knight – Women Talking; Aisha Coley – The Woman King; Sarah Finn – Everything Everywhere All at Once; Bret Howe and Mary Vernieu – The Menu | **Best Cinematography**: **Claudio Miranda – Top Gun: Maverick**; Russell Carpenter – Avatar: The Way of Water; Greig Fraser – The Batman; Janusz Kamiński – The Fabelmans; Larkin Seiple – Everything Everywhere All at Once |
| **Best Costume Design**: **Ruth Carter – Black Panther: Wakanda Forever**; Jenny Beavan – Mrs. Harris Goes to Paris; Catherine Martin – Elvis; Gersha Phillips – The Woman King; Mary Zophres – Babylon | **Best Editing**: **Paul Rogers – Everything Everywhere All at Once**; Bob Ducsay – Glass Onion: A Knives Out Mystery; Eddie Hamilton – Top Gun: Maverick; A. Sreekar Prasad – RRR; Kim Sang-bum – Decision to Leave |
| **Best Makeup and Hairstyling**: **Adrien Morot, Judy Chin, and Annemarie Bradley – The Whale**; Michelle Chung and Anissa Salazar – Everything Everywhere All at Once; Naomi Donne, Mike Marino, and Zoe Tahir – The Batman; Camille Friend and Joel Harlow – Black Panther: Wakanda Forever; Shane Thomas, Mark Coulier, Jason Baird, and Louise Coulston – Elvis | **Best Marketing Campaign**: **Smile**; Black Panther: Wakanda Forever; Everything Everywhere All at Once; Nope; Top Gun: Maverick |
| **Best Production Design**: **Florencia Martin and Anthony Carlino – Babylon**; Hannah Beachler – Black Panther: Wakanda Forever; James Chinlund and Lee Sandales – The Batman; Dylan Cole, Ben Procter, and Vanessa Cole – Avatar: The Way of Water; Catherine Martin, Karen Murphy, and Bev Dunn – Elvis | **Best Score**: **Justin Hurwitz – Babylon**; Carter Burwell – The Banshees of Inisherin; Alexandre Desplat – Guillermo del Toro's Pinocchio; Michael Giacchino – The Batman; Hildur Guðnadóttir – Women Talking |
| **Best Sound**: **Mark Weingarten, James H. Mather, Al Nelson, Chris Burdon, and Mark Taylor – Top Gun: Maverick**; Christopher Boyes, Gwendolyn Yates Whittle, Dick Bernstein, Gary Summers, Michael Hedges, and Julian Howarth – Avatar: The Way of Water; Johnnie Burn and José Antonio Garcia – Nope; David Lee, Wayne Pashley, Andy Nelson, and Michael Keller – Elvis; Stuart Wilson, William Files, Douglas Murray, and Andy Nelson – The Batman | **Best Visual Effects**: **Joe Letteri, Richard Baneham, Eric Saindon, and Daniel Barrett – Avatar: The Way of Water**; V. Srinivas Mohan – RRR; Zak Stoltz, Ethan Feldbau, Benjamin Brewer, and Jeff Desom – Everything Everywhere All at Once; Ryan Tudhope, Scott R. Fisher, Seth Hill, and Bryan Litson – Top Gun: Maverick; Aaron Weintraub, Brian Leif Hansen, Georgina Hayns, and Ian Mackinnon – Guillermo del Toro's Pinocchio |

== Films with multiple wins ==
The following films received multiple awards:

| Wins | Film |
|---|---|
| 2 | Babylon |
| 2 | Top Gun: Maverick |

== Films with multiple nominations ==
The following films received multiple nominations:

| Nominations | Film |
|---|---|
| 6 | Everything Everywhere All at Once |
| 5 | The Batman |
| 5 | Top Gun: Maverick |
| 4 | Avatar: The Way of Water |
| 4 | Black Panther: Wakanda Forever |
| 4 | Elvis |
| 3 | Babylon |
| 3 | The Woman King |
| 2 | Glass Onion: A Knives Out Mystery |
| 2 | Guillermo del Toro's Pinocchio |
| 2 | Nope |
| 2 | RRR |
| 2 | Women Talking |

== See also ==
- 2nd Hollywood Critics Association TV Awards
- 6th Hollywood Critics Association Film Awards
- 5th Hollywood Critics Association Midseason Film Awards
