= Morot =

Morot is a surname. Notable people with the surname include:

- Adrien Morot (born 1970), Canadian makeup artist
- Aimé Morot (1850–1913), French painter
