= Judy Chin =

American makeup artist

Judy Chin is an Academy Award-winning American makeup artist, having won the Academy Award for Best Makeup and Hairstyling for The Whale in 2023 (sharing the award with Adrien Morot and Annemarie Bradley). With this win, she became the first woman of Asian descent to win the Academy Award in that category.

She worked for the New York City Opera for four years, where she learned to use pancake makeup.

== Selected film and television work ==
1989: The Unbelievable Truth
1998: Montana
2000: Requiem for a Dream
2000–2004: Sex and the City
2002: Life Without Dick
2002: Frida
2003: Coffee and Cigarettes
2003: House of Sand and Fog
2004: National Treasure
2005: The Ballad of Jack and Rose
2005: Broken Flowers
2006: The Fountain
2007: Across the Universe
2008: Smart People
2008: Jumper
2008: Sex and the City
2008: Synecdoche, New York
2008: The Wrestler
2009: Bored to Death
2010: Sex and the City 2
2010: Black Swan
2010: The Tempest
2011: The Playboy Club
2012: The Dictator
2013: Oz the Great and Powerful
2013: Muhammad Ali's Greatest Fight
2014: Noah
2014: Birdman
2014: While We're Young
2015: Irrational Man
2015: Bridge of Spies
2016: Pee-wee's Big Holiday
2016: Money Monster
2016: American Pastoral
2017: The Meyerowitz Stories
2017: Mother!
2017: Wonder
2017: The Post
2018: Maniac
2019: The Dead Don't Die
2019: Little Women
2020: Greyhound
2020: The Glorias
2021: tick, tick...boom!
2021: West Side Story
2022: The Whale

== Selected awards and nominations ==
2001: Nominated for an Emmy Award for Outstanding Makeup For A Series (non-prosthetic), for Sex and the City
2003: Nominated for an Emmy Award for Outstanding Makeup For A Series (non-prosthetic), for Sex and the City
2003: Nominated for a Hollywood Makeup Artist and Hair Stylist Guild Award for Best Period Makeup for a Feature Film, for Frida (sharing the nomination with Maryann Marchetti and John E. Jackson)
2003: Won a BAFTA Award for Best Makeup and Hair, for Frida (sharing the award with Beatrice De Alba, John Jackson, and Regina Reyes)
2011: Nominated for a BAFTA Award for Best Make-Up and Hair, for Black Swan (sharing the nomination with Geordie Sheffer)
2022: Nominated for a Hollywood Critics Association Creative Arts Award for Makeup and Hairstyling, for The Whale (sharing the nomination with Adrien Morot and Annemarie Bradley)
2022: Nominated for a BAFTA Award for Best Make Up & Hair, for The Whale (sharing the nomination with Adrien Morot and Annemarie Bradley)
2022: The Whale, which Chin among others worked on the makeup of, was nominated for Best Hair and Makeup at the Critics' Choice Movie Awards
2023: Won an Academy Award for Best Makeup and Hairstyling, for The Whale (sharing the award with Adrien Morot and Annemarie Bradley)
