= 5th Hollywood Critics Association Midseason Film Awards =

Hollywood Critics Association Midseason Film Awards

- Date: July 1, 2022
- Official website: hollywoodcreative.org

Highlights
- Best Picture: Everything Everywhere All at Once
- Most awards: Everything Everywhere All at Once (7)
- Most nominations: Everything Everywhere All at Once (8)

The winners of the 5th Hollywood Critics Association Midseason Film Awards, presented by the Hollywood Critics Association, were revealed on July 1, 2022, on the HCA's official Facebook, Instagram, Twitter, and YouTube pages.

The nominations were announced on June 28, 2022. Everything Everywhere All at Once received the most nominations with eight, followed by The Batman with six, and The Northman, Top Gun: Maverick and The Unbearable Weight of Massive Talent with four each.

Everything Everywhere All at Once also won the most awards, winning seven out of its eight nominations and every category it was eligible for, including Best Picture and Best Director (the Daniels).

== Winners and nominees ==
Winners are listed first and highlighted with boldface

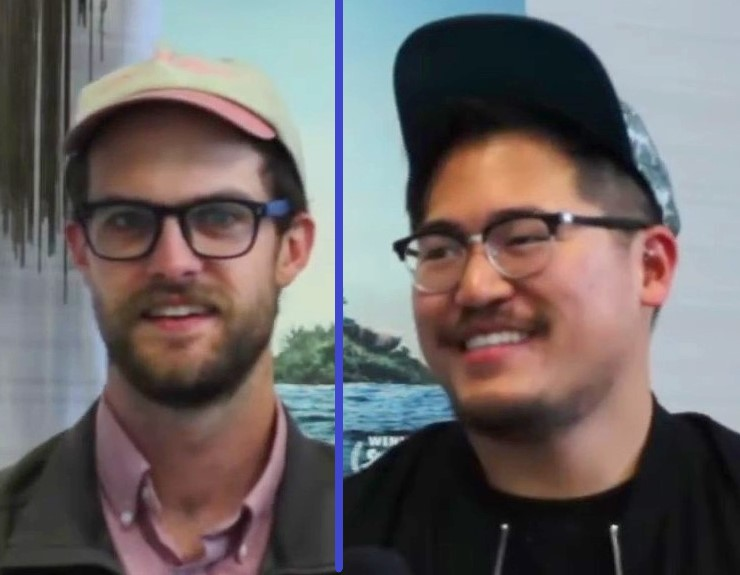
Daniel Scheinert and Daniel Kwan, Best Director and Best Screenplay winners

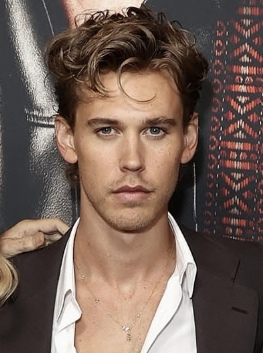
Austin Butler, Best Actor winner

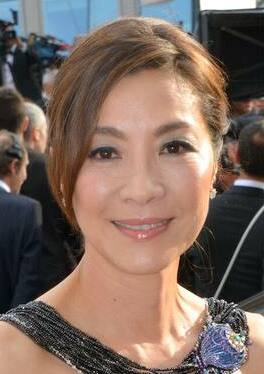
Michelle Yeoh, Best Actress winner

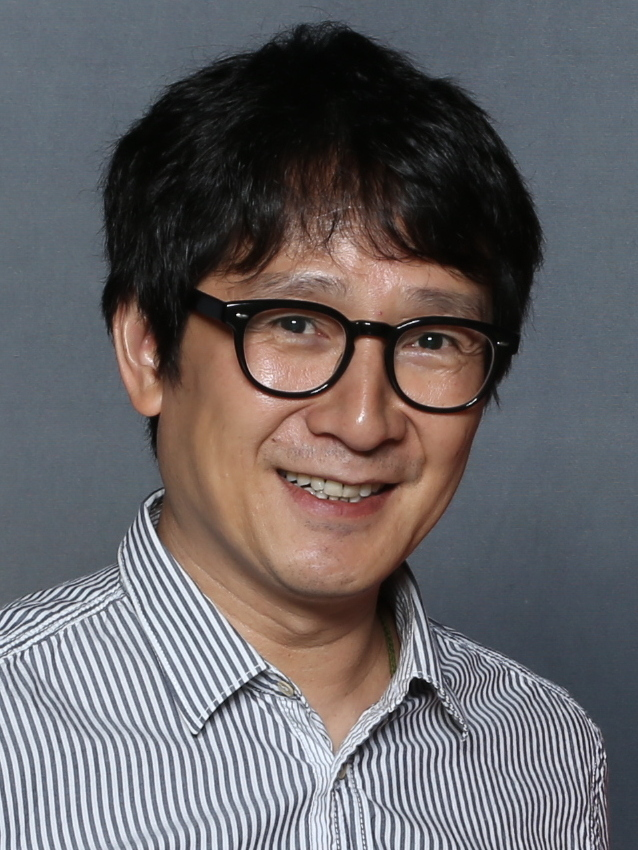
Ke Huy Quan, Best Supporting Actor winner

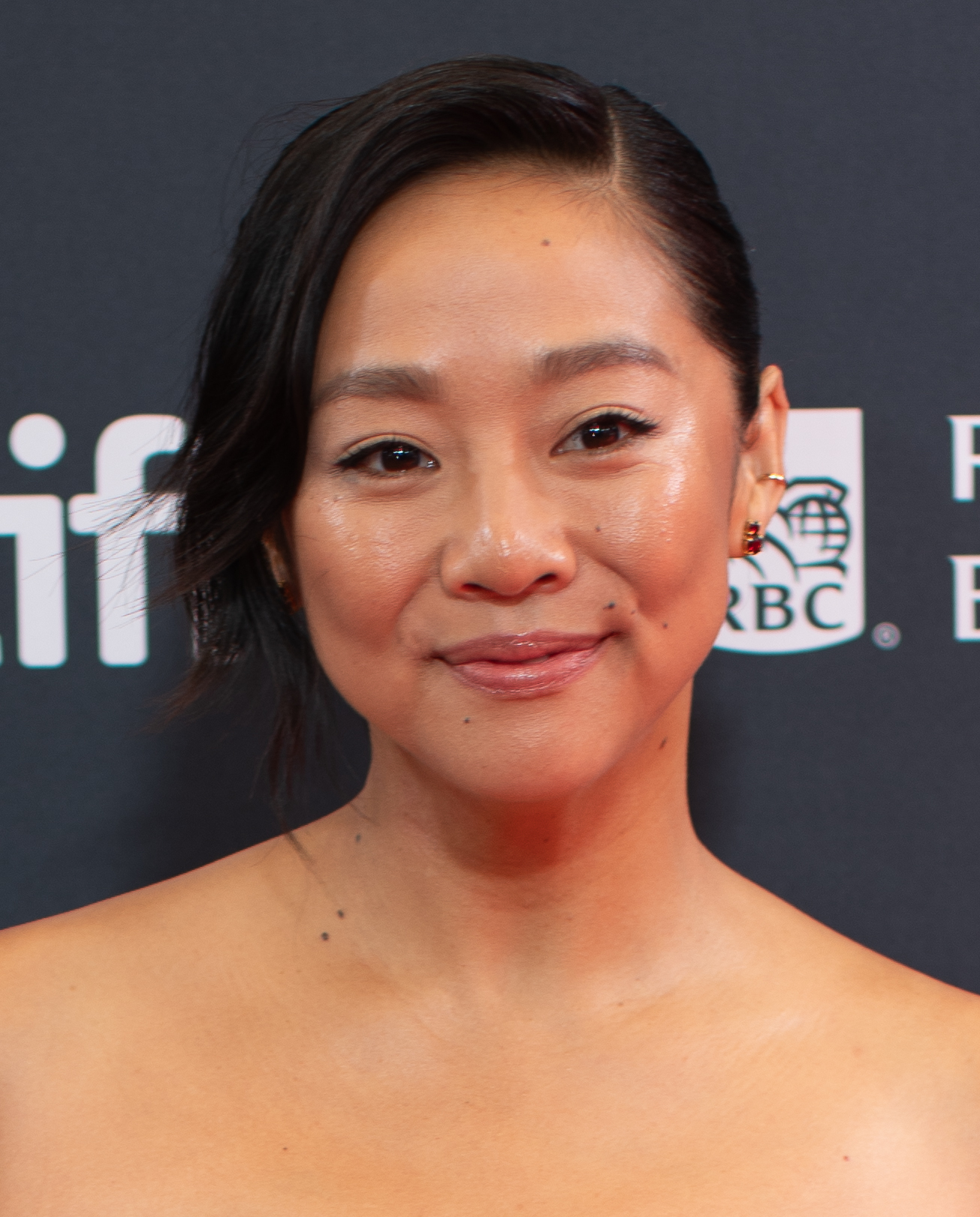
Stephanie Hsu, Best Supporting Actress winner

**Best Picture**: **Everything Everywhere All at Once**; Runner-up: RRR; The Batman; Cha Cha Real Smooth; Elvis; Marcel the Shell with Shoes On; The Northman; Top Gun: Maverick; Turning Red; The Unbearable Weight of Massive Talent	**Best Director**: **Daniel Kwan and Daniel Scheinert – Everything Everywhere All at Once**; Runner-up: Joseph Kosinski – Top Gun: Maverick; Baz Luhrmann – Elvis; Matt Reeves – The Batman; Robert Eggers – The Northman
**Best Actor**: **Austin Butler – Elvis as Elvis Presley**; Runner-up: Tom Cruise – Top Gun: Maverick as Captain Pete "Maverick" Mitchell; Alexander Skarsgård – The Northman as Amleth; Nicolas Cage – The Unbearable Weight of Massive Talent as Himself; Sebastian Stan – Fresh as Steve / Brendan	**Best Actress**: **Michelle Yeoh – Everything Everywhere All at Once as Evelyn Quan Wang**; Runner-up: Emma Thompson – Good Luck to You, Leo Grande as Nancy Stokes / Susan Robinson; Daisy Edgar-Jones – Fresh as Noa; Jenna Ortega – The Fallout as Vada Cavell; Mia Goth – X as Maxine Minx / Pearl
**Best Supporting Actor**: **Ke Huy Quan – Everything Everywhere All at Once as Waymond Wang**; Runner-up: Pedro Pascal – The Unbearable Weight of Massive Talent as Javi Gutierrez; Colin Farrell – The Batman as Oswald "Oz" Cobblepot / The Penguin; Miles Teller – Top Gun: Maverick as Lt. Bradley "Rooster" Bradshaw; Paul Dano – The Batman as Edward Nashton / The Riddler	**Best Supporting Actress**: **Stephanie Hsu – Everything Everywhere All at Once as Joy Wang / Jobu Tupaki**; Runner-up: Jamie Lee Curtis – Everything Everywhere All at Once as Deirdre Beaubeirdre; Anya Taylor-Joy – The Northman as Olga of the Birch Forest; Dakota Johnson – Cha Cha Real Smooth as Domino; Zoë Kravitz – The Batman as Selina Kyle / Catwoman
**Best Screenplay**: **Daniel Kwan and Daniel Scheinert – Everything Everywhere All at Once**; Runner-up: Tom Gormican and Kevin Etten – The Unbearable Weight of Massive Talent; Cooper Raiff – Cha Cha Real Smooth; Graham Moore – The Outfit; Matt Reeves and Peter Craig – The Batman	**Best Horror**: **Fresh**; Runner-up: X; The Black Phone; Master; Scream
**Best Indie Film**: **Everything Everywhere All at Once**; Runner-up: Marcel the Shell with Shoes On; After Yang; Emergency; X	**Most Anticipated Film**: **Nope**; Runner-up: Babylon; Avatar: The Way of Water; Don't Worry Darling; Killers of the Flower Moon

== Films with multiple wins ==
The following film received multiple awards:

Wins	Film
7	Everything Everywhere All at Once

== Films with multiple nominations ==
The following films received multiple nominations:

Nominations	Film
8	Everything Everywhere All at Once
6	The Batman
4	The Northman
4	Top Gun: Maverick
4	The Unbearable Weight of Massive Talent
3	Cha Cha Real Smooth
3	Elvis
3	Fresh
3	X
2	Marcel the Shell with Shoes On

== See also ==
- 2nd Hollywood Critics Association TV Awards
- 6th Hollywood Critics Association Film Awards
- 1st Hollywood Critics Association Creative Arts Film Awards
