= Annemarie Bradley =

American hairstylist

- Occupation: Hairstylist

Annemarie Bradley is an American hairstylist. She won an Academy Award in the category Best Makeup and Hairstyling for the film The Whale. Her win was shared with Adrien Morot and Judy Chin.

== Selected filmography ==
- The Whale (2022)

== Selected awards and nominations ==
2022: Nominated for a Hollywood Critics Association Creative Arts Award for Makeup and Hairstyling, for The Whale (sharing the nomination with Adrien Morot and Judy Chin)
2022: Nominated for a BAFTA Award for Best Make Up & Hair, for The Whale (sharing the nomination with Adrien Morot and Judy Chin)
2022: The Whale, which Bradley worked on the hairstyling of, was nominated for Best Hair and Makeup at the Critics' Choice Movie Awards
2023: Won an Academy Award for Best Makeup and Hairstyling, for The Whale (sharing the award with Adrien Morot and Judy Chin)
