= The Whale (2022 film) =

2022 American psychological drama film by Darren Aronofsky

- Theatrical release poster
- Directed by: Darren Aronofsky
- Written by: Samuel D. Hunter
- Based on: The Whale by Samuel D. Hunter
- Produced by: Jeremy Dawson; Ari Handel; Darren Aronofsky
- Starring: Brendan Fraser; Sadie Sink; Hong Chau; Ty Simpkins; Samantha Morton
- Cinematography: Matthew Libatique
- Edited by: Andrew Weisblum
- Music by: Rob Simonsen
- Production companies: A24; Protozoa Pictures
- Distributed by: A24
- Release dates: September 4, 2022 (Venice); December 9, 2022 (United States)
- Running time: 117 minutes
- Country: United States
- Language: English
- Budget: $3 million
- Box office: $57.6 million

The Whale is a 2022 American psychological drama film directed by Darren Aronofsky and written by Samuel D. Hunter, based on his 2012 play. The film stars Brendan Fraser, Sadie Sink, Hong Chau, Ty Simpkins, and Samantha Morton. The plot follows a severely obese, reclusive English teacher who tries to restore his relationship with his teenage daughter, whom he had abandoned eight years earlier. The film was shot from March 8 to April 7, 2021, in Newburgh, New York.

The Whale premiered at the 79th Venice International Film Festival on September 4, 2022 and received a polarized response. Although critics lauded the acting, particularly Fraser, Chau and Sink, the film's portrayal of obesity-related struggles drew criticism. Notwithstanding, it was received with acclaim in the awards season. At the 95th Academy Awards ceremony, The Whale won the Oscars for Best Actor (Fraser) and Best Makeup and Hairstyling, while Chau received a Best Supporting Actress nomination. At the 76th British Academy Film Awards, the film was nominated for Best Adapted Screenplay, Best Make Up & Hair, Best Supporting Actress (Chau) and Best Actor for Fraser's performance, who also received a nomination for Best Actor in a Motion Picture – Drama at the 80th Golden Globe Awards.

It had a limited theatrical release in the U.S. on December 9, before a wide release on December 21 by A24, grossing $57.6 million against a budget of $3 million.

== Plot ==
In early 2016, Charlie is a severely obese recluse in Moscow, Idaho. (Note: Confirmed by both Ellie's Facebook page and Alan's Bible, as well as dialogue confirming that the film is set in "Idaho". The play is also set in Moscow, Idaho.) Weighing 600 pounds (270 kg), he teaches online English writing courses with his webcam off, ashamed of his appearance. His nurse Liz brings him unhealthy food despite urging him to seek treatment for heart failure, which he claims he cannot afford. Each night he orders pizza from Dan, a delivery driver he has never met face-to-face.

Thomas, a missionary for the New Life Church, lets himself in during a supposed medical emergency and insists on helping Charlie. He learns Charlie hopes to reconcile with his estranged teenage daughter Ellie, abandoned eight years earlier when Charlie left his wife Mary for a male student, Alan, whose subsequent death left Charlie grief-stricken. Charlie offers Ellie his $120,000 savings if she will spend time with him; she agrees, on condition he completes her homework, though he also asks her to write honestly in a notebook he gives her. As his health deteriorates, Liz brings him a wheelchair.

When Thomas visits again, Liz angrily confronts him before revealing she is the adopted daughter of New Life's head pastor and Alan's sister; she explains that Alan's religious guilt drove him to suicide, and Charlie's grief led to his emotional eating. Thomas nonetheless remains convinced he must help Charlie. Ellie later drugs Charlie's food with crushed Ambien; when Thomas arrives, the two smoke marijuana together and he confesses to stealing from the church and fleeing his mission in Iowa, unaware Ellie is secretly recording him.

Liz brings Mary to visit. On learning how much Charlie has saved for Ellie, Liz storms out, furious at having been deceived about his refusal of treatment. Mary and Charlie argue over his choice to leave the family, and over Ellie's cruel behaviour, though Charlie insists he still hopes Ellie will prove he "did one thing right" in his life. After a delivery, Dan lingers to check on Charlie following a coughing fit and finally sees him—reacting with shock before fleeing. Humiliated, Charlie binge-eats severely and sends his students a furious profanity laden email dismissing their coursework and demanding they write him something honest instead.

Thomas returns to say he is going home: Ellie sent his confession to his church, and his family has forgiven him. He tries to quote Romans 8:13 to Charlie, but is thrown out after suggesting Alan's death was linked to his sexuality.

In his next class, Charlie tells his students he has been fired over the email, reads some of their honest responses, and finally switches on his webcam despite their mixed reactions. Declaring that only their honesty matters, not the coursework, he ends the session by throwing his laptop against the fridge.

As Liz comforts the dying Charlie, Ellie arrives furious about a failing grade on an essay she believes he rewrote—he had secretly submitted instead an essay she wrote in eighth grade about Moby-Dick, which he considers the most honest thing she has ever written. Though she initially rebuffs his final attempt at reconciliation, she reads the essay aloud at his urging. As she finishes, Charlie rises and walks toward her unaided; the two smile at each other as he begins to levitate, engulfed in bright white light.

== Cast ==
- Brendan Fraser as Charlie, a morbidly obese and reclusive English teacher.
- Sadie Sink as Ellie, Charlie's estranged daughter.
  - Jacey Sink as young Ellie.
- Hong Chau as Liz, a nurse and Charlie's only friend.
- Ty Simpkins as Thomas, a Christian missionary that befriends Charlie, Ellie, and Liz. He is based on Elder Thomas from the play.
- Samantha Morton as Mary, Charlie's ex-wife and Ellie's estranged mom.
- Sathya Sridharan as Dan, a pizza delivery man from the restaurant Gambino's which Charlie frequently orders from.

== Production ==
=== Writing and casting ===
Darren Aronofsky has said that he tried to get the film, an adaptation of Samuel D. Hunter's 2012 play The Whale, made for over a decade, but could not do it because he struggled to find the right actor to portray Charlie. After seeing portions of Brendan Fraser's performance in a trailer for Journey to the End of the Night (2006), he decided that Fraser could be a good choice.

The original play was set in 2009. However, the setting was updated to 2016 in the movie. This was because Hunter wanted to show the events as being before a major "seismic change", and doing so would make it clear that the play's events were prior to the COVID-19 pandemic. Within the film, the television shows the unfolding of the 2016 Republican Party presidential primaries. In the original play, Thomas, an Evangelical Christian missionary, is instead a Mormon missionary. The ethnic background or race of Liz was not specified in either the original play or the screenplay. Hong Chau, the actress chosen to portray Liz, is of Asian heritage. The final screenplay specifies that Liz was adopted as a way of accommodating Chau's casting; this was not in the initial revisions of the screenplay. Chau argued that Liz should have an unkempt look and should be tattooed, aspects that were incorporated into the character.

On January 11, 2021, it was announced that A24 had obtained global distribution rights to The Whale, directed by Aronofsky and starring Fraser. Chau, Sadie Sink and Samantha Morton joined the cast in February, followed by Ty Simpkins in March. Sathya Sridharan joined the cast at an unknown date.

At one point, the film was set to star James Corden with Tom Ford directing, but Ford left due to creative differences. George Clooney also briefly considered directing the film, but ultimately declined.

=== Filming ===
Principal photography ran from March 8 to April 7, 2021, in Newburgh, New York. It was shot in Academy ratio. Post-production began later in April.

For the role, Fraser spent four hours each day being fitted with prosthetics that weighed up to 300 pounds (136 kg). He also consulted with the Obesity Action Coalition and worked with a dance instructor for months before filming began in order to determine how his character would move with the excess weight.

Hunter stated that it is up to the viewer to interpret whether Charlie actually walks in the ending scene and Fraser argued that Charlie is finally "liberated". Sink stated that her character is emotionally traumatized and that Charlie is able to look through a façade that Ellie puts up as a barrier between herself and her father.

== Release ==
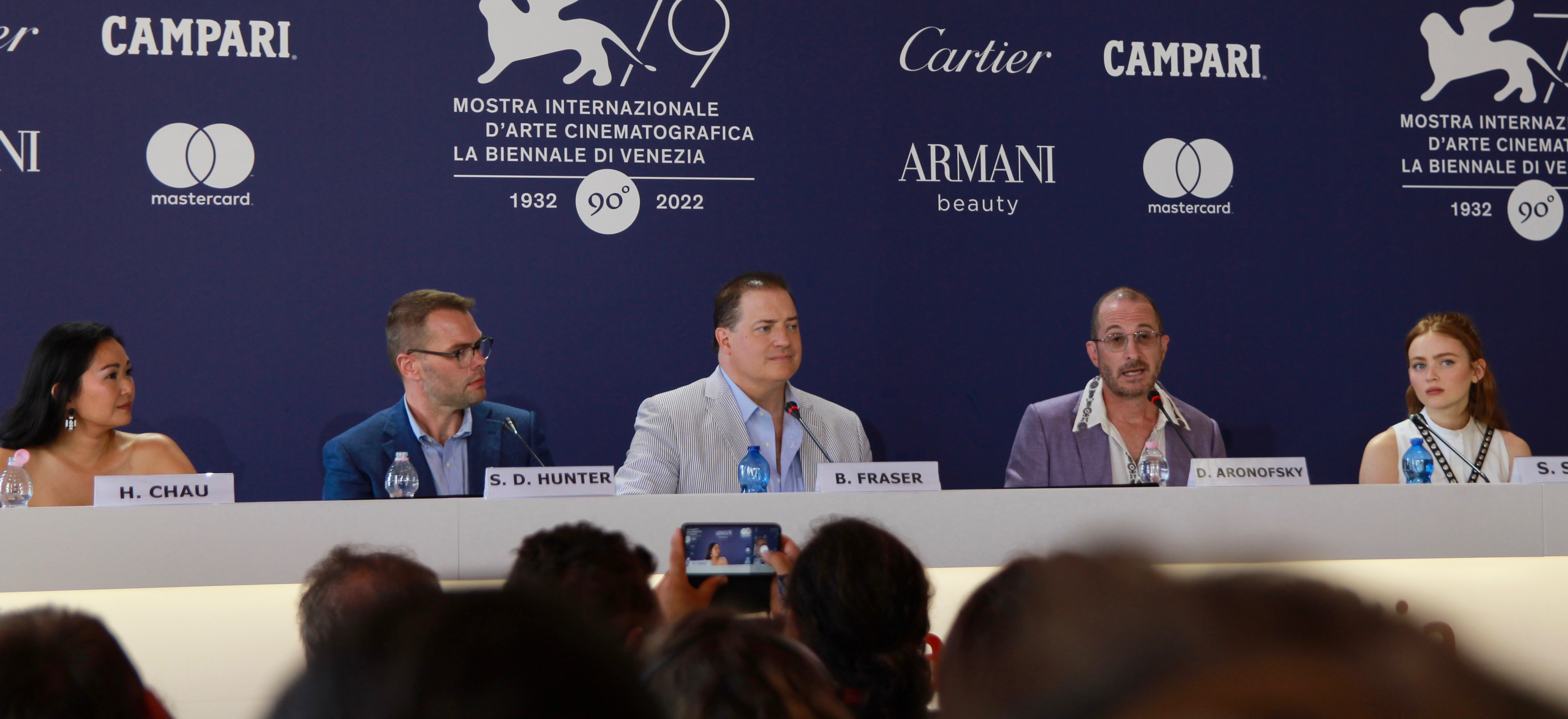
The cast, director and writer holding a press conference during the 2022 Venice Film Festival

The Whale had its world premiere at the 79th Venice International Film Festival on September 4, 2022, where it received a six-minute standing ovation. It made its North American premiere at the 2022 Toronto International Film Festival on September 11, 2022. It had a limited theatrical release in the United States on December 9, 2022, then expanded to wide release on December 21.

The film was released on VOD platforms on February 21, 2023, and was released on Blu-ray and DVD on March 14, 2023.

== Reception ==
=== Box office ===
The Whale grossed $17.4 million in the United States and Canada, and $39.5 million in other territories, for a worldwide total of $57.6 million.

After several weeks in limited release, the film grossed $1 million in its third weekend (expanding from six theaters to 603) and a total of $1.6 million over the four-day Christmas frame, then $1.4 million in its fourth weekend. It then expanded to 1,500 venues on the sixth week of its theatrical run and passed $11 million domestically, somewhat breaking the perceived ongoing trend that the general public was losing interest in prestige films in a moviegoing environment altered by the COVID-19 pandemic. These results were attributed to the praise and awards buzz for Fraser's performance.

=== Critical response ===
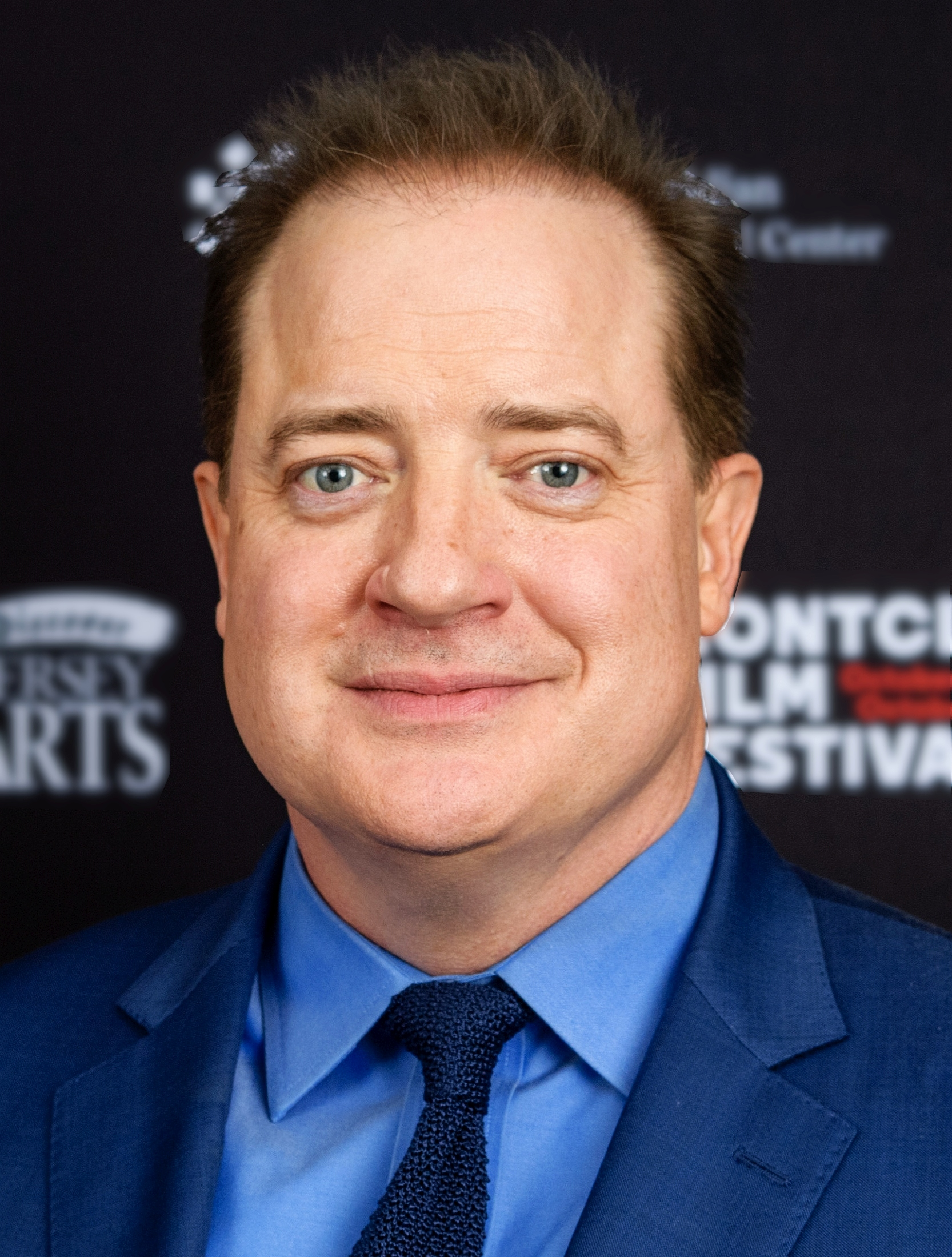
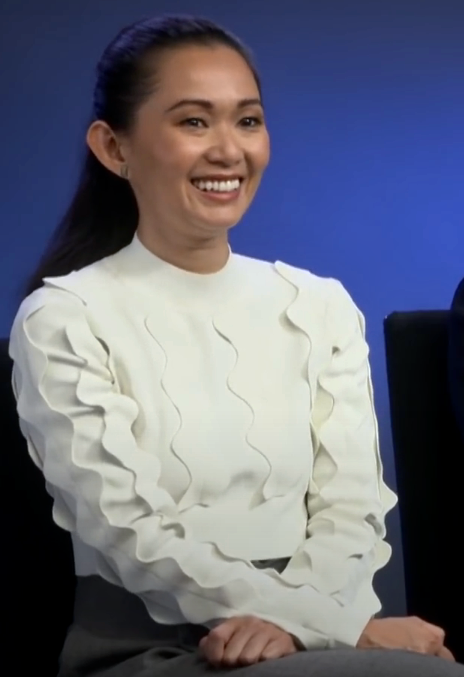
Brendan Fraser and Hong Chau garnered critical acclaim for their performances and earned Academy Award nominations for Best Actor and Best Supporting Actress, with Fraser winning.

Review aggregator website Rotten Tomatoes reported an approval rating of 64%, based on 347 reviews, with an average rating of 6.6/10. The site's critics consensus reads, "Held together by a killer Brendan Fraser, The Whale sings a song of empathy that will leave most viewers blubbering." Metacritic, which uses a weighted average, assigned the film a score of 60 out of 100, based on 57 critics, indicating "mixed or average" reviews. According to MovieWeb, the film polarized critics and audiences.

The Whale received positive feedback at the Toronto International Film Festival, with particular praise for Fraser's, Chau's and Sink's performances. When the film had a limited theatrical release, Variety reported that the reviews "have been polarizing, with others [than Variety's review] criticizing the film's portrayal of fat people". Glenn Kenny of RogerEbert.com praised Aronofsky's direction and Fraser's performance, writing that the "story is one of different levels of heartbreak and human misunderstanding" and "Aronofsky and Fraser have taken substantive risks, in the name of an insistent empathy." Robbie Collin of The Telegraph gave it a perfect five stars, writing: "Fraser seals his comeback in a sensational film of rare compassion."

Richard Roeper of the Chicago Sun-Times described the film as an "empathetic, haunting, beautiful, heartbreakingly moving story of a broken man". He named it best film of the year and deemed Fraser's performance as his career's best. Variety chief film critic Owen Gleiberman also praised Fraser, calling him "slyer, subtler, more haunting than he has ever been". Matthew Creith of Out Front wrote: "The highlight of The Whale comes from an outstanding turn from Hong Chau, who gives a memorable performance in a vital role that balances Charlie's outlandish behavior." Hannah Strong of Little White Lies praised Fraser and the "strong ensemble,” highlighting Sink's "tricky role" in which she "captures the anger and sadness that comes from parental abandonment", and stating that while Aronofsky "isn't a particularly empathetic filmmaker" and The Whale is not without flaws, the film "reflects tenderly on shame, guilt, and the human impulse to care and be cared for".

Richard Lawson of Vanity Fair wrote that the film is "meant to be a poignant consideration of guilt, sexuality, religion, remorse" but "we really only know that because the movie shouts it at us". He also criticized Fraser's performance as "lost". Mark Hanson of Slant Magazine felt that Aronofsky reins in his "typically ostentatious style", but that "considering how Libatique's camera leeringly treats Charlie as an unsightly object of pity throughout, it's difficult to deny the film's fatphobia, though its mawkishness is no less oppressive". Katie Rife of Polygon wrote: "If you look at The Whale as a fable, its moral is that it's the responsibility of the abused to love and forgive their abusers. The movie thinks it's saying 'You don't understand; he's fat because he's suffering.' But it ends up saying 'You don't understand; we have to be cruel to fat people because we are suffering.' Aronofsky and Hunter's biblical metaphor aside, fat people didn't volunteer to serve as repositories for society's rage and contempt." Mark Kermode gave the film a negative review. He said the film relies heavily on emotional manipulation to elicit a response from the audience. Kermode also commented that while Brendan Fraser's performance is commendable, the film's portrayal of obesity and its related struggles is problematic and lacks sensitivity.

The film has received criticism for its portrayal of the main character. Time magazine stated: "Some of the film's critics believe it perpetuates tired tropes of fat people as suffering, chronically depressed and binge eating." On the podcast Don't Let This Flop, Rolling Stone writer EJ Dickson said the film was criticized for its use of a prosthetic suit instead of casting a fat actor, with accusations that it "stigmatizes and mocks fat people". On NPR's culture section, Jaclyn Diaz reported that this criticism extends to detractors calling the film's premise "inherently dehumanizing".

Writing for The New York Times, Roxane Gay expressed her opinion that the film's empathy was only superficial and that the depiction of Charlie reinforced anti-fat stereotypes and preconceptions. She wrote that although Aronofsky said he wanted to give an empathetic portrayal she "was bewildered because an empathetic portrayal isn't at all what was conveyed onscreen. As I looked around the audience, I was struck by the fact that there were only four or so fat people in the audience and none on the stage."

Director Darren Aronofsky defended the film, saying the criticisms "make no sense". Aronofsky further said that "actors have been using makeup since the beginning of acting—that's one of their tools. And the lengths we went to portray the realism of the makeup has never been done before", adding that "people with obesity are generally written as bad guys or as punch lines, we wanted to create a fully worked-out character who has bad parts about him and good parts about him". He said of fat people that "they get judged everywhere they go on the planet, by most people. This film shows that, like everyone, we are all human".

=== Top ten lists ===
The Whale was on many critics' top ten lists for 2022.

- 1st – Richard Roeper, Chicago Sun-Times
- 2nd – Brian Truitt, USA Today
- 4th – Lauren Coates & Susan Wloszczyna, RogerEbert.com
- 5th – Carla Renata, RogerEbert.com
- 6th – Richard Whittaker, Austin Chronicle
- 6th – Jeff Sneider, Los Angeles Magazine
- 7th – Mike Scott, New Orleans Times-Picayune
- 9th – Peter Debruge, Variety
- 9th – Mick LaSalle, San Francisco Chronicle

=== Accolades ===
Awards and nominations for The Whale
Award	Date of ceremony	Category	Recipient(s)	Result	Ref.
AACTA International Awards	February 24, 2023	Best Actor	Brendan Fraser	Nominated	
AARP Movies for Grownups Awards	January 28, 2023	Best Actor	Brendan Fraser	Won	
Academy Awards	March 12, 2023	Best Actor	Brendan Fraser	Won	
Academy Awards	March 12, 2023	Best Supporting Actress	Hong Chau	Nominated	
Academy Awards	March 12, 2023	Best Makeup and Hairstyling	Adrien Morot, Judy Chin and Annemarie Bradley	Won	
Alliance of Women Film Journalists	January 5, 2023	Best Actor	Brendan Fraser	Nominated	
Alliance of Women Film Journalists	January 5, 2023	Best Actress in a Supporting Role	Hong Chau	Nominated	
Alliance of Women Film Journalists	January 5, 2023	Best Screenplay – Adapted	Samuel D. Hunter	Nominated	
Alliance of Women Film Journalists	January 5, 2023	Best Woman's Breakthrough Performance	Sadie Sink	Nominated	
Artios Awards	March 9, 2023	Studio or Independent – Drama	Lindsay Graham, Bret Howe and Mary Vernieu	Nominated	
Austin Film Critics Association	January 10, 2023	Best Actor	Brendan Fraser	Nominated	
Austin Film Critics Association	January 10, 2023	Best Adapted Screenplay	Samuel D. Hunter	Nominated	
British Academy Film Awards	February 19, 2023	Best Actor in a Leading Role	Brendan Fraser	Nominated	
British Academy Film Awards	February 19, 2023	Best Actress in a Supporting Role	Hong Chau	Nominated	
British Academy Film Awards	February 19, 2023	Best Adapted Screenplay	Samuel D. Hunter	Nominated	
British Academy Film Awards	February 19, 2023	Best Make Up & Hair	Adrien Morot, Judy Chin and Annemarie Bradley	Nominated	
Capri Hollywood International Film Festival	December 26, 2022 – January 2, 2023	Best Actor	Brendan Fraser	Won	
Chicago Film Critics Association	December 14, 2022	Best Actor	Brendan Fraser	Nominated	
Chicago Film Critics Association	December 14, 2022	Best Supporting Actress	Hong Chau	Nominated	
Cinema for Peace Awards	February 24, 2023	Cinema for Peace Dove for the Most Valuable Film of the Year	The Whale	Nominated	
Critics' Choice Awards	January 15, 2023	Best Actor	Brendan Fraser	Won	
Critics' Choice Awards	January 15, 2023	Best Young Actor/Actress	Sadie Sink	Nominated	
Critics' Choice Awards	January 15, 2023	Best Adapted Screenplay	Samuel D. Hunter	Nominated	
Critics' Choice Awards	January 15, 2023	Best Hair and Makeup	The Whale	Nominated	
Dallas–Fort Worth Film Critics Association	December 19, 2022	Best Picture	The Whale	7th place	
Dallas–Fort Worth Film Critics Association	December 19, 2022	Best Actor	Brendan Fraser	Runner-up	
Dallas–Fort Worth Film Critics Association	December 19, 2022	Best Supporting Actress	Hong Chau	Runner-up	
Denver Film Festival	November 2–13, 2023	Rare Pearl Award	Darren Aronofsky	Won	
Dorian Awards	February 23, 2023	Film Performance of the Year	Brendan Fraser	Nominated	
Dorian Awards	February 23, 2023	Supporting Film Performance of the Year	Hong Chau	Nominated	
Florida Film Critics Circle	December 22, 2022	Best Actor	Brendan Fraser	Runner-up (Note: Tied with Park Hae-il for Decision to Leave)	
Georgia Film Critics Association	January 13, 2023	Best Actor	Brendan Fraser	Runner-up	
Golden Globe Awards	January 10, 2023	Best Actor in a Motion Picture – Drama	Brendan Fraser	Nominated	
Golden Trailer Awards	June 29, 2023	Best Drama	"People" (Woollen & Associates)	Nominated	
Golden Trailer Awards	June 29, 2023	Best Independent Trailer	"People" (Woollen & Associates)	Nominated	
Golden Trailer Awards	June 29, 2023	Best Independent TV Spot	"Acclaim" (GrandSon)	Nominated	
Gotham Independent Film Awards	November 28, 2022	Outstanding Lead Performance	Brendan Fraser	Nominated	
Gotham Independent Film Awards	November 28, 2022	Outstanding Supporting Performance	Hong Chau	Nominated	
Hollywood Critics Association Awards	February 24, 2023	Best Actor	Brendan Fraser	Won	
Hollywood Critics Association Awards	February 24, 2023	Best Supporting Actress	Hong Chau	Nominated	
Hollywood Critics Association Awards	February 24, 2023	Best Adapted Screenplay	Samuel D. Hunter	Nominated	
Hollywood Critics Association Creative Arts Awards	February 24, 2023	Best Makeup and Hairstyling	Adrien Morot, Judy Chin and Annemarie Bradley	Won	
Hollywood Music in Media Awards	November 16, 2022	Best Original Score in an Independent Film	Rob Simonsen	Nominated	
Houston Film Critics Society	February 18, 2023	Best Actor	Brendan Fraser	Nominated	
Kansas City Film Critics Circle	January 22, 2023	Best Lead Actor	Brendan Fraser	Runner-up	
London Critics Circle Film Awards	February 5, 2023	Actor of the Year	Brendan Fraser	Nominated	
London Critics Circle Film Awards	February 5, 2023	Supporting Actress of the Year	Hong Chau	Nominated	
Make-Up Artists and Hair Stylists Guild	February 11, 2023	Best Special Make-Up Effects	Adrien Morot, Kathy Tse and Chris Gallaher	Won	
Mill Valley Film Festival	October 6–16, 2022	Audience Favorite – US Cinema	The Whale	Won	
Montclair Film Festival	October 21–30, 2022	Junior Jury Prize	The Whale	Won	
New York Film Critics Online	December 11, 2022	Best Supporting Actress	Hong Chau	Won	
Online Film Critics Society	January 23, 2023	Best Actor	Brendan Fraser	Nominated	
Palm Springs International Film Festival	January 5–16, 2023	Spotlight Award	Brendan Fraser	Won	
Producers Guild of America Awards	February 25, 2023	Outstanding Producer of Theatrical Motion Pictures	Jeremy Dawson, Ari Handel and Darren Aronofsky	Nominated	
San Diego Film Critics Society	January 6, 2023	Best Actor	Brendan Fraser	Nominated	
San Diego Film Critics Society	January 6, 2023	Best Adapted Screenplay	Samuel D. Hunter	Nominated	
San Francisco Bay Area Film Critics Circle	January 9, 2023	Best Actor	Brendan Fraser	Nominated	
San Francisco Bay Area Film Critics Circle	January 9, 2023	Best Adapted Screenplay	Samuel D. Hunter	Nominated	
Santa Barbara International Film Festival	February 8–18, 2023	American Riviera Award	Brendan Fraser	Won	
Satellite Awards	March 3, 2023	Best Actor in a Motion Picture – Drama	Brendan Fraser	Won	
Satellite Awards	March 3, 2023	Best Adapted Screenplay	Samuel D. Hunter	Nominated	
Screen Actors Guild Awards	February 26, 2023	Outstanding Performance by a Male Actor in a Leading Role	Brendan Fraser	Won	
Screen Actors Guild Awards	February 26, 2023	Outstanding Performance by a Female Actor in a Supporting Role	Hong Chau	Nominated	
Seattle Film Critics Society	January 17, 2023	Best Actor in a Leading Role	Brendan Fraser	Nominated	
Society of Composers & Lyricists Awards	February 15, 2023	Outstanding Original Score for an Independent Film	Rob Simonsen	Nominated	
St. Louis Film Critics Association	December 18, 2022	Best Actor	Brendan Fraser	Won	
Toronto Film Critics Association	January 8, 2023	Best Actor	Brendan Fraser	Runner-up	
Toronto International Film Festival	September 8–18, 2022	Tribute Actor Award	Brendan Fraser	Won	
Tromsø International Film Festival	January 16–22, 2023	Aurora Award	Darren Aronofsky	Nominated	
Venice Film Festival	August 31 – September 10, 2022	10th Interfilm Award for Promoting Interreligious Dialogue	Darren Aronofsky	Won	
Venice Film Festival	August 31 – September 10, 2022	Leoncino d'Oro Award	Darren Aronofsky	Won	
Venice Film Festival	August 31 – September 10, 2022	Premio CinemaSarà Award	Darren Aronofsky	Won	
Venice Film Festival	August 31 – September 10, 2022	Sorriso Diverso Venezia Award for Best Foreign Film	Darren Aronofsky	Won	
Venice Film Festival	August 31 – September 10, 2022	Golden Lion	Darren Aronofsky	Nominated	
Venice Film Festival	August 31 – September 10, 2022	Queer Lion	Darren Aronofsky	Nominated	
Washington D.C. Area Film Critics Association	December 12, 2022	Best Actor	Brendan Fraser	Nominated	
Washington D.C. Area Film Critics Association	December 12, 2022	Best Adapted Screenplay	Samuel D. Hunter	Nominated	
Washington D.C. Area Film Critics Association	December 12, 2022	Best Youth Performance	Sadie Sink	Nominated	
Women Film Critics Circle	December 19, 2022	Best Actor	Brendan Fraser	Won	
