= 6th Hollywood Critics Association Film Awards =

Hollywood Critics Association Film Awards

- Date: February 24, 2023
- Site: Beverly Wilshire Hotel, Beverly Hills
- Hosted by: Tig Notaro
- Official website: hollywoodcreative.org

Highlights
- Best Picture: Everything Everywhere All at Once
- Most awards: Everything Everywhere All at Once (6)
- Most nominations: Everything Everywhere All at Once (10)

Television coverage
- Network: KNEKT Television Network; YouTube (@HollywoodCreativeAlliance)

The 6th Hollywood Critics Association Film Awards, presented by the Hollywood Critics Association, took place on the evening of February 24, 2023, at the Beverly Wilshire Hotel, Beverly Hills, while the winners of the 1st Hollywood Critics Association Creative Arts Film Awards were announced earlier that day via social media platforms. The nominations for both events were announced on the HCA official YouTube channel and app on December 8 and December 15, 2022, respectively; Jalyn Hall, Jude Hill, and Madeleine McGraw announced the December 15 nominations.

Everything Everywhere All at Once led the nominations with ten, followed by The Banshees of Inisherin with seven. The former also received six HCA Creative Arts Awards nominations, bringing the film's total to 16 nominations. Everything Everywhere All at Once ultimately won the most awards with six wins, including Best Picture and Best Director (the Daniels); plus, one Creative Arts Award: Best Editing.

The ceremony was broadcast live on KNEKT Television Network, and streamed live on the official HCA YouTube channel and app. Comedian Tig Notaro hosted the ceremony.

== Winners and nominees ==
Winners are listed first and highlighted with boldface.

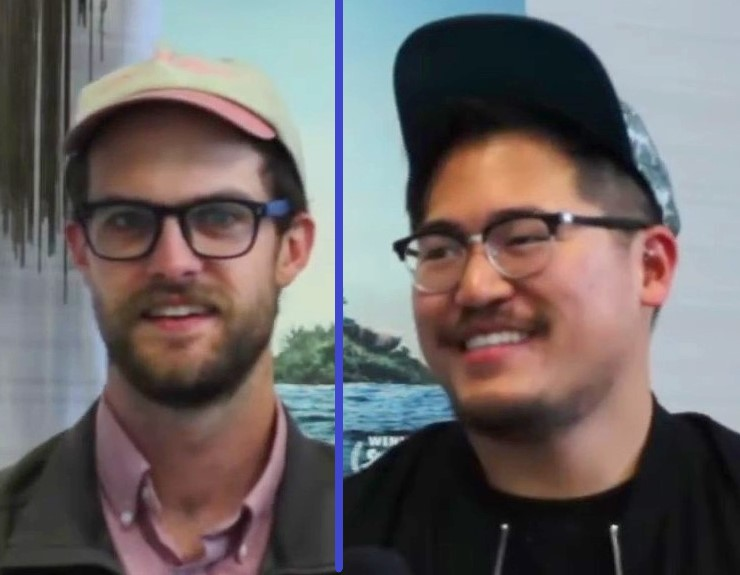
Daniel Scheinert and Daniel Kwan, Best Director and Best Original Screenplay winners

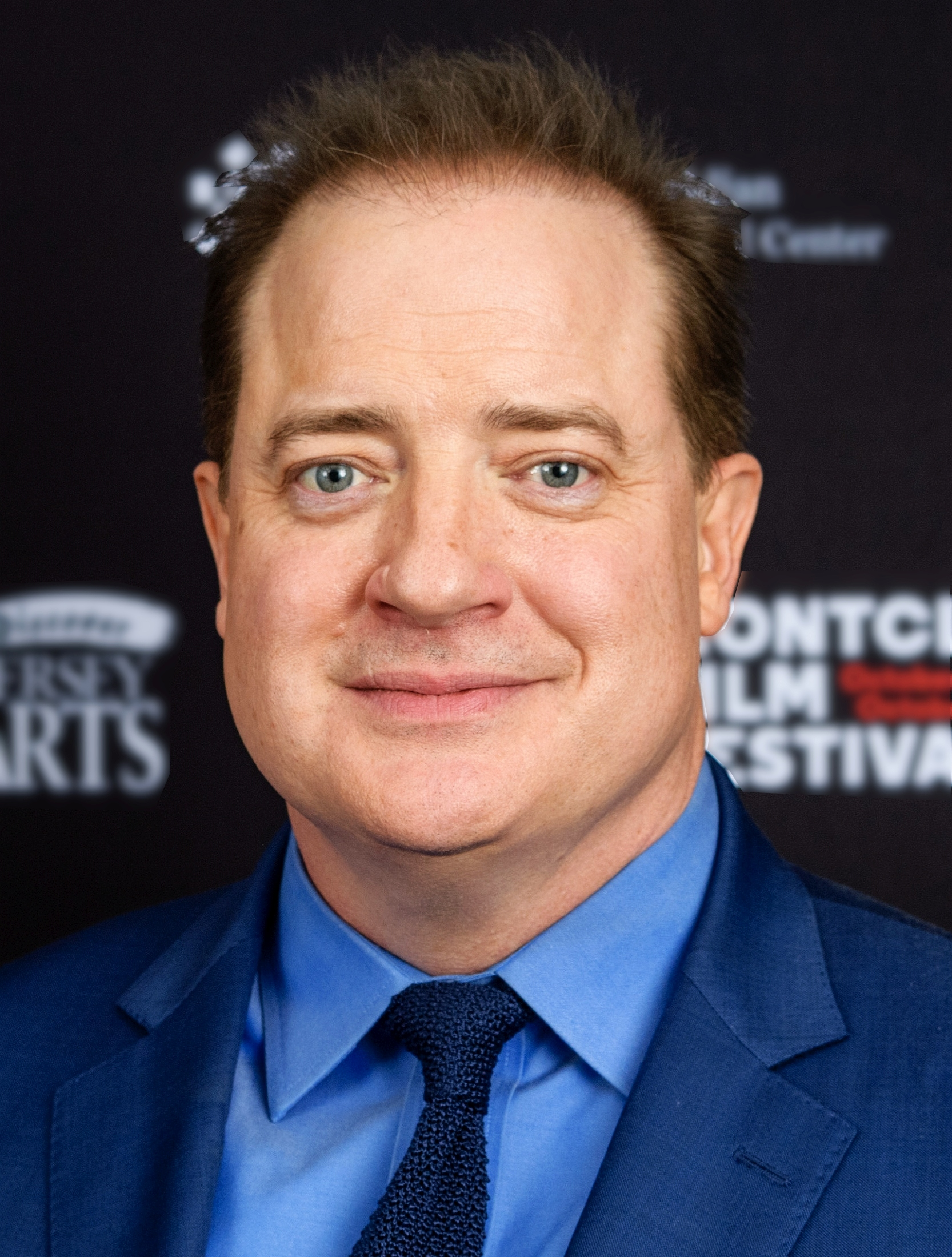
Brendan Fraser, Best Actor winner

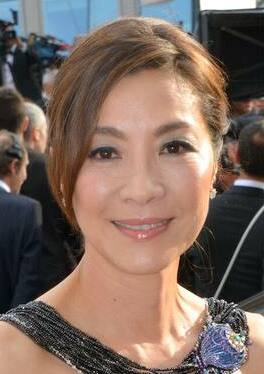
Michelle Yeoh, Best Actress winner

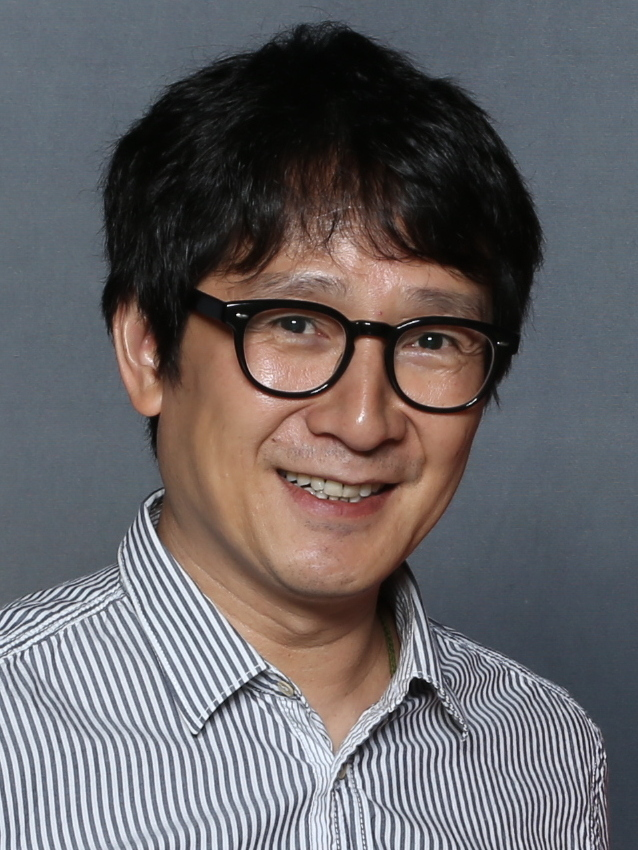
Ke Huy Quan, Best Supporting Actor winner

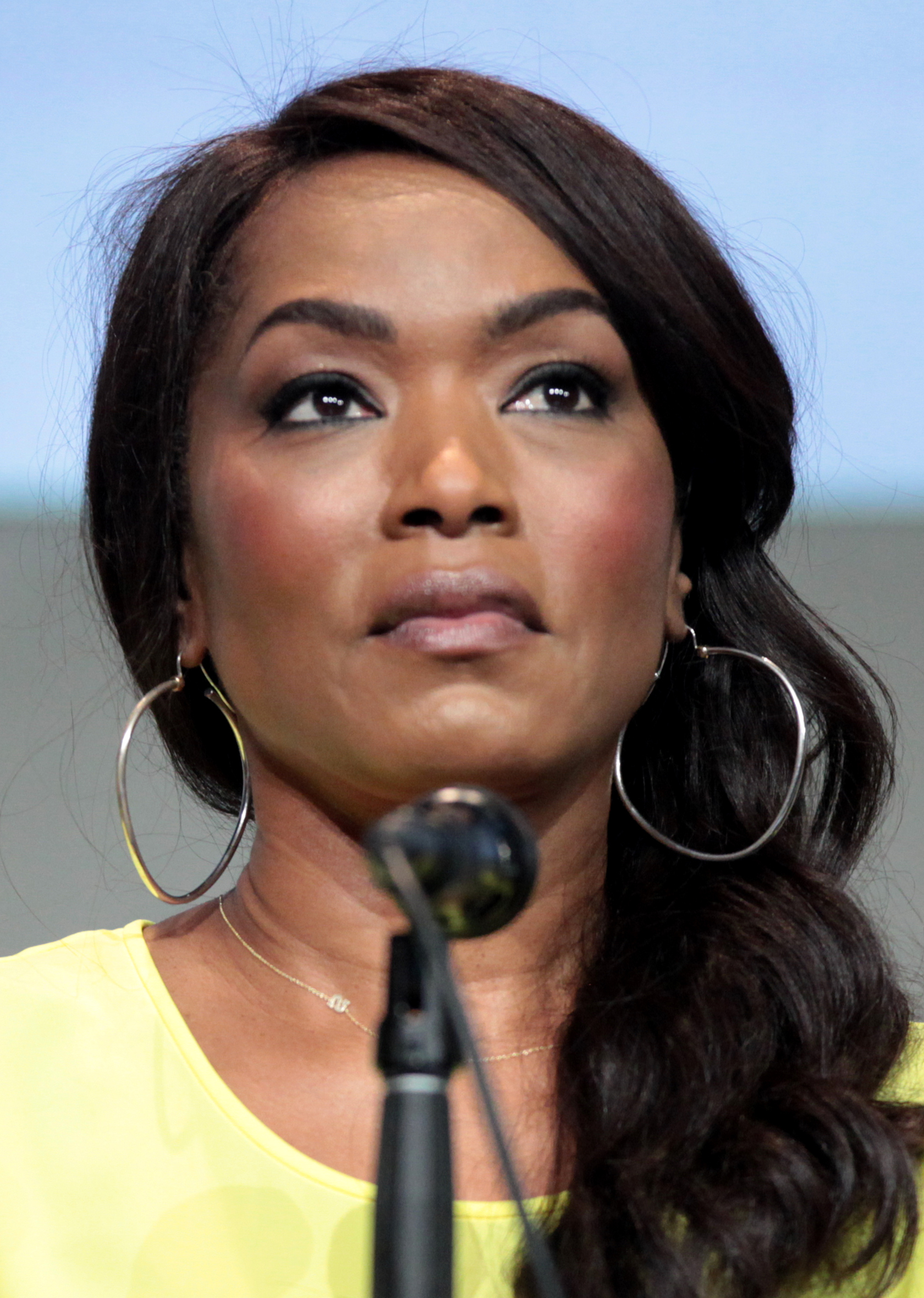
Angela Bassett, Best Supporting Actress winner

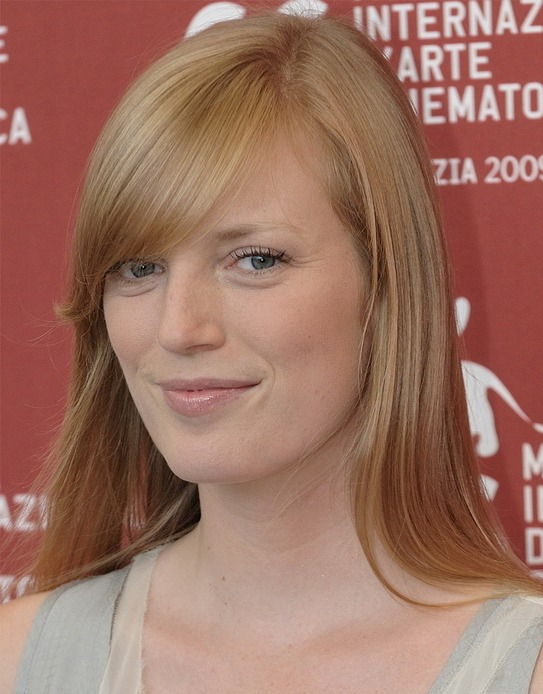
Sarah Polley, Best Adapted Screenplay winner

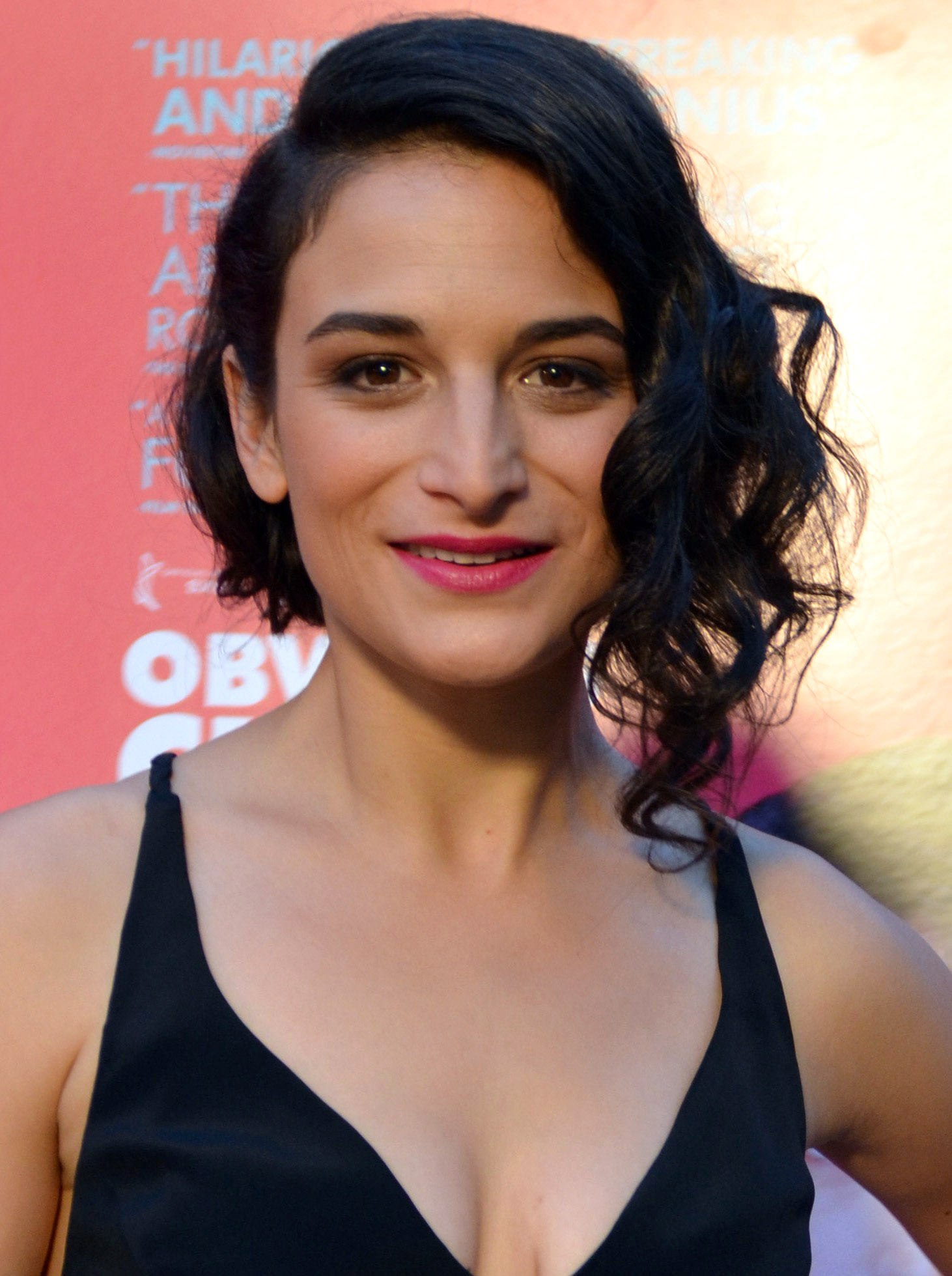
Jenny Slate, Best Voice or Motion-Capture Performance winner

**Best Picture**: **Everything Everywhere All at Once**; Avatar: The Way of Water; The Banshees of Inisherin; Elvis; The Fabelmans; RRR; Tár; Top Gun: Maverick; The Woman King; Women Talking	**Best Director**: **Daniel Kwan and Daniel Scheinert – Everything Everywhere All at Once**; Baz Luhrmann – Elvis; Gina Prince-Bythewood – The Woman King; James Cameron – Avatar: The Way of Water; Martin McDonagh – The Banshees of Inisherin; Park Chan-wook – Decision to Leave; S. S. Rajamouli – RRR; Sarah Polley – Women Talking; Steven Spielberg – The Fabelmans; Todd Field – Tár
**Best Actor**: **Brendan Fraser – The Whale as Charlie**; Austin Butler – Elvis as Elvis Presley; Colin Farrell – The Banshees of Inisherin as Pádraic Súilleabháin; Paul Mescal – Aftersun as Calum Paterson; Tom Cruise – Top Gun: Maverick as Captain Pete "Maverick" Mitchell	**Best Actress**: **Michelle Yeoh – Everything Everywhere All at Once as Evelyn Quan Wang**; Cate Blanchett – Tár as Lydia Tár; Danielle Deadwyler – Till as Mamie Till-Mobley; Michelle Williams – The Fabelmans as Mitzi Fabelman; Viola Davis – The Woman King as General Nanisca
**Best Supporting Actor**: **Ke Huy Quan – Everything Everywhere All at Once as Waymond Wang**; Barry Keoghan – The Banshees of Inisherin as Dominic Kearney; Ben Whishaw – Women Talking as August; Brendan Gleeson – The Banshees of Inisherin as Colm Doherty; Brian Tyree Henry – Causeway as James Aucoin	**Best Supporting Actress**: **Angela Bassett – Black Panther: Wakanda Forever as Queen Ramonda**; Hong Chau – The Whale as Liz; Jamie Lee Curtis – Everything Everywhere All at Once as Deirdre Beaubeirdre; Keke Palmer – Nope as Emerald "Em" Haywood; Kerry Condon – The Banshees of Inisherin as Siobhán Súilleabháin; Stephanie Hsu – Everything Everywhere All at Once as Joy Wang / Jobu Tupaki
**Best Original Screenplay**: **Daniel Kwan and Daniel Scheinert – Everything Everywhere All at Once**; Martin McDonagh – The Banshees of Inisherin; Seth Reiss and Will Tracy – The Menu; Steven Spielberg and Tony Kushner – The Fabelmans; Todd Field – Tár	**Best Adapted Screenplay**: **Sarah Polley – Women Talking**; Guillermo del Toro and Patrick McHale – Guillermo del Toro's Pinocchio; Rebecca Lenkiewicz – She Said; Rian Johnson – Glass Onion: A Knives Out Mystery; Samuel D. Hunter – The Whale
**Best Cast Ensemble**: **Everything Everywhere All at Once**; Babylon; Glass Onion: A Knives Out Mystery; The Woman King; Women Talking	**Best Voice or Motion-Capture Performance**: **Jenny Slate – Marcel the Shell with Shoes On as Marcel**; Antonio Banderas – Puss in Boots: The Last Wish as Puss in Boots; Ewan McGregor – Guillermo del Toro's Pinocchio as Sebastian J. Cricket; Rosalie Chiang – Turning Red as Meilin "Mei" Lee; Zoe Saldaña – Avatar: The Way of Water as Neytiri
**Best Action Film**: **RRR**; The Batman; Black Panther: Wakanda Forever; Top Gun: Maverick; The Woman King	**Best Animated Film**: **Guillermo del Toro's Pinocchio**; The Bad Guys; Marcel the Shell with Shoes On; Puss in Boots: The Last Wish; Turning Red
**Best Comedy**: **Glass Onion: A Knives Out Mystery**; Bros; The Menu; Triangle of Sadness; The Unbearable Weight of Massive Talent	**Best Documentary Film**: **Good Night Oppy**; All the Beauty and the Bloodshed; Fire of Love; Moonage Daydream; Selena Gomez: My Mind & Me
**Best Horror Film**: **The Black Phone**; Barbarian; Bones and All; Nope; X	**Best Indie Film**: **Marcel the Shell with Shoes On**; Aftersun; Cha Cha Real Smooth; Everything Everywhere All at Once; Tár
**Best International Film**: **RRR**; All Quiet on the Western Front; Argentina, 1985; Close; Decision to Leave	**Best First Feature**: **Charlotte Wells – Aftersun**; Domee Shi – Turning Red; Elegance Bratton – The Inspection; John Patton Ford – Emily the Criminal; Lila Neugebauer – Causeway
**Best Short Film**: **All Too Well: The Short Film**; Moshari; North Star; Regret to Inform You; Triggered	**Best Stunts**: **RRR**; The Batman; Everything Everywhere All at Once; Top Gun: Maverick; The Woman King
**Best Original Song**: **"Naatu Naatu", sung by Rahul Sipligunj and Kaala Bhairava – RRR**; "Hold My Hand", sung by Lady Gaga – Top Gun: Maverick; "Lift Me Up", sung by Rihanna – Black Panther: Wakanda Forever; "Nobody Like U", sung by 4*Town – Turning Red; "Vegas", sung by Doja Cat – Elvis

== Honorary awards ==
- Star on the Rise Award – Gabriel LaBelle
- Artisan Achievement Award – Rick Carter
- Acting Achievement Award – Angela Bassett
- Filmmaking Achievement Award – Rian Johnson
- Spotlight Award – Cast and crew of RRR (N. T. Rama Rao Jr., Ram Charan, Alia Bhatt, etc.)

== Films with multiple wins ==
The following films received multiple awards:

Wins	Film
6	Everything Everywhere All at Once
4	RRR
2	Marcel the Shell with Shoes On

== Films with multiple nominations ==
The following films received multiple nominations:

Nominations	Film
10	Everything Everywhere All at Once
7	The Banshees of Inisherin
6	RRR
6	The Woman King
5	Tár
5	Top Gun: Maverick
5	Women Talking
4	Elvis
4	The Fabelmans
4	Turning Red
3	Aftersun
3	Avatar: The Way of Water
3	Black Panther: Wakanda Forever
3	Glass Onion: A Knives Out Mystery
3	Guillermo del Toro's Pinocchio
3	Marcel the Shell with Shoes On
3	The Whale
2	The Batman
2	Causeway
2	Decision to Leave
2	The Menu
2	Nope
2	Puss in Boots: The Last Wish

== See also ==
- 2nd Hollywood Critics Association TV Awards
- 5th Hollywood Critics Association Midseason Film Awards
- 1st Hollywood Critics Association Creative Arts Film Awards
