= Dallas–Fort Worth Film Critics Association Awards 2022 =

Annual US film awards ceremony

28th Dallas–Fort Worth Film Critics Association Awards
- Date: December 19, 2022
- Location: Dallas, Texas
- Country: United States
- Presented by: Dallas–Fort Worth Film Critics Association
- Website: dfwcritics.com

The 28th Dallas–Fort Worth Film Critics Association Awards, honoring the best in film for 2022, were announced on December 19, 2022. These awards "recognizing extraordinary accomplishment in film" are presented annually by the Dallas–Fort Worth Film Critics Association (DFWFCA), based in the Dallas–Fort Worth metroplex region of Texas. The association, founded in and presenting awards since 1990, includes 30 film critics for print, radio, television, and internet publications based in North Texas. It is also committed to ensuring that their membership represents a broad range of voices, ideas and perspectives from across cultural, gender and ideological spectra.

The Banshees of Inisherin and Everything Everywhere All at Once were the DFWFCA's most awarded films of 2022, taking three honors apiece.

== Winners and nominees ==
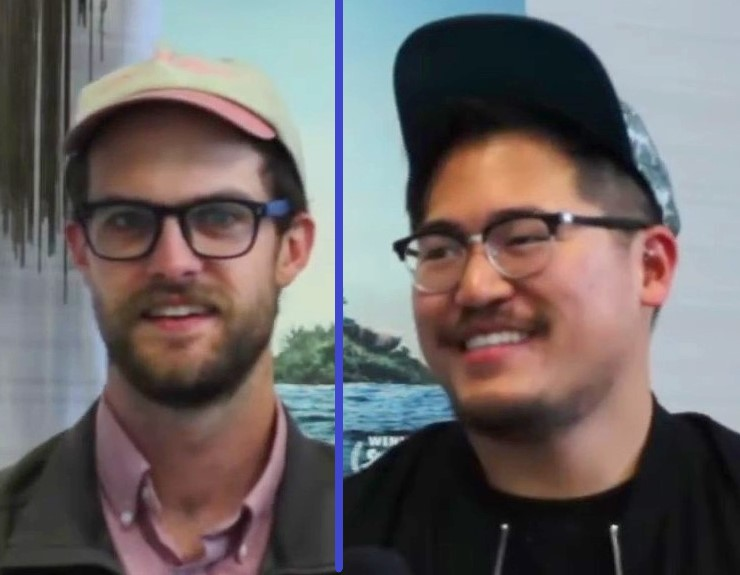
Daniel Scheinert and Daniel Kwan, Best Director winners

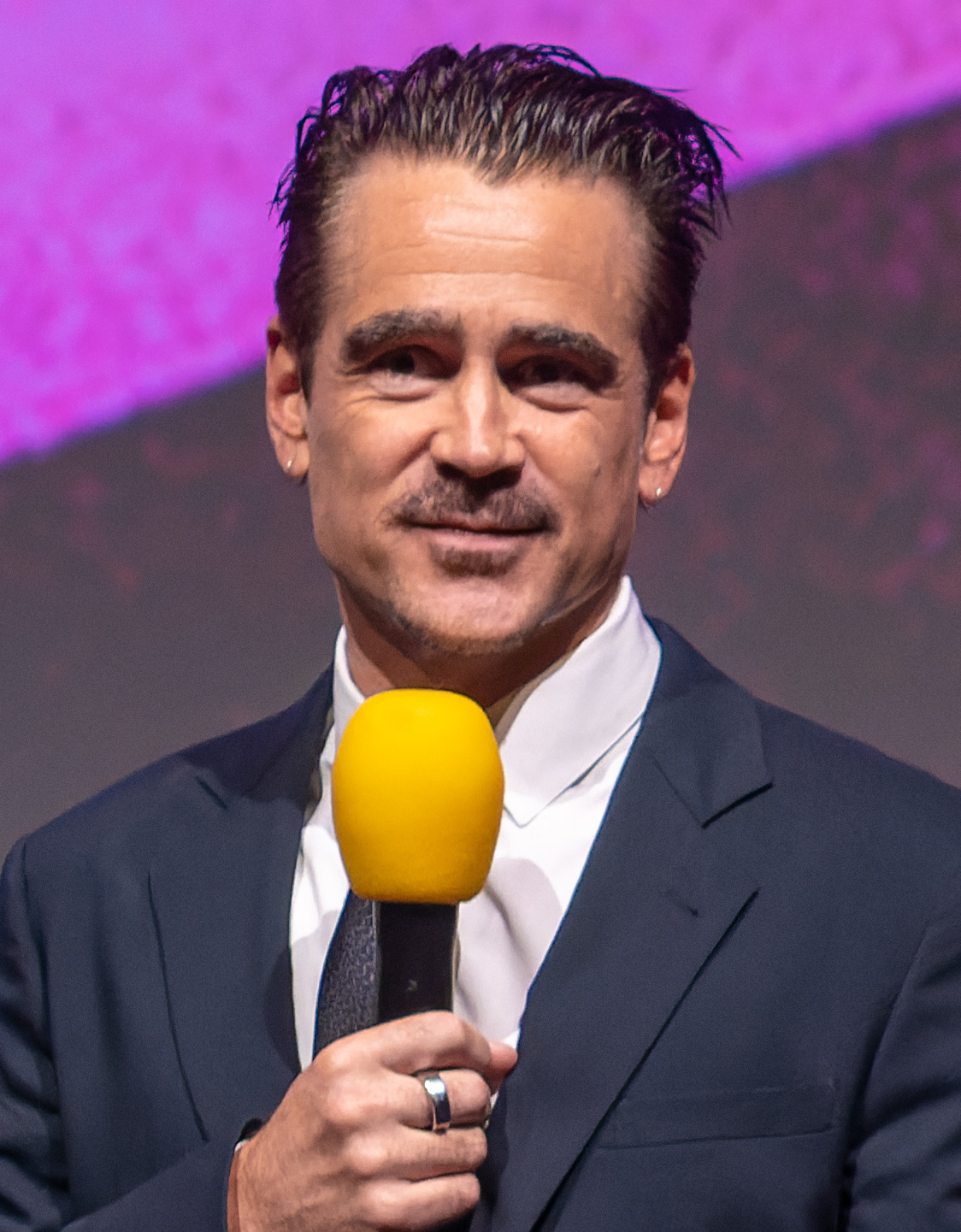
Colin Farrell, Best Actor winner

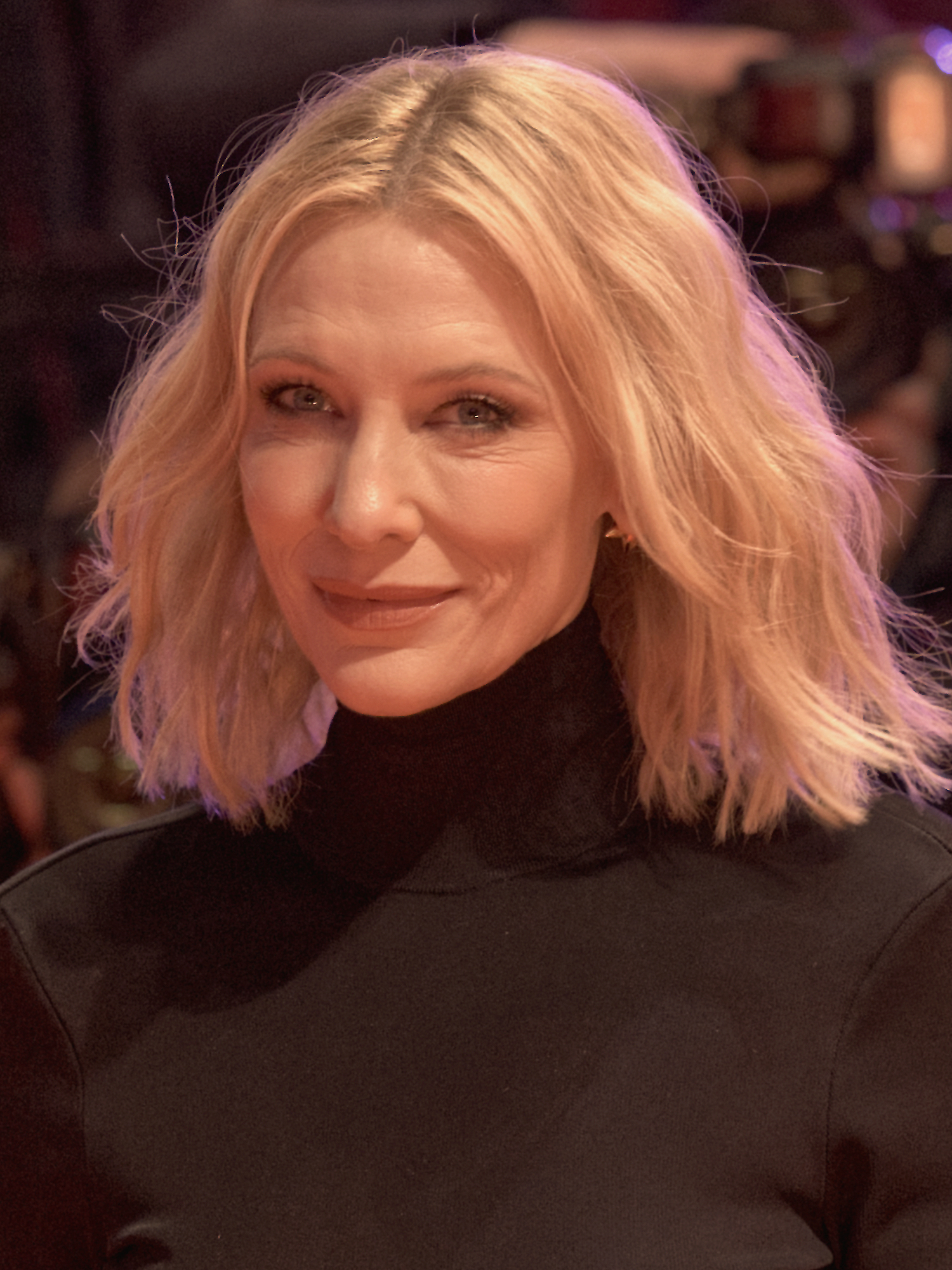
Cate Blanchett, Best Actress winner

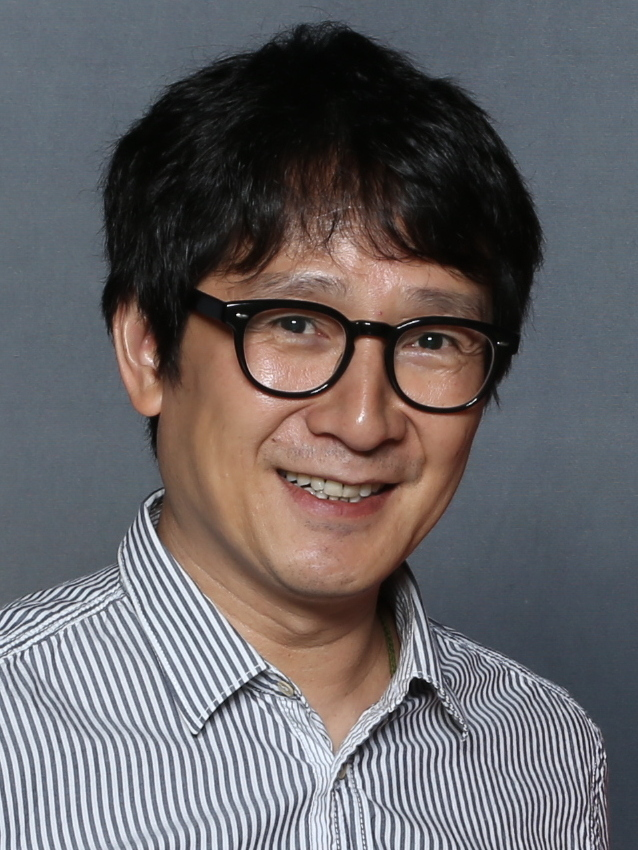
Ke Huy Quan, Best Supporting Actor winner

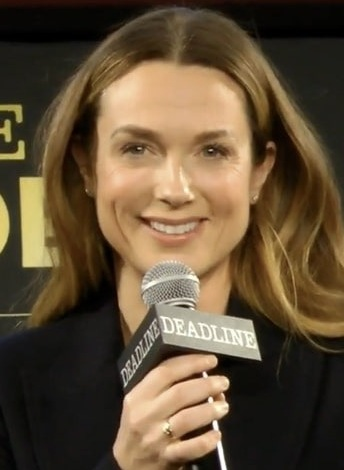
Kerry Condon, Best Supporting Actress winner

=== Category awards ===
Winners are listed first and highlighted with boldface. Other films ranked by the annual poll are listed in order. While most categories saw 5 honorees named, categories ranged from as many as 10 (Best Film) to as few as 2 (Best Animated Film, Best Screenplay, Best Cinematography, and Best Musical Score).

Best Picture	Best Director
1. **Everything Everywhere All at Once**; 2. The Banshees of Inisherin; 3. The Fabelmans; 4. Tár; 5. Top Gun: Maverick; 6. Women Talking; 7. The Whale; 8. Guillermo del Toro's Pinocchio; 9. Babylon; 10. The Woman King	1. **Daniel Kwan and Daniel Scheinert – Everything Everywhere All at Once**; 2. Steven Spielberg – The Fabelmans; 3. Todd Field – Tár; 4. Martin McDonagh – The Banshees of Inisherin; 5. Sarah Polley – Women Talking
Best Actor	Best Actress
1. **Colin Farrell – The Banshees of Inisherin as Pádraic Súilleabháin**; 2. Brendan Fraser – The Whale as Charlie; 3. Austin Butler – Elvis as Elvis Presley; 4. Bill Nighy – Living as Mr. Williams; 5. Tom Cruise – Top Gun: Maverick as Captain Pete "Maverick" Mitchell	1. **Cate Blanchett – Tár as Lydia Tár**; 2. Michelle Yeoh – Everything Everywhere All at Once as Evelyn Quan Wang; 3. Michelle Williams – The Fabelmans as Mitzi Fabelman; 4. Danielle Deadwyler – Till as Mamie Till-Mobley; 5. Viola Davis – The Woman King as General Nanisca
Best Supporting Actor	Best Supporting Actress
1. **Ke Huy Quan – Everything Everywhere All at Once as Waymond Wang**; 2. Brendan Gleeson – The Banshees of Inisherin as Colm Doherty; 3. Paul Dano – The Fabelmans as Burt Fabelman; 4. Brian Tyree Henry – Causeway as James Aucoin; 5. Ben Whishaw – Women Talking as August	1. **Kerry Condon – The Banshees of Inisherin as Siobhán Súilleabháin**; 2. Hong Chau – The Whale as Liz; 3. Angela Bassett – Black Panther: Wakanda Forever as Queen Ramonda; 4. Jessie Buckley – Women Talking as Mariche; 5. Janelle Monáe – Glass Onion: A Knives Out Mystery as Helen Brand / Cassandra "Andi" Brand
Best Documentary Film	Best Foreign Language Film
1. **Good Night Oppy**; 2. All That Breathes; 3. Fire of Love; 4. Moonage Daydream; 5. Bad Axe	1. **Decision to Leave**; 2. Close; 3. Argentina, 1985; 4. All Quiet on the Western Front; 5. EO
Best Animated Film	Best Screenplay
1. **Guillermo del Toro's Pinocchio**; 2. Marcel the Shell with Shoes On	1. **Martin McDonagh – The Banshees of Inisherin**; 2. Daniel Kwan and Daniel Scheinert – Everything Everywhere All at Once
Best Cinematography	Best Musical Score
1. **Russell Carpenter – Avatar: The Way of Water**; 2. Claudio Miranda – Top Gun: Maverick **(TIE)** Greig Fraser – The Batman **(TIE)**	1. **Alexandre Desplat – Guillermo del Toro's Pinocchio**; 2. John Williams – The Fabelmans

=== Special award ===
==== Russell Smith Award ====
- **EO**, for "best low-budget or cutting-edge independent film"
