= Babylon (2022 film) =

Film by Damien Chazelle

- Theatrical release poster
- Directed by: Damien Chazelle
- Written by: Damien Chazelle
- Produced by: Marc Platt; Matthew Plouffe; Olivia Hamilton
- Starring: Brad Pitt; Margot Robbie; Diego Calva; Jean Smart; Jovan Adepo; Li Jun Li
- Cinematography: Linus Sandgren
- Edited by: Tom Cross
- Music by: Justin Hurwitz
- Production companies: Paramount Pictures; C2 Motion Picture Group; Marc Platt Productions; Wild Chickens Productions; Organism Pictures
- Distributed by: Paramount Pictures
- Release dates: November 14, 2022 (Los Angeles); December 23, 2022 (United States)
- Running time: 189 minutes
- Country: United States
- Language: English (Note: Select dialogue delivered in Spanish.)
- Budget: $78–80 million
- Box office: $64.9 million

Babylon is a 2022 American epic period tragicomedy film written and directed by Damien Chazelle. It features an ensemble cast that includes Brad Pitt, Margot Robbie, Diego Calva, Jean Smart, Jovan Adepo, and Li Jun Li. It chronicles the rise and fall of many characters during Hollywood's change from silent to sound films in the late 1920s.

Chazelle began developing Babylon in July 2019, with Lionsgate Films as the frontrunner to acquire the project. It was announced that Paramount Pictures had acquired worldwide rights in November 2019. Much of the main cast joined the project between January 2020 and August 2021, and filming took place in Los Angeles from July to October 2021.

Babylon premiered at the Samuel Goldwyn Theater in Los Angeles on November 14, 2022, and was released in the United States on December 23, 2022. It was met with a polarized response from critics upon release and was a box-office bomb, grossing $65 million against a production budget of $78–80 million and losing Paramount $87 million. It received five nominations at the 80th Golden Globe Awards (including Best Motion Picture – Musical or Comedy, winning Best Original Score), three nominations at the 76th British Academy Film Awards (winning Best Production Design) and three nominations at the 95th Academy Awards. In later years, the film is said to have developed a cult following.

== Plot ==
In 1926 Bel Air, Mexican immigrant Manuel "Manny" Torres helps transport an elephant to a bacchanal at the mansion of his employer, Kinoscope Studios boss Don Wallach. Amidst the libertine event rife with sex, jazz, and cocaine, Manny becomes infatuated with Nellie LaRoy, a wide-eyed, hedonistic "star" from New Jersey. They bond over their shared desires of becoming big-name players in Hollywood. Also attending are Chinese American lesbian cabaret-singer Lady Fay Zhu, African American jazz trumpeter Sidney Palmer, and oft-married silent film star Jack Conrad.

Afterwards, Manny helps carry away young actress Jane Thornton, who overdosed on drugs while engaging in urolagnia with another actor, by having the elephant walk through to distract partygoers. The flamboyantly-dancing Nellie is spotted and swiftly recruited to replace Jane in a Kinoscope film. Manny escorts Jack home in the morning, and he decides to hire Manny as his assistant. While filming the next day, Nellie impresses with her natural acting ability and upstages the actor-producer, while Manny provides an urgently-needed camera in time to shoot Jack's scenes at golden hour. In the aftermath, Nellie becomes an "it girl" covered by gossip columnist Elinor St. John, who also follows Jack's career, while Manny makes industry connections.

Jack has Manny attend the premiere of The Jazz Singer in New York City to gauge the reaction to sound film. There, he reunites with Nellie, who introduces him to her institutionalized mother, and they agree to keep in touch when returning home. Despite their attempts and Manny’s assistance, Jack and Nellie both struggle to navigate sound film’s demands, with Jack relegated to smaller ensemble roles such as The Hollywood Revue of 1929. Nellie copes by increasing her drug use and gambling, tarnishing her reputation. At one point, after overhearing gossip about her, she eggs on her father and inept business manager Robert to fight a rattlesnake at a party; inebriated, he instead passes out. Nellie fights the snake, which bites her neck; Fay kills it and sucks out the venom. Nellie passionately kisses her, fueling rumors of a romantic relationship between them.

Manny pitches films starring Sidney's orchestra and becomes a Metro-Goldwyn-Mayer studio executive under Irving Thalberg. As the Hays Code goes into effect, executives order Manny to fire Fay, a Kinoscope title-writer, due to her rumors with Nellie. Further, they have Manny insist to the comparatively light-skinned Sidney that he don blackface to assuage Southern audiences' aversion to interracial people; humiliated, Sidney leaves Kinoscope once filming wraps. With Elinor and Thalberg’s help, Manny tries to save Nellie’s career by revamping her image for high society; upset at being repressed from her partying lifestyle, she has a breakdown against upper-class snobbery at a party hosted by William Randolph Hearst.

By 1932, Jack finds larger work in critically-panned MGM films. He falls into a depression after learning his longtime friend/producer, George Munn, has committed suicide following repeated heartbreak. Jack confronts Elinor over a story on his declining popularity; she explains that his star has faded, but he will be immortalized on film. Jack encounters Fay at a hotel party where she reveals her departure for Pathé in Europe; he then returns to his hotel room and commits suicide.

Eccentric gangster James McKay threatens Nellie over her gambling debts. Hiding her at his house, Manny secures funds from movie-set drug-pusher "The Count", and visits James with him to pay the debts. Manny panics upon learning that it is prop money. While dragging them through a subterranean gathering space for depraved zoosadist parties, James discovers the ruse, and Manny and the Count flee. To escape James, Manny asks Nellie to flee with him to Mexico, marry and start a new life; she eventually agrees. While Manny gathers their belongings, Nellie reneges on her decision, dancing away into the night. James's associate finds Manny, killing the Count and his roommate. When a terrified Manny wets himself, the hitman spares him on the condition he leaves Los Angeles.

Sidney finds happiness again by playing at black establishments, while newspaper clippings reveals Elinor's and Nellie's deaths, the latter from an overdose alone in her apartment. In 1952, Manny returns to California with his wife and daughter, having fled to New York City and established a radio shop. After showing them the Kinoscope Studios entrance, he visits a nearby cinema alone to see Singin' in the Rain, whose depiction of the industry's transition from silents to talkies piques his interest. He is then moved to tears as he transcendently witnesses films from the past, present, and future.

== Cast ==
- Brad Pitt as Jack Conrad (inspired by John Gilbert)
- Margot Robbie as Nellie LaRoy (inspired by Clara Bow)
- Diego Calva as Manny Torres
- Jean Smart as Elinor St. John
- Jovan Adepo as Sidney Palmer
- Li Jun Li as Lady Fay Zhu (inspired by Anna May Wong)
- P. J. Byrne as Max
- Lukas Haas as George Munn (inspired by Paul Bern)
- Olivia Hamilton as Ruth Adler
- Max Minghella as Irving Thalberg
- Rory Scovel as The Count
- Katherine Waterston as Estelle Conrad
- Tobey Maguire as James McKay
- Flea as Bob Levine
- Jeff Garlin as Don Wallach
- Eric Roberts as Robert Roy
- Ethan Suplee as Wilson
- Samara Weaving as Constance Moore
- Olivia Wilde as Ina Conrad
- Phoebe Tonkin as Jane Thornton
- Troy Metcalf as Orville Pickwick
- Telvin Griffin as Reggie
- Albert Hammond Jr. as Guest in chicken line
- Joe Dallesandro as Charlie the photographer
- Kaia Gerber as Starlet
- Patrick Fugit as Officer Elwood
- Alexandre Chen as Ruth's D.P. (James Wong Howe)
- Cyrus Hobbi as Footballer
- John Mariano as Master of ceremonies
- Chloe Fineman as Marion Davies
- Pat Skipper as William Randolph Hearst
- Sarah Ramos as Harriet Rothschild
- Jennifer Grant as Mildred Yates
- Mather Zickel as Distribution executive
- Taylor Hill as Rebecca
- Marc Platt as Producer
- Karen Bethzabe as Silvia Torres
- Spike Jonze as Otto von Strassberger (uncredited)

J.C. Currais cameos as the truck driver during the film's opening scene. Mike Manning makes an uncredited appearance as a "New York fan." Damien Chazelle "voice cameos" as partygoers outside the bathroom Nellie hides in at one point in the film.

== Production ==
=== Development ===
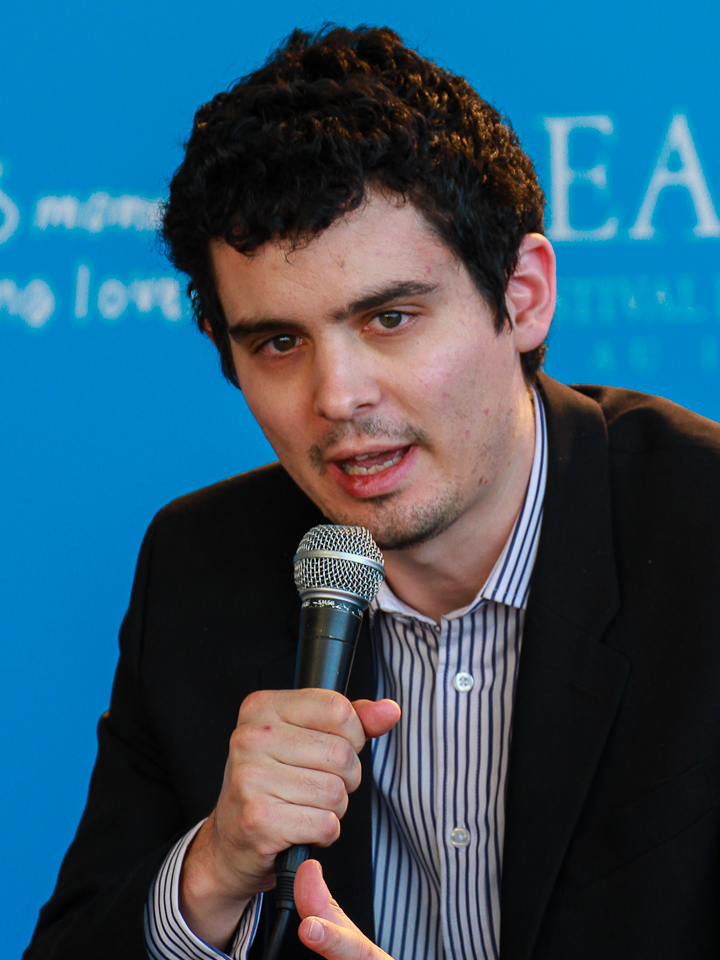
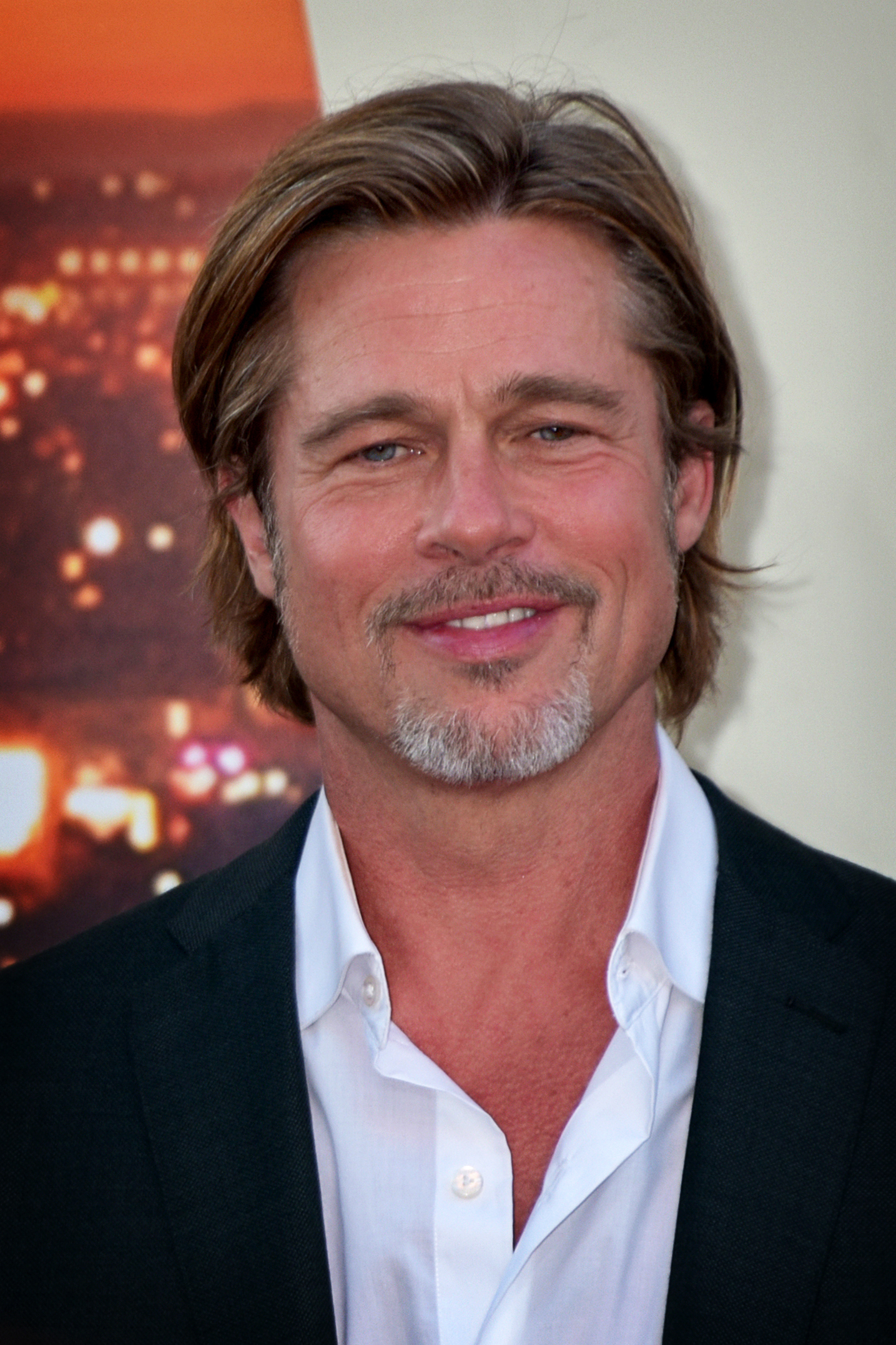
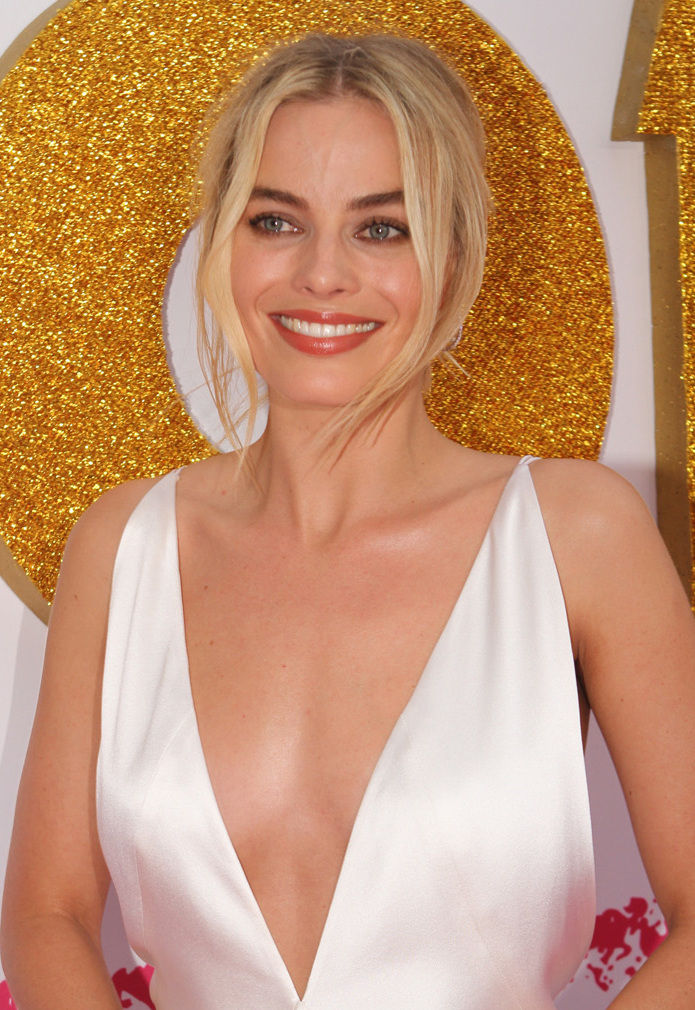
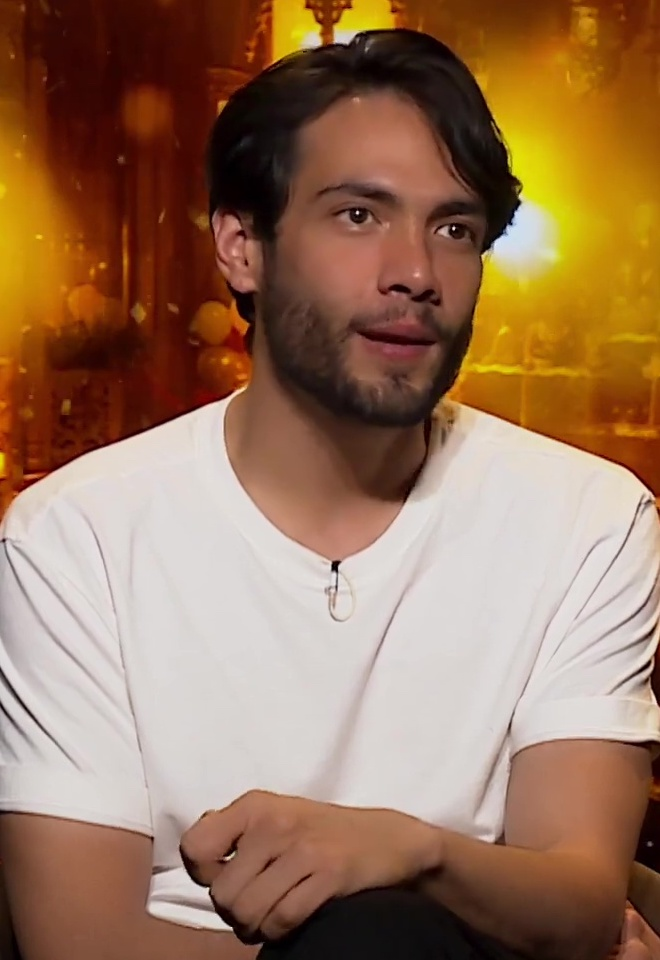
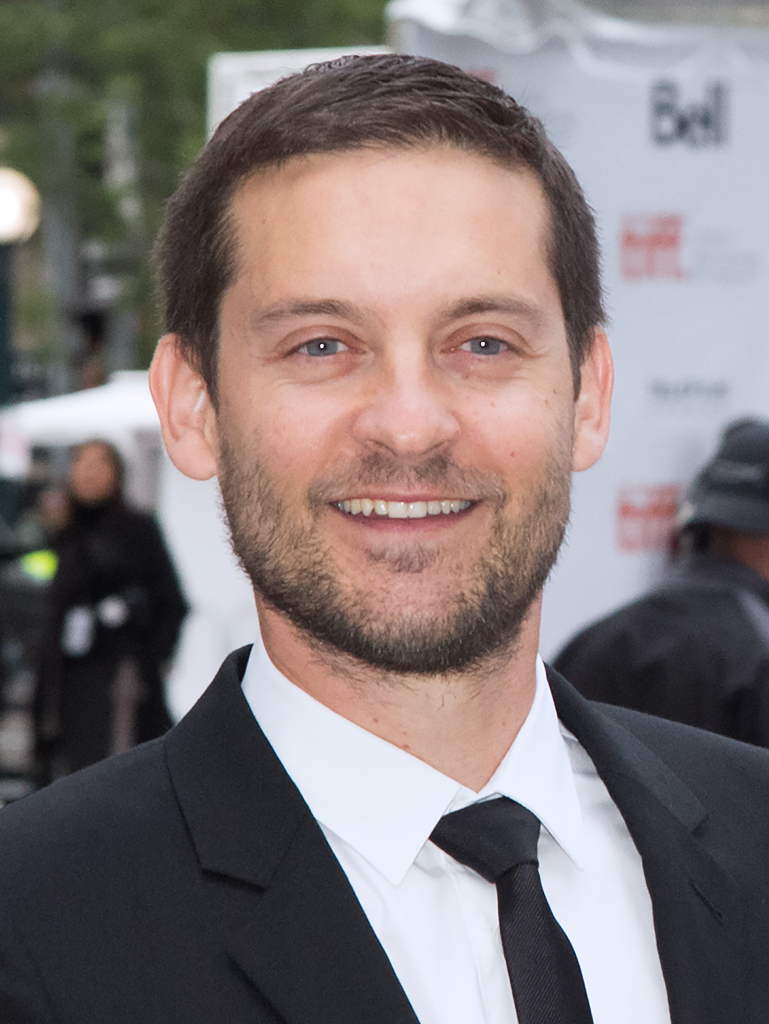
Writer and director Damien Chazelle (left), lead actor Brad Pitt, lead actress Margot Robbie, lead actor Diego Calva, and actor/executive producer Tobey Maguire.

It was announced in July 2019 that Damien Chazelle had set his next project following First Man (2018) as a period drama set in the Golden Age of Hollywood. Lionsgate Films was the frontrunner to acquire the project after distributing Chazelle's La La Land (2016), with Emma Stone (also having worked on La La Land) and Brad Pitt in the mix to star. In November, Paramount Pictures acquired worldwide rights to the project, with Stone and Pitt still circling roles. Pitt confirmed his involvement in January 2020, describing the film as being set when the silent film era transitioned into sound. He was set to play a character modeled on actor-director John Gilbert.

By December 2020, Margot Robbie was in early negotiations to replace Stone, who exited the film due to scheduling conflicts, and Li Jun Li was also cast. Robbie was confirmed in March 2021, with Jovan Adepo and Diego Calva also joining.

In June, Katherine Waterston, Max Minghella, Flea, Samara Weaving, Rory Scovel, Lukas Haas, Eric Roberts, P.J. Byrne, Damon Gupton, Olivia Wilde, Spike Jonze, Phoebe Tonkin, and Tobey Maguire (who is also an executive producer on the film) joined the cast. In July, Jean Smart joined the cast, with Chloe Fineman, Jeff Garlin, Telvin Griffin, and Troy Metcalf joining the cast the following month.

=== Filming ===
Filming was originally set to take place in California in mid-2020 but was postponed due to the COVID-19 pandemic. It began on July 1, 2021, and wrapped on October 21, 2021. Shea's Castle was used for the exterior shots of the mansion in the opening party scene, and interiors were shot inside the Ace Hotel Los Angeles. The movie ranch, Blue Sky Ranch, served as Kinescope Studios.

=== Music ===
Justin Hurwitz, a frequent collaborator of Chazelle, composed the film's score. Two tracks from the score, "Call Me Manny" and "Voodoo Mama," were released digitally on November 10, 2022, the latter track being used to underscore the film's first trailer. The soundtrack album was released by Interscope Records on December 9, 2022.

== Thematic analysis ==
In an essay for /Film, Robert Daniels asserts that Babylon is essentially a story of identity and assimilation in early Hollywood. While noting the similarities it shares with films such as The Last Black Man in San Francisco (2019), Bamboozled (2000), and Medicine for Melancholy (2008), Daniels focuses on character Manuel "Manny" Torres and his rise into the Hollywood studio system: "In the process, Manuel cuts off ties with his Mexican roots—though they live in Los Angeles, he never visits his family—he Americanizes his name to Manny, and at a party thrown by William Randolph Hearst, he presents himself as a Spaniard. Manuel becomes intoxicated by his proximity to the white capitalistic greed that governs Hollywood (and partly the American dream of upward mobility), causing him to traverse a tenuous betweenness of identity." Daniels writes that Manny's erasure of his identity is sparked by his fantasy romance with Nellie LaRoy—who represents what he loves about Hollywood: "An indefinable magical quality, upward mobility, picturesque happiness, and the ability to permanently define yourself." Daniels also adds that, while climbing the social ladder, Manny contributed to the mythology of Hollywood, recalling one scene where he expeditiously retrieved a camera for a large, destructive set and a picturesque scene is shot without future film audiences' knowledge of its production, and another scene where Manny pressures Black trumpeter Sidney Palmer to don blackface during the filming of a jazz short, so that the lighting on the set doesn't lighten his complexion in the final product.

Lisa Laman of Collider observed that Babylon functions as a rumination on how human beings try to outrun and ignore their innate mortality, pointing to the various nonchalant depictions of death (such as a newscaster's casual account of the suicide of a female Jack Conrad fan) as an especially discernible example of this thematic element. Laman also pointed to a key scene in the middle of Babylon concerning Conrad briefly being overwhelmed by the death of his friend George Munn before returning to his default unflappable persona to be another key instance of the feature functioning as a tragic meditation on people trying to evade the inevitable presence of death.

== Release ==
=== Theatrical ===
Babylon was first screened for critics and industry people on November 14, 2022, at the Samuel Goldwyn Theater in Los Angeles and in New York City the following day. It was released on December 23, 2022. The film was initially scheduled for a December 25, 2021, limited release and a January 7, 2022, wide release, but was later delayed by an entire year, with a December 25, 2022, limited release, and a January 6, 2023, wide release, due to the COVID-19 pandemic. In October, the film was moved two days earlier to the current date and set for a solely wide release instead.

=== Home media ===
The film was released on VOD platforms on January 31, 2023, and on Paramount+ on February 21, 2023. It was released on Blu-ray, DVD and 4K UHD a month later on March 21, 2023.

=== Marketing ===
The first red band trailer for Babylon premiered on September 12, 2022, at the 2022 Toronto International Film Festival during a Q&A event with Chazelle and TIFF CEO Cameron Bailey. It was released to the public the following day, alongside character posters of the main cast. Noting its uncensored nudity, profanity and drug use, several publications compared the trailer's atmosphere to that of films such as The Wolf of Wall Street and The Great Gatsby (both 2013), which star Robbie and Maguire, respectively. A featurette about the making of the film was released on November 21, 2022. The second and final trailer for the film and its theatrical release poster were released on November 28, 2022.

As Maggie Dela Paz notes at ComingSoon.net, "a brand new behind-the scenes featurette ...highlight[ing] Chazelle's ensemble cast of A-list stars and familiar supporting actors[, and] also featur[ing] commentary from the Oscar-nominated director as he talks about the challenge of handling this massive cast" was released on December 29, 2022.

== Reception ==
=== Box office ===
Babylon grossed $15.4 million in the United States and Canada, and $48 million in other territories, for a worldwide total of $63.4 million. Deadline Hollywood noted that with a combined production and promotion budget of around $160 million, Babylon would need to gross $250 million worldwide in order to break-even. The site ultimately calculated that the film lost the studio $87.4 million, when factoring together all expenses and revenues.

In the United States and Canada, Babylon was released alongside Whitney Houston: I Wanna Dance with Somebody, and was initially projected to gross $12–15 million from 3,342 theaters over its four-day opening weekend. The film made $1.5 million on its first day (including Thursday-night previews) and went on to debut to just $3.5 million in its opening weekend (and a total of $5.3 million over the four days), finishing fourth at the box office. Deadline cited the general public's declining interest in prestige films, the threat of a tripledemic surge in COVID-19 and flu cases, and the nationwide impact of Winter Storm Elliott as reasons for lower-than-expected theater attendance. In its second weekend, the film made $2.6 million (a drop of 27.5%), finishing in fifth.

In Europe, the film took $3.3 million on its opening weekend in France and $1.6 million (£1.3 million) in the United Kingdom, coming second and third respectively at the box office.

=== Critical response ===
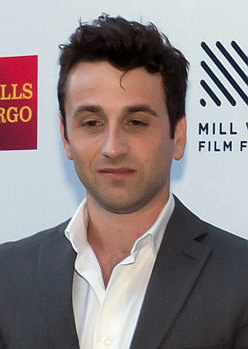
Despite the film's polarizing response, Justin Hurwitz's score was praised by critics as one of the film's strengths, and earned him numerous accolades, including the Golden Globe Award for Best Original Score and a nomination for the Academy Award for Best Original Score.

According to IndieWire and The Hollywood Reporter, as well as the opinion of Chazelle himself, response to the film was "polarized". On the review aggregator website Rotten Tomatoes, Babylon holds an approval rating of 57% based on 363 reviews, with an average rating of 6.4/10. The site's critics consensus reads: "Babylon's overwhelming muchness is exhausting, but much like the industry it honors, its well-acted, well-crafted glitz and glamour can often be an effective distraction." On Metacritic, the film has a weighted average score of 61 out of 100, based on 63 critics, indicating "generally favorable" reviews. Audiences polled by CinemaScore gave the film an average grade of "C+" on an A+ to F scale, while PostTrak reported 74% of audience members gave the film a positive score, with 47% saying they would definitely recommend it.

In his review for the San Francisco Chronicle, Mick LaSalle praised Chazelle's ambition and direction, writing that "Babylon is what movie love really looks like." THR's David Rooney described it as a "syncopated concentration of hedonistic revelry", praising the cast performances, score, cinematography, costume and production design, but criticizing the screenplay and direction—ultimately concluding "it's hard to imagine the overstuffed yet insubstantial Babylon finding its way into many screen-classic montages". Conversely, Pete Hammond of Deadline Hollywood wrote that "it is guaranteed to be a movie that will stay in your head", commending the direction, production design, and performances.

In his review for The Guardian, Peter Bradshaw assigned the film three stars out of five, applauding the performances of Robbie and Pitt for elevating "a story in no hurry to engage with the true-life nastiness of its era". Writing for Vanity Fair, Richard Lawson concurred with Bradshaw's sentiment, stating: "These are little islands in a sea of mannered chaos, but it begins to feel, as Babylon stretches out across three hours and eight minutes, that Chazelle has no clear idea where all of this is going." In a scathing review for Time, Stephanie Zacharek highlighted Jun Li's performance, but criticized Chazelle's screenplay and direction, summarizing: "Babylon is a manic sprawl that only pretends to celebrate cinema. It's really about prurience, dumb sensation, self-congratulation and willful ignorance of history."

In his review for The Ringer, Adam Nayman described Babylon as "a nauseous, high-calorie sugar rush of a movie that not only wants to have its cake and eat it too, but also to puke it up, smear it around, and cram it in the viewer's face". While praising Chazelle's direction and ambition, Nayman wrote that the film was a "deliberately designed career-killer" for the director. Writing less enthusiastically about the film in Variety, Peter Debruge stated that "Babylon presents itself as the apotheosis of all that has come before, the ne plus ultra of the medium's own potential, and indeed, it's an experience that won't be easily topped, in this or any year. But that doesn't make it great or even particularly coherent".

Richard Brody of The New Yorker praised Chazelle's storytelling and characters, but criticized other aspects of his screenplay, ultimately concluding: "Artistically, what Babylon adds to the classic Hollywood that it celebrates is sex and nudity, drugs and violence, a more diverse cast, and a batch of kitchen-sink chaos that replaces the whys and wherefores of coherent thought with the exhortation to buy a ticket, cast one's eyes up to the screen, and worship in the dark."

== Accolades ==
Award	Date of ceremony	Category	Recipient(s)	Result
Chicago Film Critics Association	December 14, 2022	Best Cinematography	Linus Sandgren	Nominated
Chicago Film Critics Association	December 14, 2022	Best Best Editing	Tom Cross	Nominated
Chicago Film Critics Association	December 14, 2022	Best Original Score	Justin Hurwitz	Won
Chicago Film Critics Association	December 14, 2022	Best Costume Design	Mary Zophres	Nominated
Chicago Film Critics Association	December 14, 2022	Best Art Direction/Production Design	Florencia Martin, Anthony Carlino	Nominated
St. Louis Gateway Film Critics Association	December 18, 2022	Best Score	Justin Hurwitz	Nominated
Dallas–Fort Worth Film Critics Association	December 19, 2022	Best Picture	Babylon	9th place
Florida Film Critics Circle	December 22, 2022	Best Score	Justin Hurwitz	Won
Florida Film Critics Circle	December 22, 2022	Best Art Direction / Production Design	Florencia Martin, Anthony Carlino	Won
Florida Film Critics Circle	December 22, 2022	Best Ensemble	Florencia Martin, Anthony Carlino	Runner-up
San Diego Film Critics Society	January 6, 2023	Best Cinematography	Linus Sandgren	Won
San Diego Film Critics Society	January 6, 2023	Best Costumes	Mary Zophres	Nominated
San Diego Film Critics Society	January 6, 2023	Best Production Design	Florencia Martin, Anthony Carlino	Won
San Francisco Bay Area Film Critics Circle	January 9, 2023	Best Cinematography	Linus Sandgren	Nominated
San Francisco Bay Area Film Critics Circle	January 9, 2023	Best Film Editing	Tom Cross	Nominated
San Francisco Bay Area Film Critics Circle	January 9, 2023	Best Original Score	Justin Hurwitz	Nominated
San Francisco Bay Area Film Critics Circle	January 9, 2023	Best Production Design	Florencia Martin, Anthony Carlino	Nominated
Austin Film Critics Association	January 10, 2023	Best Cinematography	Linus Sandgren	Nominated
Austin Film Critics Association	January 10, 2023	Best Score	Justin Hurwitz	Won
Golden Globe Awards	January 10, 2023	Best Motion Picture – Musical or Comedy	Babylon	Nominated
Golden Globe Awards	January 10, 2023	Best Actor in a Motion Picture – Musical or Comedy	Diego Calva	Nominated
Golden Globe Awards	January 10, 2023	Best Actress in a Motion Picture – Musical or Comedy	Margot Robbie	Nominated
Golden Globe Awards	January 10, 2023	Best Supporting Actor – Motion Picture	Brad Pitt	Nominated
Golden Globe Awards	January 10, 2023	Best Original Score	Justin Hurwitz	Won
Georgia Film Critics Association	January 13, 2023	Best Original Score	Justin Hurwitz	Runner-up
Georgia Film Critics Association	January 13, 2023	Best Production Design	Florencia Martin and Anthony Carlino	Won
Critics' Choice Movie Awards	January 15, 2023	Best Picture	Babylon	Nominated
Critics' Choice Movie Awards	January 15, 2023	Best Director	Damien Chazelle	Nominated
Critics' Choice Movie Awards	January 15, 2023	Best Actress	Margot Robbie	Nominated
Critics' Choice Movie Awards	January 15, 2023	Best Cinematography	Linus Sandgren	Nominated
Critics' Choice Movie Awards	January 15, 2023	Best Editing	Tom Cross	Nominated
Critics' Choice Movie Awards	January 15, 2023	Best Costume Design	Mary Zophres	Nominated
Critics' Choice Movie Awards	January 15, 2023	Best Production Design	Florencia Martin, Anthony Carlino	Won
Critics' Choice Movie Awards	January 15, 2023	Best Score	Justin Hurwitz	Nominated
Critics' Choice Movie Awards	January 15, 2023	Best Hair and Makeup	Babylon	Nominated
Seattle Film Critics Society	January 17, 2023	Best Actress in a Leading Role	Margot Robbie	Nominated
Seattle Film Critics Society	January 17, 2023	Best Costume Design	Mary Zophres	Nominated
Seattle Film Critics Society	January 17, 2023	Best Original Score	Justin Hurwitz	Won
Seattle Film Critics Society	January 17, 2023	Best Production Design	Florencia Martin, Anthony Carlino	Won
Online Film Critics Society	January 23, 2023	Best Original Score	Justin Hurwitz	Nominated
Online Film Critics Society	January 23, 2023	Best Costume Design	Babylon	Nominated
Online Film Critics Society	January 23, 2023	Best Production Design	Babylon	Nominated
Make-Up Artists and Hair Stylists Guild Awards	February 11, 2023	Best Period and/or Character Make-Up in a Feature-Length Motion Picture	Heba Thorisdottir, Shaunna Bren Chavez, Jean Black, Mandy Artusato	Nominated
Make-Up Artists and Hair Stylists Guild Awards	February 11, 2023	Best Period Hair Styling and/or Character Hair Styling in a Feature-Length Motion Picture	Jaime Leigh McIntosh, Ahou Mofid, Aubrey Marie	Nominated
Satellite Awards	March 3, 2023	Best Actor in a Motion Picture	Diego Calva	Nominated
Satellite Awards	March 3, 2023	Best Actress in a Motion Picture	Margot Robbie	Nominated
Satellite Awards	March 3, 2023	Best Actress in a Supporting Role	Jean Smart	Nominated
Satellite Awards	March 3, 2023	Best Art Direction and Production Design	Florencia Martin, Anthony Carlino	Won
Satellite Awards	March 3, 2023	Best Costume Design	Mary Zophres	Won
Satellite Awards	March 3, 2023	Best Original Score	Justin Hurwitz	Won
Satellite Awards	March 3, 2023	Best Sound	Steve Morrow, Ai-Ling Lee, Mildred Iatrou Morgan & Andy Nelson	Nominated
Satellite Awards	March 3, 2023	Best Visual Effects	Jay Cooper, Elia Popov, Kevin Martel, Ebrahim Jahromi	Nominated
Set Decorators Society of America Awards	February 14, 2023	Best Achievement in Decor/Design of a Period Feature Film	Florencia Martin, Anthony Carlino	Nominated
Hollywood Critics Association Creative Arts Awards	February 17, 2023	Best Costume Design	Mary Zophres	Nominated
Hollywood Critics Association Creative Arts Awards	February 17, 2023	Best Production Design	Florencia Martin, Anthony Carlino	Won
Hollywood Critics Association Creative Arts Awards	February 17, 2023	Best Score	Justin Hurwitz	Won
Houston Film Critics Society	February 18, 2023	Best Original Score	Justin Hurwitz	Nominated
Houston Film Critics Society	February 18, 2023	Best Cinematography	Linus Sandgren	Nominated
Art Directors Guild Awards	February 18, 2023	Excellence in Production Design for a Period Film	Florencia Martin	Won
British Academy Film Awards	February 19, 2023	Best Costume Design	Mary Zophres	Nominated
British Academy Film Awards	February 19, 2023	Best Original Score	Justin Hurwitz	Nominated
British Academy Film Awards	February 19, 2023	Best Production Design	Florencia Martin, Anthony Carlino	Won
Hollywood Critics Association Awards	February 24, 2023	Best Cast Ensemble	Babylon	Nominated
AACTA International Awards	February 24, 2023	Best Actress	Margot Robbie	Nominated
AACTA International Awards	February 24, 2023	Best Supporting Actor	Brad Pitt	Nominated
AACTA International Awards	February 24, 2023	Best Supporting Actress	Jean Smart	Nominated
Screen Actors Guild Award	February 26, 2023	Outstanding Performance by a Cast in a Motion Picture	Jovan Adepo, P.J. Byrne, Diego Calva, Lukas Haas, Olivia Hamilton, Li Jun Li, Tobey Maguire, Max Minghella, Brad Pitt, Margot Robbie, Rory Scovel, Jean Smart, Katherine Waterston	Nominated
Costume Designers Guild Awards	February 27, 2023	Excellence in Period Film	Mary Zophres	Nominated
Academy Awards	March 12, 2023	Best Costume Design	Mary Zophres	Nominated
Academy Awards	March 12, 2023	Best Original Score	Justin Hurwitz	Nominated
Academy Awards	March 12, 2023	Best Production Design	Florencia Martin, Anthony Carlino	Nominated
Golden Trailer Awards	June 29, 2023	Best Music	Babylon (Buddha Jones)	Won
Belgian Film Critics Association	January 6, 2024	Grand Prix	Babylon	Nominated

== See also ==
- The Birth of a Nation (1915): American silent epic historical drama film, depicting the filming scenes of a horse racing in Babylon.
- The Artist (2011): French black-and-white, partially silent film by Michel Hazanavicius, also depicting the transition to "talkies", and featuring a "Kinograph" studio resembling the "Kinoscope" of Babylon.
- Hollywood Babylon: 1965 book by Kenneth Anger about the dark side of early Hollywood, including the false premise that Clara Bow bedded the entire University of Southern California football team, somewhat as Nellie LaRoy brings that team to a party, and the Roscoe "Fatty" Arbuckle–Virginia Rappe death scandal, resembling Babylon's Orville Pickwick–Jane Thornton storyline.
- A Clockwork Orange (1971): Film by Stanley Kubrick (with heavy doses of sex, violence and reflection on art, like Babylon) which extensively uses the music from Singin' in the Rain (1952), including in the end credits (compared to Babylon's end scene showing Singin' in the Rain), albeit in a much more cynical and sarcastic way than in Babylon.
- Once Upon a Time in Hollywood (2019): Film by Quentin Tarantino which, like Babylon, features not only Pitt as an aging film-industry veteran (fictional stuntman Cliff Booth) facing difficulty with changes in the industry, but also Robbie as an upcoming, celebrated young actress (Sharon Tate) facing dangerous possibilities and people.
- The Wild Party, a 1975 Merchant-Ivory film shot in Riverside, California, loosely based on the 1926 narrative poem by Joseph Moncure March, about an aging silent-era star attempting a comeback via a party with a huge guest-list of industry figures, to show them his new film. (The poem was also made into two musicals, a Broadway show which followed the poem very closely, and an off-Broadway production, which took some artistic liberties, but still less than the film.)
- The Last Tycoon (1976): Film by Elia Kazan, based on the 1941 unfinished novel by F. Scott Fitzgerald, about early Hollywood artifice, skullduggery, sex, betrayal, and desperation, ending with studio head Monroe Stahr (Robert De Niro) walking off into the darkness, as Nellie does in Babylon.
