= Adrien Morot =

Canadian make-up artist

- Born: Adrien Francis Morot; 1970 (age 55–56); Montreal, Quebec, Canada
- Occupation: makeup artist
- Years active: 1993-present

Adrien Francis Morot (born 1970 in Montreal) is a Canadian makeup artist. In 2023 he won the Best Makeup and Hairstyling Oscar for The Whale (sharing the award with Judy Chin and Annemarie Bradley), having earlier received an additional nomination in the same category for the film Barney's Version, and he has won the Genie Award for Best Makeup twice for his work on Barney's Version and Cruising Bar 2.

== Early career ==
Morot had taken on various artistic interests since he was around five years old. He drew creatures inspired by those from monster movies; sculpted casts of his friends Star Wars toys; experimented with plasticine, Styrofoam, and Vaseline to make masks; and was making home movies beginning at the age of twelve. Though originally wanting to get into the film business as a stunt actor, his childhood experiences and a reading of a Fangoria feature about The Thing (1982) is what changed his career path to becoming a visual effects artist.

Morot tried to break in when he was seventeen by working as a prop assistant and storyboarding for various films made in Quebec. He quickly grew dissatisfied with being on set and the lack of FX work available in the area. At the age of 20, he went to Los Angeles as part of a tour offered by his friend, Jacques. After showing his portfolio to various workers in the effects industry, including Tom Savini (a man he first knew about from reading Fangoria), he quickly garnered six job offers.

== Selected filmography ==
- Mrs. Parker and the Vicious Circle - 1994
- The Wind from Wyoming (Le Vent du Wyoming) - 1994
- Octobre - 1994
- Relative Fear - 1994
- The Education of Little Tree - 1997
- The Bone Collector - 1999
- Battlefield Earth - 2000
- The Art of War - 2000
- Maelström - 2000
- Subconscious Cruelty - 2000
- A Glimpse of Hell - 2001
- WiseGirls - 2002
- The Collector (Le Collectionneur) - 2002
- Steal - 2002
- Alice's Odyssey (L'Odyssée d'Alice Tremblay) - 2002
- No Good Deed - 2002
- The Adventures of Pluto Nash - 2002
- My Little Eye - 2002
- Napoléon - 2002
- Evil Breed: The Legend of Samhain - 2003
- Evil Words (Sur le seuil) - 2003
- Beyond Borders - 2003
- Timeline - 2003
- Decoys - 2004
- Secret Window - 2004
- Taking Lives - 2004
- A Hole in One - 2004
- The Day After Tomorrow - 2004
- Noel - 2004
- The Last Sign - 2005
- Where the Truth Lies - 2005
- C.R.A.Z.Y. - 2005
- Guy X - 2005
- Aurore - 2005
- Dodging the Clock (Horloge biologique) - 2005
- Human Trafficking - 2005
- The Rocket (Maurice Richard) - 2005
- Les Boys IV - 2005
- The Woods - 2006
- Lucky Number Slevin - 2006
- Bon Cop, Bad Cop - 2006
- The Fountain - 2006
- The Covenant - 2006
- 300 - 2006
- Night at the Museum - 2006
- Decoys 2: Alien Seduction - 2007
- End of the Line - 2007
- Days of Darkness (L'Âge des ténèbres) - 2007
- The Great War - 2007
- Surviving My Mother (Comment survivre à sa mère) - 2007
- Redacted - 2007
- Just Buried - 2007
- The Spiderwick Chronicles - 2008
- Barney's Version - 2010
- The United States vs. Billie Holiday - 2021
- The Whale - 2022

== Works cited ==
- Rowe, Michael (May 1997). "The Island of Dr. Morot". Fangoria. No. 162. pp. 28–33.
