= Critics' Choice Movie Award for Best Makeup =

Award given by the Broadcast Film Critics Association

The Critics' Choice Movie Award for Best Makeup is one of the awards given to people working in the motion picture industry by the Broadcast Film Critics Association. It was first given out in 2009.

== Winners and nominees ==
=== 2000s ===
2009: District 9

- Avatar
- Nine
- The Road
- Star Trek

=== 2010s ===
2010: Alice in Wonderland

- Black Swan
- Harry Potter and the Deathly Hallows – Part 1
- True Grit

2011: Harry Potter and the Deathly Hallows – Part 2

- Albert Nobbs
- The Iron Lady
- J. Edgar
- My Week with Marilyn

2012: Cloud Atlas

- The Hobbit: An Unexpected Journey
- Les Misérables
- Lincoln

2013: American Hustle

- 12 Years a Slave
- The Butler
- The Hobbit: The Desolation of Smaug
- Rush

2014: Guardians of the Galaxy

- Foxcatcher
- The Hobbit: The Battle of the Five Armies
- Into the Woods
- Maleficent

2015: Mad Max: Fury Road

- Black Mass
- Carol
- The Danish Girl
- The Hateful Eight
- The Revenant

2016: Jackie

- Doctor Strange
- Fantastic Beasts and Where to Find Them
- Hacksaw Ridge
- Star Trek Beyond

2017: Darkest Hour

- Beauty and the Beast
- I, Tonya
- The Shape of Water
- Wonder

2018: Vice

- Black Panther
- Bohemian Rhapsody
- The Favourite
- Mary Queen of Scots
- Suspiria

2019: Bombshell

- Dolemite Is My Name
- The Irishman
- Joker
- Judy
- Once Upon a Time in Hollywood
- Rocketman

=== 2020s ===
2020: Ma Rainey's Black Bottom

- Emma
- Hillbilly Elegy
- Mank
- Promising Young Woman
- The United States vs. Billie Holiday

2021: The Eyes of Tammy Faye

- Cruella
- Dune
- House of Gucci
- Nightmare Alley

2022: Elvis

- Babylon
- The Batman
- Black Panther: Wakanda Forever
- Everything Everywhere All at Once
- The Whale

2023: Barbie

- The Color Purple
- Maestro
- Oppenheimer
- Poor Things
- Priscilla

2024: The Substance

- Beetlejuice Beetlejuice
- A Different Man
- Dune: Part Two
- Nosferatu
- Wicked

2025: Frankenstein

- 28 Years Later
- Sinners
- The Smashing Machine
- Weapons
- Wicked: For Good
