= Hollywood Creative Alliance =

American film critics organization

- Formation: 2016; 10 years ago
- Founder: Scott Menzel
- Purpose: To amplify diversity, equity, inclusion, accessibility, and culture within the world of entertainment.
- Location: Los Angeles, California, U.S.
- Website: hollywoodcreative.org
- Formerly called: Los Angeles Online Film Critics Society; Hollywood Critics Association

The Hollywood Creative Alliance (HCA) is a group of critics, entertainment journalists, content creators, industry influencers, and creatives. The vision and mission of the HCA is to amplify diversity, equity, inclusion, accessibility, and culture within the world of entertainment. It was founded in 2016 as the Los Angeles Online Film Critics Society and rebranded in 2019 to the Hollywood Critics Association. In 2023, it rebranded once more as the Hollywood Creative Alliance and renamed its awards ceremony as The Astra Awards.

== History ==
In 2016, Scott Menzel, Scott Mantz, and Ashley Menzel noted that Los Angeles only had one film critic organization. They founded the Los Angeles Online Film Critics Society to be a critics group that is diverse and supports underrepresented voices. The group originally separated directing honors by gender. "There has been so much conversation about the power of female filmmakers and we wanted to embrace it," said Scott Mantz.

In early 2019, the organization had a film discussion podcast called "Film Critics Weekly" on the defunct online broadcasting network "Popcorn Talk".

In 2019, the organization rebranded as Hollywood Critics Association.

On May 15, 2020, the organization organized a Film & Television Triviathon to collect funds for COVID-19 recovery.

On August 9, 2022, The Hollywood Critics Association partnered with Petco Love and Big Love Animal Rescue to turn their television awards ceremonies into a two-night rescue animal adoption event. “We hope to shine a spotlight on shelter dogs and help a few of them find their forever homes,” adds HCA Co-Founder, Ashley Menzel. “When you rescue a dog, they are forever grateful. Dogs know you saved them and they share their love unconditionally every single day. We are so glad to be hosting this adoption event as it is a cause that is very near and dear to our hearts.”

On August 30, 2022, The Hollywood Reporter reported that nine of the group's members had recently resigned, "roughly 7 percent of its membership tally just two weeks ago" as a result of one member's actions and ultimate removal "for violating numerous HCA bylaws, including harassment, bullying, slander, sharing member-only information with non-members and breaking the code of conduct." The claims made in the THR article were debunked in June of 2024 via court documents posted by Variety.

On June 2, 2023, The Hollywood Reporter revealed that HCA President Nikki Fowler had resigned from the organization. On June 14, 2023, The Wrap announced that the Hollywood Critics Association is restructuring and bringing in a Diversity, Equity and Inclusion advisor.

On August 28, 2023, the organization changed its name to Hollywood Creative Alliance with the guidance of corporate operation strategist Leslie Short of the Cavu Group. Under Short's instruction, the HCA announced plans to reform as a 501 c6 membership-based non-profit organization.

The restructure, handled by Menzel with the guidance of corporate operation strategist Leslie Short of the Cavu Group, included a mostly new board and an expansion of its membership scope, which it described as “critics, entertainment journalists, content creators, industry influencers and creatives.”

On October 4, 2023, Deadline reported that the Hollywood Creative Alliance (HCA) added new stunt performer and international categories. With the new categories, the HCA has said it aims to “promote stunt performers crucial role in bringing action-packed sequences to life on screen.” The organization has teamed with producer and editor David Sandeep Robert (Hollywood’s Hard Hitters), filmmaker Jason Strickland, and executive producer Leonard Shapiro to enact the changes.

=== Legal battle with Critics Choice Association ===
On January 30, 2020, the Critics Choice Association reached out to its membership "on advice of legal counse" after deeming it unacceptable for CCA members to also retain membership in the Hollywood Critics Association. The letter continued by stating, "The CCA will be protecting its rights in this matter. At this time you have the opportunity to choose to remain in the CCA. Simply confirm that you choose to do so and that you have resigned from HCA. And when it changes the offending name to something that reflects its laudable mission you can freely rejoin at that time, while remaining a CCA member in good standing."

On January 16, 2024, The Hollywood Reporter reported that the board of the CCA had enacted a new policy that prohibited members of the HCA from maintaining their membership in the CCA. The board explained in a message, "the reason CCA has taken this action is that we have evidence that a representative of the HCA has improperly suggested to at least one studio (and we suspect more) that it could influence Critics Choice Awards voting in a way that led that studio to reach out to CCA and request that action be taken to protect the integrity of our awards. Of course, that HCA threat was empty, but CCA cannot ignore this". As a result, members that wished to remain part of the CCA were required to contact the HCA and show proof that they "successfully resigned" from the organization.

On January 18, 2024, the HCA issued a statement responding to the CCA's new policy: "The recent statement made by the Critics Choice Association (CCA) regarding the Hollywood Creative Alliance (HCA) is factually inaccurate. At no time have we tried to influence the awards votes of our members or make any suggestion to talent or studios that we would or could exercise such influence. During our awards outreach to studios, networks, and personal representatives, we presented an opportunity to have their talent attend and/or present at our ceremonies. During these conversations, we acknowledged that our awards ceremonies took place during a key voting period for various organizations and noted that several of our members belonged to several guilds and organizations; ones that we champion and support".

On January 19, 2024, The Hollywood Reporter reported that HCA founder Scott Menzel sent an email on January 3 declaring: "It's important to note to ALL TALENT that the Critics Choice voting opens this weekend, and there are about 50 members who are part of both groups. Menzel also highlighted other organizations saying "there are several other members who are in BAFTA, SAG and the Academy…

On January 30, 2024, Variety revealed that the HCA is suing the Critics Choice Association for defamation in response to the org’s recent call for members to resign from the HCA in order to stay members of the CCA. On the same day, The Wrap noted that "the lawsuit accuses CCA of trade libel and defamation, violation of the Cartwright Act (California’s antitrust law), intentional interference with prospective economic advantage and violation of California’s unfair competition law."

On May 29, 2024, My News LA reported that Judge Eric Harmon heard arguments May 8 on the association’s anti-SLAPP motion, then took the case under submission and issued a final ruling on Tuesday. “In conclusion, evidence properly adduced by plaintiffs shows not only that the parties were competitors, but also that (the association) made the statements at issue here to advance (its) business,” the judge wrote, adding that the association cannot use the commercial business-speech exemption of the anti-SLAPP law to thwart the HCA’s allegations.

On June 21, 2024, Variety announced that The Hollywood Creative Alliance had ended its lawsuit against the Critics Choice Association, as both sides announced that they had reached an “amicable agreement." In a joint announcement between CCA CEO Joey Berlin and HCA CEO Scott Menzel, the two sides said that the Critics Choice Association will once again allow its members to also be a part of the Hollywood Creative Alliance. “An unfortunate misunderstanding has been straightened out, and we are happy to be moving forward in our journey to serve our members, audiences, and the entertainment community,” Berlin said.

== Astra Awards ==
=== Film ===
- 2017
- 2018
- 2019
- 2020
- 2021
- 2022
- 2023
- 2024

=== Midseason ===
- 2018
- 2019
- 2020
- 2021
- 2022
- 2023
- 2024
- 2025

=== TV ===
- 2021
- 2022
- 2023
- 2024
- 2025

=== Creative art ===
- 2022 (film)
- 2023 (film)
- 2023 (television)
- 2024 (film)
- 2025 (film and television)
