= The Woman King (soundtrack) =

The Woman King (Original Motion Picture Soundtrack)

Film score by Terence Blanchard
- Released: September 16, 2022
- Recorded: 2022
- Genre: Film score
- Length: 82:33
- Label: Milan
- Producer: Terence Blanchard

Terence Blanchard chronology
One Night in Miami... (2020)	The Woman King (2022)

Singles from The Woman King (Original Motion Picture Soundtrack)
- 1. "Keep Rising" Released: September 9, 2022

The Woman King (Original Motion Picture Soundtrack) is the soundtrack to the 2022 film of the same name, released on September 16, 2022 by Milan Records. The album featured mostly original score composed by Terence Blanchard, who produced a "heavy orchestral scores" mimicking that of the historical epics and African instruments that tune with the film's setting. The original song "Keep Rising" performed by Jessy Wilson and Angélique Kidjo released as a single on September 9, 2022.

== Development ==
The film marked Blanchard's first collaboration with Prince-Bythewood on her first film Love & Basketball (2000) and the television shows Shots Fired and Swagger. Speaking to GoldDerby magazine, Blanchard said "The first thing that I thought of was a scene after the battle, where they're coming back to the kingdom – that's actually where I started scoring the film". He scored the opening sequences, featuring a string orchestra and regional instruments including kalimba and kora, where "the beauty and the pageantry of this kingdom, that sets up everything else. So, for me, the music had to have that warm, familiar kind of resonance to it. I wanted to make it feel like this is a neighborhood that anybody would want to be a part of."

He had discussed about using African instruments to score the film, which he had a "lot of pushback as he said "while I thought it was appropriate to have African instruments I didn't want to just assume or implicate that people of color never played in orchestras". He did not want to "cheat the film by not having the full palette of colors to help tell the story". Hence Prince-Bythewood agreed Blanchard to use the orchestra to perform the score in the film. He referred using sweeping orchestral scores as did earlier in Braveheart and Gladiator (2000).

Blanchard quoted the dialogue, "There's an evil that they don't know is coming", which refers to the encroaching slave trade, and added "that is the juxtaposition of the music [...] Them walking to the kingdom and milling around — versus Nanisca, who's outside the kingdom and sees the reality of what's going on. There's a broad distinction between the two." He wanted to contrast and complement the spiritual and emotional vulnerability through the music.

Chorus played a major role in the score, fronted by jazz singer Dianne Reeves. Opining, the fact Blanchard said:

"When I started thinking about the Agojie women and how strong they were, it seems like that DNA carried over into the women that I grew up with. For me, there's this connection of the way I was raised and what I was looking at on screen. And growing up in a church, that music is a very communal music and a very powerful music. In a weird way, it feels like I was reconnected to something that I was taken away from. ... [It] just felt familiar, in a way that I can't explain. I wanted the music to be culturally connected to Dahomey but still spiritually connected to our lineage."

== Track listing ==
No.	Title	Performer(s)	Length
1.	"Dahomey at a Crossroads"		1:28
2.	"Enemy Village"		2:35
3.	"Stronger Warriors"		0:46
4.	"Road to Abomey"		2:01
5.	"Agojie Return"		1:37
6.	"Entering Palace"		1:15
7.	"Oyo Warriors to the Village"		1:05
8.	"The King's Entrance"		0:37
9.	"You are Called to Join the King's Guard"		2:04
10.	"Tribute to the King"	South African Choir	0:51
11.	"Agojie Training Montage"		2:06
12.	"Nawi and Izogie (Part 1)"		0:54
13.	"Nawi Trains Alone"		0:40
14.	"The Oyo Arrive"		1:54
15.	"Sometimes a Mouse Can Take Down an Elephant"		1:23
16.	"Choosing Agojie for the Oyo"		1:40
17.	"Malik Arrives"		1:18
18.	"We Bring Tribute"		2:59
19.	"With One Purpose"		1:20
20.	"Palm Oil"		1:30
21.	"Through the Jungle"		1:23
22.	"Malik and Santo Enter Abomey"		0:41
23.	"Final Test"		2:27
24.	"To the Vector"		1:16
25.	"To Be Great You Must Focus"		1:52
26.	"A Shark's Tooth"		2:57
27.	"Agojie It's War"	Jabu Chirindah; South African Choir	2:09
28.	"Nawi Learns the Truth"		0:50
29.	"The Blade of Freedom"		0:38
30.	"Oyo Battle"		7:17
31.	"You Fought Well"		2:57
32.	"Nawi and Izogie (Part 2)"		3:22
33.	"I Have to Try to Save Her"		2:02
34.	"There Will Be No Prisoners"		1:46
35.	"Blood of Our Sisters"	Nokukhanya Dlamini; South African Choir	1:02
36.	"The Final Battle"		5:28
37.	"Nawi and Malik"		1:00
38.	"Coronation"		2:31
39.	"Whiskey for Izogie"		2:47
40.	"Mother Will You Dance"		1:28
41.	"The Woman King"		2:47
42.	"Traditional Benin Song"	Sheila Atim; Lashana Lynch; Adrienne Warren	0:36
43.	"Keep Rising"	Jessy Wilson; Angélique Kidjo	3:14
Total length:			82:33

== Reception ==
Music critic Jonathan Broxton of Movie Music UK wrote "The Woman King is an outstanding score. It's a rich tapestry of themes and motifs, with one especially prominent one that will remain in the memory. Blanchard's use of native percussion and African-inspired vocals throughout the score is especially impressive, and the way he blends these themes and textures into the excellent action sequences is really quite superb. Fans of scores like The Lion King and Black Panther will be especially enthralled by what Terence Blanchard has done here but, honestly, unless you have some sort of knee-jerk aversion to music that has influences from Africa, I can see this having a generally broad appeal – one that can carry him all the way to the Academy Awards."

Filmtracks.com wrote "The Woman King is an admirable career achievement for Blanchard and provides its topic with appropriately intelligent dignity and scope." The review further continued "The absence of larger purpose or clear organization to all of these wayward melodies causes some consternation for listeners not enamored solely by the scope of performance sounds in The Woman King. Those stylings are fantastic, and those who don't particularly care about melodic details will find the score to be a magnificent treat of performances spanning Western orchestral conventions and West African history. The recording's presentation is dry and does at times lack depth of layers, the absence of counterpoint lines a particular detraction. On its album, the 74 minutes of score spread over 38 cues isn't arranged for an optimal listening experience, those contents requiring rearrangement and combination for a half hour of very engaging highlights."

Robert Daniels of RogerEbert.com wrote "the evocative score by Terence Blanchard and Lebo M. gives voice to the Agojie's fighting spirit". Kambole Campbell of Empire wrote "Terence Blanchard's score, too, threatens to undermine the quieter moments with overwrought schmaltz (a shame, given the composer's usual handle on drama)." Mae Abdulbaki of Screen Rant mentioned the score as "hypnotic".

== Accolades ==
Accolades received by Top Gun: Maverick
Award	Date of ceremony	Category	Recipient(s)	Result	Ref.
Grammy Awards	February 5, 2023	Best Song Written for Visual Media	Angélique Kidjo, Jeremy Lutito and Jessy Wilson for "Keep Rising"	Nominated	
Hollywood Music in Media Awards	November 16, 2022	Best Original Score in a Feature Film	Terence Blanchard	Won	
NAACP Image Awards	February 25, 2023	Outstanding Soundtrack/Compilation Album	Terence Blanchard	Nominated	
Satellite Awards	February 11, 2023	Best Original Score	Terence Blanchard	Nominated	
