= 27th Satellite Awards =

2023 awards ceremony for film and television

- Date: March 3, 2023
- Site: The Beverly Hills Hotel, Beverly Hills, California

Highlights
- Most wins: Film: Top Gun: Maverick (5); Television: Barry (2)
- Most nominations: Film: Top Gun: Maverick (10); Television: Better Call Saul / The Righteous Gemstones (4)
- Best Motion Picture – Drama: Top Gun: Maverick
- Best Motion Picture – Comedy or Musical: Everything Everywhere All at Once
- Best Television Series – Drama: Billions
- Best Television Series – Comedy or Musical: Barry
- Best Miniseries & Limited Series: Under the Banner of Heaven

The 27th Satellite Awards is an award ceremony honoring the year's outstanding performers, films and television shows, presented by the International Press Academy.

The nominations were announced on December 8, 2022. The winners were announced on March 3, 2023. The awards presentation took place at the Beverly Hills Hotel.

Top Gun: Maverick led the film nominations with 10, followed by Babylon, Elvis and The Fabelmans with nine each. Better Call Saul's sixth and final season, and The Righteous Gemstones led the television nominations with four each. Six of the special achievement award recipients were announced on January 13, 2023; however, the Mary Pickford Award recipient was announced on February 22, 2023.

== Special achievement awards ==
- Auteur Award (for singular vision and unique artistic control over the elements of production) – Martin McDonagh
- Honorary Satellite Award – RRR
- Humanitarian Award (for making a difference in the lives of those in the artistic community and beyond) – Joe Mantegna
- Mary Pickford Award (for outstanding artistic contribution to the entertainment industry) – Diane Warren
- Nikola Tesla Award (for visionary achievement in filmmaking technology) – Ryan Tudhope
- Breakthrough Performance Award – Bhavin Rabari (Last Film Show)
- Stunt Performance Award – Casey O'Neill (Top Gun: Maverick)
- Ensemble: Motion Picture – Glass Onion: A Knives Out Mystery
- Ensemble: Television – Winning Time: The Rise of the Lakers Dynasty

== Motion picture winners and nominees ==
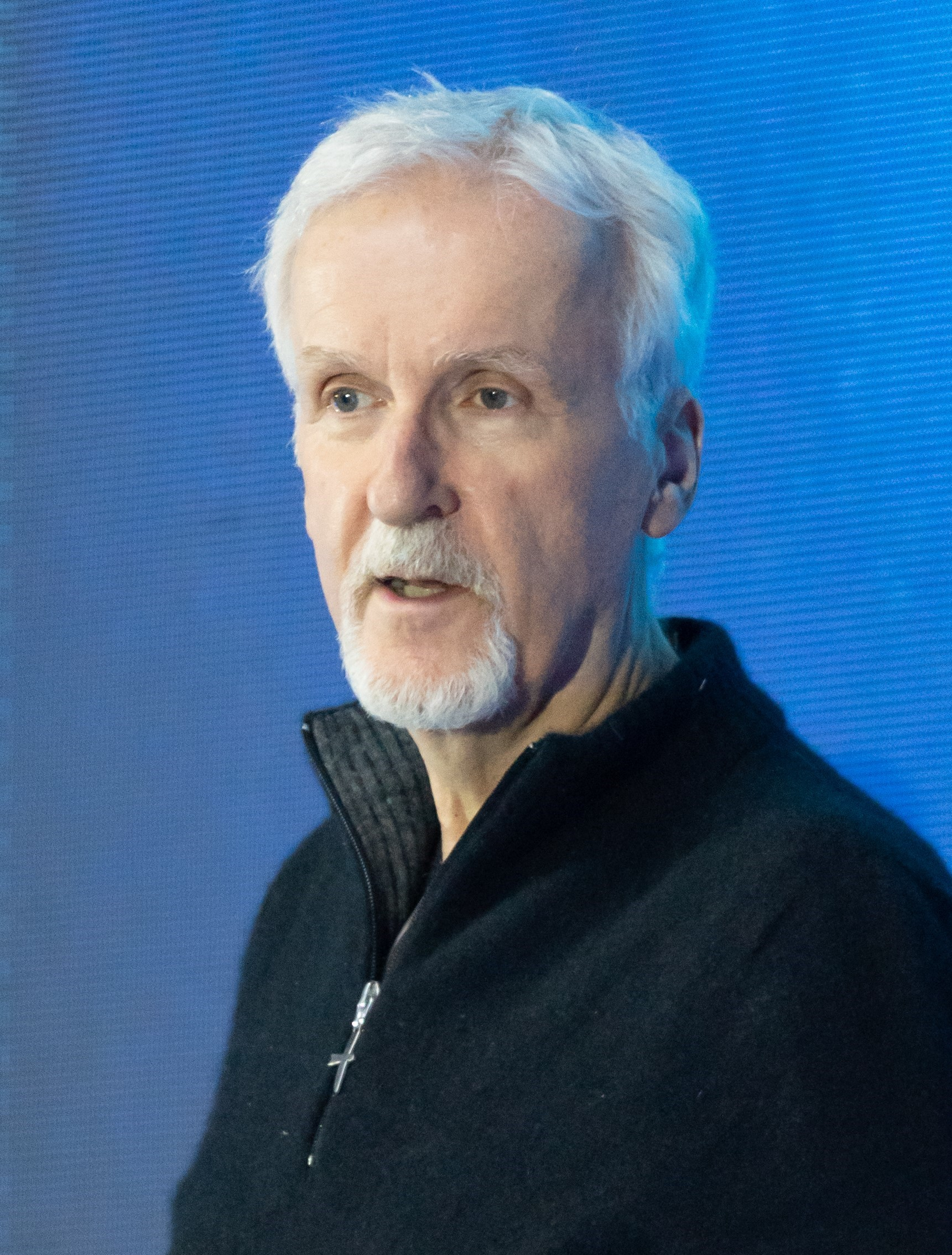
James Cameron, Best Director winner

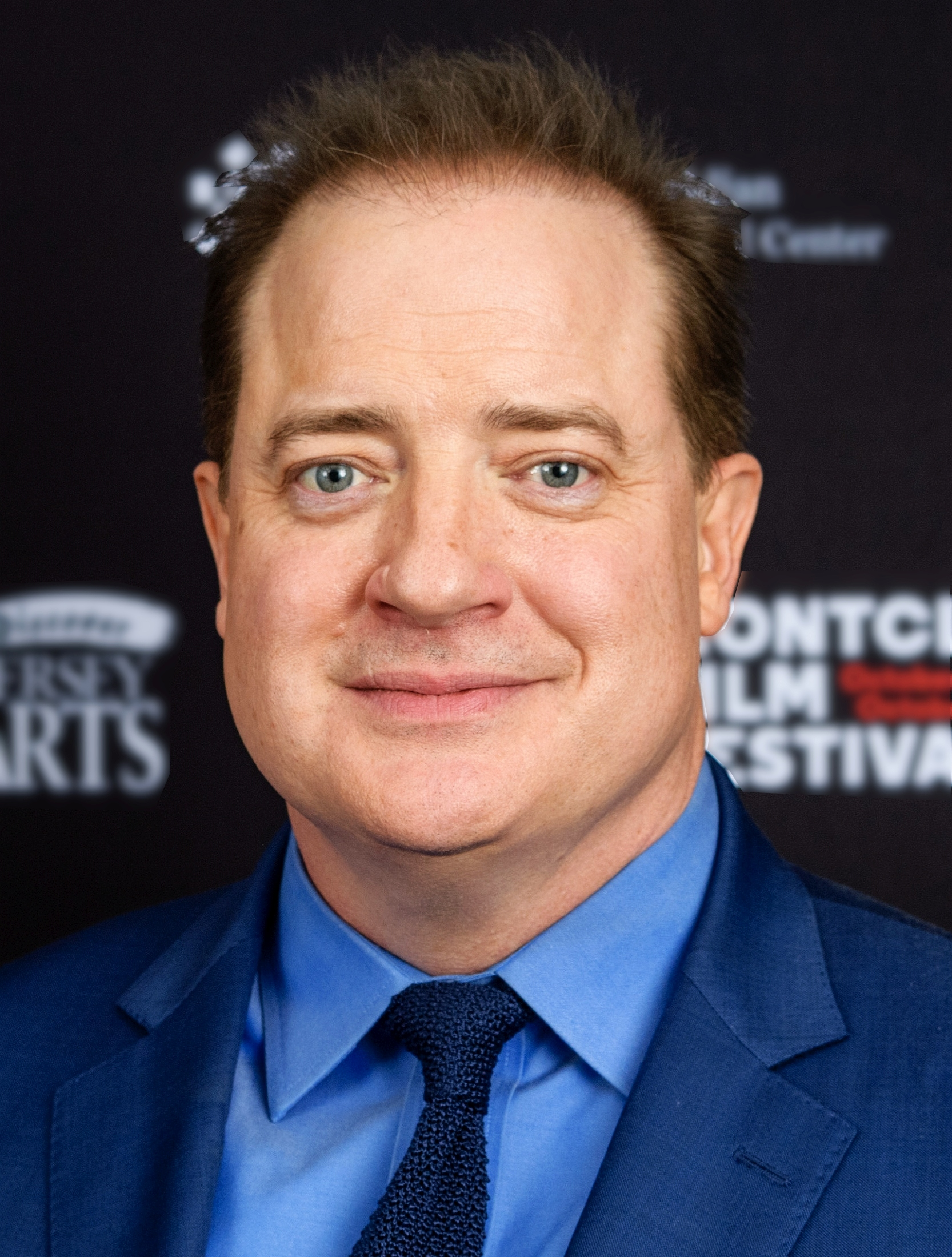
Brendan Fraser, Best Actor in a Motion Picture – Drama winner

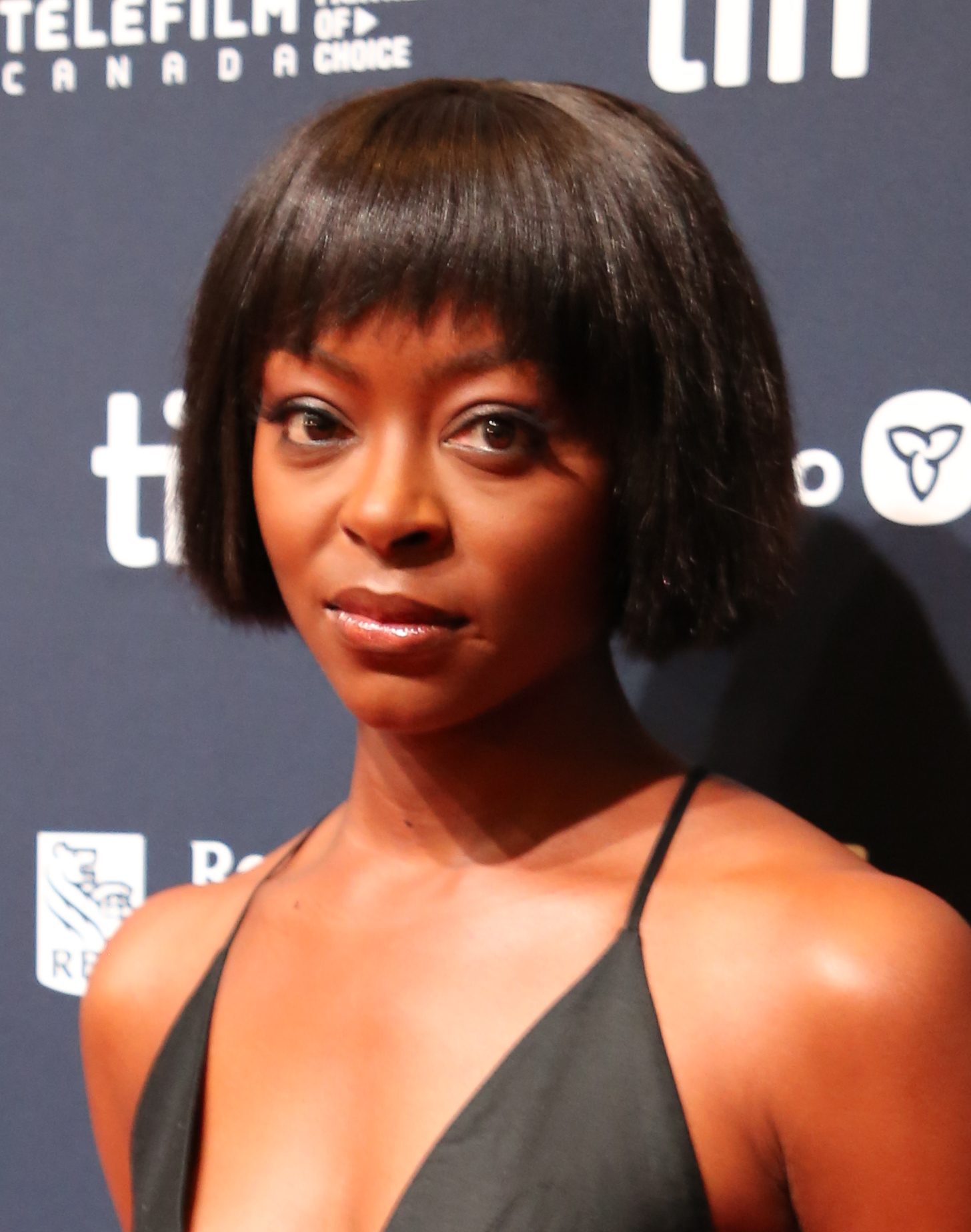
Danielle Deadwyler, Best Actress in a Motion Picture – Drama winner

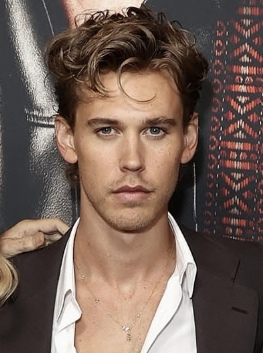
Austin Butler, Best Actor in a Motion Picture – Comedy or Musical winner

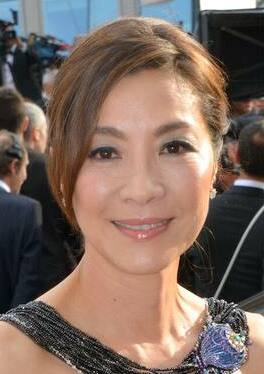
Michelle Yeoh, Best Actress in a Motion Picture – Comedy or Musical winner

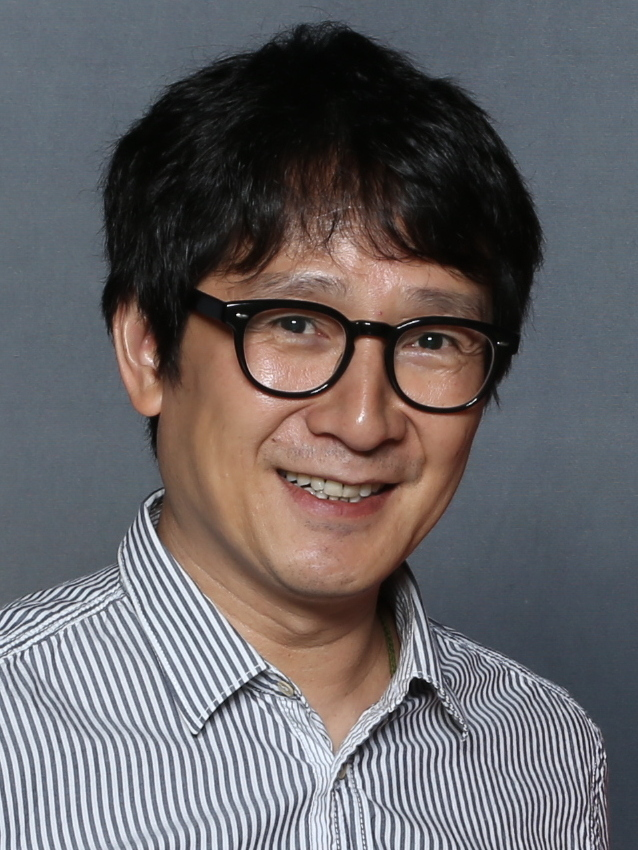
Ke Huy Quan, Best Actor in a Supporting Role winner

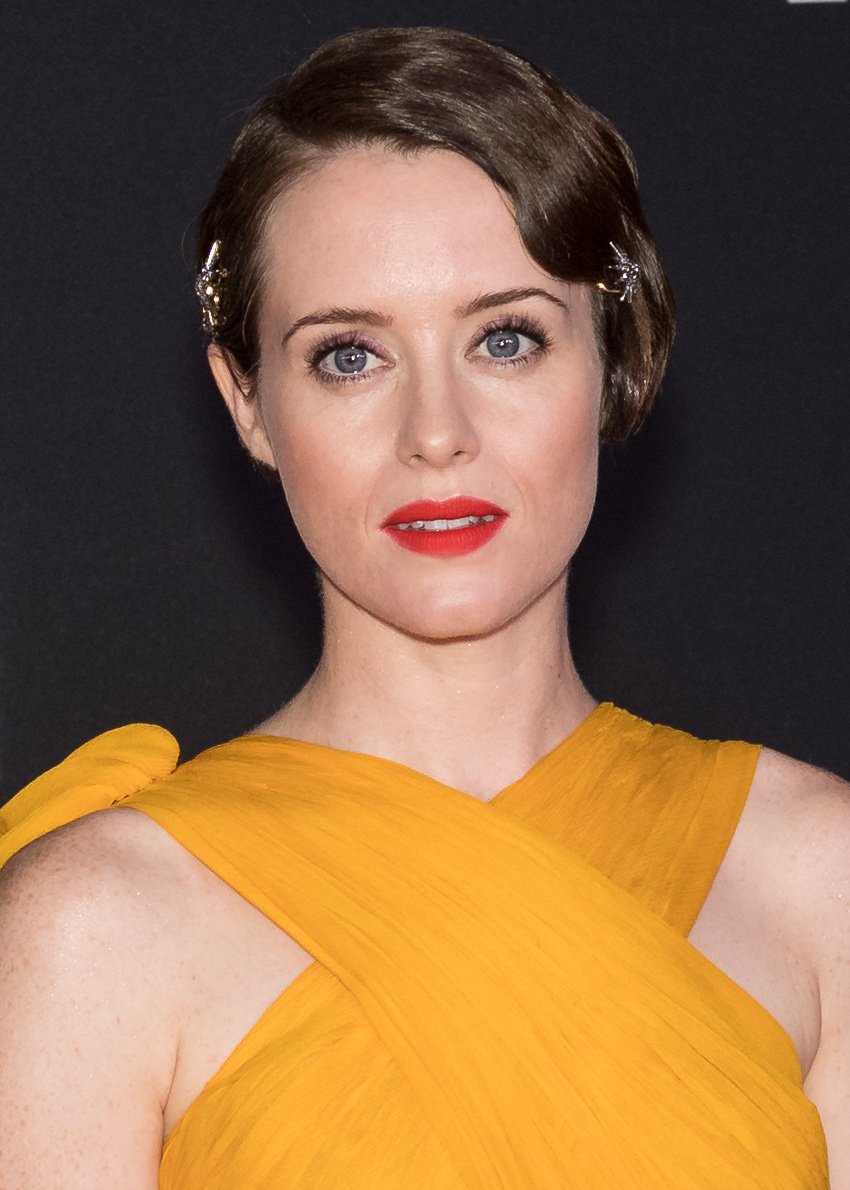
Claire Foy, Best Actress in a Supporting Role winner

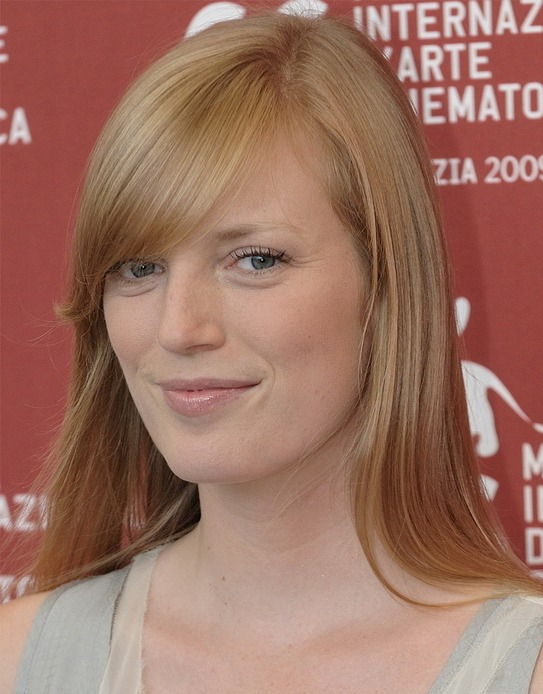
Sarah Polley, Best Adapted Screenplay winner

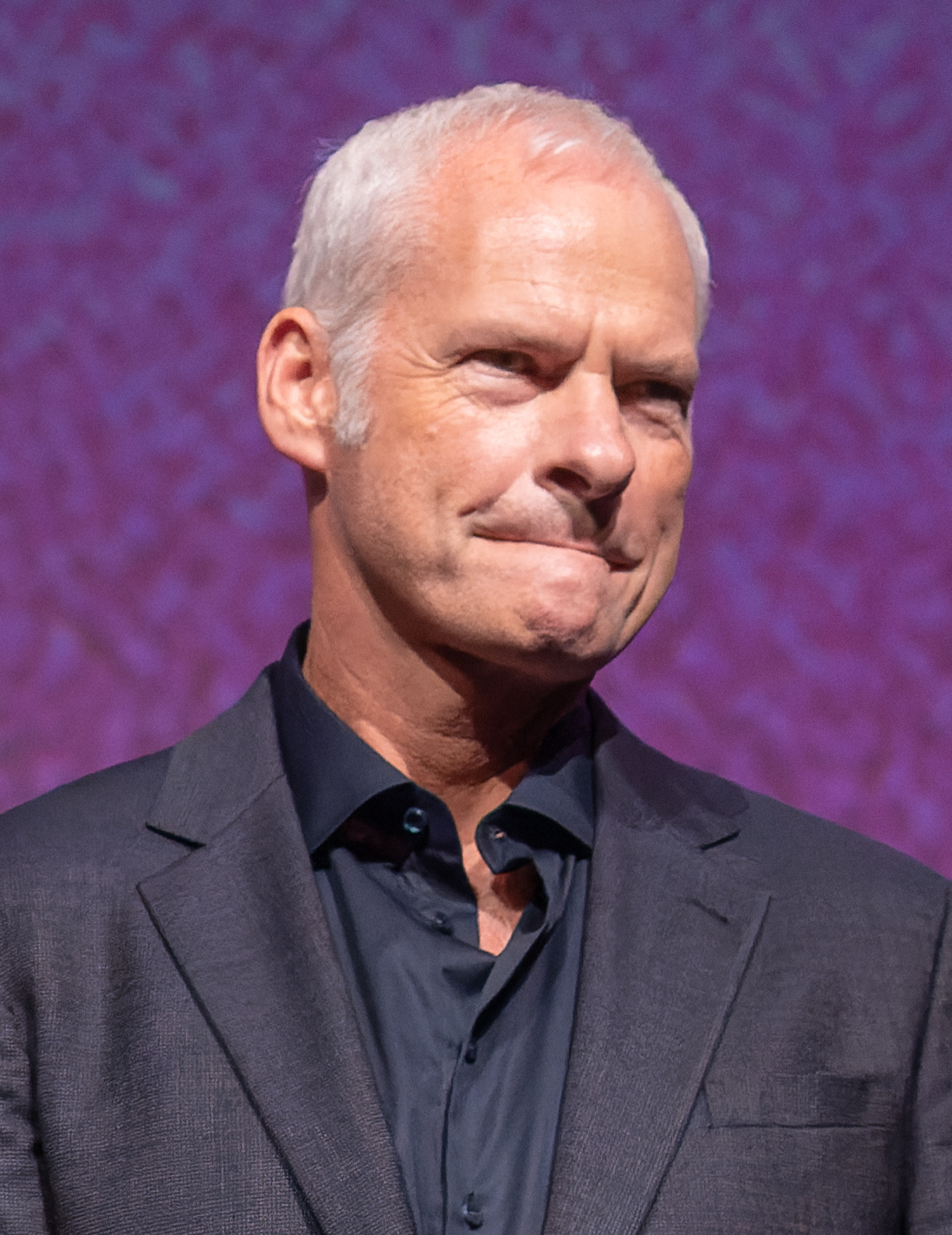
Martin McDonagh, Best Original Screenplay winner

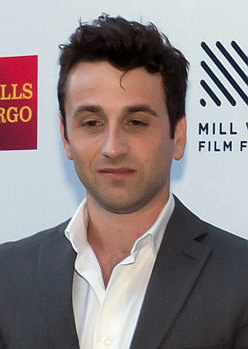
Justin Hurwitz, Best Original Score winner

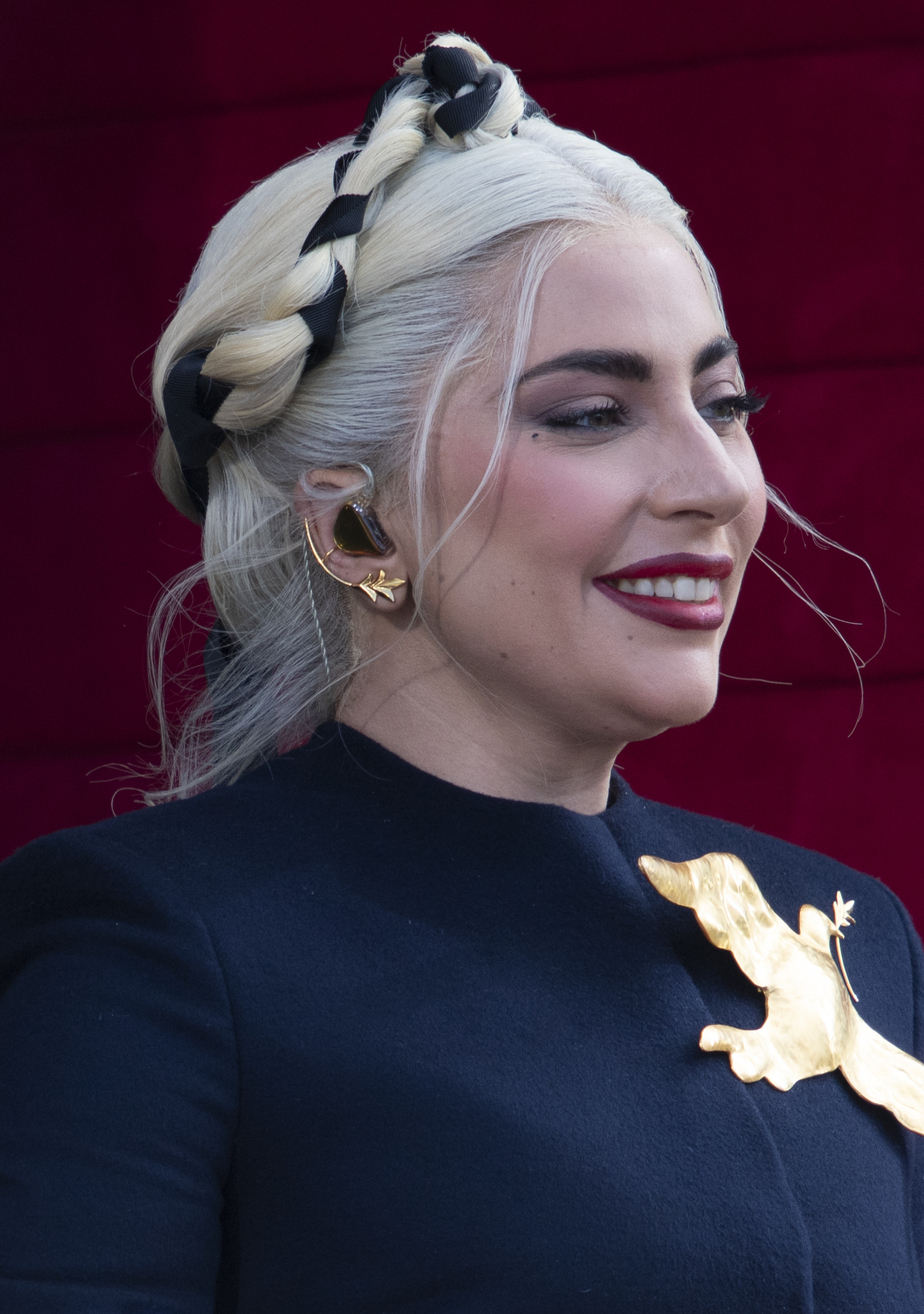
Lady Gaga, Best Original Song winner

Winners are listed first and highlighted in bold.

Best Motion Picture – Drama	Best Motion Picture – Comedy or Musical
**Top Gun: Maverick**; Avatar: The Way of Water; Black Panther: Wakanda Forever; The Fabelmans; Living; Tár; Till; Women Talking	**Everything Everywhere All at Once**; The Banshees of Inisherin; Elvis; Glass Onion: A Knives Out Mystery; RRR; Triangle of Sadness
Best Motion Picture – Animated or Mixed Media	Best Director
**Marcel the Shell with Shoes On**; The Bad Guys; Guillermo del Toro's Pinocchio; Inu-Oh; Turning Red	**James Cameron – Avatar: The Way of Water**; Joseph Kosinski – Top Gun: Maverick; Baz Luhrmann – Elvis; Martin McDonagh – The Banshees of Inisherin; Sarah Polley – Women Talking; Steven Spielberg – The Fabelmans
Best Actor in a Motion Picture – Drama	Best Actress in a Motion Picture – Drama
**Brendan Fraser – The Whale as Charlie**; Tom Cruise – Top Gun: Maverick as Captain Pete "Maverick" Mitchell; Hugh Jackman – The Son as Peter Miller; Gabriel LaBelle – The Fabelmans as Sammy Fabelman; Bill Nighy – Living as Mr. Williams; Mark Wahlberg – Father Stu as Father Stuart "Stu" Long	**Danielle Deadwyler – Till as Mamie Till-Mobley**; Cate Blanchett – Tár as Lydia Tár; Jessica Chastain – The Good Nurse as Amy Loughren; Viola Davis – The Woman King as General Nanisca; Vicky Krieps – Corsage as Empress Elisabeth; Michelle Williams – The Fabelmans as Mitzi Fabelman
Best Actor in a Motion Picture – Comedy or Musical	Best Actress in a Motion Picture – Comedy or Musical
**Austin Butler – Elvis as Elvis Presley**; Diego Calva – Babylon as Manuel "Manny" Torres; Daniel Craig – Glass Onion: A Knives Out Mystery as Benoit Blanc; Colin Farrell – The Banshees of Inisherin as Pádraic Súilleabháin; Ralph Fiennes – The Menu as Chef Slowik; Adam Sandler – Hustle as Stanley Sugerman	**Michelle Yeoh – Everything Everywhere All at Once as Evelyn Quan Wang**; Janelle Monáe – Glass Onion: A Knives Out Mystery as Helen Brand / Cassandra "Andi" Brand; Margot Robbie – Babylon as Nellie LaRoy; Emma Thompson – Good Luck to You, Leo Grande as Nancy Stokes / Susan Robinson
Best Actor in a Supporting Role	Best Actress in a Supporting Role
**Ke Huy Quan – Everything Everywhere All at Once as Waymond Wang**; Paul Dano – The Fabelmans as Burt Fabelman; Brendan Gleeson – The Banshees of Inisherin as Colm Doherty; Eddie Redmayne – The Good Nurse as Charlie Cullen; Jeremy Strong – Armageddon Time as Irving Graff; Ben Whishaw – Women Talking as August Epp	**Claire Foy – Women Talking as Salome Friesen**; Angela Bassett – Black Panther: Wakanda Forever as Queen Ramonda; Kerry Condon – The Banshees of Inisherin as Siobhán Súilleabháin; Jamie Lee Curtis – Everything Everywhere All at Once as Deirdre Beaubeirdre; Dolly de Leon – Triangle of Sadness as Abigail; Jean Smart – Babylon as Elinor St. John
Best Original Screenplay	Best Adapted Screenplay
**The Banshees of Inisherin – Martin McDonagh**; Close – Lukas Dhont and Angelo Tijssens; Everything Everywhere All at Once – Daniel Kwan and Daniel Scheinert; The Fabelmans – Tony Kushner and Steven Spielberg; Tár – Todd Field; Triangle of Sadness – Ruben Östlund	**Women Talking – Sarah Polley**; Glass Onion: A Knives Out Mystery – Rian Johnson; Living – Kazuo Ishiguro; She Said – Rebecca Lenkiewicz; Top Gun: Maverick – Peter Craig, Ehren Kruger, Justin Marks, Christopher McQuarrie, and Eric Warren Singer; The Whale – Samuel D. Hunter
Best Motion Picture – Documentary	Best Motion Picture – International
**Fire of Love**; All That Breathes; All the Beauty and the Bloodshed; Descendant; Good Night Oppy; Moonage Daydream; The Return of Tanya Tucker: Featuring Brandi Carlile; The Territory; Young Plato	**Argentina, 1985 (Argentina)**; Bardo (Mexico); Close (Belgium); Corsage (Austria); Decision to Leave (South Korea); Holy Spider (Denmark); The Quiet Girl (Ireland); War Sailor (Norway)
Best Cinematography	Best Film Editing
**Top Gun: Maverick – Claudio Miranda**; Avatar: The Way of Water – Russell Carpenter; Babylon – Linus Sandgren; The Banshees of Inisherin – Ben Davis; Elvis – Mandy Walker; Empire of Light – Roger Deakins	**Everything Everywhere All at Once – Paul Rogers**; Elvis – Jonathan Redmond and Matt Villa; The Fabelmans – Sarah Broshar and Michael Khan; Tár – Monika Willi; Top Gun: Maverick – Eddie Hamilton; The Woman King – Terilyn A. Shropshire
Best Costume Design	Best Production Design
**Babylon – Mary Zophres**; Black Panther: Wakanda Forever – Ruth E. Carter; Elvis – Catherine Martin; Empire of Light – Alexandra Byrne; Living – Sandy Powell; The Woman King – Gersha Phillips	**Babylon – Florencia Martin and Anthony Carlino**; Avatar: The Way of Water – Dylan Cole and Ben Procter; Elvis – Catherine Martin and Karen Murphy; The Fabelmans – Rick Carter; A Love Song – Juliana Barreto Barreto; RRR – Sabu Cyril
Best Original Score	Best Original Song
**Babylon – Justin Hurwitz**; The Banshees of Inisherin – Carter Burwell; The Fabelmans – John Williams; Top Gun: Maverick – Lorne Balfe, Harold Faltermeyer, Lady Gaga, and Hans Zimmer; The Woman King – Terence Blanchard; Women Talking – Hildur Guðnadóttir	**"Hold My Hand" from Top Gun: Maverick – Lady Gaga**; "Applause" from Tell It Like a Woman – Diane Warren; "Carolina" from Where the Crawdads Sing – Taylor Swift; "Lift Me Up" from Black Panther: Wakanda Forever – Rihanna; "Naatu Naatu" from RRR – Kaala Bhairava, M. M. Keeravani, and Rahul Sipligunj; "Vegas" from Elvis – Doja Cat
Best Sound (Editing and Mixing)	Best Visual Effects
**Top Gun: Maverick – James H. Mather, Al Nelson, Bjorn Schroeder, Mark Taylor, and Mark Weingarten**; Avatar: The Way of Water – Dick Bernstein, Christopher Boyes, Michael Hedges, Julian Howarth, Gary Summers, and Gwendolyn Yates Whittle; Babylon – Ai-Ling Lee, Mildred Iatrou Morgan, Steve Morrow, and Andy Nelson; Elvis – Michael Keller, David Lee, Andy Nelson, and Wayne Pashley; RRR – Boloy Kumar Doloi, Rahul Karpe, and Raghunath Kemisetty; The Woman King – Tony Lamberti, Derek Mansvelt, Kevin O'Connell, and Becky Sullivan	**Avatar: The Way of Water – Richie Baneham, Daniel Barrett, Joe Letteri, and Eric Saindon**; Babylon – Jay Cooper, Ebrahim Jahromi, Kevin Martel, and Elia Popov; The Batman – Russell Earl, Anders Langlands, Dan Lemmon, and Dominic Tuohy; Good Night Oppy – Ivan Busquets, Marko Chulev, Abishek Nair, and Steven Nichols; RRR – V. Srinivas Mohan; Top Gun: Maverick – Scott R. Fisher, Seth Hill, Bryan Litson, and Ryan Tudhope

=== Films with multiple nominations ===
Nominations	Films
10	Top Gun: Maverick
9	Babylon
9	Elvis
9	The Fabelmans
8	The Banshees of Inisherin
6	Avatar: The Way of Water
6	Everything Everywhere All at Once
6	Women Talking
5	RRR
5	The Woman King
4	Black Panther: Wakanda Forever
4	Glass Onion: A Knives Out Mystery
4	Living
4	Tár
3	Triangle of Sadness
2	Close
2	Corsage
2	Empire of Light
2	Good Night Oppy
2	The Good Nurse
2	Till
2	The Whale

=== Films with multiple wins ===
Wins	Films
5	Top Gun: Maverick
4	Everything Everywhere All at Once
3	Babylon
2	Avatar: The Way of Water
2	Women Talking

== Television winners and nominees ==
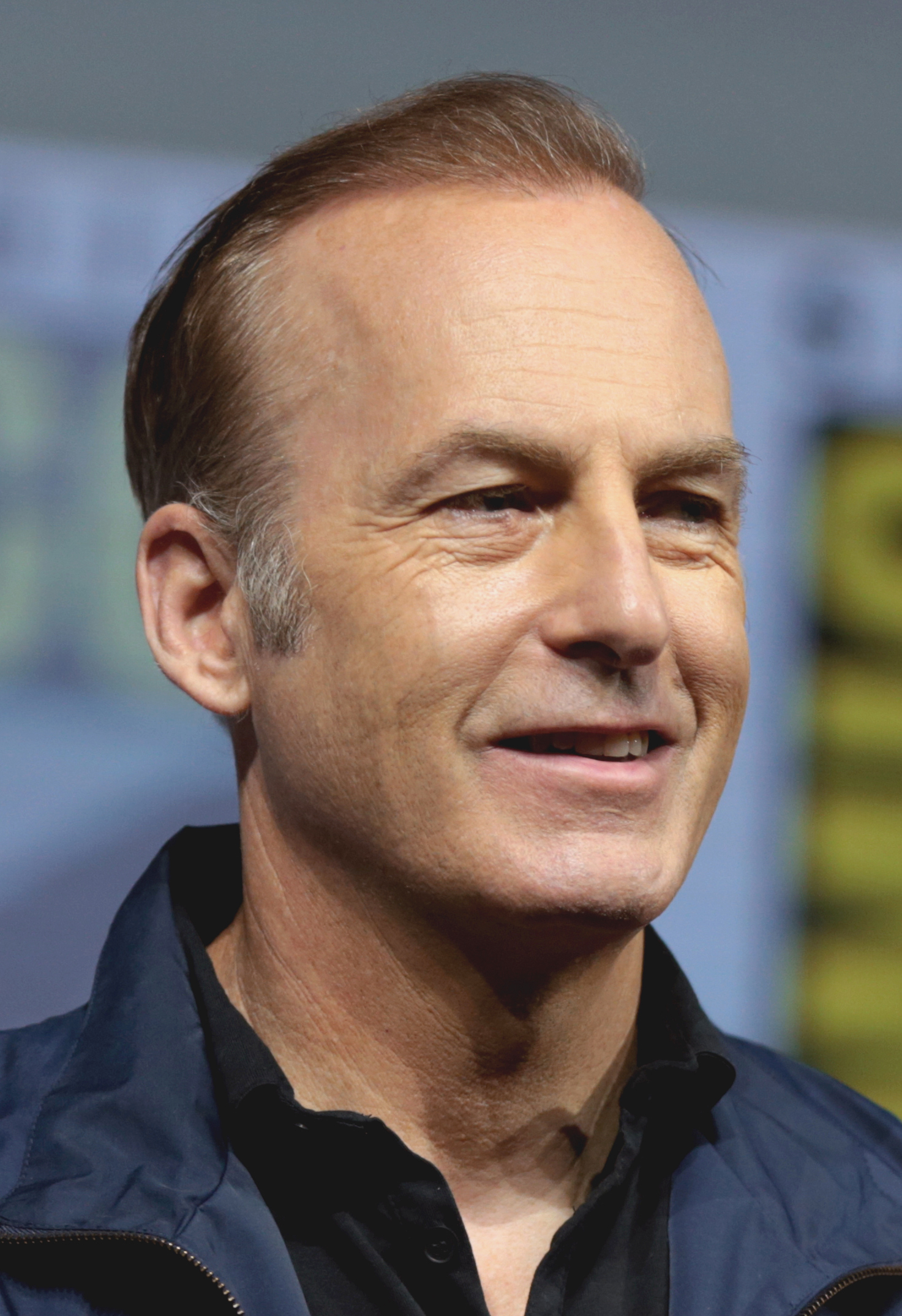
Bob Odenkirk, Best Actor in a Drama or Genre Series winner

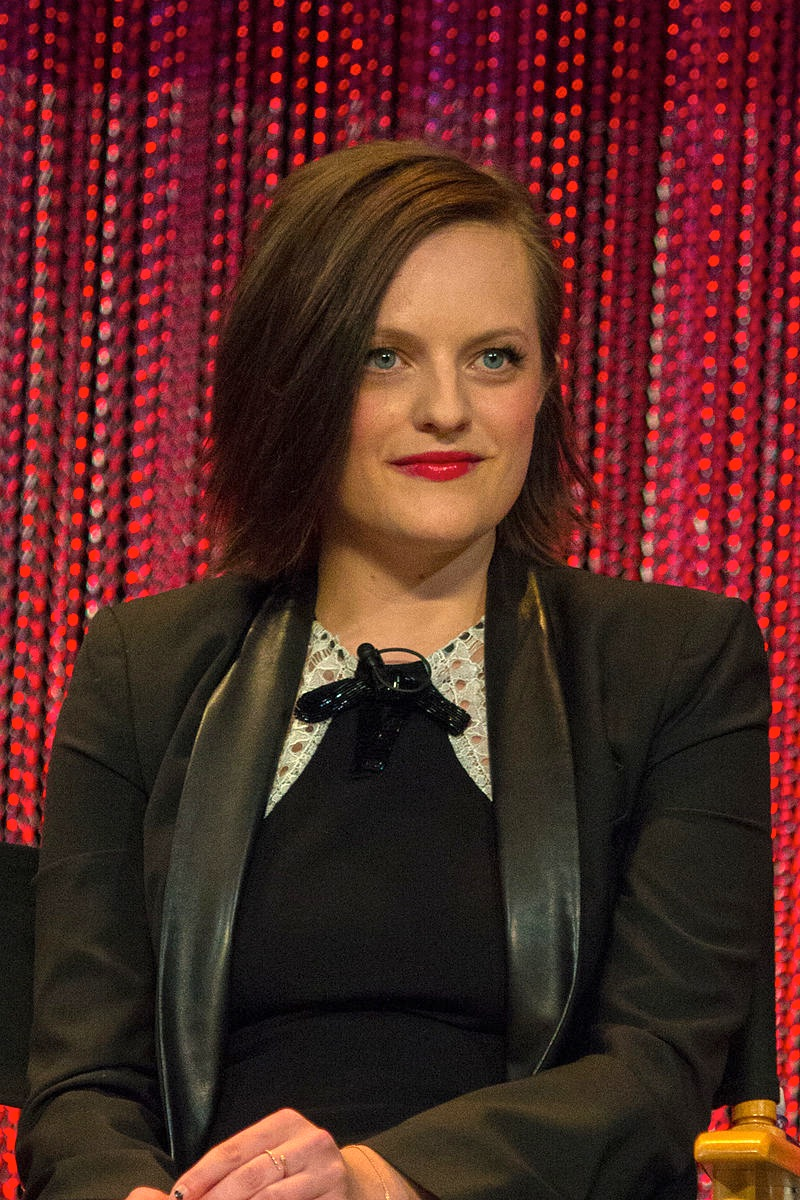
Elisabeth Moss, Best Actress in a Drama or Genre Series winner

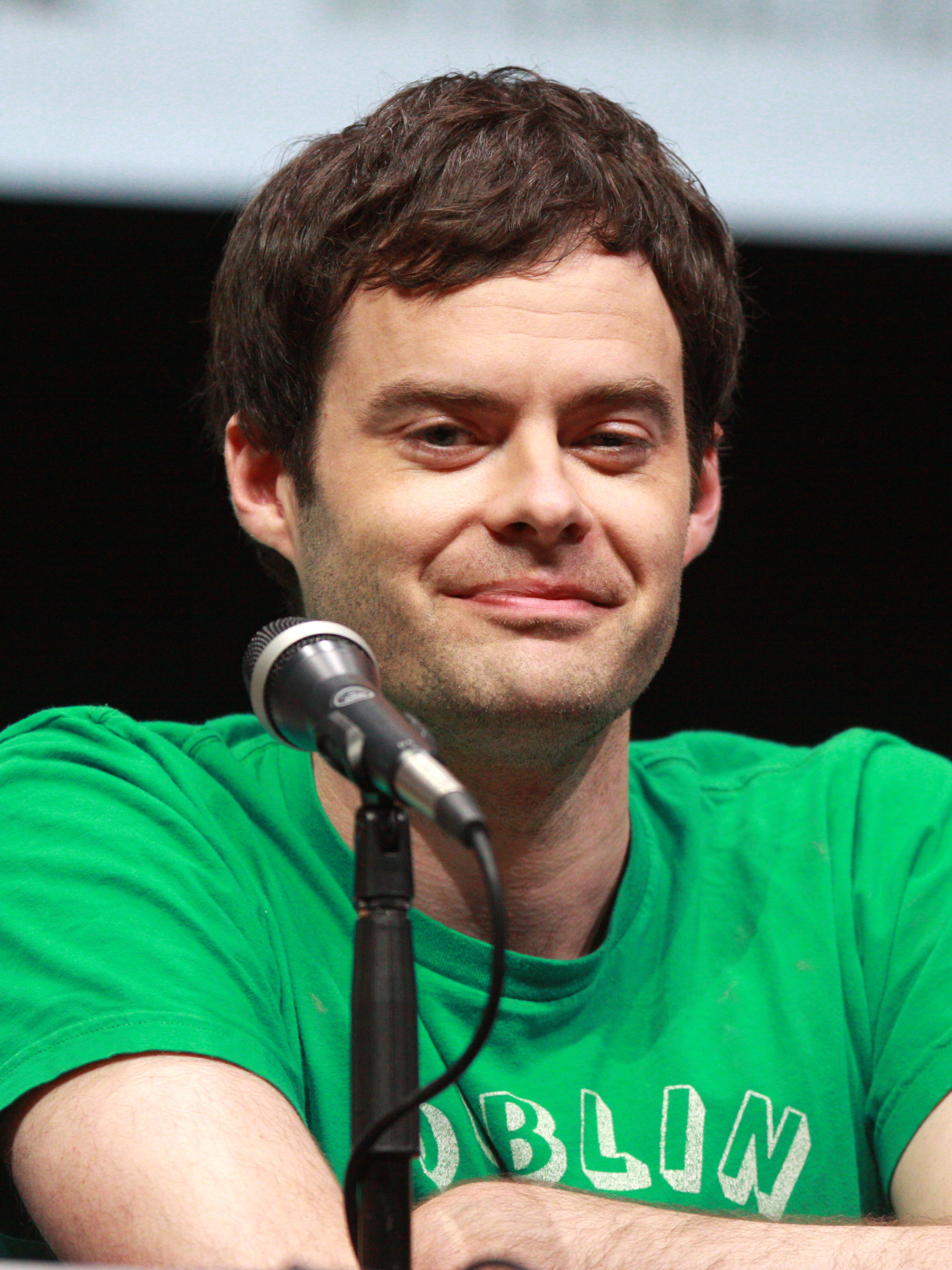
Bill Hader, Best Actor in a Comedy or Musical Series winner

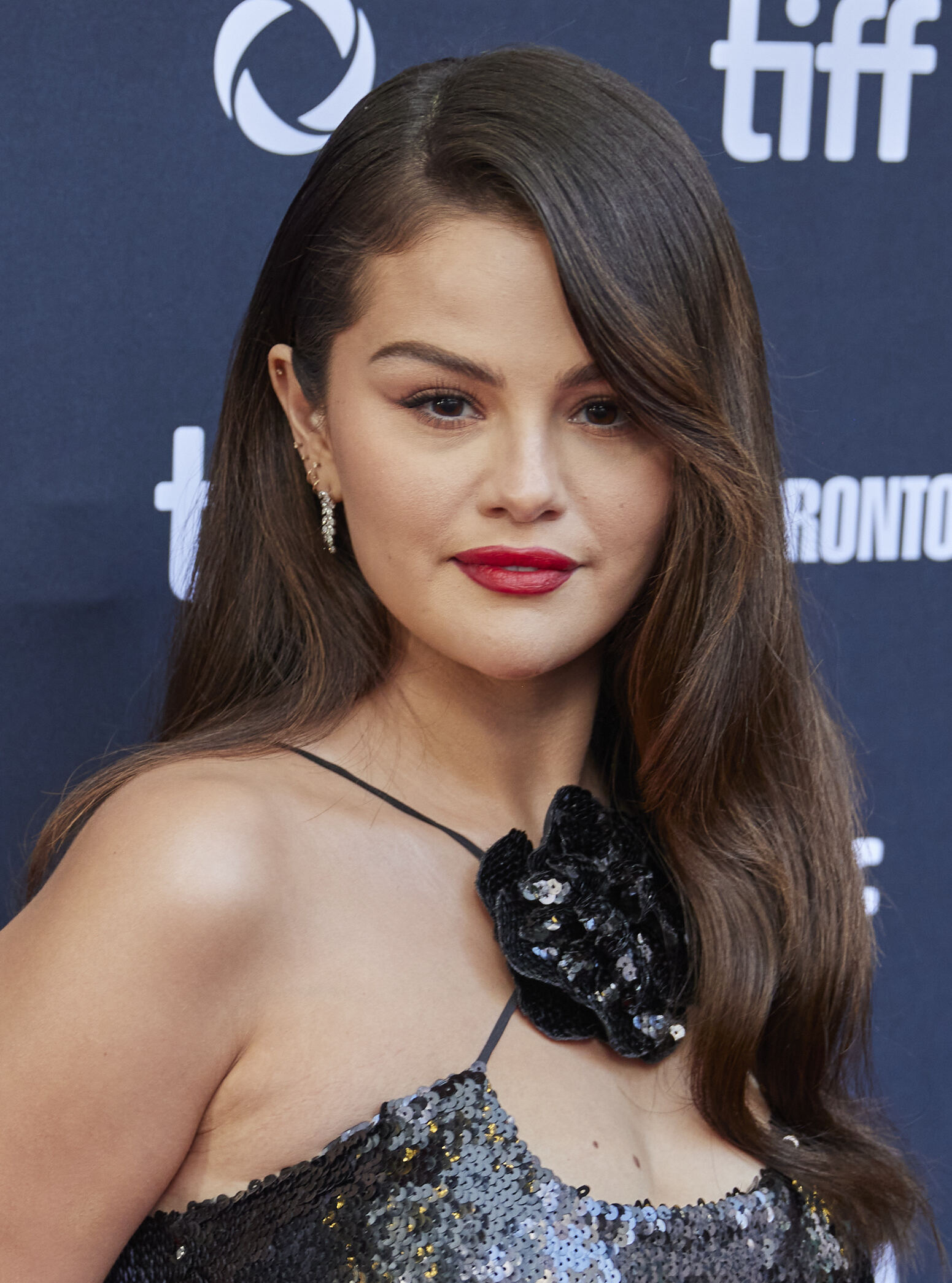
Selena Gomez, Best Actress in a Comedy or Musical Series winner

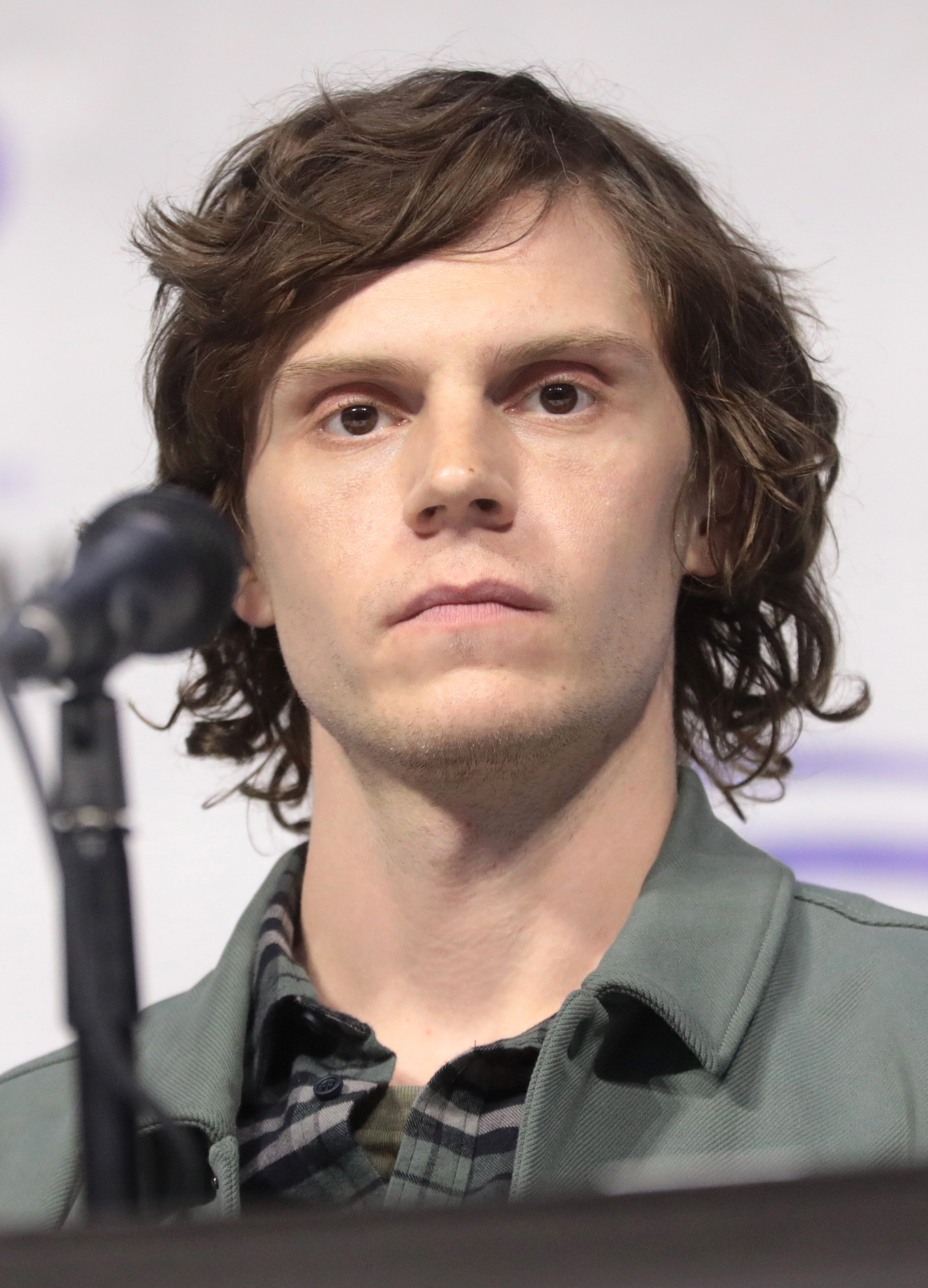
Evan Peters, Best Actor in a Miniseries, Limited Series, or Motion Picture Made for Television winner

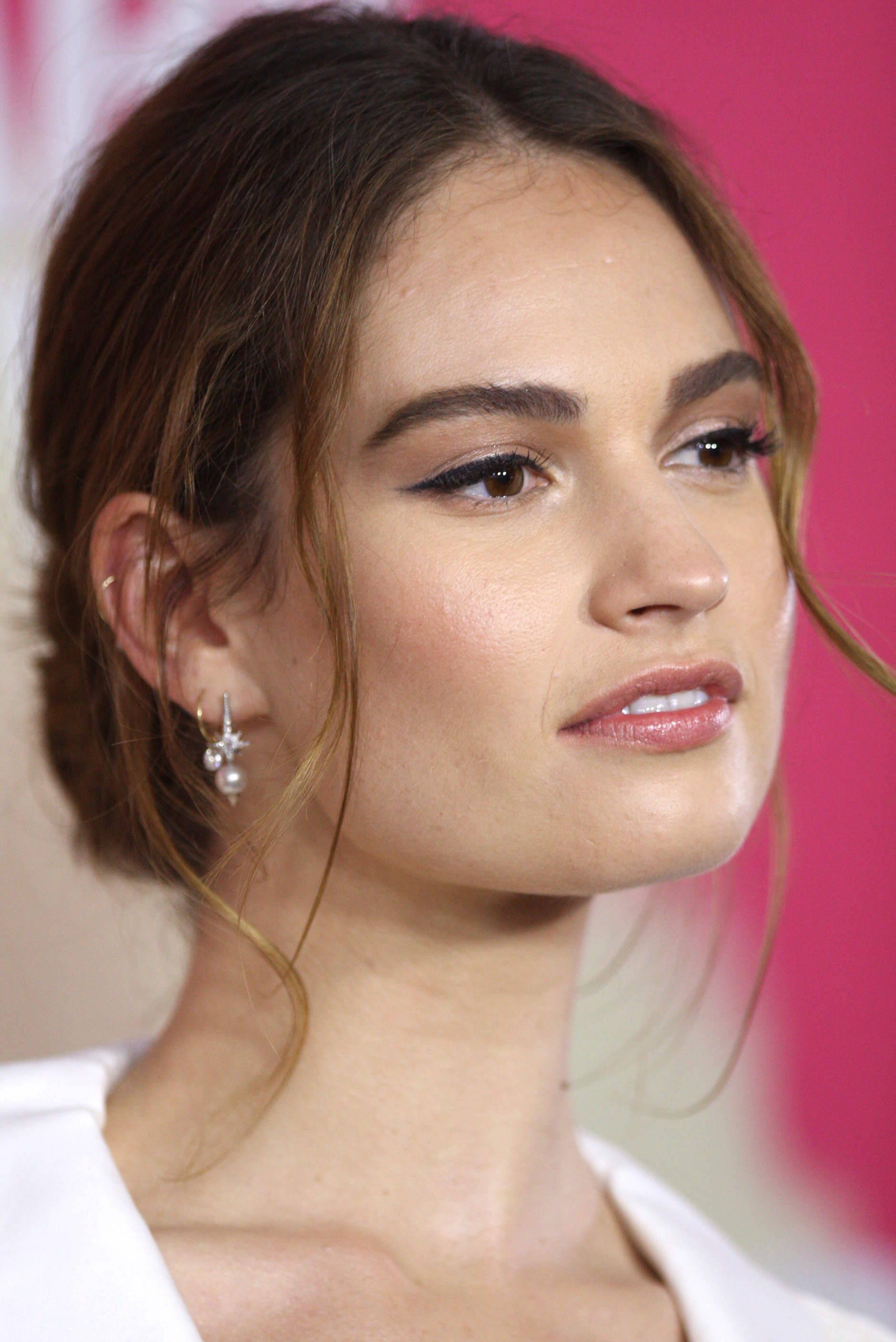
Lily James, Best Actress in a Miniseries, Limited Series, or Motion Picture Made for Television winner

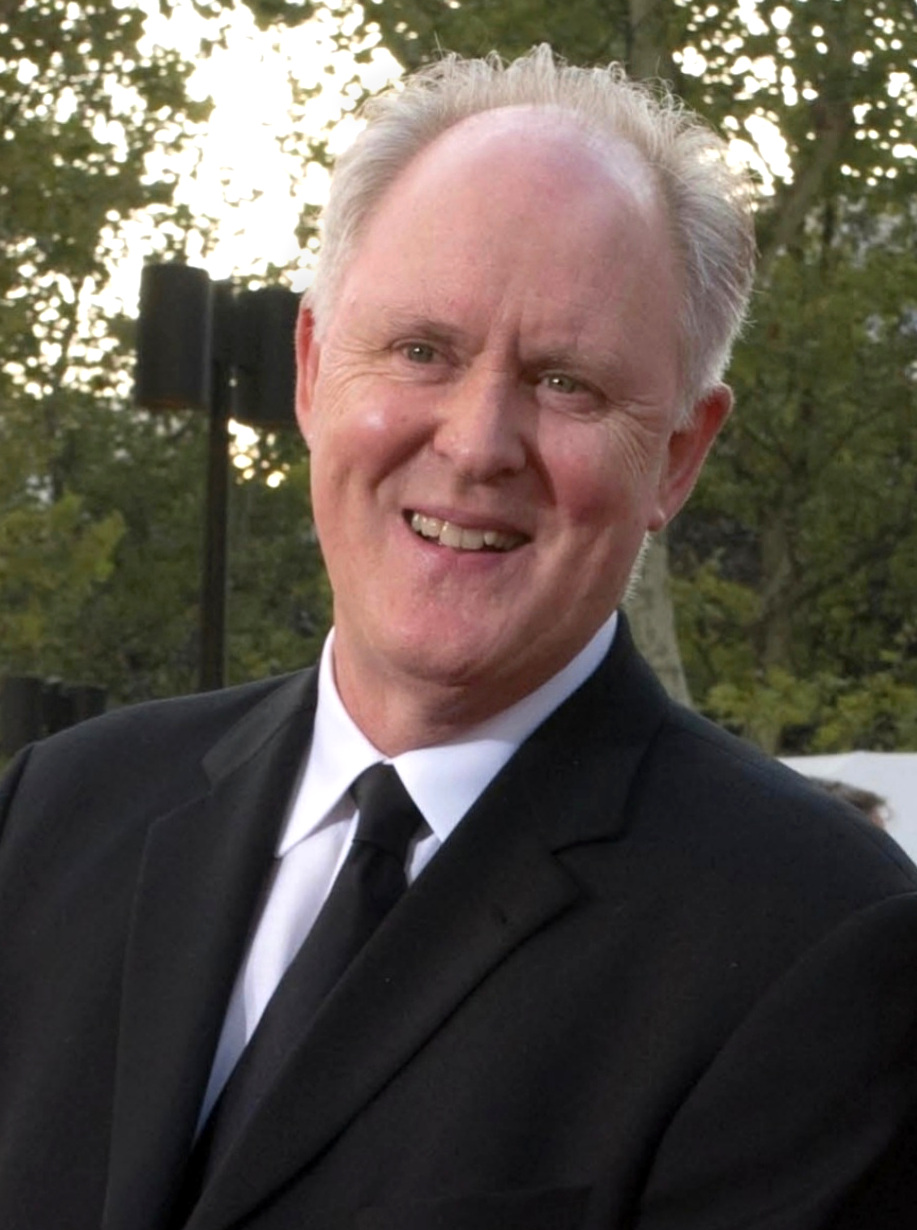
John Lithgow, Best Actor in a Supporting Role in a Series, Miniseries, Limited Series, or Motion Picture Made for Television winner

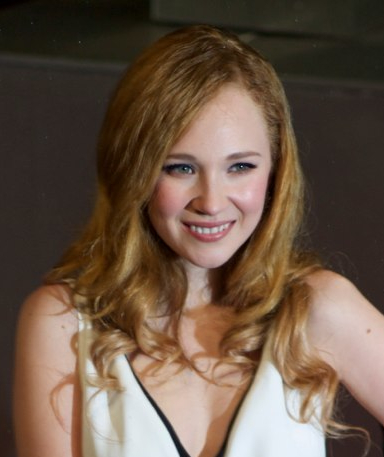
Juno Temple, Best Actress in a Supporting Role in a Series, Miniseries, Limited Series, or Motion Picture Made for Television winner

Winners are listed first and highlighted in bold.

Best Drama Series	Best Comedy or Musical Series
**Billions (Showtime)**; 1883 (Paramount+); The Bear (FX on Hulu); Better Call Saul (AMC); Gentleman Jack (HBO); Heartstopper (Netflix); Julia (HBO Max); Yellowjackets (Showtime)	**Barry (HBO)**; Atlanta (FX); Hacks (HBO Max); Minx (HBO Max); Only Murders in the Building (Hulu); Pivoting (Fox)
Best Genre Series	Best Miniseries & Limited Series
**The Boys (Prime Video)**; From (eᴘix); The Man Who Fell to Earth (Showtime); Outlander (Starz); Severance (Apple TV+); Stranger Things (Netflix)	**Under the Banner of Heaven (FX on Hulu)**; Dahmer – Monster: The Jeffrey Dahmer Story (Netflix); The Ipcress File (AMC+); The Old Man (FX); Pachinko (Apple TV+); The Staircase (HBO Max); This Is Going to Hurt (AMC+); We Own This City (HBO)
Best Motion Picture Made for Television
**Weird: The Al Yankovic Story (The Roku Channel)**; Fresh (Hulu); Operation Mincemeat (Netflix); Rescued by Ruby (Netflix); The Survivor (HBO)
Best Actor in a Drama or Genre Series	Best Actress in a Drama or Genre Series
**Bob Odenkirk – Better Call Saul as Jimmy McGill / Saul Goodman / Gene Takavic (AMC)**; Shaun Evans – Endeavour as Endeavour Morse (PBS); John C. Reilly – Winning Time: The Rise of the Lakers Dynasty as Jerry Buss (HBO); Adam Scott – Severance as Mark Scout (Apple TV+); J. K. Simmons – Night Sky as Franklin York (Prime Video); Jeremy Allen White – The Bear as Carmen "Carmy" Berzatto (FX on Hulu)	**Elisabeth Moss – The Handmaid's Tale as June Osborne (Hulu)**; Carrie Coon – The Gilded Age as Bertha Russell (HBO); Laura Linney – Ozark as Wendy Byrde (Netflix); Rhea Seehorn – Better Call Saul as Kim Wexler (AMC); Sissy Spacek – Night Sky as Irene York (Prime Video); Zendaya – Euphoria as Rue Bennett (HBO)
Best Actor in a Comedy or Musical Series	Best Actress in a Comedy or Musical Series
**Bill Hader – Barry as Barry Berkman / Barry Block (HBO)**; Donald Glover – Atlanta as Earnest "Earn" Marks (FX); Danny McBride – The Righteous Gemstones as Jesse Gemstone (HBO); Craig Robinson – Killing It as Craig Foster (Peacock); Martin Short – Only Murders in the Building as Oliver Putnam (Hulu); Alan Tudyk – Resident Alien as Harry Vanderspeigle (Syfy)	**Selena Gomez – Only Murders in the Building as Mabel Mora (Hulu)**; Quinta Brunson – Abbott Elementary as Janine Teagues (ABC); Kaley Cuoco – The Flight Attendant as Cassandra "Cassie" Bowden (HBO Max); Ophelia Lovibond – Minx as Joyce Prigger (HBO Max); Edi Patterson – The Righteous Gemstones as Judy Gemstone (HBO); Jean Smart – Hacks as Deborah Vance (HBO Max)
Best Actor in a Miniseries, Limited Series, or Motion Picture Made for Television	Best Actress in a Miniseries, Limited Series, or Motion Picture Made for Television
**Evan Peters – Dahmer – Monster: The Jeffrey Dahmer Story as Jeffrey Dahmer (Netflix)**; Jon Bernthal – We Own This City as Sergeant Wayne Jenkins (HBO); Jeff Bridges – The Old Man as Dan Chase / Henry Dixon / Johnny Kohler (FX); Andrew Garfield – Under the Banner of Heaven as Detective Jeb Pyre (FX on Hulu); Jared Leto – WeCrashed as Adam Neumann (Apple TV+); Sean Penn – Gaslit as John N. Mitchell (Starz)	**Lily James – Pam & Tommy as Pamela Anderson (Hulu)**; Jessica Biel – Candy as Candy Montgomery (Hulu); Toni Collette – The Staircase as Kathleen Peterson (HBO Max); Elle Fanning – The Girl from Plainville as Michelle Carter (Hulu); Julia Roberts – Gaslit as Martha Mitchell (Starz); Renée Zellweger – The Thing About Pam as Pam Hupp (NBC)
Best Actor in a Supporting Role in a Series, Miniseries, Limited Series, or Motion Picture Made for Television	Best Actress in a Supporting Role in a Series, Miniseries, Limited Series, or Motion Picture Made for Television
**John Lithgow – The Old Man as Harold Harper (FX)**; Giancarlo Esposito – Better Call Saul as Gus Fring (AMC); Walton Goggins – The Righteous Gemstones as Baby Billy Freeman (HBO); Richard Jenkins – Dahmer – Monster: The Jeffrey Dahmer Story as Lionel Dahmer (Netflix); Shea Whigham – Gaslit as G. Gordon Liddy (Starz); Sam Worthington – Under the Banner of Heaven as Ron Lafferty (FX on Hulu)	**Juno Temple – The Offer as Bettye McCartt (Paramount+)**; Sally Field – Winning Time: The Rise of the Lakers Dynasty as Jessie Buss (HBO); Cassidy Freeman – The Righteous Gemstones as Amber Gemstone (HBO); Melanie Lynskey – Candy as Betty Gore (Hulu); Cynthia Nixon – The Gilded Age as Ada Brook (HBO); Evan Rachel Wood – Weird: The Al Yankovic Story as Madonna (The Roku Channel)

=== Series with multiple nominations ===
Nominations	Series
4	Better Call Saul
4	The Righteous Gemstones
3	Dahmer – Monster: The Jeffrey Dahmer Story
3	Gaslit
3	The Old Man
3	Only Murders in the Building
3	Under the Banner of Heaven
2	Atlanta
2	Barry
2	The Bear
2	Candy
2	The Gilded Age
2	Hacks
2	Minx
2	Night Sky
2	Severance
2	The Staircase
2	We Own This City
2	Weird: The Al Yankovic Story
2	Winning Time: The Rise of the Lakers Dynasty

=== Series with multiple wins ===
Wins	Series
2	Barry
