= The Woman King =

2022 film by Gina Prince-Bythewood

- Theatrical release poster
- Directed by: Gina Prince-Bythewood
- Screenplay by: Dana Stevens
- Story by: Maria Bello; Dana Stevens
- Produced by: Cathy Schulman; Viola Davis; Julius Tennon; Maria Bello
- Starring: Viola Davis; Thuso Mbedu; Lashana Lynch; Sheila Atim; Hero Fiennes Tiffin; John Boyega
- Cinematography: Polly Morgan
- Edited by: Terilyn A. Shropshire
- Music by: Terence Blanchard
- Production companies: TriStar Pictures; Entertainment One; JuVee Productions; Welle Entertainment
- Distributed by: Sony Pictures Releasing
- Release dates: September 9, 2022 (TIFF); September 16, 2022 (United States)
- Running time: 135 minutes
- Country: United States
- Language: English
- Budget: $50 million
- Box office: $97.6 million

The Woman King is a 2022 fictionalised historical drama depicting the Agojie, the all-female regiment in the West African Kingdom of Dahomey. An American action-adventure film set in the 1820s, it stars Viola Davis as a general who trains the next generation of female warriors to fight their enemies. It is directed by Gina Prince-Bythewood and written by Dana Stevens, based on a story she wrote with Maria Bello. The film also stars Thuso Mbedu, Lashana Lynch, Sheila Atim, Hero Fiennes Tiffin, and John Boyega.

Bello conceived the idea for The Woman King in 2015 after visiting Benin, where the kingdom used to be located, and learning the history of the Agojie. She recruited Cathy Schulman to develop it into a feature film, pitching it to several studios, who turned it down due to financial concerns. After they met with TriStar Pictures in 2017, the film was greenlit in 2020. Production began in South Africa in November 2021, shut down due to the COVID-19 Omicron variant a few weeks later, and resumed in early 2022. Polly Morgan was the cinematographer. During post-production, the musical score was composed by Terence Blanchard, and the editing was completed by Terilyn A. Shropshire.

The Woman King had its world premiere at the Toronto International Film Festival on September 9, 2022, and Sony Pictures Releasing released the film in theaters in the United States on September 16, 2022. Following the festival screening, the film received generally positive reviews from critics, with praise directed towards Davis's performance and the action choreography. However, it received criticism for historical distortion of slavery. It was named one of the top ten films of 2022 by the American Film Institute and the National Board of Review. At the 28th Critics' Choice Awards the film received nominations for Best Costume Design, Best Acting Ensemble, Best Director, and Best Actress for Davis. Furthermore, Davis also earned Best Actress nominations at the Golden Globes, Screen Actors Guild, BAFTA Film Awards, and NAACP Image Awards.

It was the last film to be distributed by Entertainment One in Canada before the distributor's Canadian division was shut down on June 29, 2022, along with its Spanish distribution shortly before its release.

== Plot ==
In the West African kingdom of Dahomey in 1823, General Nanisca, leader of the all-female regiment of warriors, the Agojie, liberates Dahomean women who were abducted by slavers from the Oyo Empire. This provokes King Ghezo of Dahomey to prepare for an all-out war with the Oyo.

Nanisca begins to train a new generation of warriors to join the Agojie to protect the kingdom. Among these warriors is Nawi, a strong-willed girl who was offered by her father to the king when she refused to marry men who would beat her. Nawi befriends Izogie, a veteran Agojie. She also reveals to Nanisca that she is adopted and shows a scar on her left shoulder, shocking her.

Portuguese slave traders led by Santo Ferreira and accompanied by the half-Dahomean Malik arrive as part of an alliance with the Oyo, led by General Oba Ade. Nawi encounters Malik while the latter is bathing, and the two become friends.

Shortly after graduating from training to become a full-fledged Agojie, Nawi sneaks off to speak with Malik and learns that the Oyo are planning to attack. She reports this to Nanisca, who tells her off for her recklessness. Amidst a heated argument between the two, Nanisca reveals that in her youth, she was captured, raped, and impregnated by Oba. After giving birth to a daughter, Nanisca embedded a shark tooth in her left shoulder before giving her away. Nanisca helps Nawi extract the tooth, confirming that she is her biological daughter.

Nanisca leads the Agojie in an attack on the Oyo. The attack is successful, but Oba escapes and Nawi, Fumbe and Izogie are captured. With Nawi's advice, Fumbe escapes and reports the others' fate to Nanisca. Ghezo prepares to bestow the title of Woman King, his partner and equal in ruling Dahomey, upon Nanisca, but refuses to authorise a rescue mission for the captive Agojie.

Meanwhile, Izogie is killed in an escape attempt and Malik buys Nawi to protect her. Nanisca defies orders and sets out with a group of like-minded warriors to rescue the captives. The chaos allows Nawi to escape and rejoin Nanisca. Malik frees several other slaves who drown Ferreira, and Nanisca kills Oba in single combat.

The triumphant Agojie return to Dahomey, where Ghezo privately and briefly admonishes Nanisca for disobeying him, before crowning her the Woman King. After the festivities, Nanisca and Nawi privately acknowledge their familial relationship.

== Cast ==
- Viola Davis as General Nanisca
  - Wanda Banda as Young Nanisca
- Thuso Mbedu as Nawi
- Lashana Lynch as Izogie
- Sheila Atim as Amenza
  - Lethabo as Young Amenza
- Hero Fiennes Tiffin as Santo Ferreira
- John Boyega as King Ghezo respectively Gezo
- Jordan Bolger as Malik
- Jimmy Odukoya as General Oba Ade
  - Joel Mukadi as Young Oba
- Masali Baduza as Fumbe
- Jayme Lawson as Shante
- Adrienne Warren as Ode
- Shaina West as Esi
- Bonko Khoza as Boma
- Chioma Umeala as Tara
- Sne Mbatha as Okankan
- Siyamthanda Makakane as Cindra
- Siv Ngesi as the Migan
- Angélique Kidjo as the Meunon
- Zozibini Tunzi as Efe
- Makgotso M as Iniya
- Thando Dlomo as Kelu
- Julian Tennon] as Moru

== Production ==
=== Development ===
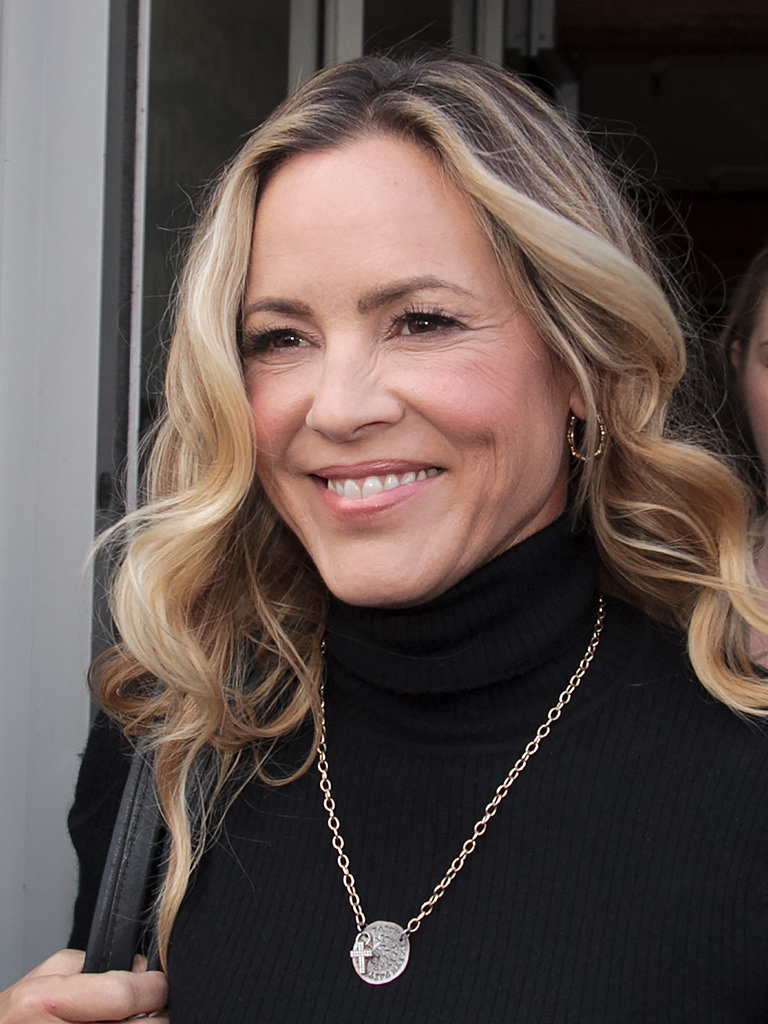
Producer Maria Bello in 2016

The Woman King was produced by Maria Bello and Cathy Schulman, written by Dana Stevens with contributions by Gina Prince-Bythewood, and directed by Prince-Bythewood. It is a co-production between TriStar Pictures and Entertainment One.

In 2015, Bello went to the West African nation of Benin to learn the history of the Agojie. Convinced she had found a story worth telling, she returned to Los Angeles and recruited Schulman, then head of organization Women in Film, to help her make the film. On September 19, 2015, Bello used a moment when she was presenting actress Viola Davis with an award at the Skirball Cultural Center in Los Angeles to pitch her idea for the movie in front of the crowd, who cheered at the notion of seeing Davis in the lead role.

Schulman first tried to set up the film at STXfilms, where she was the head of the production, but the studio was only willing to offer an unsatisfactory $5 million. After leaving STX in 2016, Schulman worked with Bello, Davis, and Julius Tennon, Davis's husband and producing partner at JuVee Productions, to take the idea elsewhere.

Studios who turned it down cited an unlikely chance for the film to turn a profit; others, according to Davis, wanted to cast light-skinned, well-known actresses, which they refused to do for historical accuracy and the audience's sake. Prince-Bythewood, also in 2016, was approached to write the screenplay but could not commit due to a scheduling conflict with Silver & Black. In 2017, without a script or director, the producers met with TriStar's then-chief Hannah Minghella and then-senior vice president Nicole Brown. Within two years, Brown had taken over Minghella's position and made The Woman King one of TriStar's top priorities.

In early 2018, the commercial success of the superhero movie Black Panther, which featured a fictionalized version of the Agojie, further motivated the crew to move forward with the project. In March 2018, Davis and Lupita Nyong'o were announced to star; Nyong'o's role was ultimately played by Thuso Mbedu. Lupita dropped out after learning about Dahomey's "legacy of violence." Prince-Bythewood read the screenplay once it was completed and came on board to direct, and in 2020, The Woman King was greenlit with a $50 million budget.

Prince-Bythewood referenced epic films like The Last of the Mohicans (1992), Braveheart (1995), and Gladiator (2000) as influences. Her background in sports gave her a perspective on the realism of fight scenes. In crafting the story, she sought for the women to be multi-faceted in both their fighting ability and their emotional reactions. She worked with production designer Akin McKenzie to learn about the Agojie. Their research included books, out-of-print texts, photographs, and writings by Princeton professor Leonard Wantchekon. "The biggest eye-opener," she said, "was how much misinformation there is about these women and this culture, given that so much of their history was written from the colonizer's point of view. So it was really about separating the texts that were from that point of view, which were so disparaging and disrespectful, from the truth."

For four months before the shoot, the cast performed 90 minutes a day of weight lifting with trainer Gabriela Mclain, followed by three-and-a-half hours of fight training with stunt coordinator Danny Hernandez, which included running, martial arts, and working with swords and spears. Davis was inspired by pro boxer Claressa Shields.

=== Filming ===
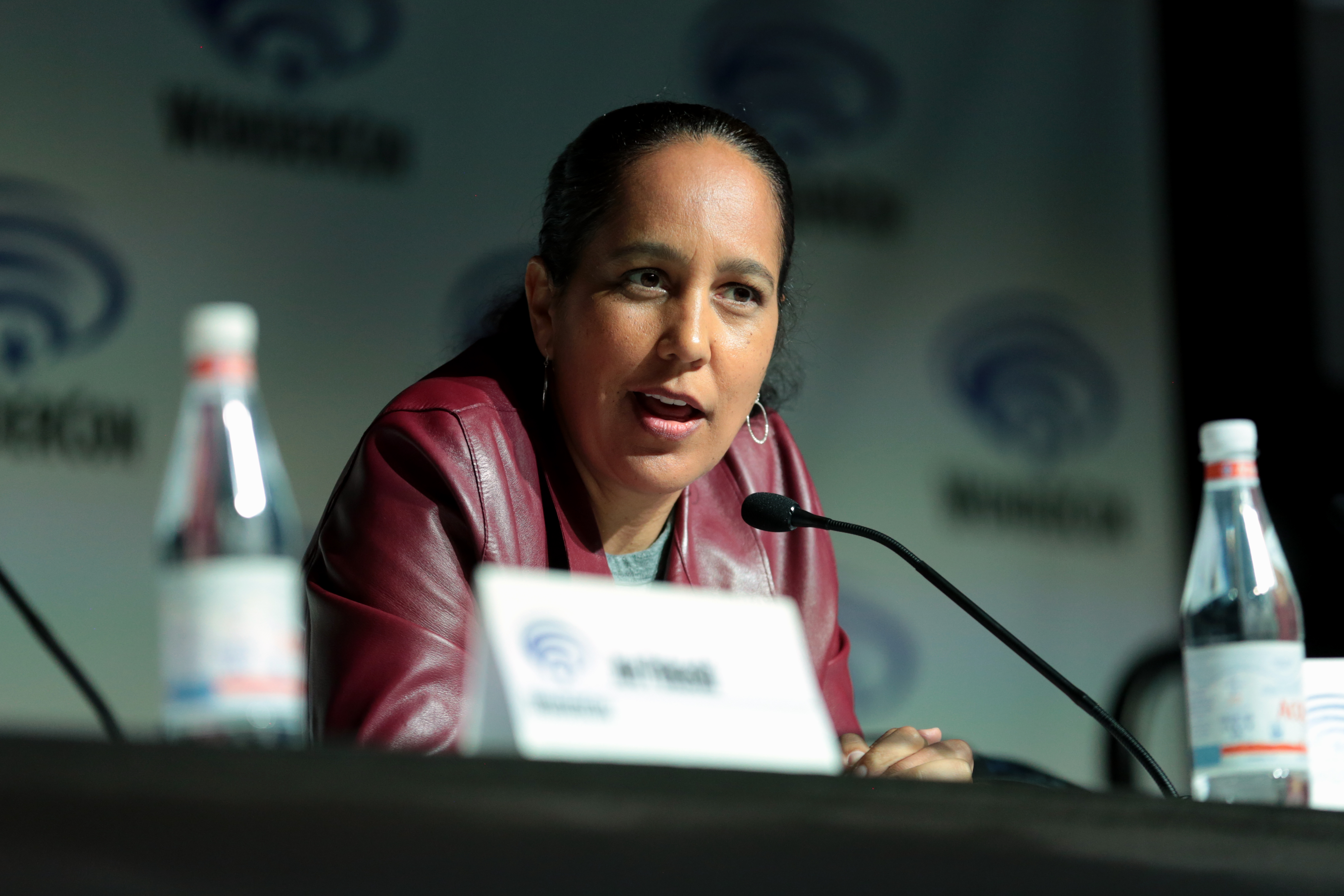
Director Gina Prince-Bythewood in 2018

In November 2021, the cast and crew flew to South Africa for a five-month shoot. Prince-Bythewood prioritized department heads who were women and people of color, including cinematographer Polly Morgan, production designer Akin McKenzie, costume designer Gersha Phillips, hairstylist Louisa Anthony, visual effects supervisor Sara Bennett, and editor Terilyn Shropshire. Makeup was handled by a local, South African artist, Babalwa Mtshiselwa. "The thing is for women and people of color," Prince-Bythewood said, "often the résumés are not long because it's about lack of opportunity, not lack of talent. So when you’re in my position, it's important to look past that résumé."

For a sequence in which a character is remembering a sexual assault, Prince-Bythewood referenced Christine Blasey Ford's testimony at Brett Kavanaugh's Supreme Court nomination hearing and asked the actress to read the Roxane Gay book Hunger, a memoir about Gay's rape. Filming for the first two weeks took place in the coastal province of KwaZulu-Natal for the shooting of jungle scenes. They then moved to the coastal city of Cape Town, where the majority of filming would take place. In their third week in South Africa, the COVID-19 omicron variant hit the production; Davis and Tennon were among the infected. Production shut down for a few weeks and resumed in mid-January 2022. This production halt forced them to re-rehearse a battle sequence with hundreds of performers. Prince-Bythewood called it the hardest shoot of her career.

=== Post-production ===
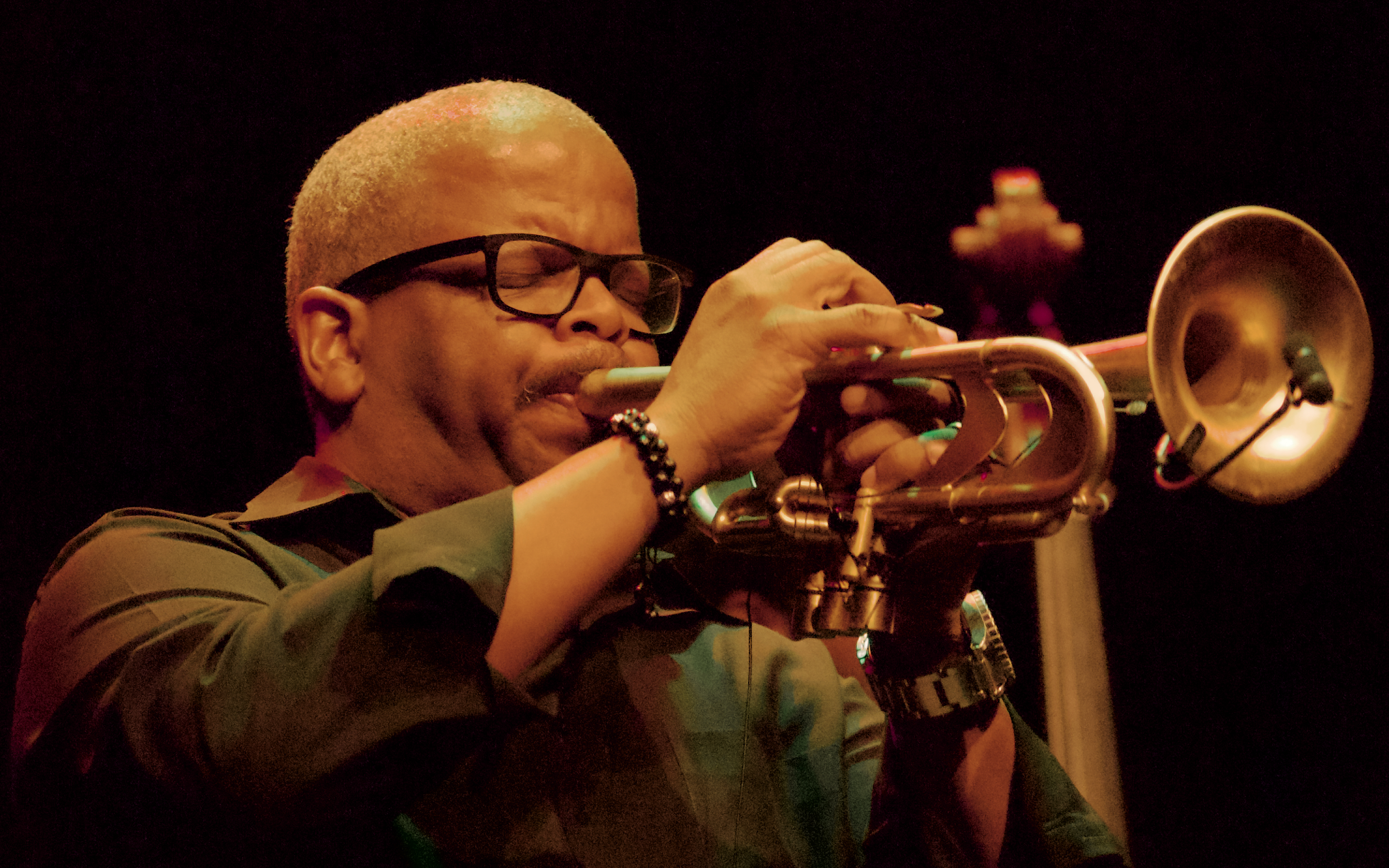
Film score composer Terence Blanchard in 2014

Editing was completed by Terilyn A. Shropshire, who worked on Prince-Bythewood's The Old Guard (2020). The film's musical score was composed by Terence Blanchard, who worked with Prince-Bythewood on her first film Love & Basketball (2000) and the television shows Shots Fired and Swagger. For the score, Blanchard enlisted the nine-voice Vox Noire ensemble, who worked with him on his opera Fire Shut Up in My Bones, with jazz singer Dianne Reeves as his soloist. They recorded for five days with the 78-member Royal Scottish National Orchestra in Glasgow, Scotland. Additional recordings occurred in New York with Vox Noire and Colorado with Reeves. Ghanaian-American mezzo-soprano Tesia Kwarteng led the choir. Three numbers by South African composer Lebo M of chants and dances were also performed in the film. The song in the end credits, "Keep Rising," was an original piece written by Jessy Wilson, Jeremy Lutito, and Angélique Kidjo and performed by Kidjo for Warner Chappell Music in late 2020, and later sold to Sony. The soundtrack album was released on September 16, 2022, by Milan Records.

== Release ==
The film premiered at the Toronto International Film Festival on September 9, 2022. It was released in theaters on September 16, 2022, by Sony Pictures Releasing. Sony handled distribution worldwide except in Canada and the United Kingdom, where distribution was held by Entertainment One.

The film was released for VOD on November 22, 2022, followed by a Blu-ray, DVD, and 4K UHD release by Sony Pictures Home Entertainment on December 13, 2022, in the United States. In the United Kingdom, it was released on DVD and Blu-ray, by Entertainment One and Universal Pictures Home Entertainment on February 13, 2023.

Netflix in the United States received The Woman King 153 days after its theatrical release on February 16, 2023 as part of a first window deal with Sony Pictures and a second window deal with Disney+.

It was the last film to be distributed by Entertainment One in Canada before the distributor's Canadian division was shut down on June 29, 2022, along with its Spanish distribution shortly before the film's release.

== Reception ==
=== Box office ===
The Woman King grossed $67.3 million in the United States and Canada, and $27.1 million in other territories, for a worldwide total of $94.4 million

In the United States and Canada, The Woman King was projected to gross around $12 million in its opening weekend, with some studios estimating it could reach as much as $16 million. The film made $6.8 million on its first day, including $1.7 million from Thursday night previews. It went on to over-perform and debut at $19.05 million from 3,765 theaters, topping the box office. Of the opening-weekend audience, 60% were female, 58% were over the age of 35, and 59% were African American. In its second weekend, the film made $11.1 million (a drop of 42%), finishing behind newcomer Don't Worry Darling. In its third weekend, the film made $6.8 million, finishing third.

=== Critical response ===
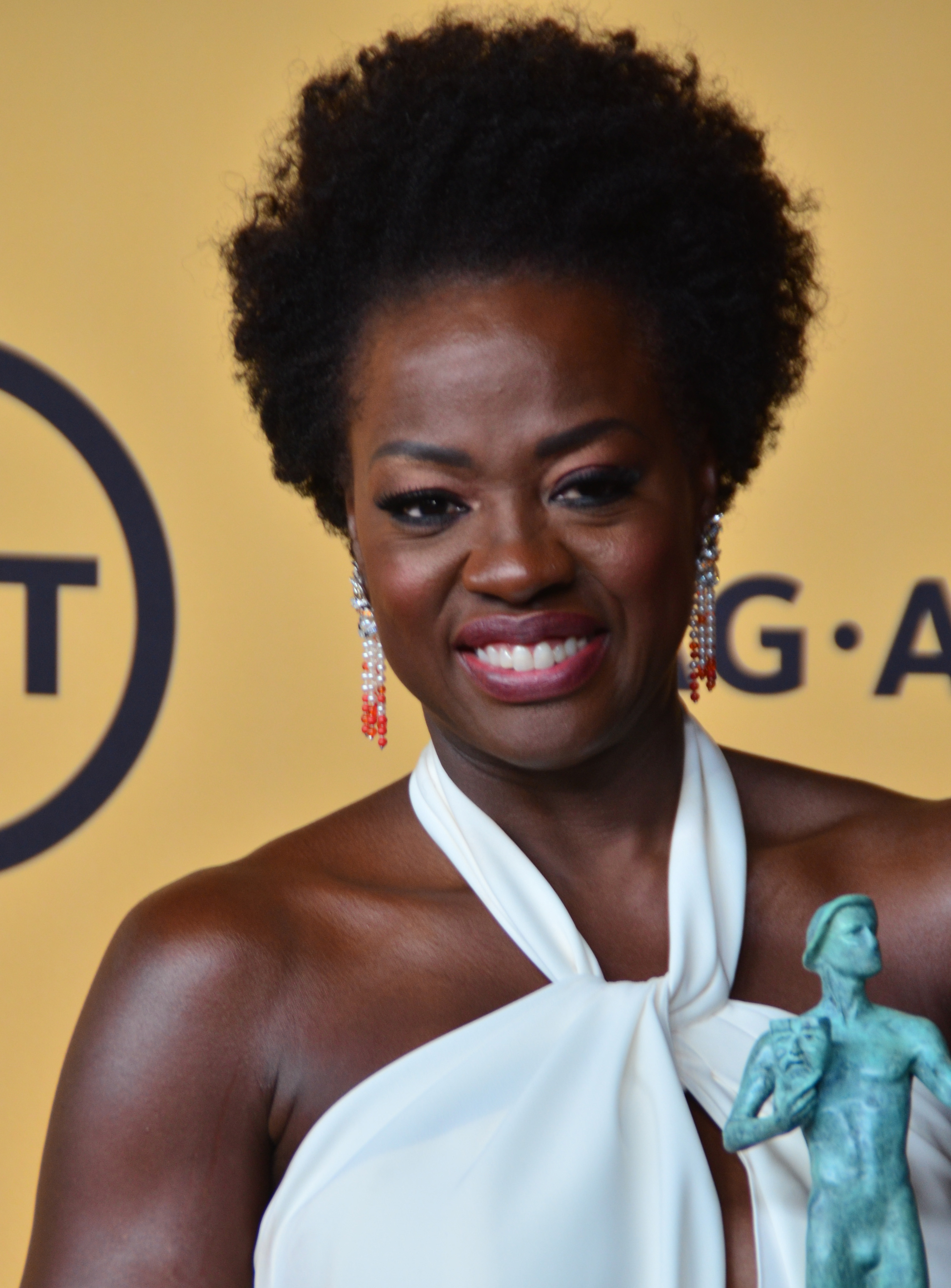
Critics praised Viola Davis for her performance.

The Woman King received positive reviews from critics for the cast's performance, including Viola Davis's starring role and Thuso Mbedu's breakout performance, and its action choreography, while some minor disappointment was expressed with the script. On the review aggregator website Rotten Tomatoes, 94% of 277 critics' reviews are positive, with an average rating of 7.8/10. The website's consensus reads: "All hail Viola Davis! The Woman King rules." On Metacritic the film has a weighted average score of 76 out of 100, based on 35 critics, indicating "generally favorable reviews". Audiences polled by CinemaScore gave the film a rare average grade of "A+" on an A+ to F scale, while those at PostTrak gave the film a 95% overall positive score.

Lovia Gyarkye of The Hollywood Reporter wrote, "A crowd-pleasing epic—think Braveheart with Black women." Robert Daniels at RogerEbert.com said, "When The Woman King works, it's majestic... The magnitude and the awe this movie inspires are what epics like Gladiator and Braveheart are all about." Kate Erbland of IndieWire said, "A hell of a time at the movies, a seemingly 'niche' topic with great appeal, the sort of battle-heavy feature that will likely engender plenty of hoots and hollers." /Film's Chris Evangelista said it was "an absolute blast. It's a film that isn't afraid to get you cheering." BBC critic Caryn James wrote, "It is a splashy popcorn movie with a social conscience."

Jamie Broadnax of Black Girl Nerds called Viola Davis's performance a career best. Gyarkye said, "The Oscar-winning actress, known for digging into her characters' psyches, accesses an impressive level of emotional depth and nuance as Nanisca." The Wrap's Martin Tsai wrote, "Davis truly gets to flex the full range of her acting chops. A performance of this caliber is rare in what's essentially an action flick." Chris Bumbray of JoBlo wrote, "Her raw intensity is backed up by a newly jacked physique that makes her an imposing action heroine, and she performs exceptionally well in the numerous action scenes." Other cast members who were praised included Lashana Lynch (Evangelista at /Film and Reuben Baron at Looper.com called her the film's standout) and Thuso Mbedu, who was called a "breakout star" by several critics; Tim Grierson at Screen International said that she "nearly steals the show" with an "exceptional supporting performance".

James said that the representation of history and culture "leans toward fantasy in its heroic moments, but is rooted in [the] truth about war, brutality, and freedom." Gyarkye said that it "begins as portraiture and then surrenders to melodrama when faced with the challenges of translating history for the screen and constructing a coherent geopolitical thread." Reuben Baron of Looper.com wrote, "The Woman King is an 8/10 for entertainment value, and 4/10 for how it deals with history." On the aspect of spectacle, critics said they wanted more action movies like The Woman King. Erbland said, "If this is what a Hollywood-ized and -sized blockbuster looks like in 2022, bring it on. Bring them all on." Evangelista concluded in his review, "Maybe one day we'll get to a point where such a movie doesn't feel groundbreaking, but here we are."

The Africa Report describes the response from Benin, where the movie is set, as mixed, with some Beninese reactions pointing out the historical errors and the liberties taken in the representation of the Benin culture by replacing elements such as song and dance with South African substitutes and others responding positively to the depiction of Benin historical events in a major Hollywood production.

=== Accolades ===
Accolades received by The Woman King
Award	Date of ceremony	Category	Recipient(s)	Result	Ref.
AARP Movies for Grownups Awards	January 28, 2023	Best Picture/Best Movie for Grownups	The Woman King	Nominated	
AARP Movies for Grownups Awards	January 28, 2023	Best Director	Gina Prince-Bythewood	Nominated	
AARP Movies for Grownups Awards	January 28, 2023	Best Actress	Viola Davis	Nominated	
AARP Movies for Grownups Awards	January 28, 2023	Best Ensemble	The cast of The Woman King	Nominated	
AARP Movies for Grownups Awards	January 28, 2023	Best Screenwriter	Dana Stevens	Nominated	
African-American Film Critics Association Awards	December 8, 2022	Top 10 Films of the Year	The Woman King	Won	
Alliance of Women Film Journalists	January 5, 2023	Best Picture	The Woman King	Nominated	
Alliance of Women Film Journalists	January 5, 2023	Best Director	Gina Prince-Bythewood	Nominated	
Alliance of Women Film Journalists	January 5, 2023	Best Woman Director	Gina Prince-Bythewood	Won	
Alliance of Women Film Journalists	January 5, 2023	Best Actress	Viola Davis	Nominated	
Alliance of Women Film Journalists	January 5, 2023	Most Daring Performance	Viola Davis	Nominated	
Alliance of Women Film Journalists	January 5, 2023	Woman Film Industry Achievement	Viola Davis	Won	
Alliance of Women Film Journalists	January 5, 2023	Best Woman Breakthrough Performance	Thuso Mbedu	Nominated	
Alliance of Women Film Journalists	January 5, 2023	Best Original Screenplay	Dana Stevens and Maria Bello	Nominated	
Alliance of Women Film Journalists	January 5, 2023	Best Woman Screenwriter	Dana Stevens and Maria Bello	Nominated	
Alliance of Women Film Journalists	January 5, 2023	Best Cinematography	Polly Morgan	Won	
Alliance of Women Film Journalists	January 5, 2023	Best Editing	Terilyn A. Shropshire	Nominated	
Alliance of Women Film Journalists	January 5, 2023	Best Ensemble Casting Director	Aisha Coley	Nominated	
American Cinema Editors Awards	March 5, 2023	Best Edited Feature Film – Dramatic	Terilyn A. Shropshire	Nominated	
American Film Institute Awards	December 9, 2022	Top 10 Films of the Year	The Woman King	Won (Note: This award does not have a single winner, but recognizes multiple films.)	
Austin Film Critics Association	January 10, 2023	Best Actress	Viola Davis	Nominated	
Austin Film Critics Association	January 10, 2023	Best Stunt Coordinator	Daniel Hernandez	Nominated	
BET Awards	June 25, 2023	Best Movie	The Woman King	Nominated	
BET Awards	June 25, 2023	Best Actress	Viola Davis	Nominated	
Black Reel Awards	February 6, 2023	Outstanding Motion Picture	The Woman King (Maria Bello, Viola Davis, Cathy Schulman and Julius Tennon, producers)	Won	
Black Reel Awards	February 6, 2023	Outstanding Director	Gina Prince-Bythewood	Won	
Black Reel Awards	February 6, 2023	Outstanding Actress	Viola Davis	Nominated	
Black Reel Awards	February 6, 2023	Outstanding Supporting Actress	Thuso Mbedu	Nominated	
Black Reel Awards	February 6, 2023	Outstanding Breakthrough Performance, Female	Thuso Mbedu	Won	
Black Reel Awards	February 6, 2023	Outstanding Breakthrough Performance, Female	Sheila Atim	Nominated	
Black Reel Awards	February 6, 2023	Outstanding Ensemble Casting Director	Aisha Coley	Won	
Black Reel Awards	February 6, 2023	Outstanding Cinematography	Polly Morgan	Nominated	
Black Reel Awards	February 6, 2023	Outstanding Editing	Terilyn A. Shropshire	Won	
Black Reel Awards	February 6, 2023	Outstanding Production Design	Akin Mckenzie	Nominated	
Black Reel Awards	February 6, 2023	Outstanding Costume Design	Gersha Phillips	Nominated	
Black Reel Awards	February 6, 2023	Outstanding Soundtrack	The Woman King (Original Motion Picture Soundtrack)	Nominated	
Black Reel Awards	February 6, 2023	Outstanding Score	Terence Blanchard	Won	
Black Reel Awards	February 6, 2023	Outstanding Original Song	Jessy Wilson, Angélique Kidjo and Jeremy Lutito for "Keep Rising"	Nominated	
British Academy Film Awards	February 19, 2023	Best Actress in a Leading Role	Viola Davis	Nominated	
British Academy Film Awards	February 19, 2023	Best Direction	Gina Prince-Bythewood	Nominated	
British Academy Film Awards	February 19, 2023	Rising Star	Sheila Atim	Nominated	
Critics' Choice Awards	January 15, 2023	Best Director	Gina Prince-Bythewood	Nominated	
Critics' Choice Awards	January 15, 2023	Best Actress	Viola Davis	Nominated	
Critics' Choice Awards	January 15, 2023	Best Acting Ensemble	The cast of The Woman King	Nominated	
Critics' Choice Awards	January 15, 2023	Best Costume Design	Gersha Phillips	Nominated	
Dallas–Fort Worth Film Critics Association	December 19, 2022	Best Picture	The Woman King	10th Place	
Dallas–Fort Worth Film Critics Association	December 19, 2022	Best Actress	Viola Davis	Nominated	
Dorian Awards	February 23, 2023	Film Performance of the Year	Viola Davis	Nominated	
Golden Globe Awards	January 10, 2023	Best Actress in a Motion Picture – Drama	Viola Davis	Nominated	`
Grammy Awards	February 5, 2023	Best Song Written for Visual Media	Angélique Kidjo, Jeremy Lutito and Jessy Wilson for "Keep Rising"	Nominated	
Hollywood Critics Association Creative Arts Awards	February 24, 2023	Best Casting Director	Aisha Coley	Nominated	
Hollywood Critics Association Creative Arts Awards	February 24, 2023	Best Costume Design	Gersha Phillips	Nominated	
Hollywood Critics Association Creative Arts Awards	February 24, 2023	Best Stunts	The Woman King	Nominated	
Hollywood Music in Media Awards	November 16, 2022	Best Original Score in a Feature Film	Terence Blanchard	Won	
Houston Film Critics Society	February 18, 2023	Best Actress	Viola Davis	Nominated	
Houston Film Critics Society	February 18, 2023	Best Stunt Coordination Team	The Woman King	Nominated	
ICG Publicists Awards	March 10, 2023	Maxwell Weinberg Publicists Showmanship Motion Picture Award	The Woman King	Nominated	
NAACP Image Awards	February 25, 2023	Outstanding Motion Picture	The Woman King	Nominated	
NAACP Image Awards	February 25, 2023	Outstanding Directing in a Motion Picture	Gina Prince-Bythewood	Won	
NAACP Image Awards	February 25, 2023	Outstanding Actress in a Motion Picture	Viola Davis	Won	
NAACP Image Awards	February 25, 2023	Outstanding Supporting Actor in a Motion Picture	John Boyega	Nominated	
NAACP Image Awards	February 25, 2023	Outstanding Supporting Actress in a Motion Picture	Lashana Lynch	Nominated	
NAACP Image Awards	February 25, 2023	Outstanding Ensemble Cast in a Motion Picture	The cast of The Woman King	Nominated	
NAACP Image Awards	February 25, 2023	Outstanding Writing in a Motion Picture	Dana Stevens and Maria Bello	Nominated	
NAACP Image Awards	February 25, 2023	Outstanding Costume Design	Gersha Phillips, Carly Nicodemo, Lieze Van Tonder, Lynn Paulsen and Tova Harrison	Nominated	
NAACP Image Awards	February 25, 2023	Outstanding Soundtrack/Compilation Album	The Woman King (Original Motion Picture Soundtrack)	Nominated	
National Board of Review Awards	December 8, 2022	Top Ten Films	The Woman King	Won	
Palm Springs International Film Festival	January 13, 2023	Chairman’s Award	Viola Davis	Won	
People's Choice Awards	December 6, 2022	Action Movie of 2022	The Woman King	Nominated	
People's Choice Awards	December 6, 2022	Female Movie Star of 2022	Viola Davis	Nominated	
People's Choice Awards	December 6, 2022	Action Movie Star of 2022	Viola Davis	Nominated	
Satellite Awards	March 3, 2023	Best Actress in a Motion Picture – Drama	Viola Davis	Nominated	
Satellite Awards	March 3, 2023	Best Costume Design	Gersha Phillips	Nominated	
Satellite Awards	March 3, 2023	Best Editing	Terilyn A. Shropshire	Nominated	
Satellite Awards	March 3, 2023	Best Original Score	Terence Blanchard	Nominated	
Satellite Awards	March 3, 2023	Best Sound	Becky Sullivan, Kevin O'Connell, Tony Lamberti and Derek Mansvelt	Nominated	
Screen Actors Guild Award	February 26, 2023	Outstanding Performance by a Female Actor in a Leading Role	Viola Davis	Nominated	
Screen Actors Guild Award	February 26, 2023	Outstanding Performance by a Stunt Ensemble in a Motion Picture	The stunt performers and coordinators of The Woman King	Nominated	
St. Louis Film Critics Association	December 11, 2022	Best Action Film	The Woman King	Nominated	
St. Louis Film Critics Association	December 11, 2022	Best Costume Design	Gersha Phillips	Nominated	
Washington D.C. Area Film Critics Association	December 12, 2022	Best Actress	Viola Davis	Nominated	

== Historical accuracy ==
The Woman King is set in 1823 in the Kingdom of Dahomey, now southern Benin. The kingdom existed from around 1600 through 1904, and the Agojie existed for most of that time; they formed at some point between the mid-1600s and the early 1700s and likely started waging military campaigns in the 1800s.

Initially, the Agojie were recruited from among the king of Dahomey's wives. During the rule of King Ghezo, Agojie warriors were recruited from a wider pool, including prisoners of war captured from neighboring states. Other Agojie served voluntarily, while still others were involuntarily enrolled by their fathers or husbands. Under Ghezo's rule, the Agojie grew from 600 warriors to roughly 6,000, comprising one third of the Dahomean military.

Dahomey had been paying tribute to the Oyo Empire, its adversary in the film, since 1748. In 1823, Ghezo successfully liberated Dahomey from being a tributary of the Oyo, as depicted in the film.

=== Characters ===
King Ghezo (played by John Boyega) was a historical figure who ruled Dahomey from 1818 to 1858 during the kingdom's political and economic "golden age." However, other characters in the movie, including the Agojie general Nanisca (played by Viola Davis), Nanisca's daughter Nawi (played by Thuso Mbedu), and the slave trader Santo Ferreira (played by Hero Fiennes Tiffin), are fictional.

Nanisca's name was likely inspired by an Agojie teenage recruit of the same name, whose fierce execution of a prisoner was recorded by a French naval officer in 1889. The character of Nawi was named after the last surviving Agojie warrior to have combat experience, who died in 1979. Kevin Lang of History vs. Hollywood speculated that Ferreira was loosely inspired by Francisco Félix de Sousa, a Brazilian slave trader who in reality was an ally of Ghezo and became an important figure in the Dahomey slave trade.

Agojie warriors were considered to be formally married to the king, which made them celibate. Lang argued that this made the film's romance subplot between Nawi and Malik (played by Jordan Bolger) implausible. However, some Agojie became pregnant (either through consensual sex or rape, as depicted in the film), and some married and had children after their service.

=== Role in slavery ===
According to Meilan Solly of Smithsonian, Dahomey was "a key player" in the Atlantic slave trade; it began the sale of West African captives to Europeans in the late 17th and the early 18th centuries. In 1727, Dahomey seized the port city of Ouidah, which became the second-largest supplier of captives in the slave trade. Between 1659 and 1863, nearly one million African slaves were sent to the Americas via Ouidah, which was under Dahomean control until 1892. In the film, however, Ouidah is depicted as being under control of the Oyo Empire.

In The Woman King, the Mahi people, allies of the Oyo Empire, raid Dahomean villages and sell the subjects into slavery. In reality, the larger Kingdom of Dahomey often led attacks on the Mahi.

During the film, Ghezo tells the story of his half-brother Adandozan, who was king of Dahomey from 1797 to 1818 after the assassination of his father, Agonglo. Adandozan punished members of the royal family who participated in the plot against Agonglo by selling them into slavery, including one of Agonglo's wives (and Ghezo's mother) Na Agontimé. In the film, Ghezo condemns Adandozan's actions, but when the real-life Ghezo seized power from Adandozan, he sold Adandozan's family members into slavery outside Dahomey.

The character of Nanisca confronts Ghezo about the immorality of selling slaves to the Portuguese and suggests trading in palm oil instead. However, Nanisca's anti-slavery stance is at odds with the actions of real-life Agojie generals such as Seh-Dong-Hong-Beh, who sought to acquire captives by raiding the Egba fortress of Abeokuta in 1851. Abeokuta was a rival of Dahomey and had begun to challenge its historical dominance of the slave trade. The historian John C. Yoder suggested that in the mid-1840s, some Agojie began to oppose conflict with Abeokuta and to support a more moderate stance on the slave trade. However, that interpretation was challenged by the historian David Ross.

While Ghezo briefly explored palm oil production as an alternate revenue source for the kingdom, he quickly resumed the slave trade after the palm oil industry proved less profitable. Ghezo ultimately agreed to end Dahomey's participation in the overseas slave trade in 1852 because of pressure from the British government. However, the kingdom continued to use slaves on its palm oil plantations after this date. Dahomey also continued to send slaves to Brazilian and Cuban slave traders until the 1860s.

== Controversy ==
The Los Angeles Times reported that online critics complained that "the movie seemingly uplifts the women without fully acknowledging that the Dahomey tribe sold other Africans into slavery" though others defended the film. The Conversation said "the film has drawn controversy from many angles." Before the film's release, online commentators commented on the perceived savagery of the kingdom, particularly by spotlighting rituals that involved human sacrifices. That narrative of criticism was broadened by the voices of American Descendants of Slavery (ADOS), which vehemently called for a boycott of the film by arguing it glorified a kingdom responsible for brutalizing its ancestors. Adding to the chorus of disapproval were specialists in 19th-century Dahomey history, who raised flags over inaccuracies in the film's representation of the slave trade. Moreover, a segment of the social media populace, advocating for the portrayal of more positive black stories, questioned the decision to focus on Dahomey. They suggested that other historical narratives, such as those exemplified by figures like Toussaint Louverture, would have been more appropriate and uplifting subjects for cinematic exploration.

On social media, the hashtag #BoycottWomanKing was trending for days. The Wrap noted, "Critics don’t have an issue with Davis playing a strong Black leader in “The Woman King,” but are alarmed that the history of the Dahomey tribe, who sold other Africans into slavery, has been whitewashed." Viola Davis responded to calls for a boycott of the movie by arguing that "Most of the story is fictionalized. It has to be," while Tennon stated that "We have to entertain people. [...] If people want to learn more, they can investigate more."
