= Muddy Magnolias =

American rock band

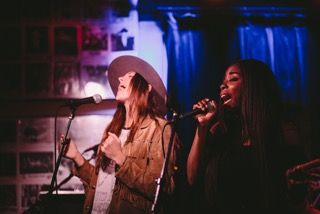

Background information
- Origin: Nashville, Tennessee, United States
- Genres: Blues, alternative rock, country, indie rock
- Years active: 2013–2017
- Labels: Third Generation; The Orchard
- Members: Kallie North; Jessy Wilson
- Website: muddymagnolias.com (defunct)

Muddy Magnolias was a rock band from Nashville, Tennessee, formed by Jessy Wilson and Kallie North in 2014. After their performance at the CMA Music Festival that August, Rolling Stone deemed them best unsigned duo, describing their performance to be "as if Mick Jagger and Keith Richards inhabited the Indigo Girls". In May 2015, they were featured in Elle Magazine's Women in Music Issue. They have played with artists including Gary Clark Jr., Grace Potter, Zac Brown Band and Kid Rock. 2016 saw their performance at a number of festivals including Hangout Fest, Lollapalooza, and Austin City Limits. In September, they were featured in the Wall Street Journal's Speakeasy blog for their song "Leave it to the Sky". Their debut album Broken People was released October 14. on Third Generation Records. Kallie North left the band at the end of 2017. A video by producer/YouTube personality Rick Beato showcasing their demo "Down By The Riverside" as "the best song that ever went nowhere" went viral in 2022, prompting a digital release of the song five years after the demise of the duo.

== Biography ==
Jessy Wilson and Kallie North met through a photograph in 2013. Wilson, a Brooklyn native, came to Nashville looking for new opportunities to branch out as a singer-songwriter after having previously visited the city with her mentor John Legend, with whom she collaborated and toured as a backing vocalist. North, originally from Beaumont, Texas, worked as a photographer before deciding to pursue a career in music. Her photo of a juke joint piano served as the impetus for the Muddy Magnolias's formation after Jessy saw it on a Music Row desk. They were signed to I.R.S. Records but the label closed before they could release an album. Their sound has subsequently been described as "melding city grit and delta dirt".

== Discography ==
=== Albums ===
- Broken People (2016)

=== EPs ===
- Muddy Magnolias (2015)

=== Singles ===
- "American Woman" (2015)
- "Brother, What Happened?" (2016)
- "Broken People" (2016)
- "Leave It to the Sky" (2016)
- "Why Don't You Stay?" (2016)
- "Devil's Teeth" (2017)
- "Shine On!" (2017)
- "Down by the Riverside" (2022)

=== Music videos ===
Year	Video	Director
2016	"Brother, What Happened?"	Reid Long
2017	"Devil's Teeth"	Reid Long
