= Bryan Litson =

Canadian visual effects artist

- Occupation: Visual effects artist

Bryan Litson is a Canadian visual effects artist. He was nominated for an Academy Award in the category Best Visual Effects for the film Top Gun: Maverick.

== Selected filmography ==
- Top Gun: Maverick (2022; co-nominated with Ryan Tudhope, Seth Hill and Scott R. Fisher)
