= Terilyn A. Shropshire =

American film editor

- Occupation: Film editor
- Years active: 1987–present

Terilyn A. Shropshire is an American motion picture and television editor. She is the daughter of Thomas B. Shropshire, a corporate executive.

Her big break as a motion picture editor came when she was hired to cut Eve's Bayou, the auspicious feature directing debut of actress Kasi Lemmons. The film went on to become the highest grossing independent film of 1997, and it received numerous awards including Best First Feature at the Independent Spirit Awards. After the success of the film, Spike Lee suggested her to director Gina Prince-Bythewood for her breakout film Love & Basketball. She has collaborated with both Lemmons and Prince-Bythewood on nearly all of their films.

Shropshire has received an Eddie Award from the American Cinema Editors and has been nominated for an Emmy Award. She has been elected as a member of the American Cinema Editors.

== Filmography ==
- Embrace of the Vampire (1995)
- Poison Ivy II (1996)
- Another 9½ Weeks (1997)
- Eve's Bayou (1997)
- The Joyriders (1999)
- Luminarias (1999)
- Love & Basketball (2000)
- The Caveman's Valentine (2001)
- Never Get Outta the Boat (2002)
- Biker Boyz (2003)
- Redemption: The Stan Tookie Williams Story (2004)
- Diary of a Mad Black Woman (2005)
- Waist Deep (2006)
- Talk to Me (2007)
- American Violet (2008)
- The Secret Life of Bees (2008)
- Jumping the Broom (2011)
- Sparkle (2012)
- Black Nativity (2013)
- Beyond the Lights (2014)
- Among Ravens (2014)
- Miss Bala (2019)
- When They See Us (2019)
- The Old Guard (2020)
- Between the World and Me (2020)
- Bruised (2021)
- Women of the Movement (2022)
- The Woman King (2022)
- Twisters (2024)
- Children of Blood and Bone (2027)
