= Seth Hill =

American visual effects artist

- Occupation: Visual effects artist

Seth Hill is an American visual effects artist. He was nominated for an Academy Award in the category Best Visual Effects for the film Top Gun: Maverick.

In addition to his Academy Award nomination, he was nominated for two Primetime Emmy Awards in the category Outstanding Special Visual Effects for his work on the television programs Stranger Things and The Residence.

== Selected filmography ==
- Top Gun: Maverick (2022; co-nominated with Ryan Tudhope, Bryan Litson and Scott R. Fisher)
