= Jessy Wilson =

American singer-songwriter

- Born: Brooklyn, New York, U.S.
- Genres: Rock; pop; R&B
- Years active: 2013–present
- Website: https://www.jessy-wilson.com/

Jessy Wilson is an American singer from Brooklyn and former member of the rock duo Muddy Magnolias.

== Early life and education ==
Wilson was born in Brooklyn and graduated from Fiorello H. LaGuardia High School.

== Career ==
=== Muddy Magnolias ===
After high school Wilson began to sing backup for Alicia Keys on her albums and tours. She then moved to Nashville, Tennessee in 2013 to get her music career started. This is where she met her other band member Kallie North, and was mentored by John Legend. Muddy Magnolias performance with large media coverage was at the CMA Music Festival 2014, when the Rolling Stone magazine compared Wilson's vocals to Aretha Franklin. The group was later signed by Third Generation Records and released their album Broken People in 2016. Kallie North later left the band in 2017 due to unspecified reasons, which led to the group disbanding.

=== Solo career ===
After the breakup of Muddy Magnolias, Wilson began making artwork very similar to art made by Pablo Picasso. On January 15, 2019 Wilson released her new single "Love & Sophistication," along with a lyric video with French captions. The song will be featured on her first studio album Phase which is set to be released on May 3, 2019 and was produced by Patrick Carney of The Black Keys. Wilson says "In a way, like Dylan or Picasso, I feel like I’m going through these different phases as an artist, that's what inspired the title, Phase. This album fills the gap between everything I’ve been and everything I’m becoming. It's the piece that's been missing." The album will be released through Thirty Tigers Records.

"Love & Sophistication" was released as the first single of her debut album Phase on February 15, 2019. Wilson describes the song as a 60's or 70's R&B track. Wilson said to V magazines that she did not just want to write the song about a love relationship, but about an evolving relationship with sophistication involved in it as well. The music video to the song debuted on V magazines website on February 15, 2019, and features Wilson in a dark room singing to the song with French Captions. The song was produced by Patrick Carney, who is the drummer of The Black Keys.

== Discography ==
=== Albums ===
- Phase (2019, Thirty Tigers)

=== Singles ===
- "Love & Sophistication" (2019)

== Track listing ==
=== Digital Download ===
1. "Love & Sophistication" – 3:17
