= Dallas–Fort Worth Film Critics Association Awards 2021 =

27th Dallas Fort Worth Film Critics

27th Dallas–Fort Worth Film Critics Association Awards
- Date: December 20, 2021
- Location: Dallas, Texas
- Country: United States
- Presented by: Dallas–Fort Worth Film Critics Association
- Website: dfwcritics.com

The 27th Dallas–Fort Worth Film Critics Association Awards, honoring the best in film for 2021, were announced on December 20, 2021. These awards "recognizing extraordinary accomplishment in film" are presented annually by the Dallas–Fort Worth Film Critics Association (DFWFCA), based in the Dallas–Fort Worth metroplex region of Texas. The association, founded in and presenting awards since 1990, includes 30 film critics for print, radio, television, and internet publications based in North Texas. It is also committed to ensuring that their membership represents a broad range of voices, ideas and perspectives from across cultural, gender and ideological spectra.

The Power of the Dog was the DFWFCA's most awarded film of 2021, taking five honors: Best Picture, Best Director (Jane Campion), Best Actor (Benedict Cumberbatch), Best Supporting Actor (Kodi Smit-McPhee), and Best Screenplay (Campion).

== Winners and nominees ==
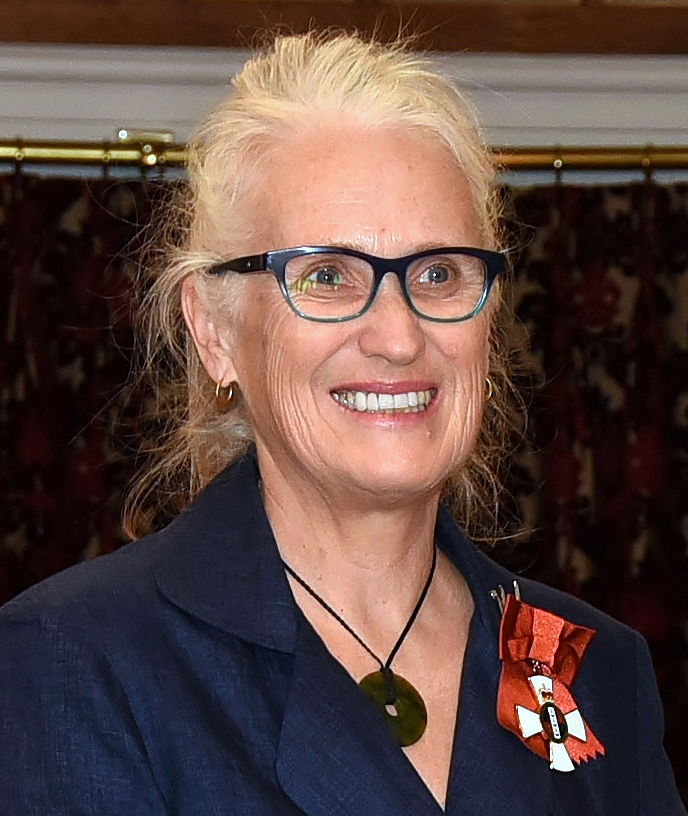
Jane Campion, Best Director and Best Screenplay winner

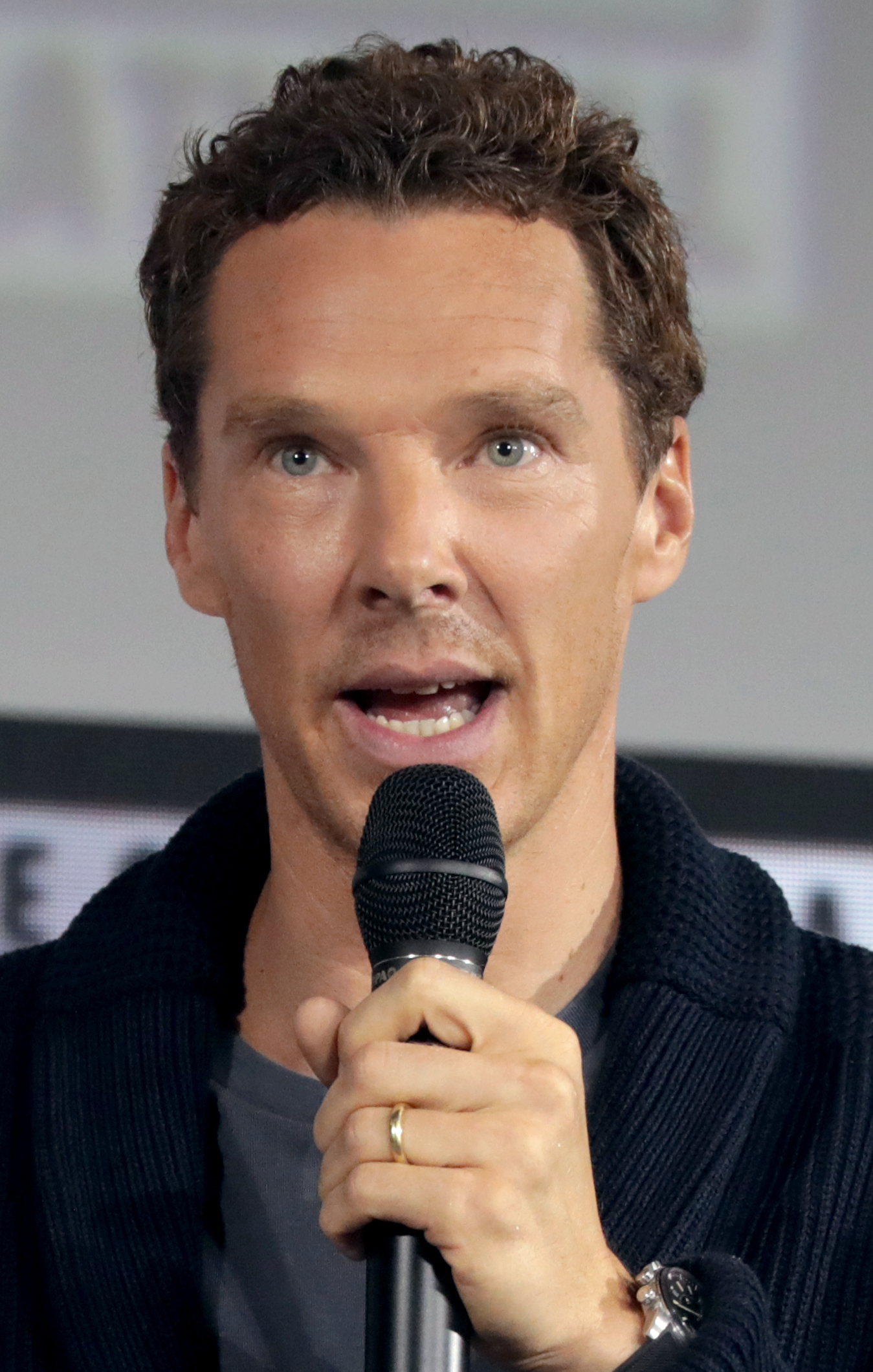
Benedict Cumberbatch, Best Actor winner

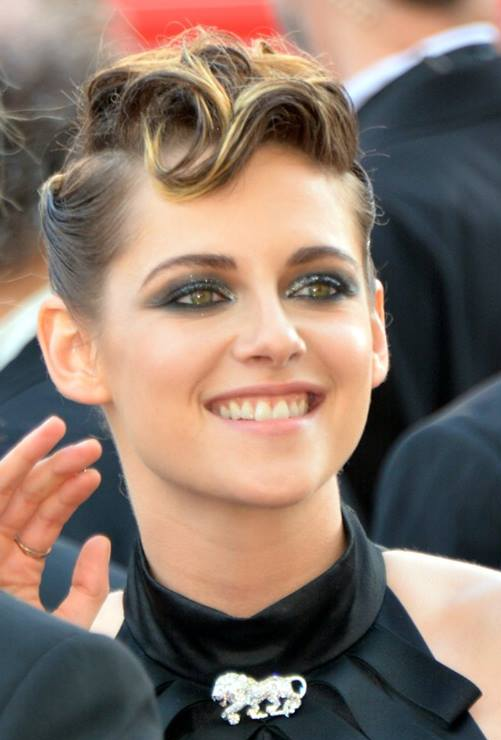
Kristen Stewart, Best Actress winner

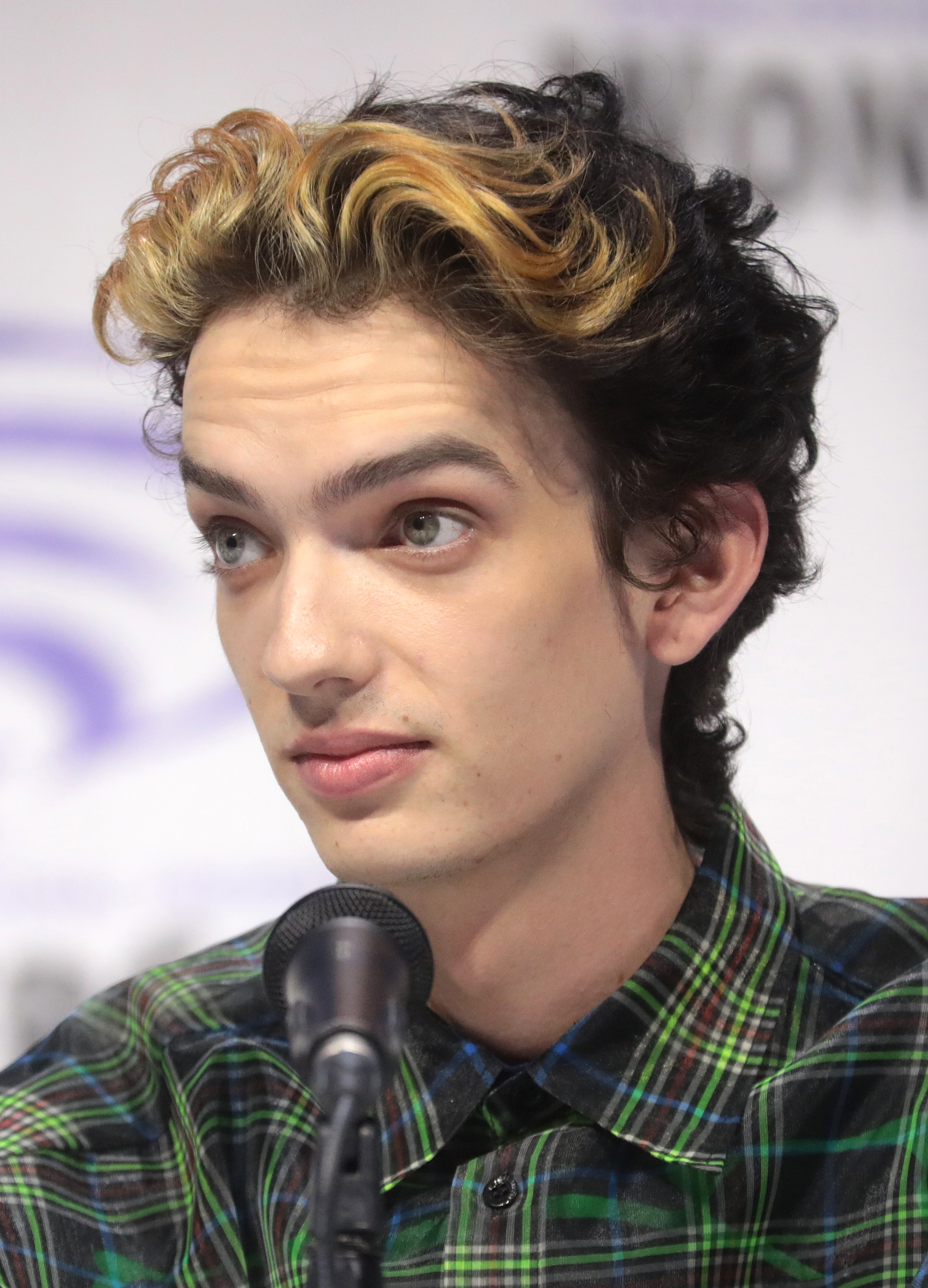
Kodi Smit-McPhee, Best Supporting Actor winner

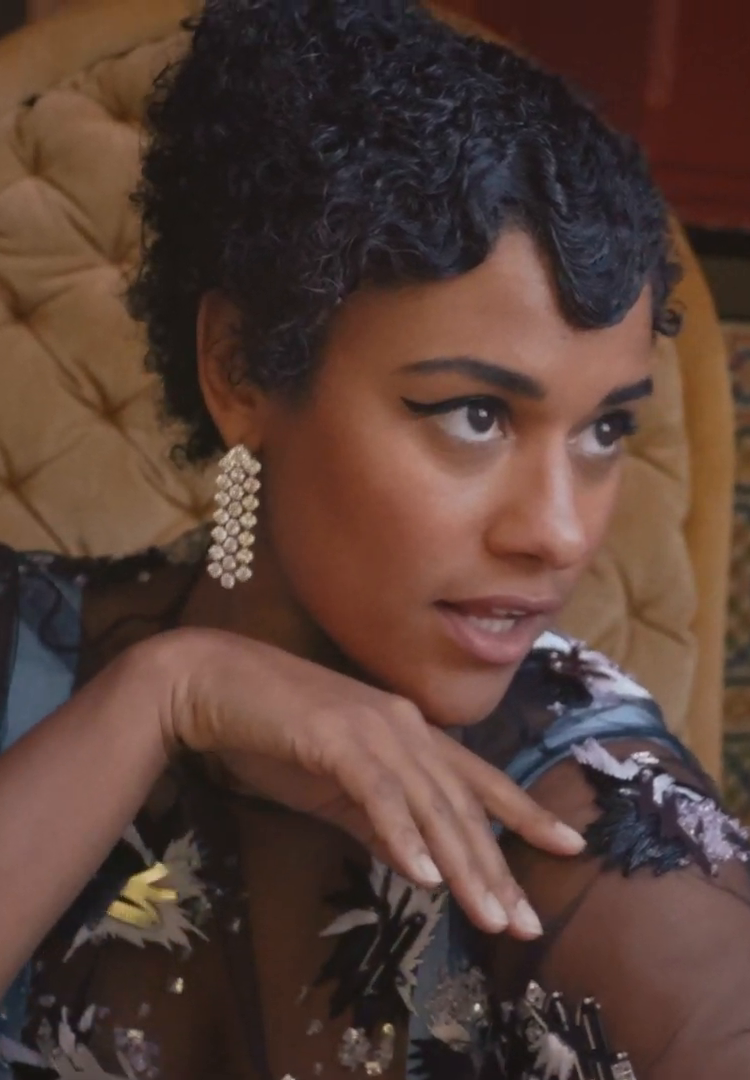
Ariana DeBose, Best Supporting Actress winner

=== Category awards ===
Winners are listed first and highlighted with boldface. Other films ranked by the annual poll are listed in order. While most categories saw 5 honorees named, categories ranged from as many as 10 (Best Film) to as few as 2 (Best Animated Film, Best Screenplay, Best Cinematography, and Best Musical Score).

Best Picture	Best Director
1. **The Power of the Dog**; 2. Belfast; 3. King Richard; 4. West Side Story; 5. Licorice Pizza; 6. Dune; 7. Nightmare Alley; 8. The French Dispatch; 9. The Lost Daughter; 10. CODA	1. **Jane Campion – The Power of the Dog**; 2. Steven Spielberg – West Side Story; 3. Kenneth Branagh – Belfast; 4. Denis Villeneuve – Dune; 5. Paul Thomas Anderson – Licorice Pizza
Best Actor	Best Actress
1. **Benedict Cumberbatch – The Power of the Dog as Phil Burbank**; 2. Will Smith – King Richard as Richard Williams; 3. Andrew Garfield – tick, tick... BOOM! as Jonathan Larson; 4. Peter Dinklage – Cyrano as Cyrano de Bergerac; 5. Denzel Washington – The Tragedy of Macbeth as Lord Macbeth	1. **Kristen Stewart – Spencer as Diana, Princess of Wales**; 2. Olivia Colman – The Lost Daughter as Leda Caruso; 3. Jessica Chastain – The Eyes of Tammy Faye as Tammy Faye Bakker; 4. Lady Gaga – House of Gucci as Patrizia Reggiani; 5. Nicole Kidman – Being the Ricardos as Lucille Ball
Best Supporting Actor	Best Supporting Actress
1. **Kodi Smit-McPhee – The Power of the Dog as Peter Gordon**; 2. Troy Kotsur – CODA as Frank Rossi; 3. Ciarán Hinds – Belfast as Pop; 4. Ben Affleck – The Tender Bar as Charlie Moehringer; 5. Jesse Plemons – The Power of the Dog as George Burbank	1. **Ariana DeBose – West Side Story as Anita**; 2. Kirsten Dunst – The Power of the Dog as Rose Gordon; 3. Aunjanue Ellis – King Richard as Brandy Williams; 4. Caitríona Balfe – Belfast as Ma; 5. Ruth Negga – Passing as Clare Bellew
Best Documentary Film	Best Foreign Language Film
1. **Summer of Soul (...Or, When the Revolution Could Not Be Televised)**; 2. Flee; 3. The Rescue; 4. Procession; 5. Val	1. **Drive My Car**; 2. A Hero; 3. The Worst Person in the World; 4. The Hand of God; 5. Flee
Best Animated Film	Best Screenplay
1. **Encanto**; 2. The Mitchells vs. the Machines	1. **Jane Campion – The Power of the Dog**; 2. Paul Thomas Anderson – Licorice Pizza; Kenneth Branagh – Belfast (TIE)
Best Cinematography	Best Musical Score
1. **Greig Fraser – Dune**; 2. Ari Wegner – The Power of the Dog	1. **Hans Zimmer – Dune**; 2. Jonny Greenwood – The Power of the Dog

=== Special award ===
==== Russell Smith Award ====
- **Flee**, for "best low-budget or cutting-edge independent film"
