= Dallas–Fort Worth Film Critics Association Awards 2020 =

Annual US film awards ceremony

26th Dallas–Fort Worth Film Critics Association Awards
- Date: February 10, 2021
- Location: Dallas, Texas
- Country: United States
- Presented by: Dallas–Fort Worth Film Critics Association
- Website: dfwcritics.com

The 26th Dallas–Fort Worth Film Critics Association Awards, honoring the best in film for 2020, were announced on February 10, 2021. These awards "recognizing extraordinary accomplishment in film" are presented annually by the Dallas–Fort Worth Film Critics Association (DFWFCA), based in the Dallas–Fort Worth metroplex region of Texas. The association, founded in and presenting awards since 1990, includes 30 film critics for print, radio, television, and internet publications based in North Texas. It is also committed to ensuring that their membership represents a broad range of voices, ideas and perspectives from across cultural, gender and ideological spectra.

Nomadland was the DFWFCA's most awarded film of 2020, taking three honors: Best Picture, Best Director (Chloé Zhao), and Best Cinematography.

== Winners and nominees ==
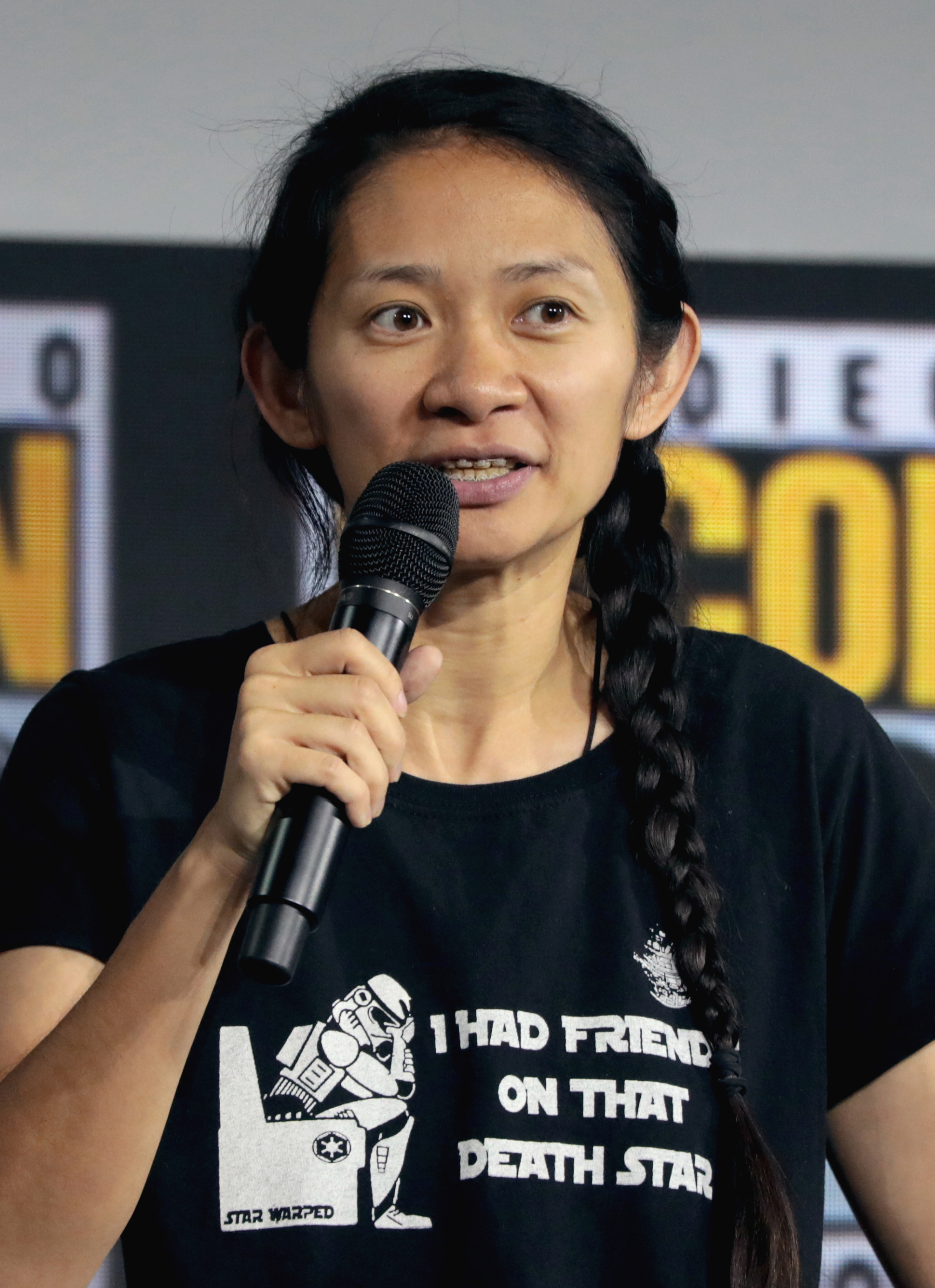
Chloé Zhao, Best Director winner

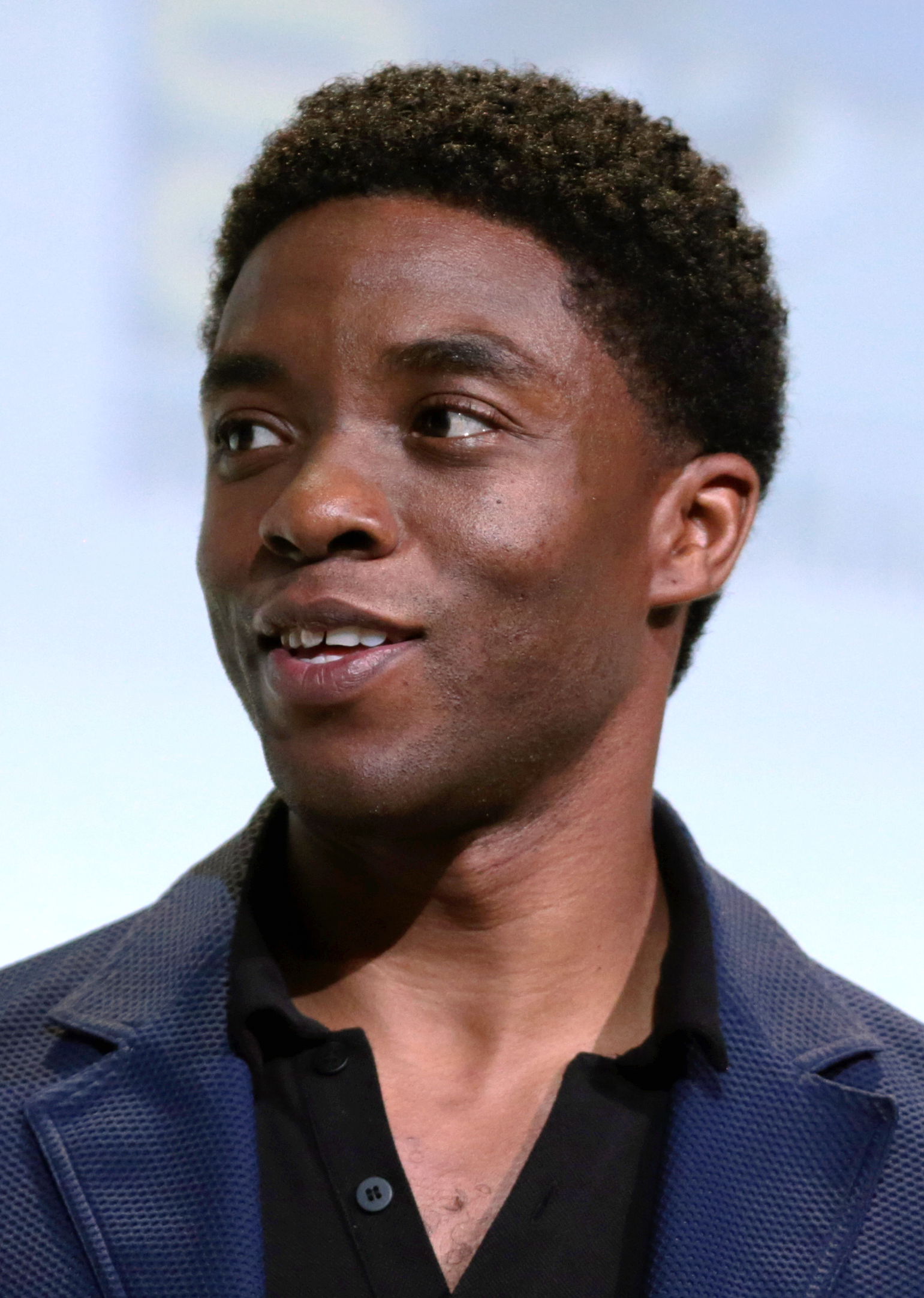
Chadwick Boseman, Best Actor winner

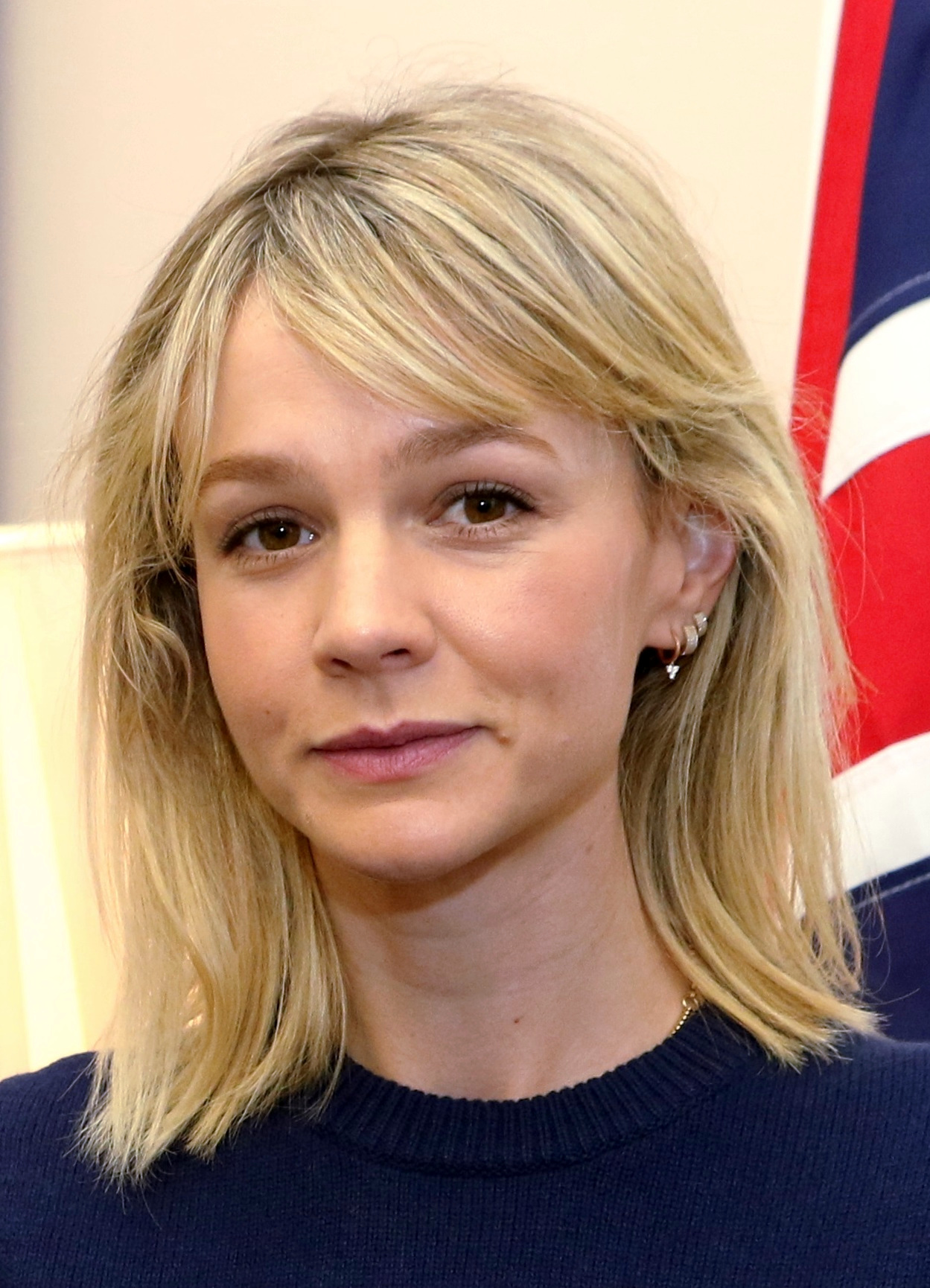
Carey Mulligan, Best Actress winner

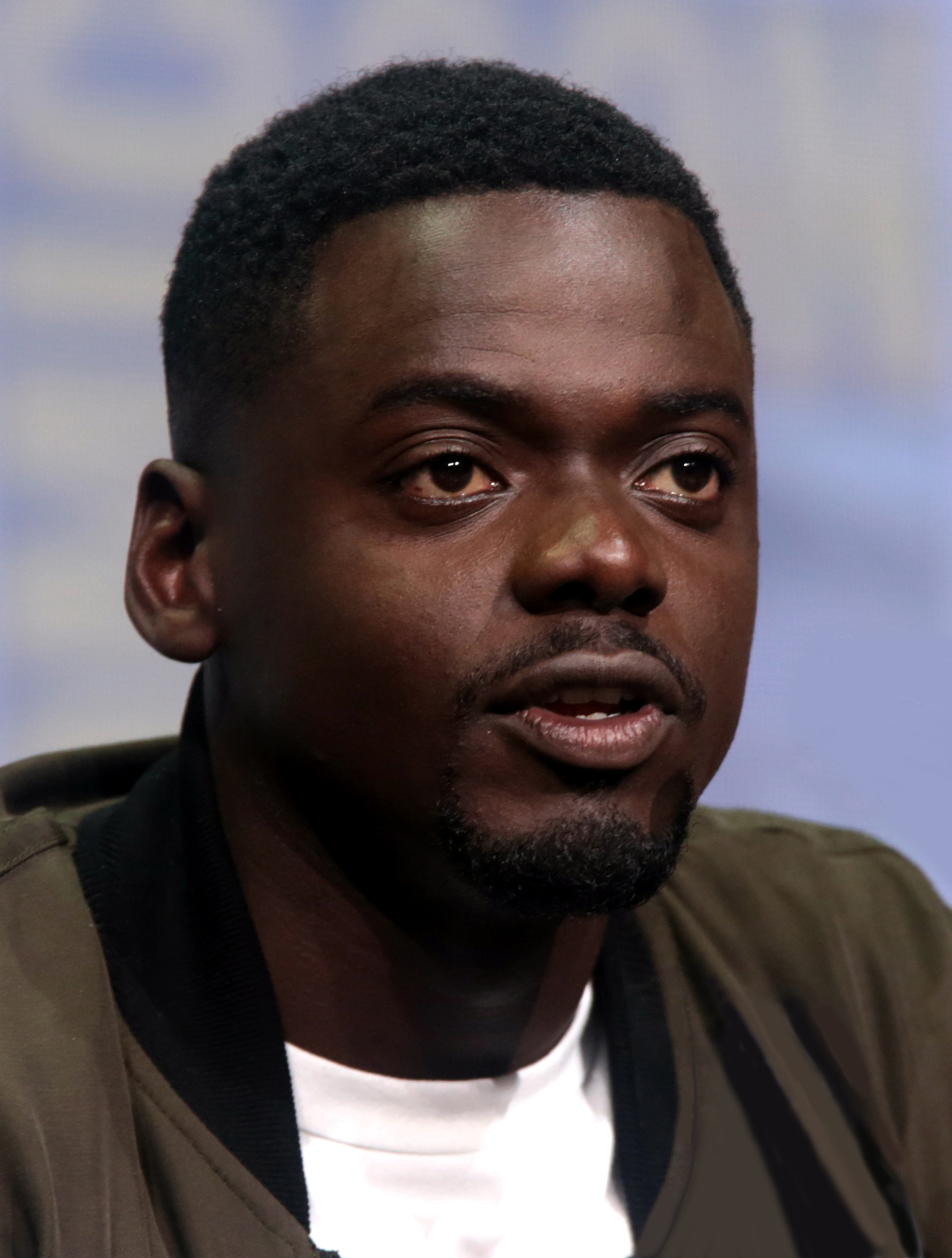
Daniel Kaluuya, Best Supporting Actor winner

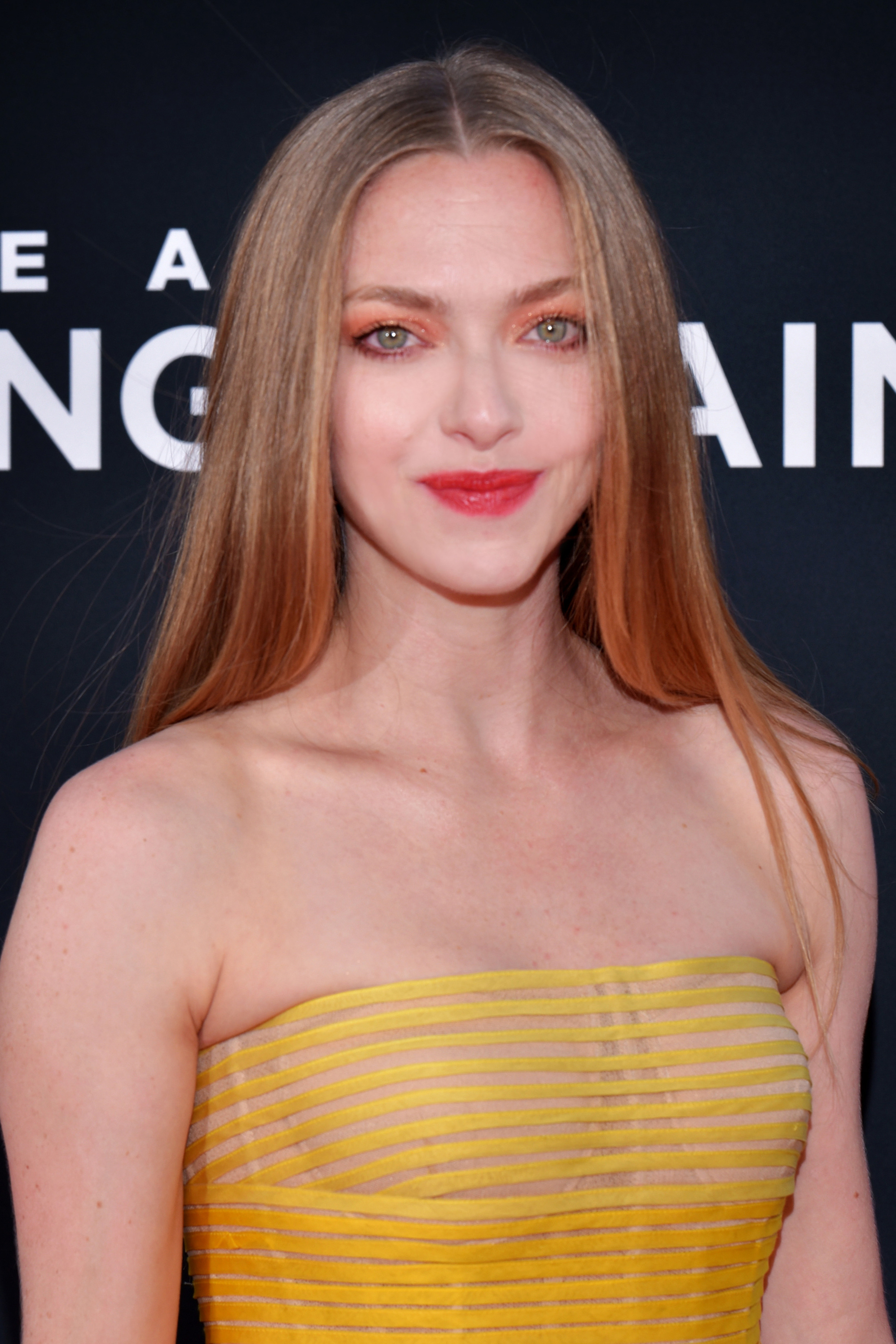
Amanda Seyfried, Best Supporting Actress winner

=== Category awards ===
Winners are listed first and highlighted with boldface. Other films ranked by the annual poll are listed in order. While most categories saw 5 honorees named, categories ranged from as many as 10 (Best Picture) to as few as 2 (Best Animated Film, Best Screenplay, Best Cinematography, and Best Musical Score).

Best Picture	Best Director
1. **Nomadland**; 2. Promising Young Woman; 3. The Trial of the Chicago 7; 4. Minari; 5. One Night in Miami...; 6. Mank; 7. Ma Rainey's Black Bottom; 8. Sound of Metal; 9. Da 5 Bloods; 10. First Cow	1. **Chloé Zhao – Nomadland**; 2. Emerald Fennell – Promising Young Woman; 3. Regina King – One Night in Miami...; 4. David Fincher – Mank; 5. Aaron Sorkin – The Trial of the Chicago 7
Best Actor	Best Actress
1. **Chadwick Boseman – Ma Rainey's Black Bottom as Levee Green**; 2. Riz Ahmed – Sound of Metal as Ruben Stone; 3. Gary Oldman – Mank as Herman J. Mankiewicz; 4. Delroy Lindo – Da 5 Bloods as Paul; 5. Anthony Hopkins – The Father as Anthony	1. **Carey Mulligan – Promising Young Woman as Cassandra "Cassie" Thomas**; 2. Frances McDormand – Nomadland as Fern; 3. Viola Davis – Ma Rainey's Black Bottom as Ma Rainey; 4. Vanessa Kirby – Pieces of a Woman as Marta Weiss; 5. Andra Day – The United States vs. Billie Holiday as Billie Holiday
Best Supporting Actor	Best Supporting Actress
1. **Daniel Kaluuya – Judas and the Black Messiah as Fred Hampton**; 2. Leslie Odom Jr. – One Night in Miami... as Sam Cooke; 3. Sacha Baron Cohen – The Trial of the Chicago 7 as Abbie Hoffman; 4. Bill Murray – On the Rocks as Felix Keane; 5. Paul Raci – Sound of Metal as Joe	1. **Amanda Seyfried – Mank as Marion Davies**; 2. Youn Yuh-jung – Minari as Soon-ja; 3. Helena Zengel – News of the World as Johanna Leonberger / Cicada; 4. Maria Bakalova – Borat Subsequent Moviefilm as Tutar Sagdiyev; 5. Olivia Colman – The Father as Anne
Best Documentary Film	Best Foreign Language Film
1. **Time**; 2. Dick Johnson Is Dead; 3. Boys State; 4. The Dissident; 5. Crip Camp	1. **Minari**; 2. Another Round; 3. The Life Ahead; 4. La Llorona; 5. Martin Eden
Best Animated Film	Best Screenplay
1. **Soul**; 2. Wolfwalkers	1. **Emerald Fennell – Promising Young Woman**; 2. Aaron Sorkin – The Trial of the Chicago 7
Best Cinematography	Best Musical Score
1. **Joshua James Richards – Nomadland**; 2. Erik Messerschmidt – Mank	1. **Trent Reznor and Atticus Ross – Mank**; 2. James Newton Howard – News of the World

=== Special award ===
==== Russell Smith Award ====
- **Minari**, for "best low-budget or cutting-edge independent film"
