= Dallas–Fort Worth Film Critics Association Awards 2019 =

US award ceremony honoring the best in film

25th Dallas–Fort Worth Film Critics Association Awards
- Date: December 16, 2019
- Location: Dallas, Texas
- Country: United States
- Presented by: Dallas–Fort Worth Film Critics Association
- Website: dfwcritics.com

The 25th Dallas–Fort Worth Film Critics Association Awards honoring the best in film for 2019 were announced on December 16, 2019.

These awards "recognizing extraordinary accomplishment in film" are presented annually by the Dallas–Fort Worth Film Critics Association (DFWFCA), based in the Dallas–Fort Worth metroplex region of Texas. The association, founded in and presenting awards since 1990, includes 30 film critics for print, radio, television, and internet publications based in North Texas. It is also committed to ensuring that their membership represents a broad range of voices, ideas and perspectives from across cultural, gender and ideological spectra.

1917 and Marriage Story were the DFWFCA's most awarded film of 2019, taking four top honors each.

== Winners and nominees ==
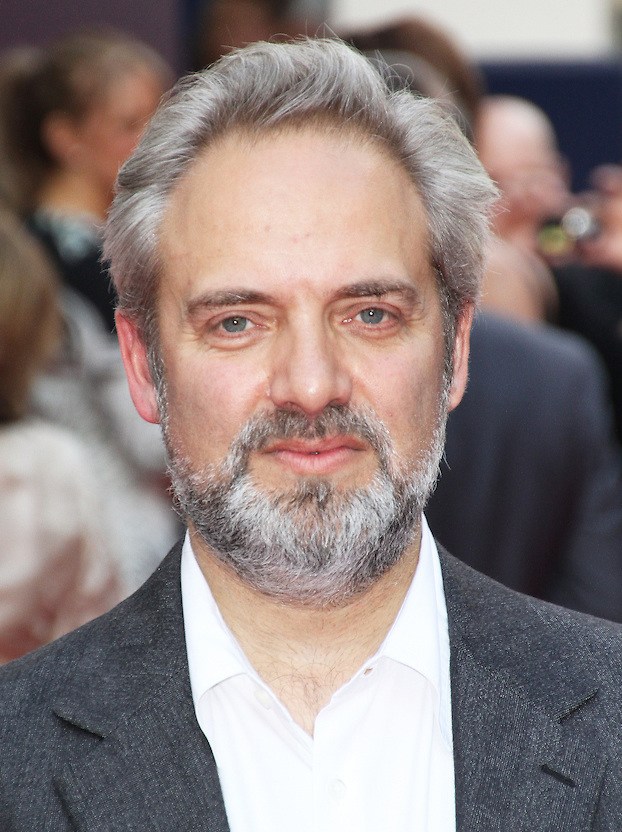
Sam Mendes, Best Director winner

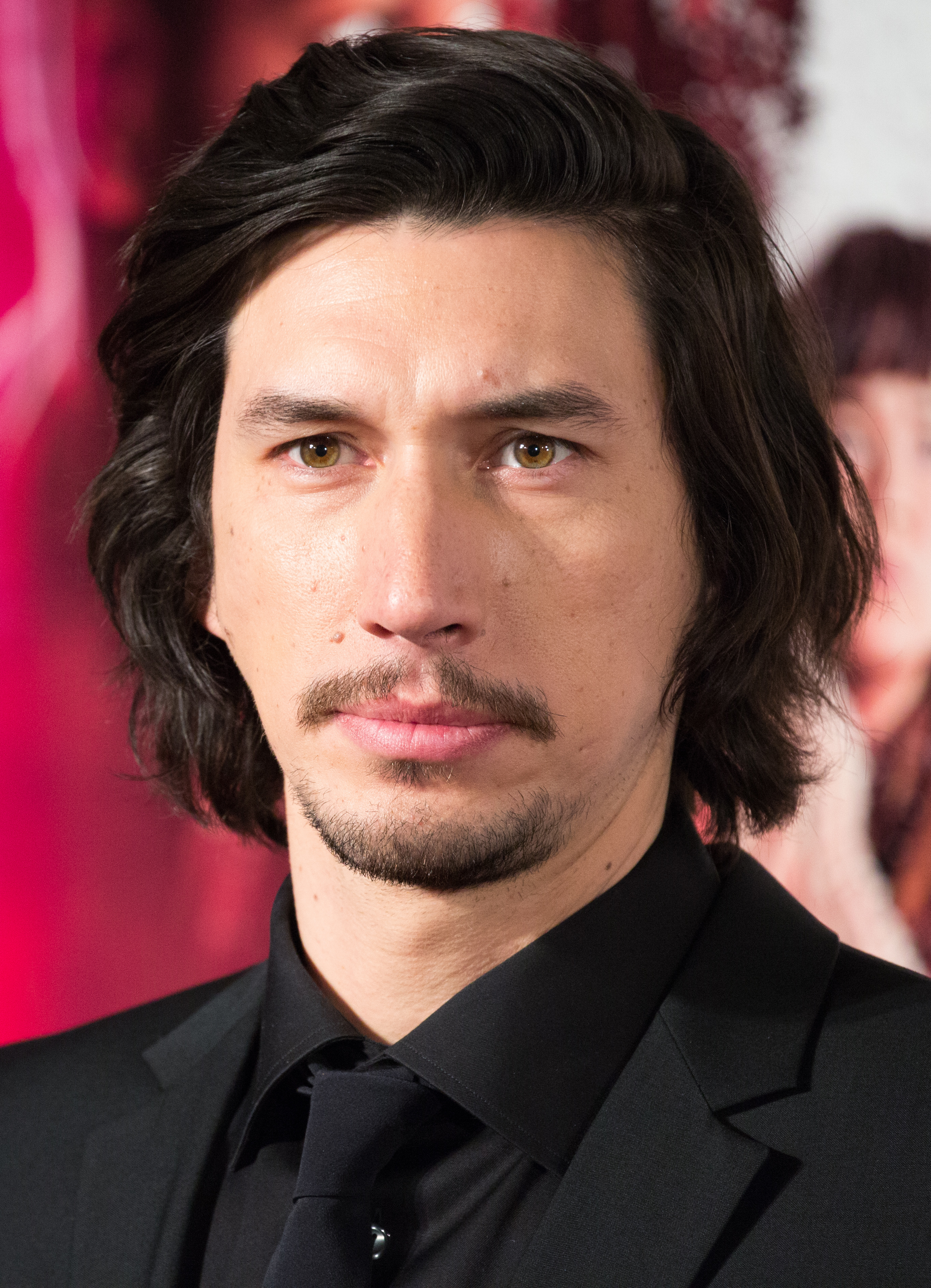
Adam Driver, Best Actor winner

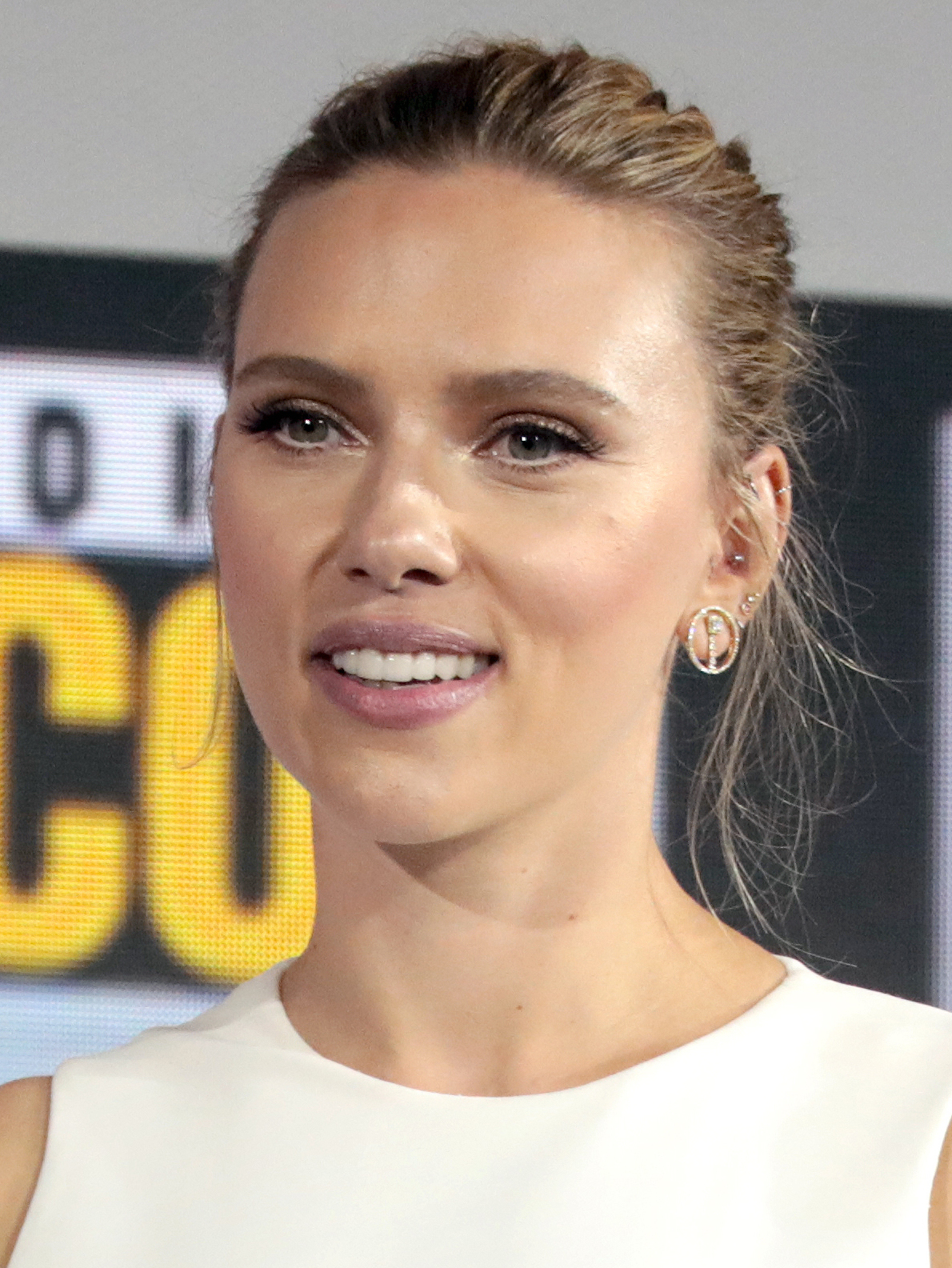
Scarlett Johansson, Best Actress winner

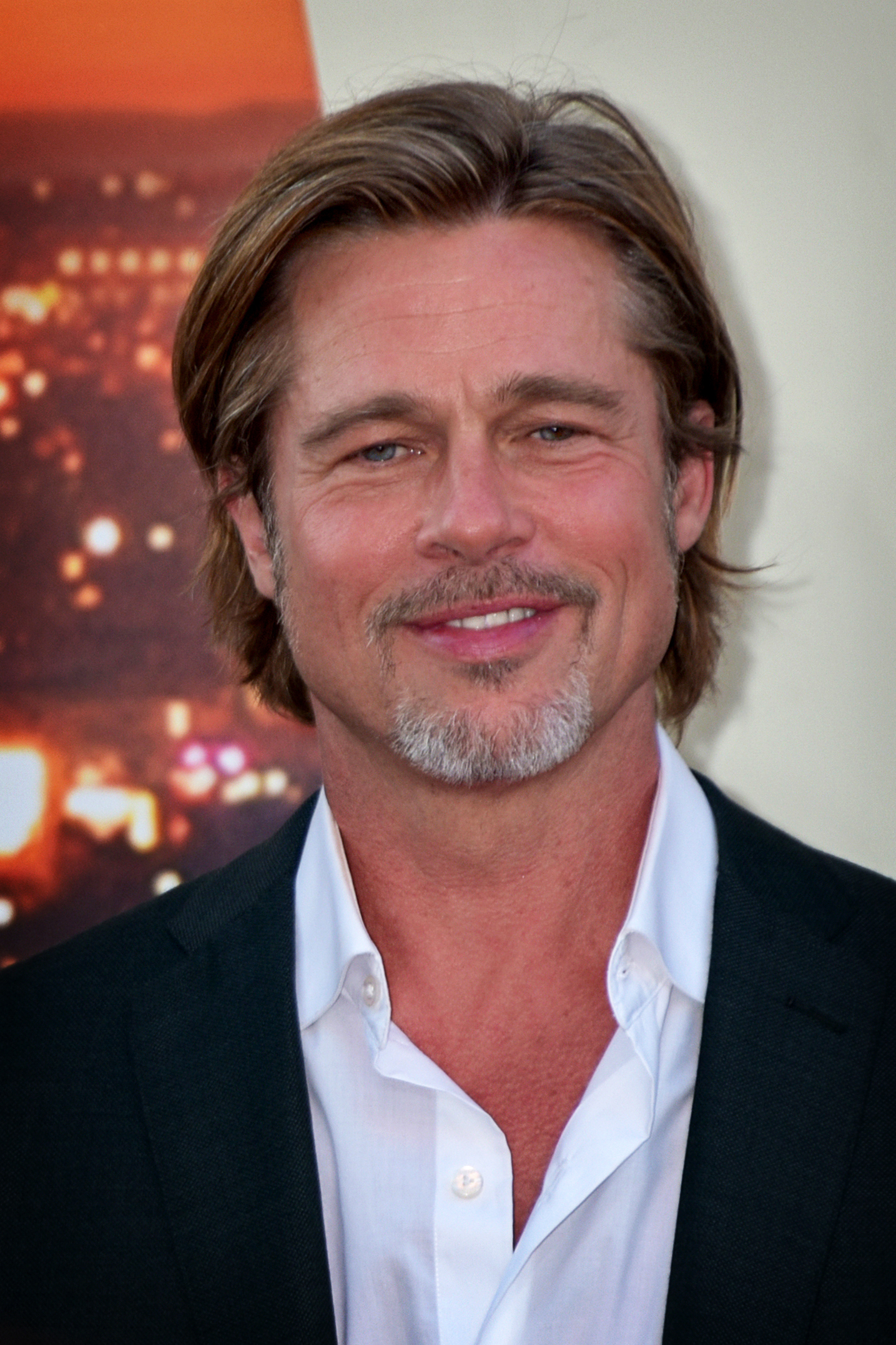
Brad Pitt, Best Supporting Actor winner

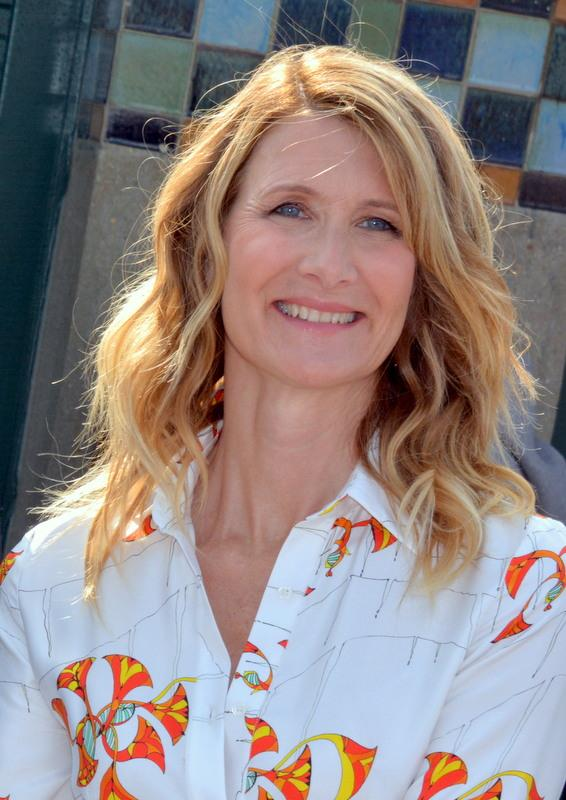
Laura Dern, Best Supporting Actress winner

=== Category awards ===
Winners are listed first and highlighted with boldface. Other films ranked by the annual poll are listed in order. While most categories saw 5 honorees named, categories ranged from as many as 10 (Best Picture) to as few as 2 (Best Animated Film, Best Screenplay, Best Cinematography, and Best Musical Score).

Best Picture	Best Director
1. **1917**; 2. Marriage Story; 3. Parasite; 4. The Irishman; 5. Once Upon a Time in Hollywood; 6. Jojo Rabbit; 7. Little Women; 8. The Farewell; 9. The Two Popes; 10. Knives Out	1. **Sam Mendes – 1917**; 2. Bong Joon-ho – Parasite; 3. Martin Scorsese – The Irishman; 4. Quentin Tarantino – Once Upon a Time in Hollywood; 5. Noah Baumbach – Marriage Story
Best Actor	Best Actress
1. **Adam Driver – Marriage Story as Charlie Barber**; 2. Joaquin Phoenix – Joker as Arthur Fleck / Joker; 3. Antonio Banderas – Pain and Glory as Salvador Mallo; 4. Leonardo DiCaprio – Once Upon a Time in Hollywood as Rick Dalton; 5. Robert De Niro – The Irishman as Frank Sheeran	1. **Scarlett Johansson – Marriage Story as Nicole Barber**; 2. Renée Zellweger – Judy as Judy Garland; 3. Charlize Theron – Bombshell as Megyn Kelly; 4. Saoirse Ronan – Little Women as Josephine "Jo" March; 5. Awkwafina – The Farewell as Billi Wang **(TIE)** Lupita Nyong'o – Us as Adelaide Wilson / Red **(TIE)**
Best Supporting Actor	Best Supporting Actress
1. **Brad Pitt – Once Upon a Time in Hollywood as Cliff Booth**; 2. Willem Dafoe – The Lighthouse as Thomas Wake; 3. Joe Pesci – The Irishman as Russell Bufalino; 4. Al Pacino – The Irishman as Jimmy Hoffa; 5. Shia LaBeouf – Honey Boy as James Lort	1. **Laura Dern – Marriage Story as Nora Fanshaw**; 2. Margot Robbie – Bombshell as Kayla Pospisil; 3. Florence Pugh – Little Women as Amy March; 4. Jennifer Lopez – Hustlers as Ramona Vega; 5. Annette Bening – The Report as Dianne Feinstein
Best Documentary Film	Best Foreign Language Film
1. **Apollo 11**; 2. One Child Nation; 3. American Factory; 4. Honeyland; 5. For Sama	1. **Parasite**; 2. Pain and Glory; 3. The Farwell; 4. Les Misérables; 5. Portrait of a Lady on Fire
Best Animated Film	Best Screenplay
1. **Toy Story 4**; 2. I Lost My Body	1. **Noah Baumbach – Marriage Story**; 2. Steven Zaillian – The Irishman
Best Cinematography	Best Musical Score
1. **Roger Deakins – 1917**; 2. Hong Kyung-pyo – Parasite	1. **Thomas Newman – 1917**; 2. Alexandre Desplat – Little Women

=== Special award ===
==== Russell Smith Award ====
- **The Lighthouse**, for "best low-budget or cutting-edge independent film"
