= Dallas–Fort Worth Film Critics Association Awards 2024 =

Annual US film critics awards

30th Dallas–Fort Worth Film Critics Association Awards
- Date: December 18, 2024
- Location: Dallas, Texas
- Country: United States
- Presented by: Dallas–Fort Worth Film Critics Association
- Website: dfwcritics.com

The 30th Dallas–Fort Worth Film Critics Association Awards, honoring the best in film for 2024, were announced on December 18, 2024.

Anora received the most awards, winning three for Best Film, Best Director (Sean Baker), and Best Actress (Mikey Madison). The Brutalist tied for second place, winning Best Screenplay (Brady Corbet and Mona Fastvold) and Best Supporting Actor (Guy Pearce). The other acting winners were Ralph Fiennes for Best Actor (Conclave) and Zoe Saldaña for Best Supporting Actress (Emilia Pérez). The Wild Robot won Best Animated Film and Best Musical Score for composer Kris Bowers while The Seed of the Sacred Fig won for Best Foreign Language Film and the Russell Smith Award—a special award designated "for low-budget and/or cutting-edge films".

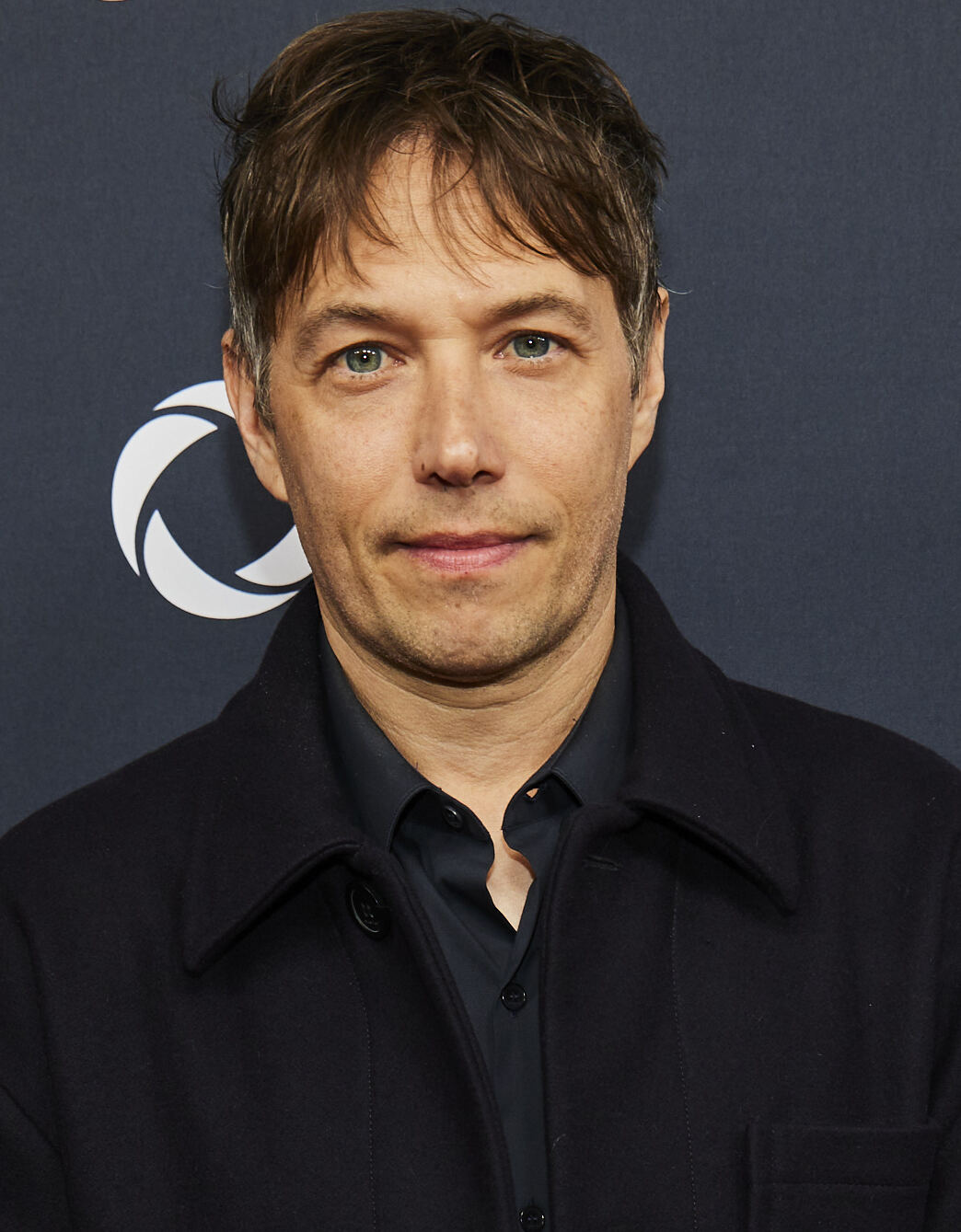
Sean Baker, Best Director winner

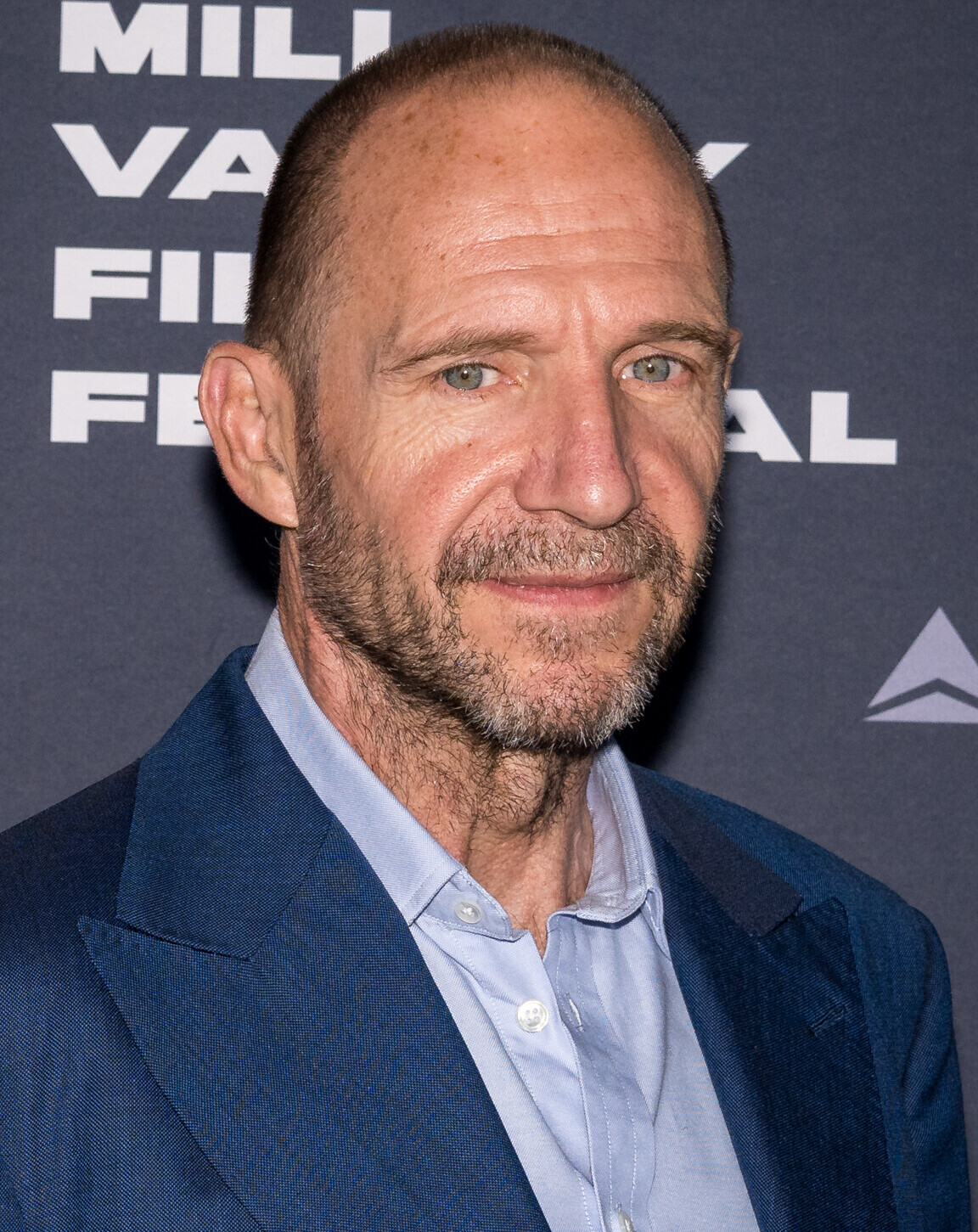
Ralph Fiennes, Best Actor winner

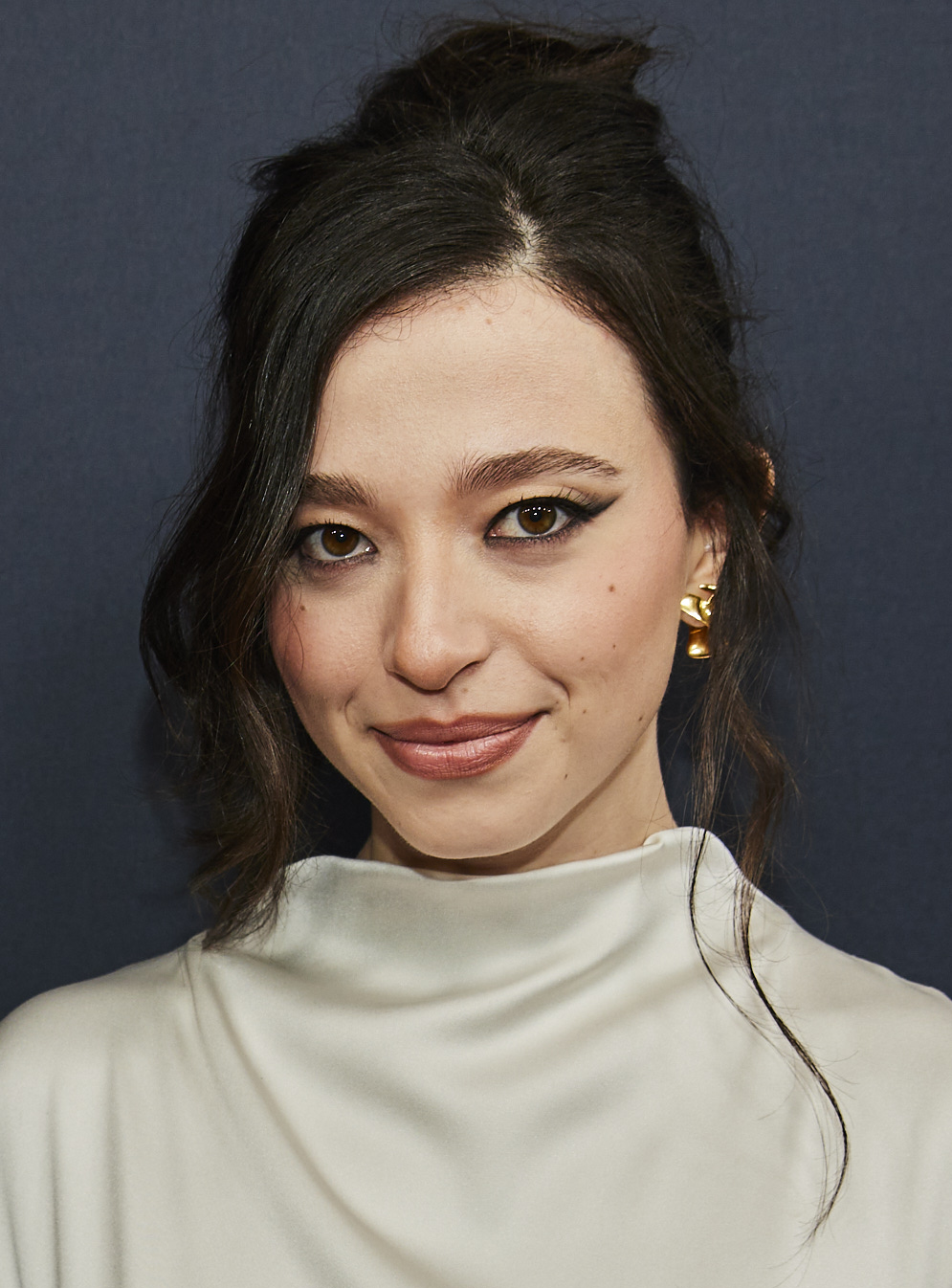
Mikey Madison, Best Actress winner

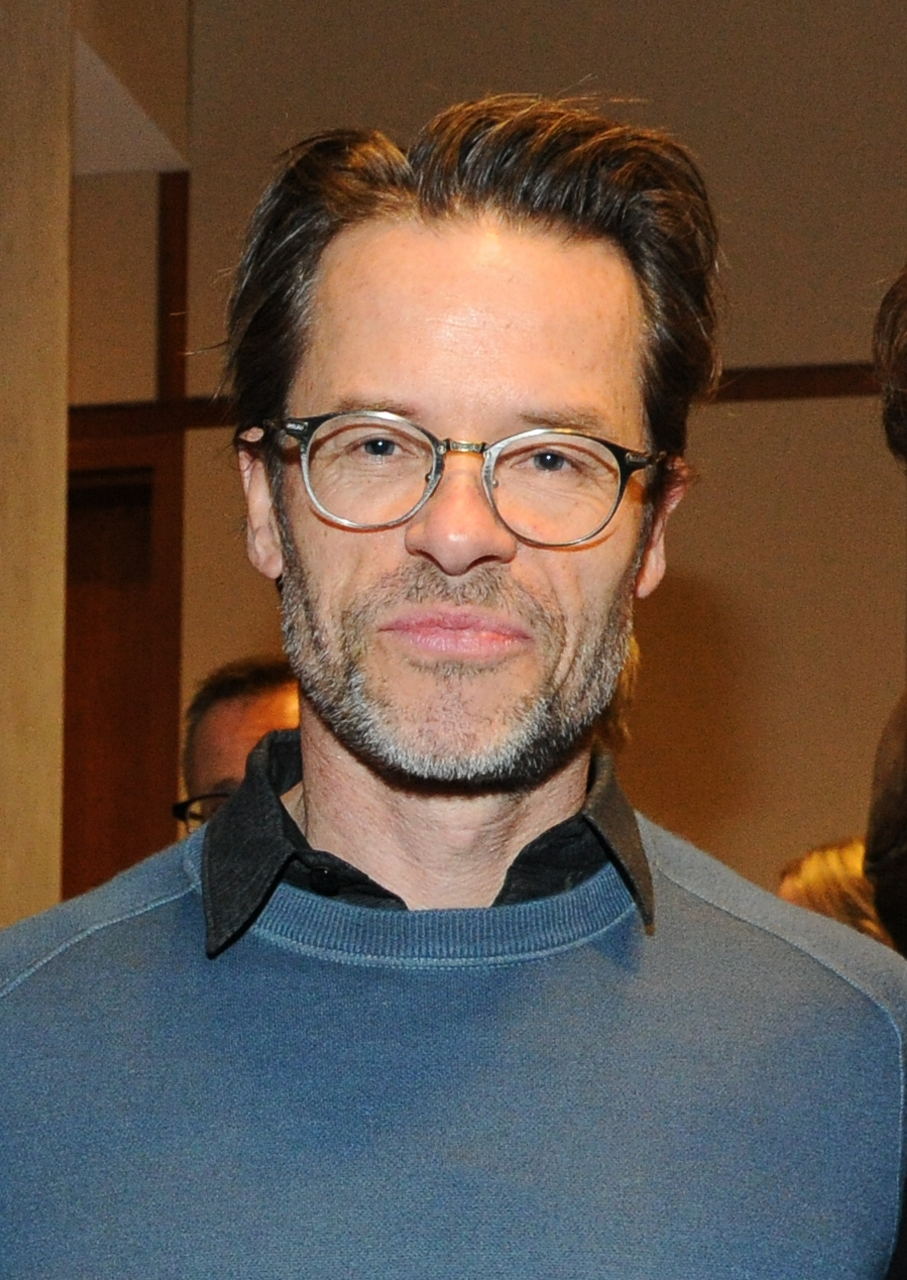
Guy Pearce, Best Supporting Actor winner

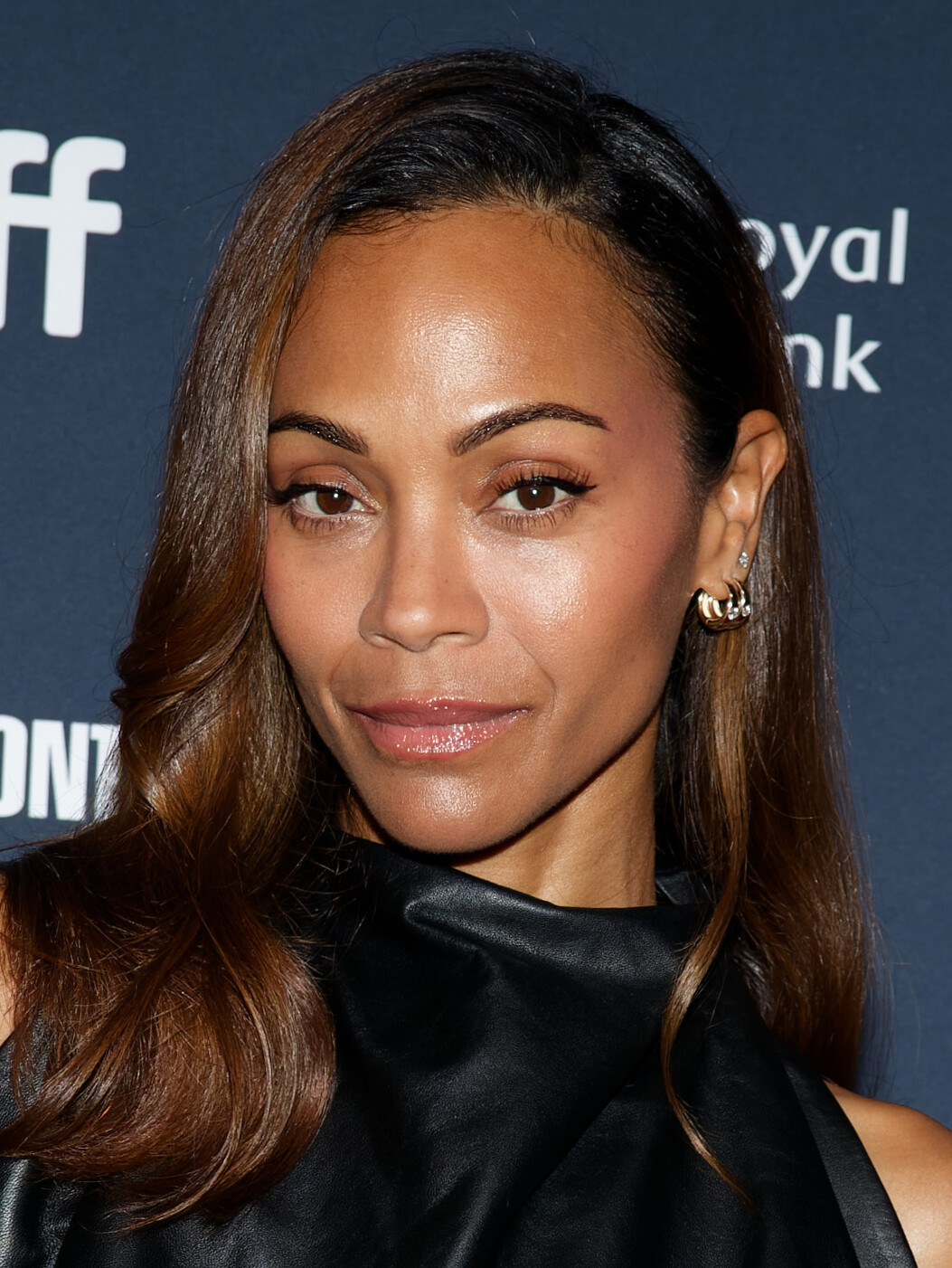
Zoe Saldaña, Best Supporting Actress winner

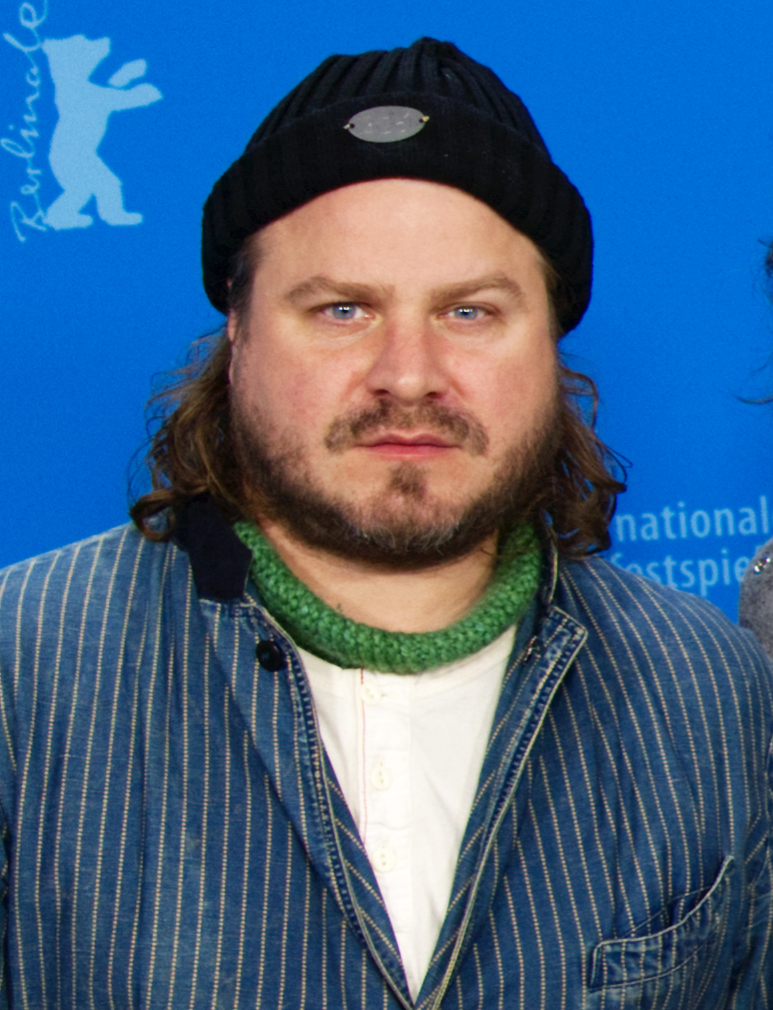
Brady Corbet, Best Screenplay co-winner

== Winners and nominees ==
=== Category awards ===
Winners are listed first and highlighted with boldface. Other films ranked by the annual poll are listed in order. While most categories saw 5 honorees named, categories ranged from as many as 10 (Best Film) to as few as 2 (Best Animated Film, Best Screenplay, Best Cinematography, and Best Musical Score).

Best Picture	Best Director
1. **Anora**; 2. The Brutalist; 3. Conclave; 4. Dune: Part Two; 5. A Complete Unknown; 6. The Substance; 7. Wicked; 8. Nickel Boys; 9. A Real Pain; 10. Sing Sing	1. **Sean Baker – Anora**; 2. Brady Corbet – The Brutalist; 3. Denis Villeneuve – Dune: Part Two; 4. Coralie Fargeat – The Substance; 5. RaMell Ross – Nickel Boys
Best Actor	Best Actress
1. **Ralph Fiennes – Conclave as Cardinal Thomas Lawrence**; 2. Adrien Brody – The Brutalist as László Tóth; 3. Timothée Chalamet – A Complete Unknown as Bob Dylan; 4. Colman Domingo – Sing Sing as John "Divine G" Whitfield; 5. Hugh Grant – Heretic as Mr. Reed	1. **Mikey Madison – Anora as Anora "Ani" Mikheeva**; 2. Demi Moore – The Substance as Elisabeth Sparkle; 3. Karla Sofía Gascón – Emilia Pérez as Emilia Pérez / Juan "Manitas" Del Monte; 4. Angelina Jolie – Maria as Maria Callas; 5. Marianne Jean-Baptiste – Hard Truths as Pansy Deacon **(TIE)**; 5. Nicole Kidman – Babygirl as Romy Mathis **(TIE)**
Best Supporting Actor	Best Supporting Actress
1. **Guy Pearce – The Brutalist as Harrison Lee Van Buren Sr.**; 2. Kieran Culkin – A Real Pain as Benji Kaplan; 3. Edward Norton – A Complete Unknown as Pete Seeger; 4. Denzel Washington – Gladiator II as Macrinus; 5. Clarence Maclin – Sing Sing as Clarence "Divine Eye" Maclin	1. **Zoe Saldaña – Emilia Pérez as Rita Mora Castro**; 2. Margaret Qualley – The Substance as Sue; 3. Ariana Grande – Wicked as Galinda "Glinda" Upland; 4. Danielle Deadwyler – The Piano Lesson as Berniece; 5. Monica Barbaro – A Complete Unknown as Joan Baez
Best Documentary Film	Best Foreign Language Film
1. **Sugarcane**; 2. Daughters; 3. Will & Harper; 4. Super/Man: The Christopher Reeve Story; 5. Dahomey	1. **The Seed of the Sacred Fig**; 2. Emilia Pérez; 3. All We Imagine as Light; 4. I'm Still Here; 5. Kneecap
Best Animated Film	Best Screenplay
1. **The Wild Robot**; 2. Flow	1. **Brady Corbet and Mona Fastvold – The Brutalist**; 2. Sean Baker – Anora
Best Cinematography	Best Musical Score
1. **Greig Fraser – Dune: Part Two**; 2. Lol Crawley – The Brutalist	1. **Kris Bowers – The Wild Robot**; 2. Trent Reznor and Atticus Ross – Challengers

=== Special award ===
==== Russell Smith Award ====
- **The Seed of the Sacred Fig** (for "best low-budget or cutting-edge independent film")
