= Dallas–Fort Worth Film Critics Association Awards 2025 =

Annual US film critics awards

31st Dallas–Fort Worth Film Critics Association Awards
- Date: December 17, 2025
- Location: Dallas, Texas
- Country: United States
- Presented by: Dallas–Fort Worth Film Critics Association
- Website: dfwcritics.com

The 31st Dallas–Fort Worth Film Critics Association Awards, honoring the best in film for 2025, were announced on December 17, 2025.

One Battle After Another received the most awards with five wins, winning Best Picture, Best Director and Best Screenplay (both for Paul Thomas Anderson), Best Actor (Leonardo DiCaprio), and Best Supporting Actress (Teyana Taylor). Other multiple-winning films include Sinners, which won Best Cinematography (Autumn Durald Arkapaw) and Best Musical Score (Ludwig Göransson), and Sentimental Value, which won Best Foreign Language Film and Best Supporting Actor (Stellan Skarsgård). The winners for the remaining categories were Rose Byrne for Best Actress (If I Had Legs I'd Kick You), The Perfect Neighbor for Best Documentary Film, and KPop Demon Hunters for Best Animated Film.

== Winners and nominees ==
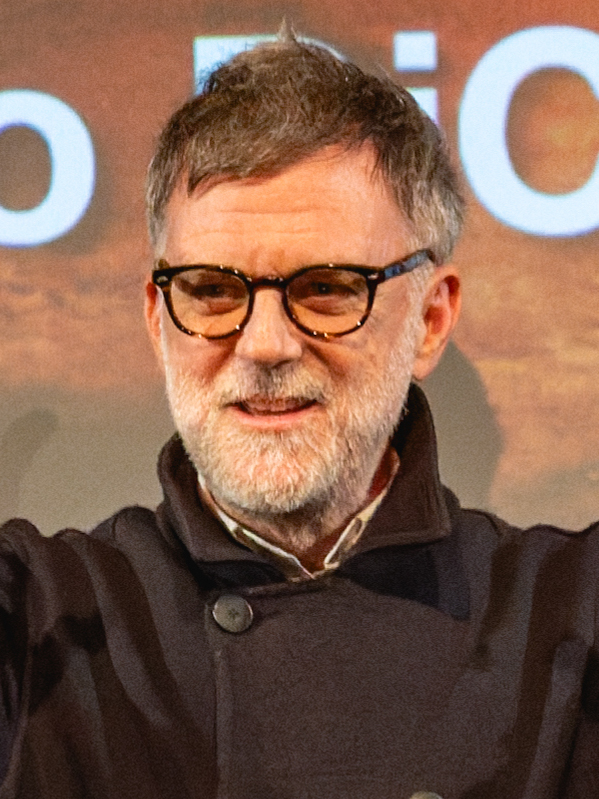
Paul Thomas Anderson, Best Director and Best Screenplay winner

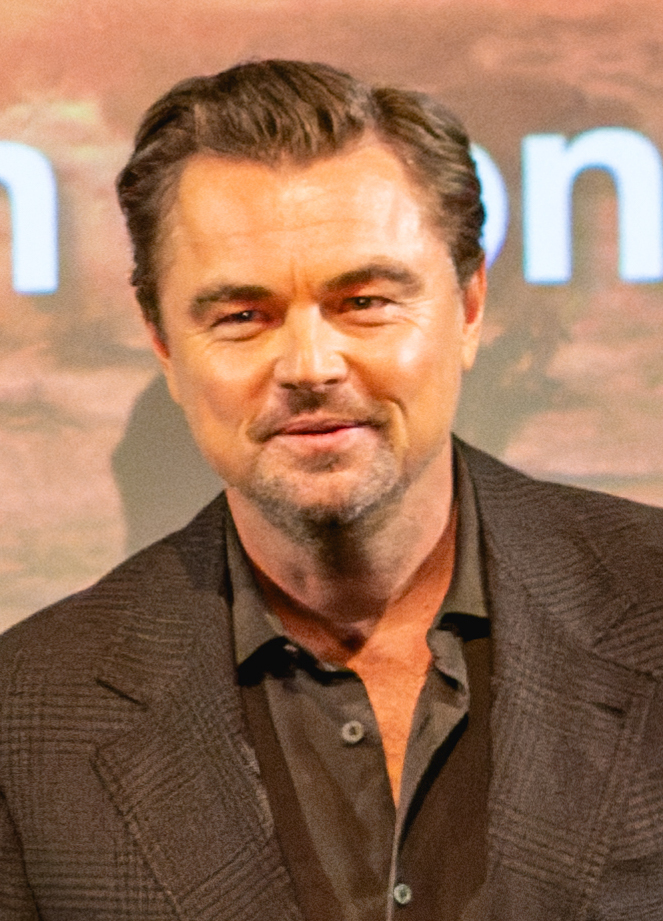
Leonardo DiCaprio, Best Actor winner

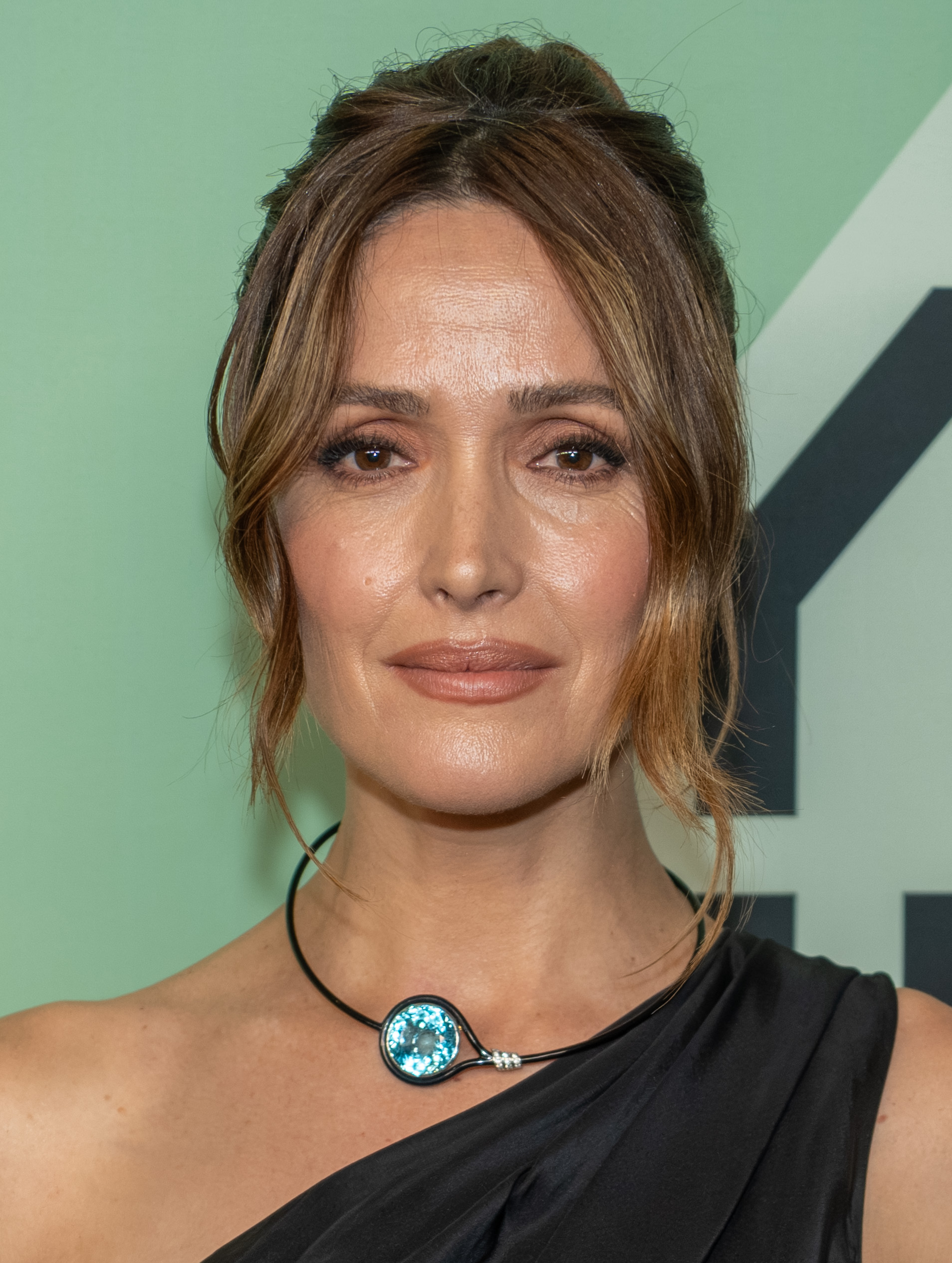
Rose Byrne, Best Actress winner

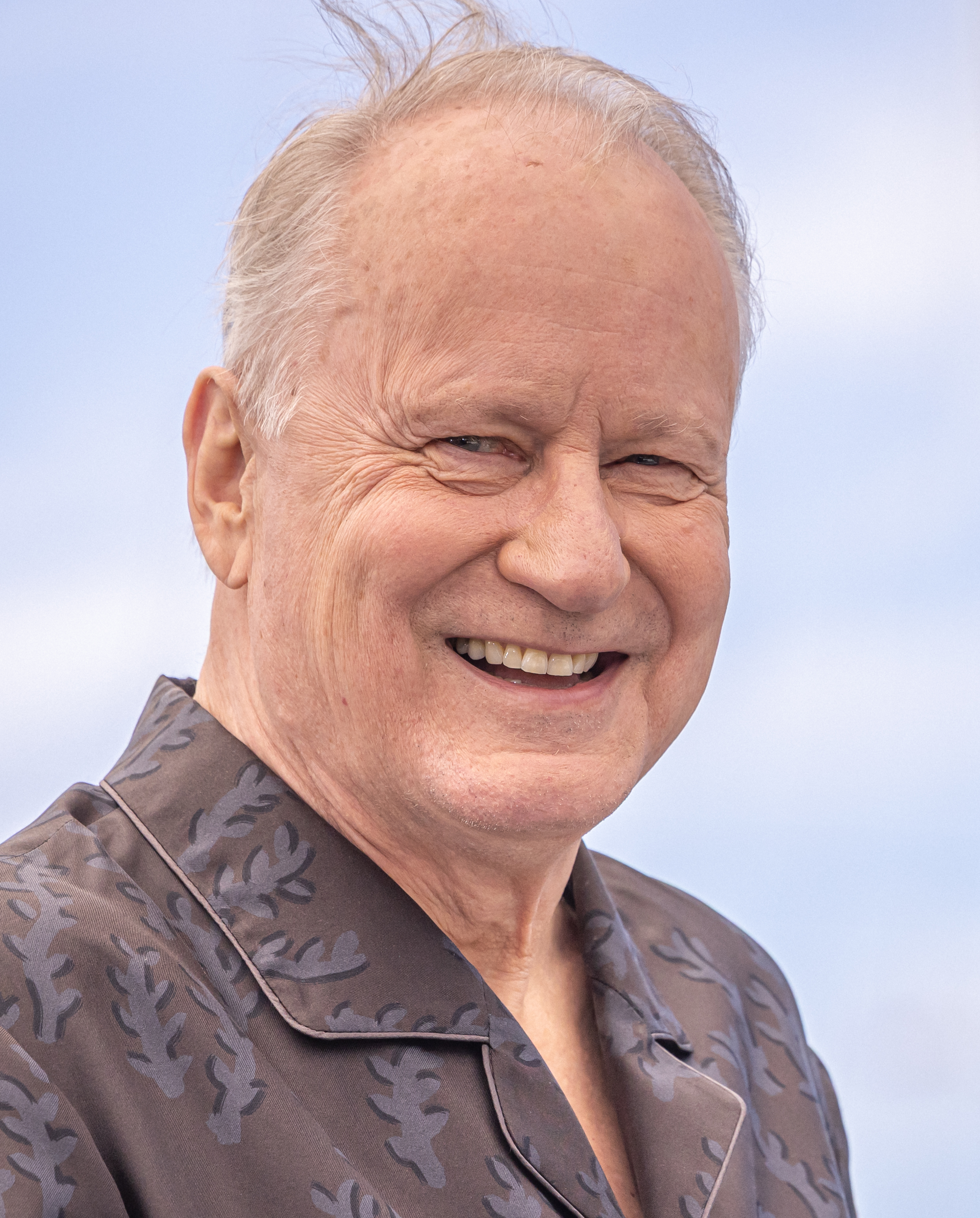
Stellan Skarsgård, Best Supporting Actor winner

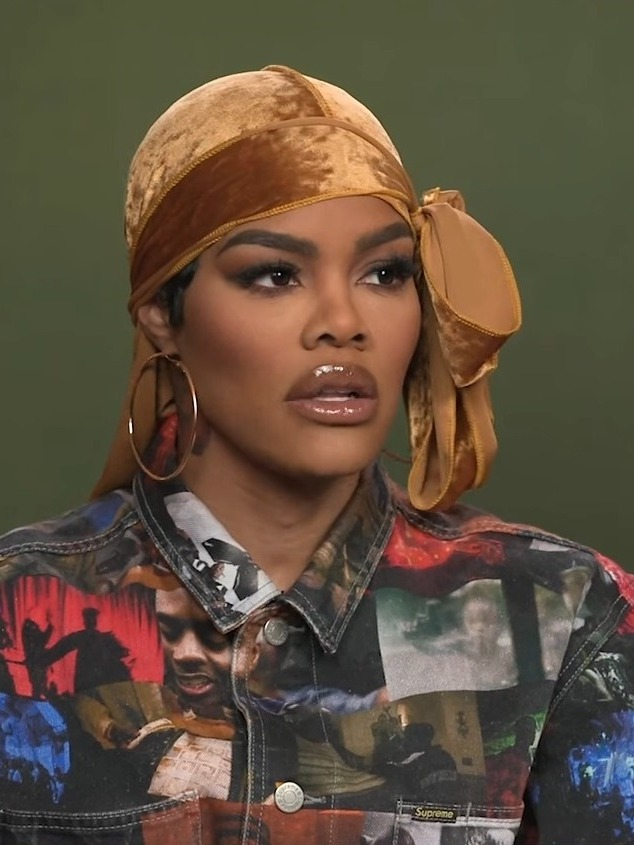
Teyana Taylor, Best Supporting Actress winner

=== Category awards ===
Winners are listed first and highlighted with boldface. Other films ranked by the annual poll are listed in order. While most categories saw 5 honorees named, categories ranged from as many as 10 (Best Film) to as few as 2 (Best Animated Film, Best Screenplay, Best Cinematography, and Best Musical Score).

Best Picture	Best Director
1. **One Battle After Another**; 2. Sinners; 3. Marty Supreme; 4. Hamnet; 5. Sentimental Value; 6. Train Dreams; 7. Frankenstein; 8. Jay Kelly; 9. Bugonia; 10. It Was Just an Accident	1. **Paul Thomas Anderson – One Battle After Another**; 2. Ryan Coogler – Sinners; 3. Chloé Zhao – Hamnet; 4. Josh Safdie – Marty Supreme; 5. Guillermo del Toro – Frankenstein
Best Actor	Best Actress
1. **Leonardo DiCaprio – One Battle After Another as Bob Ferguson**; 2. Timothée Chalamet – Marty Supreme as Marty Mauser; 3. Michael B. Jordan – Sinners as Elijah "Smoke" Moore / Elias "Stack" Moore; 4. Ethan Hawke – Blue Moon as Lorenz Hart; 5. Joel Edgerton – Train Dreams as Robert Grainier	1. **Rose Byrne – If I Had Legs I'd Kick You as Linda**; 2. Jessie Buckley – Hamnet as Agnes Shakespeare; 3. Renate Reinsve – Sentimental Value as Nora Borg; 4. Emma Stone – Bugonia as Michelle Fuller; 5. Chase Infiniti – One Battle After Another as Willa Ferguson
Best Supporting Actor	Best Supporting Actress
1. **Stellan Skarsgård – Sentimental Value as Gustav Borg**; 2. Benicio del Toro – One Battle After Another as Sensei Sergio St. Carlos; 3. Sean Penn – One Battle After Another as Col. Steven J. Lockjaw; 4. Paul Mescal – Hamnet as William Shakespeare; 5. Adam Sandler – Jay Kelly as Ron Sukenick	1. **Teyana Taylor – One Battle After Another as Perfidia Beverly Hills**; 2. Amy Madigan – Weapons as Gladys; 3. Inga Ibsdotter Lilleaas – Sentimental Value as Agnes Borg Pettersen; 4. Odessa A'zion – Marty Supreme as Rachel Mizler; 5. Wunmi Mosaku – Sinners as Annie
Best Documentary Film	Best Foreign Language Film
1. **The Perfect Neighbor**; 2. 2000 Meters to Andriivka; 3. Orwell: 2+2=5; 4. Cover-Up; 5. Come See Me in the Good Light	1. **Sentimental Value • Norway**; 2. It Was Just an Accident • Iran; 3. The Secret Agent • Brazil; 4. No Other Choice • South Korea; 5. Sirāt • Spain
Best Animated Film	Best Screenplay
1. **KPop Demon Hunters**; 2. Arco	1. **One Battle After Another – Paul Thomas Anderson**; 2. Sinners – Ryan Coogler
Best Cinematography	Best Musical Score
1. **Sinners – Autumn Durald Arkapaw**; 2. Train Dreams – Adolpho Veloso	1. **Sinners – Ludwig Göransson**; 2. Frankenstein – Alexandre Desplat

=== Special award ===
==== Russell Smith Award ====
- **It Was Just an Accident** (for "best low-budget or cutting-edge independent film")
