= Dallas–Fort Worth Film Critics Association Awards 2002 =

Annual US film awards ceremony

8th Dallas-Fort Worth Film Critics Association Awards
- Date: January 6, 2003
- Location: Dallas, Texas
- Country: United States
- Presented by: Dallas–Fort Worth Film Critics Association
- Hosted by: Gary Cogill
- Website: dfwfilmcritics.net

The 8th Dallas–Fort Worth Film Critics Association Awards, honoring the best in film for 2002, were given on January 6, 2003. The organization, founded in 1990, includes 59 film critics for print, radio, television, and internet publications based in north Texas.

== Top 10 films ==
1. Chicago (Academy Award for Best Picture)
2. Far from Heaven
3. The Lord of the Rings: The Two Towers
4. The Pianist
5. About Schmidt
6. Gangs of New York
7. Adaptation.
8. Road to Perdition
9. Catch Me If You Can
10. The Hours

== Winners ==
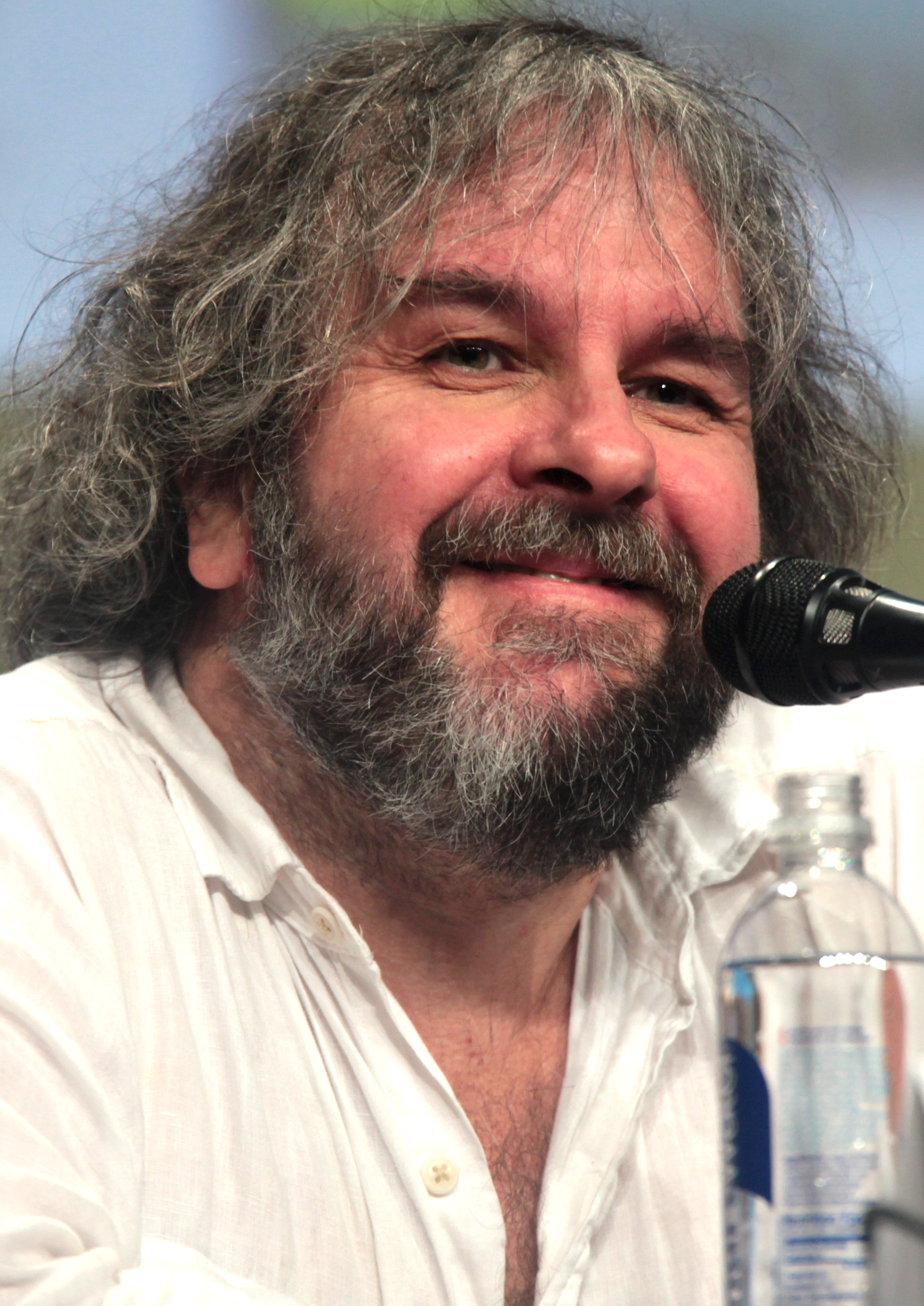
Peter Jackson, Best Director winner

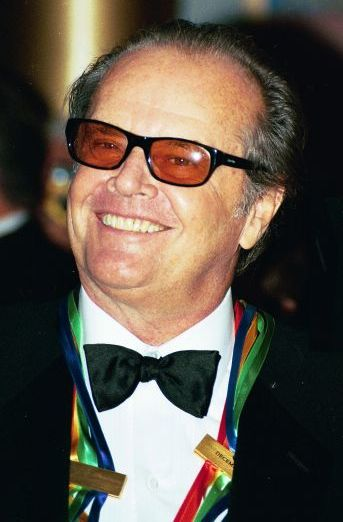
Jack Nicholson, Best Actor winner

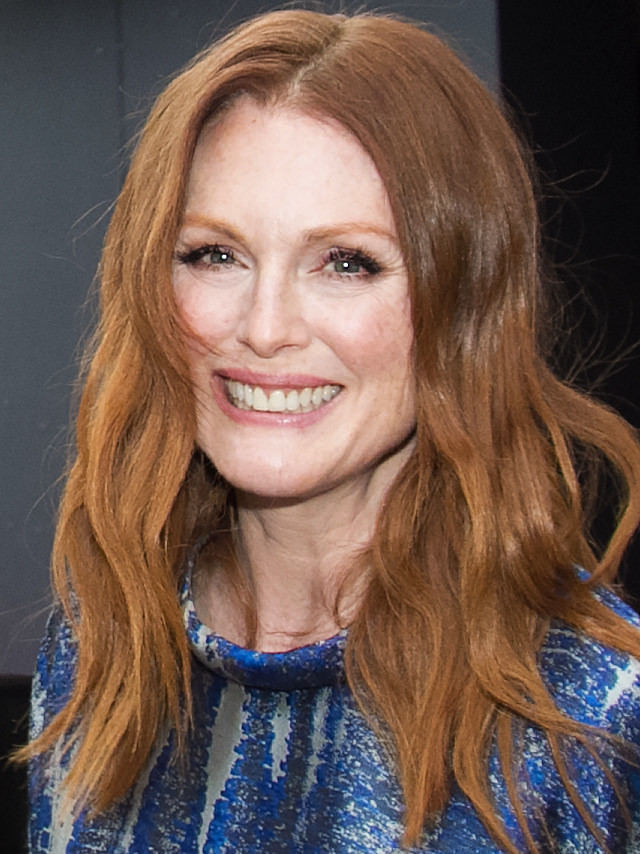
Julianne Moore, Best Actress winner

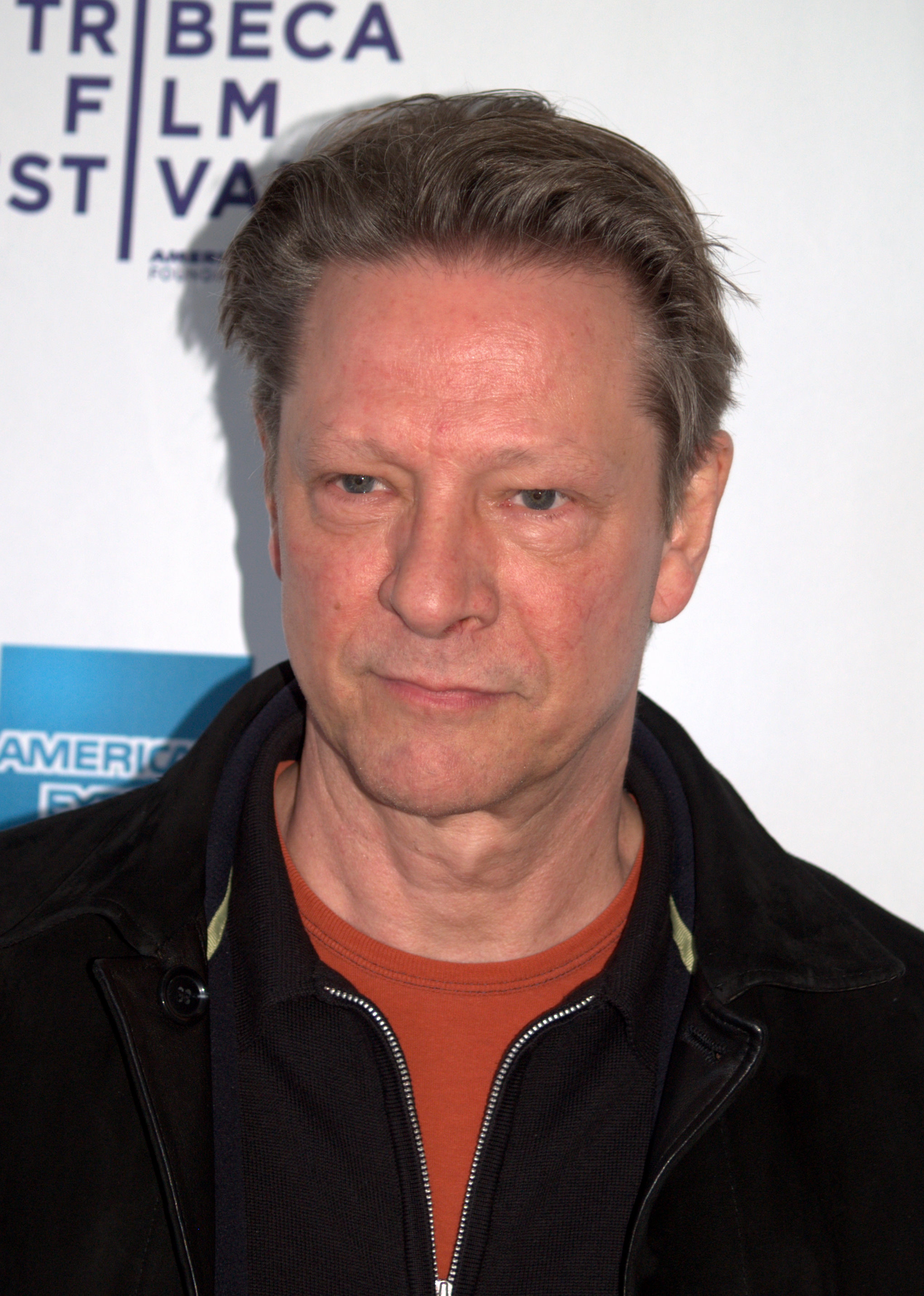
Chris Cooper, Best Supporting Actor winner

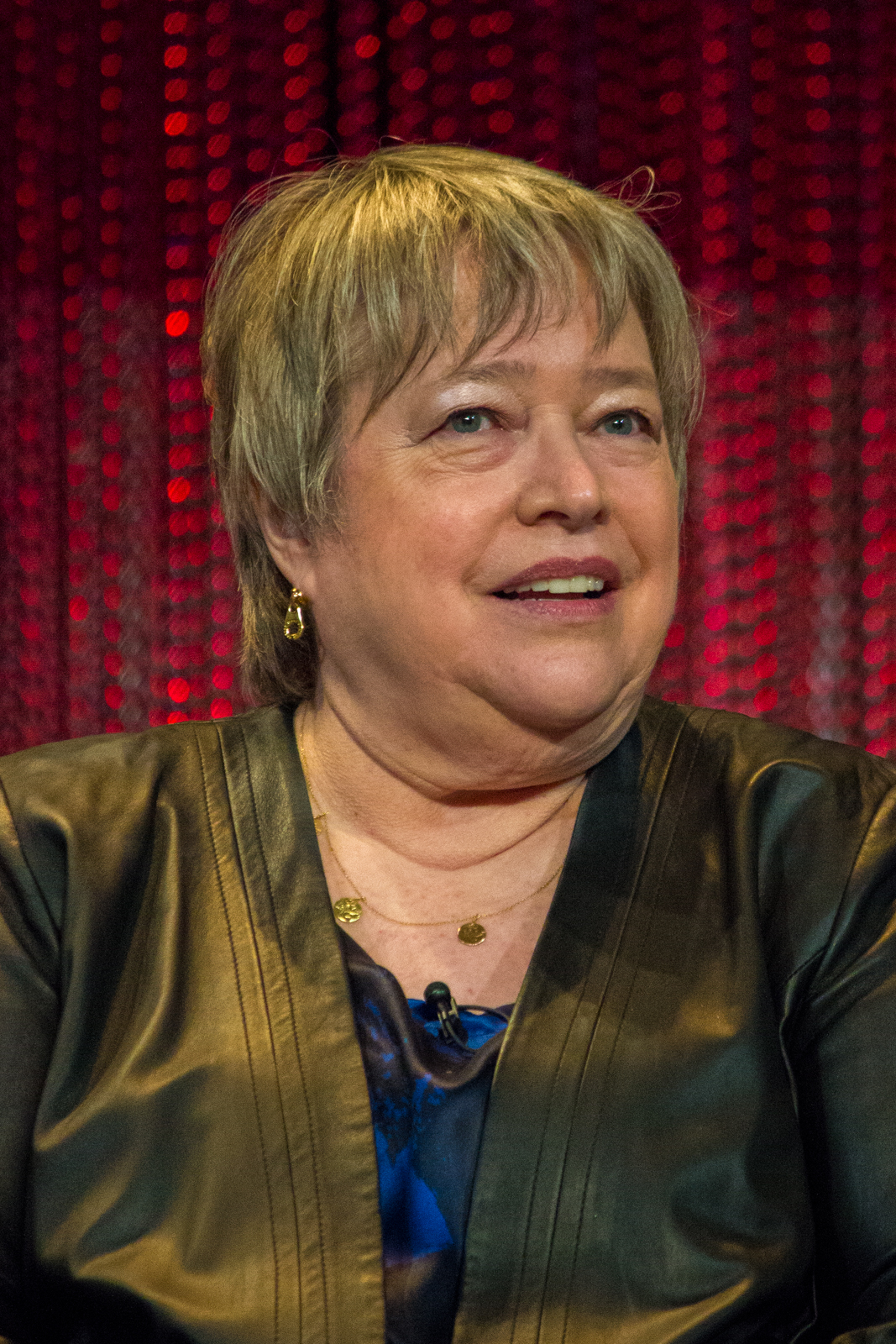
Kathy Bates, Best Supporting Actress winner

- Best Actor:
  - Jack Nicholson – About Schmidt as Warren R. Schmidt
- Best Actress:
  - Julianne Moore – Far from Heaven
- Best Animated Film:
  - Spirited Away (Sen to Chihiro no kamikakushi)
- Best Cinematography:
  - Far from Heaven – Edward Lachman
- Best Director:
  - Peter Jackson – The Lord of the Rings: The Two Towers
- Best Documentary Film:
  - Bowling for Columbine
- Best Film:
  - Chicago
- Best Foreign Language Film:
  - And Your Mother Too (Y tu mamá también) • Mexico
- Best Supporting Actor:
  - Chris Cooper – Adaptation. as John Laroche
- Best Supporting Actress:
  - Kathy Bates – About Schmidt
- Worst Film:
  - FeardotCom
