= Russell Smith Award =

Annual US film award

The Russell Smith Award is an annual award presented by the Dallas–Fort Worth Film Critics Association to "the best low-budget and cutting-edge independent film" since its inception in 2008. The award is named in honor of late Dallas Morning News film critic Russell Smith.

== Winners ==
- 2008: Wendy and Lucy - Kelly Reichardt
- 2009: Precious - Lee Daniels
- 2010: Winter's Bone - Debra Granik
- 2011: We Need to Talk About Kevin - Lynne Ramsay
- 2012: Beasts of the Southern Wild - Benh Zeitlin
- 2013: Fruitvale Station - Ryan Coogler
- 2014: Boyhood - Richard Linklater
- 2015: Tangerine - Sean Baker
- 2016: Moonlight - Barry Jenkins
- 2017: The Florida Project - Sean Baker
- 2018: The Rider - Chloe Zhao
- 2019: The Lighthouse - Robert Eggers
- 2020: Minari - Lee Isaac Chung
- 2021: Flee - Jonas Poher Rasmussen
- 2022: EO - Jerzy Skolimowski
- 2023: The Zone of Interest – Jonathan Glazer
- 2024: The Seed of the Sacred Fig – Mohammad Rasoulof
- 2025: It Was Just an Accident – Jafar Panahi

== Multiple wins ==
- Sean Baker - 2

== See also ==
- John Cassavetes Award
- NBR Freedom of Expression
- Academy Award for Best Picture
