= Dallas–Fort Worth Film Critics Association Award for Best Documentary Film =

Annual US film award

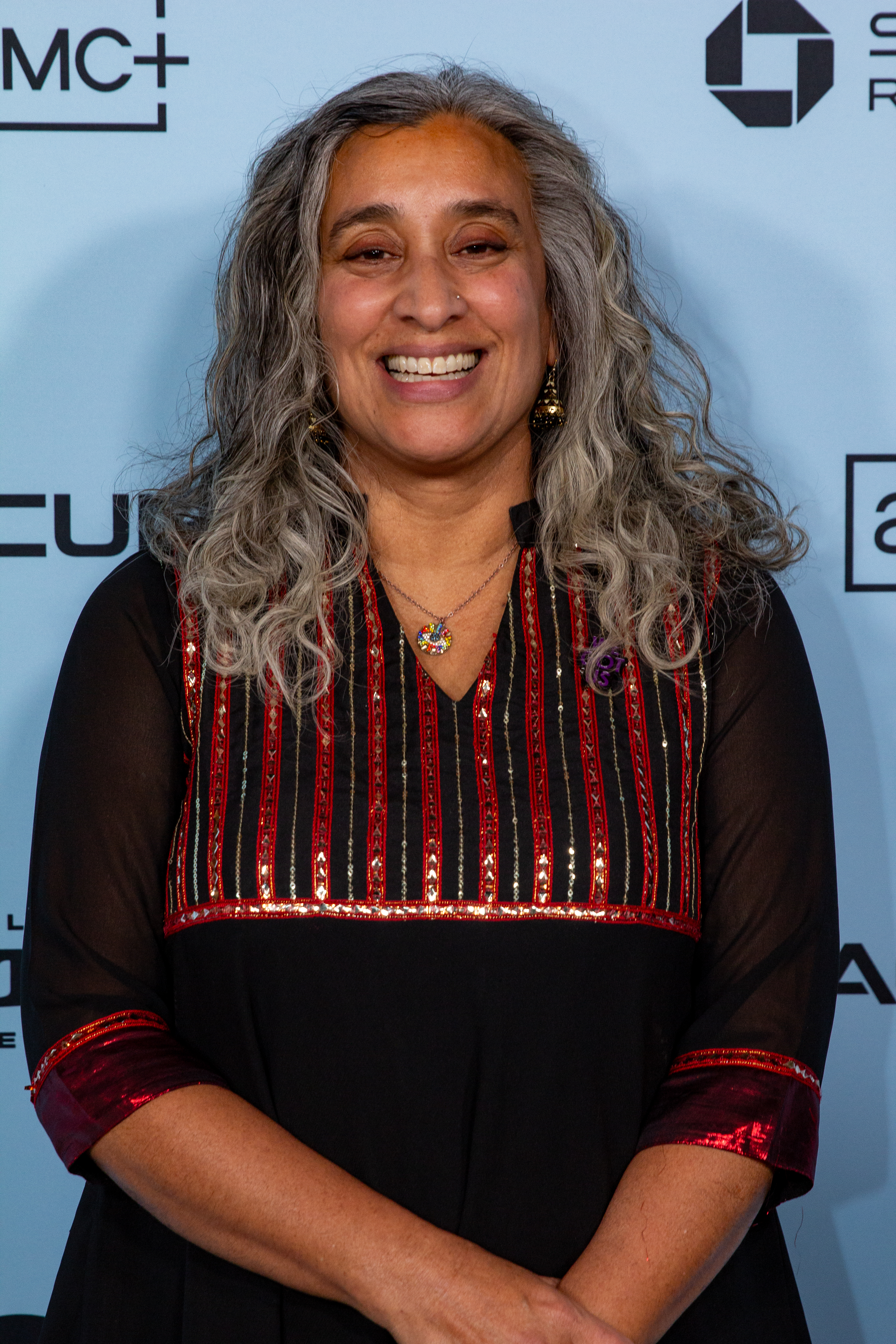
- The 2025 recipient: Geeta Gandbhir
- Awarded for: Best Achievement in Documentary Filmmaking
- Country: United States
- Presented by: Dallas–Fort Worth Film Critics Association
- First award: Michael Moore; Bowling for Columbine (2002)
- Currently held by: Geeta Gandbhir; The Perfect Neighbor (2025)
- Website: dfwcritics.com

The Dallas–Fort Worth Film Critics Association Award for Best Documentary Film is an award presented by the Dallas–Fort Worth Film Critics Association (DFWFCA) to honor an outstanding documentary film.

== History ==
Although the DFWFCA began handing out awards in 1990, they first added this category in 2002. To date, only three directors have earned the honor more than once: Davis Guggenheim (2006, 2010), Michael Moore (2002, 2004), Matthew Heineman (2017, 2023), and Morgan Neville (2013, 2018)

== Winners ==
- † = Winner of the Academy Award for Best Documentary Feature Film
- ‡ = Nominated for the Academy Award for Best Documentary Feature Film

=== 2000s ===
Year	Winner	Director(s)
2002	Bowling for Columbine †	Michael Moore
2003	Capturing the Friedmans ‡	Andrew Jarecki
2004	Fahrenheit 9/11	Michael Moore
2005	Murderball ‡	Henry-Alex Rubin and Dana Adam Shapiro
2006	An Inconvenient Truth †	Davis Guggenheim
2007	The King of Kong: A Fistful of Quarters	Seth Gordon
2008	Man on Wire †	James Marsh
2009	The Cove †	Louie Psihoyos

=== 2010s ===
Year	Winner	Director
2010	Waiting for "Superman"	Davis Guggenheim
2011	Cave of Forgotten Dreams	Werner Herzog
2012	Searching for Sugar Man †	Malik Bendjelloul
2013	20 Feet from Stardom †	Morgan Neville
2014	Citizenfour †	Laura Poitras
2015	Amy †	Asif Kapadia
2016	Tower	Keith Maitland
2017	City of Ghosts	Matthew Heineman
2018	Won't You Be My Neighbor?	Morgan Neville
2019	Apollo 11	Todd Douglas Miller

=== 2020s ===
Year	Winner	Director(s)
2020	Time ‡	Garrett Bradley
2021	Summer of Soul †	Ahmir "Questlove" Thompson
2022	Good Night Oppy	Ryan White
2023	American Symphony	Matthew Heineman
2024	Sugarcane ‡	Julian Brave NoiseCat and Emily Kassie
2025	The Perfect Neighbor	Geeta Gandbhir
