= Dallas–Fort Worth Film Critics Association Award for Best Musical Score =

Film score award

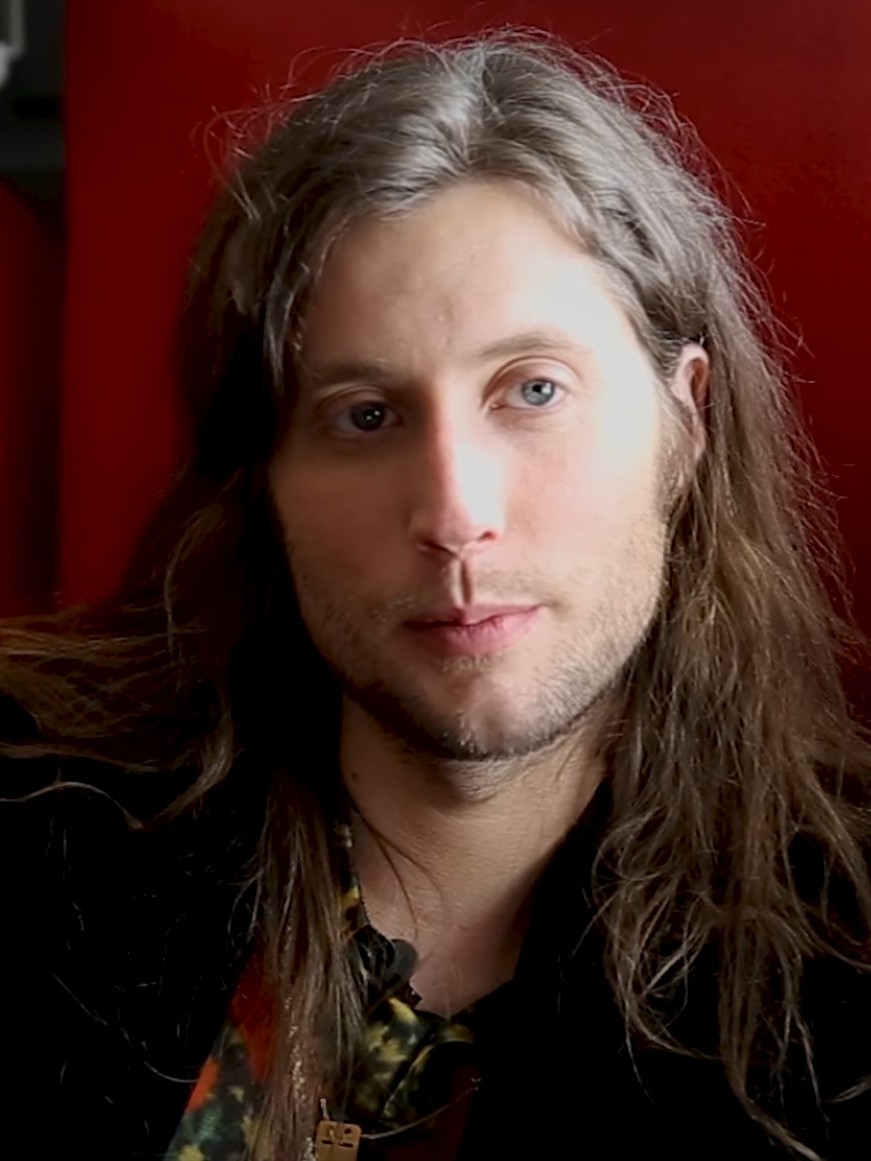
- The 2025 recipient: Ludwig Göransson
- Awarded for: Best Achievement in Musical Scoring
- Country: United States
- Presented by: Dallas–Fort Worth Film Critics Association
- First award: John Williams; Lincoln (2012)
- Currently held by: Ludwig Göransson; Sinners (2025)
- Website: dfwcritics.com

The Dallas–Fort Worth Film Critics Association Award for Best Musical Score is an award presented by the Dallas–Fort Worth Film Critics Association. It is given in honor of a composer who has delivered an outstanding film score.

== Winners ==
=== 2010s ===
Year	Winner(s)	Film
2012	John Williams	Lincoln
2013	Steven Price	Gravity
2014	Hans Zimmer	Interstellar
2015	Bryce Dessner, Alva Noto, and Ryuichi Sakamoto	The Revenant
2016	Justin Hurwitz	La La Land
2017	Alexandre Desplat	The Shape of Water
2018	Alexandre Desplat	Isle of Dogs
2019	Thomas Newman	1917

=== 2020s ===
Year	Winner(s)	Film
2020	Trent Reznor and Atticus Ross	Soul
2021	Hans Zimmer	Dune
2022	Alexandre Desplat	Guillermo del Toro's Pinocchio
2023	Robbie Robertson (posthumous)	Killers of the Flower Moon
2024	Kris Bowers	The Wild Robot
2025	Ludwig Göransson	Sinners

== Multiple wins ==
3 wins

- Alexandre Desplat (2 consecutive)

2 wins

- Hans Zimmer
