= Dallas–Fort Worth Film Critics Association Award for Best Supporting Actress =

Annual US film award

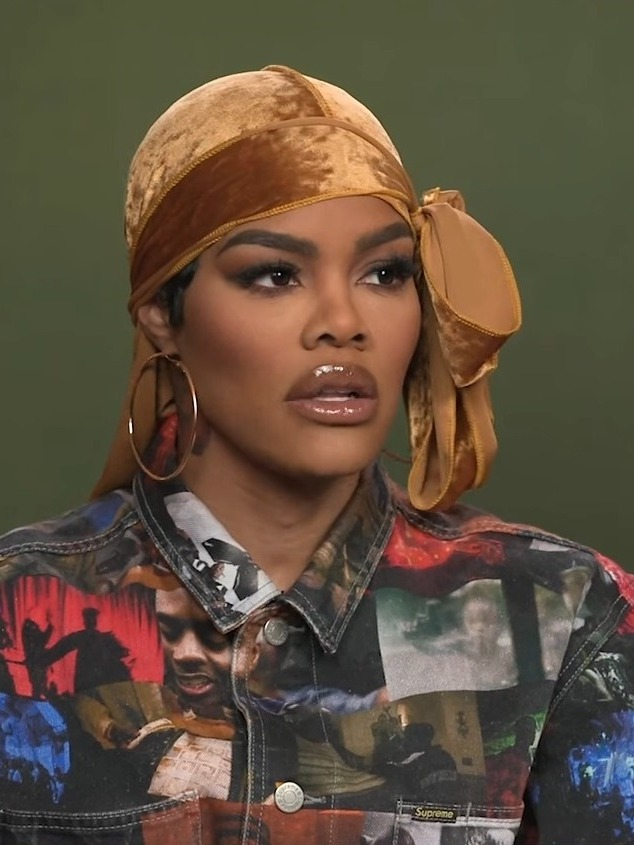
- The 2025 recipient: Teyana Taylor
- Awarded for: Best Performance by an Actress in a Supporting Role
- Country: United States
- Presented by: Dallas–Fort Worth Film Critics Association
- First award: Whoopi Goldberg; Ghost (1990)
- Currently held by: Teyana Taylor; One Battle After Another (2025)
- Website: dfwcritics.com

The Dallas–Fort Worth Film Critics Association Award for Best Supporting Actress is an award presented by the Dallas–Fort Worth Film Critics Association. It is given in honor of an actress who has delivered an outstanding performance in a supporting role.

== Winners ==
- † = Winner of the Academy Award for Best Supporting Actress

=== 1990s ===
| Year | Winner | Film | Role |
|---|---|---|---|
| 1990 | Whoopi Goldberg † | Ghost | Oda Mae Brown |
| 1991 | Mercedes Ruehl † | The Fisher King | Anne Napolitano |
| 1992 | Judy Davis | Husbands and Wives | Sally Simmons |
| 1993 | Rosie Perez | Fearless | Carla Rodrigo |
| 1994 | Dianne Wiest † | Bullets Over Broadway | Helen Sinclair |
| 1995 | Mira Sorvino † | Mighty Aphrodite | Leslie / Linda Ash |
| 1996 | Juliette Binoche † | The English Patient | Hana |
| 1997 | Kim Basinger † | L.A. Confidential | Lynn Bracken |
| 1998 | Joan Allen | Pleasantville | Betty Parker |
| 1999 | Julianne Moore | Cookie's Fortune | Cora Duvall |

=== 2000s ===
| Year | Winner | Film | Role |
|---|---|---|---|
| 2000 | Kate Hudson | Almost Famous | Penny Lane |
| 2001 | Marisa Tomei | In the Bedroom | Natalie Strout |
| 2002 | Kathy Bates | About Schmidt | Roberta Hertzel |
| 2003 | Renée Zellweger † | Cold Mountain | Ruby Thewes |
| 2004 | Virginia Madsen | Sideways | Maya Randall |
| 2005 | Catherine Keener | Capote | Nelle Harper Lee |
| 2006 | Cate Blanchett | Notes on a Scandal | Sheba Hart |
| 2007 | Tilda Swinton † | Michael Clayton | Karen Crowder |
| 2008 | Viola Davis | Doubt | Mrs. Miller |
| 2009 | Mo'Nique † | Precious | Mary Lee Johnston |

=== 2010s ===
| Year | Winner | Film | Role |
|---|---|---|---|
| 2010 | Melissa Leo † | The Fighter | Alice Eklund-Ward |
| 2011 | Shailene Woodley | The Descendants | Alexandra "Alex" King |
| 2012 | Sally Field | Lincoln | Mary Todd Lincoln |
| 2013 | Lupita Nyong'o † | 12 Years a Slave | Patsey |
| 2014 | Patricia Arquette † | Boyhood | Olivia Evans |
| 2015 | Rooney Mara | Carol | Therese Belivet |
| 2016 | Viola Davis † | Fences | Rose Maxson |
| 2017 | Allison Janney † | I, Tonya | LaVona Golden |
| 2018 | Regina King † | If Beale Street Could Talk | Sharon Rivers |
| 2019 | Laura Dern † | Marriage Story | Nora Fanshow |

=== 2020s ===
| Year | Winner | Film | Role |
|---|---|---|---|
| 2020 | Amanda Seyfried | Mank | Marion Davies |
| 2021 | Ariana DeBose † | West Side Story | Anita |
| 2022 | Kerry Condon | The Banshees of Inisherin | Siobhán Súilleabháin |
| 2023 | Da'Vine Joy Randolph † | The Holdovers | Mary Lamb |
| 2024 | Zoe Saldaña † | Emilia Pérez | Rita Mora Castro |
| 2025 | Teyana Taylor | One Battle After Another | Perfidia Beverly Hills |
