= Dallas–Fort Worth Film Critics Association Award for Best Screenplay =

Annual US film award

- Awarded for: Best Achievement in Screenwriting
- Country: United States
- Presented by: Dallas–Fort Worth Film Critics Association
- First award: Larry McMurtry and Diana Ossana; Brokeback Mountain (2005)
- Currently held by: Brady Corbet and Mona Fastvold; The Brutalist (2024)
- Website: dfwcritics.com

The Dallas–Fort Worth Film Critics Association Award for Best Screenplay is an award presented by the Dallas–Fort Worth Film Critics Association. It was first awarded at the 2005 ceremony and is given in honor of a screenwriter who has delivered an outstanding screenplay while working in the film industry.

== Winners ==
=== 2000s ===
| Year | Winner(s) | Film | Source |
|---|---|---|---|
| 2005 | Larry McMurtry and Diana Ossana | Brokeback Mountain | short story by Annie Proulx |
| 2006 | Michael Arndt | Little Miss Sunshine | |
| 2007 | Diablo Cody | Juno | |
| 2008 | Dustin Lance Black | Milk | |
| 2009 | Jason Reitman and Sheldon Turner | Up in the Air | novel by Walter Kirn |

=== 2010s ===
| Year | Winner(s) | Film | Source |
|---|---|---|---|
| 2010 | Aaron Sorkin | The Social Network | novel by Ben Mezrich |
| 2011 | Alexander Payne, Nat Faxon, and Jim Rash | The Descendants | novel by Kaui Hart Hemmings |
| 2012 | Mark Boal | Zero Dark Thirty | |
| 2013 | John Ridley | 12 Years a Slave | memoir by Solomon Northup |
| 2014 | Alejandro G. Iñárritu, Nicolás Giacobone, Alexander Dinelaris Jr., and Armando Bó | Birdman | |
| 2015 | Tom McCarthy and Josh Singer | Spotlight | |
| 2016 | Kenneth Lonergan | Manchester by the Sea | |
| 2017 | Greta Gerwig | Lady Bird | |
| 2018 | Deborah Davis and Tony McNamara | The Favourite | |
| 2019 | Noah Baumbach | Marriage Story | |

=== 2020s ===
| Year | Winner | Film | Source |
|---|---|---|---|
| 2020 | Emerald Fennell | Promising Young Woman | |
| 2021 | Jane Campion | The Power of the Dog | novel by Thomas Savage |
| 2022 | Martin McDonagh | The Banshees of Inisherin | |
| 2023 | David Hemingson | The Holdovers | |
| 2024 | Brady Corbet and Mona Fastvold | The Brutalist | |
