= Dallas–Fort Worth Film Critics Association Award for Best Director =

Annual US film award

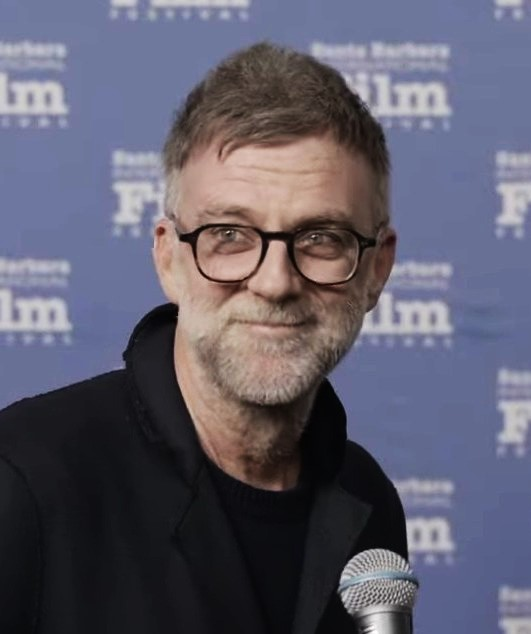
- The 2025 recipient: Paul Thomas Anderson
- Awarded for: Best Achievement in Directing
- Country: United States
- Presented by: Dallas–Fort Worth Film Critics Association
- First award: Kevin Costner; Dances with Wolves (1990)
- Currently held by: Paul Thomas Anderson; One Battle After Another (2024)
- Website: dfwcritics.com

The Dallas–Fort Worth Film Critics Association Award for Best Director is an award presented by the Dallas–Fort Worth Film Critics Association. It is given in honor of a film director who has delivered an outstanding directing while working in the film industry.

== Winners ==
- † = Winner of the Academy Award for Best Director

=== 1990s ===
Year	Winner	Film
1990	Kevin Costner †	Dances with Wolves
1991	Oliver Stone	JFK
1992	Clint Eastwood †	Unforgiven
1993	Steven Spielberg †	Schindler's List
1994	Quentin Tarantino	Pulp Fiction
1995	Mike Figgis	Leaving Las Vegas
1996	Joel Coen	Fargo
1997	James Cameron †	Titanic
1998	Steven Spielberg †	Saving Private Ryan
1999	Sam Mendes †	American Beauty

=== 2000s ===
Year	Winner(s)	Film
2000	Steven Soderbergh †	Traffic
2001	Ron Howard †	A Beautiful Mind
2002	Peter Jackson	The Lord of the Rings: The Two Towers
2003	Peter Jackson	The Lord of the Rings: The Return of the King †
2004	Martin Scorsese	The Aviator
2005	Ang Lee †	Brokeback Mountain
2006	Martin Scorsese †	The Departed
2007	Joel Coen and Ethan Coen †	No Country for Old Men
2008	Danny Boyle †	Slumdog Millionaire
2009	Jason Reitman	Up in the Air

=== 2010s ===
Year	Winner	Film
2010	David Fincher	The Social Network
2011	Alexander Payne	The Descendants
2012	Kathryn Bigelow	Zero Dark Thirty
2013	Alfonso Cuarón †	Gravity
2014	Alejandro G. Iñárritu	Birdman †
2015	Alejandro G. Iñárritu	The Revenant †
2016	Barry Jenkins	Moonlight
2017	Guillermo del Toro †	The Shape of Water
2018	Alfonso Cuarón †	Roma
2019	Sam Mendes	1917

=== 2020s ===
Year	Winner(s)	Film
2020	Chloé Zhao †	Nomadland
2021	Jane Campion †	The Power of the Dog
2022	Daniel Kwan and Daniel Scheinert †	Everything Everywhere All at Once
2023	Christopher Nolan †	Oppenheimer
2024	Sean Baker †	Anora
2025	Paul Thomas Anderson	One Battle After Another
