= Dallas–Fort Worth Film Critics Association Award for Best Film =

Annual US film award

- Country: United States
- Presented by: Dallas–Fort Worth Film Critics Association
- First award: Dances with Wolves (1990)
- Currently held by: Anora (2024)
- Website: dfwcritics.com

The Dallas–Fort Worth Film Critics Association Award for Best Film is an award given by the Dallas–Fort Worth Film Critics Association to honor the best achievements in filmmaking.

== Winners ==
- † = Winner of the Academy Award for Best Picture
- ‡ = Nominated for the Academy Award for Best Picture

=== 1990s ===
Year	Winner	Director
1990	Dances with Wolves †	Kevin Costner
1991	JFK ‡	Oliver Stone
1992	Unforgiven †	Clint Eastwood
1993	Schindler's List †	Steven Spielberg
1994	Pulp Fiction ‡	Quentin Tarantino
1995	Leaving Las Vegas	Mike Figgis
1996	Fargo ‡	Joel Coen
1997	L.A. Confidential ‡	Curtis Hanson
1998	Saving Private Ryan ‡	Steven Spielberg
1999	American Beauty †	Sam Mendes

=== 2000s ===
Year	Winner	Director(s)
2000	Traffic ‡	Steven Soderbergh
2001	A Beautiful Mind †	Ron Howard
2002	Chicago †	Rob Marshall
2003	The Lord of the Rings: The Return of the King †	Peter Jackson
2004	Million Dollar Baby †	Clint Eastwood
2005	Brokeback Mountain ‡	Ang Lee
2006	United 93	Paul Greengrass
2007	No Country for Old Men †	Joel Coen and Ethan Coen
2008	Slumdog Millionaire †	Danny Boyle
2009	Up in the Air ‡	Jason Reitman

=== 2010s ===
Year	Winner	Director
2010	The Social Network ‡	David Fincher
2011	The Descendants ‡	Alexander Payne
2012	Lincoln ‡	Steven Spielberg
2013	12 Years a Slave †	Steve McQueen
2014	Birdman †	Alejandro G. Iñárritu
2015	Spotlight †	Tom McCarthy
2016	Moonlight †	Barry Jenkins
2017	The Shape of Water †	Guillermo del Toro
2018	A Star Is Born ‡	Bradley Cooper
2019	1917 ‡	Sam Mendes

=== 2020s ===
Year	Winner	Director(s)
2020	Nomadland †	Chloé Zhao
2021	The Power of the Dog ‡	Jane Campion
2022	Everything Everywhere All at Once †	Daniel Kwan and Daniel Scheinert
2023	The Holdovers ‡	Alexander Payne
2024	Anora †	Sean Baker
