= Dallas–Fort Worth Film Critics Association Award for Best Cinematography =

Annual US film award

- Awarded for: Best Achievement in Cinematography
- Country: United States
- Presented by: Dallas–Fort Worth Film Critics Association
- First award: Dean Semler; Dances with Wolves (1990)
- Currently held by: Hoyte van Hoytema; Oppenheimer (2023)
- Website: dfwcritics.com

The Dallas–Fort Worth Film Critics Association Award for Best Cinematography is an award presented by the Dallas–Fort Worth Film Critics Association. It is given in honor of a cinematographer who has delivered an outstanding achievement in film.

== Winners ==
- † = Winner of the Academy Award for Best Cinematography

=== 1990s ===
Year	Winner	Cinematographer
1990	Dances with Wolves †	Dean Semler
1991	JFK †	Robert Richardson
1992	Unforgiven	Jack N. Green
1993	Schindler's List †	Janusz Kamiński
1994	Legends of the Fall † (TIE)	John Toll
1994	The Shawshank Redemption (TIE)	Roger Deakins
1995	Braveheart †	John Toll
1996	The English Patient †	John Seale
1997	Titanic †	Russell Carpenter
1998	Saving Private Ryan †	Janusz Kamiński
1999	Snow Falling on Cedars	Robert Richardson

=== 2000s ===
Year	Winner	Cinematographer
2000	Crouching Tiger, Hidden Dragon (Wo hu cang long) †	Peter Pau
2001	The Lord of the Rings: The Fellowship of the Ring †	Andrew Lesnie
2002	Far from Heaven	Edward Lachman
2003	The Lord of the Rings: The Return of the King	Andrew Lesnie
2004	No information	
2005	Brokeback Mountain	Rodrigo Prieto
2006	Apocalypto	Dean Semler
2007	The Assassination of Jesse James by the Coward Robert Ford	Roger Deakins
2008	The Dark Knight	Wally Pfister
2009	The Lovely Bones	Andrew Lesnie

=== 2010s ===
Year	Winner	Cinematographer(s)
2010	127 Hours	Anthony Dod Mantle and Enrique Chediak
2011	The Tree of Life	Emmanuel Lubezki
2012	Life of Pi †	Claudio Miranda
2013	Gravity †	Emmanuel Lubezki
2014	Birdman or (The Unexpected Virtue of Ignorance) †	Emmanuel Lubezki
2015	The Revenant †	Emmanuel Lubezki
2016	La La Land †	Linus Sandgren
2017	The Shape of Water	Dan Laustsen
2018	Roma †	Alfonso Cuarón
2019	1917 †	Roger Deakins

=== 2020s ===
Year	Winner	Cinematographer
2020	Nomadland	Joshua James Richards
2021	Dune †	Greig Fraser
2022	Avatar: The Way of Water	Russell Carpenter
2023	Oppenheimer	Hoyte van Hoytema

== Multiple wins ==
4 wins

- Emmanuel Lubezki (3 consecutive)

3 wins

- Roger Deakins
- Andrew Lesnie

2 wins

- Russell Carpenter
- Janusz Kamiński
- Robert Richardson
- John Toll (consecutive)
