= Dallas–Fort Worth Film Critics Association =

Organization of journalists from Dallas–Fort Worth-based publications

- Formation: 1990
- Purpose: Film criticism
- Location: Dallas–Fort Worth, Texas
- President: Todd Jorgenson
- Website: www.dfwcritics.com

The Dallas–Fort Worth Film Critics Association (DFWFCA) is an organization of over 20 print, radio/TV and internet journalists from Dallas–Fort Worth-based publications. In December of each year, the DFWFCA meets to vote on their Dallas–Fort Worth Film Critics Association Awards for films released in the same calendar year.

In December 2006, the Miami Herald described the association as "one of the most reliable bellwethers of the Academy Award for Best Picture."

== Members ==
- Todd Jorgenson – President
- Frank Swietek
- Boo Allen
- Preston Barta
- Alex Bentley
- Stephen Becker
- Scott Churchill
- Gary Cogill
- Chris Collins
- David Ferguson
- Laura Hiros
- Susan Kamyab Stephens
- Bryan Kluger
- Kristian Lin
- Peter Martin
- James McDonald
- Matt Mungle
- Alice Reese
- Josh Rodriguez
- Rubin Safaya
- Paul Salfen
- Mark Walters
- Frank Wilkins
- Cynthia A. Jordan
- Joshua Mbonu
- Benjamin Miller

== Award categories ==
- Best Film
- Top 10 Films of the Year
- Best Director
- Best Actor
- Best Actress
- Best Supporting Actor
- Best Supporting Actress
- Best Screenplay
- Best Cinematography
- Best Musical Score
- Best Foreign Language Film
- Best Animated Film
- Best Documentary Film (2002–)
- Russell Smith Award

== Award breakdown ==
(2 awards and more)

- 5 awards:
  - One Battle After Another (2025): Best Picture, Director, Screenplay, Actor and Supporting Actress
  - The Power of the Dog (2021): Best Picture, Director, Screenplay, Actor and Supporting Actor
  - Birdman (2014): Best Picture, Actor, Director, Cinematography, and Screenplay
  - Lincoln (2012): Best Picture, Actor, Supporting Actor, Supporting Actress, and Musical Score
  - The Descendants (2011): Best Picture, Actor, Supporting Actress, Director, and Screenplay
- 4 awards:
  - Oppenheimer (2023): Best Director, Actor, Supporting Actor and Cinematography
  - Moonlight (2016): Best Picture, Director, Supporting Actor, and Russell Smith Award
  - The Revenant (2015): Best Actor, Director, Cinematography, and Musical Score
  - Up in the Air (2009): Best Picture, Director, Actor, and Screenplay
  - Brokeback Mountain (2005): Best Film, Director, Adapted Screenplay and Cinematography
  - Sideways (2004): Best Actor, Supporting Actor, Supporting Actress and Adapted Screenplay
  - Leaving Las Vegas (1995): Best Film, Actor, Actress and Director
  - 1917 (2019): Best Picture, Director, Cinematography, and Musical Score
  - Marriage Story (2019): Best Actor, Actress, Supporting Actress and Screenplay
- 3 awards:
  - Anora (2024): Best Picture, Director and Actress
  - Everything Everywhere All At Once (2022): Best Picture, Director and Supporting Actor
  - Nomadland (2020): Best Picture, Director, and Cinematography
  - Roma (2018): Best Director, Foreign Film, and Cinematography
  - 12 Years a Slave (2013): Best Picture, Screenplay, and Supporting Actress
  - Gravity (2013): Best Director, Cinematography, and Musical Score
  - Zero Dark Thirty (2012): Best Actress, Director, and Screenplay
  - The Social Network (2010): Best Picture, Director, and Screenplay
  - No Country for Old Men (2007): Best Film, Supporting Actor and Director
  - The Lord of the Rings: The Return of the King (2003): Best Film, Director and Cinematography
  - A Beautiful Mind (2001): Best Film, Actor and Director
  - American Beauty (1999): Best Film, Actor and Director
  - Schindler's List (1993): Best Film, Supporting Actor and Director
- 2 awards:
  - Sinners (2025 film) (2025): Best Cinematography and Musical Score
  - Sentimental Value (2025): Best Supporting Actor and Foreign Film
  - Promising Young Woman (2020): Best Actress and Screenplay
  - Mank (2020): Best Supporting Actress and Musical Score
  - La La Land (2016): Best Cinematography and Musical Score
  - Manchester by the Sea (2016): Best Actor and Screenplay
  - Spotlight (2015): Best Picture and Screenplay
  - Boyhood (2014): Best Supporting Actress and Russell Smith Award
  - Dallas Buyers Club (2013): Best Actor and Supporting Actor
  - 127 Hours (2010): Best Actor and Cinematography
  - The Fighter (2010): Best Supporting Actor and Supporting Actress
  - The Dark Knight (2008): Best Cinematography and Supporting Actor
  - Slumdog Millionaire (2008): Best Director and Film
  - Capote (2005): Best Actor and Supporting Actress
  - Million Dollar Baby (2004): Best Film and Actress
  - About Schmidt (2002): Best Actor and Supporting Actress
  - Far from Heaven (2002): Best Actress and Cinematography
  - In the Bedroom (2001): Best Actress and Supporting Actress
  - Crouching Tiger, Hidden Dragon (2000): Best Foreign Film and Cinematography
  - You Can Count on Me (2000): Best Actress and Russell Smith Award
  - Traffic (2000): Best Picture and Director
  - The Wings of the Dove (1997): Best Actress and Supporting Actress

== See also ==
- List of film awards
