= List of accolades received by The Brutalist =

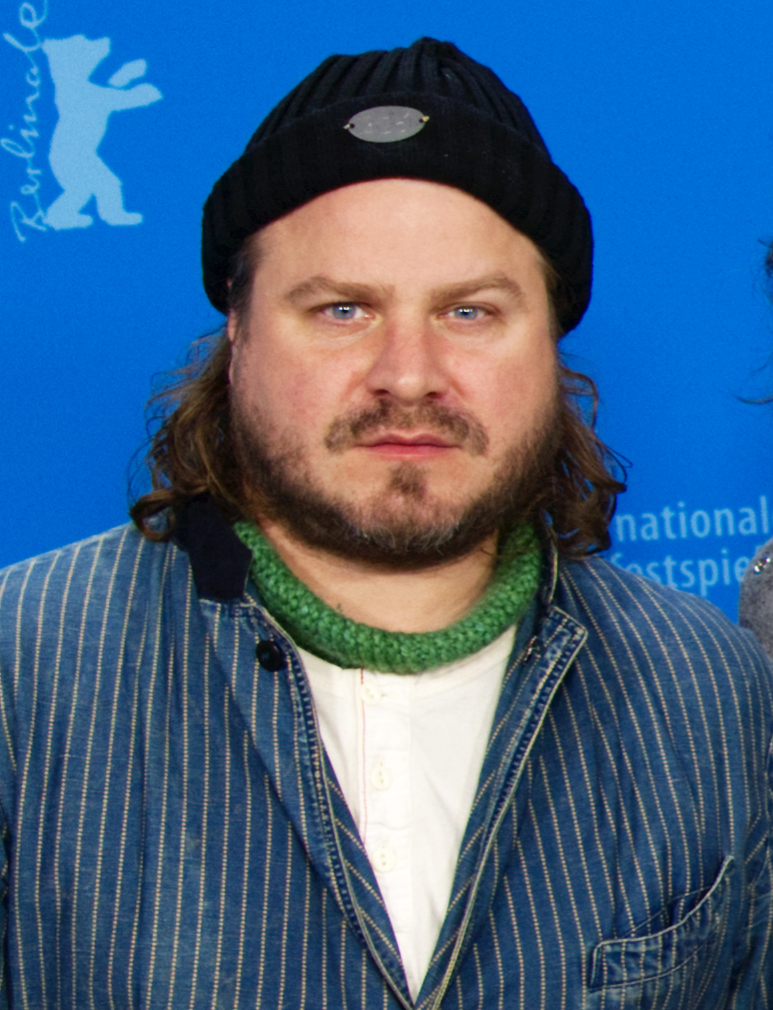
- The film received critical acclaim, with particular praise towards director Brady Corbet and actor Adrien Brody.
Accolades
Award	Wins	Nominations
AACTA International Awards	1	6
AARP Movies for Grownups Awards	1	3
Academy Awards	3	10
Alliance of Women Film Journalists Awards	2	7
American Film Institute Awards	1	1
Astra Film and Creative Arts Awards	0	8
Austin Film Critics Association Awards	2	10
Boston Society of Film Critics Awards	2	2
British Academy Film Awards	4	9
British Society of Cinematographers	1	1
Camerimage	1	2
Capri Hollywood International Film Festival	3	3
Chicago Film Critics Association Awards	3	9
Critics' Choice Awards	1	9
Dallas–Fort Worth Film Critics Association Awards	6	6
Directors Guild of America Awards	0	1
Florida Film Critics Circle Awards	1	5
Georgia Film Critics Association Awards	3	8
Golden Globe Awards	3	7
Gotham Awards	0	2
Independent Spirit Awards	0	1
Kansas City Film Critics Circle Awards	1	2
Los Angeles Film Critics Association Awards	3	3
New York Film Critics Circle Awards	2	2
New York Film Critics Online Awards	7	7
Palm Springs International Film Festival	1	1
San Diego Film Critics Society Awards	1	4
San Francisco Bay Area Film Critics Circle Awards	4	9
Santa Barbara International Film Festival	2	2
Satellite Awards	3	10
Seattle Film Critics Society Awards	1	9
Set Decorators Society of America Awards	0	1
Society of Composers & Lyricists Awards	1	1
St. Louis Film Critics Association Awards	2	9
Toronto Film Critics Association Awards	2	2
Valladolid International Film Festival	0	1
Venice International Film Festival	5	6
Washington D.C. Area Film Critics Association Awards	2	10

Totals (Note: Certain award groups do not simply award one winner. They acknowledge several different recipients, have runners-up, and have third place. Since this is a specific recognition and is different from losing an award, runner-up mentions are considered wins in this award tally. For simplification and to avoid errors, each award in this list has been presumed to have had a prior nomination.)
- Wins: 64
- Nominations: 169

The Brutalist is a 2024 epic period film directed by Brady Corbet, from a screenplay written by Corbet and Mona Fastvold. It follows László Tóth (Adrien Brody), a Hungarian-born Jewish architect who survives the Holocaust and immigrates to the United States, where he struggles to achieve the American Dream until a wealthy client changes his life. Felicity Jones, Guy Pearce, Joe Alwyn, Raffey Cassidy, Stacy Martin, Emma Laird, Isaach de Bankolé, and Alessandro Nivola, also appear in the film.

The Brutalist premiered as a part of the official competition at the 81st Venice International Film Festival, in contention for the Golden Lion. It ultimately received the Silver Lion for Best Direction. It was released by A24 in the United States on December 20, 2024, and is scheduled to be released in the United Kingdom on January 24, 2025, by Universal Pictures and Focus Features. The film was met with critical acclaim. On the review aggregator Rotten Tomatoes, the film achieved an average rating of 8.8/10, with 93% of 167 critics' reviews being positive.

The Brutalist has received multiple awards and nominations through various categories with praise directed to Corbet's direction, screenplay, and performances from its cast, especially of Brody, Pearce, and Jones. Additionally, several awards bodies have also given recognitions to the film's the technical elements, including Daniel Blumberg's score, its cinematography (Lol Crawley), film editing (Dávid Jancsó), and production design (Judy Becker). At the 82nd Golden Globe Awards, the film won awards for Best Motion Picture – Drama, Best Director, and Best Actor in a Motion Picture – Drama; while at the 30th Critics' Choice Awards, it garnered nine nominations, including Best Picture and Best Director. It was also named one of the top 10 films of 2024 by the American Film Institute.

== Accolades ==
Award	Date of ceremony	Category	Recipient(s)	Result	Ref.
AACTA International Awards	February 7, 2025	Best Film	The Brutalist	Nominated	
AACTA International Awards	February 7, 2025	Best Direction	Brady Corbet	Nominated	
AACTA International Awards	February 7, 2025	Best Actor	Adrien Brody	Nominated	
AACTA International Awards	February 7, 2025	Best Supporting Actor	Guy Pearce	Won	
AACTA International Awards	February 7, 2025	Best Supporting Actress	Felicity Jones	Nominated	
AACTA International Awards	February 7, 2025	Best Screenplay	Brady Corbet and Mona Fastvold	Nominated	
AARP Movies for Grownups Awards	January 11, 2025	Best Actor	Adrien Brody	Won	
AARP Movies for Grownups Awards	January 11, 2025	Best Supporting Actor	Guy Pearce	Nominated	
AARP Movies for Grownups Awards	January 11, 2025	Best Time Capsule	The Brutalist	Nominated	
Academy Awards	March 2, 2025	Best Picture	Nick Gordon, Brian Young, Andrew Morrison, D.J. Gugenheim, and Brady Corbet	Nominated	
Academy Awards	March 2, 2025	Best Director	Brady Corbet	Nominated	
Academy Awards	March 2, 2025	Best Actor	Adrien Brody	Won	
Academy Awards	March 2, 2025	Best Supporting Actor	Guy Pearce	Nominated	
Academy Awards	March 2, 2025	Best Supporting Actress	Felicity Jones	Nominated	
Academy Awards	March 2, 2025	Best Original Screenplay	Brady Corbet and Mona Fastvold	Nominated	
Academy Awards	March 2, 2025	Best Original Score	Daniel Blumberg	Won	
Academy Awards	March 2, 2025	Best Cinematography	Lol Crawley	Won	
Academy Awards	March 2, 2025	Best Editing	Dávid Jancsó	Nominated	
Academy Awards	March 2, 2025	Best Production Design	Production Design: Judy Becker; Set Decoration: Patricia Cuccia	Nominated	
Alliance of Women Film Journalists	January 7, 2025	Best Film	The Brutalist	Won	
Alliance of Women Film Journalists	January 7, 2025	Best Director	Brady Corbet	Nominated	
Alliance of Women Film Journalists	January 7, 2025	Best Actor	Adrien Brody	Nominated	
Alliance of Women Film Journalists	January 7, 2025	Best Actor in a Supporting Role	Guy Pearce	Nominated	
Alliance of Women Film Journalists	January 7, 2025	Best Original Screenplay	Brady Corbet and Mona Fastvold	Nominated	
Alliance of Women Film Journalists	January 7, 2025	Best Cinematography	Lol Crawley	Nominated	
Alliance of Women Film Journalists	January 7, 2025	Best Editing	Dávid Jancsó	Won	
American Film Institute Awards	December 5, 2024	Top 10 Films	The Brutalist	Honored	
Astra Film and Creative Awards	December 8, 2024	Best Picture	The Brutalist	Nominated	
Astra Film and Creative Awards	December 8, 2024	Best Director	Brady Corbet	Nominated	
Astra Film and Creative Awards	December 8, 2024	Best Original Screenplay	Brady Corbet and Mona Fastvold	Nominated	
Astra Film and Creative Awards	December 8, 2024	Best Actor	Adrien Brody	Nominated	
Astra Film and Creative Awards	December 8, 2024	Best Supporting Actor	Guy Pearce	Nominated	
Astra Film and Creative Awards	December 8, 2024	Best Cinematography	Lol Crawley	Nominated	
Astra Film and Creative Awards	December 8, 2024	Best Original Score	Daniel Blumberg	Nominated	
Astra Film and Creative Awards	December 8, 2024	Best Production Design	Judy Becker	Nominated	
Austin Film Critics Association	January 6, 2025	Best Film	The Brutalist	Nominated	
Austin Film Critics Association	January 6, 2025	Best Director	Brady Corbet	Nominated	
Austin Film Critics Association	January 6, 2025	Best Actor	Adrien Brody	Nominated	
Austin Film Critics Association	January 6, 2025	Best Supporting Actor	Guy Pearce	Nominated	
Austin Film Critics Association	January 6, 2025	Best Supporting Actress	Felicity Jones	Nominated	
Austin Film Critics Association	January 6, 2025	Best Original Screenplay	Brady Corbet and Mona Fastvold	Nominated	
Austin Film Critics Association	January 6, 2025	Best Cinematography	Lol Crawley	Won	
Austin Film Critics Association	January 6, 2025	Best Film Editing	Dávid Jancsó	Nominated	
Austin Film Critics Association	January 6, 2025	Best Original Score	Daniel Blumberg	Won	
Austin Film Critics Association	January 6, 2025	Best Ensemble	The Brutalist	Nominated	
Boston Society of Film Critics	December 8, 2024	Best Cinematography	Lol Crawley	Won	
Boston Society of Film Critics	December 8, 2024	Best Score	Daniel Blumberg	Won	
British Academy Film Awards	February 16, 2025	Best Film	Nick Gordon, Brian Young, Andrew Morrison, D.J. Gugenheim, and Brady Corbet	Nominated	
British Academy Film Awards	February 16, 2025	Best Director	Brady Corbet	Won	
British Academy Film Awards	February 16, 2025	Best Actor in a Leading Role	Adrien Brody	Won	
British Academy Film Awards	February 16, 2025	Best Actor in a Supporting Role	Guy Pearce	Nominated	
British Academy Film Awards	February 16, 2025	Best Actress in a Supporting Role	Felicity Jones	Nominated	
British Academy Film Awards	February 16, 2025	Best Original Screenplay	Brady Corbet and Mona Fastvold	Nominated	
British Academy Film Awards	February 16, 2025	Best Cinematography	Lol Crawley	Won	
British Academy Film Awards	February 16, 2025	Best Original Score	Daniel Blumberg	Won	
British Academy Film Awards	February 16, 2025	Best Production Design	Judy Becker and Patricia Cuccia	Nominated	
British Society of Cinematographers	February 1, 2025	Best Cinematography in a Feature Film	Lol Crawley	Won	
Camerimage	November 23, 2024	Golden Frog	Lol Crawley	Nominated	
Camerimage	November 23, 2024	Silver Frog	Lol Crawley	Won	
Capri Hollywood International Film Festival	January 2, 2025	Best Actor	Adrien Brody	Won	
Capri Hollywood International Film Festival	January 2, 2025	Best Cinematography	Lol Crawley	Won	
Capri Hollywood International Film Festival	January 2, 2025	Best Original Score	Daniel Blumberg	Won	
Chicago Film Critics Association	December 12, 2024	Best Film	The Brutalist	Won	
Chicago Film Critics Association	December 12, 2024	Best Director	Brady Corbet	Nominated	
Chicago Film Critics Association	December 12, 2024	Best Actor	Adrien Brody	Won	
Chicago Film Critics Association	December 12, 2024	Best Supporting Actor	Guy Pearce	Nominated	
Chicago Film Critics Association	December 12, 2024	Best Original Screenplay	Brady Corbet and Mona Fastvold	Nominated	
Chicago Film Critics Association	December 12, 2024	Best Cinematography	Lol Crawley	Won	
Chicago Film Critics Association	December 12, 2024	Best Original Score	Daniel Blumberg	Nominated	
Chicago Film Critics Association	December 12, 2024	Best Editing	Dávid Jancsó	Nominated	
Chicago Film Critics Association	December 12, 2024	Best Art Direction / Production Design	The Brutalist	Nominated	
Critics' Choice Movie Awards	February 7, 2025	Best Picture	The Brutalist	Nominated	
Critics' Choice Movie Awards	February 7, 2025	Best Director	Brady Corbet	Nominated	
Critics' Choice Movie Awards	February 7, 2025	Best Actor	Adrien Brody	Won	
Critics' Choice Movie Awards	February 7, 2025	Best Supporting Actor	Guy Pearce	Nominated	
Critics' Choice Movie Awards	February 7, 2025	Best Original Screenplay	Brady Corbet and Mona Fastvold	Nominated	
Critics' Choice Movie Awards	February 7, 2025	Best Cinematography	Lol Crawley	Nominated	
Critics' Choice Movie Awards	February 7, 2025	Best Editing	Dávid Janscó	Nominated	
Critics' Choice Movie Awards	February 7, 2025	Best Production Design	Judy Becker and Patricia Cuccia	Nominated	
Critics' Choice Movie Awards	February 7, 2025	Best Score	Daniel Blumberg	Nominated	
Dallas–Fort Worth Film Critics Association	December 18, 2024	Best Picture	The Brutalist	2nd Place	
Dallas–Fort Worth Film Critics Association	December 18, 2024	Best Director	Brady Corbet	2nd Place	
Dallas–Fort Worth Film Critics Association	December 18, 2024	Best Actor	Adrien Brody	2nd Place	
Dallas–Fort Worth Film Critics Association	December 18, 2024	Best Supporting Actor	Guy Pearce	Won	
Dallas–Fort Worth Film Critics Association	December 18, 2024	Best Screenplay	Bradt Corbet and Mona Fastvold	Won	
Dallas–Fort Worth Film Critics Association	December 18, 2024	Best Cinematography	Lol Crawley	2nd Place	
David di Donatello	May 6, 2026	Best International Film	The Brutalist	Nominated	
Directors Guild of America Awards	February 8, 2025	Outstanding Directing – Feature Film	Brady Corbet	Nominated	
Florida Film Critics Circle	December 20, 2024	Best Picture	The Brutalist	Nominated	
Florida Film Critics Circle	December 20, 2024	Best Actor	Adrien Brody	Nominated	
Florida Film Critics Circle	December 20, 2024	Best Cinematography	Lol Crawley	Won	
Florida Film Critics Circle	December 20, 2024	Best Original Score	Daniel Blumberg	Nominated	
Florida Film Critics Circle	December 20, 2024	Best Art Direction / Production Design	The Brutalist	Nominated	
Georgia Film Critics Association	January 7, 2025	Best Picture	The Brutalist	Nominated	
Georgia Film Critics Association	January 7, 2025	Best Director	Brady Corbet	Runner-up	
Georgia Film Critics Association	January 7, 2025	Best Actor	Adrien Brody	Nominated	
Georgia Film Critics Association	January 7, 2025	Best Supporting Actor	Guy Pearce	Runner-up	
Georgia Film Critics Association	January 7, 2025	Best Original Screenplay	Brady Corbet, Mona Fastvold	Runner-up	
Georgia Film Critics Association	January 7, 2025	Best Cinematography	Lol Crawley	Nominated	
Georgia Film Critics Association	January 7, 2025	Best Production Design	Judy Becker, Patricia Cuccia	Nominated	
Georgia Film Critics Association	January 7, 2025	Best Original Score	Daniel Blumberg	Nominated	
Golden Globe Awards	January 5, 2025	Best Motion Picture – Drama	The Brutalist	Won	
Golden Globe Awards	January 5, 2025	Best Actor in a Motion Picture – Drama	Adrien Brody	Won	
Golden Globe Awards	January 5, 2025	Best Supporting Actor – Motion Picture	Guy Pearce	Nominated	
Golden Globe Awards	January 5, 2025	Best Supporting Actress – Motion Picture	Felicity Jones	Nominated	
Golden Globe Awards	January 5, 2025	Best Director	Brady Corbet	Won	
Golden Globe Awards	January 5, 2025	Best Screenplay	Brady Corbet and Mona Fastvold	Nominated	
Golden Globe Awards	January 5, 2025	Best Original Score	Daniel Blumberg	Nominated	
Golden Trailer Awards	May 29, 2025	Best Drama	A24 / Mark Woollen & Associates (for "Build")	Won	
Golden Trailer Awards	May 29, 2025	Most Original Trailer	A24 / Mark Woollen & Associates (for "America")	Nominated	
Gotham Awards	2 December 2024	Outstanding Lead Performance	Adrien Brody	Nominated	
Gotham Awards	2 December 2024	Outstanding Supporting Performance	Guy Pearce	Nominated	
Independent Spirit Awards	February 22, 2025	Best Director	Brady Corbet	Nominated	
Kansas City Film Critics Circle	January 4, 2025	Best Original Screenplay	Brady Corbet, Mona Fastvold	Nominated	
Kansas City Film Critics Circle	January 4, 2025	Best Cinematography	Lol Crawley	Won	
New York Film Critics Circle Awards	December 3, 2024	Best Film	The Brutalist	Won	
New York Film Critics Circle Awards	December 3, 2024	Best Actor	Adrien Brody	Won	
Los Angeles Film Critics Association	December 8, 2024	Best Film	The Brutalist	Runner-up	
Los Angeles Film Critics Association	December 8, 2024	Best Cinematography	Lol Crawley	Runner-up	
Los Angeles Film Critics Association	December 8, 2024	Best Production Design	Judy Becker	Won	
New York Film Critics Online	December 16, 2024	Best Picture	The Brutalist	Runner-up	
New York Film Critics Online	December 16, 2024	Best Director	Brady Corbet	Runner-up	
New York Film Critics Online	December 16, 2024	Best Actor	Adrien Brody	Won	
New York Film Critics Online	December 16, 2024	Best Supporting Actor	Guy Pearce	Won	
New York Film Critics Online	December 16, 2024	Best Screenplay	Brady Corbet and Mona Fastvold	Won	
New York Film Critics Online	December 16, 2024	Best Cinematography	Lol Crawley	Won	
New York Film Critics Online	December 16, 2024	Best Use of Music	The Brutalist	Won	
Palm Springs International Film Festival	January 3, 2025	Desert Palm Achievement Award for Best Actor	Adrien Brody	Won	
Robert Awards	January 31, 2026	Best English Language Film	Brady Corbet	Nominated	
San Diego Film Critics Society	December 9, 2024	Best Director	Brady Corbet	Nominated	
San Diego Film Critics Society	December 9, 2024	Best Actor	Adrien Brody	Runner-up	
San Diego Film Critics Society	December 9, 2024	Best Supporting Actor	Guy Pearce	Nominated	
San Diego Film Critics Society	December 9, 2024	Best Production Design	Judy Becker	Nominated	
San Francisco Bay Area Film Critics Circle	December 15, 2024	Best Film	The Brutalist	Nominated	
San Francisco Bay Area Film Critics Circle	December 15, 2024	Best Director	Brady Corbet	Won	
San Francisco Bay Area Film Critics Circle	December 15, 2024	Best Actor	Adrien Brody	Nominated	
San Francisco Bay Area Film Critics Circle	December 15, 2024	Best Supporting Actor	Guy Pearce	Nominated	
San Francisco Bay Area Film Critics Circle	December 15, 2024	Best Original Screenplay	Brady Corbet and Mona Fastvold	Nominated	
San Francisco Bay Area Film Critics Circle	December 15, 2024	Best Cinematography	Lol Crawley	Won	
San Francisco Bay Area Film Critics Circle	December 15, 2024	Best Editing	Dávid Jancsó	Nominated	
San Francisco Bay Area Film Critics Circle	December 15, 2024	Best Original Score	Daniel Blumberg	Won	
San Francisco Bay Area Film Critics Circle	December 15, 2024	Best Production Design	Judy Becker	Won	
Santa Barbara International Film Festival	February 15, 2025	Cinema Vanguard Award	Adrien Brody	Won	
Santa Barbara International Film Festival	February 15, 2025	Cinema Vanguard Award	Guy Pearce	Won	
Satellite Awards	January 26, 2025	Best Motion Picture – Drama	The Brutalist	Won	
Satellite Awards	January 26, 2025	Best Director	Brady Corbet	Won	
Satellite Awards	January 26, 2025	Best Actor in a Motion Picture – Drama	Adrien Brody	Nominated	
Satellite Awards	January 26, 2025	Best Supporting Actor	Guy Pearce	Won	
Satellite Awards	January 26, 2025	Best Supporting Actress	Felicity Jones	Nominated	
Satellite Awards	January 26, 2025	Best Original Screenplay	Brady Corbet and Mona Fastvold	Nominated	
Satellite Awards	January 26, 2025	Best Cinematography	Lol Crawley	Nominated	
Satellite Awards	January 26, 2025	Best Editing	Dávid Jancsó	Nominated	
Satellite Awards	January 26, 2025	Best Production Design	Judy Becker, Patricia Cuccia and Mercédesz Nagyváradi	Nominated	
Satellite Awards	January 26, 2025	Best Original Score	Daniel Blumberg	Nominated	
Screen Actors Guild Awards	February 23, 2025	Outstanding Performance by a Male Actor in a Leading Role	Adrien Brody	Nominated	
Seattle Film Critics Society	December 16, 2024	Best Picture	The Brutalist	Nominated	
Seattle Film Critics Society	December 16, 2024	Best Director	Brady Corbet	Nominated	
Seattle Film Critics Society	December 16, 2024	Best Lead Actor	Adrien Brody	Nominated	
Seattle Film Critics Society	December 16, 2024	Best Supporting Actor	Guy Pearce	Nominated	
Seattle Film Critics Society	December 16, 2024	Best Screenplay	Brady Corbet and Mona Fastvold	Nominated	
Seattle Film Critics Society	December 16, 2024	Best Cinematography	Lol Crawley	Nominated	
Seattle Film Critics Society	December 16, 2024	Best Film Editing	Dávid Jancsó	Nominated	
Seattle Film Critics Society	December 16, 2024	Best Original Score	Daniel Blumberg	Nominated	
Seattle Film Critics Society	December 16, 2024	Best Production Design	Judy Becker	Won	
Set Decorators Society of America	February 2, 2025	Best Achievement in Décor/Design of a Period Feature Film	Patricia Cuccia, Mercédesz Nagyváradi, Judy Becker	Nominated	
Society of Composers & Lyricists	February 12, 2025	Outstanding Original Score for an Independent Film	Daniel Blumberg	Won	
St. Louis Film Critics Association	December 15, 2024	Best Film	The Brutalist	Nominated	
St. Louis Film Critics Association	December 15, 2024	Best Director	Brady Corbet	Nominated	
St. Louis Film Critics Association	December 15, 2024	Best Actor	Adrien Brody	Runner-up	
St. Louis Film Critics Association	December 15, 2024	Best Supporting Actor	Guy Pearce	Nominated	
St. Louis Film Critics Association	December 15, 2024	Best Original Screenplay	Brady Corbet and Mona Fastvold	Nominated	
St. Louis Film Critics Association	December 15, 2024	Best Cinematography	Lol Crawley	Nominated	
St. Louis Film Critics Association	December 15, 2024	Best Editing	Dávid Jancsó	Nominated	
St. Louis Film Critics Association	December 15, 2024	Best Production Design	Judy Becker	Nominated	
St. Louis Film Critics Association	December 15, 2024	Best Score	Daniel Blumberg	Won	
Toronto Film Critics Association	December 15, 2024	Best Film	The Brutalist	Runner-up	
Toronto Film Critics Association	December 15, 2024	Best Lead Performance	Adrien Brody	Runner-up	
Valladolid International Film Festival	October 26, 2024	Golden Spike	The Brutalist	Nominated	
Venice International Film Festival	September 7, 2024	Golden Lion	Brady Corbet	Nominated	
Venice International Film Festival	September 7, 2024	Silver Lion	Brady Corbet	Won	
Venice International Film Festival	September 7, 2024	ARCA CinemaGiovani Award for Best Film of Venezia 81	Brady Corbet	Won	
Venice International Film Festival	September 7, 2024	Premio CinemaSarà	Brady Corbet	Won	
Venice International Film Festival	September 7, 2024	FIPRESCI Award for Best Film from Venezia 81	Brady Corbet	Won	
Venice International Film Festival	September 7, 2024	UNIMED Award for Cultural Diversity	Brady Corbet	Won	
Washington D.C. Area Film Critics Association	December 8, 2024	Best Film	The Brutalist	Nominated	
Washington D.C. Area Film Critics Association	December 8, 2024	Best Director	Brady Corbet	Won	
Washington D.C. Area Film Critics Association	December 8, 2024	Best Actor	Adrien Brody	Nominated	
Washington D.C. Area Film Critics Association	December 8, 2024	Best Supporting Actor	Guy Pearce	Nominated	
Washington D.C. Area Film Critics Association	December 8, 2024	Best Original Screenplay	Brady Corbet and Mona Fastvold	Nominated	
Washington D.C. Area Film Critics Association	December 8, 2024	Best Cinematography	Lol Crawley	Nominated	
Washington D.C. Area Film Critics Association	December 8, 2024	Best Editing	Dávid Jancsó	Nominated	
Washington D.C. Area Film Critics Association	December 8, 2024	Best Original Score	Daniel Blumberg	Won	
Washington D.C. Area Film Critics Association	December 8, 2024	Best Production Design	Judy Becker	Nominated	
Washington D.C. Area Film Critics Association	December 8, 2024	Best Acting Ensemble	The Brutalist	Nominated	
