= The Childhood of a Leader =

The Childhood of a Leader may refer to:

- "The Childhood of a Leader" (novella), a 1939 short story/novella by Jean-Paul Sartre
- The Childhood of a Leader (film), a 2016 historical drama film by Brady Corbet with music by Scott Walker
- The Childhood of a Leader (soundtrack)
