= The Brutalist =

2024 film by Brady Corbet

- Theatrical release poster
- Directed by: Brady Corbet
- Written by: Brady Corbet; Mona Fastvold
- Produced by: Trevor Matthews; Nick Gordon; Brian Young; Andrew Morrison; Andrew Lauren; D.J. Gugenheim; Brady Corbet
- Starring: Adrien Brody; Felicity Jones; Guy Pearce; Joe Alwyn; Raffey Cassidy; Stacy Martin; Emma Laird; Isaach de Bankolé; Alessandro Nivola
- Cinematography: Lol Crawley
- Edited by: Dávid Jancsó
- Music by: Daniel Blumberg
- Production companies: Brookstreet Pictures; Kaplan Morrison
- Distributed by: A24; (United States); UIP-DunaFilm (Hungary); Universal Pictures; Focus Features (Select Territories)
- Release dates: September 1, 2024 (Venice); December 20, 2024 (United States); January 24, 2025 (United Kingdom)
- Running time: 215 minutes
- Countries: United States; Canada; Hungary; United Kingdom
- Language: English
- Budget: $9.6 million (net)
- Box office: $50.4 million

The Brutalist is a 2024 epic period drama film directed and produced by Brady Corbet, who co-wrote the screenplay with Mona Fastvold. It stars Adrien Brody as a Jewish-Hungarian architect and severely traumatized Holocaust survivor who emigrates to the United States, where he struggles to recover and get his life back on track. The cast also features Felicity Jones, Guy Pearce, Joe Alwyn, Raffey Cassidy, Stacy Martin, Emma Laird, Isaach de Bankolé, and Alessandro Nivola. The film was shot using the VistaVision format which had been originally developed in the 1950s, and was the first film shot in the format since One-Eyed Jacks in 1961.

A co-production of the United States, the United Kingdom, and Hungary, The Brutalist premiered at the 81st Venice International Film Festival on September 1, 2024, where Corbet was awarded the Silver Lion for Best Direction. It was released in the United States by A24 on December 20, 2024; in Hungary by UIP-DunaFilm on January 23, 2025; and in the United Kingdom and Latin America by Focus Features through Universal Pictures International on January 24, 2025.

The film received critical acclaim and grossed $50.4 million against a $9.6 million budget. Among multiple accolades, the film earned ten nominations at the 97th Academy Awards, including Best Picture, winning for Best Cinematography, Best Original Score, and Best Actor for Brody. At the 82nd Golden Globe Awards, it won three awards, including Best Motion Picture – Drama. It was named one of the top ten films of 2024 by the American Film Institute.

== Plot ==
=== Overture ===
Hungarian-Jewish Holocaust survivor and Bauhaus-trained architect László Tóth arrives in the United States after being forcibly separated from his wife, Erzsébet, and orphaned niece, Zsófia. As his ship enters New York Harbor, he sees the Statue of Liberty.

=== Part 1: The Enigma of Arrival ===
In 1947, László travels to Philadelphia and stays with his cousin, Attila. He discovers that Attila has assimilated, anglicizing his name and converting to Catholicism. Attila reveals to a relieved László that Erzsébet and Zsófia are still alive but stuck in Europe. He offers László work with his furniture business, and the two are soon approached by Harry Lee Van Buren, who wishes to surprise his father, wealthy industrialist Harrison Lee Van Buren, with a renovated library at his mansion near Doylestown, Pennsylvania. Following a drunken night of merriment where Attila and his wife Audrey both encourage László to dance with her, Audrey expresses her disdain for László and suggests he live elsewhere. Back at the mansion, Harrison is enraged by the surprise renovation and fires the men; Harry refuses to pay them. Attila blames László for the failed project, falsely accuses him of having made a pass at Audrey, and demands that he leave their home.

Three years later, László, now a heroin addict, works as a laborer loading coal and lives in charity housing with his friend Gordon, an African-American single father. Harrison turns up to tell him the architectural community has lauded his modern library renovation, and that he has discovered László's past as an accomplished architect in Europe. He pays the money owed and invites László to a party, where he commissions a grand project in tribute to his late mother: The Van Buren Institute, a community center comprising a library, theater, gymnasium, and chapel. Work begins immediately with László living on site and employing Gordon. Harrison introduces László to his personal lawyer, who expedites the immigration of László's wife and niece.

=== Part 2: The Hard Core of Beauty ===
In 1953, Erzsébet and Zsófia reunite with László in Philadelphia and he discovers that as a result of their wartime suffering, Erzsébet is a full-time wheelchair user due to osteoporosis, and Zsófia is unable to speak. During construction, László clashes with contractors and consultants hired by Harrison, who depart from his design in an attempt to stay on budget. He agrees to work unpaid to make up for additional costs. Harry derides László as being merely "tolerated" and makes lewd remarks about Zsófia. Following the derailment of a train carrying materials and ensuing legal costs, a furious Harrison abandons the project and fires the workers.

In 1958, László and Erzsébet have moved to New York City, where he works as a draftsman at an architecture firm, and she writes for a newspaper. Zsófia, having recovered her ability to speak, is expecting a child with her husband, Binyamin. They announce they are making Aliyah and moving to Jerusalem, much to the chagrin of László and Erzsébet. Harrison restarts the project and rehires László.

While visiting Carrara to purchase marble, Harrison rapes an intoxicated László, calling him a societal leech whose people invite their own persecution. László begins to unravel, becoming more belligerent and impulsively firing Gordon during an argument back on site. Recalling the prior contempt he received, he laments to Erzsébet that they are not welcome in America. After László almost kills Erzsébet by giving her heroin to soothe her pain, she proposes they move to Jerusalem and live with Zsófia, to which he agrees. Shortly afterwards, Erzsébet confronts Harrison at his home and calls him a rapist in front of his family and associates. An enraged Harry violently drags her out, before his sister Maggie intervenes and helps her leave. Unable to find his father, Harry organizes a search party and tries to locate him within the institute.

=== Epilogue: The First Architecture Biennale ===
In 1980, Erzsébet has died, and a retrospective of László's work is held at the first Venice Biennale of Architecture. The exhibition showcases various projects built around the world in the ensuing years and includes the Van Buren Institute, finally completed in 1973. Zsófia, accompanied by her young adult daughter and an aging, incapacitated László in a wheelchair, gives a revelatory speech asserting that László designed spaces in the structure to resemble both Buchenwald and Dachau concentration camps. The structure, she implies, functions as a way of processing trauma. Zsófia ends her speech with a phrase she claims László used to tell her as a struggling young mother: "No matter what the others try and sell you, it is the destination, not the journey."

== Cast ==
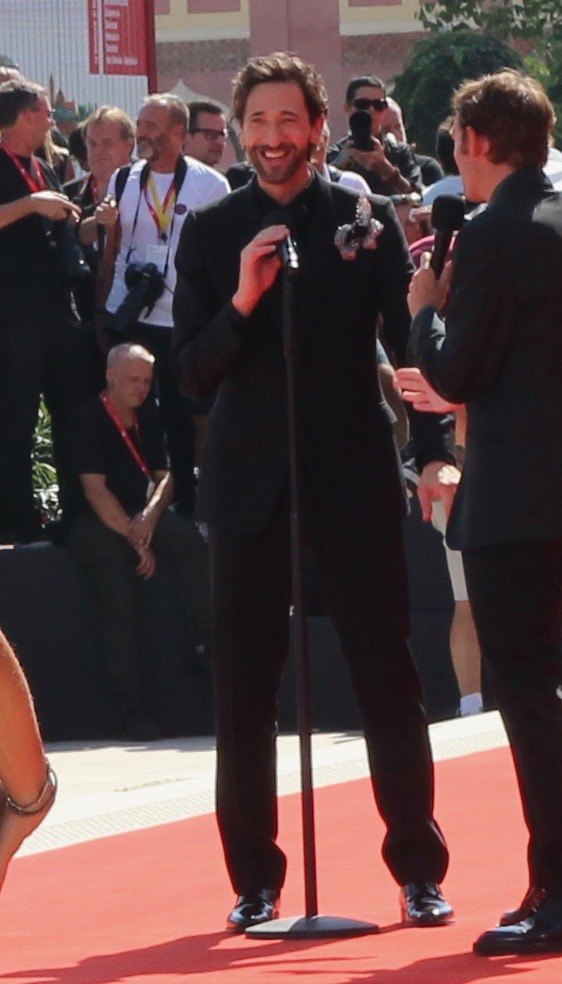
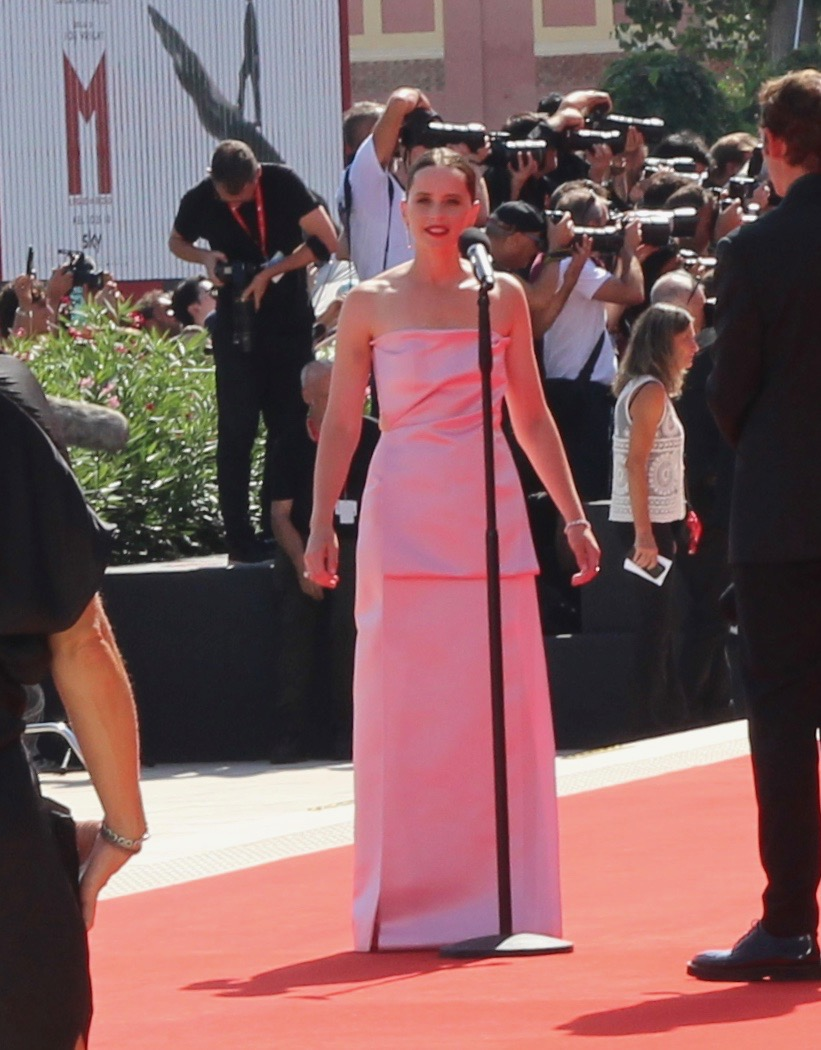
Adrien Brody and Felicity Jones attending the premiere of the film at the 2024 Venice Film Festival
- Adrien Brody as László Tóth, a Hungarian-Jewish architect and Holocaust survivor of the Buchenwald concentration camp who immigrates to the United States
- Felicity Jones as Erzsébet Tóth, László's wife, a journalist and Holocaust survivor of the Dachau concentration camp
- Guy Pearce as Harrison Lee Van Buren, a wealthy, handsome, snobbish industrialist who becomes László's primary client, but is envious of his artistic creativity
- Joe Alwyn as Harry Lee Van Buren, Harrison's entitled and pompous son
- Raffey Cassidy as Zsófia, László's orphaned teenage niece, who has become mute after surviving the Holocaust, also at Dachau
  - Cassidy also briefly as Zsófia's young adult daughter
  - Ariane Labed as adult Zsófia
- Stacy Martin as Maggie Van Buren, Harry's kinder twin sister
- Alessandro Nivola as Attila Miller, a furniture store owner in Philadelphia and László's cousin, who immigrated to America before the war and is more assimilated into the culture
- Emma Laird as Audrey Miller, Attila's Catholic wife originally from Connecticut
- Isaach de Bankolé as Gordon, László's friend, a single father
- Michael Epp as Jim Simpson, a mundane architect
- Jonathan Hyde as Leslie Woodrow, a builder hired by Harrison to realize László's design
- Peter Polycarpou as Michael Hoffman, Harrison's Jewish attorney
- Maria Sand as Michelle Hoffman, Michael's wife, a converted Jew
- Salvatore Sansone as Orazio, László's friend in Carrara, an Italian anarchist who fought against Mussolini

== Production ==
=== Development ===
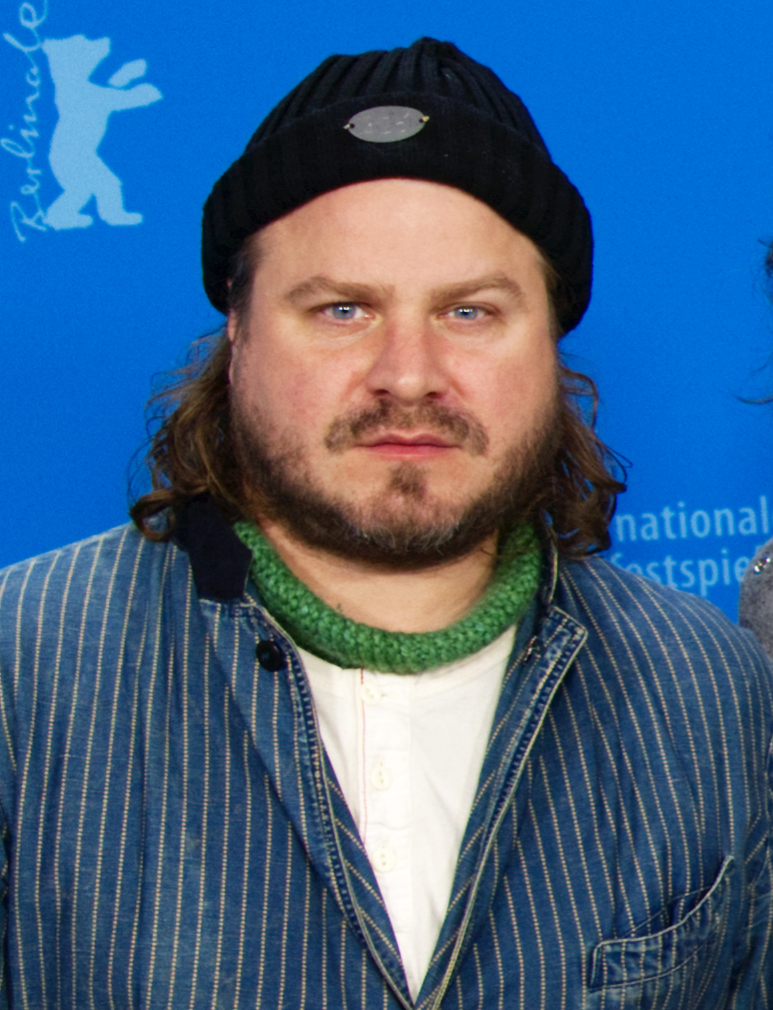
Writer/Director Brady Corbet in 2024

In September 2018, Deadline reported that director Brady Corbet had chosen the period drama The Brutalist as his next project following the world premiere of his second feature film, Vox Lux (2018). New York-based Andrew Lauren Productions (ALP) developed the screenplay with Corbet and financed the film. Corbet co-wrote the screenplay with his partner Mona Fastvold, with whom he co-wrote the psychological drama The Childhood of a Leader (2015) and the musical film Vox Lux (2018).

The film was originally announced as a co-production between Andrew Lauren and D.J. Gugenheim for ALP and Brian Young for Three Six Zero and later joined by Trevor Matthews and Nick Gordon for Brookstreet Pictures, Andrew Morrison of Yellow Bear, the Polish company Madants, and executive produced by Christine Vachon, Pamela Koffler, and David Hinojosa of Killer Films.

On September 2, 2020, Deadline announced that Joel Edgerton and Marion Cotillard had been cast as the film's leads, László Tóth and Erzsébet Tóth, respectively, and that Mark Rylance was cast in the role of László's mysterious client. Sebastian Stan, Vanessa Kirby, Isaach De Bankolé, Alessandro Nivola, Raffey Cassidy, and Stacy Martin were also announced in unknown roles. Corbet described The Brutalist as "a film which celebrates the triumphs of the most daring and accomplished visionaries; our ancestors", and the project which is so far the closest to his heart and family history. Protagonist Pictures presented the project to buyers at the 2020 Toronto International Film Festival. The film takes place in Pennsylvania and was shot in four languages: English, Hebrew, Hungarian, and Italian.

Director of photography Lol Crawley, editor Dávid Jancsó, and costume designer Kate Forbes were announced on March 9, 2023. Production designer Judy Becker was announced on April 11, 2023. Daniel Blumberg composed the film's score.

On April 11, 2023, it was announced that Adrien Brody, Felicity Jones, Guy Pearce, Joe Alwyn, Jonathan Hyde, Emma Laird, and Peter Polycarpou would star in the film, while Edgerton, Cotillard, Rylance, Stan, and Kirby were no longer attached. It was also announced that the film would be co-produced by the US-based companies Andrew Lauren Productions and Yellow Bear along with the United Kingdom's Brookstreet and Intake Films, and Hungary's Proton Cinema, and financed by Brookstreet UK, Yellow Bear, Lip Sync Productions, Richmond Pictures, Meyohas Studio, Carte Blanche, Cofiloisirs, and Parable Media. CAA Media Finance handles US sales with Protagonist Pictures handling international sales. Focus Features subsequently acquired international distribution rights to the film.

Corbet dedicated the film to Scott Walker, who had died in 2019, and who had scored his previous films.

=== Writing ===
Corbet had long had an interest in architecture. His uncle is an architect who studied at Taliesin West, which Corbet frequented as a child, while Fastvold's grandfather was a mid-century designer. Corbet stated that the film is about the parallels between the artistic experience and the immigrant experience, and that brutalism, in addition to its highly cinematic nature, would work as the perfect visual allegory for exploring post-war trauma. Fastvold's own experience as an immigrant from Norway also informed the writing of the film. Furthermore, Corbet considered architecture and filmmaking to be similar processes, as they are both "forms of artistic expression that require an extraordinary amount of participation from other people, collaboration and lots of money".

The character of László Tóth was inspired by several real-life architects and designers, including Marcel Breuer, Paul Rudolph, Ludwig Mies van der Rohe, László Moholy-Nagy, Louis Kahn, and Ernő Goldfinger. During their research, Corbet and Fastvold consulted architectural historian Jean-Louis Cohen (who died in 2023); Cohen noted that no actual examples of architects that emerged from the war with a career like Tóth's in fact existed. Alongside Cohen's Architecture in Uniform: Designing and Building for the Second World War, Hilary Thimmesh's Marcel Breuer and a Committee of Twelve Plan a Church: A Monastic Memoir, a book chronicling the construction of Saint John's Abbey in Collegeville, Minnesota by the Hungary-born, Bauhaus-trained Breuer, was an additional point of reference. Corbet further cited the writings of W. G. Sebald and V. S. Naipaul (whose novel The Enigma of Arrival lends its name to the first part of the film) as influences.

=== Filming ===
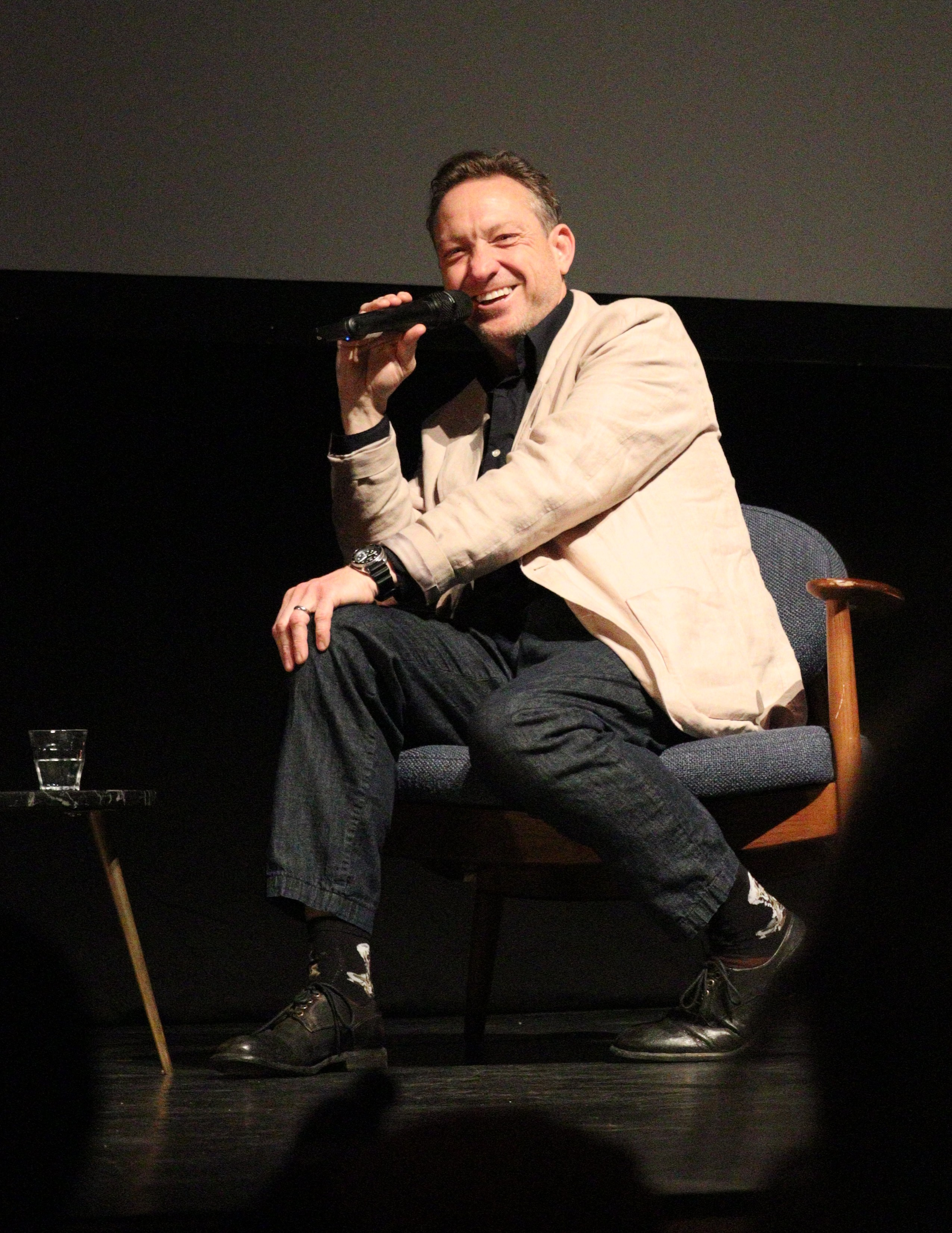
Cinematographer Lol Crawley discussing The Brutalist at the 2025 IFFR

Corbet shot the film's epilogue in Venice in September 2020. Principal photography, scheduled to start in Poland in December, was postponed due to COVID restrictions. Further delays occurred as a result of the war in Ukraine as well as several pregnancies (including that of lead actress Felicity Jones) and deaths in the families of the film's cast and crew. Corbet ultimately elected to shoot in Hungary to take advantage of its tax credits, the presence of multiple film laboratories in Budapest, as well as his own familiarity; both Corbet and Fastvold had prior experience filming in the country.

Principal photography eventually began on March 16, 2023, in Budapest. The Hungarian capital and surrounding countryside doubled as 1950s Philadelphia and rural Pennsylvania in the film, while the Andrássy Castle in Tóalmás stood in for the Van Buren mansion. Production then moved to Carrara, Tuscany, on April 29, 2023. Filming took place in the Bettogli and Bombarda quarries in unexpected thick fog, and in the town of Carrara itself. A small camera unit filmed exteriors in New York City, as well as the Statue of Liberty reveal featured in the opening scene. Principal photography wrapped after 34 days on May 5, 2023.

The film was shot using the VistaVision process and cameras equipped with Leica-S lenses. It involves shooting horizontally on 35 mm film stock, which was then scanned, with the intention of also making prints for a 70 mm release, which has the same height and was the most practical format to show the original size of the VistaVision frame when projecting film. The idea for VistaVision arose while Corbet and director of photography Lol Crawley were scouting the quarries in Italy. The format was originally intended for big vistas, but ultimately the vast majority of the film was shot on VistaVision. Corbet explained that "the best way to access [the 1950s] was to shoot on something that was engineered in that same decade", while Crawley stated that the format, with its wider field of view, allowed filmmakers to photograph architecture without using distorting wide-angle lenses. Crawley also used Arricam ST, LT and Arriflex 235 35 mm cameras equipped with Cooke lenses for the shoot. An Arriflex 416 16 mm camera equipped with Zeiss Superspeed lenses was used to shoot documentary-style footage, while the TV footage in the epilogue was filmed using a Digital Betacam.

The Van Buren Institute, which was only constructed in portions and as a scale model, was designed by production designer Judy Becker based on the notes of Fastvold and Corbet, who tried to be as descriptive as they could about its features in the script. Not an architect by training, Becker looked to the designs of concentration camps, real-life brutalist buildings, the work of Marcel Breuer and Tadao Ando, Louis Kahn's Salk Institute, Frank Lloyd Wright's Johnson Wax Headquarters and James Turrell's skyspaces for inspiration. She also cited Breuer's Westchester Reform Temple in Scarsdale, New York, a synagogue she remembered from her childhood and which had a Star of David overhead, as a point of reference.

=== Music ===
The film's score was composed by English musician Daniel Blumberg, who had previously worked with Corbet on the short film Gyuto (2019). The two worked together on the film over a span of seven years. The album containing the score was released through Milan Records on December 13, 2024. Blumberg and Corbet wanted continuous music for the film's first 10 minutes, resulting in the opening sequence of The Brutalist being choreographed and shot to Blumberg's demos. The overture features pianists John Tilbury, Sophie Agnel, and Simon Sieger, trumpeter Axel Dörner, and saxophonist Evan Parker, all of whom appear throughout the soundtrack. Synth-pop musician Vince Clarke plays the synthesizer on "Epilogue (Venice)".

The experimental "Construction" was the first track Blumberg wrote for the score; an early demo was composed on a prepared piano at London's Cafe Oto to create a sound similar to construction noises. "Erzsébet", one of the score's themes, was played by Blumberg live on a piano since Corbet wanted the actors to hear the music while shooting; the train noises from the scene were eventually incorporated into the track's final version.

=== Post-production and A.I. controversy ===
Editing was completed by Hungarian editor Dávid Jancsó. In an interview with RedShark News, Jancsó revealed that artificial intelligence (A.I.) tools from Respeecher, a Ukrainian software company, were deployed in order to improve the authenticity of Adrien Brody and Felicity Jones's Hungarian dialogue. Both actors received dialect coaching, but had troubles with Hungarian phonemes since the language is known to be particularly difficult to learn for native English-speakers. The filmmakers wanted to perfect their pronunciation "so that not even locals will spot any difference." Unsuccessful ADR work prompted them to record Brody and Jones's voices into Respeecher; Jancsó, a native Hungarian speaker, also fed in his voice to "finesse the tricky dialect".

Director Brady Corbet issued the following statement to Deadline Hollywood after Jancsó's interview sparked backlash on social media:

[Brody] and [Jones]'s performances are completely their own. They worked for months with dialect coach Tanera Marshall to perfect their accents. Innovative Respeecher technology was used in Hungarian language dialogue editing only, specifically to refine certain vowels and letters for accuracy. No English language was changed. This was a manual process, done by our sound team and Respeecher in post-production. The aim was to preserve the authenticity of [Brody] and [Jones]'s performances in another language, not to replace or alter them and done with the utmost respect for the craft.

Before settling on AI as a tool, production considered using auto-tune on ADR, a popular technique in Hollywood. Dávid Jancsó affirms:

There's nothing in the film using AI that hasn't been done before. It just makes the process a lot faster.

Additionally, it was said that generative artificial intelligence was used to conjure a series of architectural blueprints and finished buildings in the film's closing sequence. In a 2022 Filmmaker article, production designer Judy Becker claimed the film's architecture consultant used Midjourney "to create three brutalist buildings quite quickly." However, Corbet denied this in a subsequent interview: "Judy Becker and her team did not use AI to create or render any of the buildings. All images were hand-drawn by artists. To clarify, in the memorial video featured in the background of a shot, our editorial team created pictures intentionally designed to look like poor digital renderings circa 1980." The director concluded by saying "The Brutalist is a film about human complexity, and every aspect of its creation was driven by human effort, creativity, and collaboration. We are incredibly proud of our team and what they've accomplished here."

== Release ==
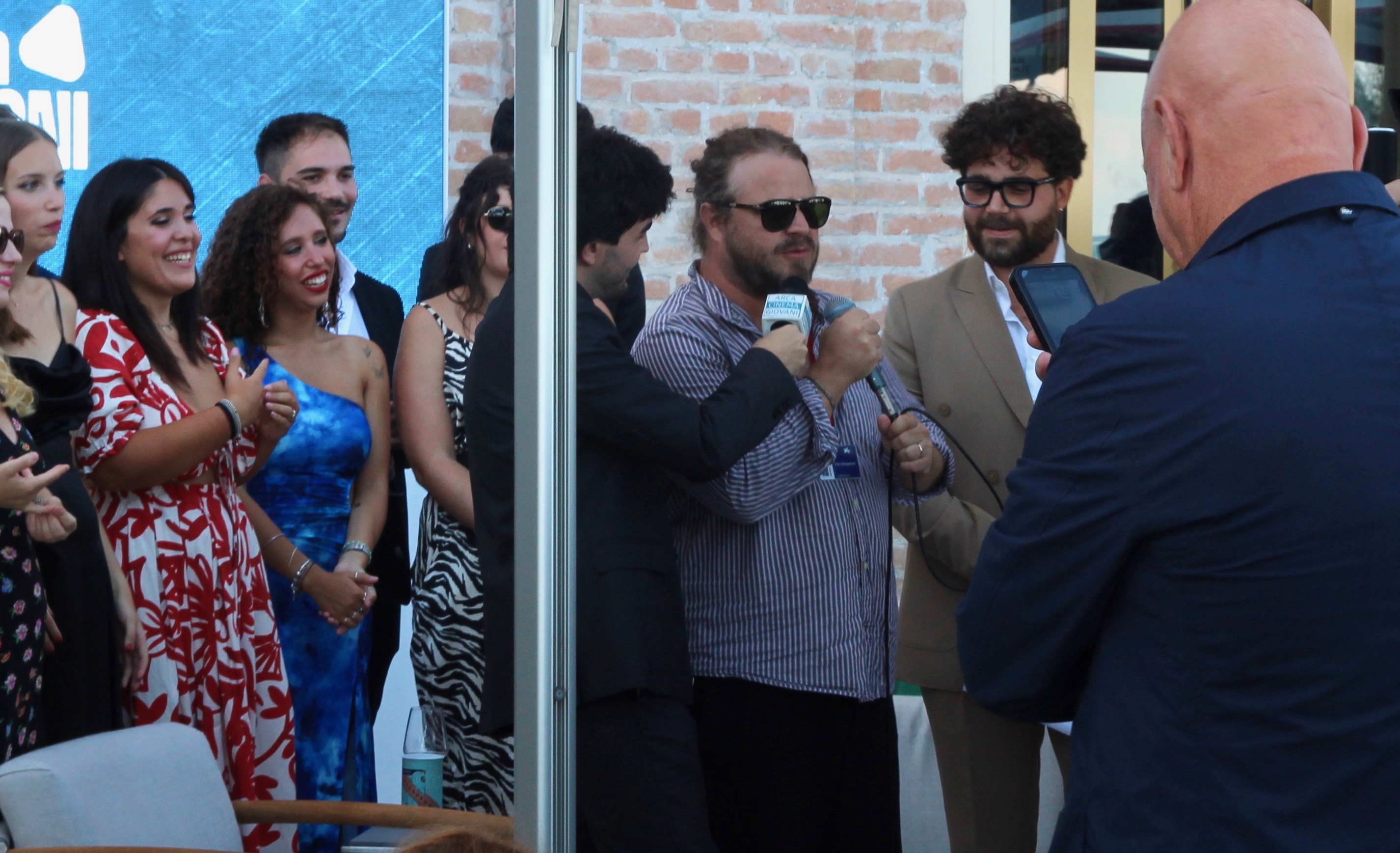
Director Brady Corbet receiving the ARCA Cinema Giovani Award at the 2024 Venice Film Festival

The Brutalist had its world premiere at the 81st Venice International Film Festival on September 1, 2024, where it competed for the Golden Lion and won the Silver Lion for Corbet. It also played at the Toronto International Film Festival on September 6, 2024. The film's festival run also included selections for screenings at the 2024 New York Film Festival, the 69th Valladolid International Film Festival, and the 31st Austin Film Festival. It was featured in the Limelight section of the 54th International Film Festival Rotterdam to be screened in February 2025.

A week after its premiere at Venice, A24 acquired U.S. distribution rights to the film for $10–15 million in what was described as a competitive situation. One distributor that bid for the film was Neon, although the company's CEO Tom Quinn said that he and Corbet disagreed on whether to delay the film's release to 2025 in order to produce more 70mm prints. It was released in the U.S. by A24 on December 20, 2024, and was released in the United Kingdom and Latin America by Focus Features through Universal Pictures International on January 24, 2025. In Canada, it was distributed by Elevation Pictures. It was screened in IMAX theaters two days prior to its limited theatrical release for New York and Los Angeles before being screened in IMAX nationwide throughout January.

== Reception ==
=== Box office ===
The Brutalist grossed $16.3 million in the United States and Canada, and $34.1 million in other territories, for a worldwide total of $50.4 million.

The Brutalist made $266,791 from four theaters in the US in its opening weekend, and then $211,164 in its second weekend and $244,341 in its third. In its fourth weekend, the film expanded to 68 theaters and made $1.38 million. Its figure was noted as outperforming Better Man, which made $1.1 million from 1,291 theaters over the same frame. The following weekend it grossed $2 million from 338 theaters (and a total of $2.4 million over the four-day MLK holiday). After earning 10 Oscar nominations, the film expanded to 1,118 theaters, and made $2.9 million over the weekend.

=== Critical response ===
On the review aggregator website Rotten Tomatoes, 93% of 337 critics' reviews are positive. The website's consensus reads: "Structurally beautiful and suffused with Adrien Brody's soulful performance, writer-director Brady Corbet's immaculately designed The Brutalist is a towering tribute to the immigrant experience." Metacritic, which uses a weighted average, assigned the film a score of 90 out of 100, based on 57 critics, indicating "universal acclaim".

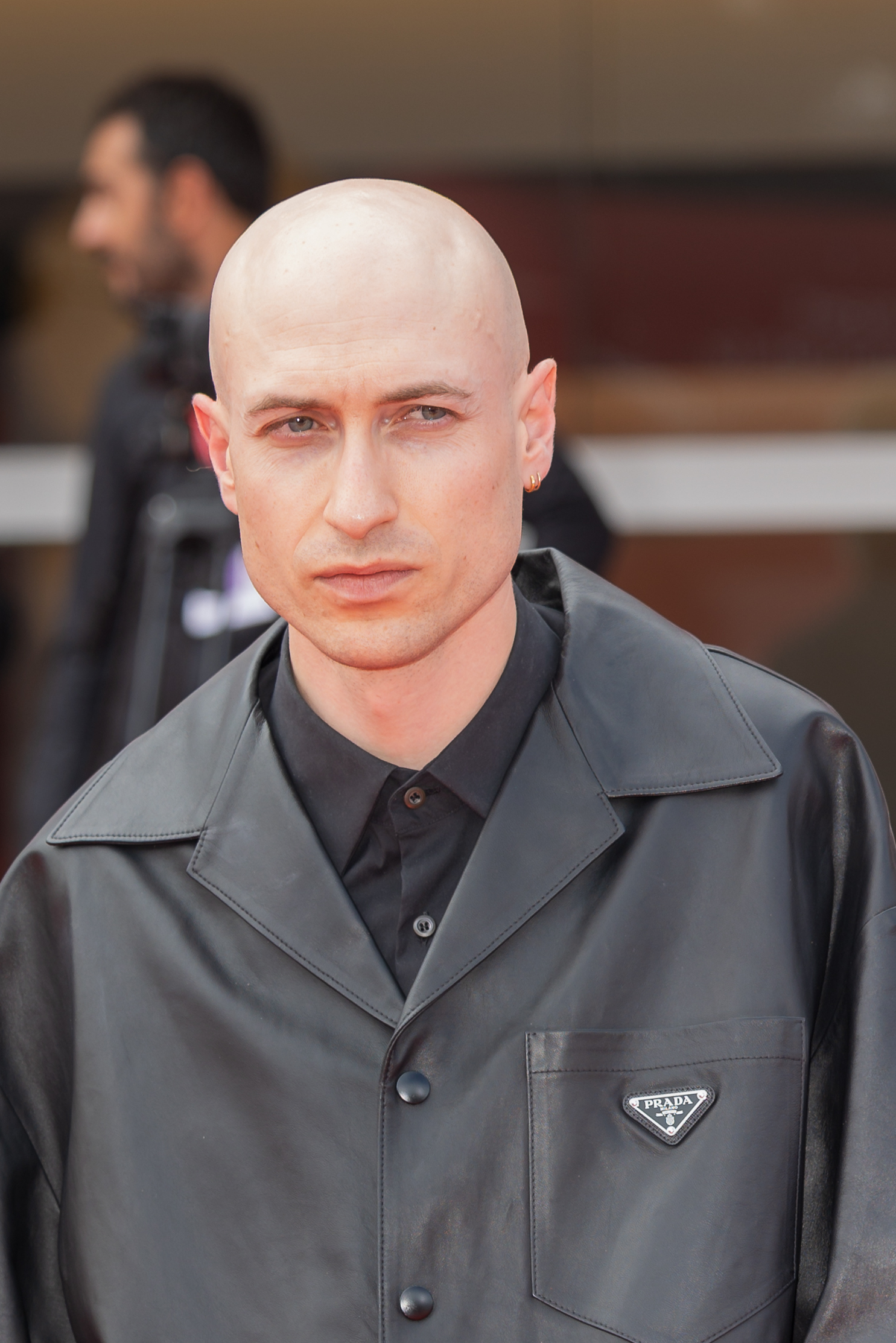
Adrien Brody won his second Academy Award for Best Actor for his performance, while Daniel Blumberg won the Academy Award for Best Original Score.

The Guardian's Peter Bradshaw gave the film five out of five stars, calling it "an amazing and engrossing epic". He continued: "The Brutalist obviously takes something from Ayn Rand, but also from Bernard Malamud and Saul Bellow in its depiction of the US immigrant adventure and the promise of success – but maybe Corbet and Fastvold go further and faster into how dizzyingly sensual and sexual it all is". Bradshaw concluded: "It is an electrifying piece of work, stunningly shot by cinematographer Lol Crawley and superbly designed by Judy Becker. I emerged from this movie light-headed and euphoric, dizzy with rubbernecking at its monumental vastness." Owen Gleiberman of Variety wrote that the film is "paced with a pleasing stateliness" despite its long runtime, and "overflows with incident and emotion (...) as if Corbet were making a biopic about a real person." He favorably compared Brody's work in The Brutalist to the actor's Academy Award-winning prior role as a Holocaust survivor in The Pianist (2002), writing that "his performance, even at its quietest, is suffused with tumultuous feeling." He also highly praised Pearce's performance, writing, "Pearce is often a riveting character actor, but it's been a long time since he popped in a role the way he does here. In thick wavy hair and a mustache, speaking with a booming stentorian bluster that's plummy and irresistible, he's like Clark Gable playing Charles Foster Kane."

Brian Tallerico of RogerEbert.com gave The Brutalist four out of four stars, describing it as "a film that turns inward into itself, winding its themes around its characters like a great American novel." He called Brody's performance "the best work of his career" and felt Pearce "balances him perfectly" in his portrayal of "a wealthy monster who discards anyone around him once he's used them up," while finding Jones "a bit miscast". He also called the film "a technical marvel" and praised its cinematography, editing, and score. David Sims of The Atlantic interpreted the film as Corbet's "grand canvas to explore his own frustrations with the limits that commerce places on the arts", positively comparing it to the director's previous feature, Vox Lux (2018). He wrote: "Vox Lux was a film that had me crying out 'I get it!' in frustration; with The Brutalist, I said the same line with more satisfaction." Sims called Brody's performance "pained and lived-in" and Pearce's "an excellent performance of a preening cartoon character". Though, he described the second half of the film as "something of a slog" and "unrelenting in its despair", but felt it "plays both better and worse on a second viewing, because the blatant contours of the plot are less jarring."

The New Yorker's Richard Brody was more critical of the film, writing, "Brady Corbet's epic takes on weighty themes, but fails to infuse its characters with the stuff of life."

The film's use of VistaVision led to a revival of industry interest in the format, with Paul Thomas Anderson using it to film his 2025 film One Battle After Another, as well as Yorgos Lanthimos's Bugonia (2025), Alejandro González Iñárritu's Digger (2026), Greta Gerwig's Narnia: The Magician's Nephew, and M. Night Shyamalan's Remain (both 2027).

=== Accolades ===
Upon its premiere at the 81st Venice International Film Festival, The Brutalist won five awards, including the Silver Lion. It was subsequently nominated for nine awards at the 30th Critics' Choice Awards, ten awards at the 97th Academy Awards including Best Picture. It ultimately won three of these, which were Best Cinematography, Best Score, and Best Actor. It had seven nominations at the 82nd Golden Globe Awards, winning three for Best Actor in a Motion Picture – Drama, Best Director and Best Motion Picture – Drama. In addition, the American Film Institute named The Brutalist as one of the top 10 films of 2024.

NPR included the film in their list of the best movies and TV of 2024, with critic Bob Mondello writing that The Brutalist is: "Gorgeous, conceptually stunning, and dizzying in its savagery about cracks in the foundation of the American dream."

RogerEbert.com writers named The Brutalist to the top slot of the site's Ten Best Films of 2024, which is determined by Borda count of the site's writers.

Filmmakers Tim Fehlbaum, Drew Goddard, Reinaldo Marcus Green, Don Hertzfeldt, Matt Johnson, Karyn Kusama, David Lowery, Lance Oppenheim, Paul Schrader, Celine Song, Oliver Stone, Denis Villeneuve, Malcolm Washington, John Waters and Shea Whigham have cited it as among their favorite films of 2024.

In December 2024, The Brutalist topped Collider's list of the "10 Best Drama Movies of the Last 25 Years", with Liam Gaughan writing: "Brady Corbet crafted a deeply thought-provoking story about the collapse of the American dream, the inescapable greed of capitalism, and the aggressive anti-Semitism that is still pertinent today ... The Brutalist is an unforgettable film, and serves as a reminder that true innovations within the industry are still possible."

In January 2025, Coachella Valley Independent named it "One of the Best Films of the 21st Century", with Bob Grimm writing: "You'll realize you are seeing genius and historic filmmaking in progress — a sprawling, majestic, 3 1/2-hour epic in which every frame is well-played."

Vulture also included it on its list of "The Best Movies Over 3 Hours Long", calling it: "A film as colossal as the building at its heart."

In April 2025, Urban List included it on its list of "14 of The Best Cinematography Movies Ever Made".

In June 2025, IndieWire ranked the film at number 76 on its list of "The 100 Best Movies of the 2020s (So Far)."

In July 2025, it was one of the films voted for the "Readers' Choice" edition of The New York Times' list of "The 100 Best Movies of the 21st Century," finishing at number 241.
