= D.J. Gugenheim =

American film and television producer

- Born: New York, U.S.
- Education: University of California, Los Angeles
- Occupations: Film and television producer and entrepreneur
- Years active: 2002–present

D.J. Gugenheim is an American film and television producer and entrepreneur. He was nominated for an Academy Award in the category Best Picture for the film The Brutalist.

== Early life and education ==
Gugenheim spent parts of his youth in New York, Israel, and Florida. At the age of sixteen, he moved independently to Los Angeles, California and studied theater and business at the University of California, Los Angeles, where he received the Gilbert Cates Award for producing a multimedia stage adaptation of Fahrenheit 451. He also studied International Relations at the Hebrew University of Jerusalem.

== Career ==
After graduation, Gugenheim worked in Washington, D.C., including at the Woodrow Wilson Center and on Capitol Hill. He later returned to Los Angeles and collaborated with director Joel Zwick on the film Fat Albert, He then held roles at major entertainment firms including CAA and Paramount Vantage, contributing during production periods of the films There Will Be Blood and No Country for Old Men. He also took part in development at Captivate Entertainment (a Universal-based venture) on projects including the film The Bourne Legacy.

Gugenheim joined Lotus Entertainment as VP of production and soon was promoted to executive VP of production, where he executive produced the films Kidnap (2017), November Criminals (2017) and The Crucifixion (2017). In April 2015, Andrew Lauren Productions appointed him president of production, where he oversaw production and development on several projects, including the English-language debut from the film Claire Denis starring Robert Pattinson and Juliette Binoche, as well as ventures with José Padilha, Sam Esmail, Taylor Sheridan, and Anne Hathaway.

At Andrew Lauren Productions, he produced the films High Life (2018) and Vox Lux (2018). He later worked with Brady Corbet again and produced the film The Brutalist (2024), released by A24, which won the Golden Globe for Best Motion Picture – Drama, earned four BAFTA Awards, and was nominated for ten Oscars, including Best Picture, where Gugenheim was one of the credited producers. He also received the Producers Guild of America Mark on the film.

In recent years, Gugenheim has collaborated with Billy Porter under a first-look deal with FX Productions. He served as executive producer on the documentaries A Tree of Life: The Pittsburgh Synagogue Shooting (2022), released on HBO Max, and I Was Born This Way (2025), a film about Carl Bean. Gugenheim is also a producer, alongside Porter, on a biographical film about author James Baldwin for Byron Allen's Allen Media Group.

Outside of film and television, Gugenheim has been involved in the pet wellness industry as President of Lillie & Lee. Under his leadership, the company transitioned from Asher House Wellness to Lillie & Lee, expanding its focus on pet wellness products, digital media, and brand development. In 2026, content initiatives developed under his supervision at the company received four Telly Awards in categories related to storytelling, creative direction, and brand innovation. Industry publications have noted the company's significant social media presence and growth within the pet wellness sector.

== Personal life ==
Gugenheim is the son of Paul Rafael Gugenheim, a survivor of World War II who was among the children rescued through the Kindertransport program. He is also a direct descendant of Rabbi Samson Raphael Hirsch, a German Orthodox rabbi and philosopher.

== Selected filmography ==
=== As producer ===
Year	Title	Notes
2024	The Brutalist	Credited producer; Golden Globe winner; BAFTA winner; Oscar nominee (Best Picture); received Producers Guild of America Mark
2018	Vox Lux	Producer
2018	High Life	Producer
2022	Anything’s Possible	Producer; directorial debut of Billy Porter

=== As executive producer ===
Year	Title	Notes
2017	Kidnap	Executive producer
2017	November Criminals	Executive producer
2017	The Crucifixion	Executive producer
2026	Time Warp	Executive producer

== Awards and recognition ==
=== The Brutalist – Major awards and nominations ===
Year	Award	Category	Recipient / Work	Result
2025	Golden Globe Awards	Best Motion Picture – Drama	The Brutalist	Won
2025	Golden Globe Awards	Best Director	Brady Corbet / The Brutalist	Won
2025	Golden Globe Awards	Best Actor – Drama	Adrien Brody / The Brutalist	Won
2025	Golden Globe Awards	Best Supporting Actress	Felicity Jones / The Brutalist	Nominated
2025	Golden Globe Awards	Best Supporting Actor	Guy Pearce / The Brutalist	Nominated
2025	Golden Globe Awards	Best Screenplay	Brady Corbet & Mona Fastvold / The Brutalist	Nominated
2025	Golden Globe Awards	Best Original Score	Daniel Blumberg / The Brutalist	Nominated
2025	Academy Awards	Best Picture	The Brutalist	Nominated
2025	Academy Awards	Best Director	Brady Corbet / The Brutalist	Nominated
2025	Academy Awards	Best Actor	Adrien Brody / The Brutalist	Won
2025	Academy Awards	Best Original Score	Daniel Blumberg / The Brutalist	Won
2025	Academy Awards	Best Cinematography	Lol Crawley / The Brutalist	Won
2025	BAFTA Film Awards	Best Director	Brady Corbet / The Brutalist	Won
2025	BAFTA Film Awards	Best Actor	Adrien Brody / The Brutalist	Won
2025	BAFTA Film Awards	Best Cinematography	Lol Crawley / The Brutalist	Won
2025	BAFTA Film Awards	Best Original Score	Daniel Blumberg / The Brutalist	Won
2024	Venice Film Festival	Silver Lion	Brady Corbet / The Brutalist	Won

Gugenheim was named one of Variety's "Up-and-Coming Dealmakers" in 2014, featured in the Dealmakers Impact Report for his work in the film industry, including his positions at Lotus Entertainment and Andrew Lauren Productions.
