= Enjoy (2021 film) =

- Directed by: Saul Abraham
- Written by: Callum Cameron
- Produced by: Gabriele Lo Giudice, Nick Rowell
- Starring: Himesh Patel, Tom Sweet
- Edited by: Saul Abraham
- Release date: 2021
- Running time: 19 minutes
- Country: United Kingdom

Enjoy is a 2021 British short film directed by Saul Abraham. The film explores male mental health following a home tutor who is struggling to navigate his job and his depression. Enjoy was filmed in the United Kingdom and has been presented in a number of festivals, including the Raindance Film Festival, Aspen Shortsfest 2022 and Tribeca Film Festival where it premiered in 2021.

== Plot ==
Michael (Himesh Patel) battles with his spiralling depression, which impacts his romantic relationship and his job as a home tutor to the struggling pre-teen Archibald (Tom Sweet).

== Reception ==
Since its launch, the film has been selected in various festivals around the world:

Year	Festivals	Award/Category	Status
2021	Tribeca Film Festival	Short Film Jury Award: International Fiction	Nominated
2021	The British Short Film Awards	Best British Short Film	Won
2021	The British Short Film Awards	Best Supporting Actor (Tom Sweet)	Won
2021	Raindance Film Festival	Best UK Short Film	Won
2021	HollyShorts Film Festival	Grand Jury Award	Nominated
2021	Flicker's Rhode Island International Film Festival	Best Actor (Himesh Patel)	Won
2022	Bend Film Festival	Best Narrative Short Film	Won
2022	Aspen Shortsfest	Youth Jury Prize	Won
