= Treasure Island (2026 TV series) =

British television series

- Genre: Action-adventure; Historical drama
- Created by: Robert Murphy
- Based on: Treasure Island by Robert Louis Stevenson
- Written by: Robert Murphy
- Directed by: Jeremy Lovering; William McGregor; Paul Norton Walker
- Starring: David Oyelowo; Tom Sweet; Tomer Capone; Craige Els; Neil Pendleton; George Frost; Mayen Mehta; Tadhg Murphy; Tristan Sturrock; Adam James; Jack Huston; Hayley Atwell; Alexandre Blazy; Billie Boullet; Alexandra Naoum; Ashley Zhangazha; Tomiwa Edun; Lee Boardman
- Composer: Alex Baranowski
- Countries of origin: United Kingdom; United States
- Original language: English
- No. of series: 1
- No. of episodes: 6

Production
- Executive producers: David Stern; Scott Huff; Colin Callender; Robert Murphy; Jeremy Lovering; Silvia Aráez; Daniel Gratton; Sebastian Cardwell; Paul Tesar
- Producer: Mark Hedges
- Cinematography: Xavier Dolléans; William Baldy; Maroš Žilinčan; Sam Heasman
- Editors: Melanie Viner-Cuneo; Jerry Ramsbottom; Robin Hill; William Blunden; Oral Ottey
- Production company: Playground Entertainment

Original release
- Network: MGM+ (United States)
- Release: 11 October – 15 November 2026
- Network: Paramount+ (United Kingdom)
- Release: 12 October – 16 November 2026

Treasure Island is an action-adventure television series adaptation of the novel of the same name by Robert Louis Stevenson. The series stars David Oyelowo, Tom Sweet, Jack Huston, and Hayley Atwell. Produced by Playground Entertainment in association with Paramount+, the series is an American-British co-production.

Treasure Island consists of six episodes, and premiered on MGM+ in the United States on 11 October 2026 and on Paramount+ in the United Kingdom and Ireland the following day.

== Premise ==
Jim Hawkins and his mother come into possession of an old treasure map and search for the location of treasure, as a British agent and an experienced pirate do likewise.

== Cast and characters ==
=== Main ===
- David Oyelowo as Long John Silver
- Tom Sweet as Jim Hawkins
- Tomer Capone as Billy Bones
- Craige Els as Mr. Arrow
- Neil Pendleton as Mr. Cameron
- George Frost as Meg Monahan
- Mayen Mehta as Mr. Khan
- Tadhg Murphy as Mr. Baker
- Tristan Sturrock as Captain Smollett
- Adam James as Squire Livesey
- Jack Huston as Aaron Graham
- Hayley Atwell as Bess Hawkins
- Alexandre Blazy as Olivier Descalles
- Billie Boullet as Amelie Descalles
- Alexandra Naoum as Heloise Descalles
- Ashley Zhangazha as Makandal
- Tomiwa Edun as Charles
- Lee Boardman as Ben Gunn

=== Supporting ===
- Martin Frislev Ammitsbøl as Constable Gow
- Joe Blackmore as Nathan Makeson
- César Martel as Captain Flint
- Hamish Skeoch as Eddie
- Christopher Langan as Mousey
- Michael Culkin as Lord Gray
- James Pedley-Holden as Lieutenant Appleby
- Ilan Evans as Henri Vasseur
- Javier Cáberiz as Ignatius
- Laura Ubach as Immaculata
- Winslow Iwaki as Blind Pew
- Timothy Jay Polley as Black Dog

== Episodes ==
No.	Title	Directed by	Written by	Original US release date	Original UK release date
1	"Chapter 1: The Admiral Benbow"	Jeremy Lovering	Robert Murphy	11 October 2026	12 October 2026
2	"Chapter 2: Great Britain"	William McGregor	Robert Murphy	18 October 2026	19 October 2026
3	"Chapter 3: The Wide Eternal Sea"	William McGregor	Robert Murphy	25 October 2026	26 October 2026
4	"Chapter 4: San Domingue"	Jeremy Lovering	Robert Murphy	1 November 2026	2 November 2026
5	"Chapter 5: Skeleton Island"	Paul Norton Walker	Robert Murphy	8 November 2026	9 November 2026
6	"Chapter 6: A Princesa De Aveiro"	Paul Norton Walker	Robert Murphy	15 November 2026	16 November 2026

== Production ==
=== Development ===
The six-part series was commissioned by MGM+ in the United States and Paramount+ in the United Kingdom. It is produced by Playground Entertainment, for whom David Stern, Scott Huff, Colin Callender and Daniel Gratton are executive producers alongside show creator Robert Murphy, and Jeremy Lovering, with Lovering as lead director alongside William McGregor and Paul Walker. Mark Hedges is series producer.

=== Casting ===
The cast is led by David Oyelowo, Hayley Atwell and Jack Huston with Tomer Capone, as well as Craige Els, Tristan Sturrock and Neil Pendleton, with Tom Sweet as Jim Hawkins.

=== Filming ===
Filming began in March 2026, with some production services in Spain provided by Ánima Stillking. First-look images from filming were released to the media in September 2026, a month prior to broadcast.

== Release ==
The series premiered on MGM+ on 11 October 2026 in the United States, and on Paramount+ in the UK and Ireland the following day, with episodes being released weekly through 15 and 16 November, respectively.
