= The Wall (Sartre short story collection) =

1939 collection of 5 short stories by Jean-Paul Sartre

- Author: Jean-Paul Sartre
- Language: French
- Genre: Short story
- Published: 1939
- Publication place: France

The Wall (French: Le Mur) by Jean-Paul Sartre is a collection of 5 short stories published in 1939. It contains four stories that had been published in various French journals, as well as the title story, "The Wall".

"The Wall" is considered one of the author's greatest existentialist works of fiction. Sartre dedicated the book to his companion Olga Kosakiewicz, a former student of Simone de Beauvoir.

== "The Wall" ==
The eponymous story coldly depicts a situation in which prisoners are condemned to death. Written in 1939, the story is set in the Spanish Civil War, which began July 18, 1936, and ended April 1, 1939, when the Nationalists (known in Spanish as the Nacionalistas), led by General Francisco Franco, overcame the forces of the Spanish Republic and entered Madrid.

The title refers to the wall used by firing squads to execute prisoners. The Wall itself symbolises the inevitability and unknowing of one's death. The protagonist, Pablo Ibbieta, along with two others in his cell, is sentenced to death. He is offered a way out if he reveals the location of his comrade, Ramón Gris. Pablo begins thinking to himself and finds that he no longer cares about his cause or his life. Pablo continues to refuse to cooperate until just before his scheduled execution, when, seeing no harm in it, he gives the authorities what he believes to be false information on Ramón Gris' whereabouts. But Ramón Gris has moved from his previous hiding place to the very spot where Pablo tells the authorities he may be found. Thus Ramón Gris is shot and Pablo's life is, at least temporarily, spared from death.

== "The Room" ==
In La Chambre ("The Room"), Mme Darbédat is confined to her room by an unknown illness, where she spends her bedridden days reminiscing and eating rahat-loukoums. She receives weekly visits from her husband, M. Darbédat; that day, during their conversation, it is revealed that the Darbédats' daughter, Ève, refuses to allow her husband Pierre – who suffers from apparent insanity – to be put away into an asylum. Mme Darbédat hints at Ève and Pierre's continued romantic intimacy, further angering her husband. M. Darbédat decides to pay Ève a visit, and the narrative shifts from the “sane” world of the Darbédats into the “sick,” perverse world of Pierre. After witnessing some of Pierre’s eccentric, abnormal behavior, M. Darbédat, unable to convince Ève to send the "madman" to Dr Franchot's clinic, finally leaves the apartment in helpless frustration. In the second part of the story, the nature of Pierre’s bizarre psychosis is explored more fully: he remains locked in a room that he has painted in black, calls his wife “Agatha” and recounts delusions about a time spent with her in Hamburg, and keeps a talisman (which he calls a “ziuthre”) to deal with his hallucinations. Nevertheless, Ève wishes to understand and engage in Pierre's psychotic world, which she finds authentic (in so doing, Ève has cut herself off from "normal" society). Ève watches as Pierre hallucinates a group of flying, buzzing statues, after which he goes to sleep. As she watches him sleep, Ève wonders how soon it will be before he shows signs of degeneration, bestialization, and utter dementia; the story ends with her chilling resolution to the sleeping Pierre: “Je te tuerai avant” (I’ll kill you before that.)

== "Erostratus" ==
A story about a misanthropic man who resolves to follow the path of Herostratus and make history by means of an evil deed—in this case, by killing six random people (one for each bullet in his revolver). The man is exhilarated by the sense of power he receives when carrying his revolver on the streets within his pocket. "But I no longer drew assurance from that [the revolver], it was from myself: I was a being like a revolver, a torpedo or a bomb." Sartre gives the reader an insightful account about how a man's nature changes with the objects of his possession, but the object itself is unable to change the internal man, as seen in the conclusion.

== "Intimacy" ==
Young Lulu struggles with authenticity as she seeks to liberate herself from social stereotypes. She decides to leave her husband Henri and run off with her lover Pierre at the insistence of her friend Rirette. She goes through several stages of realisation as she sees that the roles of wife, friend, and even lover are meaningless. However, she does not have enough strength to use the resulting angst to become an authentic being, so she finally decides to remain with her husband.

== "The Childhood of a Leader" ==
The Childhood of a Leader is the tale of the mental development of a boy named Lucien Fleurier from around age 4 to his early adulthood. Lucien, the son of a rich industrialist who is expected from birth to eventually take over his father's business, searches for identity and meaning along with an intellectual explanation for his persistent sense of alienation. In his teenage years, he becomes obsessed with Freudian psychoanalysis and falls under the influence of an older surrealist who eventually pressures him into a sexual relationship. In the end he finds his answers in the work of Maurice Barrès; community in a fascist youth organisation, the Camelots du Roi; a sense of power and self-respect in violent antisemitism; and meaning in the rights and responsibilities that he believes are accorded to him through his privileged position in society.

== Adaptations ==
The 1967 film The Wall is based on the story of the same name.

The 2016 film The Childhood of a Leader is based on the story of the same name.
