= Tom Sweet =

English actor

- Born: c. 2005; London, England
- Occupation: Actor
- Years active: 2016-present

Tom Sweet (born c. 2005) is an English film and television actor. He began his career as a child actor. He currently stars in the MGM+ and Paramount+ series Treasure Island (2026).

== Early life ==
From Hackney, London, Sweet is the son of a graphic designer while his mother works in fashion.

== Career ==
Sweet became a child actor after being spotted by casting agents while playing football on London Fields in 2014, and despite having no acting training or experience other than playing Joseph in a school nativity play, Sweet put in an acclaimed performance in his debut film The Childhood Of A Leader (2016). Sweet also portrayed a young Robert Catesby in the first three episodes of BBC One's Gunpowder (2017).

In 2018, Sweet had film appearances as Koen in Amma Asante's Where Hands Touch alongside Abbie Cornish and Christopher Eccleston, Jonah in World War II drama Ashes in the Snow, and Fritz, Clara's (Mackenzie Foy) brother in Disney's The Nutcracker and the Four Realms. He appeared in the 2019 romantic drama film The Drifters.

In 2021, he starred in short film Enjoy alongside Himesh Patel. Sweet portrayed a young Pip in the Steven Knight 2023 adaptation for BBC One of Great Expectations by Charles Dickens.

In 2026, Sweet portrayed an adolescent Charles Trask in Netflix adaptation of East of Eden. That year, Sweet could be seen Jim Hawkins in the MGM+ and Paramount+ adaptation of Treasure Island alongside Hayley Atwell and David Oyelowo, with his Hawkins written as having savant-like powers.

== Filmography ==
=== Film ===
| Year | Title | Role | Notes |
|---|---|---|---|
| 2016 | The Childhood Of A Leader | Prescott | |
| 2018 | Where Hands Touch | Koen | |
| 2018 | Ashes in the Snow | Jonah | |
| 2018 | The Nutcracker and the Four Realms | Fritz Stahlbaum | |
| 2019 | The Drifters | Leon | |
| 2020 | Wildflowers | Charles | Short film |
| 2021 | The Cursed | Joseph | |
| 2021 | Enjoy | Archibald | Short film |

=== Television ===
| Year | Title | Role | Notes |
|---|---|---|---|
| 2017 | Gunpowder | Young Robert Catesby | 2 episodes |
| 2023 | Great Expectations | Young Pip | 2 episodes |
| 2026 | East of Eden | Adolescent Charles Trask | Episode: "Brothers" |
| 2026 | Treasure Island | Jim Hawkins | Main role |
