= Where Hands Touch =

2018 film directed by Amma Asante

- US theatrical release poster
- Directed by: Amma Asante
- Written by: Amma Asante
- Produced by: Charlie Hanson
- Starring: Amandla Stenberg; George MacKay; Abbie Cornish; Christopher Eccleston; Tom Sweet; Jean-Claude de Sober; Thomas Hans Schumber-Bonjour
- Cinematography: Remi Adefarasin
- Edited by: Steve Singleton
- Music by: Anne Chmelewsky
- Production companies: British Film Company; Head Gear Films; RTE; Screen Ireland; Northern Ireland Screen; Metrol Technology; Pinewood Pictures; UMedia; Nexus Factory; RTBF; Belgian Tax Shelter
- Distributed by: Shear Entertainment
- Release dates: 9 September 2018 (TIFF); 14 September 2018 (United States)
- Running time: 122 minutes
- Countries: United Kingdom; Belgium; Ireland; Canada
- Language: English
- Box office: $128,269

Where Hands Touch is a 2018 romantic war drama film written and directed by Amma Asante and starring Amandla Stenberg, George MacKay, Abbie Cornish, Christopher Eccleston, and Tom Sweet. It tells a fictional story of Leyna (Stenberg), a teenage girl under threat because of her mixed heritage while surviving in Nazi Germany. The film is based on historical record of the persecution of black people in Nazi Germany.

The film is a British, Belgian, Canadian, and Irish co-production. Principal photography on the film began in November 2016 in Belgium and lasted for a month, wrapping up in December 2016.

Where Hands Touch premiered at the Toronto International Film Festival on 9 September 2018. It was released theatrically in the United States on 14 September 2018 by Vertical Entertainment. It received mixed reviews, with praise directed at Stenberg's performance, and criticism toward its screenplay.

== Plot ==
Leyna is a 16-year-old girl fighting to survive in Nazi Germany during World War II. Living with her white mother, Kerstin, and her younger half-brother, Koen, her mother is constantly targeted for having been with an African man, and Leyna for being a product of their interracial relationship, which was forbidden during the Nazi regime.

The family goes to live near Kerstin’s reluctant sister to escape the Gestapo in their hometown. One day, a Hitler Youth by the name of Lutz accidentally knocks Leyna to the ground while riding his bike, injuring her. After the incident, he takes an interest in Leyna, who initially ignores him. When Leyna is kicked out of school, her mother takes her to work at the factory, where Lutz sees Leyna every day as he passes by on his bike. However, being the son of a high-ranking SS officer, Lutz struggles to follow in his father’s footsteps and must adhere to the brutal regime that scorns Leyna’s existence. Meanwhile, despite Kerstin’s teachings, Koen is forced to join the Hitler Youth, starts to accept the Nazi ideals, and discriminates against his sister.

Lutz and Leyna begin spending time together in secret, ultimately falling in love. They share their first passionate kiss hidden in a doorway, and eventually have sex when Lutz is forced to hide Leyna away in his home while Nazi soldiers unexpectedly begin to violently search everyone in the streets one day. As the war escalates, violence against all non-Aryans and those not deemed “true” Germans increases, and one day Kerstin is dragged away by soldiers in place of Leyna, leaving Koen and Leyna without their mother. Koen blames Leyna for the loss of their mother and the prejudice and cruelty they face each day. Leyna takes Koen to stay with their Aryan aunt.

Leyna goes to see Lutz but is informed he has been suddenly summoned to the frontlines, while she is sent to a Nazi labor camp. Leyna soon finds out she’s pregnant and must keep it a secret (as she is supposed to have been sterilized). Lutz is stationed as an SS guard at the same camp and is appalled to discover an emaciated Leyna as their feelings for each other resurface. During one of their secret rendezvous, he realizes she’s carrying his child and begs her to run away with him, so she will no longer suffer, and they can finally be together. Leyna refuses, knowing their death is inevitable should they attempt an escape.

After a bombing by the Americans, Lutz takes the opportunity to plan an escape with Leyna, but he is discovered, shot, and killed by his father, who is determined to keep them apart at all costs. Leyna falls to the ground, unable to move, staring at Lutz’s body until eventually an American soldier comes to take her away. Seven weeks later, she is heavily pregnant and recovering in an American displacement camp. Here, she miraculously reunites with her mother and brother.

== Cast ==
- Amandla Stenberg as Leyna
- George MacKay as Lutz
- Abbie Cornish as Kerstin
- Christopher Eccleston as Heinz
- Tom Sweet as Koen
- Alec Newman as Juttner
- Natasha Little as Hida
- Lucy Russell as Teacher
- Tomiwa Edun as American Soldier
- Simon Harrison as SS Guard
- Charles De'Ath as SS Kruger
- Josie Walker as Kapo
- Tim Faraday as Betz
- Tom Goodman-Hill as Wihelm Warner
- Olivia Vinall as Hermine

== Production ==
=== Development ===
Director/screenwriter Amma Asante had the idea for the film after she came across an old photo taken in Nazi Germany of a black schoolgirl standing among her white classmates. Where Hands Touch tells a fictional story of a mixed-race teenage girl's relationship with a Hitler Youth member, but it is based on historical record of the persecution of black people in Nazi Germany. It took Asante 12 years to take the project to the big screen. Asante told the BBC that she faced disbelief and dismissiveness from some people when she spoke about her research for the film. "Often there's a form of disbelief, of questioning, sometimes even a dismissiveness of the difficult lives these people led," she said.

=== Filming ===
Principal photography on the film began in November 2016 and wrapped up in December 2016 after shooting took place in Belgium (Werister coal mine) and the Isle of Man.

== Release ==
On 20 May 2017, Sony Pictures Worldwide Acquisitions acquired the international distribution rights to the film, excluding select territories in Europe and Australia. It had its world premiere at the Toronto International Film Festival on 9 September 2018. It was released in the United States on 14 September 2018 by Vertical Entertainment.

== Reception ==
=== Critical response ===
On Rotten Tomatoes, the film has an approval rating of 43%, based on 49 reviews, with an average rating of 5.4/10. The website's consensus reads, "Where Hands Touch is noteworthy for its exploration of a little-discussed corner of World War II, even if its story leaves something to be desired in the telling." On Metacritic the film has a score of 44% based on reviews from 13 critics, indicating "mixed or average reviews".

Glenn Kenny of The New York Times criticized the film for "romanticization of Nazis".

=== Box office ===
Where Hands Touch had a limited theatrical release in five theaters in the United Kingdom, ranking at number 34 at the box office in its first weekend and grossing $11,740 after five weeks in select UK theaters. In the United States, the film was released to 103 theaters, ranking at number 42 at the box office and grossing $67,743 in its first and only weekend in US theaters. The film grossed a total of $128,269 worldwide.

== See also ==
- List of black films of the 2010s
- Afro-Germans
- Rhineland Bastard
- Persecution of black people in Nazi Germany
