= The Sleepwalker (2014 film) =

2014 drama film by Mona Fastvold

- Sundance film poster
- Directed by: Mona Fastvold
- Written by: Mona Fastvold; Brady Corbet
- Produced by: Karin Julsrud; Tim Duff; Julie Christeas; Schuyler Weiss; Turid Øversveen
- Starring: Gitte Witt; Christopher Abbott; Stephanie Ellis; Brady Corbet
- Cinematography: Zack Galler
- Edited by: Mike Mazzotta; Jon Endre Mørk
- Music by: Sondre Lerche; Kato Ådland
- Production companies: 4 1/2 Film; Tandem Pictures
- Distributed by: Nordisk Filmdistribusjon
- Release date: January 20, 2014 (Sundance Film Festival)
- Running time: 92 minutes
- Countries: Norway; United States
- Language: English

The Sleepwalker is a 2014 drama film directed by Mona Fastvold, and co-written by Fastvold and Brady Corbet. The film stars Gitte Witt, Christopher Abbott, Stephanie Ellis and Corbet. The film premiered in-competition in the US Dramatic Category at 2014 Sundance Film Festival on January 20, 2014.

== Plot ==
A young couple, Kaia and Andrew, are renovating Kaia's secluded family estate. Their lives are violently disrupted upon the unexpected arrival of Kaia's sister, Christine, and her fiancé, Ira.

== Cast ==
- Gitte Witt as Kaia
- Christopher Abbott as Andrew
- Stephanie Ellis as Christine
- Brady Corbet as Ira

== Reception ==
The Sleepwalker received mixed reviews upon its premiere at the 2014 Sundance Film Festival. Rodrigo Perez of Indiewire praised the film and said that "A darkly mysterious and extremely accomplished first feature, The Sleepwalker suggests the things we lost in the fire might be much deeper than material possessions." Thomas Willett of Cinemabeach gave the film a positive review and said that "As a debut, Fastvold makes a promising, complex film that shows confidence. With great performances by an intimate cast, she manages to capture the nuances of disagreement without falling into soapy territory."

Dennis Harvey, in his review for Variety, gave the film a negative review by saying that "Mona Fastvold's consistently intriguing debut may leave audiences feeling it's all buildup and scant payoff." Justin Lowe in his review for The Hollywood Reporter called the film "A tentative feint toward genre territory can’t conceal the slightness of this heightened drama." On Rotten Tomatoes, it has an approval rating of 43% based on 14 reviews.
