= The Childhood of a Leader (novella) =

French short story

The Childhood of a Leader (L'enfance d'un chef) is a short story or novella of slightly over a hundred pages by Jean-Paul Sartre. It is the final story in Sartre's collection that reflects a significant change from nonexistence to existence through chronicling the life of Lucien Fleurier since he was a child until he became an antisemitic Camelot who believes that he can become a true leader. The work was published in 1939 with four other short stories in a collection entitled The Wall.

== Synopsis ==
The work tells the story of Lucien Fleurier from his early childhood, where his entourage finds him beautiful and cute, to the point of sometimes confusing him with a girl, until the end of adolescence, when he understood that he would be a "leader". Over the course of the narrative, he will try to get to know himself through introspection (interest in psychoanalysis) and other models proposed by his few friends but after which he always ends up feeling alienated. It is after observing the respect he imposes by deliberately refusing to shake hands with a Jew that he understands how he will become a leader, a concern that had been with him since childhood because his father owns a factory and intends him to take over.

== Style and approach ==
Although written in the third person, the work presents Lucien's story from an introspective view-point following his thoughts, perceptions and observations as he experiences them. These are presented in a somewhat impressionistic way, in chronological order but without precise time references, with generally short and factual sentences and long and sometimes heteroclite paragraphs, without chapters or any other division.

== Structure of the story ==
The Childhood of a Leader is a story that reflects a life of a person named Lucien Fleurier, his confused and lost personality, and the change that occurs in him from childhood to manhood. The story is not separated into parts or sections. In the following, the plot is divided into parts to make it easier to understand the chronology of the story.

His life as a child

Lucien began to question his existence since he was a child. He had developed difficulties of understanding himself, his identity, his goals in life, and the most important of all his real existence. His question was increased and intensified more often throughout the story since others had difficulties in defining his gender once they see him. They thought he was more like a girl with wavy gold hair and red cheeks. His confusion of understanding his self and life dragged him to believe that his parents were not his real parents, and that he was an orphan. He also thought that his parents might be different persons with different personalities, who pretended to be his own parents during the day. Moreover, he thought that he might be a sleepwalker who had a different life of what his current life was with different features and traits, but he changed to be Lucien who we know throughout the day. Lucien did not only believe that he was non-existent or nothing, but also believed that static things and especially the chest-nut tree were nothing too because they did not give a sign of life, reaction or a feeling.

His life as an adolescent

At his school period, although he was a successful student, his classmates made fun of him and his body and were calling him a "beanpole". Lucien unfortunately was affected by others' opinions, and this was a reason for him to continue in questioning his existence and his abilities to become a boss as his father. In addition, he attempted suicide many times because of his self-confusion.

His meeting with Bergère

Lucien met a person called Berliac who had also a complexity in his life, namely the Oedipus complex. Because of it, Berliac developed a sexual attraction to his mother and a desire to make love with her. They both understood each other because they had serious and complicated complexities that needed psychoanalysis. Achille Bergère, Berliac's friend, had met with Lucien by chance. They both were attracted to each other's shapes from the first meeting. Bergère thought of the case of Lucien as a disorder and then they continued to meet each other frequently. Bergère tried to draw Lucien's attention that he was a homosexual who resembled Rimbaud, a character in a story that Bergère read about. He tried to convince Lucien that this can help him know his real self and go on through this way. Thus, they were about to have sex in the hotel after their caresses and embraces. However, Lucien believed that this behavior might stand as a barrier in his way to become a leader. In addition, his image in the eyes of the others might be hurt and this definitely will prevent him from being a leader. Thus, he decided to flee away from Bergère and Berliac and consider them as if they were dead.

His meeting with Berthe

Later on, he met Berthe, the daughter of his father's worker, who came to work as a maid in the house of the Fleuriers. During her stay, she and Lucien were attracted sexually to each other, and this was a reason for Lucien to deny his homosexuality. However, he could not let himself sleep with her in order not to hurt his reputation that may prevent him from being a leader later.

His meeting with Lemordant and the gang

He met Lemordant, an active guy who interfered in politics, hated Jews, and supported the right wing. Lucien was impressed and blown away by Lemordant's confident and tough personality. Guigard was one of Lemordant's gang who met Lucien and tried to show him a good-looking girl called Maud to hang out with. His relationship with Maud started with a kiss and ended up with having sex later. Having a mistress increased his self-confidence and pushed away his feeling that he was homosexual.

Being a Camelot and discovering his existence

He developed his hatred and antisemitic feelings towards Jews and tried to engage in the life of politics. The incidence that made a turning point in Lucien's personality was his refusal to shake hands with a Jew that made his friends respect him. Consequently, he started to feel that he is a real man with convictions, rights and existence. He dragged his strength out of being seen as a man with convictions. In the end, he started to believe that he has the right to be existent, to have a virgin wife, and to become a leader.

== Interpretations and critics ==
Due to the many similar characteristics and the friendship of the two authors it is assumed that Simone de Beauvoir's short story Marguerite influenced Sartre's The Childhood of a Leader and vice versa. The two stories depict the lives of their protagonists chronologically, starting from their childhood. They are basically Bildungsroman, though Sartre rebukes the outcome of the main character's life. Both authors borrowed from their own personal lives to build their protagonists, however Sartre denied the story being a biographical work. There are also analogies in the seduction between Lucien and Bergère that parallel the one between Marguerite and Marie-Ange, with the respective mediators Berliac and Denis. The experience is seen as a mistake and unpleasant experience for both main characters. "It is very clear that Beauvoir's account of the seduction episode preceded Sartre's," which was inspired by Beauvoir's experience with her colleague. After discussing with Sartre The Childhood of a Leader, Beauvoir plans to write about herself as a little girl. The mutual influence is an example of the sharing of intellectual property by the two authors.

Sartre's Being and Nothingness depicts the failure of love and failure of any sort of relational interactions. Sartre portrays in this story hate and its failure. Lucien experiments with Freudianism and surrealism before finding hate, which truly keeps the abyss at bay. His hate is not developed through interactions with Jews, but is created because he is in a fog and needs to feel grounded. The gaze of the other, whether in love or hate objectifies and seeks to reduce the other. Lucien does not want to find identity through self-reflection which confuses and terrifies him but through the hatred of the other and therefore he masochistically seeks objectification. The gaze of others gives Lucien an identity. Therefore, "Sartre's mistrust of the outer world's effect upon the self" is shown here.

Moreover, grotesque aspects are prevalent in the story. For example the description of little Lucien sitting and straining on the potty and the graphically explicit depiction of homosexual sex. The obscenity in the story is intended as a countermeasure to respectability. Sartre uses the grotesque in order to convey literary caricature and parody and existentialist philosophy. Furthermore it can be seen that, Lucien's inability to enjoy love impedes his possibility of happiness. The story communicates the philosophy that no kind of love fulfills his justification for existence.

The characters are portrayed against a broad social background and can be considered typical representatives of particular social classes. Lucien displays specific kinds of self-deception as archetypical of the dominant class in France of the thirties, such that the story can be read as one of social conditioning. Lucien's self-questioning about his identity is described as a fog in his head. He firstly questions his gender when he is a child due to his appearance and clothes, then he questions his love for his parents. Later, after Bergère's seduction, he questions if he is a homosexual or not. His problem is the quest for redemption from eternal reflection and its resulting self-torturing. He finally deduces that he must therefore not look for his identity within himself, but in the image which he creates among others. Lucien's self-deception exists on the one hand in his denial of his responsibility for his decisions by obtaining them from the objective order of things and on the other hand by the denial of his social conditioning and insisting on his free choice motivated by his contemplation.

== Quotes ==
- "Lucien wanted to know how Dad talked to the workers when he was at the factory, and Dad showed him how to do it, and his voice was all changed. "Will I also become a leader?—But of course, my boy, that's why I made you.—And who will I order from?—Well, when I die, you'll be the boss of my factory and command my workers. "you will have to know how to make yourself obey and be loved."
- "Lucien took Maud in his arms; he was a little embarrassed because Fanny was looking at them: he would have liked the kiss to be long and successful, but he wondered how people breathe. In the end, it wasn't as difficult as he thought, all he had to do was kiss on the bias to clear the nostrils."
- "He felt a bitter pride. "That's what it's like to hold on tightly to your opinions; you can't live in society anymore."

== Adaptation ==
The story was brought to the screen in 2015 by Brady Corbet and features Bérénice Bejo and Liam Cunningham as Lucien's parent couple as well as Robert Pattinson in the role of a family friend, also proving to be a lover of the young man's mother and true father.
