= Mona Fastvold =

Norwegian filmmaker and actress (born 1981)

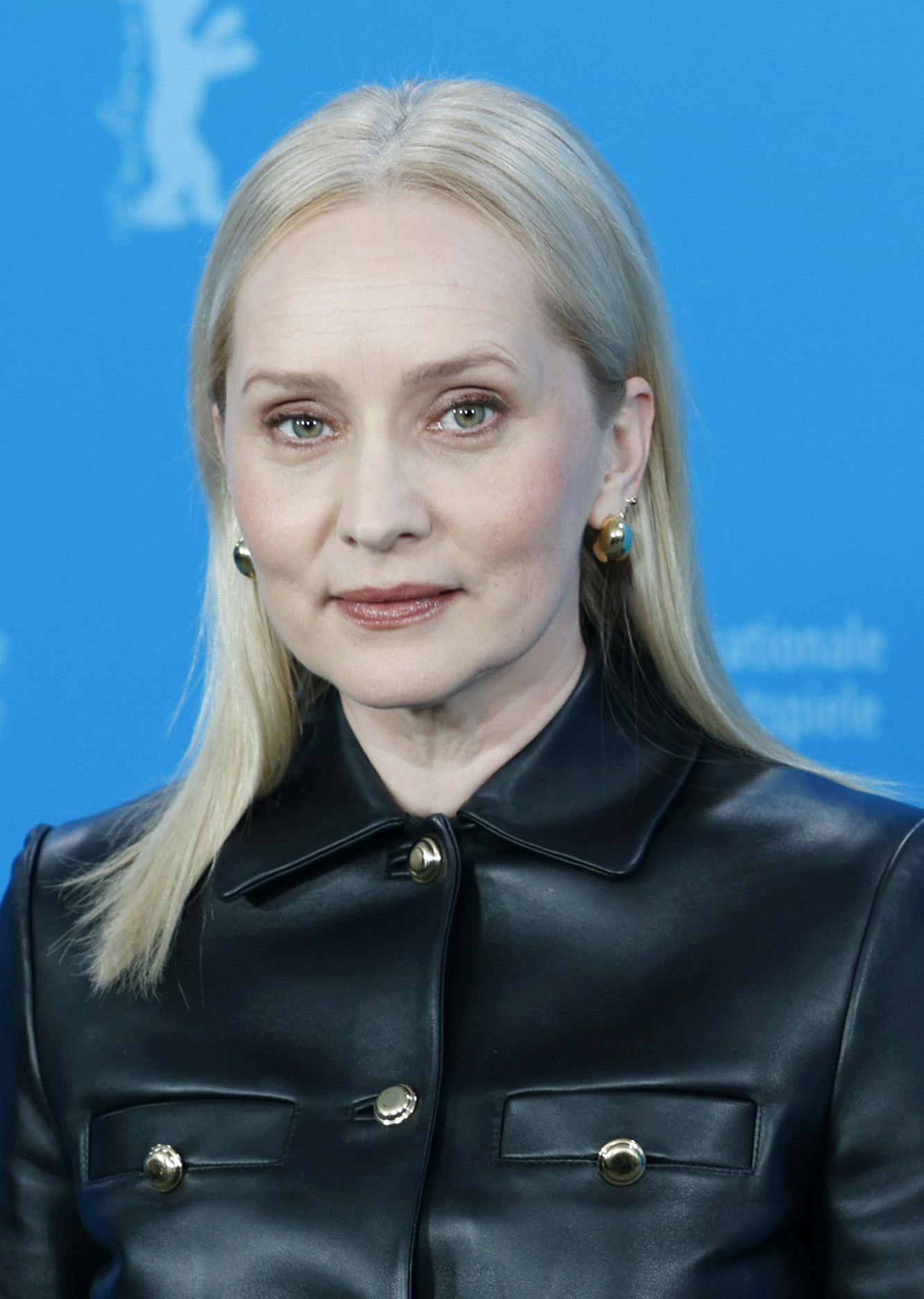
- Fastvold in 2026
- Born: 7 March 1981 (age 45); Oslo, Norway
- Other name: Mona Lerche
- Occupations: Film-maker; actress
- Years active: 1997–present
- Spouse: Sondre Lerche (m. 2005; div. 2013)
- Partner(s): Brady Corbet (2013–present)
- Children: 1

Mona Fastvold (born 7 March 1981) is a Norwegian filmmaker and actress. She is best known for directing the drama films The Sleepwalker (2014), The World to Come (2020) and The Testament of Ann Lee (2025). As a screenwriter, she is known for co-writing The Brutalist (2024), which was nominated for the Academy Award for Best Original Screenplay.

== Early life ==
Mona Fastvold was born in Oslo, Norway on 7 March 1981.

== Career ==
Fastvold had a minor role in The Other Woman (2009) and has directed music videos for several musicians, most notably her ex-husband Sondre Lerche.

She directed the drama films The Sleepwalker (2014), The World to Come (2020), and The Testament of Ann Lee (2025). She co-wrote the films The Childhood of a Leader (2015), Vox Lux (2018), and The Brutalist (2024) with her partner Brady Corbet. The latter earned the two nominations for the Academy Awards for Best Original Screenplay and Best Picture.

== Personal life ==
In 2005, Fastvold married Norwegian musician Sondre Lerche. They divorced in 2013.

Since 2013, Fastvold has been in a relationship with American actor and filmmaker Brady Corbet. They have a daughter named Ada, born in 2014. Fastvold and Corbet met by being introduced by their mutual friend, actor Christopher Abbott, who is now their daughter’s godfather. After meeting, they became friends and began writing films together. They then became a couple after finishing production on their first film, The Sleepwalker.

Fastvold lives in Brooklyn, New York City.

== Filmography ==
=== Film ===
Year	Title	Director	Writer
2014	The Sleepwalker	Yes	Yes
2015	The Childhood of a Leader	No	Yes
2018	Vox Lux	No	Yes
2019	The Mustang	No	Yes
2020	The World to Come	Yes	No
2024	The Brutalist	No	Yes
2025	The Testament of Ann Lee	Yes	Yes

Acting roles

Year	Title	Role	Notes
2003	Capo Nord		
2009	The Other Woman	Sonia	as Mona Lerche
2018	Vox Lux		

Short film

Year	Title	Role	Notes
2008	Fault Lines	Helen	
2009	Snapshots	Eve	As Mona Lerche
2011	Match	Jacqueline	As Mona Lerche
2013	The Thing Is	Rachel	
2026	Discipline	—N/a	As director

=== Television ===
Director

Year	Title	Notes
2023	The Crowded Room	3 episodes
2025	Long Bright River	Episode: "Blind Spot"

Acting roles

Year	Title	Role	Notes
1997	Asylet	Gry	1 episode
1998	Nini	Vibeke	1 episode
1999	Smørøyet		1 episode
2006	Hotel Cæsar	Daphne Flaa	65 episodes
2020	Homemade		1 episode
