= The Childhood of a Leader (film) =

2015 film by Brady Corbet

- Theatrical release poster
- Directed by: Brady Corbet
- Screenplay by: Brady Corbet; Mona Fastvold
- Based on: The Childhood of a Leader by Jean-Paul Sartre
- Produced by: Antoine de Clermont-Tonnerre; Chris Coen; Brady Corbet; Ron Curtis; Helena Danielsson; Mona Fastvold; István Major
- Starring: Bérénice Bejo; Liam Cunningham; Stacy Martin; Robert Pattinson; Tom Sweet
- Cinematography: Lol Crawley
- Edited by: Dávid Jancsó
- Music by: Scott Walker
- Production companies: Bow and Arrow Entertainment; FilmTeam; Hepp Film; Media House Capital; MACT Productions; Unanimous Entertainment; Scope Pictures
- Distributed by: IFC Films (United States); Soda Pictures (United Kingdom)
- Release dates: 5 September 2015 (Venice); 22 July 2016 (United States); 19 August 2016 (United Kingdom)
- Running time: 116 minutes
- Countries: United States; United Kingdom; Hungary; Sweden; France; Canada; Belgium
- Languages: English; French; German
- Budget: $5 million
- Box office: $245,546

The Childhood of a Leader is a 2015 historical coming-of-age psychological drama film co-written, co-produced and directed by Brady Corbet in his directorial debut. It is loosely based on Jean-Paul Sartre's short story of the same name, published in 1939 in a collection entitled The Wall. Corbet co-wrote the screenplay with his partner Mona Fastvold.

An international co-production between the United States, the United Kingdom, Hungary, Sweden, France, Canada and Belgium, the film chronicles the childhood of a fascist leader in the period immediately following World War I, and stars Bérénice Bejo, Liam Cunningham, Stacy Martin, Robert Pattinson, and Tom Sweet. Production began in early 2015, in Budapest, (Hungary). The film had its world premiere in competition in the Horizon section at the 72nd Venice International Film Festival on 5 September 2015, and won two awards at the festival, Best Debut film and Best Director.

== Plot ==
=== Overture ===
In 1919, Prescott, an American boy, has temporarily retreated to the French countryside with his father, an American diplomat who is there to help negotiate the Treaty of Versailles, and his mother, who is German-born.

=== I. The First Tantrum, A Sign of Things to Come ===
After rehearsing for a church pageant, Prescott throws rocks at the other children and their parents and then runs into the woods. When he returns, he sees his father, who has been drinking with family friend Charles Marker. Prescott is forced to apologize to the townspeople and, though he is unrepentant, he is forgiven.

Though his mother is fluent in French, Prescott has been forbidden from speaking anything but English with his mother.

=== II. The Second Tantrum, A New Year ===
As the family is living in France, however, the mother is permitted to hire a tutor, Ada, to teach Prescott some French language. Prescott later sees Ada alone with his father, which his father claims was because he was paying her. Afterwards, during one of their lessons, Prescott grabs Ada's breast inappropriately. Though she is upset by the encounter, Ada does not mention it to his mother.

The father, along with several trusted aides, spends some time in secret meetings at the house, no longer having faith in the negotiations. One of the aides, seeing Prescott, mistakes him for a girl, which causes him to strip off his clothes and lock himself in his room for several days. His mother intends to starve him out but he is secretly fed by Mona, the housekeeper. When the mother discovers this, she fires Mona. Mona vows to destroy the mother and her family.

Prescott spends several days locked in his room learning French. Afterwards, he recites a text in front of his mother and Ada and then asks his mother to dismiss Ada so he can continue his studies alone. The father returns to find the mother with Marker. Upon seeing that Prescott is still disrobed, he promises to lash him, which results in a physical altercation in which he injures the boy's arm.

=== III. The Third Tantrum, "It's a dragon..." ===
In celebration of the signed treaty, the family throws a dinner party for some close intimates. During the dinner, the father asks the mother to lead the group in prayer; she in turn asks Prescott to do so. Instead, he announces that he doesn't believe in prayer anymore. When the mother tries to take him to his room, he strikes her several times in the temple with a rock, badly injuring her and causing her to lose consciousness. When the father attempts to apprehend him, Prescott runs off the stairs. While running, he trips and paralyzes himself. He is approached by Marker and his associates, who reassure him that he is alright.

=== +. A New Era or Prescott, the Bastard ===
Many years later, Prescott is now the military leader of an authoritarian state. Crowds of adoring fans greet him. He has grown to look like Marker, his biological father.

== Cast ==
- Bérénice Bejo as The Mother
- Liam Cunningham as The Father
- Stacy Martin as Ada
- Robert Pattinson as Charles Marker / adult Prescott
- Tom Sweet as Prescott, The Bastard
- Yolande Moreau as Mona
- Jacques Boudet as The Priest
- Michel Subor
- Sophie Curtis
- Patrick McCullough
- Michael Epp as Mr. Advisor
- Roderick Hill as Older American Gentleman

== Production ==
"The film takes place in 1919, it stars a child, it's in French and English. Luckily it's not going to be four-and-a-half hours long and it's not going to be black-and-white. But that's it. It's not a very easy pitch. It's sort of about the birth of a megalomaniac and with a maniacal sort of ego at the turn of the century. It's about the birth of fascism that occurred during the signing of the Treaty of Versailles."

— Brady Corbet, director of The Childhood of a Leader, on the film.

=== Development ===
Brady Corbet began writing the script of the film ten years before on his own but later put it down as he considered it "too big" for a debut film. He later picked it up again after support from his partner Mona Fastvold. On 1 April 2013, it was announced that Corbet was set to make his feature film directorial debut with a France-set World War I film, based on the script he co-wrote with Mona Fastvold. Corbet would produce along with French producers Antoine de Clermont-Tonnerre and Chris Coen, as well as Istvan Major. Film Producer Helena Danielsson of Hepp Film also came on board to get the film additional financing.

In 2015, Corbet said that the script of the film was inspired by Robert Bresson's Mouchette, Maurice Pialat's Under the Sun of Satan, Ermanno Olmi's The Tree of Wooden Clogs, Carl Theodor Dreyer's Day of Wrath and Stanley Kubrick's Barry Lyndon.

=== Casting ===
On 10 December 2013, it was announced that Juliette Binoche, Tim Roth and Robert Pattinson had joined the cast of the film. In August 2014, it was announced that both Binoche and Roth had left the project. Roth dropped due to scheduling conflict while Binoche cited the reason that it was "too dark". The same month Binoche and Roth were replaced by Bérénice Bejo and Liam Cunningham.

Corbet talking about the casting and characters in the film said that

I have intentionally not revealed the identity of (the boy who will become leader) character. And it's a funny thing because it's not for the reasons that people think. One thing I will happily tell everybody is that the character is not Hitler [laughs]. And the character is not Mussolini. It's someone else. And there's the dramatic event where you learn who this person is and that's something I want to save for people. Robert Pattinson is not playing Hitler as you now know [laughs]. I'll go on the record saying that.

Corbet held auditions for the casting of the role of Prescott, describing it as "(we) held simple auditions (one page of text) for the boys reading for the main role. Des Hamilton and his great team found Tom Sweet and brought him in. Tom was everything we had envisioned and more. He is the film’s greatest triumph."

=== Pre-production ===
Production was originally slated to start from November 2014 but later moved to January 2015. Pattinson describing the film said that "It's about the youth of a future dictator in the Thirties, like an amalgamation of Hitler, Mussolini and some others." Bejo talking about her character in the film said that "(I'm playing) the character of a mother whose son is very particular, a little awkward and weird. Over the scenes you're realizing that it is not a normal guy, he'll become a monster or something. And it is about the relationship with the mother and father."

=== Filming ===
Principal photography began from 30 January 2015 in Budapest and continued till 1 March 2015. On 3 February 2015, filming took place at Buda Castle and Hungarian National Gallery.

== Music ==
Singer-songwriter, composer and record producer Scott Walker composed the score of the film. The soundtrack album was released by 4AD on 19 August 2016. The film served as closing film at 2016 International Film Festival Rotterdam, where the score of the film was performed live during the screening of the film.

== Promotion and marketing ==
On 13 February 2015, Producer Chris Coen released the first image featuring Robert Pattinson, Bérénice Bejo and Liam Cunningham in their costumes. Another still featuring Pattinson, Bejo and Cunningham was released on 8 April 2015. Exclusive footage from the film screened at Marché du Film of 2015 Cannes Film Festival. Two clips from the film were released on 4 September 2015. On 25 October 2015, it was screened at Jacob Burns Film Center.

== Release ==
The film released in the US on 22 July 2016, in theatres and on VOD simultaneously by IFC Films. Originally it was to be released by Metrodome Distribution in UK but few days before its release the company filed for bankruptcy, after which Soda Pictures released it in UK on 19 August 2016.

== Reception ==
The film received positive reviews from critics, with emphasis on Corbet's screenplay and direction, the performances of the cast, Scott Walker's music and Lol Crawley's cinematography. Review aggregator Rotten Tomatoes reports that 90% of 66 critics have given the film a positive review, with a rating average of 7.40/10. The site's critical consensus reads, "The Childhood of a Leader mirrors the rise of fascism in post-WWI Europe with a well-acted, confidently crafted look at one young man's unsettling coming of age." Metacritic gives the film a score of 68 based on reviews from 18 critics, indicating "generally favorable reviews".

David Ehrlich in his review for Indiewire said, "With his unusually accomplished directorial debut, Corbet delivers a strange and startling film that reflects the unique trajectory of his career, as well as the influence of the iconoclastic directors with whom he's already worked." Lee Marshall of Screen International wrote a positive review for the film, saying, "The Childhood of a Leader is as relentlessly sombre and compelling as the film’s remarkable, full-volume orchestral soundtrack" and compared it with Michael Haneke's work, saying, "though it shares something of Haneke's dispassionate view of human nature, The Childhood of a Leader is in no way derivative. Dominated by dread, veering into art horror at points, this compulsively dark story takes no prisoners." Tommaso Tocci of The Film Stage called it "a huge psychological and tonal balancing act that could crumble at each turn, and yet never does." Guy Lodge of Variety called it "a overweening [sic], maddening but not inconsiderable directorial debut for actor Brady Corbet, which plays as something of a straight-faced parody of a well-upholstered historical biopic." In his review for Eye For Film, Damon Wise said, "It sounds like a slow-paced chamber piece, and some scenes are, but a brilliant framing device involving a stunning orchestral score by, of all people, Scott Walker gives the film a nerve-wracking urgency." John Bleasdale of Cine Vu gave it five out five stars by saying that "(it) is a dark, enigmatic piece of work that hovers between visionary greatness and petty domestic triviality. Corbet's inaugural stint behind the camera marks a stunning debut and the finest film at Venice thus far."

In contrast, Deborah Young in her review for The Hollywood Reporter said, "There is actually a lot of imagination at work in the film, though frustratingly it rarely comes together in an emotionally meaningful way."

=== Accolades ===
Year	Group/Award	Category	Recipient(s)	Result	Ref(s)
2015	Venice International Film Festival	Horizons (Orizzonti) – Best Film	Brady Corbet	Nominated	
2015	Venice International Film Festival	Lion of the Future – Luigi De Laurentiis Award for a Debut Film	Brady Corbet	Won	
2015	Venice International Film Festival	Horizons (Orizzonti) – Best Director	Brady Corbet	Won	
2015	Lisbon & Estoril Film Festival	TAP Revelation Award – Best Film	Brady Corbet	Nominated	
2015	Lisbon & Estoril Film Festival	TAP Revelation Award – Best Director	Brady Corbet	Won	
2016	American Society of Cinematographers	Spotlight Award	Brady Corbet	Nominated	
2016	Filmfest München	CineVision Award - Best Film By An Emerging Director	Brady Corbet	Nominated	
2016	Gothenburg Film Festival	International Debut Award	Brady Corbet	Nominated	
2016	International Istanbul Film Festival	Golden Tulip - International Competition	Brady Corbet	Nominated	
2016	International Istanbul Film Festival	Golden Tulip Special Jury Prize - International Competition	Brady Corbet	Won	
2016	Sydney Film Festival	Best Film	Brady Corbet	Nominated	
2017	Independent Spirit Awards	Best First Feature	Brady Corbet, Antoine de Clermont-Tonnerre, Chris Coen, Ron Curtis, Helena Danielsson, Mona Fastvold and István Major	Nominated	
2017	Independent Spirit Awards	Best Cinematography	Lol Crawley	Nominated	
