= Vox Lux =

2018 film by Brady Corbet

- Theatrical release poster
- Directed by: Brady Corbet
- Screenplay by: Brady Corbet
- Story by: Brady Corbet; Mona Fastvold
- Produced by: Christine Vachon; David Hinojosa; Brian Young; Gary Michael Walters; Cassandra Kulukundis; Robert Salerno; Michel Litvak; Svetlana Metkina; David Litvak; Andrew Lauren; D.J. Gugenheim
- Starring: Natalie Portman; Jude Law; Stacy Martin; Jennifer Ehle; Raffey Cassidy
- Cinematography: Lol Crawley
- Edited by: Matthew Hannam
- Music by: Scott Walker (score); Sia (songs)
- Production companies: Killer Films; Andrew Lauren Productions; Bold Films
- Distributed by: Neon
- Release dates: September 4, 2018 (Venice); December 7, 2018 (United States)
- Running time: 110 minutes
- Country: United States
- Language: English
- Budget: $11 million
- Box office: $1.4 million

Vox Lux is a 2018 American musical drama film written and directed by Brady Corbet, from a story by Corbet and Mona Fastvold. The film stars Natalie Portman, Jude Law, Raffey Cassidy, Stacy Martin and Jennifer Ehle.

Vox Lux had its world premiere at the 75th Venice International Film Festival on September 4, 2018, and was released in the United States on December 7, 2018, by Neon. The film received generally favorable reviews from film critics, and grossed $1.4 million on an $11 million budget.

== Plot ==
=== Prelude ===
In early January 2000, a boy named Cullen Active walks into his school in the Staten Island neighborhood of New Brighton, goes to an 8th grade class and shoots the teacher, Mrs. Dwyer. One student, 13-year-old Celeste Montgomery, calmly and compassionately talks to Cullen and offers to pray with him. However, he shoots all the students and kills himself; Celeste is later seen to be in one of only three ambulances carrying survivors from the scene.

=== Act 1: Genesis ===
As she slowly recovers from her injuries, Celeste and her older sister, Eleanor, write music together. Soon afterward, at an event led by Father Cliff in memory of the shooting victims, Celeste sings a song that she and Eleanor wrote titled "Wrapped Up". The song becomes an instant hit and Celeste is soon picked up by a manager.

By April 2000, Celeste is recording an EP in New York City. Over the next 20 months, Celeste manages and navigates the increasing pressures of her newfound fame. She and Eleanor indulge in bouts of partying that soon get in the way of Celeste's work. Celeste is subjected to sexual misconduct by an older musician and Eleanor has sex with Celeste's manager the night before the September 11 attacks. Nevertheless, Celeste continues to successfully rise in the music industry; her songs are quickly picked up on radio stations and demand grows for her first music video, "Hologram (Smoke and Mirrors)".

=== Act 2: Regenesis ===
In 2017, a terrorist shooting on a beach in Croatia is rumored to be linked to Celeste's music due to the masks worn by the criminals, which are similar to the masks from Celeste's 2001 "Hologram" video.

Celeste is now 31 years old and preparing for the first night of a concert tour for her sixth album, Vox Lux. Her manager tells her of the terrorist shooting, and then tells her to prepare for the ensuing press junkets. Before her first interview, Celeste takes her teenage daughter, Albertine (conceived in the encounter with the musician), to lunch. Once there, Celeste unveils her erratic and destructive behavior, aided by alcohol, resulting in Celeste and Albertine getting kicked out of the restaurant by the manager. It is revealed that, six years prior, Celeste permanently blinded herself in her left eye due to consuming excessive amounts of methanol while binge-drinking household cleaning products. Celeste then drove under the influence across three state lines, injuring a man in his left leg and pelvis in the process, which resulted in a public lawsuit.

After lunch, Celeste has a heated argument with Eleanor after discovering Albertine has recently lost her virginity. Eleanor has been Albertine's guardian since her birth. The press interviews begin soon after, with Celeste becoming increasingly unhinged after one interviewer mentions the driving incident. Her publicist decides to cancel the rest of the interviews scheduled that day and asks Celeste to rest before the concert. However, Celeste and her manager get high on drugs and have sex.

That evening, an impaired Celeste heads for the concert venue with her entourage in tow. She suffers a mental breakdown, but Eleanor successfully comforts her so that she can perform.

=== Finale ===
Celeste appears ready for the concert and preps for the stage with her band and background dancers. She performs multiple songs with elaborate dance numbers.

It is revealed that after she was shot at the age of 13, Celeste told Eleanor that she made a deal with the devil for her life. Her manager, Albertine, and Eleanor pensively look on at the façade of a performing Celeste.

== Cast ==
- Natalie Portman as Celeste
- Jude Law as The Manager
- Stacy Martin as Eleanor
- Jennifer Ehle as Josie the Publicist
- Raffey Cassidy as young Celeste and as Albertine
- Christopher Abbott as The Journalist
- Logan Riley Bruner as Cullen Active
- Maria Dizzia as Ms. Dwyer
- Meg Gibson as Celeste's mother
- Daniel London as Father Cliff
- Sahr Ngaujah as a recording engineer in 2000
- Micheál Richardson as The Musician
- Matt Servitto as Celeste's father
- Leslie Silva as The Stylist

In addition, Willem Dafoe provides the narration.

== Production ==
In August 2016, it was announced Brady Corbet would write and direct the film, with Christine Vachon, David Hinojosa and Brian Young producing the film under their Killer Films and Three Six Zero Group banners respectively. In September 2016, Rooney Mara joined the cast of the film, while Sia was hired to compose original songs for the film. In October 2016, Jude Law joined the cast of the film. In January 2017, Stacy Martin confirmed her involvement in the film. In January 2018, Natalie Portman joined the cast of the film, replacing Mara. In February 2018, Raffey Cassidy joined the cast of the film. In August 2018, it was reported that Sia would be contributing original songs and Scott Walker would be scoring the film. Speaking of his surprise involvement in the film, Willem Dafoe, who narrates the film, stated that “it was a very last-minute thing. I think Brady had another voice in there and he wasn’t quite happy with it, and at the last minute he had the idea to use me to be the narrator — which in terms of actual work isn’t a huge time commitment. It’s an important tonal element and framing device in the film. It’s a kind of go-between with the audience.” Corbet has discussed the challenges of making the film, saying that "nobody asked for it" and he did not make any money from it.

Principal photography began on February 1, 2018, in Floral Park, New York. Portman said her performance was influenced by what she had observed in documentaries on pop stars, such as Madonna and Lady Gaga.

== Release ==
Vox Lux premiered at the 75th Venice International Film Festival on September 4, 2018. It also screened at the 43rd Toronto International Film Festival on September 7, 2018. Shortly after, Neon acquired distribution rights to the film. It was screened at the 29th New Orleans Film Festival on October 23, 2018. It was theatrically released on December 7, 2018 and on VOD by Universal Home Entertainment on March 5, 2019. Sales of its DVD/Blu-ray releases grossed $121,480.

== Reception ==
=== Critical response ===
On Rotten Tomatoes, the film holds an approval rating of 62% based on 253 reviews, with an average rating of 6.5/10. The website's critical consensus reads: "Intriguing albeit flawed, Vox Lux probes the allures and pitfalls of modern celebrity with sharp intelligence and visual style, all held together by an assured Natalie Portman performance." On Metacritic, the film has a weighted average score of 67 out of 100, based on 39 reviews, indicating "generally favorable reviews".

Guy Lodge of Variety praised Portman's performance and called the film "a bold, often brilliant trip through the celebrity spin cycle."

=== Accolades ===
Award	Date of ceremony	Category	Recipient(s)	Result
CinEuphoria Awards	2019	Best Supporting Actress - International Competition	Natalie Portman	Nominated
CinEuphoria Awards	2019	Best Screenplay - International Competition	Brady Corbet	Nominated
CinEuphoria Awards	2019	Best Costume Design - International Competition	Keri Langerman	Nominated
Florida Film Critics Circle Awards	December 23, 2019	Best Actress	Natalie Portman	Nominated
Guild of Music Supervisors Awards	February 6, 2020	Best Music Supervision for Films Budgeted Under 10 Million Dollars	Margaret Yen and Alison Litton	Won
Hollywood Makeup Artist and Hair Stylist Guild Awards	February 16, 2019	Best Contemporary Hair Styling - Feature-Length Motion Picture	Esther Ahn and Daniel Koye	Nominated
Lisbon & Estoril Film Festival	2018	Best Film	Brady Corbet	Nominated
London Critics Circle Film Awards	January 30, 2020	Young British/Irish Performer of the Year	Raffey Cassidy	Nominated
Motovun Film Festival	2019	Best Film	Brady Corbet	Nominated
Stockholm Film Festival	2018	Impact Award	Brady Corbet	Nominated
Venice Film Festival	September 8, 2018	Golden Lion	Brady Corbet	Nominated
