= Brady Corbet =

American filmmaker and actor (born 1988)

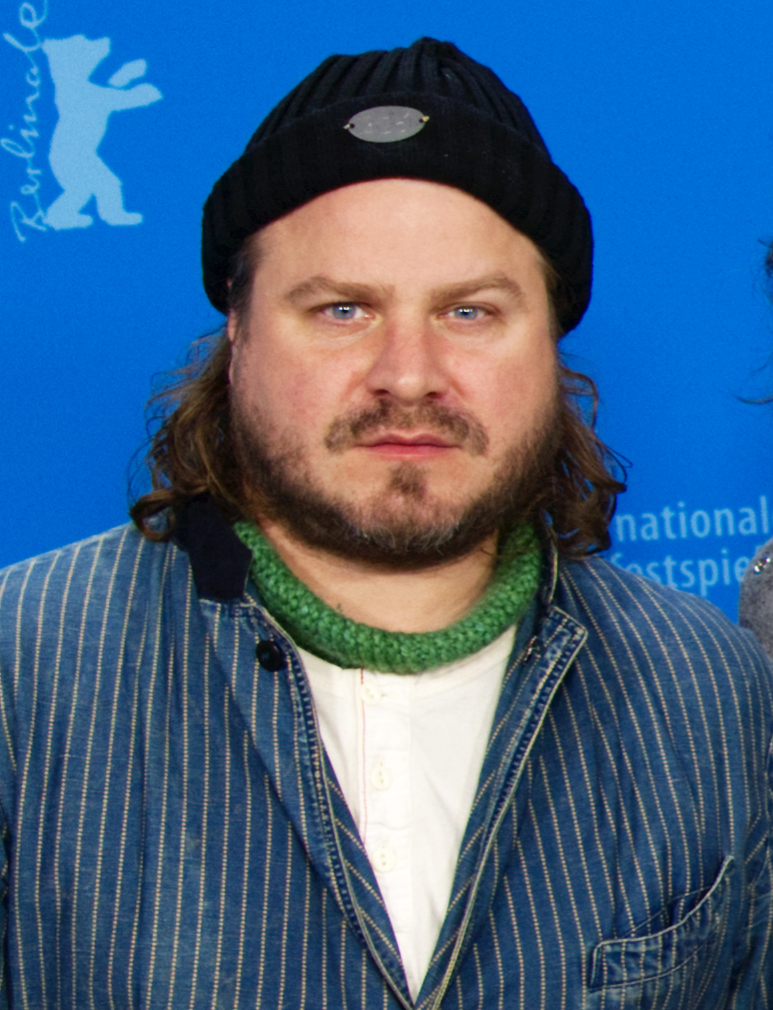
- Corbet at the 2024 Berlinale
- Born: August 17, 1988 (age 38); Scottsdale, Arizona, U.S.
- Occupations: Filmmaker; actor
- Years active: 2000–present
- Partner(s): Mona Fastvold (2013–present)
- Children: 1

Brady James Monson Corbet (/kɔːrˈbeɪ/ kor-BAY; born August 17, 1988) is an American filmmaker and former actor. Since retiring from acting in 2014 to pursue his filmmaking career with his partner Mona Fastvold, Corbet made his directorial debut with the psychological drama The Childhood of a Leader (2015). He has since co-written and directed the musical drama Vox Lux (2018) and the period epic The Brutalist (2024). The latter earned him the Silver Lion, BAFTA, and Golden Globe for Best Director as well as three Academy Award nominations for Best Picture, Director, and Original Screenplay.

As an actor, he had roles in films such as Thirteen (2003), Mysterious Skin (2004), Funny Games (2007), Martha Marcy May Marlene (2011), Melancholia (2011), and Clouds of Sils Maria (2014), as well as the series 24 (2006) and Olive Kitteridge (2014).

== Early life ==
Brady James Monson Corbet was born in Scottsdale, Arizona, on August 17, 1988. He was raised by a single mother, whom he regards as the closest thing he has to "a hero". On his mother's side, he has Irish, Serbian (from Apatin), and Ashkenazi Jewish ancestry; he attended Catholic school.

== Career ==
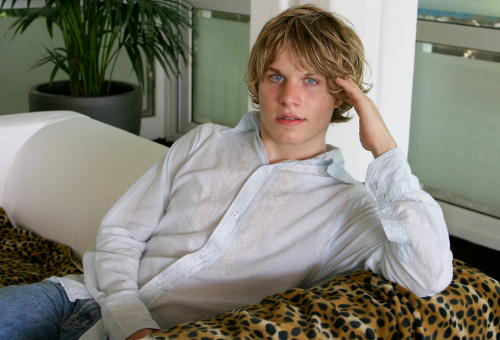
Corbet in September 2004

Corbet began an acting career at age eleven with a guest role in an April 2000 episode of CBS' The King of Queens, and he followed it up with voice work in the English version of the animated Japanese series NieA under 7. Over the next few years he was a regular on another animated series, I My Me! Strawberry Eggs (2001), and he guest-starred in a May 2002 episode of the WB sitcom Greetings from Tucson. He also appeared in a May 2003 episode of Fox's sitcom Oliver Beene. In 2003 he landed his first film role when he was cast in Thirteen.

In 2004 Corbet starred as the youngest son of a billionaire ex-astronaut in Thunderbirds, Jonathan Frakes' live-action movie based on the 1960s British T.V. series. Later that same year, Gregg Araki cast him in Mysterious Skin, based on the 1996 novel of the same name by Scott Heim; Corbet portrayed a troubled teenager who is plagued by nightmares and believes that he may have been abducted by aliens. The film debuted in that year's Venice Film Festival and had a limited release in 2005.

In 2006, Corbet returned to television with a recurring role as the son of Jack Bauer's new girlfriend in the fifth season of 24. He also appeared in the independent rock band Bright Eyes' music video "At the Bottom of Everything" (2005). In October 2006, he was featured in the Ima Robot video for "Lovers in Captivity", which was produced independently of their Virgin Records label and was featured in an Out Magazine article. He played the role of Watts in the 2011 psychological thriller Martha Marcy May Marlene.

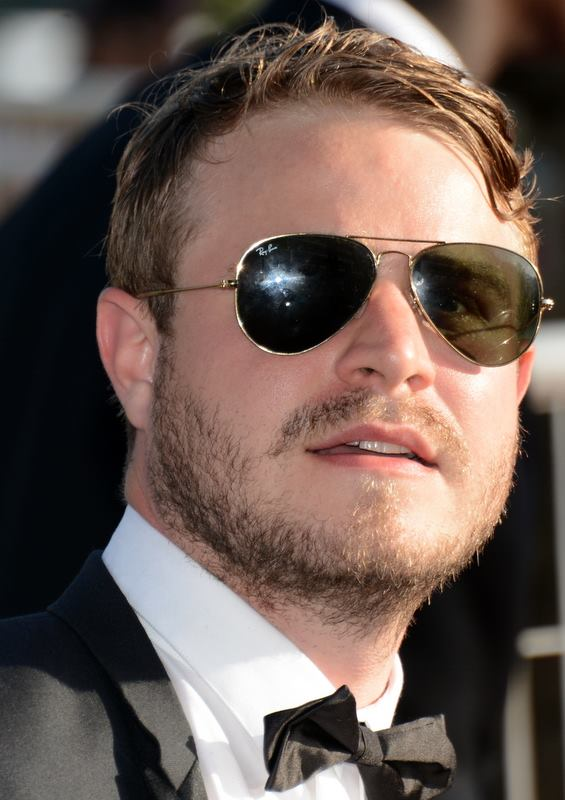
Corbet in May 2014

In 2013, Corbet signed to direct his first feature film, The Childhood of a Leader. It premiered in the Horizons section of the 72nd Venice International Film Festival, where he won Best Director in the festival's Horizons (Orizzonti) section. In 2018, Corbet directed his second feature film Vox Lux.

In September 2020, it was reported that Corbet would direct his third feature film, the immigrant drama The Brutalist. The film was released in 2024 to critical acclaim and earned ten nominations at the 97th Academy Awards, including Best Director and Best Original Screenplay. He also won the Silver Lion at the 81st Venice International Film Festival and Best Director at the 82nd Golden Globe Awards.

In November 2025, Corbet revealed that his next film would be an "X-rated movie" that takes place "mostly in the 1970s", adding that the film would span from the 19th century to the present day, stating that it will be about the economy of northern California. The project is expected to begin filming in summer 2026.

== Personal life ==
Since 2013, Corbet has been in a relationship with Norwegian filmmaker and actress Mona Fastvold. They have a daughter born in 2014.

Fastvold and Corbet met by being introduced by their mutual friend, actor Christopher Abbott, who is now their daughter’s godfather. After meeting, they became friends and began co-writing films. They then became a couple after finishing the first film they wrote together, The Sleepwalker.

== Filmography ==
=== Film ===
Year	Title	Director	Writer	Producer	Notes
2008	Protect You + Me.	Yes	Yes	No	Short film
2012	Simon Killer	No	Story	No	Written with Antonio Campos and Mati Diop
2014	The Sleepwalker	No	Yes	No	Written with Mona Fastvold
2015	The Childhood of a Leader	Yes	Yes	Yes	Written with Mona Fastvold
2018	Vox Lux	Yes	Yes	No	Written with Mona Fastvold
2019	30/30 Vision: 3 Decades of Strand Releasing	Yes	Yes	No	Anthology film; segment "The Day the 'Conducator' Died"
2024	The Brutalist	Yes	Yes	Yes	Written with Mona Fastvold
2025	The Testament of Ann Lee	No	Yes	Yes	Written with Mona Fastvold
TBA	The Origin of the World	Yes	Yes	No	Filming

==== Acting ====
Year	Title	Role	Notes
2003	Thirteen	Mason Freeland	
2004	Mysterious Skin	Brian Lackey	
2004	Thunderbirds	Alan Tracy	
2007	Funny Games	Peter	
2010	Two Gates of Sleep	Jack	Also editor (with Alistair Banks Griffin)
2011	Martha Marcy May Marlene	Watts	
2011	Melancholia	Tim	
2012	Simon Killer	Simon	
2014	Clouds of Sils Maria	Piers Roaldson	
2014	Eden	Larry	
2014	Force Majeure	Brady	
2014	Saint Laurent	David	
2014	The Sleepwalker	Ira	
2014	While We're Young	Kent Arlington	
2014	Escobar: Paradise Lost	Dylan Brady	
2014	Portrait of the Artist	Spectator	Uncredited
2014	Yellowbird	Willy (voice)	English dub

=== Television ===
Year	Title	Director	Writer	Producer	Notes
2020	Homemade	No	Yes	No	Episode: "Annex"
2023	The Crowded Room	Yes	No	Executive	3 episodes

==== Acting ====
Year	Title	Role	Notes
2000	The King of Queens	Stu	Episode: "Big Dougie"
2000	NieA under 7	Additional voices	English dub 4 episodes
2001	I My Me! Strawberry Eggs	Yoshihiko Nishinada	English dub Episode: "Rebellious Eyelash Curler Boys"
2003	Oliver Beene	Spencer	Episode: "Oliver's Best Friend"
2003	Greetings from Tucson	Brian	Episode: "Eegee's vs. Hardee's"
2006	24	Derek Huxley	6 episodes
2008	Law & Order	Patrick Friendly	Episode: "Lost Boys"
2010	Law & Order: Special Victims Unit	Henry Christensen	Episode: "Quickie"
2014	Olive Kitteridge	Henry Thibodeau	Miniseries

== Awards and nominations ==
Year	Award	Category	Work	Result	Ref.
2008	Young Hollywood Awards	One to Watch - Male	Funny Games	Won	
2009	Sundance Film Festival	Short Filmmaking Award - Honorable Mention	Protect You + Me	Won	
2011	Gotham Awards	Best Ensemble Performance	Martha Marcy May Marlene	Nominated	
2012	RiverRun International Film Festival	Special Jury Prize - Spark Award (shared with David Oyelowo and Amy Seimetz)		Won	
2016	East End Film Festival	Best Film	The Childhood of a Leader	Nominated	
2015	Venice International Film Festival	Luigi De Laurentiis Award for a Debut Film	The Childhood of a Leader	Won	
2015	Venice International Film Festival	Orizzonti Award for Best Director	The Childhood of a Leader	Won	
2018	Venice International Film Festival	Golden Lion	Vox Lux	Nominated	
2024	Venice International Film Festival	Golden Lion	The Brutalist	Nominated	
2024	Venice International Film Festival	Silver Lion	The Brutalist	Won	
2024	Washington D.C. Area Film Critics Association	Best Director	The Brutalist	Won	
2024	Washington D.C. Area Film Critics Association	Best Original Screenplay	The Brutalist	Nominated	
2024	The Astra Awards	Best Director	The Brutalist	Nominated	
2024	The Astra Awards	Best Original Screenplay	The Brutalist	Nominated	
2024	San Diego Film Critics Society	Best Director	The Brutalist	Nominated	
2024	Chicago Film Critics Association	Best Director	The Brutalist	Nominated	
2024	Chicago Film Critics Association	Best Original Screenplay	The Brutalist	Nominated	
2024	Las Vegas Film Critics Society	Best Director	The Brutalist	Nominated	
2024	Las Vegas Film Critics Society	Best Screenplay Original	The Brutalist	Won	
2024	Boston Online Film Critics Association	Best Director	The Brutalist	Won	
2024	St. Louis Film Critics Association	Best Director	The Brutalist	Nominated	
2024	St. Louis Film Critics Association	Best Original Screenplay	The Brutalist	Nominated	
2024	San Francisco Bay Area Film Critics Circle	Best Director	The Brutalist	Won	
2024	San Francisco Bay Area Film Critics Circle	Best Original Screenplay	The Brutalist	Nominated	
2024	New York Film Critics Online	Director	The Brutalist	Runner-up	
2024	New York Film Critics Online	Screenplay	The Brutalist	Won	
2024	Seattle Film Critics Society	Best Director	The Brutalist	Nominated	
2024	Seattle Film Critics Society	Best Screenplay	The Brutalist	Nominated	
2024	Southeastern Film Critics Association	Best Director	The Brutalist	Won	
2024	Southeastern Film Critics Association	Best Original Screenplay	The Brutalist	Runner-up	
2024	Dallas–Fort Worth Film Critics Association	Best Director	The Brutalist	Nominated	
2024	Dallas–Fort Worth Film Critics Association	Best Screenplay	The Brutalist	Won	
2025	Kansas City Film Critics Circle	Best Original Screenplay	The Brutalist	Nominated	
2025	Golden Globe Awards	Best Director	The Brutalist	Won	
2025	Golden Globe Awards	Best Screenplay	The Brutalist	Nominated	
2025	Austin Film Critics Association	Best Director	The Brutalist	Nominated	
2025	Austin Film Critics Association	Best Original Screenplay	The Brutalist	Nominated	
2025	Georgia Film Critics Association	Best Director	The Brutalist	Runner-up	
2025	Georgia Film Critics Association	Best Original Screenplay	The Brutalist	Runner-up	
2025	Alliance of Women Film Journalists	Best Director	The Brutalist	Nominated	
2025	Alliance of Women Film Journalists	Best Screenplay, Original	The Brutalist	Nominated	
2025	Houston Film Critics Society	Best Director	The Brutalist	Won	
2025	Houston Film Critics Society	Best Screenplay	The Brutalist	Nominated	
2025	Satellite Awards	Best Director	The Brutalist	Won	
2025	Satellite Awards	Best Original Screenplay	The Brutalist	Nominated	
2025	Online Film Critics Society	Best Director	The Brutalist	Nominated	
2025	Online Film Critics Society	Best Original Screenplay	The Brutalist	Nominated	
2025	London Film Critics' Circle	Director of the Year	The Brutalist	Nominated	
2025	London Film Critics' Circle	Screenwriter of the Year	The Brutalist	Nominated	
2025	Critics' Choice Movie Awards	Best Director	The Brutalist	Nominated	
2025	Critics' Choice Movie Awards	Best Original Screenplay	The Brutalist	Nominated	
2025	Directors Guild of America Awards	Feature Film	The Brutalist	Nominated	
2025	International Cinephile Society	Best Director	The Brutalist	Nominated	
2025	AACTA Awards	Best Direction	The Brutalist	Nominated	
2025	AACTA Awards	Best Screenplay	The Brutalist	Nominated	
2025	Dorian Awards	Director of the Year	The Brutalist	Nominated	
2025	British Academy Film Awards	Best Film	The Brutalist	Nominated	
2025	British Academy Film Awards	Best Director	The Brutalist	Won	
2025	British Academy Film Awards	Best Original Screenplay	The Brutalist	Nominated	
2025	Independent Spirit Awards	Best Director	The Brutalist	Nominated	
2025	Academy Awards	Best Picture	The Brutalist	Nominated	
2025	Academy Awards	Best Director	The Brutalist	Nominated	
2025	Academy Awards	Best Original Screenplay	The Brutalist	Nominated	

Directed Academy Award performances
Under Corbet's direction, these actors have received Academy Award nominations (and one win) for their performances in their respective roles.

Year	Performer	Film	Result
Academy Award for Best Actor
2024	Adrien Brody	The Brutalist	Won
Academy Award for Best Supporting Actor
2024	Guy Pearce	The Brutalist	Nominated
Academy Award for Best Supporting Actress
2024	Felicity Jones	The Brutalist	Nominated
