= List of accolades received by Licorice Pizza =

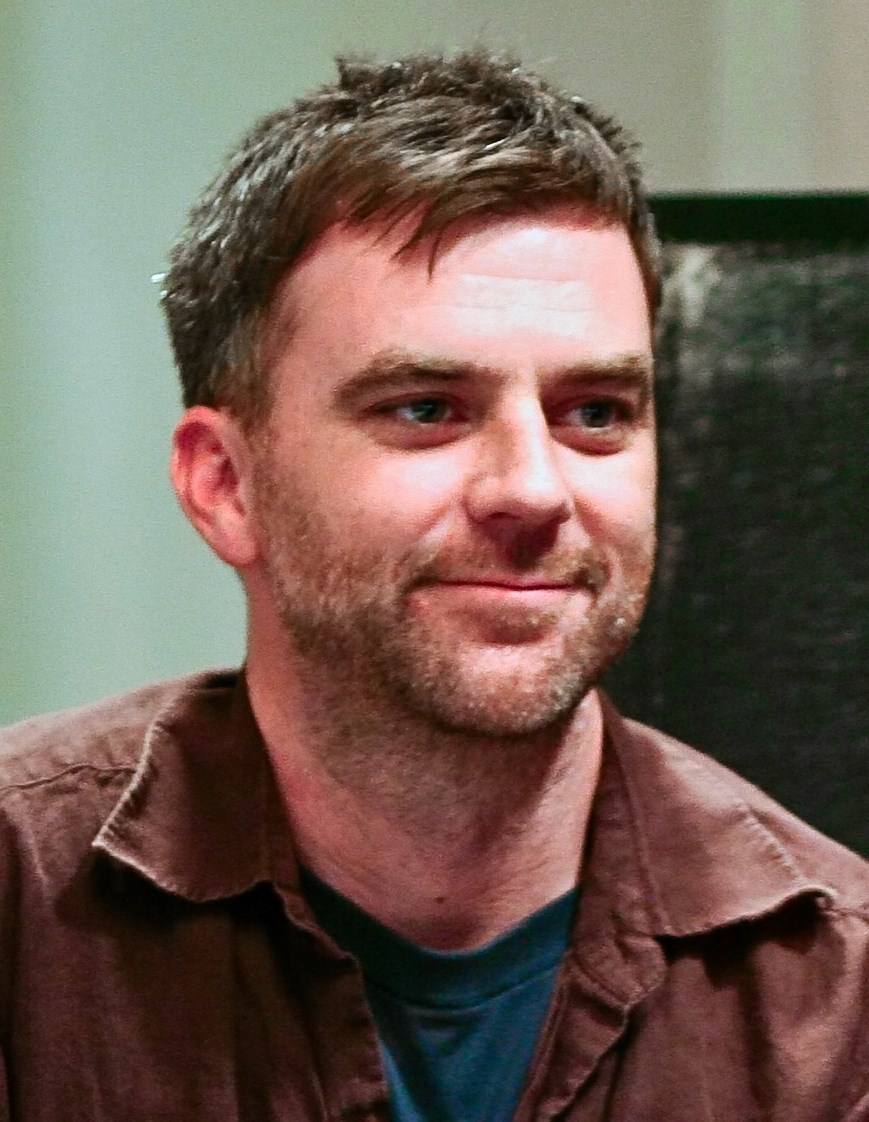
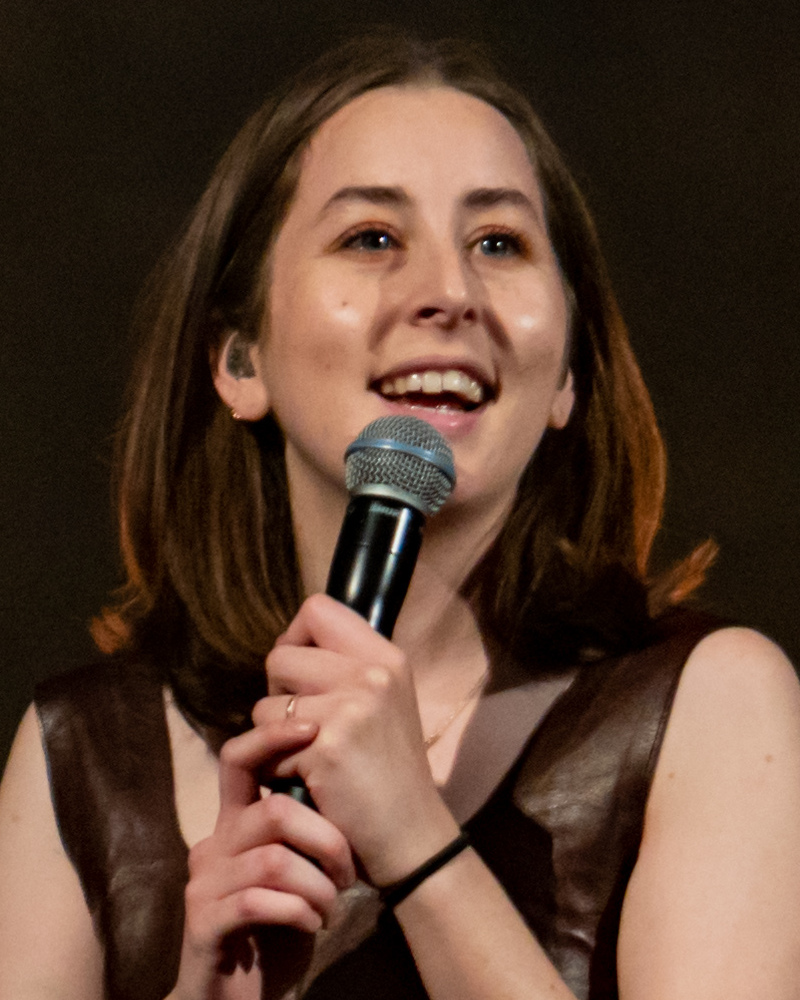
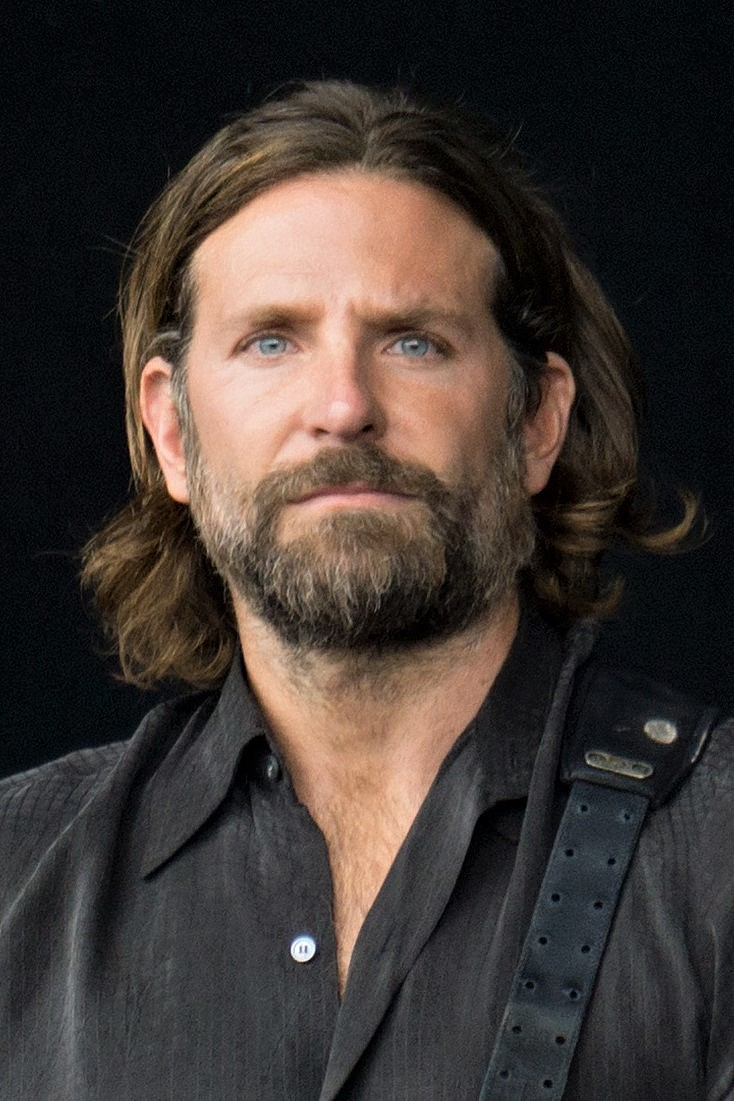
- Paul Thomas Anderson (left) received critical acclaim for his screenplay and direction, and Alana Haim (center) and Bradley Cooper (right) for their performances in the film.
Accolades
Award	Wins	Nominations
AACTA International Awards	0	4
AARP Movies for Grownups Awards	0	2
Academy Awards	0	3
Alliance of Women Film Journalists	1	4
ACE Eddie Awards	0	1
American Film Institute Awards	1	1
Art Directors Guild Awards	0	1
Austin Film Critics Association	1	8
Boston Society of Film Critics	2	2
British Academy Film Awards	1	5
Chicago Film Critics Association	2	6
Chlotrudis Awards	0	2
Critics' Choice Awards	1	8
Dallas–Fort Worth Film Critics Association	3	3
Detroit Film Critics Society	0	3
Directors Guild of America Awards	0	1
Florida Film Critics Circle	3	4
Georgia Film Critics Association	6	8
Gold Derby Awards	2	3
Golden Globe Awards	0	4
Hollywood Critics Association	0	1
Houston Film Critics Society	0	4
London Film Critics Circle	0	2
Los Angeles Film Critics Association	2	2
National Board of Review	3	3
National Society of Film Critics	2	2
New York Film Critics Circle	1	1
New York Film Critics Online	1	1
Online Film Critics Society	0	5
Producers Guild of America Awards	0	1
San Diego Film Critics Society	1	2
San Francisco Bay Area Film Critics Circle	0	4
Satellite Awards	1	5
Screen Actors Guild Awards	0	1
Seattle Film Critics Society	0	4
Set Decorators Society of America Awards	0	1
St. Louis Film Critics Association	3	9
Toronto Film Critics Association	3	3
Washington D.C. Area Film Critics Association	0	1
Writers Guild of America Awards	0	1

Totals (Note: Certain award groups do not simply award one winner. They acknowledge several different recipients, have runners-up, and have third place. Since this is a specific recognition and is different from losing an award, runner-up mentions are considered wins in this award tally. For simplification and to avoid errors, each award in this list has been presumed to have had a prior nomination.)
- Wins: 39
- Nominations: 126

Licorice Pizza is a 2021 American coming-of-age comedy-drama film written and directed by Paul Thomas Anderson, who also serves as one of the film's producers and cinematographers. The film stars Alana Haim and Cooper Hoffman in their film debuts, Sean Penn, Tom Waits, Bradley Cooper, and Benny Safdie.

The film was released in the United States in select theaters on November 26, 2021, and was widely released on December 25, 2021.

Licorice Pizza received universal critical acclaim for Anderson's screenplay and direction, Jurgensen's editing and the performances of Haim and Cooper. It was selected by the American Film Institute as one of its ten Movies of the Year. National Board of Review named the film the Best Film of the Year, with Anderson winning Best Director. The film garnered three nominations at the 94th Academy Awards, including Best Picture, and four nominations at the 79th Golden Globe Awards including Best Motion Picture – Musical or Comedy, Best Actress – Motion Picture Musical or Comedy for Haim and Best Director. At the 28th Screen Actors Guild Awards Cooper was nominated for Outstanding Performance by a Male Actor in a Supporting Role. It received eight nominations at the 27th Critics' Choice Awards including Best Picture, Best Director, Best Actress, Best Original Screenplay and Best Editing, where it won Best Comedy, as well as five nominations at the 75th British Academy Film Awards including Best Film, Best Direction, Best Actress in a Leading Role and Best Original Screenplay, the latter of which it won. It is also MGM's first fully produced, marketed and distributed film to be nominated for Best Picture in 33 years, after 1988's Rain Man.

== Accolades ==
Award	Date of ceremony	Category	Recipient(s)	Result	Ref.
AACTA International Awards	January 26, 2022	Best Film	Licorice Pizza	Nominated	
AACTA International Awards	January 26, 2022	Best Direction	Paul Thomas Anderson	Nominated	
AACTA International Awards	January 26, 2022	Best Supporting Actor	Bradley Cooper	Nominated	
AACTA International Awards	January 26, 2022	Best Screenplay	Paul Thomas Anderson	Nominated	
AARP Movies for Grownups Awards	March 18, 2022	Best Screenwriter	Paul Thomas Anderson	Nominated	
AARP Movies for Grownups Awards	March 18, 2022	Best Time Capsule	Licorice Pizza	Nominated	
Academy Awards	March 27, 2022	Best Picture	Sara Murphy, Adam Somner, and Paul Thomas Anderson	Nominated	
Academy Awards	March 27, 2022	Best Director	Paul Thomas Anderson	Nominated	
Academy Awards	March 27, 2022	Best Original Screenplay	Paul Thomas Anderson	Nominated	
ACE Eddie Awards	March 5, 2022	Best Edited Feature Film – Comedy	Andy Jurgensen	Nominated	
Alliance of Women Film Journalists	January 25, 2022	Best Film	Licorice Pizza	Nominated	
Alliance of Women Film Journalists	January 25, 2022	Best Director	Paul Thomas Anderson	Nominated	
Alliance of Women Film Journalists	January 25, 2022	Best Screenplay, Original	Paul Thomas Anderson	Won	
Alliance of Women Film Journalists	January 25, 2022	Best Woman's Breakthrough Performance	Alana Haim	Nominated	
American Film Institute	January 7, 2022	Top 10 Movies of the Year	Licorice Pizza	Won	
Art Directors Guild Awards	March 5, 2022	Excellence in Production Design for a Period Film	Florencia Martin	Nominated	
Austin Film Critics Association	January 11, 2022	Best Film	Licorice Pizza	Nominated	
Austin Film Critics Association	January 11, 2022	Best Director	Paul Thomas Anderson	Nominated	
Austin Film Critics Association	January 11, 2022	Best Actress	Alana Haim	Nominated	
Austin Film Critics Association	January 11, 2022	Best Supporting Actor	Bradley Cooper	Nominated	
Austin Film Critics Association	January 11, 2022	Best Original Screenplay	Paul Thomas Anderson	Nominated	
Austin Film Critics Association	January 11, 2022	Best Film Editing	Andy Jurgensen	Nominated	
Austin Film Critics Association	January 11, 2022	Best Ensemble	The cast of Licorice Pizza	Nominated	
Austin Film Critics Association	January 11, 2022	The Robert R. "Bobby" McCurdy Memorial Breakthrough Artist Award	Alana Haim	Won	
Boston Society of Film Critics	December 12, 2021	Best Actress	Alana Haim	Won	
Boston Society of Film Critics	December 12, 2021	Best Ensemble	The cast of Licorice Pizza	Won	
British Academy Film Awards	March 13, 2022	Best Film	Sara Murphy, Paul Thomas Anderson and Adam Somner	Nominated	
British Academy Film Awards	March 13, 2022	Best Direction	Paul Thomas Anderson	Nominated	
British Academy Film Awards	March 13, 2022	Best Actress in a Leading Role	Alana Haim	Nominated	
British Academy Film Awards	March 13, 2022	Best Original Screenplay	Paul Thomas Anderson	Won	
British Academy Film Awards	March 13, 2022	Best Editing	Andy Jurgensen	Nominated	
Chicago Film Critics Association	December 15, 2021	Best Film	Licorice Pizza	Nominated	
Chicago Film Critics Association	December 15, 2021	Best Director	Paul Thomas Anderson	Nominated	
Chicago Film Critics Association	December 15, 2021	Best Actress	Alana Haim	Nominated	
Chicago Film Critics Association	December 15, 2021	Best Supporting Actor	Bradley Cooper	Nominated	
Chicago Film Critics Association	December 15, 2021	Best Original Screenplay	Paul Thomas Anderson	Won	
Chicago Film Critics Association	December 15, 2021	Most Promising Performer	Alana Haim	Won	
Chlotrudis Awards	March 20, 2022	Best Actress	Alana Haim	Nominated	
Chlotrudis Awards	March 20, 2022	Best Use of Music in a Film	Jonny Greenwood, Linda Cohen	Nominated	
Critics' Choice Awards	March 13, 2022	Best Picture	Licorice Pizza	Nominated	
Critics' Choice Awards	March 13, 2022	Best Director	Paul Thomas Anderson	Nominated	
Critics' Choice Awards	March 13, 2022	Best Actress	Alana Haim	Nominated	
Critics' Choice Awards	March 13, 2022	Best Young Actor/Actress	Cooper Hoffman	Nominated	
Critics' Choice Awards	March 13, 2022	Best Acting Ensemble	The cast of Licorice Pizza	Nominated	
Critics' Choice Awards	March 13, 2022	Best Original Screenplay	Paul Thomas Anderson	Nominated	
Critics' Choice Awards	March 13, 2022	Best Editing	Andy Jurgensen	Nominated	
Critics' Choice Awards	March 13, 2022	Best Comedy	Licorice Pizza	Won	
Dallas–Fort Worth Film Critics Association	December 20, 2021	Best Picture	Licorice Pizza	5th Place	
Dallas–Fort Worth Film Critics Association	December 20, 2021	Best Director	Paul Thomas Anderson	5th Place	
Dallas–Fort Worth Film Critics Association	December 20, 2021	Best Screenplay	Paul Thomas Anderson	2nd Place	
Detroit Film Critics Society	December 6, 2021	Best Actress	Alana Haim	Nominated	
Detroit Film Critics Society	December 6, 2021	Best Breakthrough Performance	Alana Haim	Nominated	
Detroit Film Critics Society	December 6, 2021	Best Original Screenplay	Paul Thomas Anderson	Nominated	
Directors Guild of America Awards	March 12, 2022	Outstanding Directing – Feature Film	Paul Thomas Anderson	Nominated	
Florida Film Critics Circle	December 22, 2021	Best Actress	Alana Haim	Won	
Florida Film Critics Circle	December 22, 2021	Best Original Screenplay	Paul Thomas Anderson	Runner-up	
Florida Film Critics Circle	December 22, 2021	Best Ensemble	The cast of Licorice Pizza	Nominated	
Florida Film Critics Circle	December 22, 2021	Breakout Award	Cooper Hoffman	Won	
Georgia Film Critics Association	January 14, 2022	Best Picture	Licorice Pizza	Won	
Georgia Film Critics Association	January 14, 2022	Best Director	Paul Thomas Anderson	Nominated	
Georgia Film Critics Association	January 14, 2022	Best Actress	Alana Haim	Won	
Georgia Film Critics Association	January 14, 2022	Best Supporting Actor	Bradley Cooper	Won	
Georgia Film Critics Association	January 14, 2022	Best Original Screenplay	Paul Thomas Anderson	Won	
Georgia Film Critics Association	January 14, 2022	Best Ensemble	The cast of Licorice Pizza	Won	
Georgia Film Critics Association	January 14, 2022	Breakthrough Award	Alana Haim	Won	
Georgia Film Critics Association	January 14, 2022	Breakthrough Award	Cooper Hoffman	Nominated	
Gold Derby Awards	March 16, 2022	Best Picture	Licorice Pizza	Nominated	
Gold Derby Awards	March 16, 2022	Best Original Screenplay	Paul Thomas Anderson	Won	
Gold Derby Awards	March 16, 2022	Best Breakthrough Performer	Alana Haim	Won	
Golden Globe Awards	January 9, 2022	Best Motion Picture – Musical or Comedy	Licorice Pizza	Nominated	
Golden Globe Awards	January 9, 2022	Best Actor – Motion Picture Musical or Comedy	Cooper Hoffman	Nominated	
Golden Globe Awards	January 9, 2022	Best Actress – Motion Picture Comedy or Musical	Alana Haim	Nominated	
Golden Globe Awards	January 9, 2022	Best Screenplay	Paul Thomas Anderson	Nominated	
Hollywood Critics Association	January 8, 2022	Best Picture	Licorice Pizza	Nominated	
Houston Film Critics Society	January 19, 2022	Best Picture	Licorice Pizza	Nominated	
Houston Film Critics Society	January 19, 2022	Best Director	Paul Thomas Anderson	Nominated	
Houston Film Critics Society	January 19, 2022	Best Actress	Alana Haim	Nominated	
Houston Film Critics Society	January 19, 2022	Best Screenplay	Paul Thomas Anderson	Nominated	
London Film Critics Circle	February 6, 2022	Film of the Year	Licorice Pizza	Nominated	
London Film Critics Circle	February 6, 2022	Screenwriter of the Year	Paul Thomas Anderson	Nominated	
Los Angeles Film Critics Association	December 18, 2021	Best Screenplay	Paul Thomas Anderson	Runner-up	
Los Angeles Film Critics Association	December 18, 2021	Best Editing	Andy Jurgensen	Runner-up	
National Board of Review	December 3, 2021	Best Film	Licorice Pizza	Won	
National Board of Review	December 3, 2021	Best Director	Paul Thomas Anderson	Won	
National Board of Review	December 3, 2021	Best Breakthrough Performance	Alana Haim and Cooper Hoffman	Won	
National Society of Film Critics	January 8, 2022	Best Actress	Alana Haim	3rd Place	
National Society of Film Critics	January 8, 2022	Best Screenplay	Paul Thomas Anderson	3rd Place	
New York Film Critics Circle	December 3, 2021	Best Screenplay	Paul Thomas Anderson	Won	
New York Film Critics Online	December 12, 2021	Top 10 Films of 2021	Licorice Pizza	Won	
Online Film Critics Society	January 24, 2022	Best Picture	Licorice Pizza	Nominated	
Online Film Critics Society	January 24, 2022	Best Director	Paul Thomas Anderson	Nominated	
Online Film Critics Society	January 24, 2022	Best Actress	Alana Haim	Nominated	
Online Film Critics Society	January 24, 2022	Best Original Screenplay	Paul Thomas Anderson	Nominated	
Online Film Critics Society	January 24, 2022	Best Editing	Andy Jurgensen	Nominated	
Producers Guild of America Awards	March 19, 2022	Best Theatrical Motion Picture	Sara Murphy, Paul Thomas Anderson, Adam Somner	Nominated	
San Diego Film Critics Society	January 10, 2022	Best Breakthrough Artist	Alana Haim	Nominated	
San Diego Film Critics Society	January 10, 2022	Best Comedic Performance	Bradley Cooper	Won	
San Francisco Bay Area Film Critics Circle	January 10, 2022	Best Picture	Licorice Pizza	Nominated	
San Francisco Bay Area Film Critics Circle	January 10, 2022	Best Supporting Actor	Bradley Cooper	Nominated	
San Francisco Bay Area Film Critics Circle	January 10, 2022	Best Original Screenplay	Paul Thomas Anderson	Nominated	
San Francisco Bay Area Film Critics Circle	January 10, 2022	Best Film Editing	Andy Jurgensen	Nominated	
Satellite Awards	April 2, 2022	Best Motion Picture – Comedy or Musical	Licorice Pizza	Nominated	
Satellite Awards	April 2, 2022	Best Director	Paul Thomas Anderson	Nominated	
Satellite Awards	April 2, 2022	Best Actress in a Motion Picture – Comedy or Musical	Alana Haim	Won	
Satellite Awards	April 2, 2022	Best Original Screenplay	Paul Thomas Anderson	Nominated	
Satellite Awards	April 2, 2022	Best Film Editing	Andy Jurgensen	Nominated	
Screen Actors Guild Awards	February 27, 2022	Outstanding Performance by a Male Actor in a Supporting Role	Bradley Cooper	Nominated	
Seattle Film Critics Society	January 17, 2022	Best Picture	Licorice Pizza	Nominated	
Seattle Film Critics Society	January 17, 2022	Best Actress in a Leading Role	Alana Haim	Nominated	
Seattle Film Critics Society	January 17, 2022	Best Ensemble Cast	The cast of Licorice Pizza	Nominated	
Seattle Film Critics Society	January 17, 2022	Best Youth Performance	Cooper Hoffman	Nominated	
Set Decorators Society of America Awards	February 22, 2022	Best Achievement in Décor/Design of a Period Feature Film	Ryan Watson, Florencia Martin	Nominated	
St. Louis Film Critics Association	December 19, 2021	Best Film	Licorice Pizza	Won	
St. Louis Film Critics Association	December 19, 2021	Best Director	Paul Thomas Anderson	Nominated	
St. Louis Film Critics Association	December 19, 2021	Best Supporting Actor	Bradley Cooper	Nominated	
St. Louis Film Critics Association	December 19, 2021	Best Ensemble	The cast of Licorice Pizza	Nominated	
St. Louis Film Critics Association	December 19, 2021	Best Original Screenplay	Paul Thomas Anderson	Nominated	
St. Louis Film Critics Association	December 19, 2021	Best Editing	Andy Jurgensen	Nominated	
St. Louis Film Critics Association	December 19, 2021	Best Soundtrack	Licorice Pizza	Nominated	
St. Louis Film Critics Association	December 19, 2021	Best Comedy	Licorice Pizza	Won	
St. Louis Film Critics Association	December 19, 2021	Best Scene	"Truck driving in reverse"	Won	
Toronto Film Critics Association	January 16, 2022	Best Film	Licorice Pizza	Runner-up	
Toronto Film Critics Association	January 16, 2022	Best Supporting Actor	Bradley Cooper	Won	
Toronto Film Critics Association	January 16, 2022	Best Screenplay	Paul Thomas Anderson	Runner-up	
Vancouver Film Critics Circle	March 7, 2022	Best Supporting Actor	Bradley Cooper	Nominated	
Washington D.C. Area Film Critics Association	December 6, 2021	Best Original Screenplay	Paul Thomas Anderson	Nominated	
Writers Guild of America Awards	March 20, 2022	Best Original Screenplay	Paul Thomas Anderson	Nominated	

== See also ==
- 2021 in film
