= One Battle After Another =

2025 film by Paul Thomas Anderson

- Theatrical release poster
- Directed by: Paul Thomas Anderson
- Written by: Paul Thomas Anderson
- Based on: Vineland by Thomas Pynchon
- Produced by: Adam Somner; Sara Murphy; Paul Thomas Anderson
- Starring: Leonardo DiCaprio; Sean Penn; Benicio del Toro; Regina Hall; Teyana Taylor; Chase Infiniti
- Cinematography: Michael Bauman
- Edited by: Andy Jurgensen
- Music by: Jonny Greenwood
- Production companies: Warner Bros. Pictures; Ghoulardi Film Company
- Distributed by: Warner Bros. Pictures
- Release dates: September 8, 2025 (TCL Chinese Theatre); September 26, 2025 (United States)
- Running time: 162 minutes (Note: Attributed to multiple references:)
- Country: United States
- Language: English
- Budget: $130–175 million
- Box office: $213.2 million

One Battle After Another is a 2025 American action thriller film (Note: Attributed to multiple references:) written, directed, and produced by Paul Thomas Anderson. Inspired by the 1990 novel Vineland by Thomas Pynchon, the film's ensemble cast includes Leonardo DiCaprio, Sean Penn, Benicio del Toro, Regina Hall, Teyana Taylor, and Chase Infiniti, in her film debut. The film follows a drug-using washed-up former revolutionary who is thrust back into the conflict when an amoral tenacious counterterrorist agent resurfaces after sixteen years to bring them to justice to cover his past sins.

Anderson had wanted to adapt Vineland since the early 2000s, and eventually incorporated his own stories into the narrative while writing the screenplay. Principal photography took place in California from January to June 2024 using VistaVision, becoming one of the first films to use the format since the 1960s. Following its premiere on September 8, 2025, One Battle After Another was released in the United States by Warner Bros. Pictures on September 26. With a budget of $130–175 million, it is the most expensive film of Anderson's career and the highest-grossing at over $213 million worldwide.

One Battle After Another received acclaim and numerous accolades. At the 98th Academy Awards, it was nominated for 13 awards and won Best Picture, Best Director, Best Supporting Actor (Penn), Best Adapted Screenplay, Best Film Editing, and the inaugural Best Casting award. It also received one win from a record seven nominations at the 32nd Actor Awards; three wins at the 31st Critics' Choice Awards, including Best Picture; four wins at the 83rd Golden Globes, including Best Motion Picture – Musical or Comedy; and six wins at the 79th British Academy Film Awards, including Best Film. The film was listed by the American Film Institute as one of the top ten films of 2025 and won five awards from the National Board of Review, including Best Film.

== Plot ==
"Ghetto" Pat Calhoun and Perfidia Beverly Hills are lovers and members of a far-left militant revolutionary group, the French 75. While breaking out detained immigrants from Otay Mesa Detention Center, Perfidia sexually humiliates the commanding officer, Steven J. Lockjaw, who afterward becomes obsessed with her. Later, when Lockjaw catches Perfidia planting a bomb, he lets her go after she agrees to his demand to meet him for sex. Soon after, Perfidia becomes pregnant.

After Perfidia gives birth to a girl they name Charlene, Pat tries to persuade her to settle down, but she instead abandons Pat and Charlene to continue her revolutionary activities. Perfidia is arrested after murdering a security guard during a botched bank robbery. Lockjaw arranges for her to avoid prison in exchange for information on key French 75 members. Perfidia enters witness protection, while Lockjaw uses the information she provided to hunt down and summarily execute her comrades. French 75 member Howard Sommerville gives Pat and Charlene stolen identities as Bob and Willa Ferguson, while Perfidia flees witness protection for Mexico.

Sixteen years later, living off-the-grid in the sanctuary city of Baktan Cross, California, Bob has become a paranoid stoner. He is protective of Willa, now a teenager who resents Bob's substance abuse, and told her that her mother was a hero who died when she was a baby. Through his anti-immigration efforts, Lockjaw has become a colonel and a prominent figure within the U.S. security agencies. When Lockjaw is invited to become a member of the Christmas Adventurers Club, a white supremacist secret society, he seeks to kill Willa to hide his past interracial relationship with Perfidia. Lockjaw sends bounty hunter Avanti Q to capture Howard, who is able to transmit a distress signal to the French 75 before he is forced to reveal Bob and Willa's location.

Using an immigration and drug enforcement operation as cover, Lockjaw sends troops to Baktan Cross. French 75 member Deandra rescues Willa before her school dance is raided and takes her to a convent of revolutionary nuns, where she is told the truth about her mother's betrayal. Bob is warned by the French 75 of Lockjaw's imminent arrival. Escaping through a hidden tunnel, Bob is helped by Sergio St. Carlos, Willa's karate sensei and a community leader, who also evacuates immigrants via a hidden passage. After learning about the convent from another French 75 member, Bob flees with Sergio's students across rooftops, but falls and is arrested, then hospitalized without being recognized.

The Christmas Adventurers club find evidence of Lockjaw's scandalous relationship with Perfidia, and that Willa may be his child. Using the euphemism “clean”, they send member Tim Smith to kill Lockjaw and Willa. By tracing her phone, Lockjaw locates Willa at the convent, where Deandra is arrested. Holding Willa hostage, Lockjaw tests their DNA in front of her, confirming she is his biological daughter. Sergio arranges Bob's escape and drives him to the convent. When they are pursued by the police, Sergio diverts the police so Bob can escape. Bob reaches the convent, and fails to snipe Lockjaw with Sergio's rifle. Lockjaw hires Avanti to kill Willa, but Avanti refuses due to her age; he agrees instead to deliver her to a far-right militia.

Tim shoots Lockjaw as he is driving, causing Lockjaw to crash. While searching for Willa, Bob discovers Lockjaw's body at the crash site. Avanti brings Willa to the militia, but after a change of heart, frees her and is killed in a shootout with the militia. Willa escapes with Avanti's car and pistol with Tim in pursuit as Bob desperately tries to catch up. Willa lures Tim into a crash by exploiting a blind summit, shooting and killing him when he fails to respond with the revolutionary countersign. Bob finds Willa, who demands the countersign. Bob is able to talk her down, and they embrace.

Some time later, a severely scarred Lockjaw is seemingly welcomed into the Christmas Adventurers Club, but they fatally gas then cremate him instead. Returning home with Willa, Bob gives her a letter from Perfidia, in which she apologizes for her actions and vows to someday reunite with her family. Later, Bob gives Willa his blessing as she departs for a protest in Oakland.

== Cast ==
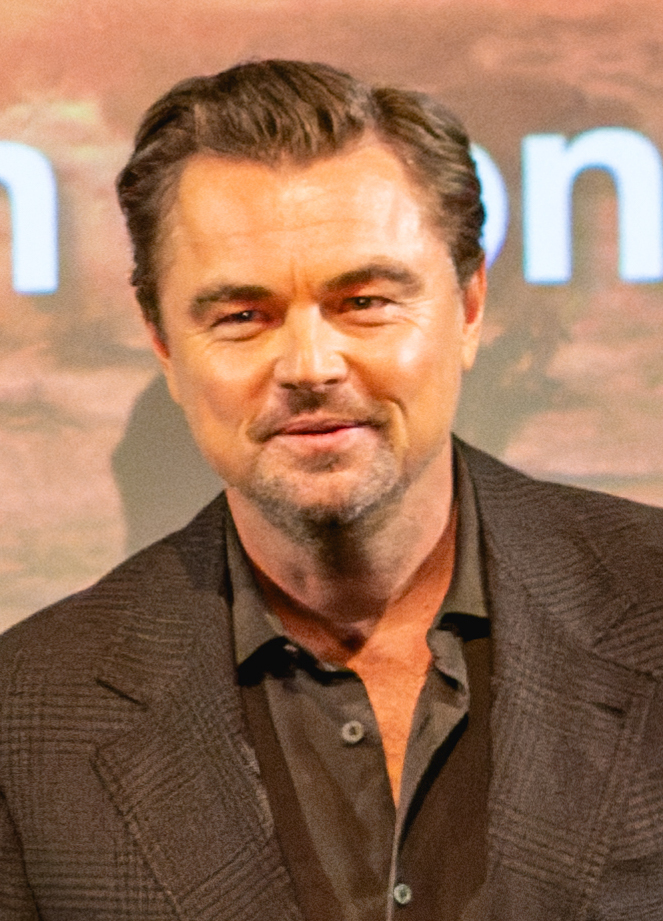
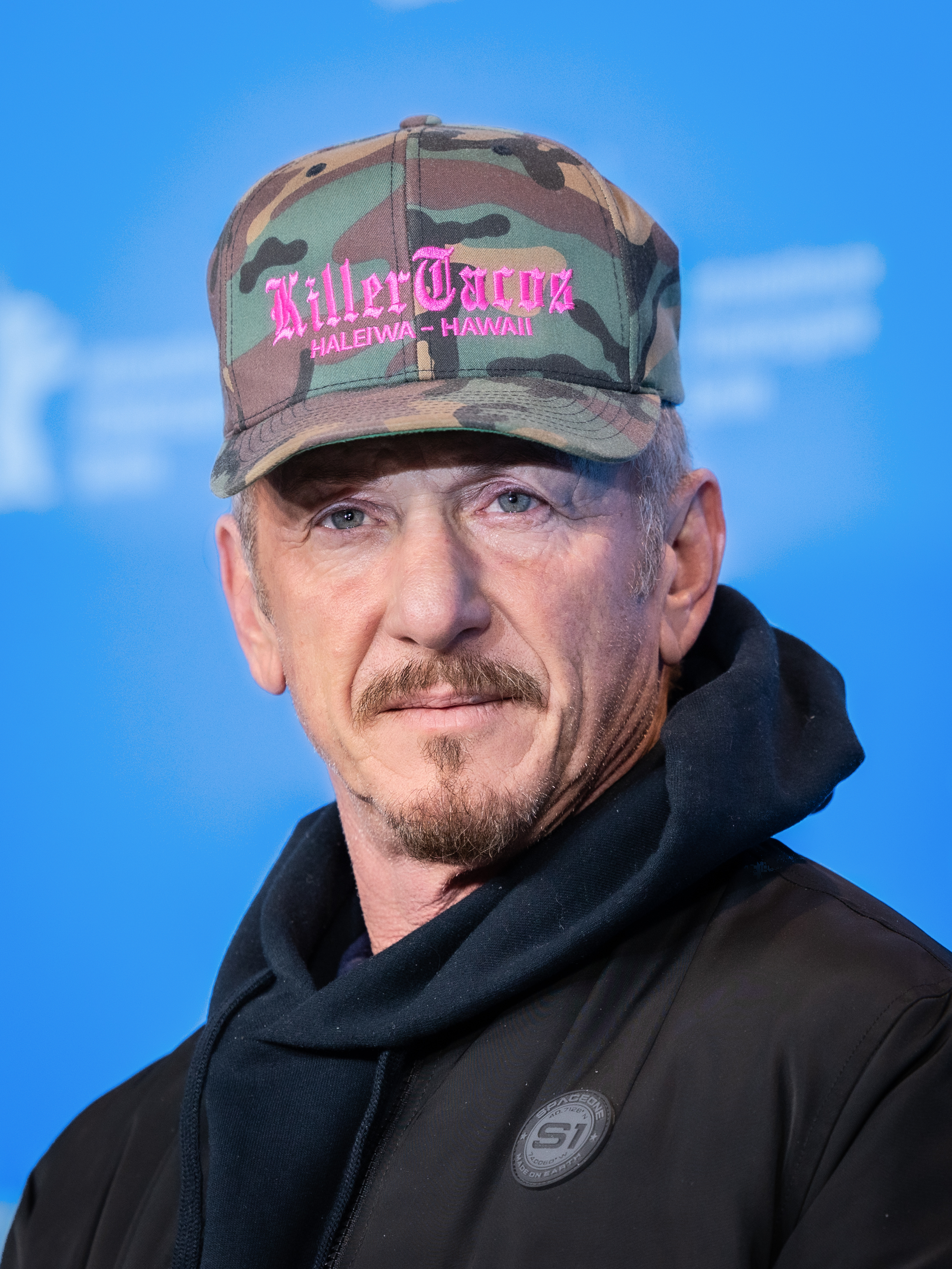
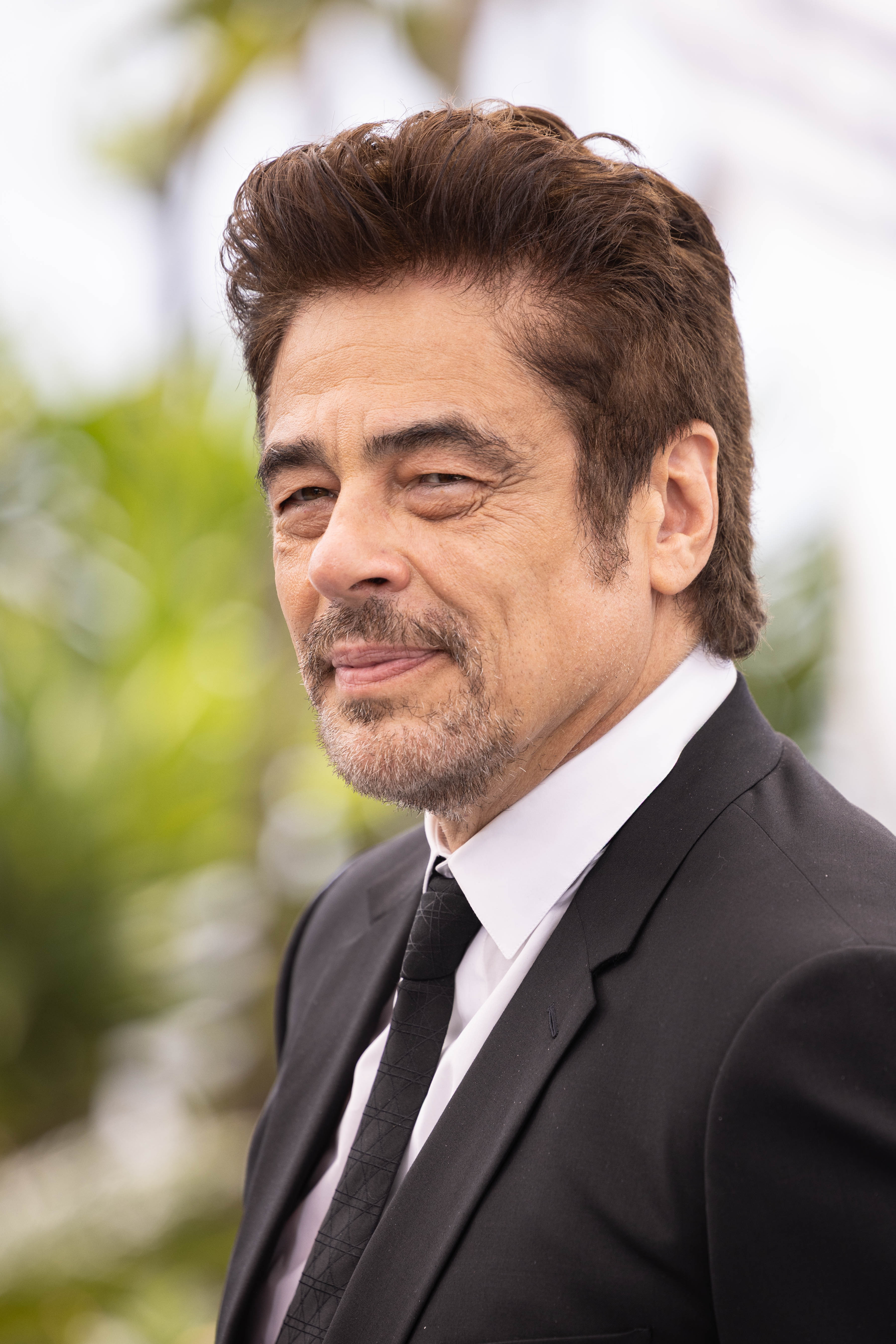
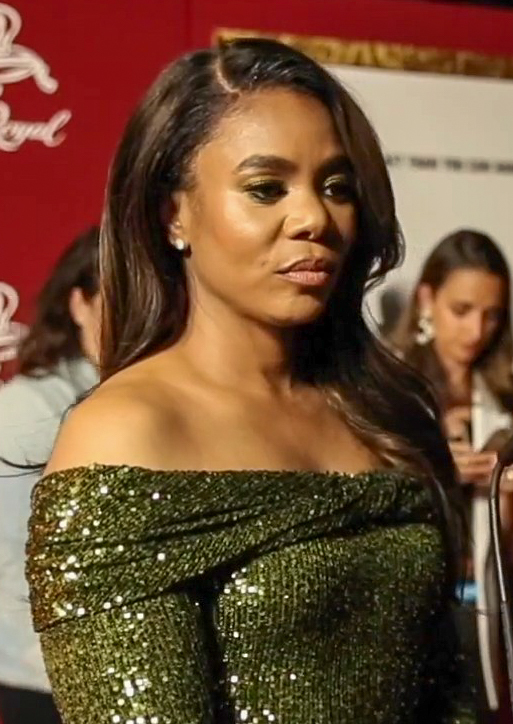
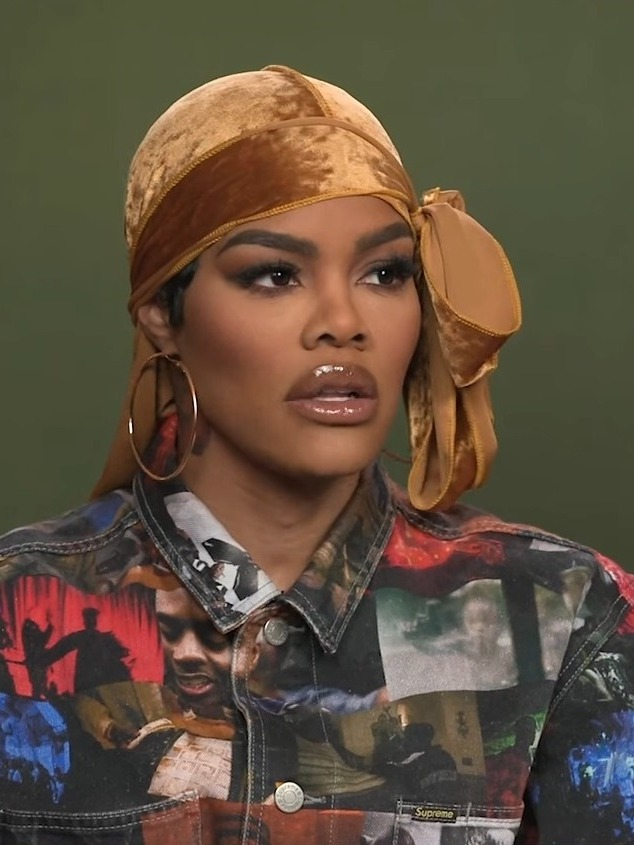
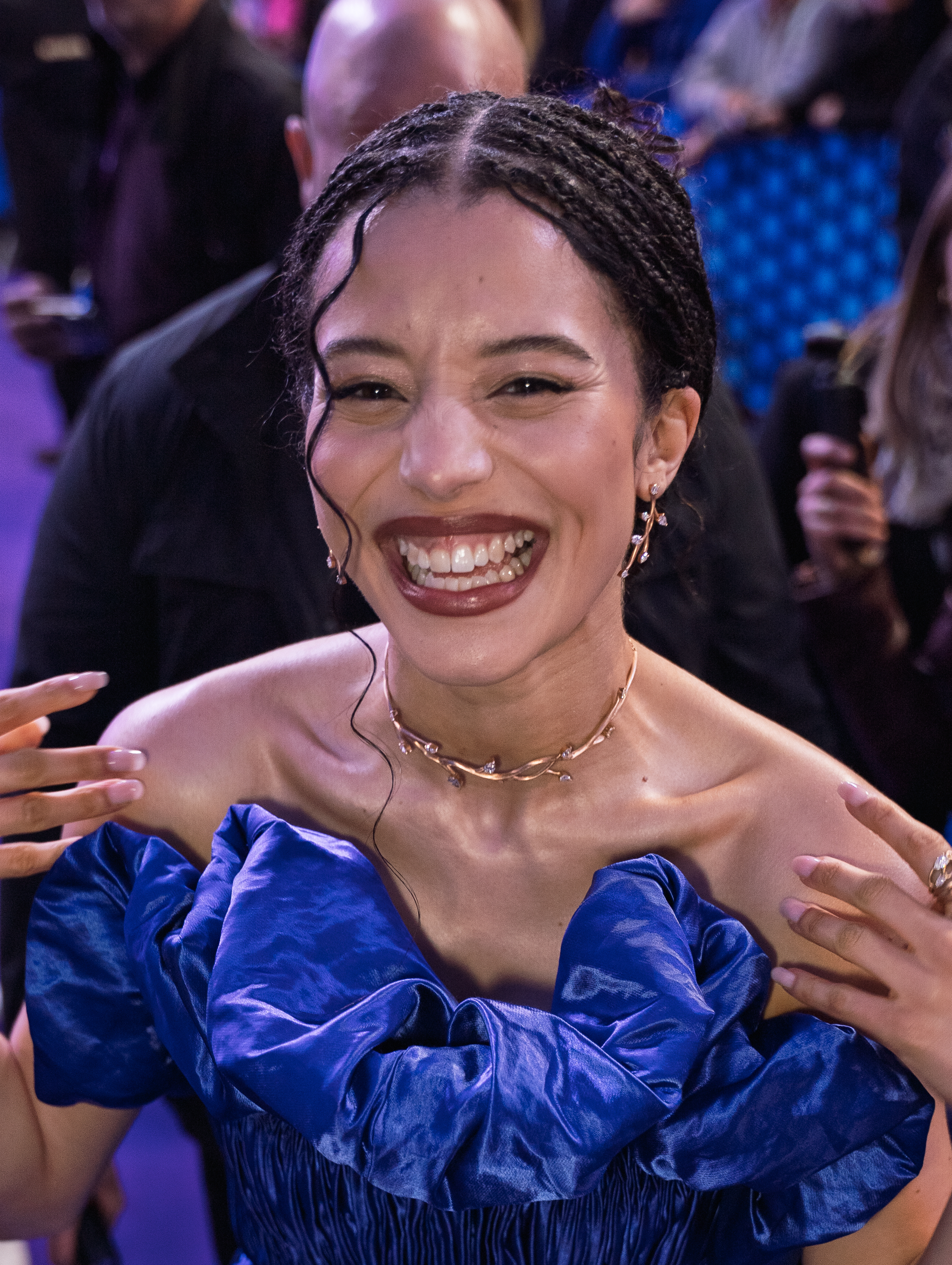
(Left to right; top-bottom) Leonardo DiCaprio, Sean Penn, Benicio del Toro, Regina Hall, Teyana Taylor, and Chase Infiniti
- Leonardo DiCaprio as "Ghetto" Pat Calhoun / "Rocketman" / Bob Ferguson, a washed-up former member and explosive device expert of a revolutionary group known as the French 75
- Sean Penn as Col. Steven J. Lockjaw, a corrupt military officer who pursues the French 75
- Benicio del Toro as Sergio St. Carlos, Willa's karate sensei and a leader of the undocumented community in Baktan Cross
- Regina Hall as Deandra / "Lady Champagne", a French 75 member
- Teyana Taylor as Perfidia Beverly Hills, a French 75 member; Willa's mother and Pat's lover
- Chase Infiniti as Willa Ferguson / Charlene Calhoun, Lockjaw and Perfidia's daughter
- Wood Harris as Laredo, a French 75 member
- Alana Haim as "Mae West", a French 75 member
- Paul Grimstad as Howard Sommerville / "Billy Goat" / "Gringo Coyote", a French 75 member
- Junglepussy as a fictionalized version of herself as a French 75 member
- Tony Goldwyn as Virgil Throckmorton, a member of the Christmas Adventurers Club, a secret, wealthy cabal of white supremacists
- John Hoogenakker as Tim Smith, a member of the Christmas Adventurers Club
- Starletta DuPois as Grandma Minnie, Perfidia's mother
- Eric Schweig as Avanti, a bounty hunter
- D. W. Moffett as Bill Desmond, a member of the Christmas Adventurers Club
- Kevin Tighe as Roy More, a member of the Christmas Adventurers Club
- Jim Downey as Sandy Irvine, a member of the Christmas Adventurers Club
- James Raterman as Colonel Danvers, Lockjaw's second-in-command
- Dijon Duenas as "Talleyrand", a French 75 member
- Dan Chariton as Comrade Josh, a French 75 member
- April Grace as Sister Rochelle, Mother Superior of the Sisters of the Brave Beaver
- Jon Beavers as 1776 James, a white nationalist gang member
- Tisha Sloan as Willa's teacher
- Jena Malone as the voice of the French 75 greeting code

== Production ==
=== Development ===
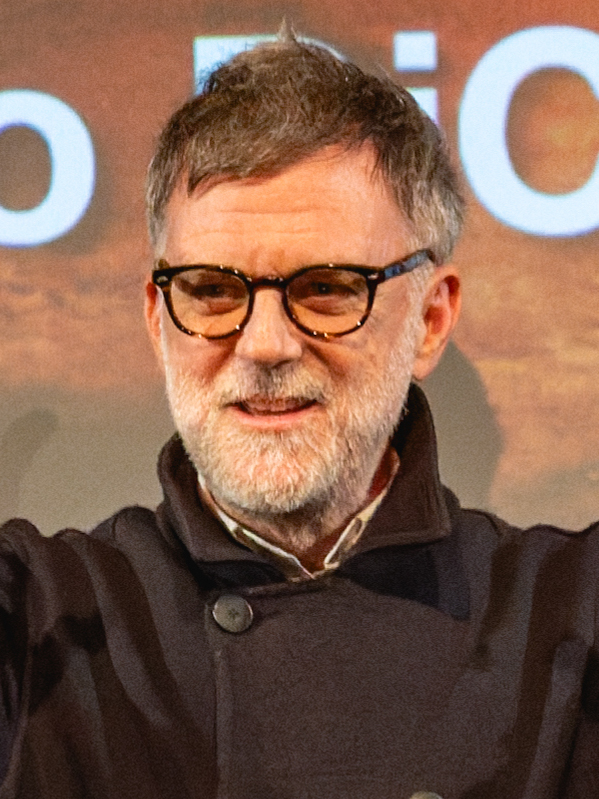
Writer and director Paul Thomas Anderson

Paul Thomas Anderson had considered adapting the 1990 novel Vineland by Thomas Pynchon since the early 2000s, but struggled, believing his love for the novel would get in the way of his ability to fairly rework it. Instead, Anderson set aside working on an adaptation and envisioned two ideas: one about an "action car-chase movie" and one about a "female revolutionary". One Battle After Another ultimately emerged as a combination of those two stories with some elements of Vineland, particularly the father-daughter dynamic.

=== Casting ===
In June 2023, Anderson's next film, rumored to star Leonardo DiCaprio, Regina Hall, Viggo Mortensen and Joaquin Phoenix, found its home at Warner Bros. Pictures. In January 2024, DiCaprio and Hall were confirmed to star, with Sean Penn joining the cast. DiCaprio reportedly received his standard $25 million fee for his involvement. In February, Alana Haim, Wood Harris, Chase Infiniti, Shayna McHayle, and Teyana Taylor joined the cast. The casting of Benicio del Toro was confirmed in June. Jacob Batalon revealed that he auditioned for the role of Comrade Josh.

To land the role of Willa Ferguson, the teenage daughter of the film's central character, Infiniti went through a six-month audition process involving multiple callbacks and camera tests as well as chemistry reads with DiCaprio and Hall. The reads were designed to gauge the rapport between the then-newcomer and her potential castmates, but, said Infiniti, "They felt like the coolest kind of masterclass. I remember leaving the room thinking, 'I would love this part, but even if I don't get it, I'll take that with me forever.'" Infiniti had also been a kickboxing trainer, but she still spent months training in both karate and mixed martial arts that tested her readiness to do her own stunts and handle some intense scenes with Penn. "With Willia [sic], it was anybody who's right", casting director Cassandra Kulukundis said of the broad criteria Anderson gave her, adding, "Doesn't matter if they've ever acted before, if they're a star, if I found them in school, if I find them on the street. That was a huge net – if you were between 12 and 25, I was looking at you." Kulukundis was able to narrow the search when she realized how important the physical demands of the part were to the performance. "The moment I saw [Infiniti] dancing, I don't know how to describe it. She's the most unique looking human being I've ever seen." For Kulukundis, Infiniti's ability to hold her own against DiCaprio was also vital. "We tried [DiCaprio] with a bunch of girls and he was really thoughtful and helpful, and we could see the chemistry with Chase. She just kept passing all the tests."

=== Filming ===
Principal photography began in California in January 2024. The film, under the working title BC Project, had filmed for eleven days across Humboldt County in Arcata, Cutten, Eureka, Kneeland, and Trinidad. (Note: Attributed to multiple references:) Local experts, including the Sisters of the Valley, on which the Sisters of the Brave Beaver in the film was based, were consulted. To make observations about music and fashion trends, Anderson and his crew attended the prom at Eureka High School; students were cast as extras for a key scene.

On February 3, production moved to Sacramento, with filming at the Sacramento County Administration Building and Sacramento County Courthouse. A homeless encampment was cleared to allow for filming, sparking controversy. The former Sacramento mansion of Governor Ronald Reagan was used for exterior shots for the Christmas Adventurers Club's headquarters, tying the film back into the original novel, with Pynchon's focus on Reagan.

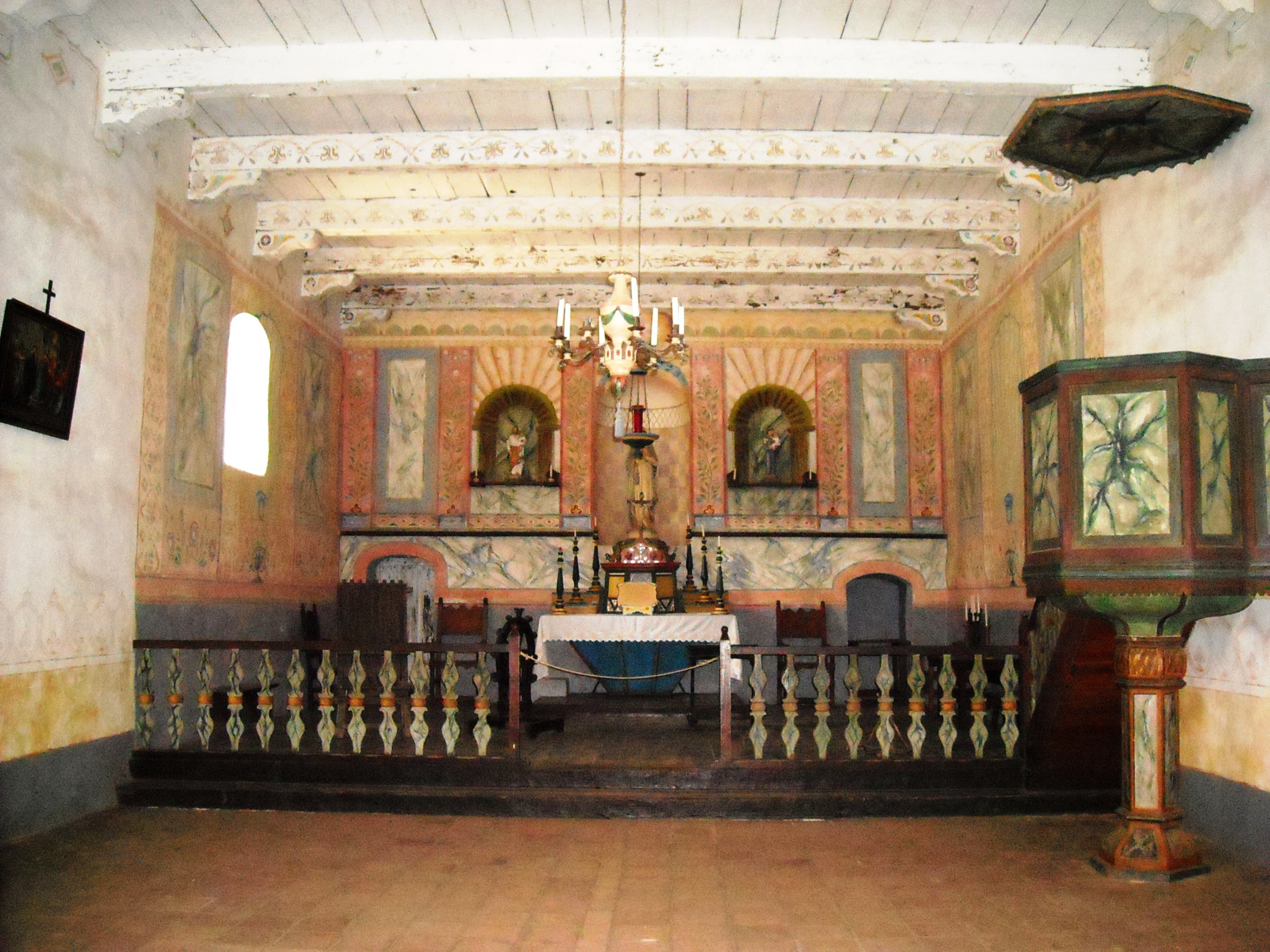
The DNA test scene was shot in the church at La Purísima Mission in Lompoc, California

The production took a two-and-a-half-month break from filming because del Toro had a scheduling conflict with Wes Anderson's The Phoenician Scheme (shot between March and June 2024). When del Toro arrived fresh off the set of The Phoenician Scheme, with ten days between projects, he stepped into a fast-moving production. "I had 10 days to unpack and pack", del Toro said of the 2024 shoot, adding, "Unpack my character in Wes' movie and then get dressed like Sensei and just go. You don't have time to adjust. If you want to jump on a carousel, you generally want time to run and catch up and then jump in. There was none of that."

On location filming also took place in Anza-Borrego Desert State Park and Borrego Springs in May 2024, and El Paso, Texas, including El Paso Streetcars, in June 2024. Other filming locations included La Purísima Mission, the Westgate Hotel, and the city of San Diego and Otay Mesa near the Mexico–United States border.

=== Cinematography ===
The film was shot by Michael Bauman on 35 mm movie film using VistaVision cameras, marking his third collaboration with Anderson, following Phantom Thread (2017) and Licorice Pizza (2021). (Note: Attributed to multiple references:) Between 75 and 80% of the film was shot on VistaVision. One Battle After Another is notable for utilizing VistaVision cameras; Brady Corbet's The Brutalist (2024) seemed to revive the high-resolution widescreen 35 mm format from the 1950s. "The question was more, 'Is this going to be a reliable enough format for us?' When you see the shots from The Brutalist, [DP] Lol Crawley has got the camera on a tripod. It's just sitting there and we weren't going to do anything like that", Bauman said, adding, "One Battle was always going to be about movement. It had to be handheld; it had to be on Steadicam; it had to be strapped to cars; it had to bounce around." Bauman described his experience shooting the film as "being on the knife's edge", mostly because it was shot on location instead of a sound stage.

Bauman revealed that Anderson wanted something in the "vein of '70s cinema", pointing to films like The French Connection (1971) and The Last Detail (1973), explaining that this "stylistic roughness" was "essential" for Anderson in telling the story. According to Bauman, VistaVision "was a response to television that some of the studios were developing. And instead of it being four-perf vertical, like a normal 35 millimeter camera, this takes the film and puts it eight-perf horizontal, which allows for a much bigger negative space. Each frame is twice the size. And so it's a much richer image." The format was ideal for capturing some of the action sequences in the film, particularly the final car chase sequence. Bauman further admitted that it was a challenge to figure out how to "blend the richness of VistaVision" to make One Battle After Another "look like a '70s type of film that felt like a lot of the scenes out of The French Connection". He pushed VistaVision to its limits, while using and testing it, saying, "This camera system hadn't really been used at this quantity of film because we shot about 1.5 million feet [460 kilometres] of film for the project [and] hadn't had that kind of level of film run through it in a long time [...] It really underscores the power of shooting on film and what VistaVision is as far as projecting it. It's really a super resting image that has a strong emotional feel to it. The ability to experience that by going to the theater is really unique."

Regarding the impact and location of the climactic car chase, Bauman said, "The sequence is really a testament to the location being the driving force. When Michael Glazier, the location manager, originally found it, he found it almost like by accident when he was driving after he found the location for the 1776 camp." To figure out how to capture the scene's "dynamic energy", Bauman and his team worked with Allan Padelford, a veteran stunt coordinator and second unit director best known for designing high-octane car-chase action sequences, and his Padelford Camera Car.

For the film's color and lighting, Bauman said both he and Anderson referred to the work of Hong Kong filmmaker Wong Kar-wai and The Silence of the Lambs (1991) as inspiration. Bauman also revealed that he and Anderson carried a print of The French Connection with them since they "were always screening film dailies", adding, "Sometimes it was just like, hey, it's time to have a little review, just to make sure your visual palette was in the same direction." Actor and cinematographer collector Giovanni Ribisi is thanked in the film's end credits for allowing production to use VistaVision cameras that he had personally restored.

=== Post-production ===
Editing was completed by Andy Jurgensen, who had previously edited Licorice Pizza. As a frequent collaborator of Anderson's, Jurgensen knew how to best be "fluid" in his work on the film to match his director's sensibilities. Discussing the final car chase sequence, Jurgensen said, "It was shot over a number of days and there really weren't storyboards for it, [Anderson] just had ideas for the beginning, middle, and end. It was really a matter of shooting the cars from the different perspectives [...] We just had to make sure we had all the pieces. I did a string out of all the different perspectives as we were shooting the scenes so that we made sure that we had good moments from all the angles, then it was finding the best bits and starting to assemble. It was just a long sequence going through all of Willa's shots of her eyes, looking at both the rear-view mirror and the side view mirror looking behind at the reflections. You're just slowly kind of whittling down the best fits." Jurgensen further explained that "it evolved to be what the final [edit] was" and that he was "still adding elements in the final mix", adding, "We went through many edits, but in the test screenings, it was always people's favorite part."

Additionally, Jurgensen was on location and got to view dailies with Anderson on a vintage VistaVision horizontal projector, which they borrowed from Warner Bros. "I was the only one traveling from editorial, and then I could supervise setting up the screening room and be there for all the screenings, which was really helpful", said Jurgensen. "And then while they were shooting, I also brought my computer system, getting digital dailies and making more notes, assembling stuff. You're with the crew and it's just so much better. You understand what everyone's going through and you're part of the process. But that's Paul's style."

In February 2024, Variety reported that the film had been greenlit with a $115 million production budget. In August 2024, The Wall Street Journal reported the budget was "more than $140 million", noting that Anderson's highest-grossing film, There Will Be Blood (2007), only made $76 million, but that "Warner executives say DiCaprio's box-office track record justifies the budget for Anderson". That month, sources indicated the film had been titled The Battle of Baktan Cross as rumors circulated that it was loosely inspired by Pynchon's Vineland; Anderson previously adapted Pynchon's Inherent Vice (2009) into a feature film in 2014.

By August 2025, Variety reported the film's final budget as $175 million, while Warner Bros. said it cost $130 million. The film is the most costly of Anderson's career. Deadline Hollywood reported that below-the-line, on location shooting in California cost $101.6 million, with a tax credit of $8.4 million. By September 2025, Variety reported that an additional $70 million was spent on marketing.

Beginning in January 2025, the film had multiple test screenings, which reinforced the rumored connection to Vineland. It marked the first time since Boogie Nights (1997) that Anderson agreed to audience testing; based on the feedback, he cut eight to ten minutes. There was also a report that Warner Bros. was working with Anderson to refine the film, but did not ask for radical changes. "We trimmed it down and that was just our normal process", Jurgensen said. According to Jurgensen, Anderson does not like to test his films, but it was something that Warner Bros. requested. Anderson partially agreed to the test screenings because he wanted to know if it played well as a comedy, and, as Jurgensen said, "There are some sensitive things in the movie, both racial things and political things. It was going to be interesting for us to test it in different parts of the country." Jurgensen also added that the tests confirmed that "the humor was working. And luckily, it did confirm, when you're kind of trying to figure out, 'How can we push it a little further? How can we do things?'" He further noted that the studio was not trying to enforce an ultimatum and did not pressure them to cut anything, saying, "They were supportive. I think the test screenings helped us because they were reacting so well to it."

The film's title was officially confirmed in March 2025, with Warner Bros. debuting a teaser trailer. One Battle After Another marked Anderson's sixth feature film collaboration with composer and Radiohead guitarist Jonny Greenwood, and the sixth with Anderson and first assistant director and producer Adam Somner, who died in November 2024; the film is dedicated to Somner. (Note: Attributed to multiple references:)

In February 2026, Variety reported that the awards campaign budget for the film was approximately $14 million.

=== Music ===
The score was composed by Jonny Greenwood, and recorded with the London Contemporary Orchestra and conductor Hugh Brunt. It was released by Nonesuch Records on September 26, 2025. The film also features two songs by Jon Brion, marking Anderson and Brion's first collaboration since Punch-Drunk Love (2002).

== Marketing ==
The marketing campaign for One Battle After Another cost $70 million. On March 27, 2025, DiCaprio launched his own YouTube channel with the debut of the teaser trailer. Extended footage of the film was shown during the Warner Bros. presentation at CinemaCon in April 2025. The second trailer for the film was released online on July 24, 2025. That same day, a video announcement, via the One Battle After Another Instagram account, announced the film was coming to Fortnite Creative on September 12. Additionally, posts on Twitter that applied meme templates to out-of-context clips from the film were released.

Multiple film critics and news outlets found the marketing to be "confusing" and "unusual". (Note: Attributed to multiple references:) Dana Nussbaum, Warner Bros. Pictures co-head of global motion picture marketing, defended this approach to promoting the film, stating, "Every campaign must be bespoke and you have to quickly shift based on what the audience is telling you", adding, "The audience moves really fast and you have to be moving at the same pace."

== Release ==
=== Theatrical ===
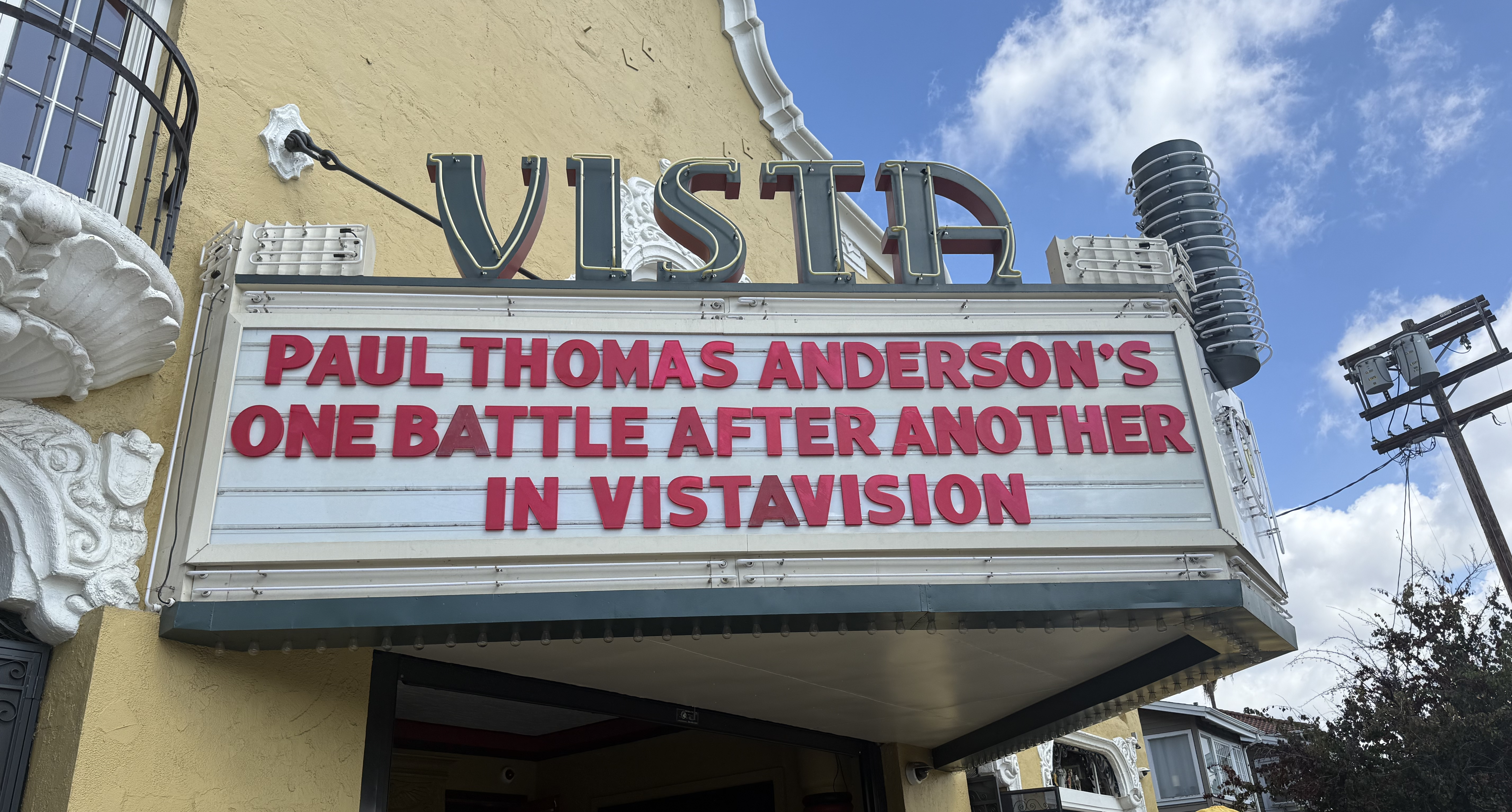
VistaVision presentation at Vista Theatre

The film was released on September 26, 2025, following previews on September 24. It is the first of Anderson's films to be released in IMAX. The film was previously set to be released on August 8, 2025, but was moved for a potential awards season campaign. It premiered at the TCL Chinese Theatre in Los Angeles on September 8, 2025, and had a global tour beginning in London on September 16, in Mexico City on September 18, and ending in New York City on September 21. The film also screened at Fantastic Fest on September 23, 2025.

One Battle After Another was projected in the VistaVision format, with screenings at the Vista Theatre in Los Angeles, Regal Union Square 17 in New York, Coolidge Corner Theatre in Brookline, and Odeon Luxe Leicester Square in London. The film was also released in other formats, including 4DX, digital IMAX, Dolby Vision, IMAX 70 mm, and standard 70 mm film. It also screened in 35 mm at the New Beverly Cinema in June 2026.

In January 2026, it was reported that the film would return to select IMAX 70 mm locations to celebrate its Academy Award nominations.

=== Home media ===
One Battle After Another was released on digital streaming on November 14, 2025, and on 4K Ultra HD Blu-ray, Blu-ray, and DVD on January 20, 2026. It began streaming on HBO Max on December 19, 2025. The film was released on JioHotstar in India on February 26, 2026. Streaming analytics firm FlixPatrol, which monitors daily updated VOD charts and streaming ratings across the globe, reported that One Battle After Another became the most-streamed film on HBO Max within the first four days of its release in December 2025. The film also ranked as the No. 1 film globally on the streaming service as of December 23. It became available to stream on HBO Max in the United Kingdom on March 26, 2026; UK-based viewers are also able to stream the film via NOW and Sky Cinema.

Following the film's success at the 98th Academy Awards, where it won six Oscars (including Best Picture), it received newfound success on the Apple TV store, despite being available to stream on HBO Max. FlixPatrol reported that the film's PVOD success on iTunes surged, with it hitting #1 in the United States as of March 17, 2026, where it also topped the charts in 33 other countries.

On June 2, 2026, One Battle After Another was released as a collectible 4K UHD Blu-ray SteelBook. It includes new bonus features and behind-the-scenes materials curated by Anderson, including camera, lighting and costume tests, a screen test from Infiniti, and a feature-length "making-of" documentary. Additional extras include a deep dive into the editing process and footage from the film's opening night at the Vista Theatre, plus a 24-page booklet of behind-the-scenes photography.

== Reception ==
=== Box office ===
One Battle After Another grossed $72.9 million in the U.S. and Canada, and $140.3 million in other territories, for a worldwide total of $213.2 million. The film ended up being a box office failure, falling short of its estimated $300 million break-even point and losing Warner Bros. an estimated $100 million during its theatrical run. (Note: Attributed to multiple references:) It is also Anderson's highest-grossing release to date.

In the U.S. and Canada, the film opened in 3,634 theaters, the widest release for a film directed by Anderson and his first to debut in wide release. It made $8.8 million on its first day, including $3.1 million from Thursday previews. The film earned $22 million over the weekend, topping the box office, and handily marking the best weekend for a film directed by Anderson, topping the $4.9 million earned by There Will Be Blood in its fifth weekend in 2008. In its second weekend, One Battle After Another grossed $11 million (a drop of 50%), finishing second behind then-newcomer Taylor Swift: The Official Release Party of a Showgirl.

=== Critical response ===
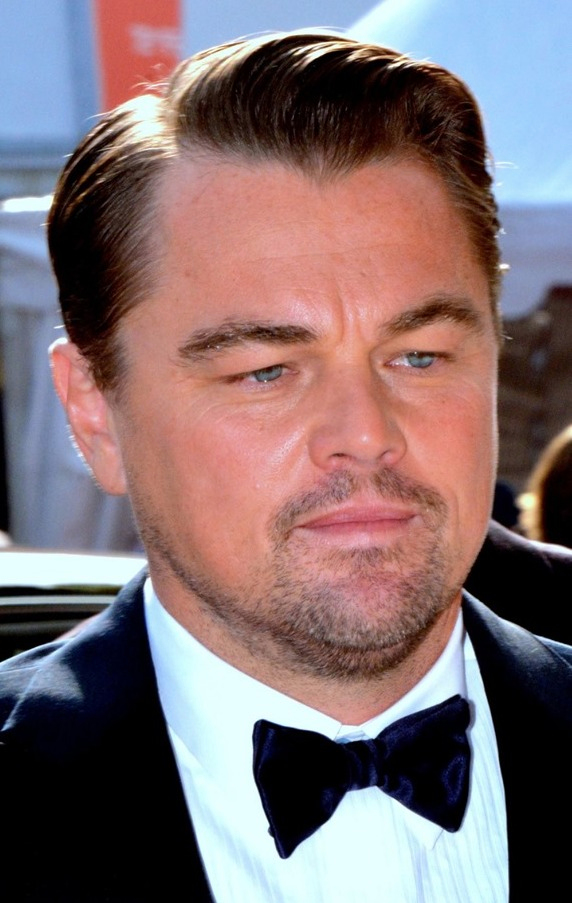
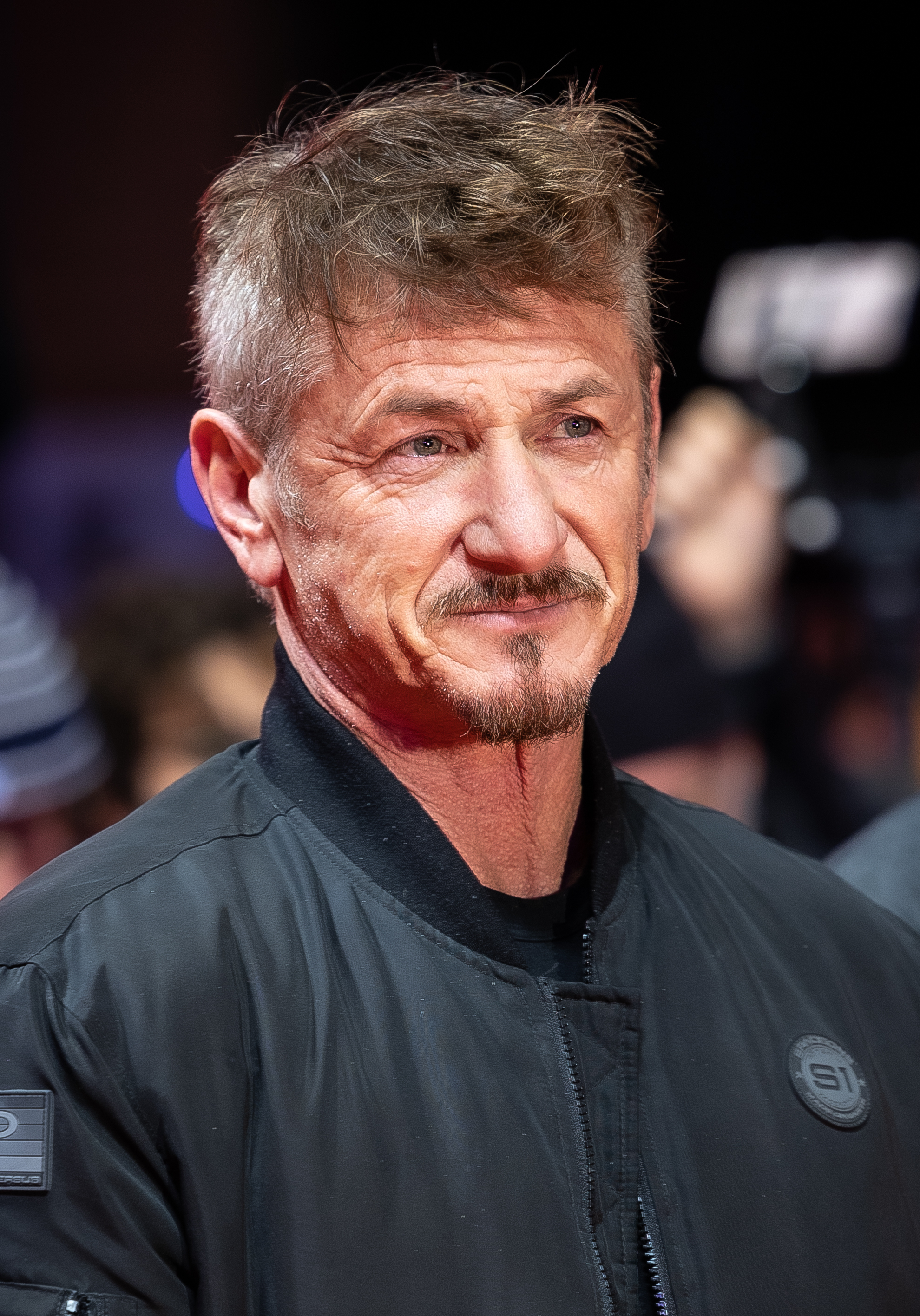
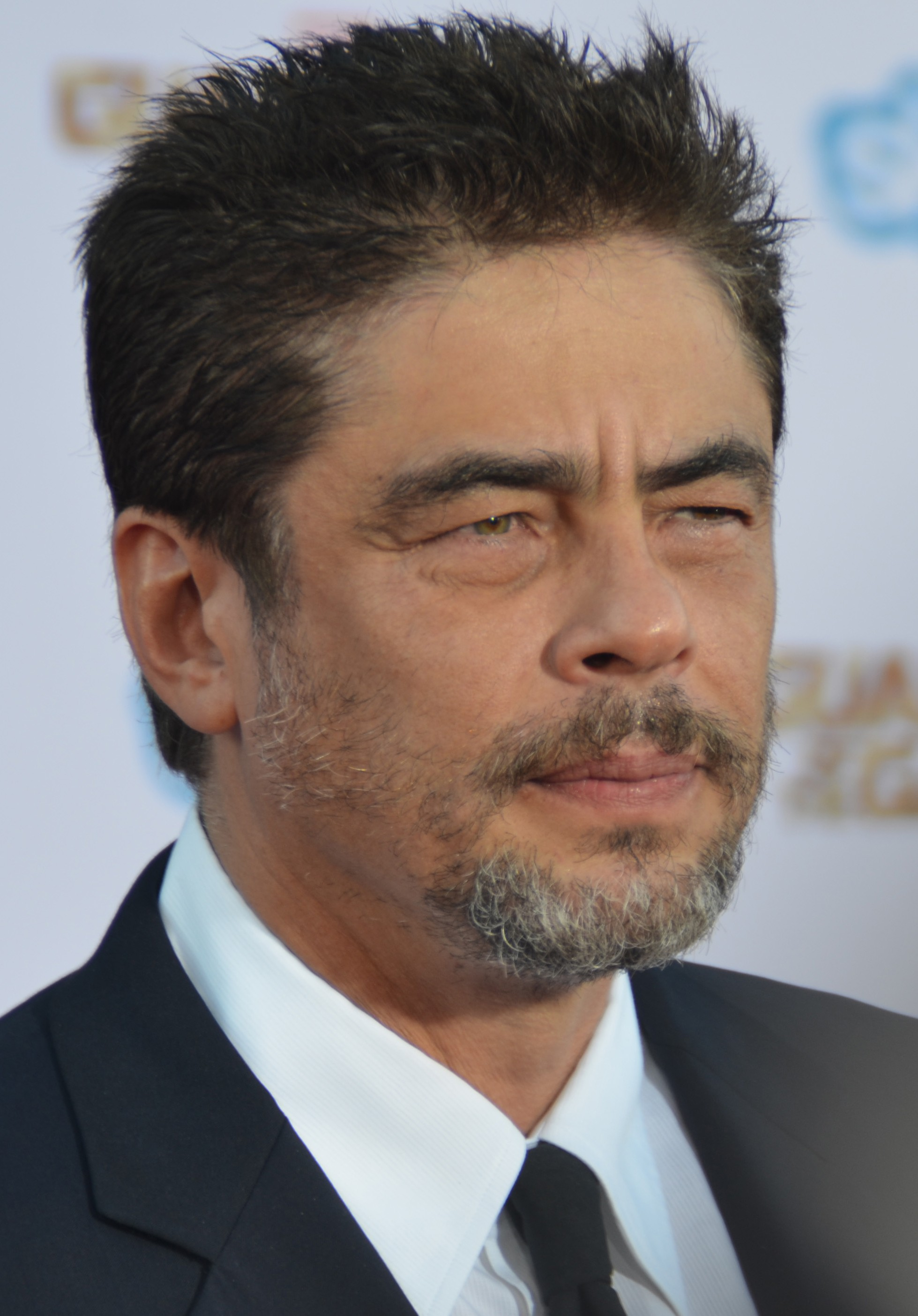
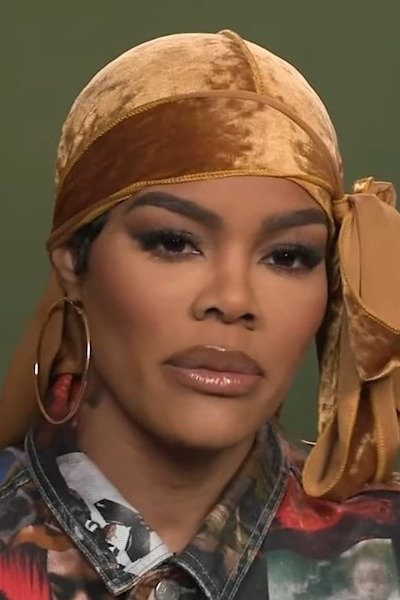
Leonardo DiCaprio, Sean Penn, Benicio del Toro, and Teyana Taylor garnered critical acclaim for their performances and earned Academy Award nominations for Best Actor (DiCaprio), Best Supporting Actor (del Toro and Penn) and Best Supporting Actress (Taylor), respectively, with Penn winning.

The film received widespread acclaim, with multiple critics calling the film a "masterpiece". (Note: Attributed to multiple references:) On the review aggregator website Rotten Tomatoes, 94% of 448 critics' reviews are positive, with an average rating of 8.9/10. The website's consensus reads: "An epic screwball adventure teeming with awe-inspiring action set pieces, One Battle After Another is Paul Thomas Anderson's most entertaining film yet while also one of his most thematically rich." Metacritic, which uses a weighted average, assigned the film a score of 95 out of 100, based on 63 critics, indicating "universal acclaim". Audiences polled by CinemaScore gave the film an average grade of "A" on its A+ to F scale, while those at PostTrak rated the film four-and-a-half out of five stars, with 74% of audiences saying they would "definitely recommend" it.

Owen Gleiberman of Variety wrote that the film "taps into the fierce urgency of now; it gives you a chill that's also a wake-up call", adding that it "has the kind of twists and turns that feed the audience, giving us the childlike sensation that we have no idea what's coming next, and that that's the happiest way there is to watch a movie". Brian Tallerico of RogerEbert.com wrote that One Battle After Another "is a timeless story of resistance, one that playfully weaves together influences as broad-reaching as the true story of Weather Underground and cinematic depictions of rebellion, but it's also a remarkably propulsive, fun, and eventually moving piece of work about the human beings caught up in the chaotic machine". Justin Chang of The New Yorker called the film "a father-daughter epic, with an unusually personal gush of feeling. You can count on one hand the number of scenes that Bob and Willa share, but their connection – a swirl of protectiveness, exasperation, and fiercely unconditional love – binds the movie and its madly whirling parts together".

Katie Walsh of the Chicago Tribune called the film a "searing indictment of this particular moment in American history" by which "Anderson balances the sprawling, conspiracy-minded aspects of this yarn with the intimate father-daughter story, which is the heart of the matter". Writing for The New York Times, Manohla Dargis called the film "a carnivalesque epic about good and evil, violence and power, inalienable rights and the fight against injustice; it's also a love story. The film speaks to the failures of the past and of the present but insists on the promise of the future". Richard Lawson of The Hollywood Reporter wrote that One Battle After Another is "a furious film, a richly engaging and persuasive polemic" in which "Anderson shows a previously unseen aptitude for action and suspense; One Battle After Another is, essentially, a thriller, albeit one teeming with enormous ideas about the collapse and possible rescue of the country".

Alex Saveliev of Film Threat opened his review by writing that the film "demands to be seen on the largest screen possible to fully absorb the 35 mm VistaVision experience with every cell of your body. Everything about it is grand: its characters, its action sequences, its timely sentiments, even the quieter moments". Peter Bradshaw, awarding the film five stars and writing for The Guardian, was effusive in his praise. He celebrated the "riff on the now recognisable Anderson-Pynchonian idea of counterculture and counter-revolution", praised the score by Greenwood, and pondered if the "central paternity crisis triangle [is] an image for an ownership dispute around the American melting-pot dream".

The performances of the cast were also highly praised. (Note: Attributed to multiple references:) Gleiberman also added that "Anderson knows that the quality that liberates DiCaprio is comedy. By having him play Bob as a dissolute stoner addict, discombobulated by his loss of faith, he humanizes DiCaprio and coaxes a great performance out of him." Tallerico of RogerEbert.com felt DiCaprio gives a "carefully modulated" performance, but he nevertheless singled out Sean Penn's performance as "his best work in years", writing he "flexes his muscles, grits his teeth, and growls his lines, but somehow threads the needle between truth and caricature". David Sims of The Atlantic opined, "Penn, giving a brilliant performance of cold villainy that could win him a third Oscar, is unafraid of lancing the inherent goofiness of a fascist. DiCaprio plays Bob as a sweetheart rather than a buffoon; he's a tired, strung-out antihero made weary not by his yearslong efforts to fight back but by the relentlessness of the world." David Ehrlich of IndieWire praised "magnetically self-possessed newcomer/instant movie star Chase Infiniti, whose performance inspires a strange kind of secondhand pride". He also singled out the performances of Penn and Taylor, calling the latter "eruptive [...] steaming with revolutionary zeal" and the former "career-best". Deadline Hollywood's Pete Hammond called Penn's performance "a riot to watch" while considering the performance of Taylor as "dazzling" and "unforgettable".

William Bibbiani of TheWrap was less enthusiastic, describing the plot as scattershot, unfocused, overly long, and the film's themes as shallow, writing that Anderson was "more interested in taking cheap potshots at the film's real-world analogues than actually exploring them". The Wall Street Journal's Kyle Smith similarly noted the film is "big and brash. Rangy in tone, style and theme, it has so much going on that a single viewing hardly seems sufficient to absorb it all. Whether it's a masterpiece or a hodgepodge will be a matter of some discussion; the reach is evident but the grasp is a little shaky". Israeli media-critic Liel Leibovitz of The Free Press described the film as "irredeemable" and "just another sign that Hollywood has once again driven itself to total moral, artistic, and creative ruin".

Author Bret Easton Ellis dismissed the praise, arguing that the film, in which he found a "liberal mustiness," is a hit with critics only because it aligns with a "leftist sensibility." Several right-wing commentators, such as Ben Shapiro or film critic Armond White, criticized One Battle for being a "left-wing" movie "made for left-wing elites sitting in their left-wing bubble."

During a post-screening panel discussion with Anderson, fellow filmmaker and moderator Steven Spielberg highly praised the film, calling it "insane" and "really incredible", adding, "This is such a concoction of things that are so bizarre and at the same time so relevant, that I think have become increasingly more relevant than perhaps even when [Anderson] finished the screenplay, and assembled [the] cast and crew, and began production." The film garnered significant praise by other prominent filmmakers, including Francis Ford Coppola, Michael Mann, and Paul Schrader.

Producer Sara Murphy said she hoped the film's reception among audiences and critics would encourage more studios to invest in "risky" projects similar to it, adding, "Original films are not usually done at this level [of] a big, good-time movie."

=== Critical analysis ===
According to Jesse Hassenger of The Guardian, the "film has irked some on the right and galvanized others on the left". Hassenger added that some on the right accused the film for being "an apologia for radical left-wing terrorism".

==== Political views and controversies ====
The New York Times' Michelle Goldberg argued it was "an antifascist movie at a fascist moment", a film which she observed "was made in the America that existed before Donald Trump's return" to office eight months earlier; Goldberg wondered whether or not "such a forthrightly antifascist film could be produced in Hollywood today".

Author, podcaster, and screenwriter Bret Easton Ellis alleged, "It's kind of shocking to see these kind [sic] of accolades for – I'm sorry, it's not a very good movie – because of its political ideology, and it's so obvious that's what they're responding to [...] Why it's considered a masterpiece, the greatest film of the decade, the greatest film ever made [is] because it really aligns with this kind of leftist sensibility." Ellis later added on his podcast allegations that, "You have the left and the entertainment press propping this movie up to such an absurd degree that it felt unnatural."

Responding to the political controversies surrounding the film, Gleiberman posited that "part of the power of One Battle After Another is that it is not, in fact, a left-wing movie, it's important to recognize how that misperception has been fed by a lot of people on the left [...] I think a lot of the attitude of the entertainment media has been to reflexively treat One Battle After Another as if the film itself were raising a revolutionary fist – and as if there were something 'left-wing' about attacking authoritarianism. There is not."

==== Authoritarian immigration enforcement ====
The film broaches the subject of the U.S. Immigration and Customs Enforcement (ICE) agency with the French 75's raid on Otay Mesa Detention Center, an ICE facility; the agency is not mentioned directly. However, as authority is depicted in the film as unpredictable, militarized, and with the power to destabilize entire neighborhoods, many critics and outlets agreed that this made the film's release incredibly "timely" amidst the expansion of ICE operations under the second Trump administration. (Note: Attributed to multiple references:) Murphy said in February 2026 that the concurrent ICE operations in Minneapolis, which killed civilians, made the film "devastatingly" timely:

I don't think we could have anticipated just how close to home it would be. It's hitting an audience in their core. I think it is reflective of the world that we're living in today, but I think, hopefully, it is also an optimistic take on how we can continue to fight for the things that are important to us and find peace in community. I hope the takeaway is one of optimism.

In January 2026, Daniel Boguslaw of The American Prospect compared the character Steven J. Lockjaw to then-commander of the U.S. Border Patrol Gregory Bovino, who promoted aggressive law enforcement tactics within the agency.

==== Perfidia's character and racial themes ====
Ellen E Jones of The Guardian opined that the film's handling of racial themes "raises questions about how white male directors depict Black women", particularly with regards to Perfidia Beverly Hills, and the ways in which she is sexualized by two white men (Pat/Bob and Lockjaw, the latter a white supremacist); Bibbiani argued that Perfidia is a sex criminal. The New York Times' Maya Phillips called Perfidia "the most radical part" of the film, writing, "In one major sense, the film does send a nuanced political message embodied in the brief and mysterious arc of Perfidia Beverly Hills: that the success of a contemporary American political movement is inextricably tied to the sexual freedom and agency of Black women." In November 2025, Taylor rejected these critiques, stating:

Is that not what Black women go through? We are fetishized [...] and we are, unfortunately, the least protected people. Showing what Black women go through, that's a hard reality to accept. And this movie should spark debate, I always knew it would, because sometimes you just got to shake the table.

In January 2026, Taylor explained further: "[People feel] like she was overly horny. And I'm like, do you realize the first thing we see of Perfidia is her having a gun to a guy's head, and he calls her 'sweet thing'? Are you – are we watching the same film?" She said that Perfidia weaponizes her sexuality against her enemies: "Perfidia kind of dived into the, 'Oh, you think I'm hot? All right, bet. Cool if I get to still do what I'm doing'." Perfidia's decisions, Taylor said, are made in "survival mode":

It will never be a moment of judgment, because a lot of her mistakes have come from her being in survival mode, dealing with postpartum depression and the title of being a strong woman – a strong Black woman. We don't get the same amount of compassion as everybody else. We don't get the same amount of grace as everybody else. Everybody just assumes we're okay.

In February 2026, Taylor stated that Perfidia "is so misunderstood, but most importantly, human, and so raw. And she is unapologetically herself", adding:

[People] just write her off as like, she's just horny [...] Perfidia became a revolutionary because of the things that she believes in. You see her mom saying Perfidia comes from a long line of revolutionaries. That in itself, to any woman, any person, is also a pressure. So not only is she carrying it on, it is instilled in her, and now it's become a part of her identity.

In March 2026, backstage at the 98th Academy Awards, Anderson addressed the critiques regarding Perfidia's character:

[Perfidia] was so flawed and unfortunately makes decisions that are detrimental to the revolution that she's trying to fight. It's complicated. We always knew that we were trying to make something complicated. We knew that we weren't making something that was heroic and we needed to lean into that. We need to own the fact that this woman was suffering not only from postpartum depression, but she had issues of her own that she hadn't really reconciled with. It's a very dangerous thing, when you start out and want to change the world, but you start to kind of become selfish; you read your own reviews. That was our hero in Perfidia, who becomes an antihero. The point of it is to set up a story of Willa, the next generation. What happens when your parents, who are damaged and have handed quite a difficult history to you – how do you manage that? That's our story. Our story is in Chase [Infiniti] and her reaching, like I talked about in terms of the generational aspect, to try to do better.

=== Year-end lists ===
The American Film Institute and National Board of Review listed One Battle After Another as one of 2025's ten best films. Film Comment, a New York Times' readers poll, and a Sight and Sound poll of over 100 international critics all ranked it as the year's best. IndieWire's annual critics poll also ranked the film at #1, with a final result of 573 points; 101 of the 148 critics who voted had One Battle After Another somewhere on their Top 10 ballots, while 43 of those 101 mentions were #1 picks. Additionally, IndieWire surveyed fifty filmmakers' favorite films of the year; twenty listed One Battle After Another. These included Fede Álvarez, Olivier Assayas, Clint Bentley, Oliver Laxe, and Michael Mann; Laxe called the film "a testament to the excess of our times, on every level". In his list of 2025's 20 best films, Rolling Stone's David Fear called One Battle After Another a "thundering, dizzying epic", and "a timeless tale about revolutionaries taking care of their own while getting the next generation to pick up the flag".

One Battle After Another appeared on more critics' annual "best of" lists than any other 2025 film, receiving the most #1 votes. The film was included on 735 lists, with 212 ranking it at #1. It appeared on former U.S. president Barack Obama's annual list of his favorite films of each year; though it was not ranked, One Battle After Another appeared at the top of the list.

- 1st – Phil Bacharach (Oklahoma Gazette)
- 1st – Lindsey Bahr (Associated Press)
- 1st – Peter Bradshaw (The Guardian)
- 1st – Max Cea (Esquire)
- 1st – Jake Coyle (Associated Press)
- 1st – David Crow (Den of Geek)
- 1st – David Ehrlich (IndieWire)
- 1st – David Fear (Rolling Stone)
- 1st – Dan Gentile (SFGate)
- 1st – Owen Gleiberman (Variety)
- 1st – Bill Goodykoontz (The Arizona Republic)
- 1st – André Hereford (Metro Weekly)
- 1st – Josh Larsen (Filmspotting)
- 1st – Daniel Loria (Boxoffice Pro)
- 1st – Kiko Martinez (San Antonio Current)
- 1st – Malcolm McMillan (Tom's Guide)
- 1st – Agnivo Niyogi (The Telegraph)
- 1st – Clinton Olsasky (Iowa Public Radio)
- 1st – James Owen (Columbia Daily Tribune)
- 1st – Spencer Perry (ComicBook.com)
- 1st – Michael Phillips (Filmspotting)
- 1st – David Sims (The Atlantic)
- 1st – Kevin Slane (Boston.com)
- 1st – Peter Travers (The Travers Take)
- 1st – Alissa Wilkinson (The New York Times)
- 1st – Alison Willmore (Vulture)

Fear also included Penn and Taylor's performances in his Rolling Stone list of 2025's 17 best film performances. Taylor's was named one of the year's 25 best by The Hollywood Reporter. Vanity Fair also listed Taylor's as one of the best; Mark Guiducci wrote that "there is much to love about [One Battle After Another], but Taylor is at the top of the list". Penn's performance was ranked by multiple critics as one of the best villain performances of 2025.

In December 2025, Collider's William Smith ranked One Battle After Another 9th on his list of the "10 Greatest Movie Masterpieces of the Last 10 Years", calling it one of "the most imminent" and "entertaining" films of the year, and adding that its "righteous indignation" and "bold politics" feel "particularly pointed and appropriate for the current state of America". Collider's Diego Pineda Pacheco ranked the film 8th on his list of the "10 Greatest Movie Masterpieces of the 21st Century", writing, "[Anderson] has been delivering masterpiece after masterpiece since the '90s, but this one truly does feel like the epitome of his career, an artistic achievement unlike any other he's made before ... [the film] is full of fascinating characters and exceptional performers, making it an enthralling dramedy packed with exquisite creative choices."

In February 2026, Collider ranked One Battle After Another as the best film of 2025 in their list of "The Greatest Movie of Every Year of the 21st Century (So Far)", writing that it is "a comedic epic of sorts" and "moves at a mean pace and never drags", adding, "The tension is never undermined by the comedy, and the comedy never clashes with the parts of the film that are meant to be a bit more serious. It's incredibly well-balanced for something so grand and ambitious, and it seems likely that it'll continue to remain entertaining, relevant, and distinctive as the years march on further."

=== Accolades ===
At the 31st Critics' Choice Awards, One Battle After Another won three awards, including Best Picture and Best Director for Anderson. It was also nominated for nine awards at the 83rd Golden Globes, receiving the most nominations of any film that year; del Toro, DiCaprio, Infiniti, Penn, and Taylor all received nominations for their performances. Ultimately, the film won four Golden Globes: Best Motion Picture – Musical or Comedy, Best Director, Best Supporting Actress – Motion Picture (Taylor), and Best Screenplay. It also became the most-nominated film in the history of the Screen Actors Guild at the 32nd Actor Awards, with a record-breaking seven nominations and Penn winning Outstanding Performance by a Male Actor in a Supporting Role.

At the 79th British Academy Film Awards, the film led the nominations with fourteen overall, winning six, including Best Film and Best Director. Additionally, at the 98th Academy Awards, the film received thirteen nominations, including Best Picture, Best Director, Best Adapted Screenplay and four acting nominations (for del Toro, DiCaprio, Penn, and Taylor), the second-most of any film that year. The film went on to win six Oscars: Best Picture (Somner, (Note: Adam Somner became the second producer, following Sam Zimbalist (for 1959's Ben-Hur), to win posthumously for Best Picture) Murphy, and Anderson), Best Director (Anderson), Best Supporting Actor (Penn), Best Adapted Screenplay (Anderson), Best Film Editing (Jurgensen), and Best Casting (Kulukundis), becoming the inaugural recipient for the latter.

== See also ==
- The Battle of Algiers, a 1966 Italian-Algerian war film that Bob Ferguson watches on television in the film
- List of media set in San Diego
- "The Revolution Will Not Be Televised", a poem and Black liberation song by Gil Scott-Heron whose lyrics are used by the French 75 as a countersign in the film
