= The English Teacher (film) =

- Theatrical release poster
- Directed by: Craig Zisk
- Written by: Dan Chariton; Stacy Chariton
- Produced by: Matthew E. Chausse; Naomi Despres; Ben LeClair; Robert Salerno
- Starring: Julianne Moore; Michael Angarano; Greg Kinnear; Lily Collins; Nathan Lane
- Cinematography: Vanja Cernjul
- Edited by: Myron Kerstein
- Music by: Rob Simonsen
- Production company: Artina Films
- Distributed by: Cinedigm Entertainment; Tribeca Film
- Release dates: April 26, 2013 (Tribeca Film Festival); May 17, 2013 (United States)
- Running time: 93 minutes
- Country: United States
- Language: English
- Box office: $320,013

The English Teacher is a 2013 American romantic comedy-drama film directed by Craig Zisk. The film stars Julianne Moore, Michael Angarano, Greg Kinnear, Lily Collins, and Nathan Lane, and was written by Dan and Stacy Chariton.

The film follows lonely, small town English teacher Linda Sinclair, whose life is disrupted when former student Jason Sherwood returns to town after failing as a playwright in New York.

The English Teacher premiered on April 26, 2013, receiving mixed reviews and failing to make a profit.

== Plot ==
Linda Sinclair is a high school English teacher in the small town of Kingston, Pennsylvania. She is passionate about her subject and popular with her students, but lives alone in simple circumstances. Cursed with a hopelessly romantic soul, she lives in a world of men unable to match her impossible standards.

When her former star pupil Jason Sherwood returns after graduating from NYU's playwriting program, crushed and insecure after failing to succeed, Linda and drama teacher Carl Kapinas convince him to produce his play at the school. Jason's father, Dr. Tom Sherwood, pressures him to attend law school instead, which he finally seemingly relents to with no other prospects in sight.

Complications arise after Linda and Jason, in a moment of impulsive creative madness, have a sexual encounter on her classroom desk. Various jealousies and rumors ensue, affecting her and everyone around her including the production of Jason's play. When the school heads are confronted with proof of her indiscretion with the former student, Linda is fired on the spot.

Embarrassed, Linda hurries off, gets into a minor car collision, and ends up at a hospital where she is attended to by Dr. Sherwood. She is moved by his gracious manner after having been mean to him on a previous occasion. She guiltily admits to having had sex with his son.

With news of advance-ticket sales of beyond $18,000 for Jason's play, the principal backtracks. He persuades Linda to return and resume directing duties, as stress has temporarily incapacitated Carl, so the play may go on. However, the school heads require a new ending for the play as the current one is considered overly violent and they fear parents will be outraged by its dark themes of murder and suicide. Jason feels betrayed and refuses to rewrite the play's ending, so Linda is forced to come up with a suitable replacement herself. She manages to redo the ending which appeases the school and Jason (when he sees the play is a success).

Jason moves on to write further plays as Linda eases back into teaching and regaining her reputation. Sometime later, she runs into Jason's father at her favorite bookshop. Catching up over coffee, both realize they'd totally misread each other previously. Grateful for all she has done for his son, and pleasantly surprised they have much more in common than previously thought, Tom invites Linda on a further proper date, and she, somewhat hesitantly, accepts.

== Cast ==
- Julianne Moore as Linda Sinclair
- Michael Angarano as Jason Sherwood
- Greg Kinnear as Dr. Tom Sherwood
- Lily Collins as Halle Anderson
- Nathan Lane as Carl Kapinas
- Jessica Hecht as Principal Trudie Slocum
- Norbert Leo Butz as Vice-Principal Phil Pelaski
- Nikki Blonsky as Sheila Nussbaum
- Erin Wilhelmi as Joni Gerber
- Alan Aisenberg as Benjamin Meyer
- Charlie Saxton as Will
- Sophie Curtis as Fallon Hughes
- Fiona Shaw (voice only) as Narrator

== Production ==
The English Teacher was first announced in September 2011. It was Zisk's feature film directorial debut, following his work on several television shows, including Weeds, The Big C, Scrubs, and The United States of Tara.

== Release ==
The film had its world premiere at the Tribeca Film Festival on April 26, 2013, followed by a US theatrical release on May 17. It was released in seven theaters, earning $104,810 at the domestic box office and $215,203 in other territories, for a worldwide gross of $320,013. The film also had a video on demand release.

== Reception ==
On Rotten Tomatoes, the film has an approval rating of 46% based on reviews from 35 critics, with an average rating of 5.39/10. On Metacritic, the film has a score of 42 out of 100, based on reviews from 13 critics, indicating "mixed or average reviews".
