= Andy Jurgensen =

American film editor

- Born: Andrew Jurgensen; 1981 or 1982 (age 43–44); Orange County, California, U.S.
- Education: University of California, Santa Barbara (2004)
- Occupation: Film editing
- Notable work: One Battle After Another; Licorice Pizza
- Awards: Academy Award for Best Film Editing (2025); BAFTA Award for Best Editing (2025)

Andrew Jurgensen (born c. 1981 or 1982) is an American film editor, best known for his collaborations with director Paul Thomas Anderson. Jurgensen's editing credits include Licorice Pizza (2021) and One Battle After Another (2025), the latter of which earned Jurgensen an Academy Award and a BAFTA Award.

== Early life and education ==
Jurgensen was born c. 1981 or 1982 in Orange County, California. He was raised in Orange County, attended Servite High School, and graduated in 2000. He later attended the University of California, Santa Barbara and graduated in 2004.

== Career ==
Jurgensen began working as a post-production assistant after college, and met Paul Thomas Anderson while serving as an assistant editor for Inherent Vice (2014). Jurgensen was made an associate editor for Phantom Thread (2017), and then primary editor for Licorice Pizza (2021). For Licorice Pizza, Jurgensen earned nominations for the BAFTA Award and the Critics' Choice Movie Award for Best Editing.

Jurgensen worked closely with Anderson during the production and post-production of One Battle After Another (2025), a black comedy action thriller starring Leonardo DiCaprio, shot by Michael Bauman on VistaVision cameras. The film's editing was critically praised, particularly that of the film's climactic car chase. Jurgensen was once again nominated for the BAFTA and Critics' Choice Award, and won an Academy Award.
