= Licorice Pizza =

2021 film by Paul Thomas Anderson

- Theatrical release poster
- Directed by: Paul Thomas Anderson
- Written by: Paul Thomas Anderson
- Produced by: Sara Murphy; Adam Somner; Paul Thomas Anderson
- Starring: Alana Haim; Cooper Hoffman; Sean Penn; Tom Waits; Bradley Cooper; Benny Safdie
- Cinematography: Michael Bauman; Paul Thomas Anderson
- Edited by: Andy Jurgensen
- Music by: Jonny Greenwood
- Production companies: Metro-Goldwyn-Mayer Pictures; Focus Features; Bron Creative; Ghoulardi Film Company
- Distributed by: United Artists Releasing (United States); Universal Pictures (international)
- Release date: November 26, 2021
- Running time: 133 minutes
- Country: United States
- Language: English
- Budget: $40 million
- Box office: $33.3 million

Licorice Pizza is a 2021 American coming-of-age comedy drama film written, produced, shot and directed by Paul Thomas Anderson. It stars Alana Haim and Cooper Hoffman in their film debuts, alongside an ensemble supporting cast including Sean Penn, Tom Waits, Bradley Cooper, and Benny Safdie. Set in 1973, the film follows the relationship between a teenage actor (Hoffman) and a young woman (Haim).

The film was released in the United States in select theaters on November 26, 2021, followed by a wide release on December 25. Though it grossed $33.3 million against its $40 million production budget, the film was acclaimed by critics and received three nominations at the 94th Academy Awards: Best Picture, Best Director, and Best Original Screenplay, making it Metro-Goldwyn-Mayer's first fully produced, marketed, and distributed film to be nominated for Best Picture since Rain Man in 1988. Among its many other nominations and awards, it received three awards from the National Board of Review (including Best Film), was named one of the best films of 2021 by the American Film Institute, received four nominations at the 79th Golden Globe Awards (including Best Motion Picture – Musical or Comedy), and won the BAFTA Award for Best Original Screenplay.

== Plot ==
In 1973 San Fernando Valley, 15-year-old actor Gary Valentine meets 25-year-old Alana Kane, a photographer's assistant, at his school picture day. She is put off by his invitation to dinner, but shows up anyway.

When Gary's mother cannot chaperone him on a press tour performance in New York City, he invites Alana. He is jealous when Alana begins dating his co-star Lance, but they break up after Lance reveals he is an atheist during Shabbat dinner with her Jewish family. Gary begins selling waterbeds and reconnects with Alana at a teenage trade expo. Mistaken for a murder suspect, Gary is arrested and Alana runs after him to the police station, but he is soon released.

Alana joins Gary's waterbed business, acting seductively on the phone to land a potential customer. Introducing her to his talent agent, he is upset that she is open to nudity but refuses to show him her breasts. She impulsively does so, but slaps him when he asks to touch them. They open a "Fat Bernie's" storefront for their waterbeds, and Alana is hurt when Gary flirts with his classmate Sue. Peeking in on them making out in the back room, Alana kisses a man on the street before storming off back home.

Gary's agent secures an audition for Alana for a film starring veteran actor Jack Holden, who takes her to the Tail o' the Cock restaurant, where Gary and his friends are also dining. An intoxicated Alana makes Gary jealous, and Holden's friend, film director Rex Blau, convinces him to recreate one of his motorcycle stunts on a nearby golf course, bringing the entire restaurant along. Alana topples off the bike before Holden jumps over a flaming sand trap, and Gary runs to her side. Reconciled, they walk to the waterbed store, where Gary stops himself from touching a sleeping Alana's breast.

The 1973 oil crisis sweeps the country, forcing the waterbed manufacturer to close. Alana, Gary, and his friends make one final delivery to the home of Jon Peters, who humiliates Gary before leaving to meet his girlfriend, Barbra Streisand. Filling up the waterbed inside, Gary intentionally leaves the hose running, with Alana's approval. They drive away but are waved down by an agitated Peters, whose car has run out of gas, and leave him at a crowded gas station when he violently commandeers a gas pump. Gary stops to smash Peters's car, but runs out of gas as well. Alana maneuvers their truck backward down a long hill to a gas station, impressing Gary, but causing her to question her recent decisions.

Inspired by a campaign poster, Alana reaches out to her old classmate Brian, who brings her on as volunteer staffer for Joel Wachs, a city councilman running for mayor. Gary briefly joins her but overhears that pinball will soon be legalized in the Valley and decides to open an arcade, leading to an argument with Alana about their difference in age and their fraught relationship. Emasculating Gary to make herself feel superior, Alana offers to drive him home in an attempt to make peace, but Gary drives off alone.

Later, Gary prepares for the opening night of his arcade, remodeling his storefront into "Fat Bernie's Pinball Palace." That same night, Alana nearly shares a kiss with Brian, but is interrupted by an invitation from Wachs. Thinking it is a date, she is dejected to discover Wachs wants her to pose as the girlfriend of his secret boyfriend, Matthew, to save him from political embarrassment.

Alana walks a deeply hurt Matthew home, and they commiserate over the men in their lives. She goes to the arcade to find Gary, who has left to look for her at Wachs's office, with her sisters' encouragement. They eventually run to each other's arms and return to the arcade, where Gary announces her as "Mrs. Alana Valentine." Sharing a kiss, they run into the night, and Alana tells Gary that she loves him.

== Cast ==
- Alana Haim as Alana Kane
- Cooper Hoffman as Gary Valentine. He is based on film producer and former child actor Gary Goetzman.
- Sean Penn as Jack Holden, an actor based on William Holden
- Tom Waits as Rex Blau, a film director
- Bradley Cooper as Jon Peters, a hairstylist
- Benny Safdie as Joel Wachs, a politician running for Mayor of Los Angeles
- Skyler Gisondo as Lance Brannigan, an actor and love interest of Alana
- Mary Elizabeth Ellis as Momma Anita, Gary's mother
- John Michael Higgins as Jerry Frick, a Los Angeles businessman who opened the Mikado Hotel and restaurant in 1963. The Mikado was the first Japanese restaurant in the San Fernando Valley.
- Christine Ebersole as Lucy Doolittle, an actress based on Lucille Ball
- Harriet Sansom Harris as Mary Grady, Valentine's agent. Grady was a Hollywood child talent agent and mother of actors Don Grady and Lani O'Grady.
- Ryan Heffington as Steve, Barbra Streisand's assistant
- Nate Mann as Brian, Alana's friend who works for Wachs' campaign
- Joseph Cross as Matthew, Wachs' secret boyfriend
- Isabelle Kusman as Sue Pomerantz, one of Gary's classmates
- Destry Allyn Spielberg as Frisbee Kahill, an employee at the Mikado
- George DiCaprio as Mr. Jack, the owner of a wig shop that also sells waterbeds
- Iyana Halley as Brenda, an employee at Mr. Jack's store
- Ray Chase as B. Mitchel Reed, a radio disc jockey
- Emma Dumont as Brenda, a flight attendant
- Yumi Mizui as Mioko, Frick's first wife
- Megumi Anjo as Kimiko, Frick's second wife
- Maya Rudolph as Gale, Vic's assistant
- Tim Conway Jr. as Vic, a casting director
- Emily Althaus as Kiki Page, Gary's waterbed model at the Teen-Age Fair
- Milo Herschlag as Greg Valentine, Gary's younger brother

Haim's sisters Danielle and Este, father Moti, and mother Donna also appear as Alana Kane's family. Appearing as Gary's friends are Griff Giacchino as Mark, James Kelley as Tim, and Will Angarola as Kirk. The children of Anderson and Rudolph, as well as the relatives and children of other filmmakers and cast members, also appear in brief roles. John C. Reilly has an uncredited cameo as Fred Gwynne, the actor who portrayed Herman Munster (the credits list him as "Herman Munster as himself"), while Dan Chariton cameos as Sam Harpoon, a film director.

== Production ==
=== Development ===
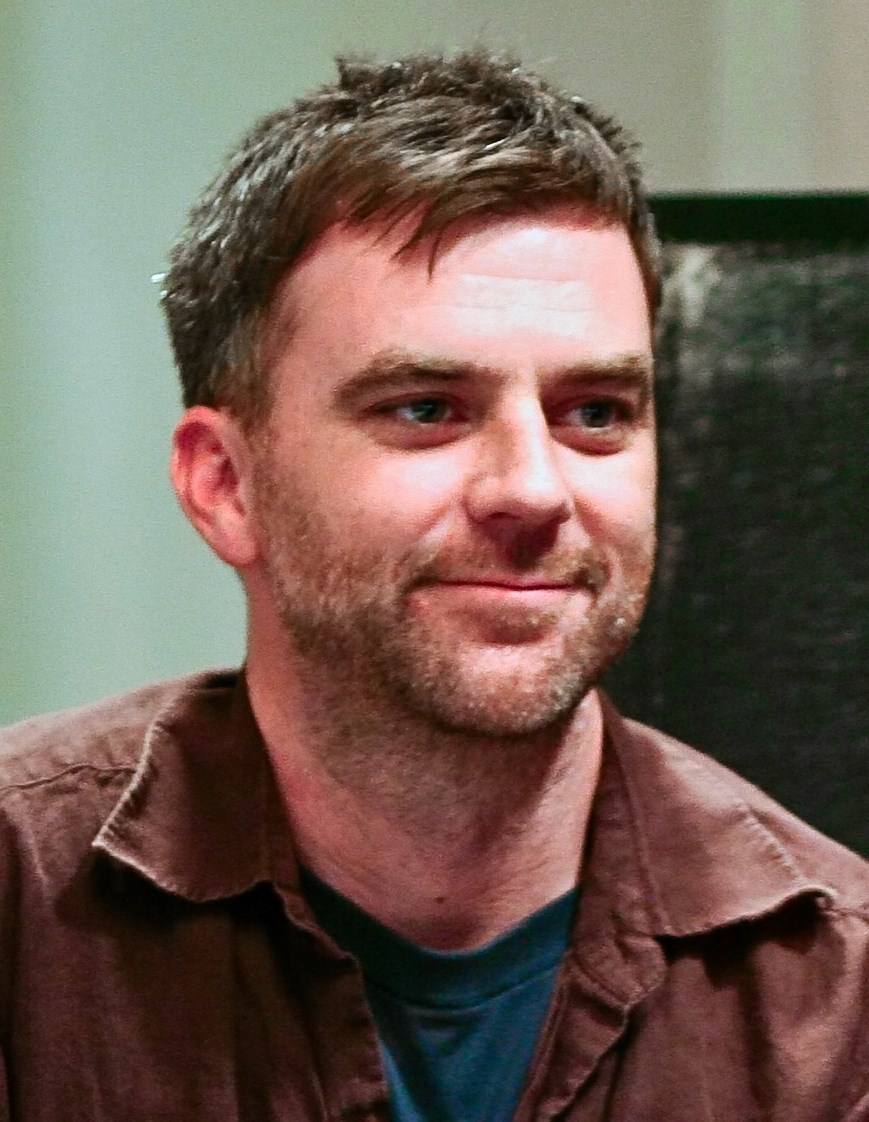
Writer, director, and producer Paul Thomas Anderson.

Around 2001, Paul Thomas Anderson was walking by a middle school in Los Angeles on picture day. He observed one of the students nagging the female photographer and had an idea of the student having a romantic relationship with the photographer. The screenplay of Licorice Pizza evolved from this experience and additional stories told to Anderson by his friend Gary Goetzman, who was a child actor who had starred in the film Yours, Mine and Ours with Lucille Ball, appeared on The Ed Sullivan Show, and eventually started a waterbed company and pinball arcade. Goetzman at one time delivered a waterbed to Jon Peters's home. Anderson considered Fast Times at Ridgemont High and American Graffiti as major influences in the making of Licorice Pizza.

Anderson received permission from Jon Peters to develop a character based on him, on the sole condition that Peters's favorite pick-up line ("Do you like peanut butter sandwiches?") was used, and Anderson went on to create a "monster version" of Peters based on 1970s Hollywood producers who had "a reputation for a lot of bravado and aggro energy."

In September 2021, the film was officially titled Licorice Pizza, named after a former chain of record shops in southern California. Anderson explained: "If there's two words that make me kind of have a Pavlovian response and memory of being a child and running around, it's 'licorice' and 'pizza' [...] It instantly takes me back to that time." He added that the words "seemed like a catch-all for the feeling of the film [...] that go well together and maybe capture a mood."

=== Casting ===
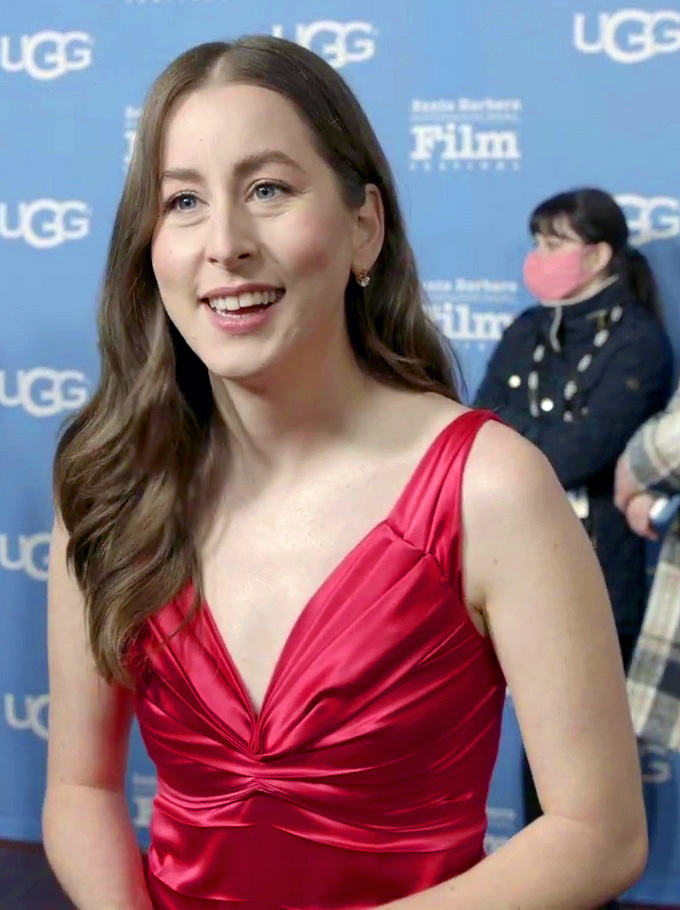
Alana Haim plays the lead role of Alana Kane, in her film debut.

Anderson wrote the screenplay with Alana Haim in mind and offered her the lead role in summer 2019. He has a close connection to her band Haim, having directed several of their music videos, and is a close friend of the Haim family. Haim's sisters Este and Danielle and parents Mordechai and Donna were also cast to play her character's family. Cooper Hoffman, the son of Philip Seymour Hoffman, was cast late in the process after Anderson found the young actors auditioning to be too "precocious" and "trained" to match the naturalistic style of Haim's acting. Licorice Pizza marks the feature film debut of both Haim and Hoffman. Described as a "family-and-friends project" by the Los Angeles Times, the film also features Anderson's longtime partner Maya Rudolph, their four children, and many of their neighborhood friends in various roles.

=== Filming ===
Principal photography began in Encino, California, in August 2020, under the working title Soggy Bottom which, in the film, is the initial name of Gary's waterbed business. In November 2020, it was reported that principal photography had wrapped and post-production had begun. A Tudor Revival manor previously owned by actor Lyle Waggoner was used for scenes at Jon Peters's house. Tail o' the Cock, a local restaurant that was demolished in 1987, was recreated for the film at the Van Nuys Golf Course. Haim spent a week learning to drive large trucks, and personally performed the stunt where her character backs the truck down a long hill.

Anderson and Michael Bauman (sharing a director of photography credit) shot Licorice Pizza on 35 mm film, using older lenses in order to create the film's 1970s texture.

=== Music ===
Radiohead's Jonny Greenwood composed the film's score cues. The first trailer for the film, which was released online on September 27, 2021, was set to David Bowie's "Life on Mars?," which also is featured in the film.

The film's official soundtrack was released by Republic Records. Included are many of the period songs featured in the film, as well as one of the original tracks composed by Greenwood.

== Release ==
In December 2019, Focus Features, which had financed and released Anderson's previous film Phantom Thread, came on to produce and distribute the film. However, in July 2020, it was reported that Metro-Goldwyn-Mayer had agreed to co-produce the film, and acquired the distribution rights from Focus, presumably due to budgetary issues, and that MGM would set a new start date due to the COVID-19 pandemic. In September 2021, the film's trailer and title were revealed at screenings of American Graffiti in London and in Los Angeles, before being released later that same month.

The film was released in select theaters in the United States by United Artists Releasing on November 26, 2021, followed by a nationwide release on December 25, 2021. It was released in the United Kingdom on January 14, 2022, by Universal Pictures.

=== Home media ===
Universal Pictures Home Entertainment released the film digitally on March 1, 2022, and on both Blu-ray and DVD on May 17.

== Reception ==
=== Box office ===
Licorice Pizza grossed $17.3 million in the United States and Canada, and $15.9 million in other territories, for a worldwide box office total of $33.2 million. Deadline Hollywood reported the film lost money for the studio, though did note it "brought a pulse to arthouses during a downbeat time."

The film opened in four theaters on November 26, 2021, including the Regency Village Theatre in Los Angeles. It made $335,000 its opening weekend, for an average of $83,800 per screen.

Its fifth weekend, the film expanded to 786 theaters and entered the box office top ten for the first time with $1.9 million, finishing eighth. During the weekend, 66% of audience members were between the ages of 18 and 34. The film made $1.3 million its sixth weekend, $981,886 its seventh, $879,511 its eighth, $659,953 its ninth, $630,117 its tenth, and $644,699 its eleventh.

After earning its three Academy Award nominations, the film was expanded to 1,977 total theaters and made $959,788 over its twelfth weekend, finishing ninth at the box office. It dropped out of the top ten its thirteenth weekend of release, grossing $647,973.

=== Critical response ===
On the review aggregator website Rotten Tomatoes, 90% of 326 critics' reviews are positive, with an average rating of 8.3/10. The website's consensus reads: "Licorice Pizza finds Paul Thomas Anderson shifting into a surprisingly comfortable gear – and getting potentially star-making performances out of his fresh-faced leads." Metacritic, which uses a weighted average, assigned the film a score of 90 out of 100, based on 55 critics, indicating "universal acclaim". Audiences polled by PostTrak gave the film an 87% positive score, with 73% saying they would definitely recommend it. In June 2025, IndieWire ranked the film at number 35 on its list of "The 100 Best Movies of the 2020s (So Far)."

=== Accolades ===
Licorice Pizza was nominated in three categories at the 94th Academy Awards (Best Picture, Best Director, and Best Original Screenplay), in four at the 79th Golden Globe Awards (Best Picture – Musical or Comedy, Best Actor – Musical or Comedy, Best Actress – Musical or Comedy, and Best Screenplay), and in five at the 75th British Academy Film Awards (Best Film, Best Actress, Best Director, Best Original Screenplay, and Best Editing), with Paul Thomas Anderson winning Original Screenplay. The film was ranked second on Cahiers du Cinéma's list of the top 10 films of 2022.
