= Adam Somner =

British and American assistant director and film producer (1967–2024)

- Somner in 2011
- Born: March 21, 1967; London, England
- Died: November 27, 2024 (aged 57); Los Angeles, California, U.S.
- Occupations: Assistant director, film producer
- Notable work: Licorice Pizza; One Battle After Another

Adam Somner (March 21, 1967 – November 27, 2024) was a British and American assistant director and film producer. An assistant director since 2003 who started to produce some of the films on which he was assistant director on in 2010, he worked multiple times with Martin Scorsese, Steven Spielberg, Alejandro González Iñárritu, Ridley Scott, and Paul Thomas Anderson.

As a producer, Somner was nominated twice for the Academy Award for Best Picture for the Anderson-directed Licorice Pizza (2021) and One Battle After Another (2025), winning posthumously for the latter.

== Early life ==
Somner was born in London on March 21, 1967.

== Career ==
He produced Anderson's Licorice Pizza (2021), which was nominated for an Academy Award for Best Picture, a BAFTA Award for Best Film, Producers Guild of America Award for Best Theatrical Motion Picture, and a Golden Globe Award for Best Motion Picture – Musical or Comedy. One Battle After Another (2025) was his final work and is dedicated in his memory.

== Death ==
Somner died from anaplastic thyroid cancer in Studio City, Los Angeles, California, on November 27, 2024, at the age of 57.

== Filmography ==
=== Film ===
Year	Title	First AD	Producer	Director	Notes	Ref.
2003	Johnny English	Yes	No	Peter Howitt		
2003	Seabiscuit	Yes	No	Gary Ross		
2005	Kingdom of Heaven	Yes	No	Ridley Scott		
2005	War of the Worlds	Yes	No	Steven Spielberg		
2005	Munich	Yes	No	Steven Spielberg		
2007	There Will Be Blood	Yes	No	Paul Thomas Anderson		
2007	Lions for Lambs	Yes	No	Robert Redford		
2008	Indiana Jones and the Kingdom of the Crystal Skull	Yes	No	Steven Spielberg		
2010	Unstoppable	Yes	Co-producer	Tony Scott		
2011	Rango	Yes	No	Gore Verbinski		
2011	The Adventures of Tintin	Yes	Associate producer	Steven Spielberg		
2011	War Horse	Yes	Co-producer	Steven Spielberg		
2012	The Master	Yes	Executive	Paul Thomas Anderson		
2012	Lincoln	Yes	Co-producer	Steven Spielberg		
2013	The Wolf of Wall Street	Yes	Co-producer	Martin Scorsese		
2014	Birdman	Yes	No	Alejandro González Iñárritu		
2014	Inherent Vice	Yes	Executive	Paul Thomas Anderson		
2014	Exodus: Gods and Kings	No	Co-producer	Ridley Scott		
2015	Bridge of Spies	Yes	Executive	Steven Spielberg		
2015	The Revenant	Yes	No	Alejandro González Iñárritu		
2016	The BFG	Yes	Co-producer	Steven Spielberg		
2017	First They Killed My Father	Yes	Executive	Angelina Jolie		
2017	Phantom Thread	Yes	Executive	Paul Thomas Anderson		
2017	The Post	Yes	Executive	Steven Spielberg		
2017	All the Money in the World	Yes	No	Ridley Scott		
2018	Ready Player One	Yes	Executive	Steven Spielberg		
2019	Ford v Ferrari	Yes	Co-producer	James Mangold		
2021	Licorice Pizza	Yes	Yes	Paul Thomas Anderson		
2021	West Side Story	Yes	Executive	Steven Spielberg		
2023	Killers of the Flower Moon	Yes	Executive	Martin Scorsese		
2023	The Wonderful Story of Henry Sugar	Yes	No	Wes Anderson	Short film	
2024	Blitz	Yes	Yes	Steve McQueen		
2025	One Battle After Another	Yes	Yes	Paul Thomas Anderson	Posthumous release	
2026	Disclosure Day	No	Executive	Steven Spielberg	Posthumous release	

== Awards and nominations ==
Award	Year	Category	Work	Result	Ref.
AACTA International Awards	2022	Best Film	Licorice Pizza	Nominated	
Academy Awards	2022	Best Picture	Licorice Pizza	Nominated	
Academy Awards	2026	Best Picture	One Battle After Another	Won	
Astra Creative Arts Awards	2025	Best Second Unit Director	One Battle After Another	Won	
British Academy Film Awards	2022	Best Film	Licorice Pizza	Nominated	
British Academy Film Awards	2026	Best Film	One Battle After Another	Won	
Christopher Award	2012	Best Feature Film	War Horse	Won	
Christopher Award	2013	Best Feature Film	Lincoln	Won	
Gotham Awards	2025	Best Feature	One Battle After Another	Won	
Producers Guild of America Awards	2022	Best Theatrical Motion Picture	Licorice Pizza	Nominated	
Producers Guild of America Awards	2026	Best Theatrical Motion Picture	One Battle After Another	Won	

== See also ==
- List of Academy Award winners and nominees from Great Britain
- List of posthumous Academy Award winners and nominees
