= Dan and Stacy Chariton =

American screenwriters

Dan and Stacy Chariton are screenwriters of the 2013 film The English Teacher, starring Julianne Moore, Nathan Lane, Greg Kinnear, Michael Angarano and Lily Collins, which premiered at the 2013 Tribeca Film Festival. They met as undergraduates at the USC School of Cinema-Television, where they studied under professor John Furia, Jr.

Their first creative collaboration was a 14-issue run of "The Silver Surfer," published by Marvel Comics. Their storyline portrayed the Silver Surfer as a terrifying and inscrutable cosmic being, "kidnapping" gifted human children to protect them from an imminent global catastrophe.

The English Teacher is their first produced film. They are married and live in Los Angeles.

Dan voice-acted in the 2025 film One Battle After Another as Comrade Josh, a rebel who speaks to the protagonist on the phone.
