= Michael Bauman (cinematographer) =

American cinematographer

- Born: Wisconsin, U.S.
- Education: American Film Institute (MFA)
- Occupation: Cinematographer
- Years active: 1993–present

Michael Bauman is an American cinematographer, best known for collaboration with director Paul Thomas Anderson, with his work on One Battle After Another (2025) earning him a nomination for the Academy Award for Best Cinematography.

== Career ==
After graduating from the American Film Institute's cinematography program in 1992, Bauman began his career in the film industry working as a lighting technician on music videos and feature films. He took over as gaffer near the end of filming for Stuart Little (1999).

In addition, Bauman also co-founded LiteGear, a manufacturer of lighting products.

Bauman began working with Paul Thomas Anderson as the gaffer on The Master (2012) and Inherent Vice (2014).

On Phantom Thread (2017), Anderson declined to hire his longtime cinematographer Robert Elswit. According to Anderson, Phantom Thread did not have a traditional cinematographer during production, and the duty was shared among him and several crew members including Bauman (who was credited as the "lighting cameraman"), and no cinematography credit is given in the final film.

Bauman worked with Anderson on his next two films, as co-cinematographer on Licorice Pizza (2021) and sole cinematographer on One Battle After Another (2025), for which he was nominated for the Academy Award for Best Cinematography.

== Filmography ==
=== Feature film ===
Year	Title	Director	Notes
2017	Phantom Thread	Paul Thomas Anderson	Credited as "lighting cameraman"
2021	Licorice Pizza	Paul Thomas Anderson	Shared credit with Anderson
2025	One Battle After Another	Paul Thomas Anderson	
2026	Tony	Matt Johnson	
2027	Paris Paramount †	Nancy Meyers	Post-production

=== Television ===
Year	Title	Director	Notes
2023–2024	American Horror Stories	Max Winkler; Alexis Martin Woodall; David Gelb	Episodes: "Bestie", "Tapeworm" and "Backrooms"
2024	Feud	Max Winkler; Jennifer Lynch	Episodes: "The Secret Inner Lives of Swans" and "Beautiful Babe"
2025	Monster: The Ed Gein Story	Max Winkler	6 episodes
2026	Monster: The Lizzie Borden Story	Max Winkler	6 episodes
