= Stranger Things (Yuck album) =

Studio album by Yuck
- Released: 26 February 2016
- Recorded: 2015 (London)
- Genres: Indie rock, alternative rock
- Length: 46:10
- Language: English
- Label: Mamé Records
- Producer: Max Bloom

Yuck chronology
Southern Skies (2014)	Stranger Things (2016)

Singles from Stranger Things
- 1. "Hold Me Closer" Released: 8 July 2015; 2. "Hearts in Motion" Released: 12 January 2016; 3. "Cannonball" Released: 2 February 2016

Stranger Things is the third and final studio album by UK-based indie rock band Yuck, released on Mamé Records on 26 February 2016. The album was produced by frontman Max Bloom over a period of several months in 2015 in his parents' house in London. The album's release was preceded by three singles: "Hold Me Closer"; "Hearts in Motion"; and "Cannonball".

== Background and recording ==
In April 2013, original lead singer and guitarist Daniel Blumberg left the band. Guitarist Max Bloom subsequently took over duties as frontman and the band was joined by guitarist Ed Hayes as an official member that August. Yuck released its sophomore studio album Glow & Behold on Fat Possum Records on 30 September 2013 to mixed reviews.

After touring in support of Glow & Behold, the band self-released the Southern Skies EP in April 2014. Yuck signed with indie label Mamé Records in 2015 and released the single "Hold Me Closer" on 8 July via SoundCloud the same year.

On 12 January 2016, Yuck announced the album title as Stranger Things and release date of 26 February. The same day, Yuck revealed the album artwork, released the second single, "Hearts in Motion", and announced a North American spring tour. In an accompanying press release, Bloom stated: "[The band] basically spent no money on the record and it was a really relaxed way of doing things[.]" The album was recorded in London primarily in Bloom's parents' house where Yuck had previously recorded its 2011 self-titled debut album. The band recorded the drum tracks at a nearby rehearsal studio. The band posted a video announcing pre-orders for the album on its official YouTube channel three days later.

On 2 February 2016, "Cannonball" was released as the third single from the album.

== Composition ==
‘Hearts In Motion’ is a song about how we deal with relationships. We’re all just blasting through space on a huge rock, so what’s the point in maintaining a relationship? Is it all just doomed to failure, or is it the one thing that we should be holding on to the most in this world? Who knows!

— Max Bloom, regarding the lyrical content of the second single

Stranger Things is a departure from the softer, shoegaze-esque sound of the Southern Skies EP. The album was inspired by "UK postpunk" and 90's alternative rock bands such as Dinosaur Jr. and Built to Spill. Max Bloom described the songs "Swirling", "Like a Moth", and "I'm OK" as "remarkably gentle" and referred to the latter as "a very personal song because it's just about the anxiety I've been feeling over the last couple of years[.]" Bassist Mariko Doi performs lead vocals on the song "As I Walk Away", which, according to Bloom, was "quite influenced" by her solo work. Chris DeVille from Stereogum favorably compared "Hearts in Motion" to Transmissions from the Satellite Heart-era Flaming Lips, while Tom Breihan from the same website described "Cannonball" as "a blazing, amped-up blast of fuzz-guitar tunefulness[.]" Writing for the webzine Overblown, Jamie Coughlan referred to the lead single "Hold Me Closer" as "euphoric".

== Release and promotion ==
On 17 February 2016, about a week before the album's official release, Stranger Things became available for streaming via NPR. The previous day, Yuck uploaded a live performance of "Hearts in Motion", with James Thomas from Parakeet (Mariko Doi's side-project) temporarily filling in for Jonny Rogoff on drums. The band announced spring tour dates in the United Kingdom in support of the album and uploaded a short promotional comedic video on YouTube of the band member's fathers recommending purchasing the album.

== Critical reception ==
Professional ratings
Review scores
Source	Rating
AllMusic	3.5/5 stars
Consequence of Sound	C+
DIY	4/5 stars
Exclaim!	6/10
Paste	8.2/10
Pitchfork	5.2/10
PopMatters	6/10
Slant	1.5/5 stars

Stranger Things has received mixed to positive reviews. On Metacritic, the album has a normalized score of 62 out of 100 based on 21 reviews, indicating "generally favorable reviews". El Hunt from DIY gave Stranger Things four out of five stars, writing "Yuck craft their most immediate, and inescapable record to date[.]" Jesse Nee-Vogelman from Slant gave the album a negative review, calling the album "often little more than a poor imitation of [Yuck's] earlier sound." In a mixed review for Exclaim!, Pierre John Felcenloben cited an "overemphasis on influences" that made the record "more recognizably likeable than imaginative."

== Track listing ==
All tracks are written by Yuck.

No.	Title	Length
1.	"Hold Me Closer"	3:49
2.	"Cannonball"	2:25
3.	"Like a Moth"	2:52
4.	"Only Silence"	3:52
5.	"Stranger Things"	5:07
6.	"I'm OK"	4:30
7.	"As I Walk Away"	4:17
8.	"Hearts in Motion"	3:22
9.	"Swirling"	5:29
10.	"Down"	4:09
11.	"Yr Face"	6:18
Total length:		46:10

== Personnel ==
Yuck

- Max Bloom – lead vocals, guitar
- Mariko Doi – bass, backing vocals, lead vocals on "As I Walk Away"
- Ed Hayes – guitar
- Jonny Rogoff – drums
