= The Testament of Ann Lee (soundtrack) =

The Testament of Ann Lee (Original Motion Picture Soundtrack)

Soundtrack album by Daniel Blumberg
- Released: 16 January 2026
- Recorded: 2025
- Genres: Film soundtrack; Shaker music
- Length: 78:37
- Labels: Milan; Sony Masterworks; Mute
- Producer: Daniel Blumberg

Daniel Blumberg chronology
The Brutalist (Original Motion Picture Soundtrack) (2024)	The Testament of Ann Lee (Original Motion Picture Soundtrack) (2026)

Singles from The Testament of Ann Lee (Original Motion Picture Soundtrack)
- 1. "Clothed by Sun" Released: December 2, 2025; 2. "Hunger and Thirst" Released: December 16, 2025

The Testament of Ann Lee (Original Motion Picture Soundtrack) is the soundtrack album to the 2025 film The Testament of Ann Lee directed by Mona Fastvold, starring Amanda Seyfried. The soundtrack features the original score composed by Daniel Blumberg, as well as several musical numbers performed by the cast members, including three original songs written by Blumberg himself. The soundtrack was inspired by original Shaker hymns. It was released by Milan Records on 16 January 2026.

== Development ==
Composer Daniel Blumberg, who had worked previously with Fastvold in the 2020 film The World to Come, composed the score for The Testament of Ann Lee. He joined the project after completing the mixing of the score for The Brutalist (2024), for which he won an Academy Award for Best Original Score, and was involved from the pre-production stage itself. Although he had little familiarity with Shaker music, Blumberg read the script, found himself intrigued, and connected with the avant-garde improvisational singers Phil Minton, Maggie Nicols (who plays a Townley woman in the film), and Shelley Hirsch, while also being influenced by the Shaker hymns to write the score.

While keeping with the 18th century setting in mind, Blumberg used body sounds and bells but also incorporated contemporary sounds like the use of distorted electric guitars, which heard when an eclipse took place during one sermon, pushing the boundaries to an extreme level. Blumberg wrote around 100 minutes of score for the film.

In preparing for his original musical numbers for the film, Blumberg engaged in extensive discussions with Fastvold, cinematographer William Rexer, choreographer Celia Rowlson-Hall, the film's sound designers, and other members of the crew. The songs in the script were temporary placeholders where it occurs from natural and instrumental sounds, but he needed to discuss with the team so that the choreography, music, and on-screen elements should be in sync with the rhythm and grow together except being an individual entity. Except for Seyfried, none of the actors had previously been part of a musical; hence, Blumberg found it an experimental process in all senses.

Blumberg oversaw the singing and recorded them live with the actors. He compiled the studio recording and live singing at an Airbnb near the Budapest studio and for the chorus parts, and taught some of the Hungarian extras to sing the choral parts in English, in order to be more authentic. He also wrote a couple of original songs with Fastvold. The original song "Clothed by the Sun" was written as a last-minute addition, and recorded as a demo with his own vocals and guitar. Afterwards, he also recorded the song with Seyfried as a duet. Seyfried sang few of the songs in a most uninhibited manner, sometimes using animalistic sounds rather than conventionally melodic sounds, and felt that she did not have to sound beautiful in a way that was beautiful to her; the singing was more like a woman on her knees.

== Release ==
The soundtrack details were released on 15 December 2025, featuring 78 minutes of original music, including Blumberg's score, the adapted Shaker hymns performed by the cast members and musical numbers. The album was released on 16 January 2026 through Milan Records and Sony Masterworks in the United States and Mute Records globally. Two songs—"Clothed by the Sun" and "Hunger and Thirst"—preceded the album as singles, released on 2 and 16 December, respectively.

== Critical reception ==
Guy Lodge of Variety wrote that Blumberg had "artfully adapted [the songs] from old Shaker spirituals, embedded in a changeable, exhilarating soundscape of discordant strings, tingly metallic percussion and shrill choral wave." David Ehrlich of IndieWire wrote "Oscar-winning composer Daniel Blumberg transfigures a dozen traditional hymns into propulsive and electrifying choral jams that thrum with biblical fervor". David Rooney of The Hollywood Reporter wrote that Blumberg effectively adapted Shaker hymns, while he also noted that "the chiming notes of Blumberg’s score effectively introduces non-period electronic elements."

Wendy Ide of Screen International, however, said that, "unlike something like Emilia Perez, its musical numbers lack the range, variety and toe-tapping immediacy required to sear a song into the audience’s consciousness." Radhika Seth of Vogue called it "goosebump-inducing". Tori Brazier of Metro wrote "Daniel Blumberg – who won the Oscar for The Brutalist – has composed haunting and gorgeous melodies that are enough to put you into some sort of euphoric trance [...] The music is also near-continuous, propelling the film and giving it so much of its power". Bilge Ebiri of Vulture wrote "The music, much of it consisting of Shaker spirituals rearranged by Daniel Blumberg is lyrical, emotional, sometimes even angry."

== Accolades ==
Award	Date of ceremony	Category	Recipient(s)	Result	Ref.
Astra Film Awards	9 January 2026	Best Original Song	"Clothed by the Sun" (Music and Lyrics by Daniel Blumberg)	Nominated	
Austin Film Critics Association	18 December 2025	Best Original Score	Daniel Blumberg	Nominated	
Chicago Film Critics Association	11 December 2025	Best Original Score	Daniel Blumberg	Nominated	
Chicago Indie Critics Windie Award	15 January 2025	Best Song	"Clothed by the Sun" (Music and Lyrics by Daniel Blumberg)	Nominated	
Critics' Choice Awards	4 January 2026	Best Song	"Clothed by the Sun" (Music and Lyrics by Daniel Blumberg)	Nominated	
DiscussingFilm Global Critic Award	24 January 2026	Best Original Song	"Clothed by the Sun" (Music and Lyrics by Daniel Blumberg)	Nominated	
Dorian Awards	3 March 2026	Film Music of the Year	Daniel Blumberg	Nominated	
Las Vegas Film Critics Society	19 December 2025	Best Song	"Clothed by the Sun" (Music and Lyrics by Daniel Blumberg)	Nominated	
Midnight Critics Circle	1 February 2026	Best Original Song	"Clothed by the Sun" (Music and Lyrics by Daniel Blumberg)	Runner-up	
New York Film Critics Online	15 December 2025	Best Use of Music	Daniel Blumberg	Nominated	
North Dakota Film Society	12 January 2026	Best Original Song	"Clothed by the Sun" (Music and Lyrics by Daniel Blumberg)	Nominated	
Puerto Rico Critics Association	2 January 2026	Best Original Score	Daniel Blumberg	Nominated	
Puerto Rico Critics Association	2 January 2026	Best Original Song	"Clothed by the Sun" (Music and Lyrics by Daniel Blumberg)	Nominated	
St. Louis Film Critics Association	14 December 2025	Best Original Score	Daniel Blumberg	Runner-up	

== Track listing ==
All tracks are produced by Daniel Blumberg.

The Testament of Ann Lee (Original Motion Picture Soundtrack)
No.	Title	Lyrics	Music	Length
1.	"The Testament of Ann Lee" (with Thomasin McKenzie)	Blumberg; Mona Fastvold	Blumberg	2:19
2.	"Manchester"	Blumberg	Blumberg; Traditional	4:14
3.	"Hero Prayer One"	Blumberg	Blumberg	0:33
4.	"Walk to Infirmary"	Blumberg	Blumberg; Traditional	0:53
5.	"Infirmary"	Blumberg	Blumberg	0:27
6.	"Walk to Wardleys"		Blumberg	0:55
7.	"Wardleys" (featuring Maggie Nicols)		Blumberg	0:52
8.	"Worship" (with The Testament of Ann Lee Cast)	Blumberg; Traditional	Blumberg; Traditional	2:48
9.	"Sex Celeste"		Blumberg	1:33
10.	"Beautiful Treasures" (with Amanda Seyfried)	Blumberg; Traditional	Blumberg; Traditional	4:59
11.	"Search for Ann"	Blumberg	Blumberg	1:21
12.	"I Never Did Believe" (with Amanda Seyfried, Lewis Pullman, Scott Handy and Matthew Beard)	Blumberg	Blumberg; Traditional	4:11
13.	"Hunger and Thirst" (with Amanda Seyfried)	Blumberg; Traditional	Blumberg; Traditional	3:41
14.	"Ship"	Blumberg	Blumberg; Traditional	1:10
15.	"Lower Deck"		Blumberg; Traditional	1:49
16.	"Today Today" (with Viola Prettejohn and Jamie Bogyo)	Traditional	Blumberg; Traditional	2:05
17.	"Storm"	Blumberg	Blumberg	2:45
18.	"All Is Summer" (with Amanda Seyfried and The Testament of Ann Lee Cast)	Blumberg; Traditional	Blumberg; Traditional	2:42
19.	"Magical Boat Ride"		Blumberg	1:16
20.	"John's Running Song" (with David Cale and Lewis Pullman)	Blumberg; Fastvold	Blumberg	1:49
21.	"Whores"	Blumberg	Blumberg	2:14
22.	"Niskayuna"	Blumberg	Blumberg; Traditional	1:11
23.	"The Eclipse"		Blumberg; Traditional	2:10
24.	"Bow Down O Zion" (with Lewis Pullman)	Blumberg; Traditional	Blumberg; Traditional	2:44
25.	"Building and Growing"	Traditional	Blumberg; Traditional	1:54
26.	"William Walking"		Blumberg; Traditional	1:33
27.	"I Love Mother (Pretty Mother's Home)" (with The Testament of Ann Lee Cast)	Blumberg; Traditional	Blumberg; Traditional	4:59
28.	"Arrest"		Blumberg	1:05
29.	"Stone Prison" (with Amanda Seyfried)	Blumberg; Traditional	Blumberg; Traditional	1:33
30.	"Shattuck"	Blumberg	Blumberg	6:13
31.	"Down to the Deep" (with Amanda Seyfried)	Blumberg; Traditional	Blumberg; Traditional	2:41
32.	"Beautiful Treasures Funeral" (with The Testament of Ann Lee Cast)	Blumberg; Traditional	Blumberg; Traditional	3:21
33.	"Clothed by the Sun" (with Amanda Seyfried)	Blumberg	Blumberg	3:37
Total length:				78:37

Notes

- "Beautiful Treasures" and "Beautiful Treasures Funeral" are rearrangements of the traditional Shaker hymn "O, the Beautiful Treasures".
- "I Never Did Believe", "All Is Summer", "Bow Down O Zion" and "Stone Prison" are rearrangements of the traditional Shaker hymns of the same names.
- "Hunger and Thirst" is a rearrangement of the traditional Shaker hymn "I Hunger and Thirst".
- "Today Today" is a rearrangement of the traditional Shaker hymn "Today, Today Is My Own Time".
- "I Love Mother (Pretty Mother's Home)" is a rearrangement of the traditional Shaker hymns "I Love Mother, I Love Her Way" and "Pretty Mother's Home".
- "Down to the Deep" is a rearrangement of the traditional Shaker hymn "Down to the Deep and Rolling River".

== Charts ==
Chart performance for The Testament of Ann Lee (Original Motion Picture Soundtrack)
Chart (2026)	Peak position
UK Soundtrack Albums (Official Charts)	29
