= The World to Come (soundtrack) =

The World to Come (Original Motion Picture Soundtrack)

Film score by Daniel Blumberg
- Released: February 10, 2021 (digital); February 16, 2021 (physical)
- Recorded: 2020–2021
- Studio: Visconti Studio, Kingston University, London; Das Loch, Mannheim; The Bomb Shelter, Nashville, Tennessee
- Genre: Film score
- Length: 53:12
- Label: Mute
- Producer: Daniel Blumberg; Peter Walsh

Daniel Blumberg chronology
GUO4 (2019)	The World to Come (2021)	The Brutalist (2024)

The World to Come (Original Motion Picture Soundtrack) is the film score to the 2021 film The World to Come directed by Mona Fastvold and starring Katherine Waterston, Vanessa Kirby, Christopher Abbott, and Casey Affleck. The film score is composed by Daniel Blumberg who co-produced the score with Peter Walsh. The album released through Mute Records digitally on February 10, 2021, followed by a physical release, six days later.

== Development ==
The film score is composed by English musician Daniel Blumberg. He was recommended by music producer Peter Walsh to Mona Fastvoid, whom Blumberg considered as a good friend and understanding the type of music he was doing as an artist. It was his first composition for a feature film.

After reading the script, Blumberg went to Romania to observe the film's shooting so that he could generate his ideas for the music and ensured that he was connected to the wider creative team where he felt as a part of an ensemble. Despite being new to film composition, he added that there was huge amount of trust at its center, despite pressures with deadlines and administrative stuff but also having the ability to nestle into the work.

He built an ensemble which consisted of his collaborators—clarinetist Peter Brötzmann, vocalist Josephine Foster, cellist Ute Kannegiesser, percussionist Steve Noble—to perform the score. Much of the score was recorded in Blumberg's flat while additional sessions were held at the Visconti Studio located at the Kingston University in London. The intervals where the ensemble downed the instruments helped in shaping the overall direction, as he found those moments which brought it to life, as opposed to the texture and musical anecdotes and had to lean on these things while improvising.

Throughout the process, Blumberg learnt new musical concepts while improvising the score, which involves recording hour-long performance from Alex Ward on playing clarinet, and with Fastvold listening to his performances, Blumberg would go on with a certain part which she liked, so that it could help her find a language for the score. One of the major challenges for Blumberg and Walsh came when incorporating clarinet with a voice over as both sounds carried the same occupancy. However, Blumberg who acknowledged Walsh's mixing work in his collaborations with Scott Walker, also admitted that they spent a lot of time on mixing clarinets with the vocals in order to be perfect.

Besides writing the score, Blumberg also wrote and performed an original song, which was the title track, performed by Josephine Foster that featured in the end credits.

== Release ==
The original soundtrack was released through Mute Records digitally on February 10, 2021, and in CDs and double LPs on February 16.

== Reception ==
Charlie Brigden of The Quietus wrote "Perhaps that sums up The World to Come: there's so much passion under the surface that Blumberg presents that some form of purging is not only needed, it's inevitable." Daniel Spicer of Jazzwise wrote "The general mood is elegiac, with slow-moving themes gently sketched in concise vignettes for clarinets and strings." Luke Cartledge of Loud and Quiet called it as "yet another rewardingly confident new venture for Daniel Blumberg." Tomris Laffly of RogerEbert.com stated "Daniel Blumberg's moody score of affecting woodwinds and strings tries to fill in for some of that shortage." Guy Lodge of Variety called It "a marvelous score by avant-garde British musician Daniel Blumberg [which] is full of unexpected woodwind breezes and sharp percussive intrusions."

Elizabeth Weitzman of TheWrap stated, "Daniel Blumberg's doleful score is well-suited, but it's the layers of incessant diegetic sound — squealing animals, chiming cowbells, whistling wind — that are most impactful." Jonathan Romney of Screen International wrote "There is also a distinctive score by David Blumberg, foregrounding woodwinds - notably in the blizzard sequence, which has a feel of free jazz without being incongruous for the period (improvising legend Peter Brötzmann is featured on bass clarinet). The closing song, featuring singer Josephine Foster, catches the period feel perfectly over manuscript-style end credits." Jon Frosch of The Hollywood Reporter wrote "Daniel Blumberg's supple score, by turns mournful, playfully jazzy and full of roiling menace, is one of several other contributions that collectively create an impression of sensitive craftsmanship."

Ben Kenigsberg of The New York Times described it as an "offbeat, clarinet-heavy score". Ella Kemp of Empire wrote "a swooning score by Daniel Blumberg adds another dimension to the sadness of the picture." Katie Goh of Little White Lies called the score "emotive". Clarisse Loughrey of The Independent called it an "expressive jazz score". It has been considered as one of the best film scores of 2021 by IndieWire.

== Track listing ==
No.	Title	Length
1.	"Opening (Dyer's Farmhouse)"	2:40
2.	"Nellie"	0:59
3.	"Abigail's Walk"	1:18
4.	"Tallie"	3:18
5.	"Flummoxed"	0:38
6.	"Chicken Plucking"	1:56
7.	"The Storm"	4:08
8.	"Falling in Love"	4:07
9.	"First Kiss"	1:40
10.	"The Orchard"	3:27
11.	"The Woods"	1:36
12.	"Spying House"	1:23
13.	"Thoughts and Township"	3:09
14.	"The Fire"	1:06
15.	"Empty House"	1:43
16.	"Tallie Missing"	1:53
17.	"Finny Letter"	1:53
18.	"Atlas"	1:04
19.	"The Wagon"	3:34
20.	"Love and Death"	4:37
21.	"Rooftop"	1:22
22.	"The World to Come" (Daniel Blumberg and Josephine Foster)	5:41
Total length:		53:12

== Personnel ==
Credits adapted from liner notes:

- Music composer and engineer – Daniel Blumberg
- Producer – Daniel Blumberg, Peter Walsh
- Arrangements – Tom Wheatley
- Recording – Jack Tellmann, Peter Walsh
- Mixing and mastering – Peter Walsh
- Soundtrack coordinator – Rocquel Berry
- Executive producer – Tracy McKnight
- Management – Mark Slater
- Graphic design – Paul A. Taylor
- Photography – Vlad Cioplea

Musicians

- Bass clarinet – Yoni Silver, Peter Brötzmann
- Cello – Ute Kanngiesser
- Clarinet – Alex Ward, Daniel Blumberg, Peter Brötzmann
- Cowbell – Steve Noble
- Double bass – Tom Wheatley
- Violin – Billy Steiger
- Voice – Josephine Foster

== Accolades ==
Awards	Date of ceremony	Category	Recipient(s) and nominee(s)	Result	Ref.
Ivor Novello Awards	May 19, 2022	Best Original Film Score	Daniel Blumberg	Won	
