= Yuck (band) =

British rock band (2009–2021)

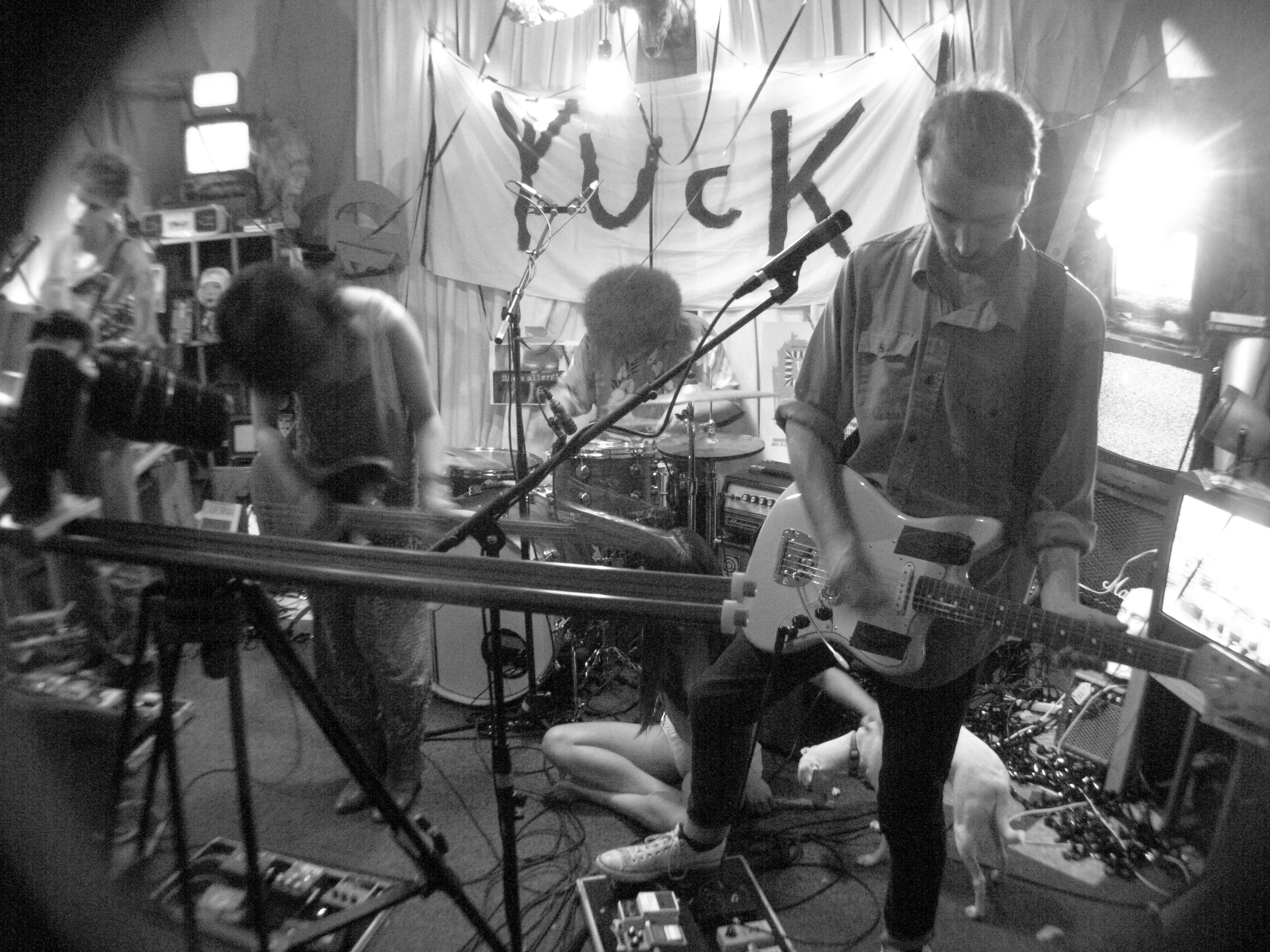
- Yuck in 2011

Background information
- Origin: London, England
- Genres: Slacker rock, indie rock, noise rock
- Years active: 2009–2021
- Labels: Mercury; Fat Possum; Mamé
- Spinoff of: Cajun Dance Party
- Past members: Daniel Blumberg; Max Bloom; Mariko Doi; Jonny Rogoff; Ed Hayes
- Website: yuckband.com

Yuck was a British rock band from London that formed in 2009. The band was founded by vocalist-guitarists Daniel Blumberg and Max Bloom after they both left the band Cajun Dance Party, alongside bassist Mariko Doi and drummer Jonny Rogoff.

The band's self-titled debut album was released through Fat Possum on 21 February 2011 in the United Kingdom. Lead vocalist Blumberg left Yuck in 2013, and Bloom took over the position beginning with the band's second album.

Critics have likened Yuck to bands such as Dinosaur Jr., the Smashing Pumpkins, Pavement, My Bloody Valentine and Sonic Youth.

== History ==
Daniel Blumberg and Max Bloom left their previous group Cajun Dance Party in 2008. They formed Yuck in 2009 in London, England. The group began recording its debut studio album in the summer of the 2010 in London in Max Bloom's parents' house. The band toured with Modest Mouse, Tame Impala, and Unknown Mortal Orchestra.

On 12 April 2012, the band released the non-album track "Chew" via their official SoundCloud page. On 23 October 2012, their song “Get Away” from their debut album was featured in the soundtrack for Forza Horizon. Their Song "get away" was on The BMX video featuring Pro rider Marcel Andersen riding for Cult Crew in a Youtube video titled: CULTCREW/ MARCEL/ 2022

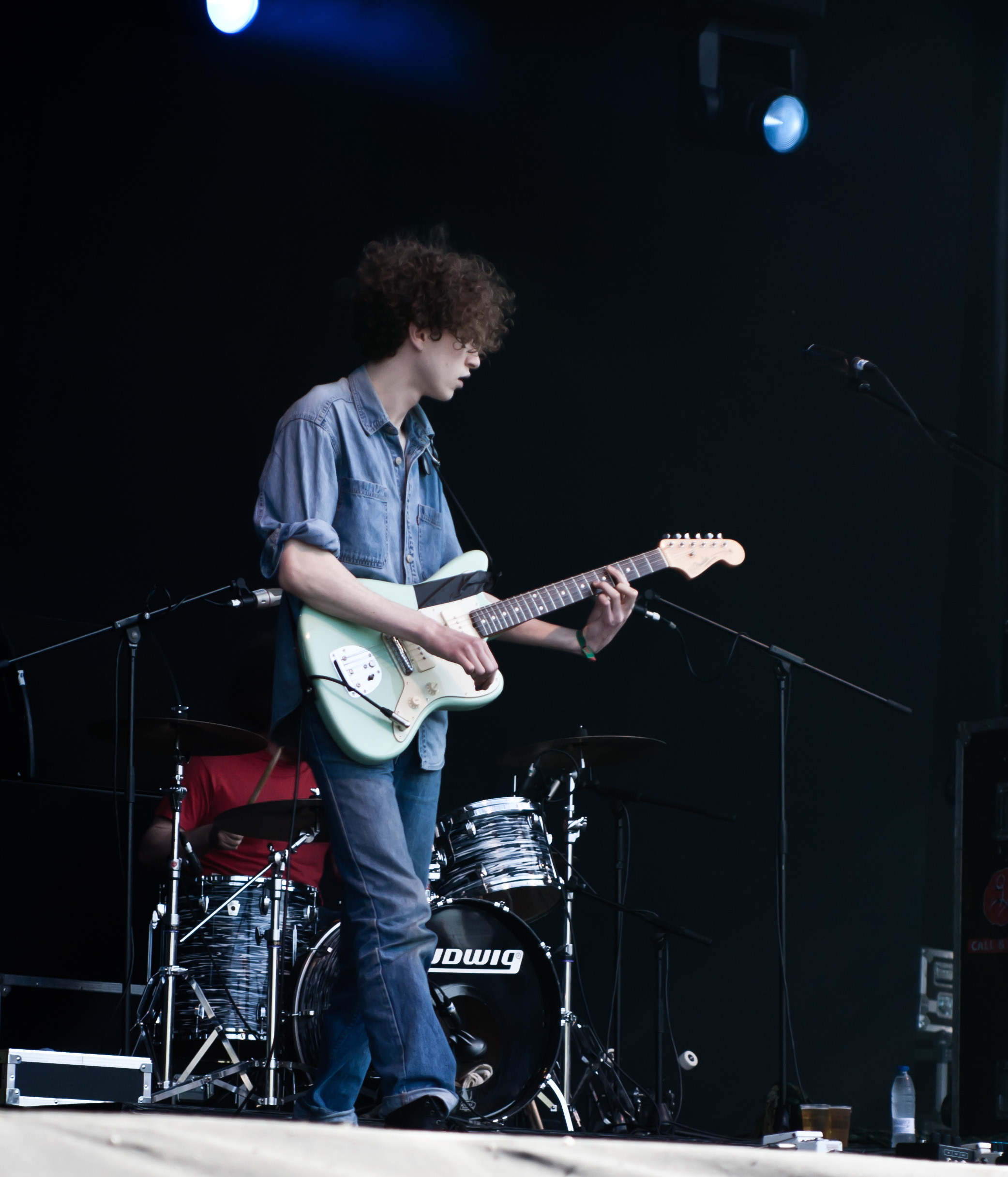
Blumberg performing at Primavera Sound 2011 with Yuck

On 15 April 2013, Yuck revealed on their official Facebook page that they would be recording their second album in late April. They also revealed that Daniel Blumberg had left the band to concentrate on releasing his own music.

On 18 July 2013, Yuck released a new song, "Rebirth", and it was made available for free download via their official website.

On 13 August 2013, Huw Stephens debuted Yuck's new single, "Middle Sea", on Radio 1. The new album was revealed to be titled Glow & Behold during an interview with lead singer Max Bloom. It was released on 30 September 2013.

On 5 September 2013, Yuck posted a video of a live recording of New Order's "Age of Consent". The video was recorded 30 August 2013 by Michael Lawrence in RAK Studios, along with some other songs. This track would become the B-side to the "Middle Sea" single. New member and guitarist Ed Hayes plays on the track.

On 23 January 2014, at a performance in Portland, Oregon, Yuck announced an EP. They played a new song from the EP after the announcement. The Southern Skies EP was released in April 2014.

On 8 July 2015, Yuck released their first single since the release of the Southern Skies EP entitled "Hold Me Closer". On 12 January 2016 the band released a new single, "Hearts in Motion", taken from their third studio album Stranger Things, released on 26 February 2016.

On 15 February 2021 the band posted a message to their Facebook page to announce that they would no longer be touring or making new music together.

== Influences ==
Yuck cited influences including Neutral Milk Hotel, Sonic Youth, Superchunk, Flaming Lips, Grandaddy, Sleater-Kinney, Wilco, Yo La Tengo, Super Furry Animals, Built To Spill, Teenage Fanclub, Dinosaur Jr., Caitlin Rose and My Bloody Valentine, A Grave With No Name and Video Nasties. In their later music, they took influence from Car Seat Headrest, Julien Baker, Lucy Dacus, Phoebe Bridgers and Julia Jacklin.

== Discography ==
=== Studio albums ===
- Yuck (2011)
- Glow & Behold (2013)
- Stranger Things (2016)

=== EPs ===
- Southern Skies (2014)

=== Singles ===
Year	Single	Album
2010	"Rubber" (vinyl only)	Yuck
2010	"Georgia" (vinyl only)	Yuck
2011	"Holing Out"	Yuck
2011	"Get Away"	Yuck
2011	"The Wall"	Yuck
2011	"Shook Down"/"Milkshake"	Yuck
2012	"Chew"	non-album single
2013	"Rebirth"	Glow & Behold
2013	"Middle Sea"	Glow & Behold
2013	"Lose My Breath"	Glow & Behold
2014	"Southern Skies"	Southern Skies
2015	"Hold Me Closer"	Stranger Things
2016	"Hearts in Motion"	Stranger Things
2016	"Cannonball"	Stranger Things

== Members ==
Final lineup

- Max Bloom – lead guitar, vocals (2009–2021)
- Mariko Doi – bass, vocals (2009–2021)
- Jonny Rogoff – drums (2009–2021)
- Ed Hayes – rhythm guitar (2013–2021)

Former members

- Daniel Blumberg – vocals, rhythm guitar (2009–2013)
- Ilana Blumberg – vocals (2009–2013)
