= Amanda Seyfried =

American actress (born 1985)

- Seyfried in 2026
- Born: Amanda Michelle Seyfried; December 3, 1985 (age 40); Allentown, Pennsylvania, U.S.
- Occupation: Actress
- Years active: 1996–present
- Spouse: Thomas Sadoski (m. 2017; sep. 2026)
- Children: 2
- Awards: Full list

Amanda Michelle Seyfried (/ˈsaɪfrɛd/ SY-fred; born December 3, 1985) is an American actress. Her accolades include a Golden Globe Award and a Primetime Emmy Award, as well as a nomination for an Academy Award. Named one of the 100 most influential people in the world by Time in 2022, her films as a leading actress have grossed over $2.4 billion worldwide.

Seyfried began acting at age 15, with recurring roles on the soap operas As the World Turns and All My Children. She made her film debut with her role as Karen Smith in the cult classic teen comedy Mean Girls (2004). Her profile continued to grow with leading roles in Mamma Mia! (2008), Jennifer's Body (2009), Dear John (2010), In Time (2011), Ted 2 (2015), and The Housemaid (2025). She earned critical acclaim for her performances as Cosette in Les Misérables (2012), Linda Lovelace in Lovelace (2013), Mary Mensana in First Reformed (2017), and Ann Lee in The Testament of Ann Lee (2025). For her portrayal of Marion Davies in the biographical drama Mank (2020), she received a nomination for the Academy Award for Best Supporting Actress.

On television, Seyfried found further success by portraying Sarah Henrickson in HBO's Big Love (2006–2011) and Elizabeth Holmes in the Hulu limited series The Dropout (2022), winning the Golden Globe and Primetime Emmy Award for Outstanding Lead Actress for the latter. She has since led the Apple TV psychological thriller The Crowded Room (2023) and the Peacock crime drama Long Bright River (2025).

== Early life ==
Amanda Michelle Seyfried was born in Allentown, Pennsylvania, on December 3, 1985. Her mother, Ann Seyfried (née Sander), was an occupational therapist, and her father, Jack Seyfried, was a pharmacist. Seyfried is of German ancestry, and has an older sister, Jennifer, who was a musician and member of a rock band. Seyfried started modeling at age eight, signing with Image International in Allentown and later with Pro Model in Bethlehem.

Seyfried attended William Allen High School, a large public school in Allentown. There, she pursued art and piano lessons and was involved in high school theater productions. She also expressed an interest in singing. She enrolled at Fordham University in New York City in 2003, but chose not to attend after being offered a leading role in the film Mean Girls (2004).

== Career ==
=== 1990s: Early roles ===
While attending William Allen High School in Allentown, Seyfried began modeling. She appeared in several print ads for clothing companies, including Limited Too with Leighton Meester, and was featured on three covers of the Sweet Valley High novel series. At age 17 she stopped modeling and started a job as a waitress in a retirement community. While still a teen, she took vocal lessons, studied opera, trained with a Broadway coach, and began her acting career as an extra in Guiding Light, a daytime television drama. From 2000 to 2001 she played the recurring character Lucy Montgomery on the CBS soap opera As the World Turns and, from 2002 to 2003, Joni Stafford on the ABC soap All My Children.

=== 2000s: Mainstream popularity ===
In 2003, Seyfried auditioned to play Regina George in Mean Girls, but the role eventually went to Rachel McAdams. While she was initially considered for the lead role of Cady Heron, ultimately played by Lindsay Lohan, the film's producers decided that Seyfried should play Karen Smith, Regina's dim-witted "plastic" friend and sidekick. The film was a box office success, grossing over $130 million in its theatrical run. Seyfried's performance in the film earned her, along with Lohan, Lacey Chabert, and McAdams, an MTV Movie Award in the category of "Best On-Screen Team".

Seyfried then auditioned to play the title character on UPN's television series Veronica Mars. The role eventually went to Kristen Bell, and Seyfried portrayed Veronica's murdered best friend Lilly Kane. Her character was only shown in flashbacks. In 2005, she played the lead character Samantha, a role written by director Rodrigo García specifically for her, in one of the nine parts of the film Nine Lives, composed of nine short films with different themes and an ensemble cast. For her performance, Seyfried, along with the film's other female leads, won the role Best Actress at the Locarno International Film Festival. That year, she played the supporting character Mouse in the independent film American Gun. In 2006, she appeared in five episodes of Wildfire as Rebecca and played the lead role Chrissy in the short film Gypsies, Tramps & Thieves, written and directed by Andrea Janakas. She also contributed in a minor role as Julie Beckley in Alpha Dog. From 2004 to 2006, she made multiple guest appearances on several television series, including House, Justice, Law & Order: Special Victims Unit, American Dad! and CSI: Crime Scene Investigation.

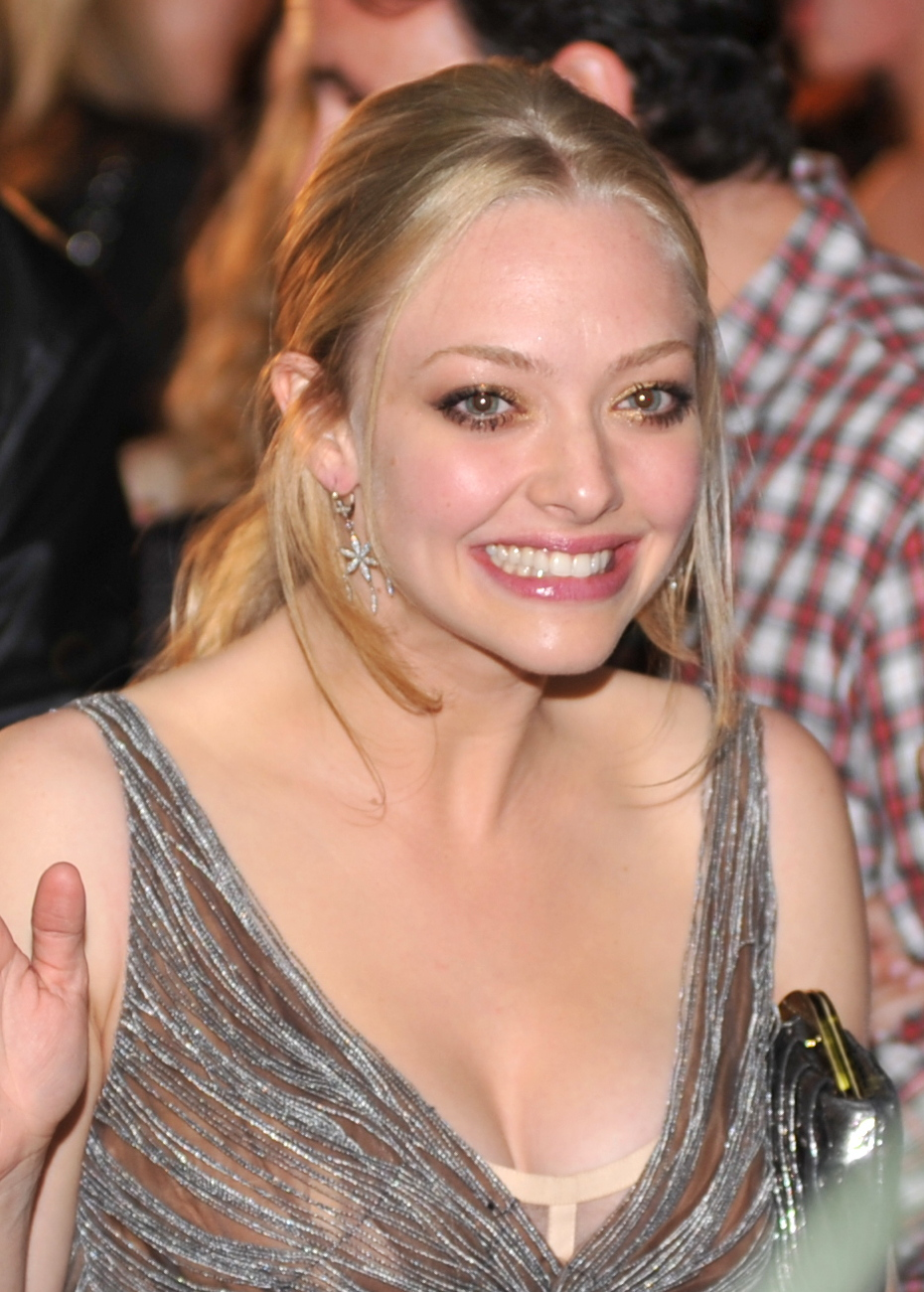
Seyfried at the premiere of Jennifer's Body in 2009

With her role in the HBO drama television series Big Love, Seyfried's profile as an actress grew substantially; the series centered on a fictional fundamentalist Mormon family in which Seyfried plays Sarah Henrickson, Bill and Barb's first daughter, who struggles with her family's polygamous faith. Big Love premiered in the United States on March 12, 2006. In December 2009, HBO confirmed that Seyfried would return for the show's fourth season, but that it would be her last since she wished to begin concentrating on her film career and other upcoming projects.

Following Big Love, Seyfried played a supporting role, as Zoe, in the 2008 horror drama film Solstice and co-starred with Meryl Streep in Mamma Mia!, a romantic comedy film adaptation of the 1999 musical of the same name. Mamma Mia!, which was Seyfried's first leading role, was the fifth highest-grossing film of 2008, and, as of February 2021, the 159th highest-grossing film of all time. Five songs from her musical performance in Mamma Mia! were released on the film's soundtrack.

In March 2008, Seyfried was cast in the comedy horror film Jennifer's Body as Anita "Needy" Lesnicki, the title character's best friend. The film, which premiered at the 2009 Toronto International Film Festival and was released to theaters on September 18, 2009, received mixed reviews from critics. The same year she was cast in the comedy drama independent film Boogie Woogie. She played Paige Oppenheimer, one of the lead roles in the ensemble movie. The movie was originally shown on June 26, 2009, at Edinburgh International Film Festival, and was shown in US theaters April 25, 2010. On February 22, 2009, Seyfried presented an award and performed at the 81st Academy Awards ceremony. In early March 2009, director Zack Snyder had tapped Seyfried to portray the lead character, Baby Doll, in Sucker Punch, but Seyfried had to drop out of the film due to scheduling conflicts with Big Love.

=== 2010s: Continued success ===
Seyfried starred alongside Channing Tatum in Dear John, the film adaptation of the novel of the same name that was written by Nicholas Sparks. The film, which was released February 5, 2010, received generally negative reviews. Seyfried wrote and recorded "Little House", a song on one of the soundtracks of Dear John. Kirk Honeycutt of The Hollywood Reporter wrote, "Seyfried gives the character and her relationship all she's got, but she can't do all the heavy lifting. The romance is too one-sided, and frankly, you can't blame her for steering her life into another channel." Despite the negative reviews, Dear John became the first film to break up Avatar's box office reign at number one at the United States box office, grossing $80 million in the U.S. theatrically and $115 million worldwide.

Seyfried next appeared as the title character in the erotic thriller Chloe, released by Sony Pictures Classics on March 26, 2010. Chloe premiered at the Toronto International Film Festival in September 2009. In the film, Seyfried's character is an escort who is hired to test a husband's faithfulness after his wife concludes that his fidelity could not be trusted. Chloe enjoyed commercial success and became director Atom Egoyan's highest-grossing film. Seyfried's performance in the film received favorable reviews from critics, helping her gain industry acclaim and additional opportunities to play varied roles.

Later in 2010, Seyfried starred in the romantic-comedy film Letters to Juliet, based on the book by Lise and Ceil Friedman. Letters to Juliet was released to mixed reviews but was a box office success, grossing $80 million worldwide. For her performance, Seyfried was awarded "Showest Breakthrough Female Star of The Year". She also won the "Scared-As-S**T" award for her performance in Jennifer's Body and was nominated for Best Female Performance for her movie Dear John, at the 2010 MTV Movie Awards. Also in 2010, Seyfried was named to Forbes' "17 Stars To Watch" list, and received three Teen Choice Award nominations, including for Choice Movie Actress Drama and Choice Movie Chemistry with her co-star Channing Tatum for roles in Dear John. Seyfried was also nominated for Choice Movie Actress Romantic Comedy for Letters to Juliet.

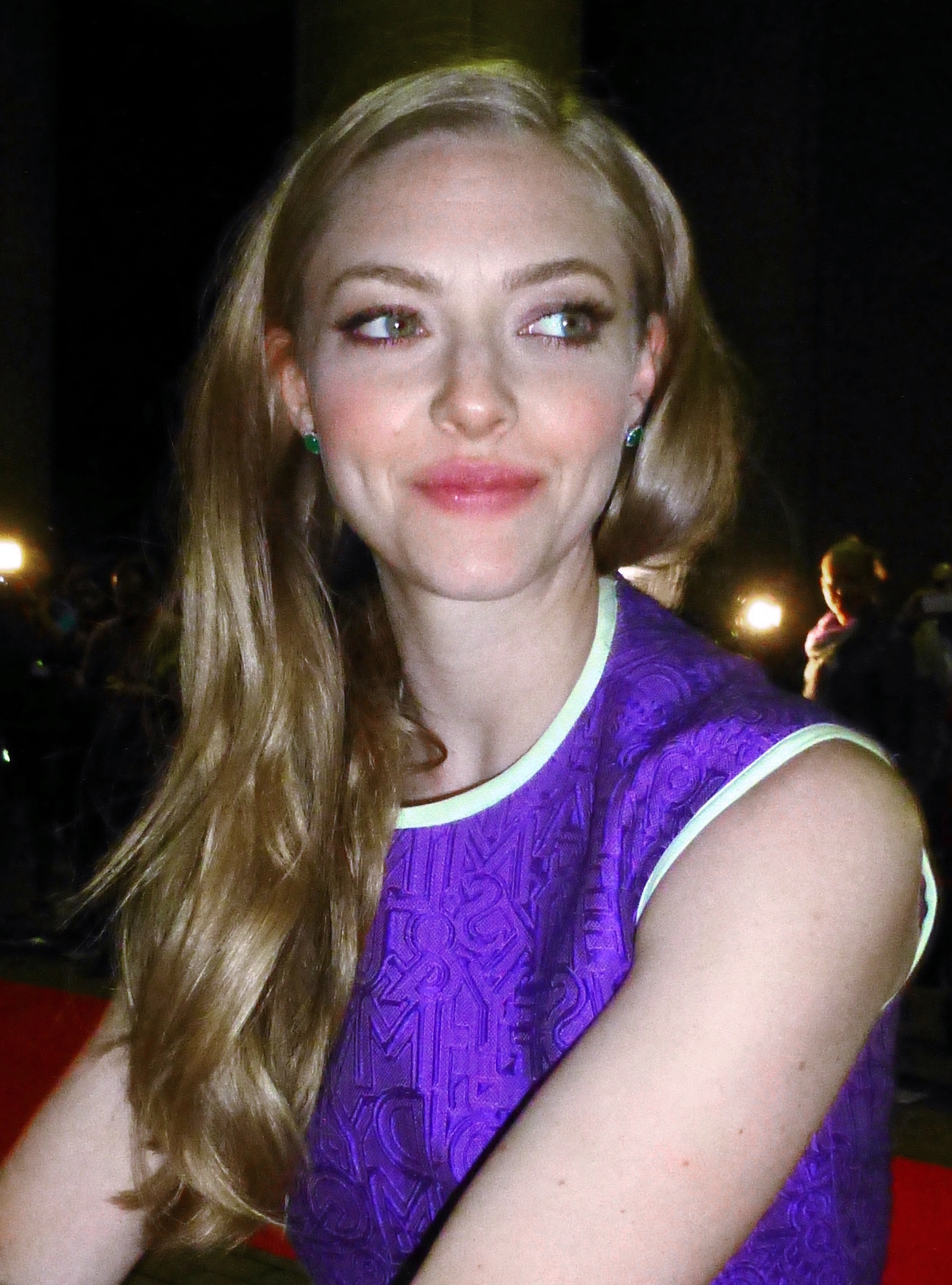
Seyfried at the Toronto International Film Festival in September 2014

In late January 2009, Seyfried was to appear in Myriad Pictures' adaptation of Oscar Wilde's comedy A Woman of No Importance. The film, which was scheduled for a 2011 release, encountered financing impediments. In 2009, she was set to star in the film Albert Nobbs but withdrew from the film because of scheduling conflicts; her role ended up being played by Mia Wasikowska. Seyfried next starred in Catherine Hardwicke's Red Riding Hood, playing the lead role of Valerie. The film was released on March 11, 2011, to mostly negative reviews, but earned $90 million worldwide on a $42 million budget. She also played the lead role of Sylvia Weis in Andrew Niccol's In Time, which reunited her with Alpha Dog co-star Justin Timberlake; In Time was released in October 2011 to mixed reviews but grossed in excess of $172 million worldwide. Also in 2011, Seyfried became a spokesperson and model for Clé de Peau Beauté, a line of Japanese beauty products.

Seyfried starred in the thriller Gone, released in early 2012. Later that year, she played Cosette in the film adaptation of the musical Les Misérables. The film, and her performance, received acclaim from critics, and was nominated for an Academy Award for Best Picture and grossed a total of $440 million worldwide.

In 2013, Seyfried had roles in the comedy The Big Wedding and in the animated movie Epic. She played Linda Lovelace in the biopic Lovelace, earning critical acclaim from film critics for her role in it. She appeared in the 2013 drama The End of Love. She was also signed to play the role of Ann Burden in the dramatization of the Robert O'Brien post-apocalyptic novel Z for Zachariah, but was replaced by Margot Robbie following a delay in the film's production. In 2013, she became the face of Givenchy.

In 2015, she appeared in the comedy Ted 2, alongside Mark Wahlberg and Seth MacFarlane, and played Peter Pan's mother in the film Pan. In 2018, she starred as Anon, a futuristic visual hacker, in the Netflix original film Anon, with Clive Owen; and reprised her role as Sophie Sheridan in the Mamma Mia! sequel, Mamma Mia! Here We Go Again, which was released in July. In 2019, Seyfried starred as Eve in The Art of Racing in the Rain, a comedy drama based on best selling book of the same name.

=== 2020s: Critical recognition ===
Seyfried in 2026

In 2020, Seyfried provided the voice of Daphne Blake in the film Scoob! She also starred opposite Kevin Bacon in the psychological horror You Should Have Left directed by David Koepp. She received critical acclaim for her third film of the year, playing actress Marion Davies in David Fincher's Mank (2020), which earned her Golden Globe and Academy Award nominations. She earned further critical acclaim in her performance as Theranos founder Elizabeth Holmes in the 2022 limited series The Dropout for which she won an Emmy Award for Outstanding Lead Actress and a nomination for a second Emmy for Outstanding Limited or Anthology Series as a producer of the show. In 2022 and 2024, she starred in the drama film Seven Veils and comedy horror film I Don't Understand You, respectively.

In early 2025, Seyfried was cast as Mickey Fitzpatrick in the drama miniseries Long Bright River, for which she received a second Golden Globe Award nomination in the category of Best Actress in a Limited or Anthology Series or Television Film. In December 2025, she played Nina Winchester in the film adaptation of The Housemaid, a performance that earned her critical acclaim. That same month, Seyfried received further acclaim for her portrayal of Ann Lee, the founder of the religious sect known as the Shakers, in the film The Testament of Ann Lee, for which she received nominations for the Golden Globe Award and the Critics' Choice Movie Award for Best Actress.

Seyfried played a prominent role in Lance Oppenheim and Nathan Fielder's 2026 documentary You Can See Everything on Elizabeth Holmes. Seyfried portrayed Holmes in reenactments of unrecorded interactions between Fielder and Holmes, briefly spoke with Holmes and questioned her partner Billy Evans with Fielder, and discussed the ethics of playing a fictionalized version of a real person in The Dropout.

== Public image ==
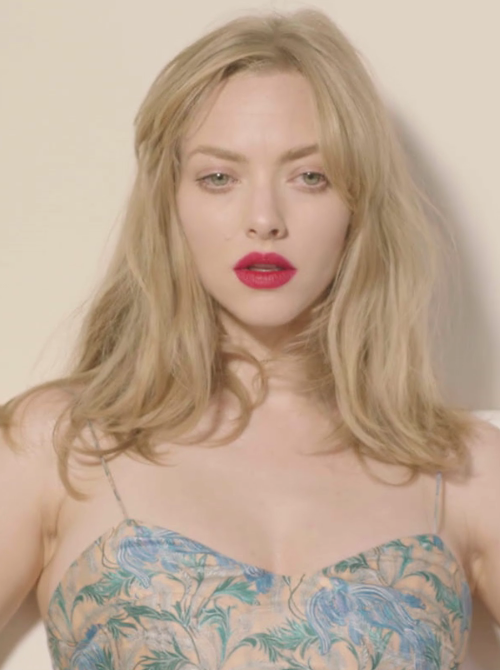
Seyfried photographed by Vogue in November 2016

Seyfried has received numerous accolades from People magazine, which ranked her number one in a 2011 article featuring "25 Beauties (and Hotties) at 25"; she was also included in the magazine's annual beauty list in 2009 and 2010. She also appeared in the magazine's "Beautiful at Every Age" article in 2012. She was featured in Vanity Fair's "Bright Young Hollywood" article in 2008; and in 2010 appeared on the magazine's cover along with several other actresses.

In 2010, Seyfried was selected as brand's muse, ambassador and official spokesperson for French-Japanese luxury skincare house Clé de Peau Beauté. In May 2013, she was selected as the global face of Givenchy's Very Irresistible Fragrance. In June 2016, Seyfried became the global face of the Miu Miu's Fall Winter 2016 Collection Campaign, alongside Taylor Hill, Anna Ewers, Mayowa Nicholas, Rose Hanbury and more.

Seyfried has been brand ambassador for Swiss luxury watch brand Jaeger-LeCoultre since 2019 and was named as the global ambassador for Lancôme in October 2019.

In 2025, Seyfried gained negative attention in the media after calling Charlie Kirk "hateful", following his assassination. She then had to hire bodyguards to protect her.

== Personal life ==
Seyfried has acknowledged having anxiety, obsessive–compulsive disorder, and panic attacks. She also had stage fright and, largely for that reason, avoided performing in theater productions until 2015.

Seyfried dated actor Dominic Cooper from 2008–2011, actor Desmond Harrington from 2012–2013, and actor Justin Long from 2013–2015. In 2016, she began a relationship with actor Thomas Sadoski, her co-star in the off-Broadway play The Way We Get By and the film The Last Word. They confirmed their engagement in September 2016, and married in March 2017. They have two children: a daughter born in 2017 and a son born in 2020. In September 2026, Seyfried and Sadoski announced their separation.

Seyfried lives on a working animal rescue farm, a nonprofit she runs with her family, located in the Catskill Mountains in upstate New York. She is a board member of the International Network for Aid, Relief and Assistance (INARA), which provides medical services for children wounded in war zones, with a special focus on refugee children from Syria affected by the Syrian civil war.

== Filmography ==
=== Film ===
Year	Title	Role	Notes	Ref.
2004	Mean Girls	Karen Smith		
2005	Nine Lives	Samantha		
2005	American Gun	Mouse		
2006	Alpha Dog	Julie Beckley		
2006	Gypsies, Tramps & Thieves	Chrissy	Short film	
2008	Solstice	Zoe		
2008	Mamma Mia!	Sophie Sheridan		
2008	Official Selection	Emily	Short film	
2009	Boogie Woogie	Paige Oppenheimer		
2009	Jennifer's Body	Anita "Needy" Lesnicki		
2009	Chloe	Chloe Sweeney		
2010	Dear John	Savannah Lynn Curtis		
2010	Letters to Juliet	Sophie Hall		
2011	Red Riding Hood	Valerie		
2011	A Bag of Hammers	Amanda Beekler		
2011	In Time	Sylvia Weis		
2012	Gone	Jillian "Jill" Conway		
2012	Les Misérables	Cosette / Euphrasie		
2013	The End of Love	Amanda	Cameo appearance	
2013	The Big Wedding	Missy O'Connor		
2013	Epic	Mary Katherine "M.K." Bomba	Voice role	
2013	Lovelace	Linda Lovelace	Also executive producer	
2014	A Million Ways to Die in the West	Louise		
2014	Dog Food	Eva	Short film	
2014	While We're Young	Darby Massey		
2015	Ted 2	Samantha Leslie Jackson		
2015	Unity	Narrator	Documentary film	
2015	Pan	Mary		
2015	Love the Coopers	Ruby		
2015	Fathers and Daughters	Katie Davis		
2017	The Last Word	Anne Sherman	Also executive producer	
2017	The Clapper	Judy		
2017	First Reformed	Mary Mensana		
2018	Gringo	Sunny		
2018	Anon	The Girl / Anon		
2018	Mamma Mia! Here We Go Again	Sophie Sheridan		
2018	Holy Moses	Mary	Short film	
2019	The Art of Racing in the Rain	Eve Swift		
2020	Scoob!	Daphne Blake	Voice role	
2020	You Should Have Left	Susanna Conroy		
2020	Mank	Marion Davies		
2021	Things Heard & Seen	Catherine Claire		
2021	A Mouthful of Air	Julie Davis	Also producer	
2022	Skin & Bone	Serene	Short film	
2023	Seven Veils	Jeanine		
2024	I Don't Understand You	Candice		
2025	The Testament of Ann Lee	Ann Lee		
2025	The Housemaid	Nina Winchester	Also executive producer	
2026	You Can See Everything	Herself / Elizabeth Holmes	Documentary film	
2026	The Life and Deaths of Wilson Shedd	Karen		
2026	Steps †	Cinderella	Voice role; post-production	
TBA	Octet †	Jessica	Post-production	
TBA	The Origin of the World †	TBA	Filming	

=== Television ===
Year	Title	Role	Notes	Ref.
1999–2001	As the World Turns	Lucinda "Lucy" Montgomery	Series regular	
2003	All My Children	Joni Stafford	3 episodes	
2004	Law & Order: Special Victims Unit	Tandi McCain	Episode: "Outcry"	
2004–2006	Veronica Mars	Lilly Kane	11 episodes	
2005	House	Pam	Episode: "Detox"	
2006	Wildfire	Rebecca	5 episodes	
2006	CSI: Crime Scene Investigation	Lacey Finn	Episode: "Rashomama"	
2006	Justice	Ann Diggs	Episode: "Pretty Woman"	
2006–2011	Big Love	Sarah Henrickson	44 episodes	
2008	American Dad!	Amy (voice)	Episode: "Escape from Pearl Bailey"	
2014	Cosmos: A Spacetime Odyssey	Marie Tharp (voice)	Episode "The Lost Worlds of Planet Earth"	
2017	Twin Peaks	Becky Burnett	4 episodes	
2018	Family Guy	Ellie (voice)	Episode: "Boy (Dog) Meets Girl (Dog)"	
2018	When You Wish Upon a Pickle: A Sesame Street Special	Natalie Neptune	Television special; cameo	
2022	The Dropout	Elizabeth Holmes	Lead role	
2023	The Crowded Room	Rya Goodwin	Main role	
2024	The Simpsons	Dr. Lori Spivak (voice)	Episode: "Frinkenstein's Monster"	
2025	Long Bright River	Mickey Fitzpatrick	Main role; also executive producer	
2026	Ted: The Animated Series †	Samantha Leslie Jackson (voice)	Main role	

== Discography ==
Discography
Year	Title	Certifications	Album
2008	"Honey, Honey"	BPI: Silver	Mamma Mia: The Movie Soundtrack
2008	"Gimme! Gimme! Gimme! (A Man After Midnight)"	BPI: Silver	Mamma Mia: The Movie Soundtrack
2008	"The Name of the Game"		Mamma Mia: The Movie Soundtrack
2008	"Slipping Through My Fingers"	BPI: Silver	Mamma Mia: The Movie Soundtrack
2008	"I Have a Dream"		Mamma Mia: The Movie Soundtrack
2008	"Thank You for the Music"		Mamma Mia: The Movie Soundtrack
2010	"Amanda's Love Song"		PostTheLove
2010	"Little House"		Dear John
2011	"Li'l Red Riding Hood"		Red Riding Hood
2012	"In My Life"		Les Misérables: Highlights from the Motion Picture Soundtrack
2012	"A Heart Full of Love"		Les Misérables: Highlights from the Motion Picture Soundtrack
2012	"One Day More"		Les Misérables: Highlights from the Motion Picture Soundtrack
2012	"A Heart Full of Love – Reprise"		Les Misérables: Highlights from the Motion Picture Soundtrack
2012	"Suddenly – Reprise"		Les Misérables: Highlights from the Motion Picture Soundtrack
2018	"One of Us"	BPI: Silver	Mamma Mia! Here We Go Again: The Movie Soundtrack
2018	"Knowing Me, Knowing You"		Mamma Mia! Here We Go Again: The Movie Soundtrack
2018	"Angel Eyes"	BPI: Silver	Mamma Mia! Here We Go Again: The Movie Soundtrack
2018	"Dancing Queen"		Mamma Mia! Here We Go Again: The Movie Soundtrack
2018	"I've Been Waiting for You"		Mamma Mia! Here We Go Again: The Movie Soundtrack
2018	"My Love, My Life"		Mamma Mia! Here We Go Again: The Movie Soundtrack
2018	"Super Trouper"		Mamma Mia! Here We Go Again: The Movie Soundtrack
2026	"Clothed by the Sun"		The Testament of Ann Lee (soundtrack)
2026	"Hunger & Thirst"		The Testament of Ann Lee (soundtrack)

== Awards and nominations ==
As a member of the ensemble cast of Les Misérables (2012), Seyfried earned a nomination for the Screen Actors Guild Award for Outstanding Performance by a Cast in a Motion Picture. Her portrayal of actress Marion Davies in the biopic Mank (2020) earned her nominations for the Academy Award, Critics' Choice Movie Award and Golden Globe Award for Best Supporting Actress.

Seyfried won the Primetime Emmy, Critics' Choice and Golden Globe Award and received a nomination for the Screen Actors Guild Award for Outstanding Actress in a Miniseries or Movie for portraying disgraced inventor Elizabeth Holmes in the Hulu biographical miniseries The Dropout (2022). As a producer of it, she earned additional Emmy, Critics' Choice, and Golden Globe nominations, winning the Critics' Choice.

Preceded by Adrienne Wilkinson	Voice of Daphne Blake; 2020 film Scoob!	Succeeded by Mckenna Grace (2020)
