= Glow & Behold =

Studio album by Yuck
- Released: 30 September 2013
- Genre: Indie rock, alternative rock, shoegaze
- Length: 43:30
- Language: English
- Label: Fat Possum
- Producer: Chris Coady

Yuck chronology
Yuck (2011)	Glow & Behold (2013)	Southern Skies (2014)

Singles from Glow & Behold
- 1. "Rebirth" Released: 2013; 2. "Middle Sea" Released: 2013; 3. "Lose My Breath" Released: 2013

Glow & Behold is the second album by the British rock band Yuck. It is the band's first album without former lead singer and guitarist Daniel Blumberg.

== Reception ==
Professional ratings
Aggregate scores
Source	Rating
Metacritic	63/100
Review scores
Source	Rating
Allmusic	2.5/5 stars
Pitchfork Media	6.1/10
NME	6/10 stars

The album received mixed reviews. Most reviewers saw the loss of the band's former frontman as pivotal, describing the band's new sound as smooth but lacking in passion. Mischa Pearlman of NME commented, "...this shift in direction sparkles with style and heart. Largely, though, the verve that made their debut exciting is, unfortunately, AWOL." There were positive comments about some tracks, such as "Middle Sea" and "Lose My Breath", which Ian Cohen of Pitchfork claimed, "boast the same kind of fuzzed-up leads that made the guitars of “Georgia” or “Get Away” as easy to sing along with as the vocals," but had "little of their frazzled energy", and accused singer Max Bloom and producer Chris Coady of trying to, "smooth out songs that lacked edge to begin with". Tim Sendra of Allmusic finished his review by saying, "All this record does is break the heart of anyone who fell in love with Yuck because of [their debut] album, and that's a real shame."

== Track listing ==
1. "Sunrise in Maple Shade"
2. "Out of Time"
3. "Lose My Breath"
4. "Memorial Fields"
5. "Middle Sea"
6. "Rebirth"
7. "Somewhere"
8. "Nothing New"
9. "How Does It Feel"
10. "Twilight in Maple Shade (Chinese Cymbals)"
11. "Glow & Behold"
