= List of awards and nominations received by Amanda Seyfried =

Amanda Seyfried awards and nominations
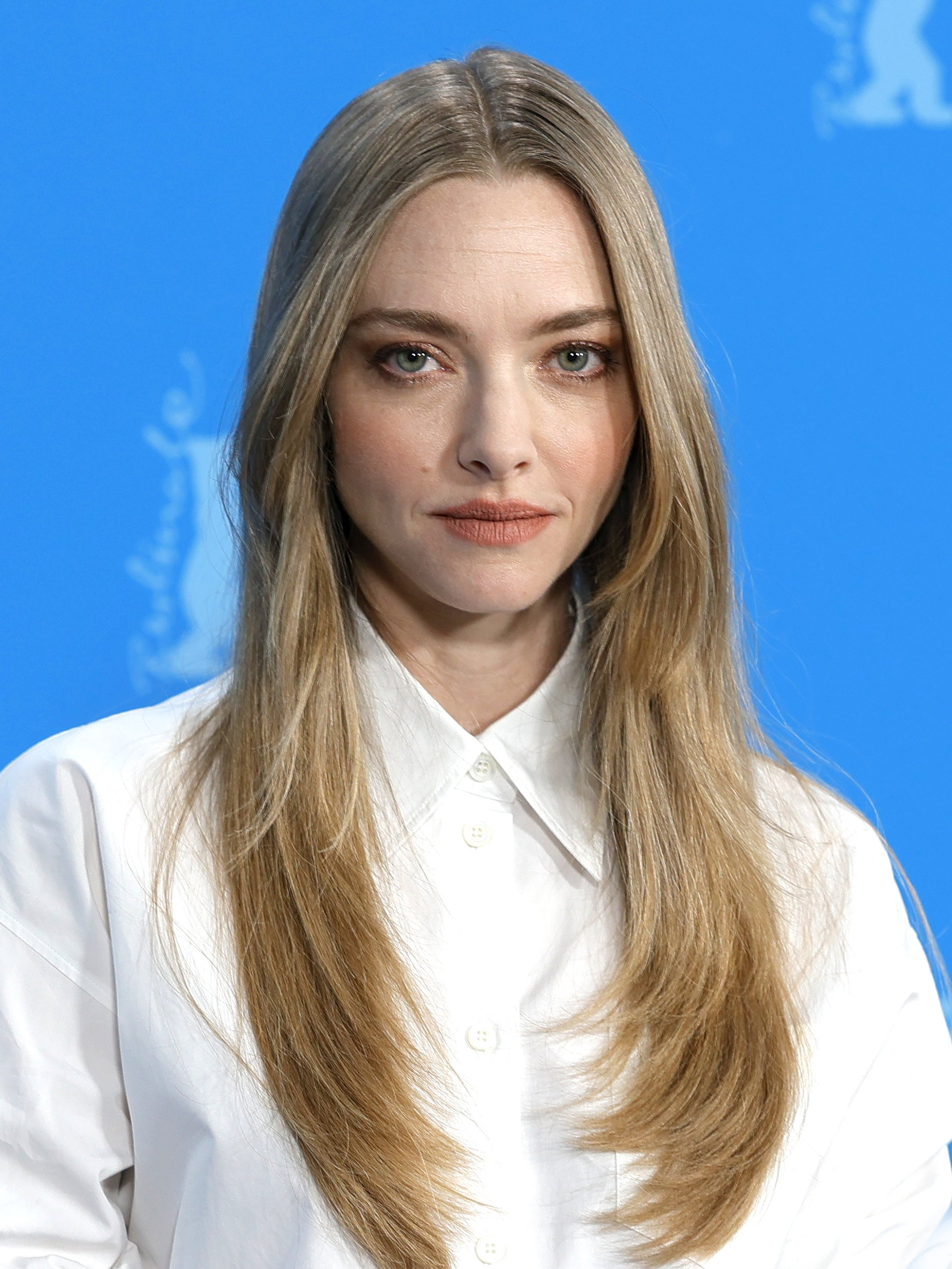
- Seyfried at the 2024 Berlinale
Awards and nominations
Award	Wins	Nominations
Academy Awards	0	1
Actor Awards	0	2
Critics' Choice Awards	2	5
Emmy Awards	1	2
Golden Globes	1	5
Producers Guild of America Awards	1	1

Totals (Note: Certain award groups do not simply award one winner. They acknowledge several different recipients, have runners-up, and have third place. Since this is a specific recognition and is different from losing an award, runner-up mentions are considered wins in this award tally. For simplification and to avoid errors, each award in this list has been presumed to have had a prior nomination.)
- Wins: 31
- Nominations: 87

Amanda Seyfried is an American actress who has received numerous accolades throughout her career, including a Primetime Emmy Award and a Golden Globe Award, as well as nominations for an Academy Award and two Actor Awards.

Seyfried came to prominence following her feature film debut in the teen comedy Mean Girls (2004), for which she received an MTV Movie & TV Award. She then appeared in the romantic comedy films Dear John and Letters to Juliet (both 2010), earning various nominations at the Teen Choice Awards, and the black comedy horror Jennifer's Body (2009), which won her a second MTV Movie & TV Award. She starred in the ABBA-inspired musicals Mamma Mia! (2008) and its sequel Mamma Mia! Here We Go Again (2018), for which she was nominated for two People's Choice Awards.

Seyfried is also known for her dramatic roles, including Cosette in the Tom Hooper-directed period musical Les Misérables (2012), for which she was nominated for the Actor Award for Outstanding Performance by a Cast in a Motion Picture. She received critical acclaim for her portrayal of Marion Davies in David Fincher's biopic Mank (2020), earning nominations for the Academy Award for Best Supporting Actress and the corresponding prizes at the Critics' Choice Movie Awards and Golden Globe Awards. Her portrayal of the titular character in the historic musical drama The Testament of Ann Lee (2025) earned her a nomination for the Golden Globe Award for Best Actress in a Motion Picture – Musical or Comedy.

On television, Seyfried continued to earn praise for her starring role as Elizabeth Holmes in the drama miniseries The Dropout (2022), for which she won the Primetime Emmy Award for Outstanding Lead Actress in a Limited or Anthology Series or Movie and the Golden Globe Award for Best Actress in a Limited or Anthology Series or Television Film. She received a second Golden Globe Award nomination in the same category for the Peacock detective miniseries Long Bright River (2025).

== Major associations ==
=== Academy Awards ===
Year	Category	Nominated work	Result	Ref.
2021	Best Supporting Actress	Mank	Nominated	

=== Actor Awards ===
Year	Category	Nominated work	Result	Ref.
2013	Outstanding Cast in a Motion Picture (Note: Shared with the cast)	Les Misérables	Nominated	
2023	Outstanding Actress in a Miniseries or Television Movie	The Dropout	Nominated	

=== Critics' Choice Awards ===
Year	Category	Nominated work	Result	Ref.
Critics' Choice Movie Awards
2013	Best Acting Ensemble	Les Misérables	Nominated	
2021	Best Supporting Actress	Mank	Nominated	
2026	Best Actress	The Testament of Ann Lee	Nominated	
Critics' Choice Television Awards
2023	Best Limited Series (Note: Shared with the producers of the series)	The Dropout	Won	
2023	Best Actress in a Movie/Miniseries	The Dropout	Won	

=== Emmy Awards ===
Year	Category	Nominated work	Result	Ref.
Primetime Emmy Awards
2022	Outstanding Limited or Anthology Series	The Dropout	Nominated	
2022	Outstanding Lead Actress in a Limited or Anthology Series or Movie	The Dropout	Won	

=== Golden Globes ===
Year	Category	Nominated work	Result	Ref.
2021	Best Supporting Actress – Motion Picture	Mank	Nominated	
2023	Best Limited or Anthology Series or Television Film (Note: The Best Television Awards for the Television Series – Musical or Comedy, Television Series – Drama, Limited Series and Motion Picture Made for Television categories are given to the individual producers accredited by the Producers Guild of America for those television programs.)	The Dropout	Nominated	
2023	Best Actress in a Limited or Anthology Series or Television Film	The Dropout	Won	
2026	Best Actress in a Motion Picture – Musical or Comedy	The Testament of Ann Lee	Nominated	
2026	Best Actress in a Limited or Anthology Series or Television Film	Long Bright River	Nominated	

=== Producers Guild of America Awards ===
Year	Category	Nominated work	Result	Ref.
2023	Outstanding Producer of Limited or Anthology Series Television	The Dropout	Won	

== Miscellaneous awards ==
Award	Year	Category	Nominated work	Result	Ref.
AACTA Awards	2021	Best International Supporting Actress	Mank	Nominated	
Capri Hollywood International Film Festival	2021	Best Supporting Actress	Mank	Won	
Dorian Awards	2021	Best Film Performance – Supporting Actress	Mank	Nominated	
Dorian Awards	2022	Best TV Performance	The Dropout	Nominated	
Dorian Awards	2026	Film Performance of the Year	The Testament of Ann Lee	Nominated	
Gracie Awards	2023	Best Leading Actress in a Limited Series or TV Movie	The Dropout	Won	
Golden Raspberry Awards	2016	Worst Supporting Actress	Love the Coopers and Pan	Nominated	
Golden Raspberry Awards	2019	Worst Actress	The Clapper	Nominated	
Gotham Awards	2005	Best Ensemble Performance	Nine Lives	Nominated	
Gotham Awards	2025	Outstanding Lead Performance	The Testament of Ann Lee	Nominated	
Huading Awards	2021	Best Supporting Actress	Mank	Won	
Locarno Festival Awards	2005	Best Actress (Note: Shared with Kathy Baker, Amy Brenneman, Elpidia Carrillo, Glenn Close, LisaGay Hamilton, Holly Hunter, Sissy Spacek, and Robin Wright)	Nine Lives	Won	
MTV Movie & TV Awards	2005	Best On-Screen Team (Note: Shared with Lacey Chabert, Lindsay Lohan, and Rachel McAdams)	Mean Girls	Won	
MTV Movie & TV Awards	2009	Best Breakthrough Performance – Female	Mamma Mia!	Nominated	
MTV Movie & TV Awards	2010	Best Female Performance	Dear John	Nominated	
MTV Movie & TV Awards	2010	Best Scared-As-Shit Performance	Jennifer's Body	Won	
MTV Movie & TV Awards	2022	Best Performance in a Show	The Dropout	Nominated	
National Board of Review	2013	Best Ensemble	Les Misérables	Won	
Palm Springs International Film Festival	2026	Desert Palm Achievement Award for Best Actress	The Testament of Ann Lee	Honored	
People's Choice Awards	2009	Favorite Cast	Mamma Mia!	Nominated	
People's Choice Awards	2018	Favorite Comedy Star	Mamma Mia! Here We Go Again	Nominated	
Santa Barbara International Film Festival	2021	Montecito Award	—	Honored	
Satellite Awards	2012	Best Cast – Motion Picture	Les Misérables	Won	
Satellite Awards	2021	Best Supporting Actress – Motion Picture	Mank	Won	
Satellite Awards	2026	Best Actress in a Miniseries or Motion Picture Made for Television	Long Bright River	Nominated	
Saturn Awards	2021	Best Supporting Actress in a Film	Mank	Nominated	
SCAD Savannah Film Festival	2025	Vanguard Award	The Testament of Ann Lee	Honored	
ShoWest Awards	2010	Breakthrough Female Star of the Year	—	Honored	
TCA Awards	2022	Individual Achievement in Drama	The Dropout	Nominated	
Teen Choice Awards	2010	Choice Movie Actress: Drama	Dear John	Nominated	
Teen Choice Awards	2010	Choice Movie: Chemistry (Note: Shared with Channing Tatum)	Dear John	Nominated	
Teen Choice Awards	2010	Choice Movie Actress: Romance	Letters to Juliet	Nominated	
Teen Choice Awards	2013	Choice Movie Actress: Romance	Les Misérables	Nominated	
Women's Image Network Awards	2025	Best Actress in a Feature Film	The Testament of Ann Lee	Won	

== Critics associations ==
Association	Year	Category	Nominated work	Result	Ref.
Alliance of Women Film Journalists	2012	Actress Most in Need of a New Agent	—	Nominated	
Alliance of Women Film Journalists	2021	Best Supporting Actress	Mank	Nominated	
Alliance of Women Film Journalists	2021	Most Egregious Lovers' Age Difference (Note: Shared with Charles Dance and Gary Oldman)	Mank	Nominated	
Astra Film Awards	2021	Best Supporting Actress	Mank	Nominated	
Astra Film Awards	2026	Best Actress in a Motion Picture – Comedy or Musical	The Testament of Ann Lee	Won	
Astra Film Awards	2026	Impact Award	—	Honored	
Astra TV Awards	2022	Best Actress in a Streaming Limited or Anthology Series or Movie	The Dropout	Won	
Astra TV Awards	2025	Best Actress in a Limited Series or TV Movie	Long Bright River	Nominated	
Austin Film Critics Association	2021	Best Supporting Actress	Mank	Nominated	
Austin Film Critics Association	2025	Best Actress	The Testament of Ann Lee	Nominated	
Boston Society of Film Critics	2020	Best Supporting Actress	Mank	Runner-up	
Chicago Film Critics Association	2020	Best Supporting Actress	Mank	Nominated	
Chicago Film Critics Association	2025	Best Actress	The Testament of Ann Lee	Nominated	
Dallas–Fort Worth Film Critics Association	2021	Best Supporting Actress	Mank	Won	
Georgia Film Critics Association	2021	Best Supporting Actress	Mank	Nominated	
Houston Film Critics Society	2021	Best Supporting Actress	Mank	Nominated	
IndieWire Critics Poll	2025	Best Performance	The Testament of Ann Lee	9th place	
Las Vegas Film Critics Society	2021	Best Supporting Actress	Mank	Won	
Las Vegas Film Critics Society	2026	Best Actress	The Testament of Ann Lee	Won	
London Film Critics' Circle	2021	Supporting Actress of the Year	Mank	Nominated	
Los Angeles Film Critics Association	2020	Best Supporting Actress	Mank	Runner-up	
National Society of Film Critics	2021	Best Supporting Actress	Mank	Runner-up	
New York Film Critics Online	2025	Best Actress	The Testament of Ann Lee	Nominated	
Online Film Critics Society	2021	Best Supporting Actress	Mank	Nominated	
Online Film Critics Society	2026	Best Actress	The Testament of Ann Lee	Nominated	
San Diego Film Critics Society	2012	Best Ensemble Performance	Les Misérables	Nominated	
San Diego Film Critics Society	2021	Best Supporting Actress	Mank	Runner-up	
San Francisco Bay Area Film Critics Circle	2021	Best Supporting Actress	Mank	Nominated	
Seattle Film Critics Society	2021	Best Actress in a Supporting Role	Mank	Nominated	
Seattle Film Critics Society	2025	Best Actress in a Leading Role	The Testament of Ann Lee	Nominated	
St. Louis Film Critics Association	2021	Best Supporting Actress	Mank	Nominated	
St. Louis Film Critics Association	2025	Best Actress	The Testament of Ann Lee	Nominated	
Vancouver Film Critics Circle	2021	Best Supporting Actress	Mank	Nominated	
Vancouver Film Critics Circle	2024	Best Actress in a Canadian Film	Seven Veils	Nominated	
Washington D.C. Area Film Critics Association	2012	Best Ensemble	Les Misérables	Won	
Washington D.C. Area Film Critics Association	2021	Best Supporting Actress	Mank	Nominated	
Women Film Critics Circle	2025	Best Actress	The Testament of Ann Lee	Runner-up	
