= Yuck (Yuck album) =

Studio album by Yuck
- Released: 15 February 2011
- Recorded: Summer 2010 (London)
- Genres: Indie rock, noise pop, shoegaze
- Length: 49:02
- Labels: Fat Possum, Mercury
- Producer: Yuck

Yuck chronology
Yuck (2011)	Glow & Behold (2013)

Singles from Yuck
- 1. "Rubber" Released: 2010; 2. "Georgia" Released: 2010; 3. "Holing Out" Released: 21 February 2011; 4. "Get Away" Released: 18 April 2011; 5. "The Wall" Released: 13 June 2011; 6. "Shook Down"/"Milkshake" Released: 2011

Yuck is the debut eponymous studio album by English indie rock band Yuck. The album was released on CD and digital download on 15 February 2011 on the Fat Possum Records label in the United States and on 21 February 2011 on the Mercury Records label in the United Kingdom.

== Background ==
Daniel Blumberg and Max Bloom left their previous group Cajun Dance Party in 2008. They formed Yuck in 2009 in London, England. The pair released two singles on vinyl only ("Rubber" and "Georgia") in early 2010 and recruited Jonny Rogoff on drums and Mariko Doi on bass (who had just recently left the group Levelload) shortly after. The group began recording its debut studio album in the summer of the same year in London in Max Bloom's parents' house.

Yuck released its debut single "Holing Out" on 20 February 2011. The Japanese edition of the album features a cover of "Natsu Nandesu" by Happy End, sung by bassist Mariko Doi.

== Critical reception ==
Professional ratings
Aggregate scores
Source	Rating
AnyDecentMusic?	7.3/10
Metacritic	81/100
Review scores
Source	Rating
AllMusic	4/5 stars
The A.V. Club	B
The Guardian	4/5 stars
The Independent	4/5 stars
Mojo	4/5 stars
MSN Music (Expert Witness)	A−
NME	8/10
Pitchfork	8.1/10
Q	4/5 stars
Rolling Stone	4/5 stars

Yuck received positive reviews from music critics. At Metacritic, which assigns a normalized rating out of 100 to reviews from mainstream critics, the album received an average score of 81, based on 35 reviews, indicating "universal acclaim". Tim Sendra of AllMusic called it "an impressively assured debut from such a young band" and wrote that the band's" love of shoegaze and loud/quiet '90s guitar rock is unadulterated and it translates into the songs and the sound, making it a pure and easy-to-love album for all those who have ever been fans themselves." Sam Majeske of Consequence of Sound described it as "a refreshingly diverse album consisting of a dozen songs as enthralling as those from any of the band’s influences." J. Edward Keyes of Rolling Stone's wrote, "Yuck channel their college-rock jones with skill and charm, balancing in-the-red guitar fuzz with melodic sweetness." Critics have also compared their sound to other bands such as My Bloody Valentine, Dinosaur Jr., Sonic Youth, and Pavement. Stereogum placed the album at number 13 on its list of the "Top 50 Albums of 2011", with Spin placing the album at number 31 on its list of the "50 Best Albums of 2011".

== Track listing ==
All songs written and composed by Daniel Blumberg & Max Bloom, except tracks 9 and 11 composed by Max Bloom.

No.	Title	Length
1.	"Get Away"	3:35
2.	"The Wall"	3:57
3.	"Shook Down"	3:27
4.	"Holing Out"	4:10
5.	"Suicide Policeman"	3:15
6.	"Georgia"	3:36
7.	"Suck"	4:19
8.	"Stutter"	3:42
9.	"Operation"	3:47
10.	"Sunday"	4:23
11.	"Rose Gives A Lilly"	4:06
12.	"Rubber"	7:14
Total length:		49:02

iTunes bonus tracks
No.	Title	Length
13.	"Dark Magnet"	5:02
14.	"Cousin Corona"	4:30

Bandcamp Deluxe Edition bonus tracks
No.	Title	Length
13.	"The Base of a Dream is Empty"	3:26
14.	"Milkshake"	4:05
15.	"Coconut Bible"	4:51
16.	"Cousin Corona"	4:30
17.	"Doctors in My Bed"	3:42
18.	"Soothe Me"	3:57

Japanese bonus track
No.	Title	Lyrics	Music	Length
15.	"Natsu Nandesu" (Happy End cover)	Takashi Matsumoto	Haruomi Hosono	3:14

== Personnel ==
Yuck

- Daniel Blumberg – vocals, guitar
- Max Bloom – lead guitar, vocals
- Mariko Doi – bass, lead vocals on "Natsu Nandesu"
- Jonny Rogoff – drums
- Ilana Blumberg – backing vocals

Technical and design personnel

- Yuck;– production
- Amir Amos;– drum production
- Marc Waterman;– drum engineering
- Nilesh Patel;– mastering
- Matt Pence & Max Bloom;– mixing
- Jou Bergman;– band photo
- Keith Anderson;– management
