= Andrea Janakas =

American film director

Andrea Janakas is an American writer and director from Boston, Massachusetts.

Andrea, also known as AJ, was the Executive Story Editor and writer on Season Three of Leverage: Redemption on Amazon Prime Video.

Andrea's previous projects have garnered acclaim from festivals and notable mentors such as Rodrigo Garcia, Gill Dennis and Graeme Clifford. A recipient of an American Film Institute scholarship, she was awarded a Fuji Filmmaker Award for her film, Gypsies, Tramps & Thieves. The film premiered at the Los Angeles Film Festival and stars Amanda Seyfried and Annie Quinn.

She also co-write the romantic comedy Holly's Holiday for Lifetime.

Her pilot Search For Life was the first to win the Grand Prize for a teleplay in the Slamdance Film Festival screenwriting competition in 2014.

== Sources ==
- https://www.imdb.com/name/nm0417308/?ref_=fn_all_nme_1
- http://www.salemnews.com/local/x520558204/Peabody-filmmaker-in-L-A-looks-forward-to-holiday-at-home salemnews.com
- https://tribecafilminstitute.org/filmmakers/detail/andrea_janakas tribecafilminstitute.org
- http://www.outfest.org/outfest-announces-2014-screenwriting-lab-fellows/ outfest.org
- https://www.moviebytes.com/contestDetail.cfm?tab=tab3&ContestNumber=58
