= The Brutalist (soundtrack) =

2024 soundtrack album by Daniel Blumberg

The Brutalist (Original Motion Picture Soundtrack)

Soundtrack album by Daniel Blumberg
- Released: December 13, 2024
- Genres: Orchestral; contemporary classical; film score
- Length: 81:39
- Label: Milan
- Producers: Daniel Blumberg; Peter Walsh

Daniel Blumberg film score chronology
The World to Come (Original Motion Picture Soundtrack) (2020)	The Brutalist (Original Motion Picture Soundtrack) (2024)

Brady Corbet film score chronology
Vox Lux (Original Motion Picture Soundtrack) (2018)	The Brutalist (Original Motion Picture Soundtrack) (2024)

The Brutalist (Original Motion Picture Soundtrack) is the soundtrack album composed by Daniel Blumberg for the 2024 film The Brutalist by Brady Corbet. It was digitally released by Milan Records on December 13, 2024.

== Production ==
Composer Daniel Blumberg had written over two hours of music for the film. He stated that his biggest challenge was finding the right instruments to evoke the time periods of the film. He used brass instruments like the trumpet to convey "very peculiar sounds related to the construction".

The soundtrack opens with an overture in three parts, as Blumberg and Corbet wanted the first 10 minutes of the film to have continual music. The opening sequence of the film was choreographed and filmed to Blumberg's demos of the overture.

== Release ==
The soundtrack was released digitally on December 13, 2024. Ahead of the soundtrack's release, the three overture tracks were released on November 22, 2024.

== Track listing ==
The Brutalist (Original Motion Picture Soundtrack) track listing
No.	Title	Length
1.	"Overture (Ship)"	4:49
2.	"Overture (László)"	3:01
3.	"Overture (Bus)"	2:12
4.	"Chair"	1:44
5.	"Van Buren's Estate"	0:53
6.	"Library"	3:26
7.	"Jazz Club"	3:38
8.	"Porn"	2:11
9.	"Monologue"	2:38
10.	"Up the Hill"	1:11
11.	"Pennsylvania"	1:01
12.	"Bicycle"	2:55
13.	"Steel"	2:12
14.	"Intermission" (featuring John Tilbury)	11:22
15.	"Erzsébet"	2:50
16.	"Handjob"	1:35
17.	"Bath"	1:02
18.	"Building Site"	4:31
19.	"Ribbon Cutting"	1:38
20.	"Picnic by the Lake"	1:52
21.	"Gordon's Dinner"	0:55
22.	"Looking at You"	1:00
23.	"Train Crash"	3:13
24.	"New York"	0:57
25.	"Stairs"	1:37
26.	"Carrara"	1:24
27.	"Marble"	2:08
28.	"Tunnel"	1:05
29.	"Construction"	2:50
30.	"Heroin"	3:33
31.	"Search Party"	3:21
32.	"Epilogue (Venice)"	2:55
Total length:		81:39

== Accolades ==
Professional ratings
Review scores
Source	Rating
AllMusic	4.5/5 stars
Pitchfork	7.8/10

The Brutalist (Original Motion Picture Soundtrack) awards and nominations
Award	Year (Note: Indicates the year of ceremony. Each year is linked to the article about the awards held that year, wherever possible.)	Category	Recipients	Result	Ref.
Academy Awards	2025	Best Original Score	Daniel Blumberg	Won	
Astra Creative Arts Awards	2024	Best Original Score	Daniel Blumberg	Nominated	
Boston Society of Film Critics Awards	2024	Best Original Score	Daniel Blumberg	Won	
British Academy Film Awards	2025	Best Original Score	Daniel Blumberg	Won	
Chicago Film Critics Association Awards	2024	Best Original Score	Daniel Blumberg	Nominated	
Critics' Choice Movie Awards	2025	Best Score	Daniel Blumberg	Nominated	
Golden Globe Awards	2025	Best Original Score	Daniel Blumberg	Nominated	
Indiana Film Journalists Association Awards	2024	Best Musical Score	Daniel Blumberg	Won	
Las Vegas Film Critics Society Awards	2024	Best Score	Daniel Blumberg	Nominated	
New York Film Critics Online Awards	2024	Best Use of Music	Daniel Blumberg	Nominated	
Phoenix Critics Circle	2024	Best Score	Daniel Blumberg	Won	
San Francisco Bay Area Film Critics Circle Awards	2024	Best Original Score	Daniel Blumberg	Won	
Satellite Awards	2025	Best Original Score	Daniel Blumberg	Nominated	
Seattle Film Critics Society Awards	2024	Best Original Score	Daniel Blumberg	Nominated	
St. Louis Film Critics Association Awards	2024	Best Music Score	Daniel Blumberg	Won	
Washington D.C. Area Film Critics Association Awards	2024	Best Score	Daniel Blumberg	Won	
World Soundtrack Awards	2025	Film Composer of the Year	Daniel Blumberg	Nominated	
World Soundtrack Awards	2025	Discovery of the Year	Daniel Blumberg	Won	

== Personnel ==
All music composed by Daniel Blumberg

- Daniel Blumberg – producer, recording engineer, piano, harmonica, keyboards, synthesizer
- Peter Walsh – producer, mixing engineer, recording engineer, percussion, brass
- Frank Arkwright – mastering engineer
- Sophie Agnel – piano
- John Tilbury – piano
- Tom Wheatley – double bass
- Joel Grip – double bass
- Elena Kakaliagou – French horn
- Pierre Borel – alto saxophone
- Seymour Wright – alto saxophone
- Evan Parker – soprano saxophone
- Axel Dörner – trumpet
- Carina Khorkhordina – trumpet
- Hilary Jeffery – trombone
- Simon Sieger – tuba, trombone, piano
- Robin Hayward – tuba
- James Dunn – percussion
- Michael Griener – percussion
- Steve Noble – percussion
- Antonin Gerbal – drums
- Vince Clarke – synthesizer, drum machine
- Adrien Brody – vocals (tracks 9, 24)

== Release history ==
Release history and formats for The Brutalist (Original Motion Picture Soundtrack)
Region	Date	Format(s)	Label(s)	Ref.
Various	December 13, 2024	Digital download; streaming	Milan	
