= The Colourful Life =

Studio album by Cajun Dance Party
- Released: April 28, 2008
- Recorded: 2007–2008
- Genre: Indie rock
- Length: 35:37; 42:34 (Japanese version)
- Label: XL
- Producer: Bernard Butler

Professional ratings
Review scores
Source	Rating
Allmusic	3.5/5 stars
The Guardian	4/5 stars
NME	6/10 stars
Drowned in Sound	5/10 stars

The Colourful Life is the only studio album by British indie rock band Cajun Dance Party, recorded whilst studying for their A-Levels.

The band released the song "The Hill, The View & The Lights" the only song on the album to feature Vicky Freund on vocals, as a free download from their website to promote the album.

The opening track was featured in an episode of the BBC Three sitcom Gavin and Stacey in the third series.

== Track listing ==
All tracks written by Daniel Blumberg and Robbie Stern, except where noted.

1. "Colourful Life" - 3:31
2. "The Race" - 3:59
3. "Time Falls" - 3:20
4. "The Next Untouchable" - 5:05
5. "No Joanna" - 3:19
6. "Amylase" - 3:42
7. "The Firework" - 3:36
8. "Buttercups" - 5:24
9. "The Hill, The View & The Lights" — (Blumberg, Stein, Freund) - 3:41
10. "Yesterday I Lost My Heart" (Japanese Bonus Track) - 3:22
11. "The Parachute" (Japanese Bonus Track) - 3:35

== Personnel ==
Cajun Dance Party

- Daniel Blumberg — vocals
- Robbie Stern — guitars, synthesizers, string arrangements
- Vicki Freund — keyboards, vocals
- Max Bloom — bass, percussion
- Will Vignoles — drums

Additional Personnel

- Sally Herbert — violin (tracks 1, 2, 5)
- Louisa Fuller — violin (tracks 1, 2, 5)
- Paul Thompson — violin (tracks 1, 2, 5)
- Hannah Bowers — violin (track 6)
- Sara Fattal — violin (track 6)
- David Britton — violin (track 6)
- Chris Worsey — cello (tracks 2, 3, 5)
