= Cajun Dance Party =

British band (2005–2010)

- Origin: London, England
- Genre: Indie rock
- Years active: 2005–2010
- Labels: WayOutWest; XL Recordings
- Spinoffs: Yuck
- Past members: Daniel Blumberg; Alex Meakin; Max Bloom; Robbie Stern; Vicky Freund; Will Vignoles

Cajun Dance Party were a five-piece band based in London, England. They originally consisted of Robbie Stern, Max Bloom, Daniel Blumberg, Will Vignoles, and Vicky Freund. Blumberg and Bloom left the band in 2009 to form the band Yuck, while other members of the band went to university. Freund now performs with the band TML. No split was ever officially announced.

== Biography ==
The band came into being when guitarist Robbie Stern invited Daniel Blumberg (vocals), Max Bloom (bass guitar), William Vignoles (drums) and Vicky Freund (keys) to start playing together, originally to participate in their school 'battle of the bands' in 2005 at University College School, in the same year as Bombay Bicycle Club. In their first few band practices, the 15-year-olds began working on their first four songs, "The Next Untouchable", "Colourful Life", "Amylase" and "Buttercups", which were recorded as demos and submitted to their Myspace site shortly after.

The band played their first few shows at the West London all ages club night 'Way Out West', performing in the bar beneath Brentford FC football stadium. Way Out West was well known for putting on many up and coming bands such as Jamie T, Late of the Pier, Video Nasties, The More Assured and Laura Marling. The organiser of the event, Keith Anderson, began to manage the band shortly after. Their first single, "The Next Untouchable", was released on Anderson's record label as a limited edition 7" single, with 500 copies being put into production.

Cajun Dance Party's debut album was entitled The Colourful Life, and released in April 2008. The band recorded the album sessions with Bernard Butler at the recording studio, West Heath Yard, owned by Edwyn Collins. West Heath Yard was also a music industry spoof which aired for a short while on Channel 4 in 1999, The album consisted of nine tracks, with singles from the album including "Colourful Life", "The Race", and "Amylase". The album was given 4/5 in The Guardian.

The band made many festival appearances in the UK and abroad, performing at such festivals as Reading and Leeds, Glastonbury, Oxegen, T in the Park, Underage Festival, Camden Crawl, the Summer Sonic Festival in Japan and the Les Inrocks tour in France.

Since the end of the band, Stern has become a barrister at Matrix Chambers, Vignoles works as a manager for the English Touring Orchestra, Freund remains involved in music production and sound engineering, and Blumberg is an artist and musician.

== Discography ==
=== Albums ===
- The Colourful Life (2008)

=== Singles ===
- "The Next Untouchable"
- "Amylase"
- "The Race"
- "Colourful Life"
