= Daniel Blumberg =

English musician and composer (born 1990)

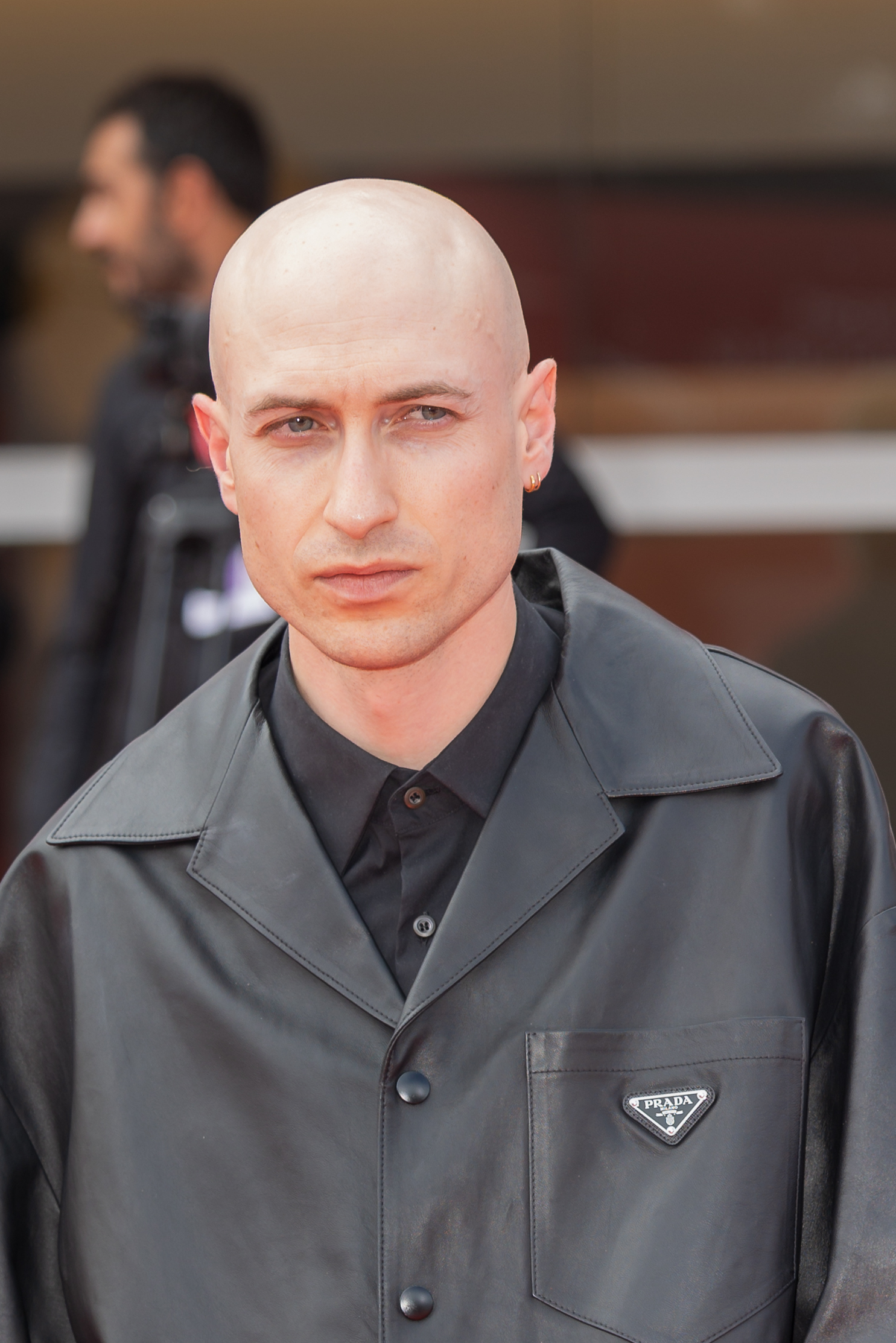
- Blumberg in 2025

Background information
- Also known as: Oupa, Hebronix
- Born: 1990 (age 35–36)
- Origin: London, England
- Genres: Experimental, indie rock, slowcore, electronic, film score
- Occupations: Visual artist, musician, composer, songwriter
- Instruments: Vocals, piano, keyboards, synthesizer, guitar, harmonica, clarinet
- Years active: 2005–present
- Labels: Mute Records, Fat Possum, XL, ATP, RecoOtoRoku, Boiled Egg
- Member of: GUO
- Formerly of: Yuck, Cajun Dance Party
- Website: boiledegg.org

Daniel Blumberg (born 1990) is an English artist, musician, songwriter and composer. He is known for his score for the 2024 film The Brutalist, for which he won the BAFTA Award for Best Original Music and the Academy Award for Best Original Score.

== Music career ==
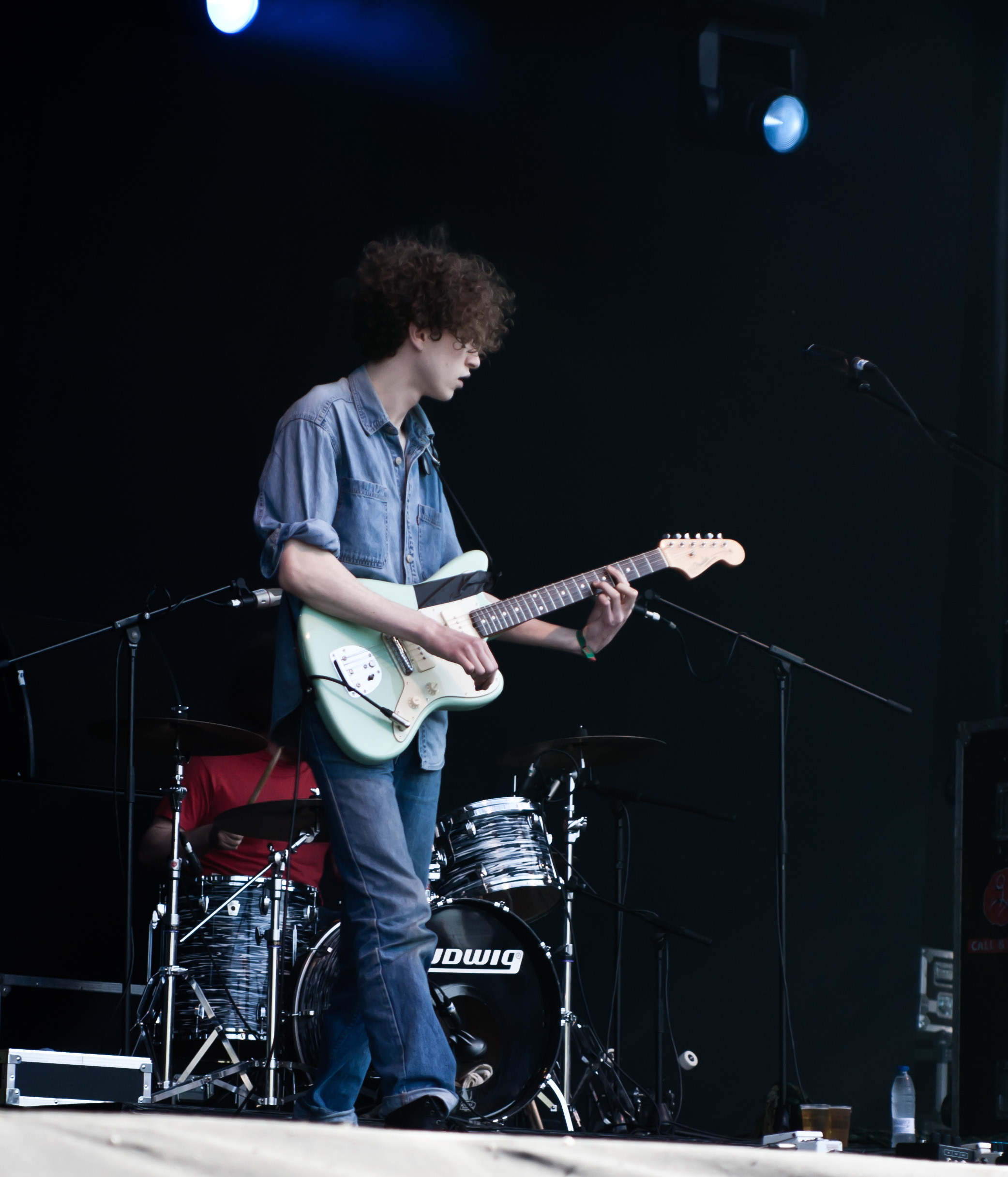
Blumberg with Yuck at Primavera Sound 2011

Blumberg was brought up in a Jewish family. In 2005, when he was only 15 years old, Blumberg co-founded and sang vocals for the band Cajun Dance Party, releasing their only album, The Colourful Life, in 2008. From 2009 to 2013, Blumberg was frontman and guitarist for the indie rock band Yuck, whose self-titled 2011 debut was released to positive reviews. During his time in Yuck, Blumberg also performed as Oupa, releasing the album, Forget, in 2011.

He left Yuck in 2013 to focus on other projects, the first of which was Unreal by Hebronix, a solo project by Blumberg produced by Neil Michael Hagerty, which was released by ATP Recordings in 2013. This was followed by a split single with Neil Michael Hagerty, released under the name Heb-Hex. Since 2013, Blumberg has worked mostly around Cafe Oto utilising Oto Project Space and working regularly with Seymour Wright, Billy Steiger, Tom Wheatley, Ute Kanngiesser, Ross Lambert and Elvin Brandhi.

He explained to Il Manifesto in a 2019 interview "Live music must be live. I can't say what will happen from one concert to another. Sound with different formations and combinations. Now I'm in a trio with Billy and Tom. The space and context are always different and for this reason the music we produce is never the same."

Mute Records released Blumberg's debut solo album, Minus, in May 2018. Minus was recorded by Scott Walker's producer Peter Walsh with a group of radical musicians whom Blumberg met at Cafe Oto including Billy Steiger (violin), Tom Wheatley (double bass), Ute Kanngiesser (cello) and Terry Day (vocals). Jim White played drums on the album. Minus received extremely positive reviews: The Times gave it 5 out of 5 and hailed it as a "modern classic", while Billboard described it as "one of the more unique and exquisite records you're likely to hear this year." Amongst other critical praise for the album, Rough Trade ranked it the sixth best album of 2018.

On 11 April 2018, Cafe Oto's OtoRoku released a live album, recorded on 28 February with Billy Steiger, Tom Wheatley and Ute Kanngiesser. It was mixed by Marta Salogni, amongst others.

On 5 June 2018, Blumberg, Steiger and Wheatley performed two tracks from Minus, "The Bomb" and "Minus", on Later... with Jools Holland.

Liv was released by Mute Records in December 2018. It was originally recorded live at Sarm Studios, London in 2014 and features Kohhei Matsuda on monosynth, Billy Steiger on violin and Tom Wheatley on double bass. Blumberg performed in various configurations across Europe in support of the album including Hamburg Elbphilharmonie alongside Arto Lindsay, plus international festivals including Katowice Ars Cameralis, The Hague Crossing Border, Milan Triennale and End of the Road Festival.

On 17 December 2019 he performed with a motorbike in a duo with Tom Wheatley for ICA's Pere Portabella retrospective.

In March 2020, he performed a live stream concert at Cafe Oto as part of a fundraiser for the venue which incorporated extended sections of live drawing as well as live versions of his songs. The concert was reviewed in a half-page piece written by Abi Bliss in The Wire the following month.

On&On, his second album on Mute Records was released on 31 July 2020. It featured the same core group of players as Minus, with the addition of Elvin Brandhi performing vocoded vocals on the track "Silence Breaker", and Peter Walsh returned to production duties. Initial reviews were overwhelmingly positive with Financial Times giving it 5 stars and describing it as 'a startlingly good album', The Independent called it 'an extraordinary work' in a 4-star review, and Uncut hailed it as "another superb LP" and gave it 8/10. Pitchfork scored it 7.6 and contended that "Blumberg uses improvisation and repetition to break free from traditional modes of songwriting".

His third studio album GUT was released 26 May 2023, once again via Mute Records. The album was preceded by one single, "CHEERUP", released on 5 April of the same year.

== Musical collaborations ==
Blumberg performs with saxophonist Seymour Wright as GUO. Their first release, GUO1, was self-released in 2016, with a text from David Toop. In 2017, GUO2 was released by Cafe Oto's label Oto Roku, and included text from American filmmaker and actor Brady Corbet.

GUO4 was released on Mute Records on 20 September 2019, featuring text from Fran Edgerley of Turner Prize-winning collective Assemble and a short film by Peter Strickland.

BAHK, Blumberg's ongoing collaboration with Elvin Brandhi (of the duo Yeah You) has encompassed sporadic concerts, residencies and collaborative music, drawing and film. The group released their first track on the Qu Junktions compilation Hope You're Well in May 2020. The pair also devised a video work and silverpoint drawings for Blumberg's series Silver Dinner which was broadcast via Homecooking in June 2020 in which Blumberg collaborated with Japanese musician Keiji Haino. In December 2021 BAHK premiered a 15 minute film work via AQNB called Alternatives for a Future Society beyond Head Infected Bodies.

== Film scores ==
In 2018, Curzon Cinemas/British Film Institute (BFI) commissioned Blumberg to compose the music to launch their Agnès Varda film season Gleaning Truths, which was announced in July 2018 and went on to tour the UK.

In 2019, GUO collaborated with British director Peter Strickland who created a short film entitled GUO4, to coincide with the release of the record on Mute which premiered at 76th Venice International Film Festival in August 2019. It debuted in the UK at the 63rd BFI London Film Festival in October 2019.

In October 2019, GUO collaborated with American film director Brady Corbet on a short film and performance entitled GYUTO which premiered at London's Close-Up Film Centre.

In July 2020, it was announced that Mona Fastvold's film The World to Come — starring Vanessa Kirby, Katherine Waterson, Casey Affleck and Christopher Abbott — would premiere in competition at the 77th Venice Film Festival, for which Blumberg composed the original score. Avant-garde musicians including Peter Brötzmann, Josephine Foster and Steve Noble feature on the score, which is produced by Peter Walsh. Following the premiere, The Observer described Blumberg's work as 'superbly original'. IndieWire voted it their Number 1 film score of 2021, writing that "in no film this year was a score more crucial to the flow and texture of a story... Blumberg's first movie score so beautifully crystallizes the ache of first love by listening for the stir of echoes that it leaves behind". Mute released the score on limited edition vinyl and CD on 14 January 2022, featuring two extended solo improvisations by Peter Brötzmann as physical edition exclusives. In May 2022, Blumberg won his first Ivor Novello Award for Best Original Film Score for The World To Come.

Blumberg composed the score to Brady Corbet's 2024 film The Brutalist, which stars Adrien Brody as the Hungarian Jewish architect László Tóth who survives the Holocaust and constructs a new life in America. The Hollywood Reporter dubbed it a "mighty score", which Vogue wrote "swerves elegantly from tinkling jazz horns and piano to bellowing, cinema-shaking blasts of brass and drums that evoke the tumult of Tóth's inner world". The score plays a particularly prominent role in the film, being described by the Financial Times as "imposing" and by Sight and Sound "muscular and boisterous". The film is dedicated to the memory of Scott Walker, who scored Corbet's previous films. The Hollywood Reporter wrote, "Blumberg's stirring work honors him [Walker] with subtle echoes, also evoking comparison at times with the jagged edges of Mica Levi or the solemn grandeur of Terence Blanchard.". His score has since also been seen as one of the best scores of 2024, receiving a variety of accolades, including a BAFTA Award as well as the Academy Award for Best Original Score.

In 2025, Blumberg produced the score for Mona Fastvold's musical film The Testament of Ann Lee and Gianfranco Rosi's Below the Clouds, the latter marked his first documentary score.

== Filmography ==
Year	Title	Director	Studio	Notes
2019	GUO4	Peter Strickland	Mindwax	Short film
2020	The World to Come	Mona Fastvold	Killer Films; Sea Change Media; M.Y.R.A. Entertainment; Yellow Bear Films; Hype Film; Ingenious Media; Bleecker Street	—N/a
2023	CHEERUP	Brady Corbet	—N/a	Music video for Daniel Blumberg's song CHEERUP
2024	The Brutalist	Brady Corbet	Brookstreet Pictures; Kaplan Morrison	Academy Award for Best Original Score; BAFTA Award for Best Original Music; Nominated—Golden Globe Award for Best Original Score
2025	Below the Clouds	Gianfranco Rosi	21Uno Film; Stemal Entertainment; Rai Cinema	—N/a
2025	The Testament of Ann Lee	Mona Fastvold	Kaplan Morrison; Intake Film; Proton Cinema; Mid March Media; Mizzel Media	Daniel Blumberg also played the small role of Deacon Talmadge Bishop

== Visual art ==
Blumberg is a visual artist working primarily in the medium of drawing. He creates figurative drawings with the ancient technique of silverpoint, also using watercolour and graphite. In 2015 he was awarded a scholarship to study a diploma in traditional drawing techniques at London's Royal Drawing School.

In 2019, he participated in the Hyper! Exhibition at Deichtorhallen, Hamburg, in which he showed a large-scale graphite drawing. Also on display were ten of his miniature watercolours and two video works. Hans Urlich Obrist wrote in the Hyper! exhibition catalogue that "Daniel Blumberg moves very delicately between the two worlds - between music and art."

He presented his first solo show UN-ERASE-ABLE in 2019 at Union Gallery in London displaying a selection of his silverpoint miniatures which he calls "micrograms".

In 2020 he continued his work with silverpoint in a short work made for JOMO, a series by the MACRO Museum of Contemporary Art in Rome and a series of drawings made for MK Gallery, Milton Keynes. He also exhibited in digital media at Homecooking for whom he created a series called SILVER DINNER combining drawing with music, performance and video in collaboration with Keiji Haino and Elvin Brandhi.

He composed the music for Marianna Simnett's video piece "Dance, Stanley Dance" which premiered at Matts Gallery, London in May 2020.

From 20 June 2020 to 10 January 2021, Blumberg exhibited a large graphite drawing at the Kunsthal in Rotterdam for the exhibition Black Album, White Cube alongside artists including Albert Oehlen, Scott King and Mark Leckey.

== See also ==
- List of Academy Award winners and nominees from Great Britain
