= List of Academy Award–winning foreign-language films =

The following is a list of foreign-language films that have won an Academy Award.

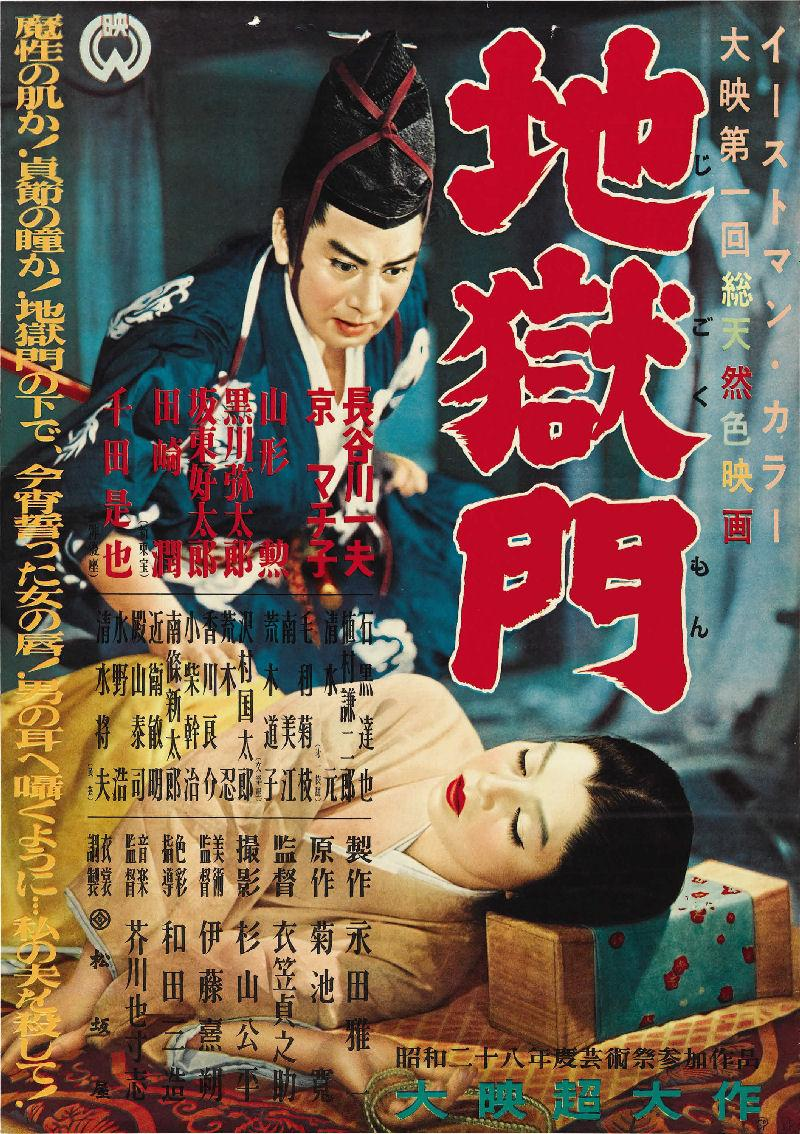
A theatrical poster for Japan's Gate of Hell, a recipient of the Academy Award for Best Costume Design as well as an Academy Honorary Award

== Criteria ==
The Academy of Motion Picture Arts and Sciences has given Academy Awards to foreign language films since 1945. The Academy defines a foreign language film as a feature-length motion picture produced outside the United States that contains primarily non-English dialogue. Films that meet these criteria are eligible for the Academy Award for Best International Feature Film. They can be nominated for awards in categories other than Best International Feature Film provided that they have been commercially released in Los Angeles County and comply with the special rules governing those categories. In addition, foreign-language films produced in the United States are not eligible for Best International Feature Film, but are eligible for awards in other categories.

== History ==
As of 2023, 27 foreign language films have won Academy Awards outside the Best International Feature Film category. The foreign language films with the most awards are Sweden's Fanny and Alexander, Taiwan's Crouching Tiger, Hidden Dragon, South Korea’s Parasite, and Germany’s All Quiet on the Western Front with four awards each, including the Academy Award for Best International Feature Film. Crouching Tiger, Hidden Dragon and Roma received ten Academy Award nominations including Best Picture, the highest number of nominations ever garnered for a foreign language film.

The Academy of Motion Picture Arts and Sciences has invited the film industries of various countries to submit their best film for the Academy Award for Best Foreign Language Film since 1956. The Foreign Language Film Award Committee oversees the process and reviews all the submitted films. Following this, they vote via secret ballot to determine the five nominees for the award. Before the competitive award was created in 1956, the Board of Governors of the Academy voted on a film every year that was considered the best foreign language film released in the United States, and there were no submissions. These films were recipients of Academy Honorary Awards.

== Other categories ==
Films that are eligible for the Best International Feature Film category are able to compete for other Academy Awards if they had been commercially released in Los Angeles County and fulfill the requirements of the categories they are participating in. Among the foreign language films that have won Academy Awards outside the Best Foreign Language Film category, six have won the Academy Award for Best International Feature Film while two, Shoeshine and Gate of Hell have received an Academy Honorary Award. Parasite is the only foreign film to win Best Picture so far although The Artist was the first silent film in French production to win Best Picture, but it was not submitted for the Academy Award for Best Foreign Language Film due to it being ineligible. Roma won the award because it was a co-production of United States and Mexico.

Year (Ceremony)	Film title used in nomination	Original title	Category	Winner(s)	Country	Language(s)
1945 (18th)	Marie-Louise		Writing (original screenplay)	Richard Schweizer	Switzerland	German
1954 (27th)	Gate of Hell^{[A]}	地獄門	Costume Design (color)	Sanzo Wada	Japan	Japanese
1956 (29th)	The Red Balloon	Le ballon rouge	Writing (original screenplay)	Albert Lamorisse	France	French
1959 (32nd)	Serengeti Shall Not Die	Serengeti darf nicht sterben	Documentary Feature	Bernhard Grzimek	Germany	German
1960 (33rd)	Never on Sunday	Poté tin Kyriakí(Ποτέ την Κυριακή)	Music (original song)	Manos Hadjidakis for "Never On Sunday"	Greece	Greece
1961 (34th)	La Dolce Vita		Costume Design (black-and-white)	Piero Gherardi	Italy	Italian, English, French, German
1962 (35th)	Divorce Italian Style	Divorzio all'italiana	Writing (story and screenplay)	Ennio De Concini; Alfredo Giannetti; Pietro Germi	Italy	Italian
1963 (36th)	8½^{[B]}		Costume Design (black-and-white)	Piero Gherardi	Italy	Italian, English, French, German
1966 (39th)	A Man and a Woman^{[B]}	Un homme et une femme	Writing (story and screenplay)	Claude Lelouch (story and screenplay); Pierre Uytterhoeven (screenplay)	France	French
1969 (42nd)	Z^{[B]}		Film Editing	Françoise Bonnot	Algeria	French
1973 (46th)	Cries and Whispers	Viskningar och rop	Cinematography	Sven Nykvist	Sweden	Swedish
1983 (56th)	Fanny and Alexander^{[B]}	Fanny och Alexander	Art Direction; Cinematography; Costume Design	Anna Asp (art direction); Sven Nykvist (cinematography); Marik Vos (costume design)	Sweden	Swedish, German, Yiddish, English
1985 (58th)	Ran	乱	Costume Design	Emi Wada	Japan	Japanese
1990 (63rd)	Cyrano de Bergerac		Costume Design	Franca Squarciapino	France	French
1995 (68th)	The Postman	Il postino	Music (original dramatic score)	Luis Enrique Bacalov	Italy	Italian, Spanish
1998 (71st)	Life Is Beautiful^{[B]}	La vita è bella	Actor in a Leading Role; Music (original dramatic score)	Roberto Benigni (best actor); Nicola Piovani (original dramatic score)	Italy	Italian, German, English
2000 (73rd)	Crouching Tiger, Hidden Dragon^{[B]}^{[E]}	臥虎藏龍	Art Direction; Cinematography; Music (original score)	Tim Yip (art direction); Peter Pau (cinematography); Tan Dun (original score)	Taiwan; China; Hong Kong; United States	Mandarin
2002 (75th)	Talk to Her	Hable con ella	Writing (original screenplay)	Pedro Almodóvar	Spain	Spanish
2004 (77th)	The Motorcycle Diaries^{[E]}	Diarios de motocicleta	Music (original song)	Jorge Drexler for "Al otro lado del río"	Brazil; Argentina; Chile; France; Germany; Peru; United Kingdom; United States	Quechua, Spanish
2006 (79th)	Letters from Iwo Jima^{[C]}^{[E]}		Sound Editing	Bub Asman; Alan Robert Murray	United States	Japanese, English
2006 (79th)	Pan's Labyrinth	El laberinto del fauno	Art Direction; Cinematography; Makeup	Eugenio Caballero (art direction); Pilar Revuelta (set decoration); Guillermo Navarro (cinematography); David Martí (makeup); Montse Ribé (makeup)	Mexico; Spain	Spanish
2007 (80th)	La Vie en Rose^{[E]}	La Môme	Actress in a Leading Role; Makeup	Marion Cotillard (actress); Jan Archibald (makeup); Didier Lavergne (makeup)	France; United Kingdom; Czech Republic	French
2011 (84th)	The Artist^{[D]}		Picture; Director; Actor in a Leading Role; Music; Costume Design	Thomas Langmann (producer); Michel Hazanavicius director); Jean Dujardin (actor); Ludovic Bource (composer); Mark Bridges (costume design)	France	Silent film
2018 (91st)	Roma^{[B]}^{[E]}		Director; Cinematography	Alfonso Cuarón (director, cinematography)	Mexico	Spanish, Mixtec
2019 (92nd)	Parasite^{[B]}	기생충	Picture; Director; Original Screenplay	Kwak Sin-ae (picture); Bong Joon-ho (picture, director, screenplay); Han Jin-won (screenplay)	South Korea	Korean
2022 (95th)	All Quiet on the Western Front^{[B]}	Im Westen nichts Neues	Cinematography; Music; Production Design	James Friend (cinematography); Christian M. Goldbeck (art direction); Ernestine Hipper (set decoration); Volker Bertelmann (music)	Germany	German, French
2022 (95th)	RRR		Music (original song)	M. M. Keeravani (music); Chandrabose (lyrics) for "Naatu Naatu"	India	Telugu
2023 (96th)	Godzilla Minus One	ゴジラ-1.0	Visual Effects	Takashi Yamazaki; Kiyoko Shibuya; Masaki Takahashi; Tatsuji Nojima	Japan	Japanese
2023 (96th)	The Zone of Interest^{[B]}		Sound	Tarn Willers; Johnnie Burn	United Kingdom	German
2023 (96th)	The Boy and the Heron	君たちはどう生きるか	Animated Feature	Hayao Miyazaki (director); Toshio Suzuki (producer)	Japan	Japanese
2023 (96th)	20 Days in Mariupol	20 днів у Маріуполі	Documentary Feature	Mstyslav Chernov (director and producer); Michelle Mizner (producer); Raney Aronson-Rath (producer)	Ukraine	Ukrainian, English, Russian
2023 (96th)	Anatomy of a Fall	Anatomie d'une chute	Original Screenplay	Arthur Harari; Justine Triet	France	French, English
2024 (97th)	Flow		Animated Feature	Gints Zilbalodis; Matīss Kaža; Ron Dyens; Gregory Zalcman	Latvia; France; Belgium	No dialogue
2024 (97th)	No Other Land		Documentary Feature	Basel Adra; Rachel Szor; Hamdan Ballal; Yuval Abraham	Palestine; Norway	Arabic, Hebrew, English
2024 (97th)	Emilia Pérez		Actress in a Supporting Role; Original Song	Zoe Saldaña (Supporting actress); Clément Ducol (Music); Camille (Music); Jacques Audiard (Music)	France	Spanish, English
2025 (98th)	Mr Nobody Against Putin		Documentary Feature	David Borenstein; Pavel Talankin; Helle Faber; Alžběta Karásková	Denmark; Czech Republic; Germany	Russian, English

== Notes ==
- ^{A} Received an Academy Honorary Award as the best foreign language film in 1954 at the 27th Academy Awards
- ^{B} Received an Academy Award for Best International Feature Film in addition to awards in other categories
- ^{C} Not eligible for the Academy Award for Best Foreign Language Film because it was a U.S. production.
- ^{D} Received an Academy Award for Best Picture, but it was not eligible or submitted for the Academy Award for Best Foreign Language Film.
- ^{E} Received an Academy Award, but it was a U.S. co-production.

== Academy Award-winning foreign language films using English dubbing ==
Year (Ceremony)	Film title used in nomination	Original title	Category	Winner(s)	Country	Language(s)
2002 (75th)	Spirited Away	千と千尋の神隠し	Animated Feature	Hayao Miyazaki	Japan	Japanese
2005 (78th)	March of the Penguins	La Marche de l'empereur	Documentary Feature	Luc Jacquet	France	French
2023 (96th)	The Boy and the Heron	君たちはどう生きるか	Animated Feature	Hayao Miyazaki	Japan	Japanese
