= ZagrebDox =

Film festival in Zagreb, Croatia

ZagrebDox International Documentary Film Festival
- ZagrebDox 2008 masthead
- Location: Zagreb, Croatia
- Founded: 2005
- Awards: Big Stamp (Veliki pečat); Little Stamp (Mali pečat)
- No. of films: 104 (2019)
- Language: International
- Website: www.zagrebdox.net

ZagrebDox is an international documentary film festival launched in 2005 which takes place in Croatia's capital Zagreb every year. The festival showcases creative documentary features from around the world, and also includes workshops for prospective filmmakers which help them develop their projects.

== History ==
The week-long festival, usually held in the spring, traditionally has an international and a regional competition category. The regional program includes films from Croatia, or from other countries in Southeast Europe (Albania, Austria, Bosnia and Herzegovina, Bulgaria, Hungary, Italy, Kosovo, Montenegro, North Macedonia, Romania, Slovenia, Serbia).

ZagrebDox also involves non-competitive screenings, such as retrospectives of works of particular filmmakers, or films dealing with a common subject or genre.

The festival is organized by a Zagreb-based film production company called Factum. As of 2019, the festival had featured more than 2,000 films over the previous 14 years, which were seen by approximately 290,000 moviegoers.

== Awards ==
The following are the main prizes given at the festival:

- Big Stamp (Croatian: Veliki pečat): The festival's main prize, given to both the best film screened in international competition, and to the best film in the regional competitive selection
- Small Stamp (Mali pečat) for the best documentary film made by a young filmmaker under 35 years of age
- FIPRESCI Award for best film in regional competition, as selected by a jury of professional film critics accredited by FIPRESCI
- Audience Award for the best film as voted by festival audiences

The festival occasionally includes special awards for their promotion of human rights or for highlighting topics deemed important and relevant, and also gives out lifetime achievement prizes to international filmmakers for outstanding accomplishments in the field of documentary filmmaking.

== Winners ==
=== International competition ===
Year	International title	Director(s)	Ref
2005 (1st)	The 3 Rooms of Melancholia	Pirjo Honkasalo	
2006 (2nd)	Before Flying Back to Earth	Arūnas Matelis	
2007 (3rd)	Civil Status	Alina Rudnitskaya	
2008 (4th)	War/Dance	Sean Fine and Andrea Nix Fine	
2009 (5th)	Lady Kul El Arab	Ebtisam Mara’ana	
2010 (6th)	Petition	Zhao Liang	
2011 (7th)	Position Among the Stars	Leonard Retel Helmrich	
2012 (8th)	Returns	Krzysztof Kadlubowski	
2013 (9th)	Kudzu Vine	Josh Gibson	
2014 (10th)	The Last Station	Cristian Soto and Catalina Vergara	
2015 (11th)	Virunga	Orlando von Einsiedel	
2016 (12th)	Poet on a Business Trip	Ju Anqi	
2017 (13th)	The Dazzling Light of Sunset	Salomé Jashi	
2018 (14th)	Of Fathers and Sons	Talal Derki	
2019 (15th)	Up the Mountain	Zhang Yang	
2020 (16th)	Froth	Ilya Povolotsky	
2021 (17th)	Downstream to Kinshasa	Dieudo Hamadi	
2022 (18th)	Sabaya	Hogir Hirori	
2023 (19th)	Manifesto	Angie Vinchito	
2024 (20th)	Four Daughters	Kaouther Ben Hania	
2025 (21st)	Mr. Nobody Against Putin	David Borenstein and Pavel Talankin	
2026 (22nd)	A Fox Under a Pink Moon	Mehrdad Oskouei and Soraya Akhlaghi	

=== Regional competition ===
Year	International title	Director(s)	Ref
2005 (1st)	Images from the Corner	Jasmila Žbanić	
2006 (2nd)	Totally Personal	Nedžad Begović	
2007 (3rd)	Europe Next Door	Želimir Žilnik	
2008 (4th)	Weddings and Diapers	Casey Cooper Johnson and Antoneta Kastrati	
2009 (5th)	The Caviar Connection	Dragan Nikolić	
2010 (6th)	Totó	Peter Schreiner	
2011 (7th)	Trials, Tribulations & Sustainable Growth of a Cock	Vladimir Perović	
2012 (8th)	A Day on the Drina	Ines Tanović	
2013 (9th)	Tzvetanka	Youlian Tabakov	
2014 (10th)	Sacro GRA	Gianfranco Rosi	
2015 (11th)	Cain's Children	Marcell Gerö	
2016 (12th)	4.7	Đuro Gavran	
2017 (13th)	Depth Two	Ognjen Glavonić	
2018 (14th)	The Other Side of Everything	Mila Turajlić	
2019 (15th)	Una primavera	Valentina Primavera	
2020 (16th)	Acasa, My Home	Radu Ciorniciuc	
2021 (17th)	My Uncle Tudor	Olga Lucovnicova	
2022 (18th)	Dida	Nikola Ilić and Corina Schwingruber Ilić	
2023 (19th)	Matter Out of Place	Nikolaus Geyrhalter	
2024 (20th)	KIX	Dávid Mikulán and Bálint Révész	
2025 (21st)	My Dad’s Lessons	Dalija Dozet	
2026 (22nd)	The Mountain Won't Move	Petra Seliškar	

=== Best Young Director ===
Year	English title	Original title	Director(s)	Country
2005	Life in Peace	Mirnaya zhizn	Antoine Cattin and Pavel Kostomarov	Switzerland, Russia
2006	The Angelmakers	—N/a	Astrid Bussink	Hungary, Netherlands, United Kingdom
2007	Grandmothers of Revolution	Babice revolucije	Petra Seliškar	Macedonia, Netherlands, Cuba, Slovenia
2008	Audience of One	—N/a	Michael Jacobs	United States
2009	On the Way to School	İki Dil Bir Bavul	Ozgür Dogan and Orhan Eskikoy	Turkey
2010	Chasm	Otchłań	Wojciech Kasperski	Poland
2011	Charcoal Burners	Smolarze	Piotr Zlotorowicz	Poland
2012	The Will	Testamentet	Christian Sønderby Jepsen	Denmark
2013	Turn Off the Lights	Lumea in patratele	Ivana Mladenović	Romania
2014	The Special Need	—N/a	Carlo Zoratti	Germany, Italy, France, Austria
2015	Another Hungary – The Life of a Village – Fragments	Másik Magyarország - Töredékek egy falu hétköznapjaiból	Dénes Nagy	Hungary
2016	Above and Below	—N/a	Nicolas Steiner	Switzerland, Germany, United States
2017	Depth Two	Dubina dva	Ognjen Glavonić	Serbia
2018	Over the Limit	—N/a	Marta Prus	Poland, Germany, Finland
2019	Still Recording	Lissa ammetsajjel	Saeed Al Batal, Ghiath Ayoub	France, Germany, Lebanon, Qatar, Syria

=== Audience Award ===
Year	English title	Original title	Director(s)	Country
2005	Direkt (40) Without Dad	Direkt (40) Bez tate	Nebojša Slijepčević	Croatia
2005	Children of the Decree	Das Experiment 770 - Gebären auf Befehl	Razvan Georgescu and Florin Iepan	Romania, Germany
2006	Wasn't awarded			
2007	Blue Blood	—N/a	Stevan Riley	United Kingdom
2008	All White in Barking	—N/a	Marc Isaacs	United Kingdom
2009	The English Surgeon	—N/a	Geoffrey Smith	United Kingdom
2010	People from the Milky Way	Ljudi s mliječnog puta	Miroslav Mikuljan	Croatia
2010	The Destiny of Line 13	Sudbina broja 13	Irena Škorić	Croatia
2011	Waste Land	—N/a	Lucy Walker	Brazil, United Kingdom
2012	Family Meals	Nije ti život pjesma Havaja	Dana Budisavljević	Croatia
2013	Gangster of Love	Gangster te voli	Nebojša Slijepčević	Croatia, Germany, Romania
2014	Dear Lastan!	Dragi Lastane!	Irena Škorić	Croatia
2015	I Like That Super Most Best	Lijepo mi je s tobom, znaš	Eva Kraljević	Croatia
2016	Twilight of a Life	Ad ktze ha'zrikha	Sylvain Biegeleisen	Belgium, Israel
2017	The Eagle Huntress	—N/a	Otto Bell	United Kingdom, Mongolia, United States
2018	The Other Side of Everything	Druga strana svega	Mila Turajlić	Serbia, France, Qatar
2019	Neighbors	Susjedi	Tomislav Žaja	Croatia

=== Lifetime Achievement Award ===
(The Lifetime Achievement Award (Počasni pečat) was introduced at the 2009 edition, for outstanding contribution to documentary filmmaking)

- (Croatia) Bogdan Žižić (2009)
- (United States) Jon Alpert (2009)

== Special awards ==
Apart from the regular categories, the festival sometimes awards special prizes, often related to themes of a particular festival edition.

Year	Award	Film	Director
2006	Best film in the Sports and Music theme program	The Human Hambone	(United States) Mark Morgan
2008	International Critics' Jury Award	The Devil Came on Horseback & Audience of One	(United States) Ricki Stern & (United States) Anne Sundberg (United States) Michael Jacobs
2008	Amnesty International Award	All White in Barking	(United Kingdom) Marc Isaacs
2009	Movies That Matter Award	Burma VJ: Reporting from a Closed Country (Burma VJ: Reporter i et lukket land)	(Denmark) Anders Østergaard
2012	Movies That Matter Award	The Tinniest Place	(Mexico) Tatiana Huezo
2013	Movies That Matter Award	The Act of Killing	(Denmark) Joshua Oppenheimer
2014	Movies That Matter Award	Pipeline (Truba)	(Russia) Vitaly Mansky
2015	Movies That Matter Award	Rich Hill	(United States) Andrew Droz Palermo & (United States) Tracy Droz Tragos
