= 79th British Academy Film Awards =

2026 edition of ceremony

- Date: 22 February 2026
- Site: Royal Festival Hall, London
- Hosted by: Alan Cumming

Highlights
- Best Film: One Battle After Another
- Best British Film: Hamnet
- Best Actor: Robert Aramayo; I Swear
- Best Actress: Jessie Buckley; Hamnet
- Most awards: One Battle After Another (6)
- Most nominations: One Battle After Another (14)

The 79th British Academy Film Awards, more commonly known as the BAFTAs, were held on 22 February 2026, honouring the best national and foreign films of 2025, at the Royal Festival Hall within London's Southbank Centre. Presented by the British Academy of Film and Television Arts, accolades were given for the best feature-length films and documentaries of any nationality that were screened at British cinemas in 2025.

The ceremony was hosted by Alan Cumming for the first time, following David Tennant's hosting position in 2024 and 2025. The broadcast aired on BBC One and streamed on iPlayer in the United Kingdom at 7 p.m. GMT; in the United States, the E! network aired the ceremony for the first time as a pre-recorded special at 8 p.m. ET/PT, after previously being streamed via BritBox in America.

The BAFTA longlists were announced on 9 January 2026. The nominations were announced by 2025 EE Rising Star Award winner David Jonsson and Aimee Lou Wood on 27 January 2026 from BAFTA's HQ at 195 Piccadilly, London, and live-streamed on BAFTA's X account and YouTube channel. The EE Rising Star Award nominees, which is the only category voted for by the British public, were announced on 14 January 2026.

The action thriller film One Battle After Another led the longlists with sixteen mentions, becoming the most longlisted film in BAFTA history, followed by Hamnet and Sinners with fourteen each. (Note: One Battle After Another's sixteen mentions surpasses the previous record of fifteen by 2024's Emilia Pérez, as well as 2023's Barbie, Killers of the Flower Moon and Oppenheimer, and 2022's All Quiet on the Western Front.) One Battle After Another ultimately received the most nominations with fourteen, followed by Sinners with thirteen, and Hamnet and Marty Supreme with eleven each. Hamnet also made history as BAFTA's most-nominated film by a female director, while Sinners became the most-nominated film by a Black director in BAFTA history.

Ultimately, One Battle After Another won the most awards with six, followed by Frankenstein and Sinners with three each. Sinners made history as BAFTA's most-honored film by a Black director, while Marty Supreme tied the record for the most losses at a single ceremony, winning none of its eleven nominations.

This ceremony is particularly notable for the moment when John Davidson, Scottish campaigner for Tourette syndrome (who has coprolalia), shouted out the word "nigger" while Black actors Michael B. Jordan and Delroy Lindo were presenting on stage, causing major controversy and intense media coverage, with specific backlash targeted at Davidson and a majority towards the BBC for broadcasting and not editing out the word. (Note: Attributed to multiple references:)

== Winners and nominees ==
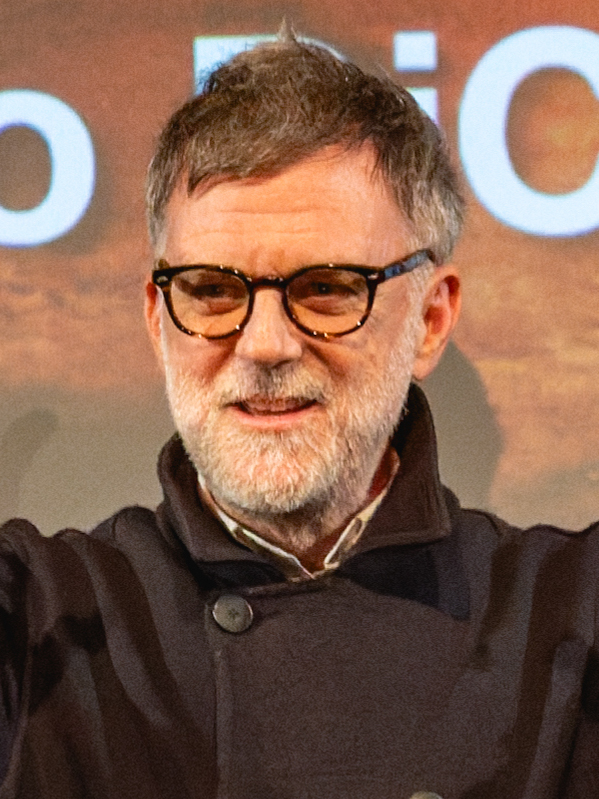
Paul Thomas Anderson, Best Film co-winner, and Best Director and Best Adapted Screenplay winner

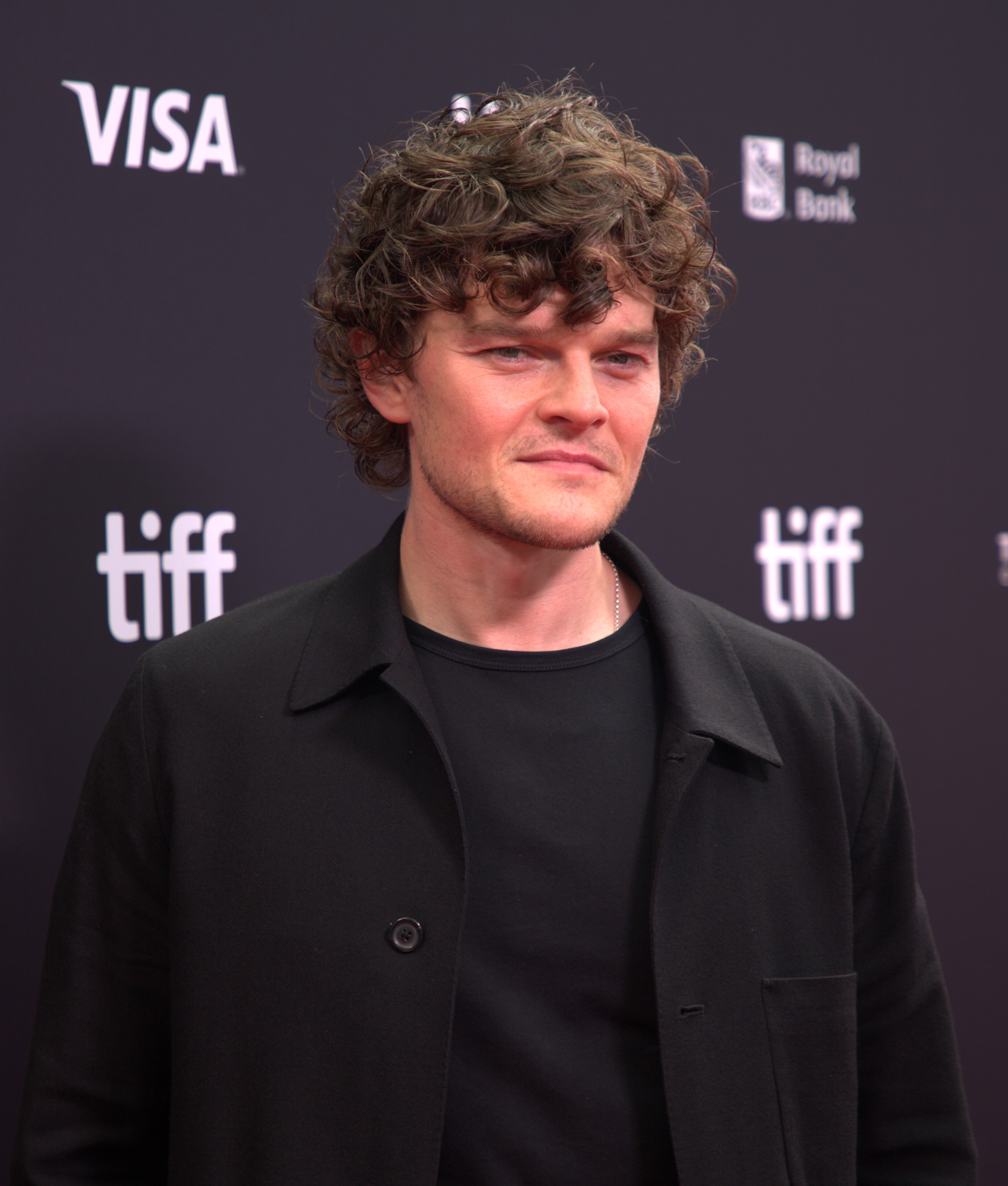
Robert Aramayo, Best Actor and EE Rising Star Award winner

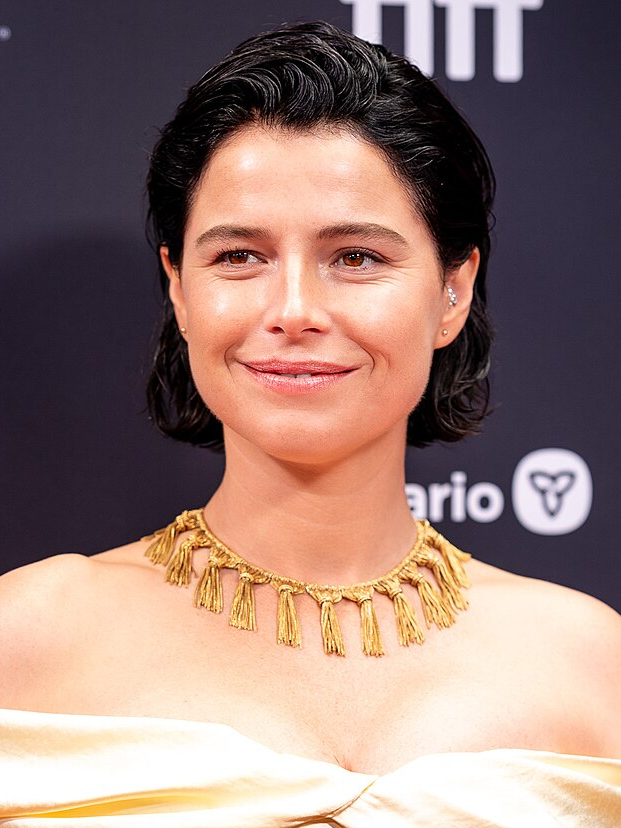
Jessie Buckley, Best Actress winner

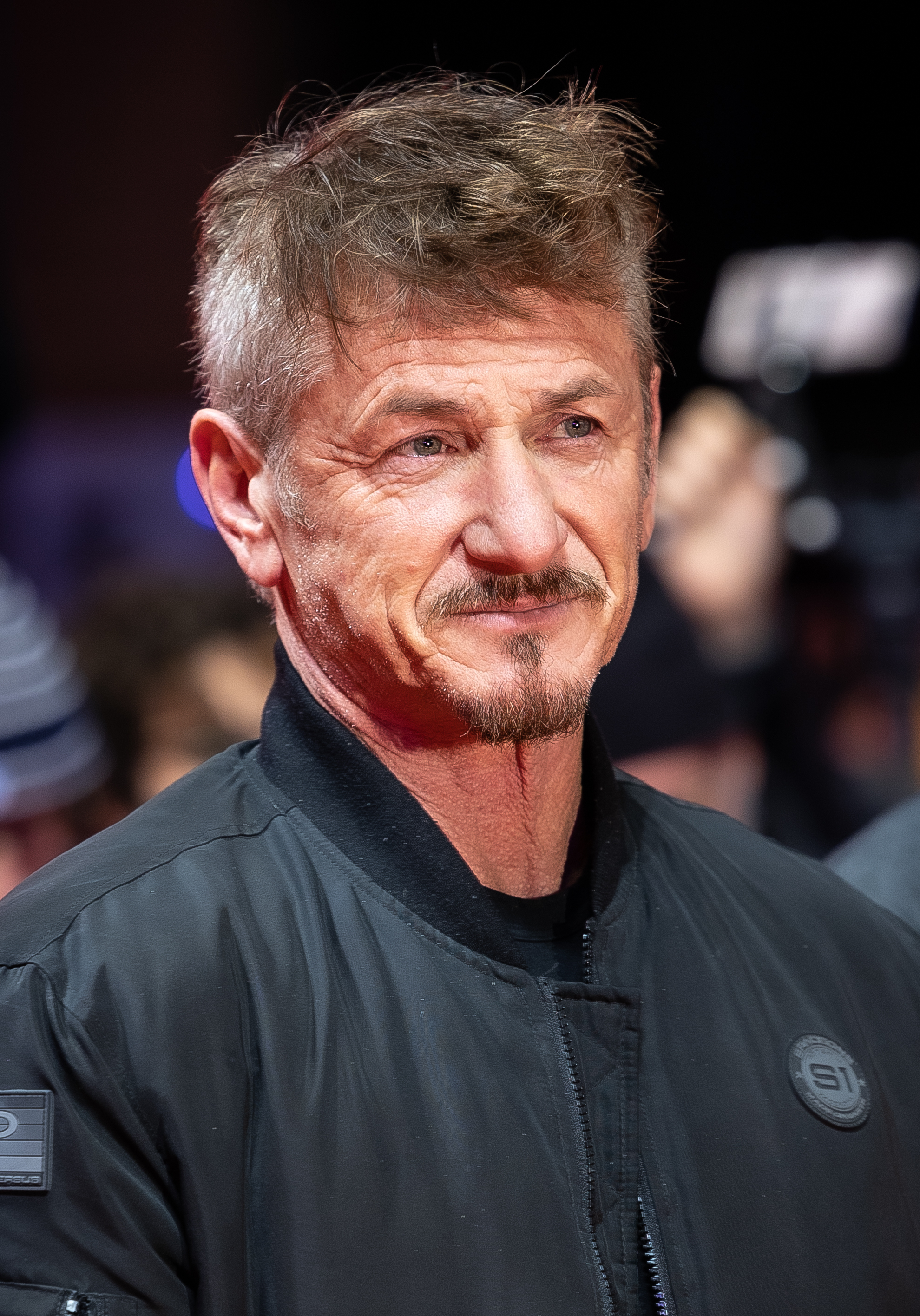
Sean Penn, Best Supporting Actor winner

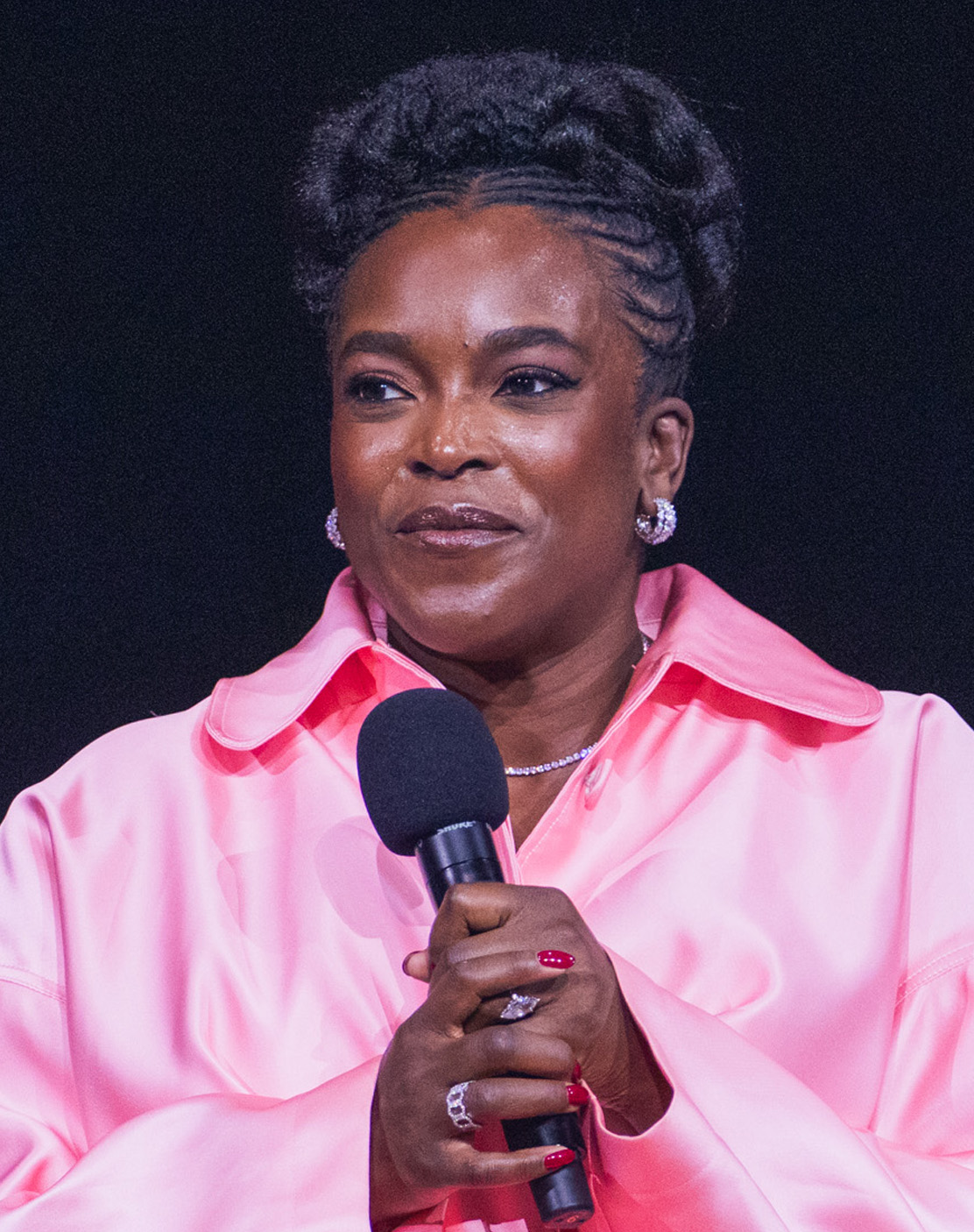
Wunmi Mosaku, Best Supporting Actress winner

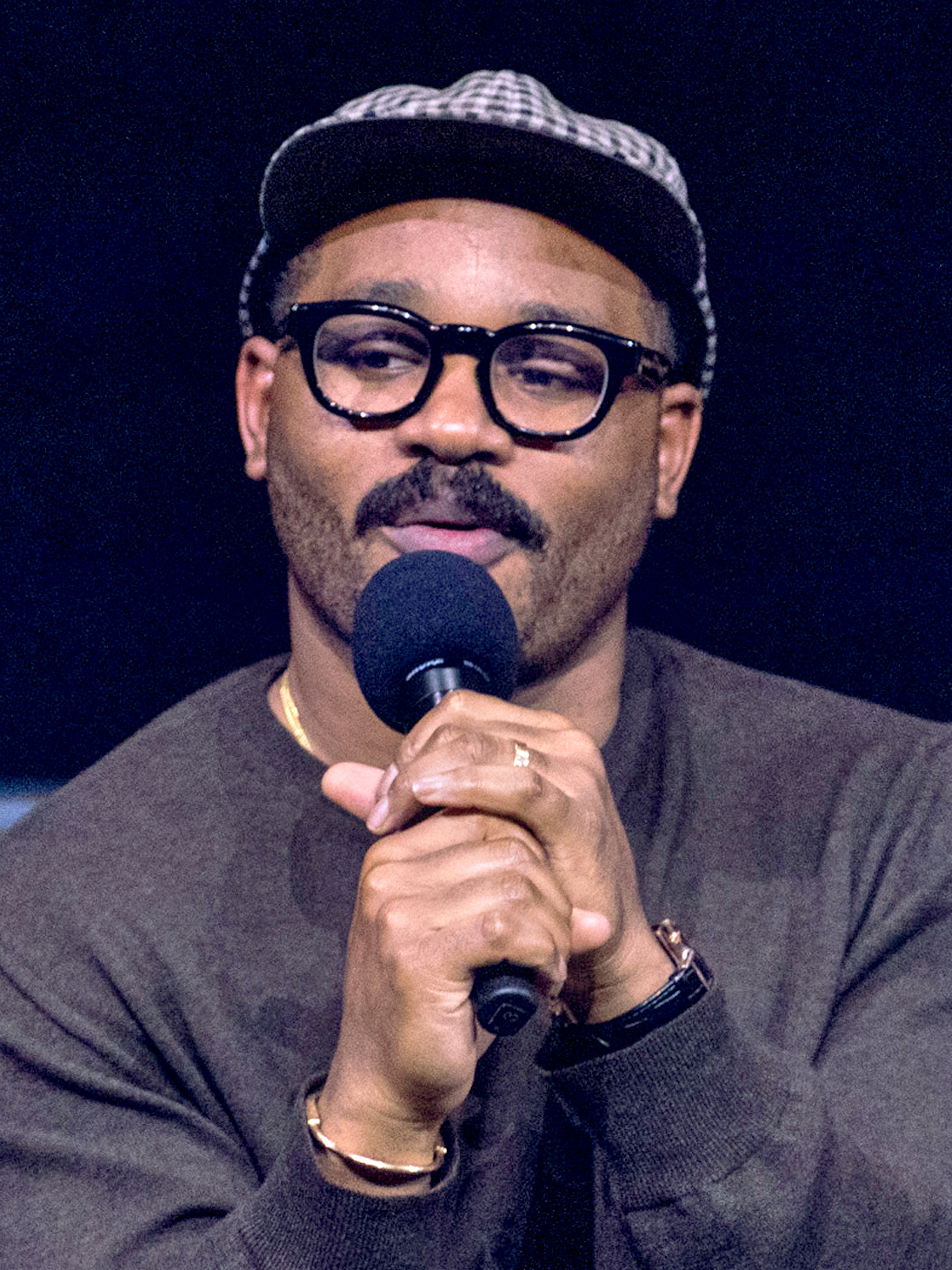
Ryan Coogler, Best Original Screenplay winner

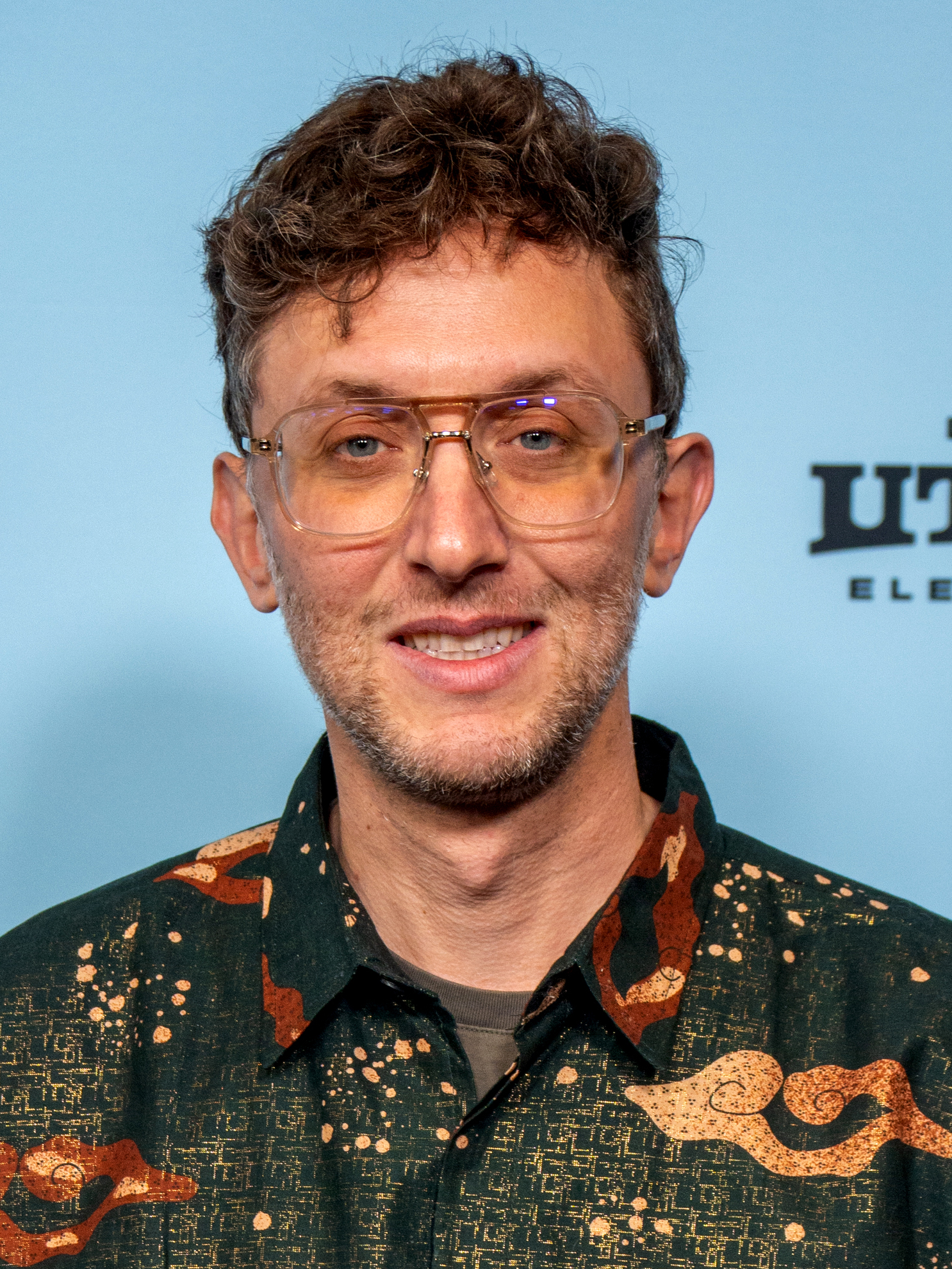
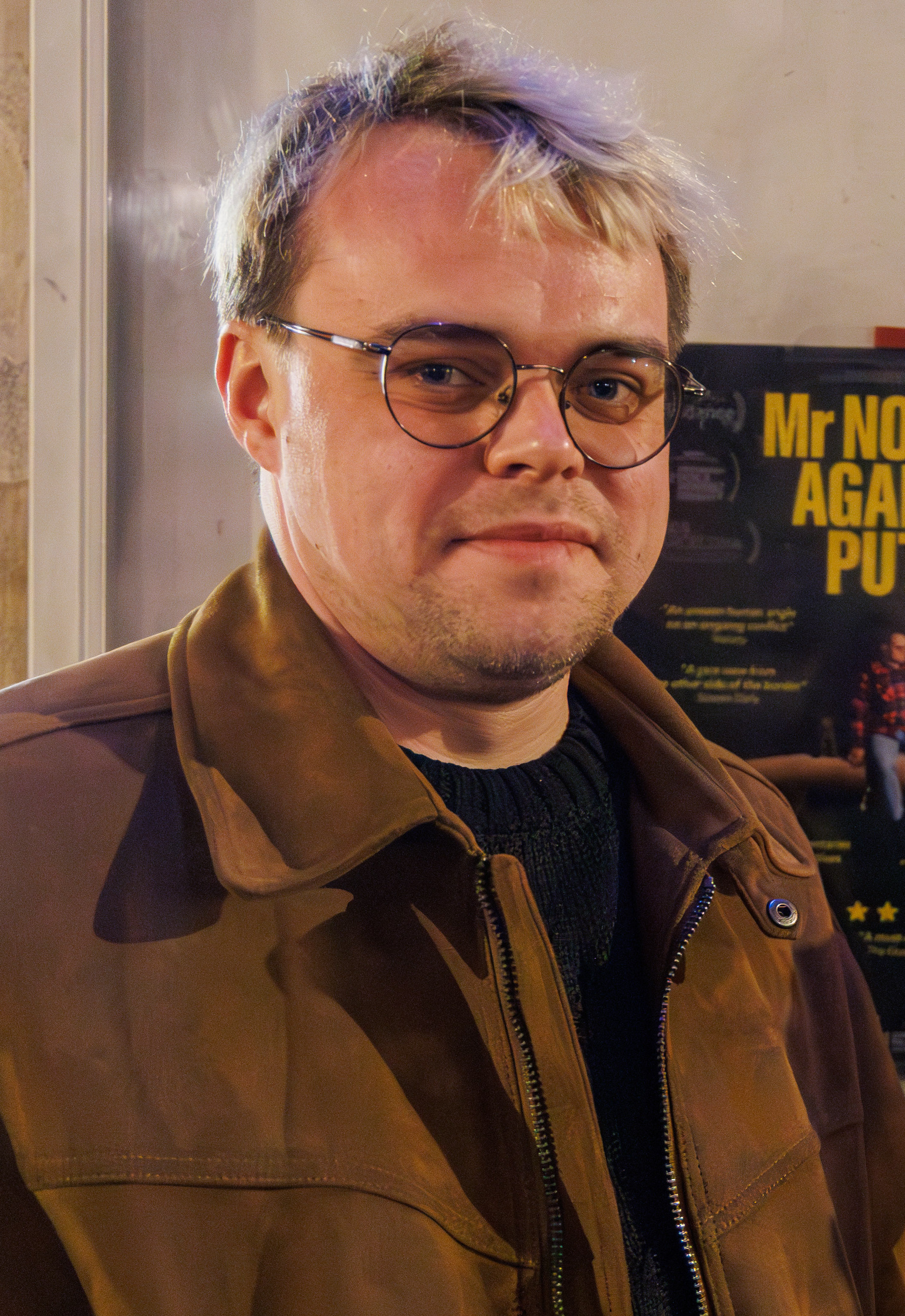
David Borenstein and Pavel Talankin, Best Documentary co-winners

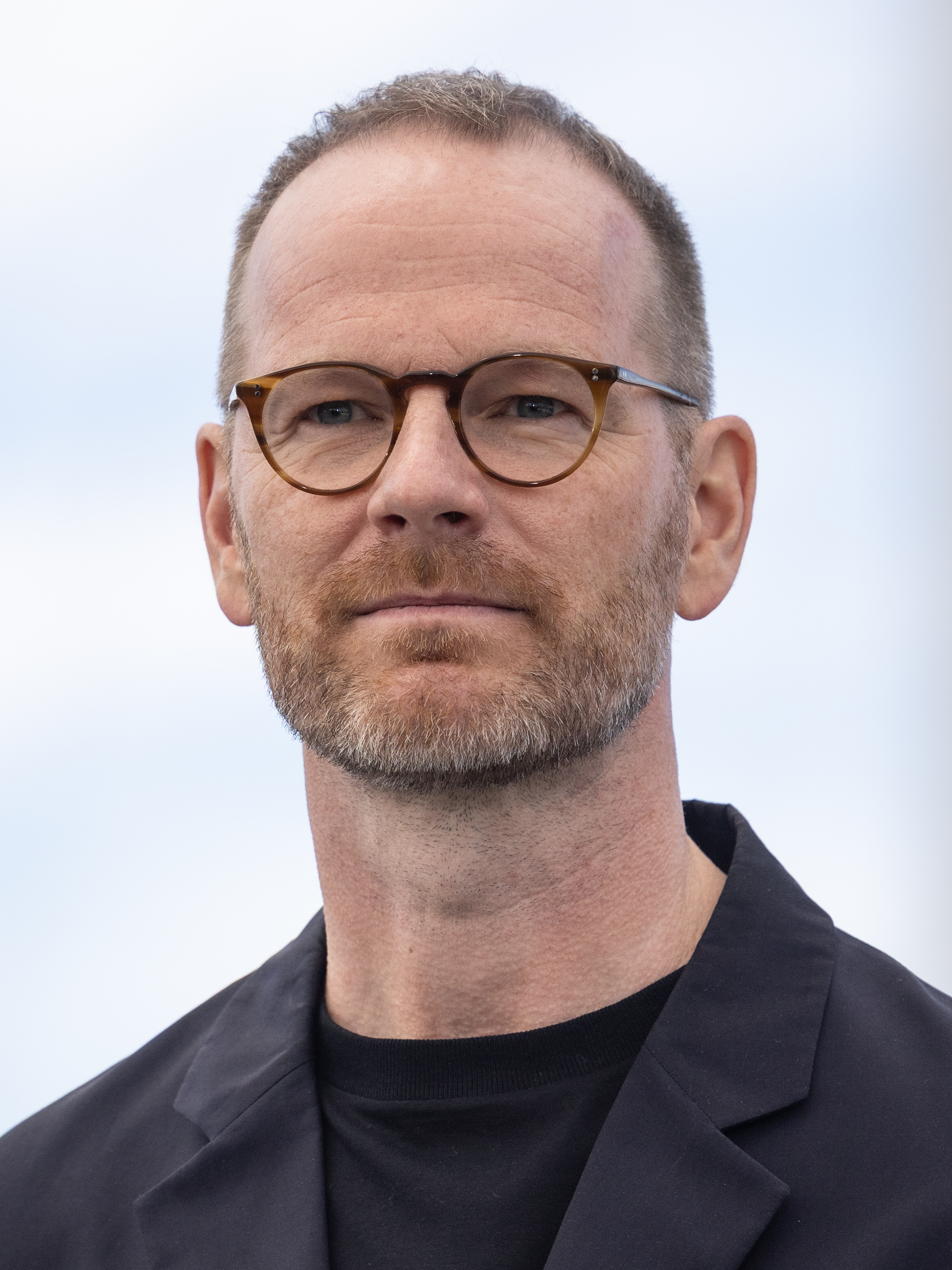
Joachim Trier, Best Film Not in the English Language co-winner

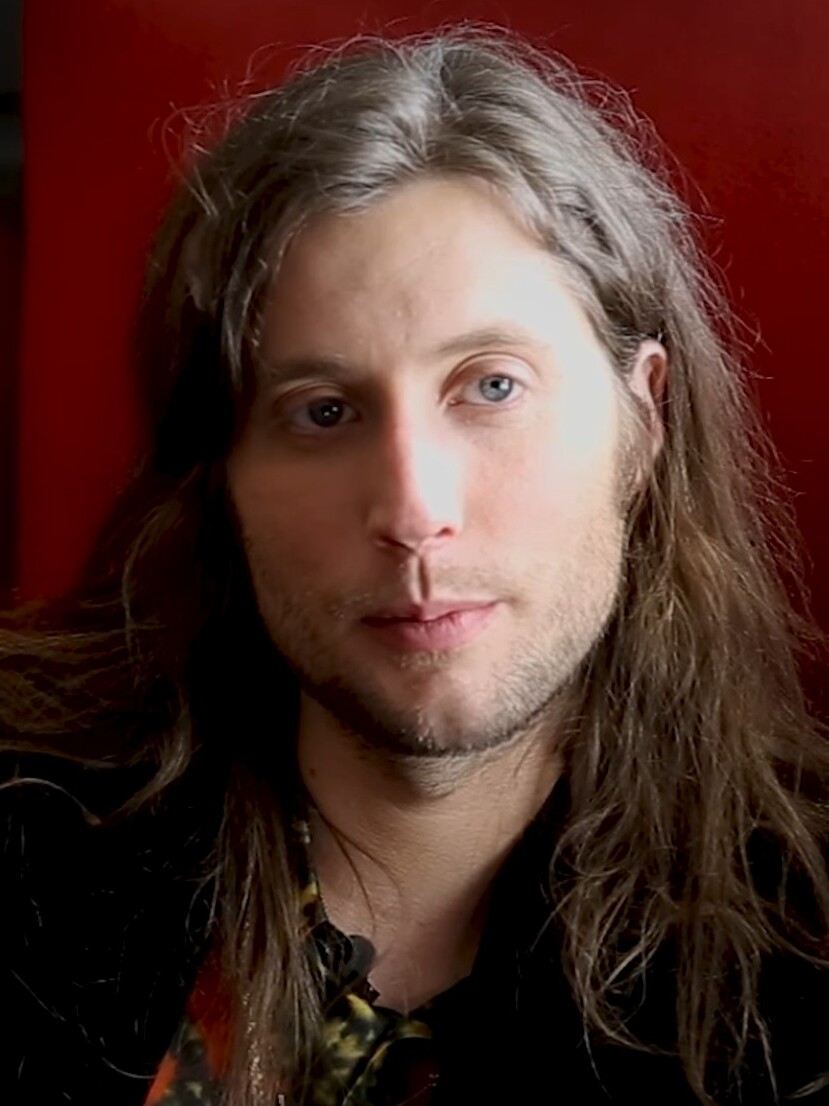
Ludwig Göransson, Best Original Score winner

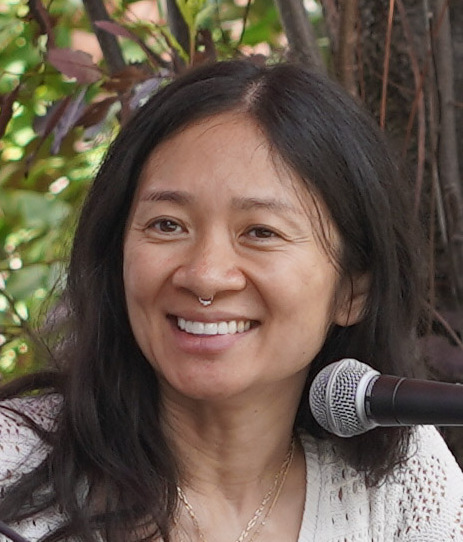
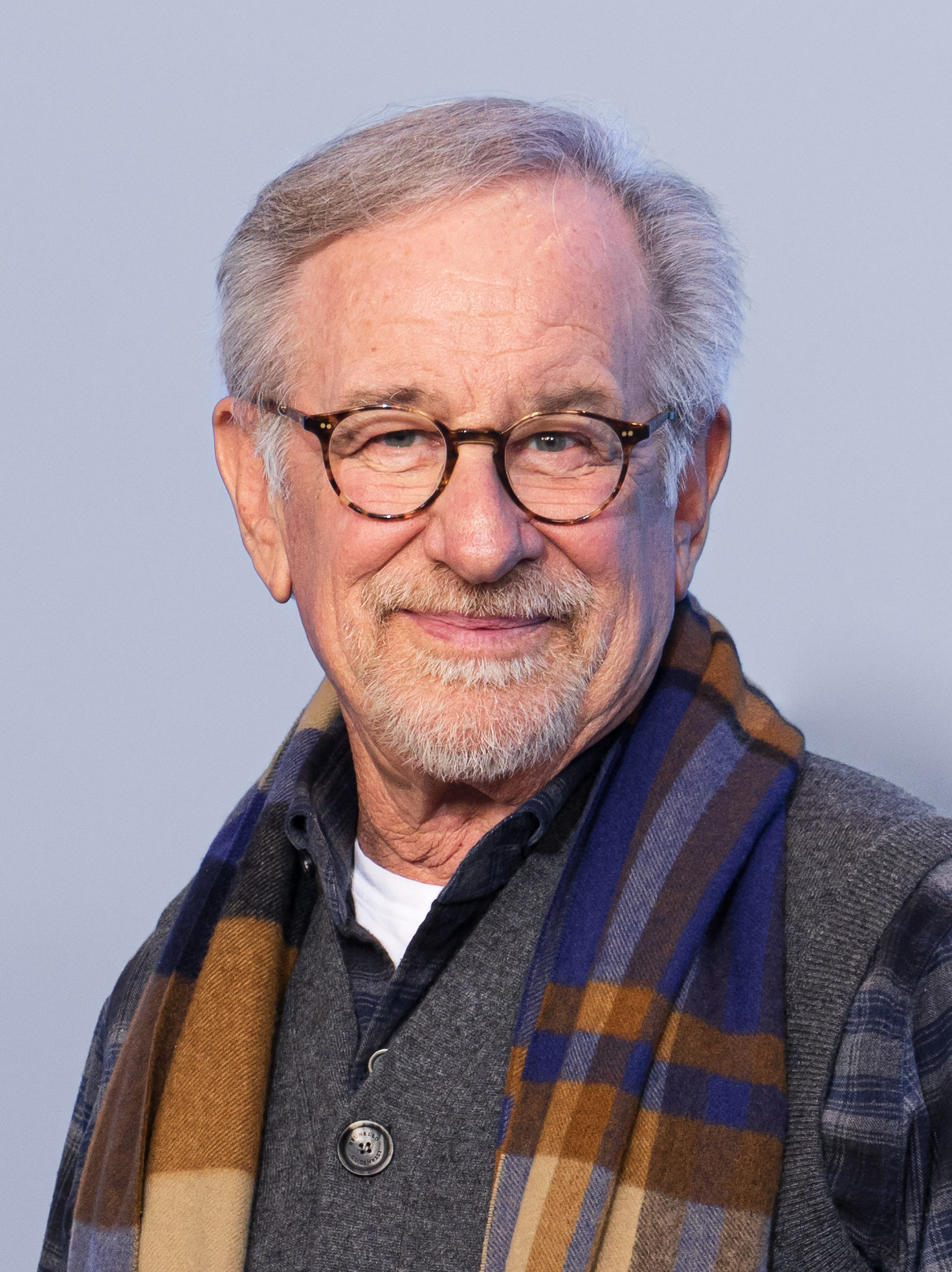
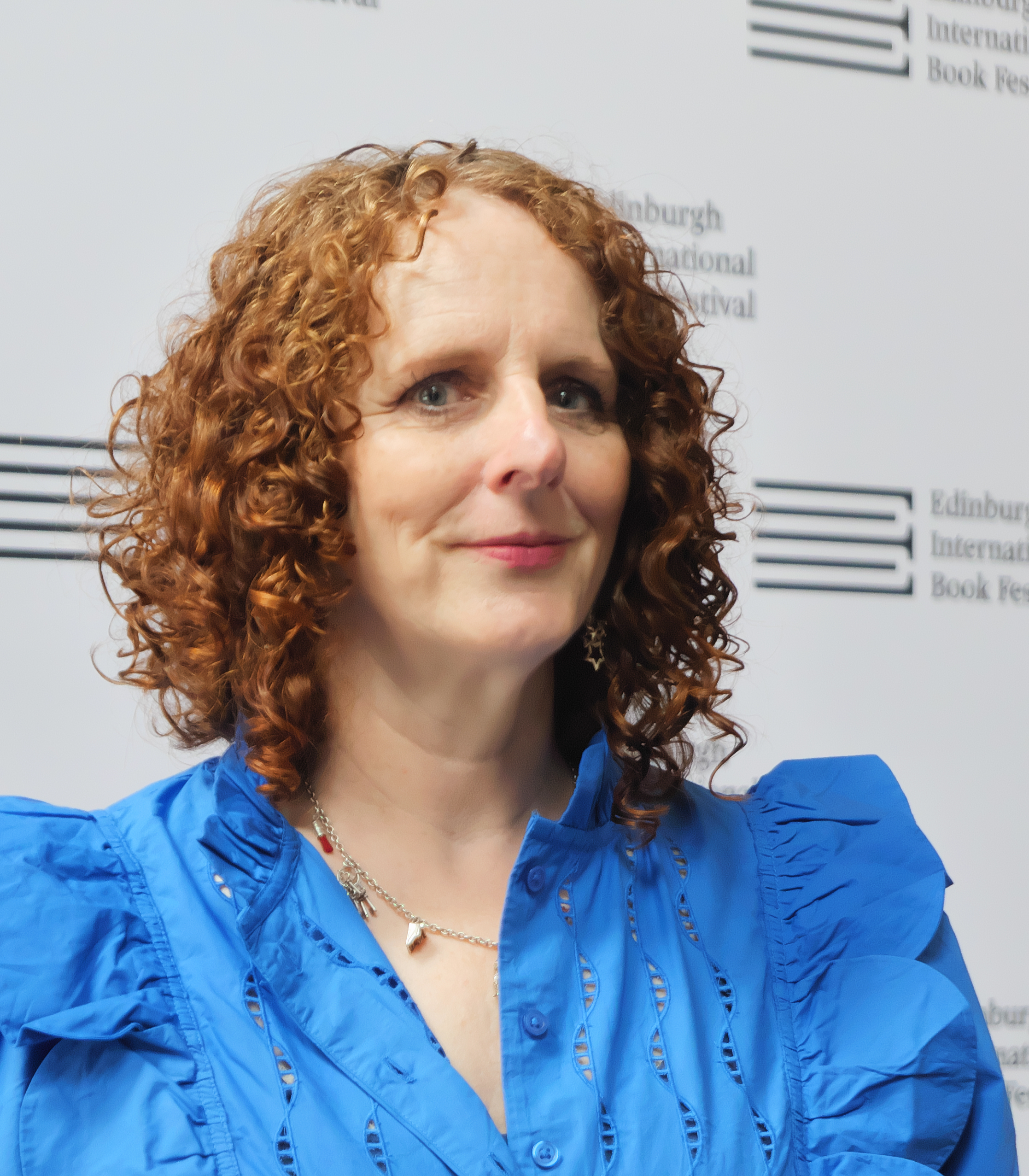
Chloé Zhao, Steven Spielberg and Maggie O'Farrell, Best British Film co-winners

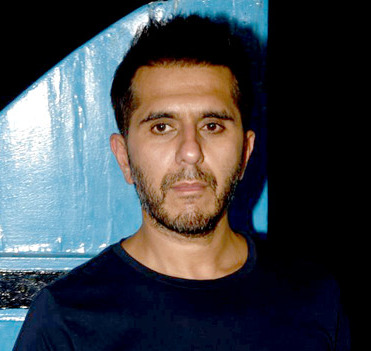
Ritesh Sidhwani, Best Children's & Family Film co-winner

The BAFTA longlists were announced on 9 January 2026. The nominees were announced on 27 January 2026. The winners were announced on 22 February 2026.

=== BAFTA Fellowship ===
The BAFTA Fellowship recipient was announced on 11 February 2026.

- **Donna Langley**

=== Outstanding British Contribution to Cinema ===
The Outstanding Contribution Award recipient was announced on 19 January 2026.

- **Clare Binns**

=== Awards ===
Winners are listed first and highlighted in boldface.

**Best Film**: **One Battle After Another – Adam Somner, (Note: Posthumous award) Sara Murphy, and Paul Thomas Anderson**; Hamnet – Liza Marshall, Pippa Harris, Nicolas Gonda, Steven Spielberg, and Sam Mendes; Marty Supreme – Timothée Chalamet, Anthony Katagas, Eli Bush, Ronald Bronstein, and Josh Safdie; Sentimental Value – Maria Ekerhovd and Andrea Berentsen Ottmar; Sinners – Zinzi Coogler, Sev Ohanian, and Ryan Coogler	**Best Director**: **Paul Thomas Anderson – One Battle After Another**; Ryan Coogler – Sinners; Yorgos Lanthimos – Bugonia; Josh Safdie – Marty Supreme; Joachim Trier – Sentimental Value; Chloé Zhao – Hamnet
**Best Actor in a Leading Role**: **Robert Aramayo – I Swear as John Davidson**; Timothée Chalamet – Marty Supreme as Marty Mauser; Leonardo DiCaprio – One Battle After Another as Bob Ferguson; Ethan Hawke – Blue Moon as Lorenz Hart; Michael B. Jordan – Sinners as Elijah "Smoke" Moore / Elias "Stack" Moore; Jesse Plemons – Bugonia as Teddy Gatz	**Best Actress in a Leading Role**: **Jessie Buckley – Hamnet as Agnes Shakespeare**; Rose Byrne – If I Had Legs I'd Kick You as Linda; Kate Hudson – Song Sung Blue as Claire Sardina; Chase Infiniti – One Battle After Another as Willa Ferguson; Renate Reinsve – Sentimental Value as Nora Borg; Emma Stone – Bugonia as Michelle Fuller
**Best Actor in a Supporting Role**: **Sean Penn – One Battle After Another as Col. Steven J. Lockjaw**; Benicio del Toro – One Battle After Another as Sensei Sergio St. Carlos; Jacob Elordi – Frankenstein as The Creature; Paul Mescal – Hamnet as William Shakespeare; Peter Mullan – I Swear as Tommy Trotter; Stellan Skarsgård – Sentimental Value as Gustav Borg	**Best Actress in a Supporting Role**: **Wunmi Mosaku – Sinners as Annie**; Odessa A'zion – Marty Supreme as Rachel Mizler; Inga Ibsdotter Lilleaas – Sentimental Value as Agnes Borg Pettersen; Carey Mulligan – The Ballad of Wallis Island as Nell Mortimer; Teyana Taylor – One Battle After Another as Perfidia Beverly Hills; Emily Watson – Hamnet as Mary Shakespeare
**Best Original Screenplay**: **Ryan Coogler – Sinners**; Ronald Bronstein and Josh Safdie – Marty Supreme; Kleber Mendonça Filho – The Secret Agent; Kirk Jones – I Swear; Eskil Vogt and Joachim Trier – Sentimental Value	**Best Adapted Screenplay**: **Paul Thomas Anderson – One Battle After Another**; Tom Basden and Tim Key – The Ballad of Wallis Island; Harry Lighton – Pillion; Will Tracy – Bugonia; Chloé Zhao and Maggie O'Farrell – Hamnet
**Best Animated Film**: **Zootopia 2 (Note: Known as Zootropolis 2 in the UK) – Jared Bush, Byron Howard, and Yvett Merino**; Elio – Madeline Sharafian, Domee Shi, Adrian Molina, and Mary Alice Drumm; Little Amélie or the Character of Rain – Maïlys Vallade, Liane-Cho Han, Nidia Santiago, Edwina Liard, Claire Le Combe, and Henri Magalon	**Best Documentary**: **Mr Nobody Against Putin – David Borenstein, Pavel Talankin, Helle Faber, Radovan Síbrt, and Alžběta Karásková**; 2000 Meters to Andriivka – Mstyslav Chernov, Michelle Mizner, and Raney Aronson-Rath; Apocalypse in the Tropics – Petra Costa and Alessandra Orofino; Cover-Up – Laura Poitras, Mark Obenhaus, Olivia Streisand, and Yoni Golijev; The Perfect Neighbor – Geeta Gandbhir, Alisa Payne, Nikon Kwantu, and Sam Bisbee
**Best Film Not in the English Language**: **Sentimental Value – Joachim Trier, Maria Ekerhovd, and Andrea Berentsen Ottmar**; It Was Just an Accident – Jafar Panahi and Philippe Martin; The Secret Agent – Kleber Mendonça Filho and Emilie Lesclaux; Sirāt – Oliver Laxe and Domingo Corral; The Voice of Hind Rajab – Kaouther Ben Hania and Nadim Cheikhrouha	**Best Casting**: **I Swear – Lauren Evans**; Marty Supreme – Jennifer Venditti; One Battle After Another – Cassandra Kulukundis; Sentimental Value – Yngvill Kolset Haga and Avy Kaufman; Sinners – Francine Maisler
**Best Cinematography**: **One Battle After Another – Michael Bauman**; Frankenstein – Dan Laustsen; Marty Supreme – Darius Khondji; Sinners – Autumn Durald Arkapaw; Train Dreams – Adolpho Veloso	**Best Costume Design**: **Frankenstein – Kate Hawley**; Hamnet – Malgosia Turzanska; Marty Supreme – Miyako Bellizzi; Sinners – Ruth E. Carter; Wicked: For Good – Paul Tazewell
**Best Editing**: **One Battle After Another – Andy Jurgensen**; F1 – Stephen Mirrione; A House of Dynamite – Kirk Baxter; Marty Supreme – Ronald Bronstein and Josh Safdie; Sinners – Michael P. Shawver	**Best Make Up & Hair**: **Frankenstein – Jordan Samuel, Cliona Furey, Mike Hill, and Megan Many**; Hamnet – Nicole Stafford; Marty Supreme – Kyra Panchenko, Kay Georgiou, and Mike Fontaine; Sinners – Siân Richards, Shunika Terry, Ken Diaz, and Mike Fontaine; Wicked: For Good – Frances Hannon, Laura Blount, Mark Coulier, and Sarah Nuth
**Best Original Score**: **Sinners – Ludwig Göransson**; Bugonia – Jerskin Fendrix; Frankenstein – Alexandre Desplat; Hamnet – Max Richter; One Battle After Another – Jonny Greenwood	**Best Production Design**: **Frankenstein – Tamara Deverell and Shane Vieau**; Hamnet – Fiona Crombie and Alice Felton; Marty Supreme – Jack Fisk and Adam Willis; One Battle After Another – Florencia Martin and Anthony Carlino; Sinners – Hannah Beachler and Monique Champagne
**Best Sound**: **F1 – Gareth John, Al Nelson, Gwendolyn Yates Whittle, Gary A. Rizzo, and Juan Peralta**; Frankenstein – Greg Chapman, Nathan Robitaille, Nelson Ferreira, Christian Cooke, and Brad Zoern; One Battle After Another – José Antonio García, Christopher Scarabosio, and Tony Villaflor; Sinners – Chris Welcker, Benny Burtt, Brandon Proctor, Steve Boeddeker, and Felipe Pacheco; Warfare – Mitch Lowe, Ben Barker, Howard Bargroff, and Richard Spooner	**Best Special Visual Effects**: **Avatar: Fire and Ash – Joe Letteri, Richard Baneham, Daniel Barrett, and Eric Saindon**; F1 – Ryan Tudhope, Keith Alfred Dawson, Nicolas Chevallier, and Robert Harrington; Frankenstein – Dennis Berardi, Ayo Burgess, Ivan Busquets, and José Granell; How to Train Your Dragon – Christian Manz, Francois Lambert, Glen McIntosh, and Terry Palmer; The Lost Bus – Charlie Noble, Brandon K. McLaughlin, and David Zaretti
**Outstanding British Film**: **Hamnet – Chloé Zhao, Liza Marshall, Pippa Harris, Nicolas Gonda, Steven Spielberg, Sam Mendes, and Maggie O'Farrell**; 28 Years Later – Danny Boyle, Andrew Macdonald, Peter Rice, Bernard Bellew, and Alex Garland; The Ballad of Wallis Island – James Griffiths, Rupert Majendie, Tom Basden, and Tim Key; Bridget Jones: Mad About the Boy – Michael Morris, Tim Bevan, Eric Fellner, Jo Wallett, Helen Fielding, Dan Mazer, and Abi Morgan; Die My Love – Lynne Ramsay, Martin Scorsese, Jennifer Lawrence, Justine Cirrocchi, Andrea Calderwood, Enda Walsh, and Alice Birch; H Is for Hawk – Philippa Lowthorpe, Dede Gardner, Jeremy Kleiner, and Emma Donoghue; I Swear – Kirk Jones, Georgia Bayliff, and Piers Tempest; Mr Burton – Marc Evans, Ed Talfan, Josh Hyams, Hannah Thomas, Trevor Matthews, and Tom Bullough; Pillion – Harry Lighton, Emma Norton, Lee Groombridge, Ed Guiney, and Andrew Lowe; Steve – Tim Mielants, Alan Moloney, Cillian Murphy, and Max Porter	**Outstanding Debut by a British Writer, Director or Producer**: **My Father's Shadow – Akinola Davies Jr. and Wale Davies**; The Ceremony – Jack King, Hollie Bryan, and Lucy Meer; Pillion – Harry Lighton; A Want in Her – Myrid Carten; Wasteman – Cal McMau, Hunter Andrews, and Eoin Doran
**Best British Short Animation**: **Two Black Boys in Paradise – Baz Sells, Dean Atta, and Ben Jackson**; Cardboard – J.P. Vine and Michaela Manas Malina; Solstice – Luce Angus	**Best British Short Film**: **This Is Endometriosis – Georgie Wileman, Matt Houghton, and Harriette Wright**; Magid / Zafar – Luis Hindman, Sufiyaan Salam, and Aidan Robert Brooks; Nostalgie – Kathryn Ferguson, Stacey Gregg, Marc Robinson, and Kath Mattock; Terence – Edem Kelman and Noah Reich; Welcome Home Freckles – Huiju Park and Nathan Hendren
**Best Children's & Family Film**: **Boong – Lakshmipriya Devi and Ritesh Sidhwani**; Arco – Ugo Bienvenu, Félix de Givry, Sophie Mas, and Natalie Portman; Lilo & Stitch – Dean Fleischer Camp and Jonathan Eirich; Zootopia 2 – Jared Bush, Byron Howard, and Yvett Merino	**EE Rising Star Award**: **Robert Aramayo**; Miles Caton; Chase Infiniti; Archie Madekwe; Posy Sterling

== Ceremony information ==
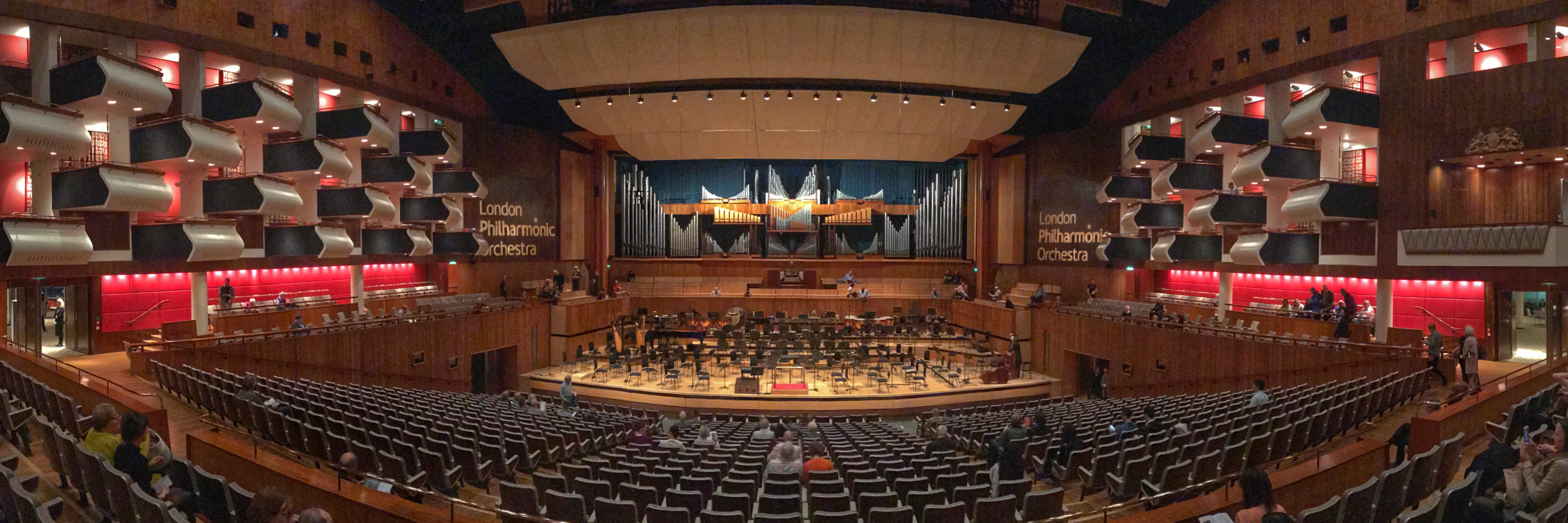
The interior of the Royal Festival Hall, which hosted the ceremony

The ceremony was held at the Royal Festival Hall within London's Southbank Centre on 22 February 2026, hosted by Alan Cumming. The nominations were announced on 27 January 2026. It was broadcast on BBC One and streamed on iPlayer in the United Kingdom at 7 p.m. GMT, and aired as a pre-recorded special on E! in the United States at 8 p.m. ET/PT, and streamed on HBO Max Australia for Australian viewers.

The BBC edited the three-hour ceremony into a two-hour broadcast window; acceptance speeches were edited, but the BBC said it would attempt to maintain the essence of what was said on stage. Ahead of the ceremony, audiences were able to watch BBC Radio 1's Clara Amfo and Ali Plumb live from the red carpet on BAFTA's YouTube channel while podcasters Benedict and Hannah Townsend reported exclusively on BAFTA's digital channels, giving viewers access to all the arrivals.

In their first live performance outside the United States, the singing voices of Huntrix from the Netflix animated musical film KPop Demon Hunters (Ejae, Audrey Nuna, and Rei Ami) performed "Golden". Emma Baehr, Executive Director of Awards & Content of BAFTA, said that KPop Demon Hunters had gained "a phenomenal impact on the hearts and minds of audiences of all ages around the world" since its release in June 2025 and that the BAFTAs were "thrilled" to have the singers of Huntrix perform at the ceremony. British singer and songwriter Jessie Ware performed during the in memoriam segment, covering the Barbra Streisand song "The Way We Were".

According to Deadline Hollywood, the BBC monitored the ceremony closely for politically-charged speeches after the UK broadcaster sparked a national scandal by streaming a Glastonbury Festival act chanting "death to the IDF" in summer 2025. The news outlet also reported that the past controversy had been a feature of contingency planning for the BAFTA Film Awards, with BBC executives and external producers at Penny Lane Entertainment keen to avoid screening any similarly controversial moments, should they occur during winner acceptance speeches. The BBC's Gaza-related media coverage has been heavily scrutinized while the BAFTAs were attended by many who are "sympathetic" to the Palestinian conflict. One such incident occurred when My Father's Shadow director Akinola Davies Jr. won Outstanding Debut by a British Writer, Director or Producer with a section of his acceptance speech being cut out from the broadcast.

Davies Jr. closed his remarks by dedicating the award to "all those whose parents migrated to obtain a better life for their children", adding, "To the economic migrant. The conflict migrant. Those under occupation, dictatorship, persecution, and those experiencing genocide. You matter. Your stories matter more than ever. Your dreams are an act of resistance to those watching at home. Archive your loved ones. Archive your stories yesterday, today, and forever. For Nigeria, for London, the Congo, Sudan, free Palestine." This part of the speech was removed from the BBC broadcast and, instead, the edit featured Davies Jr. thanking his family and his brother, Wale, for "nurturing this spark". A BBC spokesperson said: "The live event is three hours and it has to be reduced to two hours for its on-air slot. The same happened to other speeches made during the night and all edits were made to ensure the programme was delivered to time."

The following day, Davies Jr. acknowledged that edits had to be made to the broadcast but said "it's a shame" that the last part of his speech was cut, though claimed he is still proud to have used his moment in the spotlight to give a voice to those without one. "It was really important in the moment for me to say that in a room full of artists, because we have an opportunity to influence people because they watch our films", he concluded.

The ceremony was attended by BAFTA president William, Prince of Wales and Catherine, Princess of Wales. It marked the Princess's first appearance at the annual event since 2023; neither attended in 2025.

=== Criticism ===
The lack of British representation in the top acting categories sparked backlash with British fans, and film critics and journalists. Just one British actor, Robert Aramayo (for I Swear), appeared in the leading actor category, while there were no British nominees at all in the leading actress category (the UK-based Irish actress Jessie Buckley notwithstanding). Peter Mullan (for I Swear) was the only Briton nominated in the supporting actor category, while representation in the supporting actress category fared better, with Wunmi Mosaku (for Sinners), Carey Mulligan (for The Ballad of Wallis Island) and Emily Watson (for Hamnet) nominated.

For BAFTA-winning producer Rebecca O'Brien, known for her work with English filmmaker Ken Loach, the problem is structural. "In other countries, you have awards tailored to their national film industries, like the Goyas in Spain and the Césars in France", she said, adding, "The BAFTAs fall between two stools: It's both a British awards show and an Oscars bellwether. It makes sense to do both, but it's a real dilemma."

Guy Lodge of Variety argued that BAFTA should "fly its own flag a little higher", writing: "Almost every year, the BAFTA nominations are met with widespread grumbling in the U.K. industry about the lack of recognition for the home team ... prompting the question: If the BAFTAs aren't for the Brits, who are they really for? For pundits, they've certainly become a useful Oscar bellwether in the decades since they shifted their schedule to precede the American show. But shouldn't they mean more in their own right?"

=== BBC broadcast and John Davidson controversies ===
==== Incident ====
Throughout the ceremony, Tourette syndrome activist John Davidson (the topic of the film I Swear) had several tic-related outbursts, including shouting the word "nigger" while Black actors Michael B. Jordan and Delroy Lindo were presenting the first category of the night: Best Special Visual Effects. This later prompted Cumming to apologise for any strong language heard throughout the broadcast, though he thanked the audience for their "understanding" of Tourette's. Davidson later left of his own accord following the first half-hour of the ceremony. Deadline Hollywood reported that those close to Davidson said the incident spotlighted his "exhausting condition".

The BBC apologised for not editing the slur out from the broadcast. It also had a two-hour delay between the live event and the broadcast, which is ordinarily used to remove material like these slurs, but Davidson's tic-related outbursts were not removed. A second apology was later issued with BBC producers stating that they "didn't hear" the word. It was reported that the producers who oversaw the ceremony for the BBC were doing so from a truck; several other incidents of inappropriate language were cut out, including another racial slur, but that moment was missed.

The ceremony remained on BBC iPlayer overnight before being removed sometime the following morning; the BBC stated that the word would be edited out of the iPlayer version. Deadline Hollywood reported that a representative from Warner Bros. Pictures, the studio behind Sinners, which stars Jordan and Lindo, complained and raised immediate concerns to BAFTA in the minutes after the slur was shouted, requesting that the incident be removed from the broadcast; the studio reportedly received assurances that their concerns would be passed on to the BBC.

The controversy of the BBC's failure to remove the slurs was heightened by observations of other material that was removed, including political commentary; such removals included Cumming making a joke relating themes of lies and corruption in Zootopia 2 to the American political climate and Akinola Davies Jr. shouting "free Palestine" while accepting the award for Outstanding Debut by a British Writer, Director or Producer.

==== Reactions and analysis ====
Following the ceremony, Lindo spoke out about the incident, stating that he and Jordan "did what [they] had to do" while presenting, despite the word being heard across the auditorium, and wished that "someone from BAFTA spoke to [them] afterwards". Black production designer Hannah Beachler alleged that, in addition to Jordan and Lindo, Davidson had also directed racial slurs at her and another Black attendee during the ceremony, describing it as an "almost impossible" situation to address while criticising Cumming for making the situation worse with his "throwaway apology".

Black actors Jamie Foxx and Wendell Pierce condemned the moment on social media; Foxx called it "unacceptable" and suggested that Davidson's outburst was intentional by posting "he meant that shit", while Pierce deemed it "infuriating" and criticised BAFTA for prioritising Davidson's needs over Jordan's and Lindo's feelings.

UK charity Tourettes Action defended Davidson against backlash, stating: "It is vital that the public understands a fundamental truth about Tourette syndrome: tics are involuntary. They are not a reflection of a person's beliefs, intentions, or character." Speaking to the BBC, following the ceremony, actor Robert Aramayo (who portrayed Davidson in I Swear and won Best Actor in a Leading Role) spoke on the matter and defended Davidson, stating, "The way we perceive Tourette's is a joint responsibility. It's not shouting obscenities. It's not being abusive ... If it can lead to a deeper understanding of Tourette's, and movies are part of that conversation, then it's an incredible thing."

Writing for Variety, Clayton Davis criticised BAFTA's and BBC's handling of the situation by failing to inform the ceremony's participants of Davidson's condition beforehand and allowing the slur to play unedited for the tape delayed broadcast, while censoring less severe comments or remarks made by other attendees during the show. Davis, while expressing sympathy for Davidson, argued that the organizers' and Cumming's use of the words "strong language" to describe Davidson's outburst both downplayed the offensiveness behind the slur and further mischaracterized Tourette's, concluding that Davidson, Jordan, Lindo, the Tourette's community and Black people "deserved better".

Deadline Hollywood's Baz Bamigboye believed that the incident could be "a teachable moment". Stuart Heritage of The Guardian argued that the BAFTAs "must get rid of their two-hour delay and broadcast live", adding, "Last night made clear that broadcasting a partially redacted version long after the winners have been announced doesn't work for anyone."

Franklin Leonard, founder of The Black List, tweeted: "I don't know why it's so hard for people to have empathy for Michael B. Jordan, Delroy Lindo, Hannah Beachler, and John Davidson. Each of them deserves it." He later added: "A fun thought experiment is 'what would they have let Davidson yell at the Prince and Princess during the BAFTAs and still broadcast it?'" Black academic and studies professor Kehinde Andrews opined that it was "not fair" to Davidson because he would have preferred it not to have been broadcast and that it was "not his fault". Critics further noted that the BBC edited out lengthy walks to the stage and portions of speeches, including Davies Jr.'s "free Palestine" remarks, and questioned how the BBC was able to do such extensive editing, while also failing to edit out the racial slur.

Black British Labour Party politician Dawn Butler wrote to the BBC asking for an "urgent explanation" over the racial slur, declaring that it "should never have been aired" and describing the broadcast as "painful and unforgivable". New York City Public Advocate Jumaane Williams, the city's first publicly elected official with Tourette syndrome, released a video the following day in which he expressed disappointment that BAFTA did not better support all parties involved in the debacle, stating: "BAFTA could have censored the damn thing." He also urged people to have compassion for Davidson, emphasising that he had every right to attend a ceremony where a film about his life was being celebrated, adding, "We have to make sure we're ... putting the anger in the right places, but also providing empathy and care for everyone that's involved. And I believe that was dropped when it came to Michael B. Jordan and Delroy Lindo. Shout out to them. Sadly, Black people have to know how to have poise in so many situations just so they can survive."

==== Aftermath ====
Davidson later released a statement, explaining his outbursts:

I wanted to thank BAFTA and everyone involved in the awards last night for their support and understanding and inviting me to attend the broadcast. I appreciated the announcement to the auditorium in advance of the recording, warning everyone that my tics are involuntary and are not a reflection of my personal beliefs. I was heartened by the round of applause that followed this announcement and felt welcomed and understood in an environment that would normally be impossible for me. In addition to the announcement by Alan Cumming, the BBC and BAFTA, I can only add that I am, and always have been deeply mortified if anyone considers my involuntary tics to be intentional or to carry any meaning. I was in attendance to celebrate the film of my life, I Swear, which more than any film or TV documentary, explains the origins, condition, traits and manifestations of Tourette Syndrome. I have spent my life trying to support and empower the Tourette's community and to teach empathy, kindness and understanding from others and I will continue to do so. I chose to leave the auditorium early into the ceremony as I was aware of the distress my tics were causing.

BAFTA also released a full statement, addressing the incident and apologising:

We take the duty of care to all our guests very seriously and start from a position of inclusion. We took measures to make those in attendance aware of the tics, announcing to the audience before the ceremony began, and throughout, that John was in the room and that they may hear strong language, involuntary noises or movements during the ceremony. Early in the ceremony, a loud tic in the form of a profoundly offensive term was heard by many people in the room. Michael B. Jordan and Delroy Lindo were on stage at the time, and we apologise unreservedly to them, and to all those impacted. We would like to thank Michael and Delroy for their incredible dignity and professionalism.

On 24 February, BAFTA announced that a "comprehensive review is underway" in a letter to members whose language significantly overlapped the previous statement.

Speaking with Variety, during his first interview following the backlash, Davidson echoed the many commentators who had suggested that his use of the N-word should have been edited out of the broadcast. He also claimed that he was told before the ceremony that any profanity would be excluded and expressed surprise that a broadcast partner that had previously covered his condition extensively was not better prepared for potential incidents.

"StudioCanal were working closely with BAFTA and BAFTA had made us all aware that any swearing would be edited out of the broadcast", Davidson said, adding, "I have made four documentaries with the BBC in the past, and feel that they should have been aware of what to expect from Tourette's and worked harder to prevent anything that I said — which, after all, was some 40 rows back from the stage — from being included in the broadcast."

While Davidson maintained that Tourette syndrome should not bar anyone from attending award shows or other public events, he also questioned the decision to seat him near a microphone, which could have amplified his outbursts that might have otherwise gone unnoticed by people onstage and watching at home. "As I reflect on the auditorium, I remember there was a microphone just in front of me", he said. "With hindsight I have to question whether this was wise, so close to where I was seated, knowing I would tic." He concluded the interview by stating that "it's important not to use the word 'disability'. This is considered a 'condition' by the Tourette's community".

On 28 February, during the 57th NAACP Image Awards, presented by the American-based National Association for the Advancement of Colored People (NAACP), actress Regina Hall gave Jordan and Lindo a special shout-out before presenting the first award of the night. Shifting attention to the duo, Hall gestured towards Jordan and Lindo, and asked the audience to "take a moment for the two kings who are in this audience", adding, "[I] just send you so much love for your class." Those in attendance subsequently gave both actors a standing ovation to salute them. Taking to the stage to present an award with Sinners filmmaker Ryan Coogler later during the evening, both received a standing ovation. "I appreciate, we appreciate, all the support and the love that we have been shown in the aftermath of what happened last weekend. It means a lot to us", Lindo said, adding, "It is an honor to be here amongst our people ... It's a classic case of something that could be very negative becoming very positive."

At the same event, host Deon Cole targeted Davidson with a joke, concerning his condition and the slur itself, that the audience enjoyed. "If there are any white men out here in the audience, Lord, with Tourette's, I advise you to tell them they'd better read the room tonight, Lord", Cole said in a mock prayer, adding, "It might not go the way they thinketh [sic]. Whatever medicine they're on, they'd better double up on it, Lord."

On 2 March, a week after the ceremony, Cumming posted a lengthier apology on social media, writing: "What should've been an evening celebrating creativity as well as diversity and inclusion turned into a trauma triggering shitshow. I'm so sorry for all the pain Black people have felt at hearing that word echoed around the world. I'm so sorry the Tourettes community has been reminded of the lack of understanding and tolerance that abounds regarding their condition." Cumming further criticised the BBC's decision "to both broadcast slurs and censor free speech" before congratulating the ceremony's winners.

Deadline Hollywood also reported that a "difficult" meeting between the BBC and Warner Bros. had taken place. Warner Bros. executives were said to have pressed the BBC for answers about why the racial slur made the final cut, despite the BAFTAs being recorded two hours before broadcasting on television. Questions were also raised about why the incident remained on iPlayer for fifteen hours, even though the BBC was aware that the slur was audible. They also demanded to know what steps the BBC would take to prevent a similar incident from happening again. One person briefed on the encounter said that "they were furious". Warner executives had initially sought a meeting with the BBC on the Monday following the ceremony, but were left "frustrated" when the gathering did not materialise.

On 6 March, following the BBC's review and investigation, it was announced that then-Director-General of the BBC Tim Davie answered questions from the UK government's Culture, Media and Sport Committee over the incident. In a letter to committee chair Dame Caroline Dinenage, Davie explained why the N-word outburst was not edited out, asserting that it was a "genuine mistake" and the BBC takes "full responsibility" for it. He also wrote that the BBC's "initial evidence gathering" found that no one in the on-site broadcast truck heard the initial outburst when they were watching the live feed and that "there was therefore no editorial decision made to leave the language in". However, he noted that a second outburst of the word occurred, while Wunmi Mosaku accepted her award for Best Actress in a Supporting Role, writing: "In that instance, the edit team did hear the racial slur on the feed and removed it immediately from the version of the ceremony that would be broadcast later that evening. This was in line with protocols and procedures that were in place for this event." The mistake occurred, he claimed, when the edit team started received reports about a racial slur, "including from BAFTA", explaining, "Our understanding at this point is that the team editing the show in the truck mistakenly believed they had edited out the incident that was being referenced, on the basis that they had heard and edited out the slur shouted out during the best supporting actress award. Therefore, when they were told a racial slur had been shouted, they believed they had removed it."

On 8 April 2026, the BBC's Executive Complaints Unit (ECU) issued the findings of its investigation. According to the ECU, the inclusion of Davidson's outburst in the broadcast "had no editorial justification and represented a breach of the BBC's editorial standards, but that the breach was unintentional". Actions were also taken to prevent future breaches, and letters of apology were sent to Davidson, Jordan and Lindo.

== In Memoriam ==
The In Memoriam montage was played to the song "The Way We Were", performed by Jessie Ware, and paid tribute to the following:

- Diane Keaton – actress
- Terence Stamp – actor
- Catherine O'Hara – actress
- Rob Reiner – director, producer, actor
- Robert Duvall – actor
- Gene Hackman – actor
- Pauline Collins OBE – actress
- Sir Tom Stoppard – playwright, screenwriter
- Brigitte Bardot – actress
- Udo Kier – actor
- Dharmendra – actor
- Graham Greene – actor
- Diane Ladd – actress
- Susie Figgis – casting director
- Stuart Craig – production designer
- Lalo Schifrin – composer
- Jimmy Cliff – musician
- Greg Cannom – make up artist
- Tina Earnshaw – make up artist
- Val Kilmer – actor
- Lesley Walker – editor
- Lee Tamahori – director
- Bill Stephens – executive
- Presley Chweneyagae – actor
- Michael Madsen – actor
- Marcel Ophuls – filmmaker, documentarian
- Mark Peploe – screenwriter
- Joe Dunton MBE – cinematographer, camera innovator
- Peter Young – set decorator
- Robert Redford – actor, producer, director

== Statistics ==
Films that received multiple nominations
Nominations	Film
14	One Battle After Another (Note: Not counting the EE Rising Star Award)
13	Sinners
11	Hamnet
11	Marty Supreme
8	Frankenstein
8	Sentimental Value
5	Bugonia
5	I Swear
3	The Ballad of Wallis Island
3	F1
3	Pillion
2	The Secret Agent
2	Wicked: For Good
2	Zootopia 2

Films that received multiple awards
Awards	Film
6	One Battle After Another
3	Frankenstein
3	Sinners
2	Hamnet
2	I Swear

== See also ==
- 15th AACTA International Awards
- 98th Academy Awards
- 32nd Actor Awards
- 53rd Annie Awards
- 14th Canadian Screen Awards
- 51st César Awards
- 31st Critics' Choice Awards
- 78th Directors Guild of America Awards
- 38th European Film Awards
- 83rd Golden Globe Awards
- 46th Golden Raspberry Awards
- 40th Goya Awards
- 41st Independent Spirit Awards
- 31st Lumière Awards
- 15th Magritte Awards
- 13th Platino Awards
- 37th Producers Guild of America Awards
- 30th Satellite Awards
- 53rd Saturn Awards
- 78th Writers Guild of America Awards
