= Talankin =

Talankin (Russian: Таланкин; feminine: Talankina (Таланкина)) is a Russian surname. Notable people with the surname include:

- Igor Talankin (1927–2010), Russian film director and screenwriter
- Pavel Talankin (born 1991), Russian teacher and filmmaker
