= Helle Faber =

Danish film producer

- Born: November 15, 1966 (age 59); Herning, Denmark
- Occupation: Producer
- Organization: Made in Copenhagen ApS
- Awards: 2026 Academy Award for Best Documentary Feature. Other awards, see filmography.
- Website: madeincopenhagen.dk/en

Helle Faber is a Danish film producer and CEO for the production company Made in Copenhagen.

== Career ==
Faber graduated as a journalist from the Danish School of Media and Journalism in 1991 and subsequently worked at DR (Danish Broadcasting Corporation) until 2003. In 2003, she was hired as a producer at Bastard Film and at one point also became co-owner of the company before it was acquired by Monday Media in 2009. It was at Bastard Film that the foundation of her career in film production was established. In 2010, she founded her own production company, Made in Copenhagen, where she serves as a creative producer and director.

As a producer, she is behind internationally acclaimed titles, such as the Oscar, BAFTA and Peabody winner Mr. Nobody Against Putin (2025) directed by David Borenstein and Pavel Talankin, Mummy's Boys (2025) directed by Jesper Dalgaard, Theatre of Violence (2023) directed by Emil Langballe, The Chocolate War (2022) directed by Miki Mistrati, and Warriors from the North (2014) directed by Søren Steen Jespersen.

In 2026, Helle Faber became the first Dane ever to win an Academy Award for Best Documentary Feature with Mr. Nobody Against Putin, which also won a BAFTA Award for best documentary (also as the first Dane ever), a Peabody Award, a Robert, a Bodil, and more than 20 other awards.

Faber is a member of the Producers Guild of America. and the Academy of Motion Picture Arts and Sciences (AMPAS).

== Filmography ==
- 2025 - Mr. Nobody Against Putin, directed by David Borenstein & Pavel Talankin
  - Awards: Academy Award for Best Documentary Feature 2026, Peabody Award for Best Documentary 2026, BAFTA Award for Best Documentary 2026, Bodil Award for Best Documentary 2026, TVPRISEN Award for Best Documentary 2026, Robert Award for Best Documentary Feature 2026, Sundance Film Festival Special Jury Award 2025, Docville TOPICS Award 2025, ZagrebDox The Big Stamp Award 2025
- 2025 - Mummy's Boys, directed by Jesper Dalgaard
- 2025 - The Golden Swan (co-producer), directed by Anette Ostrø
- 2024 - Ungeren, directed by Mads Matthiesen
- 2024 - Leaving Jesus (co-producer), directed by Ellen Fiske
- 2023 - Theatre of Violence, directed by Emil Langballe & Lukasz Konopa
  - Awards: Movies That Matter Festival Grand Jury Documentary Award 2023, Millennium Docs Against Gravity Best Cinematography Award 2023
- 2023 - The Mountains (executive producer), directed by Christian Einshøj
- 2022 - The Chocolate War, directed by Miki Mistrati
- 2022 - An Eternity of You and Me (executive producer), directed by Sanne This
- 2021 - Dark Blossom (executive producer), directed by Frigge Fri
- 2021 - Follow You Home (executive producer), directed by Kathrine Ravn Kruse
- 2021 - Skál (executive producer), directed by Cecilie Debell & Maria Tórgar∂
- 2021 - Bellum – The Daemon of War (co-producer), directed by David Herdies & Georg Götmark
- 2019 - Det Sorte Kapitel, directed by Maya Albana
- 2019 - A Married Couple, directed by Emil Langballe
- 2019 - Long, Live, Love, directed by Sine Skibsholt
- 2018 - Lost Warrior, directed by Søren Steen Jespersen & Nasib Farah
- 2018 - Reconstruction Utøya (co-producer), directed by Carl Javér
- 2018 - Doel (executive producer), directed Frederik Sølberg
- 2017 - The Stranger, directed by Nicole N. Horanyi
  - Awards: Doc NYC Viewfinders Competition 2017
- 2017 - Life as a Grown Up, directed by Anders Gustafsson
- 2016 - Motley's Law, directed by Nicole N. Horanyi
  - Awards: Doc NYC Viewfinders Competition 2015
- 2016 - Who We Were, directed by Sine Skibsholt
  - Awards: Robert Award for Best Documentary Feature 2017, BILLED-BLADETS TV-GULD Award for Best Documentary 2017, TVPRISEN Award for Best Documentary 2017, International Documentary Film Festival Amsterdam First Appearance Award 2016
- 2016 - The Wait, directed by Emil Langballe
- 2014 - Warriors from the North, directed by Søren Steen Jespersen
  - Awards: Hot Docs Canadian International Documentary Festival for Best Mid-Length Documentary 2015, One World Film Festival Student Jury Award 2015
- 2014 - Embracing the Dead, directed by Nanna Frank Møller
- 2014 - Naked, directed by Nicole N. Horanyi
- 2013 - Blood Ties, directed by Christian Sønderby Jepsen & Pernille Bervald Jørgensen
- 2013 - Light Fly, Fly High (co-producer), directed by Susann Østigaard & Breathe Hofseth
- 2012 - Putin's Kiss, directed by Lise Birk Pedersen
  - Awards: Bodil Award for Best Documentary 2013, TVPRISEN Award for Best Documentary 2012, Sundance Film Festival World Cinema Cinematography Award: Documentary 2012, Nordic Panorama Film Festival Honorary Mention 2012
- 2012 - The Shady Chocolate, directed by Miki Mistrati
- 2011 - My Beautiful Daughter, directed by Maya Albana
- 2011 - Med Døden til Følge, directed by Eva Mulvad
- 2011 - Village at the End of the World, directed by Sarah Gavron
- 2011 - Au Pair, directed by Nicole N. Horanyi & Heidi Kim Andersen
- 2010 - Convicted for Terror, directed by Christian Sønderby Jepsen, Miki Mistrati & Nagieb Khaja
- 2009 - Invisible Girls, directed by Sidse Stausholm
- 2009 - Shanghai Spaces, directed by Nanna Frank Møller
- 2009 - Mirror, directed by Joachim Ladefoged
- 2009 - Accidental Terrorist, directed by Miki Mistrati & Nagieb Khaja
- 2009 - The Boys from Senior Class, directed by Jannik Splidsboel
- 2009 - Big Girls Don't Cry, directed by Louise Unmack Kjeldsen
- 2009 - A Feminine Boy, directed by Nanna Frank Møller
- 2008 - Little Miss Grown-Up, directed by Patrik Book & Anders Gustafsson
  - Awards: Robert Awards for Best Documentary Short 2009
- 2008 - Enemies of Happiness, directed by Eva Mulvad
  - Awards: Cinema for Peace International Human Rights Film Award 2008, Sundance Film Festival Grand Jury Prize: World Cinema Documentary 2007
- 2007 - The World in Denmark, directed by Max Kestner
  - Awards: Robert Awards for Best Documentary Short 2008
