= Poet on a Business Trip =

- Directed by: Ju Anqi
- Screenplay by: Ju Anqi
- Produced by: Fang Li, Li Zhenhua
- Starring: Shu
- Cinematography: Ju Anqi
- Edited by: Wang Kang
- Music by: Li Yuan; Ma Yuanyuan
- Production company: Trench Film Group 壕沟电影
- Release date: January 23, 2015 (IFFR)
- Running time: 103 minutes
- Country: China
- Languages: Mandarin; Uyghur

Poet on a Business Trip (Chinese: 诗人出差了; pinyin: shī rén chū chai le) is a 2015 Chinese documentary film directed, written and cinematographed by Ju Anqi (雎安奇). Originally shot in colour but edited to black-and-white, it follows a poet as he travels through Xinjiang Uygur Autonomous Region to write a series of 16 poems.

It made its world premiere at the 2015 International Film Festival Rotterdam and its Asian premiere at the 16th Jeonju International Film Festival, winning the NETPAC Award and the International Competition's grand prize, respectively.

== Synopsis ==
Poet, Shu, adventures across China's remote Xinjiang region on what he describes as a “business trip”. The tour starts out with copious amounts of drinking and eating, and chewing the fat with truck drivers and fellow bus passengers while going from seedy barbecue joints to hotels to brothels. The strange, ephemeral encounters set against the vast, diverse landscape inspire Shu to write 16 poems that astutely capture this particular moment in time in the region with a mixture of sardonic wit, satirical astuteness, bawdy charm and surreal humor.

== Production ==
In 2002, director Ju and Chinese actor-poet Shu (who played the title character) took a train from Beijing to Xinjiang Uygur Autonomous Region, 4000 kilometers away. In inhospitable and impoverished conditions, the two began to record their adventure on a 40-day journey across the whole of Xinjiang. A decade-long dispute between Ju and Shu put the project on hold. It was not until 2013 that Ju started editing the material and finished it in 2014. The film was initially just produced by Laurel Film founder and producer, Fang Li, but the project was also later taken on by the esteemed international curator and producer, Li Zhenhua. With the help of Li Zhenhua (producer), Wang Kang (editor), and Emma Chibulu (associate producer), and the returning Shu 竖(pseudonym for actor and poet Hou Xianbo 侯献波), Ju Anqi finally completed the film.

== Reception ==
Poet on a Business Trip was lauded by the Jeonju International Film Festival's International Competition jury member as "simple, curious, artful and ultimately very moving," where it won the Grand Prize. The film won the 2015 NETPAC Award at International Film Festival Rotterdam, where it had also received funding by the Hubert Bals Fund. It received special screenings at Film at Lincoln Center, New York, Xcèntric 2017, Centre de Cultura Contemporània de Barcelona, and was selected by numerous other international film festivals, such as in Visions du Réel, Panorama at Singapore International Film Festival, Viennale International Film Festival, etc.

== Awards and nominations ==
Year	Award	Category	Recipient	Result
2015	43rd International Film Festival Rotterdam	NETPAC Award (Best Asian Film)	Poet on a Business Trip	Won
2015	16th Jeonju International Film Festival	Grand Prize (International Competition)	Poet on a Business Trip	Won
2016	12th ZagrebDox International Documentary Film Festival	Best Film (International Competition)	Poet on a Business Trip	Won
