= Karabash, Chelyabinsk Oblast =

Karabash Карабаш
- Town
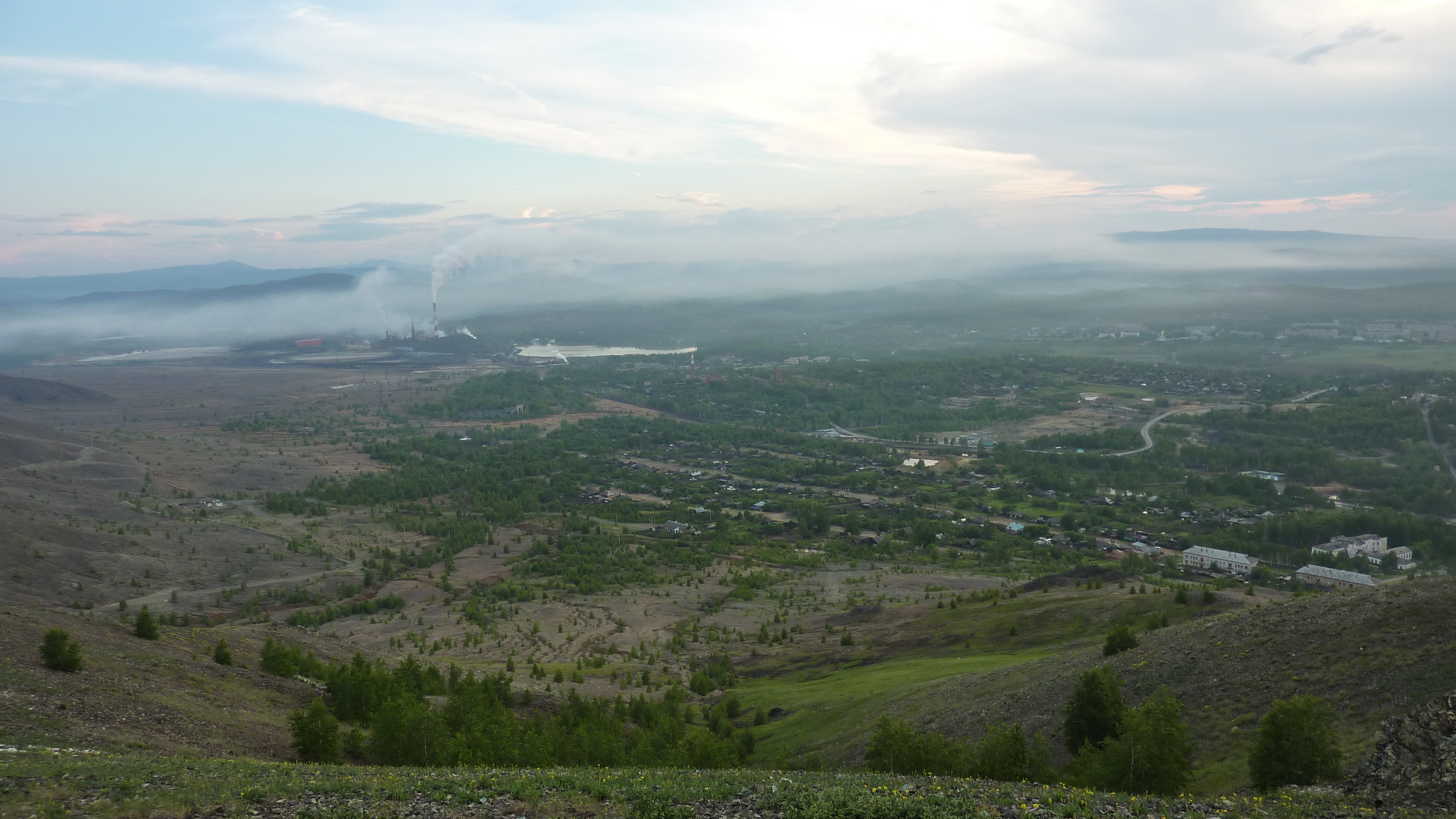

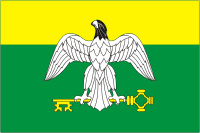
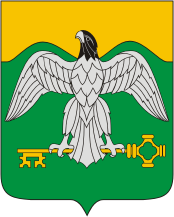
- Flag Coat of arms
- Interactive map of Karabash
- Location of Karabash Karabash (Chelyabinsk Oblast)
- Coordinates: 55°29′N 60°13′E
- Country: Russia
- Federal subject: Chelyabinsk Oblast
- Founded: 1822
- Town status since: June 20, 1933

Government
  - Body: Assembly of Deputies
  - Head: Mussa Dzugayev
- Elevation: 350 m (1,150 ft)

Population (2010 Census)
  - Total: 13,152
  - Estimate (2023): 10,339 (−21.4%)

Administrative status
  - Subordinated to: Town of Karabash
  - Capital of: Town of Karabash

Municipal status
  - Urban okrug: Karabashsky Urban Okrug
  - Capital of: Karabashsky Urban Okrug
- Time zone: UTC+5 (MSK+2)
- Postal code: 454000
- Dialing code: +7 35153
- OKTMO ID: 75715000001
- Website: karabash-go.ru

Karabash (Russian: Карабаш) is a town in Chelyabinsk Oblast, Russia, located 90 kilometers (56 mi) northwest of Chelyabinsk. Population: 13,152 (2010 census); 15,942 (2002 Census); 17,006 (1989 Soviet census).

== Toponymy ==
The town's name, Karabash, means "black peak" in numerous Turkic languages.

== History ==
It was founded in 1822 as a settlement of gold-miners. While gold mining was the town's original main industry, large deposits of copper were subsequently discovered near Karabash. In 1837, the town's first copper smelting plant was built, which existed for just five years, and proved to be less economically lucrative than the town's gold industry. A second copper smeltery was built in 1907, but lasted for only three years. In 1910, a new copper smelting plant was built in Karabash, which remains the town's primary plant. The plant achieved much more success than its predecessors, spurring substantial growth in the town during the early 1910s, and produced one-third of all smelted copper in Russia by 1915.

During the Russian Civil War, copper production in Karabash stopped, and the local copper mines became flooded.

The town's copper mines were gradually restored from 1926 to 1929, and copper production grew significantly in the following years. Town status was granted to Karabash on June 20, 1933. By 1935, the town was producing more than three times the smelted copper than it did in 1917. Prior to World War II, the population of Karabash reached approximately 50,000 people. Approximately 5,000 Karabash residents went on to fight in the Eastern Front during the war. From the 1950s through the 1970s, Karabash continued to modernize, aided by mass electrification, the introduction of a gas pipeline, and the construction of water treatment facilities. During this time, housing construction also boomed.

However, during the 1970s, Soviet authorities closed a number of copper mines in Karabash, and attempted to introduce non-mining industries to Karabash, such as a factory producing radios, and another producing clothing. Despite this, Karabash's population fell dramatically. In November 1989, Soviet authorities closed the copper works in town, citing its environmental impact.

A study by the Chelyabinsk Oblast's regional government in 1994 found significant negative health effects in the town, including high rates of stunted growth and birth defects. The country's environmental ministry declared the area an environmental disaster zone in 1996. Despite this, a private company acquired the plant in 1998, and restarted its operations. In 2004, Russian Copper Company, a private company acquired the plant.

In 2015, a protest against the environmental and health effects of the town's copper smeltery was attended by approximately 500 people.

== Geography ==
Karabash is located along the Sak-Elga River.

== Administrative and municipal status ==
Within the framework of administrative divisions, it is, together with nine rural localities, incorporated as the Town of Karabash—an administrative unit with the status equal to that of the districts. As a municipal division, the Town of Karabash is incorporated as Karabashsky Urban Okrug.

== Economy ==
Karabash's copper industry dominates the town's local economy. An article by openDemocracy in 2018 stated that 10% of residents in Karabash are employed by the local copper smeltery. Local salaries for employees of the copper plant is significantly higher than other private sector jobs in the area.

== Environment ==
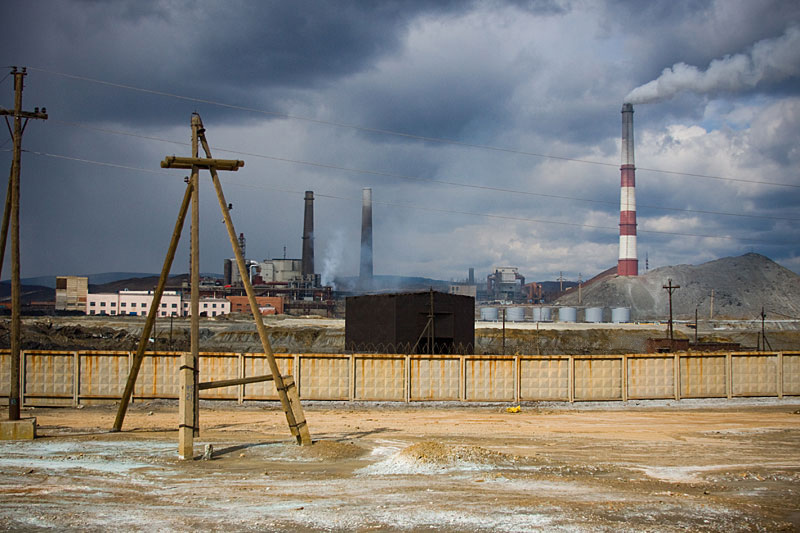
Copper smelting plant in Karabash

A copper smelting plant is situated in the town, which has created extremely large amounts of pollution and serious health problems for the inhabitants. Karabash's inhabitants suffer from an unusually high mortality rate from cancer and respiratory diseases, linked to the plant. Research done in 2011 showed exceptionally high quantities of heavy metals and arsenic in the local air, ground, and water. Numerous studies have shown that Karabash suffers the highest mortality rate in Chelyabinsk Oblast, the highest mortality rate in the oblast for young people, and among the highest mortality rates in all of Russia. In 2020, following a request for an inspection submitted by Open Russia member Pavel Chuprunov, Rosprirodnadzor placed the Karabashmed smelter under special monitoring and regional environmental prosecutors reported violations, including a failure to reduce emissions during adverse weather. The plant operator stated that the violations had been corrected.

== Culture ==
Video of the area from 2021

Karabash is prominently featured in the 2025 documentary film Mr Nobody Against Putin, portraying the effects of government propaganda and surveillance in one of the town's primary schools during the Russo-Ukrainian war.

== Notable people ==
- Pavel Talankin, documentary filmmaker
