= Ju Anqi =

- Born: 1975 (age 50–51); Urumqi, Xinjiang, China
- Occupations: Film director, multi-media artist

Ju Anqi (Chinese: 雎安奇; pinyin: Jū Ānqí, born 1975) is a Chinese film director and multi-media artist. Ju's film, Poet on a Business Trip (2015), made its world premiere at the 2015 International Film Festival Rotterdam and its Asian premiere at the 16th Jeonju International Film Festival, winning the NETPAC Award and the International Competition's grand prize, respectively. It also won Best Film (International Competition) at the 12th ZagrebDox International Documentary Film Festival in 2016.

== Personal life ==
Ju was born in Xinjiang, China, in 1975. Both his parents, originally from the southern China, were sent to Xinjiang as educated urban youth during the Cultural Revolution. In 1999, he graduated from the directing department of the Beijing Film Academy.

Ju said his "artistic enlightenment" were from the Japanese writer Kōbō Abe and French writer Albert Camus, and his works are "influenced by existentialism".

== Career ==
Ju's inspiration for his first film, There's a Strong Wind in Beijing, comes from Beijing where he lives. Shot on film that had been expired for 8 years, it made its premiere at the 50th Berlin International Film Festival in 2000.

Poet on a Business Trip (2015) was filmed in 2002 on a 40-day trip across Xinjiang with just him (as director) and one actor (Poet Shu). Due to a decade-long dispute with Shu, he started editing the material only in 2013 and completed it in 2014. Originally shot in color with a borrowed DV camera, he decided to make it black and white as it represents memory.

== Filmography ==
- There's a Strong Wind in Beijing 北京的风很大 (documentary, 2000)
- Quilts (documentary, 2003)
- Night in China (documentary, 2006)
- Happy Birthday! Mr. An (2007)
- Peking Duck (2008)
- Gipsy in the Flower 采花大道 (2008)
- Loser and Mao (2013, short film)
- Paris Party 巴黎派对 (2014)
- Poet on a Business Trip 诗人出差了 (2015)
- Drill Man 钻的人 (2016)
