= Dream Empire =

2016 American documentary film

Dream Empire is a 2016 American documentary film directed by David Borenstein. Its plot revolves around the director's experience as a foreign performer (known as "white monkey") in the booming real estate of Chongqing, the mega city in Southwest China, where foreigners are used as part of staging for real estate sales. The film is supported by Danish Film Institute and Sundance Institute.

== Awards ==
The film won the top award on the 19th Thessaloniki Documentary Festival.
