= Irena Škorić =

Croatian film director and screenwriter (born 1981)

- Born: 1981 (age 44–45); Zagreb, SFR Yugoslavia
- Education: Academy of Dramatic Art, University of Zagreb
- Occupations: Film director, film producer, writer
- Years active: 1998–present
- Website: www.irenaskoric.com

Irena Škorić (born 1981) is a Croatian film director and screenwriter. Her first feature film was erotic drama 7 seX 7, released in 2011. She was the president of Croatian Film Directors Guild from October 2014 to February 2015.

== Filmography ==
Year	Film	Original title	Functioned as			Notes
Year	Film	Original title	Director	Writer	Producer	Notes
2003	The Glamour and Misery of Kuma Batinusa	Sjaj i bijeda Kume Batinuše	Yes	Yes	No	Documentary film
2004	Fisherman's Tale	Ribanje	Yes	Yes	No	Documentary film
2004	Happiness	Sreća	Yes	Yes	No	Short film
2005	Fire, Water, Flour	Vatra, voda, brašno	Yes	Yes	No	Documentary film
2006	Trace of My Hands	Mojih ruku trag	Yes	Yes	No	Documentary film
2007	F. Y.	P. M.	Yes	Yes	No	Documentary film
2007	You Scratch My Back, I'll Scratch Yours	Ti meni, ja tebi	Yes	Yes	No	Documentary film
2008	Under Surveillance	Pod nadzorom	Yes	Yes	No	Short film
2008	Farewell	Rastanak	Yes	Yes	No	Short film
2010	March 9th	9. ožujak	Yes	Yes	No	Short film
2010	Demon from Kragujevac	Demon iz Kragujevca	Yes	Yes	No	Short film
2010	The Destiny of Line 13	Sudbina broja 13	Yes	Yes	Yes	Documentary film
2010	Berislav S. The Trial	Berislav Š. Proces	Yes	Yes	Yes	Documentary film
2010	Screenplay for Ordinary Life	Scenarij za običan život	Yes	Yes	Yes	Short film
2011	Farewell 2	Rastanak 2	Yes	Yes	Yes	Short film
2011	7 seX 7	7 seX 7	Yes	Yes	Yes	
2013	I love YU	I love YU	Yes	Yes	Yes	Short film
2014	Dear Lastan!	Dragi Lastane!	Yes	Yes	Yes	Documentary film
2014	Midnight Gray	Ponoćno sivo	No	No	Yes	
2014	The Bridge at the End of the World	Most na kraju svijeta	No	No	Yes	
2016	Unwanted Heritage	Neželjena baština	Yes	Yes	Yes	Documentary film
2024	Cat's Cry	Mačji krik	No	No	Yes	Feature film
