= Mr Nobody Against Putin =

2025 documentary film by David Borenstein and Pavel Talankin

- International promotional release poster
- Directed by: David Borenstein; Pavel Talankin
- Written by: David Borenstein
- Produced by: Helle Faber; Radovan Síbrt; Alžběta Karásková; David Borenstein
- Starring: Pavel Talankin
- Narrated by: Pavel Talankin
- Cinematography: Pavel Talankin
- Edited by: Nicolaj Monberg; Rebekka Lønqvist
- Music by: Michal Rataj; Jonas Struck
- Production companies: Made in Copenhagen; Produced by PINK; ZDF/Arte
- Release dates: 25 January 2025 (Sundance); 22 March 2025 (Denmark)
- Running time: 90 minutes
- Countries: Denmark; Czech Republic; Germany
- Languages: Russian; English
- Box office: $1 million

Mr Nobody Against Putin is a 2025 documentary film directed by David Borenstein and co-directed by Pavel Talankin. It follows Talankin in his job at a school in Karabash, a poor mining town near the Ural Mountains. While recording his students, Talankin also documents the Putin administration's moves to control public perception during the ongoing Russo-Ukrainian war.

The film had its world premiere at the World Cinema Documentary section of the 2025 Sundance Film Festival on 25 January, where it won the Special Jury Award. It was selected as the Danish Oscar entry for Best International Feature Film, and went on to win Best Documentary at the 79th British Academy Film Awards and Best Documentary Feature Film at the 98th Academy Awards. Reception was generally positive, but there were concerns – especially by Ukrainian viewers – about the way the film portrayed opposition to Putin within Russia. The film was also criticized for its use of covert footage, particularly of children, obtained without informed consent.

== Background ==
Mr Nobody Against Putin was shot over a period of two years by Pavel "Pasha" Talankin, the videographer and events coordinator at Karabash Primary School #1 in Chelyabinsk Oblast. Talankin began seriously documenting his activities after the 2022 Russian invasion of Ukraine, when the government began requiring schools to hold regular "patriotic displays" and use state-written curriculum (such as Conversations about Important Things) to justify the invasion to students. At the same time, the government instituted a requirement to upload footage of these displays to a state-run portal to prove compliance, allowing Talankin cover to film meetings, lessons, and visitors to the school without attracting suspicion. He initially planned to resign in order to avoid supporting the Russian government; however, after getting in contact with director David Borenstein, he withdrew his resignation to keep gathering footage.

On one occasion, mercenaries from the Wagner Group arrive at the school to give a lecture; on another, Talankin disrupts the flag-raising ceremony by playing the US national anthem "The Star-Spangled Banner" performed by Lady Gaga instead of the Russian anthem. In parallel, the people surrounding Talankin are revealed — his mother, who works as a librarian at the same school; Pavel Abdulmanov, a pro-Putin history teacher; a student named Masha, whose brother fights and later dies in the war; and former students who are drafted into the army.

Talankin secretly fled Russia during the summer of 2024, aided by his producers and Borenstein who worked to get him asylum in Europe, following evidence of police surveillance at his home, which appears in the film.

== Production ==
Mr Nobody Against Putin was directed by David Borenstein and Pavel Talankin. The co-production partners are ZDF/Arte and the BBC, with additional support from the Danish Film Institute and the Czech Audiovisual Fund. The film was produced by Borenstein, Helle Faber for 'Made in Copenhagen' (Denmark), Radovan Síbrt, and Alžběta Karásková for PINK (Czech Republic). Post-production was done by Prague's UPP studio.

Lucie Kon is the BBC's commissioning editor and an executive producer, who oversaw the project and was crucial in providing the initial funding from the BBC. She also advised on the critical safety and security protocols required to get the sensitive undercover footage out of Russia. She facilitated the collaboration between the filmmakers and various international partners.

== Release and reception ==
Mr Nobody Against Putin premiered at the Sundance Film Festival in January 2025. Beginning in March 2025, it has been screened at numerous film festivals around the world. The film premiered in Florida on 29 March 2025 at the 18th Gasparilla International Film Festival in Tampa. In the United Kingdom, Mr Nobody first aired on BBC Four on 14 October 2025, as part of the Storyville strand: Kino Lorber acquired North American rights in January 2026, setting a release date for January 22 in select theaters and streaming on the Kino Film Collection.

The film's production process became the subject of public debate, particularly regarding ethical considerations. Because much of the footage was recorded covertly in a Russian school, critics raised concerns that students and colleagues were filmed without informed consent, including minors who could not meaningfully agree to participate. Some observers questioned whether the use of such material exposed participants to potential risks, especially given the political sensitivity of the subject matter.

These concerns were echoed in media discussions and among Russian-speaking audiences abroad. According to Meduza, the documentary prompted disagreement within the emigre community, where some viewers praised the filmmaker's actions as courageous, while others criticized the project's ethics and questioned the author's motivations, describing him as potentially seeking recognition rather than solely documenting events. Some have argued that the film filters events in Russia through a distinctly Western lens, shaped for the documentary circuit. Additionally, others have pointed out that certain moments appear staged or overblown, presenting Talankin as a heroic figure fighting against the odds.

More broadly, coverage in international media highlighted the inherent tension between the film's investigative value and the ethical risks of undercover filming in a school environment, with the project described as raising difficult questions about the boundaries of documentary practice under authoritarian conditions.

=== Critical response ===
On the review aggregator website Rotten Tomatoes, 100% of 53 critics' reviews are positive, with an average rating of 8.0/10. The website's consensus reads: "Chronicling one whistleblower's uphill struggle with clear-eyed insight, Mr Nobody Against Putin is a powerful documentary that vividly illustrates the resilience of everyday people against institutional forces." Metacritic, which uses a weighted average, assigned the film a score of 80 out of 100, based on 13 critics, indicating "generally favorable" reviews.

IndieWire published a positive review, giving the film a grade of "A-" and praising the documentary for its undercover footage of life inside Russia. The Guardian was similarly positive and praised Talankin for his bravery in capturing footage. The Daily Beast and Variety also published positive reviews. The A.V. Club was more critical, noting that the film's focus on a single school made it feel limited in scope and that several narrative threads were dropped as the film continued. Owen Matthews, writing for The Independent, was also critical, stating that the Russian government did not take as much offence to token acts of protest as Mr Nobody appears to portray, while also noting that the film shows more of the widespread political apathy and compliance that contributes to Putin's totalitarian rule than defiance – a problem raised by many Ukrainian viewers.

=== Russian government response ===
In February 2026, Dmitry Peskov, Russian Presidential Press Secretary, told journalists that the Kremlin had not watched the work and that "it would be wrong to give any assessments without being familiar with the material".

In March, the Russian Presidential Council for Civil Society and Human Rights appealed to the Academy of Motion Picture Arts and Sciences and UNESCO Secretary General Khaled Al-Anani regarding Mr. Nobody Against Putin. The council claimed that the film may violate the rights of minors because it includes footage of schoolchildren used without parental consent, and asked the Academy to review whether the film complies with child-protection standards.

In the same month, a court in Chelyabinsk banned the documentary Mr Nobody Against Putin from being distributed in Russia. The charges cited the appearance of the white-blue-white flag, considered a symbol of the Freedom of Russia Legion, as "propaganda of extremism and terrorism". Prosecutors also claimed the film promotes "militarization", expresses a "negative attitude toward the war and the current government", and shows minors without parental consent.

=== Awards and nominations ===
Award / Film Festival	Year	Category	Recipient(s)	Result	Ref.
Academy Awards	2026	Best Documentary Feature	David Borenstein, Pavel Talankin, Helle Faber, and Alžběta Karásková	Won	
British Academy Film Awards	2026	Best Documentary	David Borenstein, Pavel Talankin, Helle Faber, and Alžběta Karásková	Won	
Robert Awards	2026	Best Editing	Nicolaj Monberg and Rebekka Lønqvist	Nominated	
Robert Awards	2026	Best Documentary Feature	Helle Faber, David Borenstein, and Pavel Talankin	Won	
Sundance Film Festival	2025	World Cinema Documentary Special Jury Award	Mr Nobody Against Putin	Won	
Ann Arbor Film Festival	2025	International Documentary Audience Award	Mr Nobody Against Putin	Won	

== See also ==
- Conversations about Important Things
- List of submissions to the 98th Academy Awards for Best International Feature Film
- List of Danish submissions for the Academy Award for Best International Feature Film
- List of Russian Academy Award winners and nominees
