= Pavel Talankin =

Russian teacher and documentary filmmaker (born 1991)

- Павел Таланкин
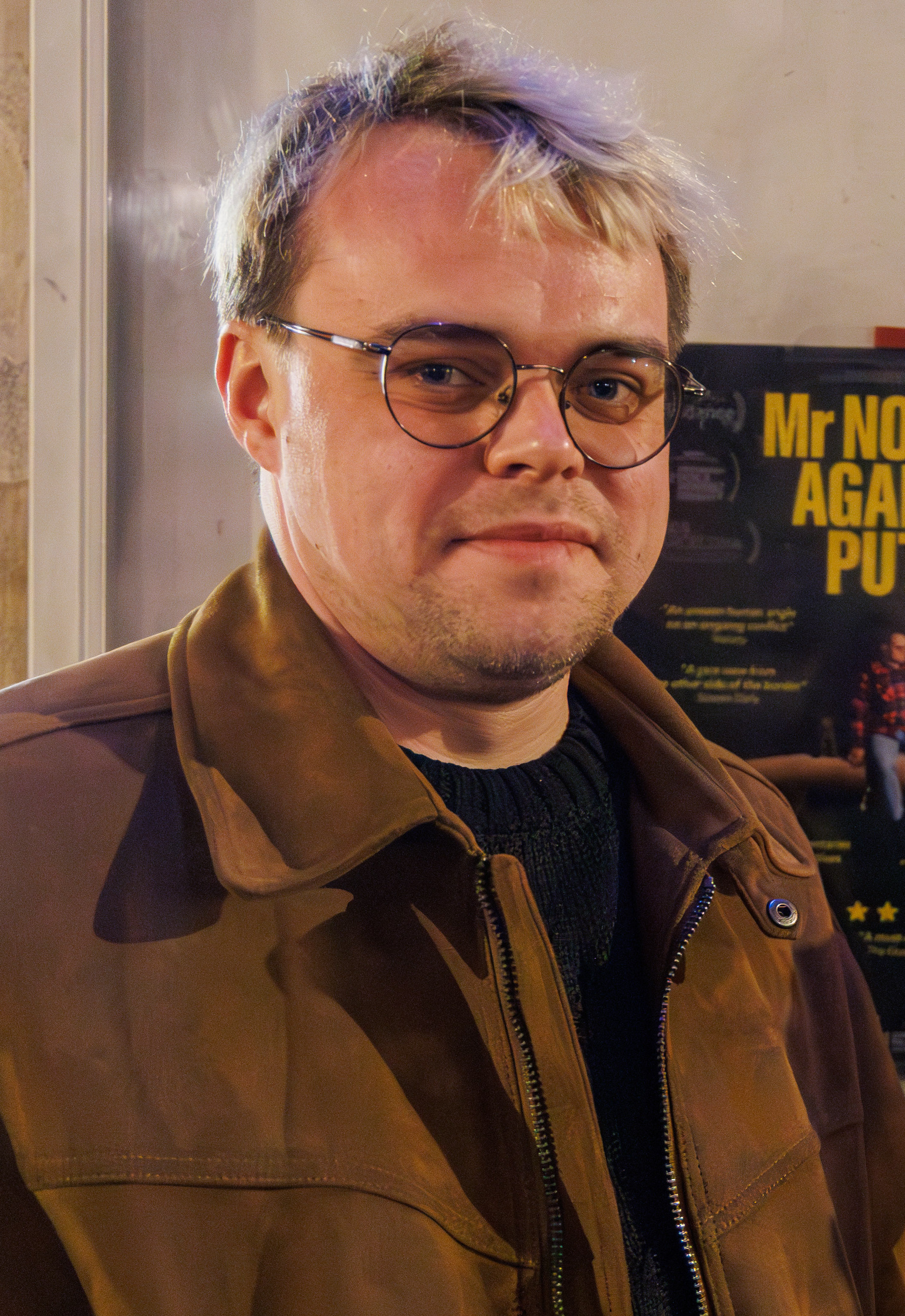
- Talankin at ArtDocFest Paris in 2025
- Born: March 11, 1991 (age 35); Karabash, Chelyabinsk Oblast, Soviet Union
- Occupations: Teacher; documentary filmmaker; cinematographer; videographer
- Years active: 2022–present
- Notable work: Mr. Nobody Against Putin (2025)
- Awards: BAFTA Film Award (Documentary) for Mr. Nobody Against Putin 98th Academy Awards Documentary Feature Film for Mr. Nobody Against Putin '

Pavel Talankin (Russian: Павел Ильич Таланкин; born 11 March 1991) is a Russian teacher and documentary filmmaker who worked as a teacher-organizer and school videographer at Karabash Primary School No. 1 in Karabash, Chelyabinsk Oblast, Russia. He is credited as co-director, cinematographer, and narrator of the anti-war opposition documentary feature Mr Nobody Against Putin (2025).

Mr. Nobody Against Putin premiered in the World Cinema Documentary program at the 2025 Sundance Film Festival and received the World Cinema Documentary Special Jury Award. The film won the BAFTA Award for Best Documentary and the Academy Award for Best Documentary Feature at the 98th Academy Awards. Talankin left Russia in 2024 and emigrated to Prague (Czech Republic).

== Early life and education ==
Talankin grew up in Karabash, an industrial town in Chelyabinsk Oblast. He attended Karabash Primary School No. 1 as a child and later returned to work there. His mother worked at the same school as a librarian.

Published accounts describe Talankin as working with children since his student years, including at the Orlyonok camp near Lake Uvildy and later in a children’s home and a library in Karabash.

== Career ==
At Karabash Primary School No. 1, Talankin organized extracurricular activities and filmed school events such as assemblies and ceremonies as part of his job as the school videographer. He taught children practical video production skills, including shooting and editing. In public reporting, Talankin’s pre-film community work in Karabash included activities with students connected to media and youth programming, including a 2021 project building a detailed Minecraft model of Karabash with students.

Talankin collaborated with filmmaker David Borenstein on Mr. Nobody Against Putin using footage recorded inside his school over a two-year period following Russia’s 2022 invasion of Ukraine, and he left Russia in June 2024 carrying recorded material on seven hard drives. The Sundance film listing credits Talankin as co-director and cinematographer and identifies the film as a Denmark/Czech Republic production with a 90-minute runtime in Russian. International festival programs in Bulgaria, Serbia, and Hungary scheduled screenings of the film, listing Talankin as co-director and identifying him as a teacher associated with the school where the film was shot. The film won the Academy Award for Best Documentary Feature Film at the 2026 Oscars.

== Style and themes ==
Talankin’s credited filmmaking work centers on first-person documentary narration and observational footage recorded within a Russian primary school setting in which he worked officially as a videographer. Reviews have described the film’s approach as combining on-the-ground school footage with diary-like narration to depict the integration of ideological messaging into everyday school routines.

== Reception ==
Coverage of Talankin in Russian-language reporting has emphasized his former role inside Karabash Primary School No. 1 and the risks associated with removing filmed school material from Russia after the start of the full scale invasion in 2022. Reviews in European and North American outlets discussed Talankin’s footage as a rare inside-school record of how war-related messaging and rituals appeared in day-to-day educational life during the period when he was filming.

== At the 98th Academy Awards ==
The documentary is based on footage from a school in the city of Karabash, showing the process of ideological indoctrination of children. The film Mr. Nobody Against Putin became a sensation and caused a mixed reaction in Russia. When presented with the award, Talankin made a call to stop wars, mentioning children.

== Legal issues in Russia ==
A Chelyabinsk court banned the documentary from streaming platforms – VK Video, Yandex, and Motion Video – on the grounds that it "propagates extremism and terrorism." The court cited the use of the White-blue-white flag and associated it with the Freedom of Russia Legion.

On March 27, 2026 the Russian Ministry of Justice added Talankin to its list of foreign agents.

== See also ==
- List of Russian Academy Award winners and nominees
