= David Borenstein =

American filmmaker

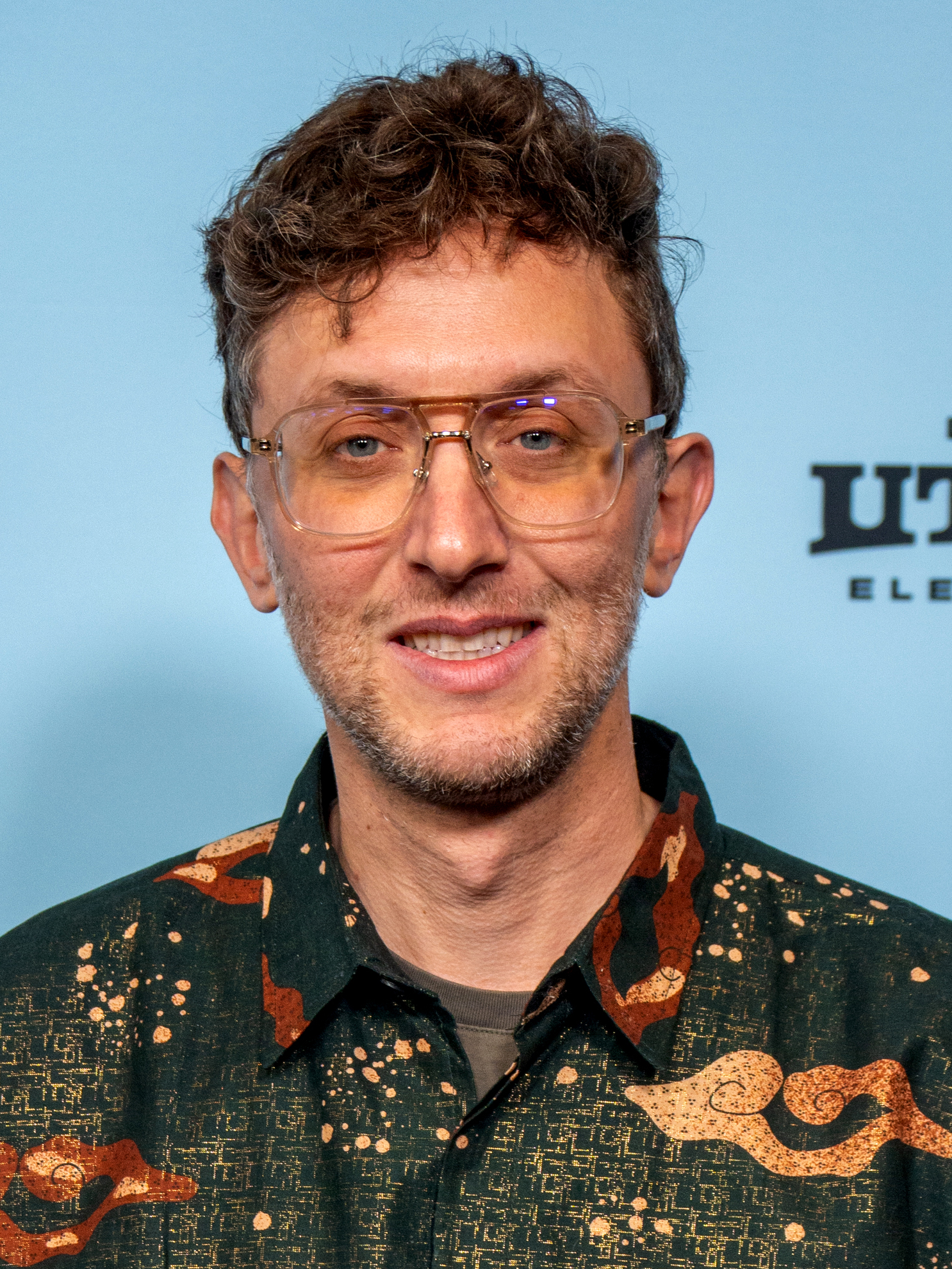
- Borenstein at the 2025 Sundance Film Festival
- Born: 1984 (age 41–42); Miami, Florida, U.S.
- Education: University of Florida (BA)
- Occupation: Documentary filmmaker
- Known for: Mr Nobody Against Putin
- Awards: Academy Award for Best Documentary Feature Film (2026); BAFTA Award for Best Documentary (2026)
- Website: www.davidborenstein.com

David Borenstein (born 1984) is an American documentary filmmaker. He is known for Mr Nobody Against Putin (2025), for which he won the Academy Award for Best Documentary Feature Film as co-director.

== Education ==
Borenstein was born in 1984. He graduated from the University of Florida in 2009 with degrees in Chinese and political science. He then received a Fulbright U.S. Student Scholarship to China.

== Career ==
Borenstein began his career in radio broadcasting and directed his first feature film, Dream Empire, in 2016. He spent ten years in China working on the film, shooting documentaries about the fringes of Chinese society. For this work, he received several nominations and won the Golden Alexander for Best Documentary at the Thessaloniki International Film Festival.

He is the co-director of the documentary Mr Nobody Against Putin, released in 2025.

The Danish Film Institute described his film Can't Feel Nothing as one that "constructs a tapestry of human stories across four continents, depicting a world where our emotions are commodified and instrumentalized with ruthless efficiency."

Borenstein has argued that propaganda operates not only through state media but also through institutions such as schools. Critics have noted that Mr. Nobody Against Putin depicts how authoritarian structures take hold in everyday life.

In addition to his feature films, Borenstein directs and produces broadcast documentaries for public broadcasters including PBS, notably for the series NOVA, and for BBC World Service. For NOVA's Decoding COVID-19, he filmed inside Wuhan during the early stages of the pandemic; the production later received a duPont–Columbia Award. For NOVA's Inside China's Tech Boom, he filmed inside Huawei's offices as the company responded to U.S. sanctions.

== Upcoming projects ==
Following the success of Mr. Nobody Against Putin, Borenstein is developing a new feature documentary titled Living in Our Heads, in collaboration with producer Helle Faber and the Danish company Made in Copenhagen. He intends to continue working with American public broadcaster PBS, particularly its science series NOVA.

== Activism ==
In his acceptance speech for the Academy Award for Mr. Nobody Against Putin, Borenstein drew parallels between Putin's Russia and Trump's America. Backstage, he told reporters that his Russian colleagues warned him the situation in America was "actually happening quicker" and that "Trump is moving a lot quicker than Putin in his early years."

In April 2026, Borenstein signed an open letter opposing the $110 Billion Warner Bros. Discovery and Paramount Skydance merger and joined a protest outside the company's New York headquarters. In an interview with NPR, he said that for filmmakers like him, "the house is already burning down" and urged continued opposition to the deal.

== Awards ==
=== For Dream Empire (2016) ===
- Golden Alexander for Best Documentary – Thessaloniki International Film Festival

=== For Mr Nobody Against Putin (2025) ===
- Special Jury Award – Sundance Film Festival (2025)
- BAFTA Award for Best Documentary (February 2026)
- Academy Award for Best Documentary Feature Film (98th Academy Awards, March 2026)

== Personal life ==
Borenstein lives and works in Copenhagen.

== Filmography ==
Year	Title	Notes	Ref.
2015	Rent-a-Foreigner in China	Short documentary; director, producer, writer	
2016	Dream Empire	Feature documentary; director, producer, writer	
2021	Love Factory	Short documentary; director, writer	
2024	Can't Feel Nothing	Feature documentary; director, writer	
2025	Mr. Nobody Against Putin	Feature documentary; co-director, producer, writer	
2026	Living in Our Heads	Feature documentary (in development); director	
