= 98th Academy Awards =

Award ceremony for 2025 films

- Official poster
- Date: March 15, 2026
- Site: Dolby Theatre, Hollywood, Los Angeles, California, U.S.
- Hosted by: Conan O'Brien
- Preshow hosts: Tamron Hall; Jesse Palmer
- Produced by: Raj Kapoor; Katy Mullan
- Directed by: Hamish Hamilton

Highlights
- Best Picture: One Battle After Another
- Most awards: One Battle After Another (6)
- Most nominations: Sinners (16)

TV in the United States
- Network: ABC; Hulu
- Duration: 3 hours, 40 minutes
- Ratings: 17.86 million 8.4% (Nielsen ratings)

The 98th Academy Awards ceremony, presented by the Academy of Motion Picture Arts and Sciences (AMPAS), took place on March 15, 2026, at the Dolby Theatre in Hollywood, Los Angeles. During the gala, the AMPAS presented Academy Awards (commonly referred to as Oscars) in 24 categories honoring films released in 2025. The ceremony, televised in the United States by ABC and streamed on Hulu, was produced by Raj Kapoor and Katy Mullan, and was directed by Hamish Hamilton. Comedian Conan O'Brien hosted the show for the second consecutive year.

In related events, the Academy held its 16th Governors Awards ceremony at the Ray Dolby Ballroom of the Ovation Hollywood complex in Hollywood on November 16, 2025. The Academy Scientific and Technical Awards were presented by host Sofia Carson on April 28, 2026, in a ceremony at the Academy Museum of Motion Pictures in Los Angeles.

One Battle After Another won the most awards with six, including Best Picture and the inaugural award for Best Casting. Sinners received a record sixteen nominations and won four awards. Other winners included Frankenstein with three; KPop Demon Hunters with two; and All the Empty Rooms, Avatar: Fire and Ash, F1, The Girl Who Cried Pearls, Hamnet, Mr Nobody Against Putin, Sentimental Value, The Singers, Two People Exchanging Saliva, and Weapons with one each. The telecast drew 17.86 million viewers in the United States.

== Winners and nominees ==
The nominees for the 98th Academy Awards were announced on January 22, 2026, at the Samuel Goldwyn Theater in Beverly Hills, by actress Danielle Brooks and actor Lewis Pullman. Sinners led with sixteen nominations, the most in Oscar history; One Battle After Another came in second with thirteen. The winners were announced during the awards ceremony on March 15.

Michael B. Jordan became the second actor to win an Oscar for a dual role after Lee Marvin for Cat Ballou (1965). At the age of 30, Timothée Chalamet became the youngest actor to earn three acting nominations since Marlon Brando, and also became the youngest person to be nominated for both acting and producing in the same year. The 40-year span between Amy Madigan's first nomination, for her supporting role in Twice in a Lifetime (1985), and her recent nomination for Weapons, set the record for the longest gap between Oscar nominations for an actress. With her fifth Best Costume Design nomination, Ruth E. Carter became the most-nominated Black woman in Oscar history across all categories. Best Cinematography winner Autumn Durald Arkapaw became the first female and Black winner in the category as well as the first Filipino winner; she was also the first woman of color to be nominated in the category. The joint win by The Singers and Two People Exchanging Saliva for Best Live Action Short Film marked the first occurrence of a tie since the 85th ceremony in 2013, and the seventh tie overall.

=== Awards ===
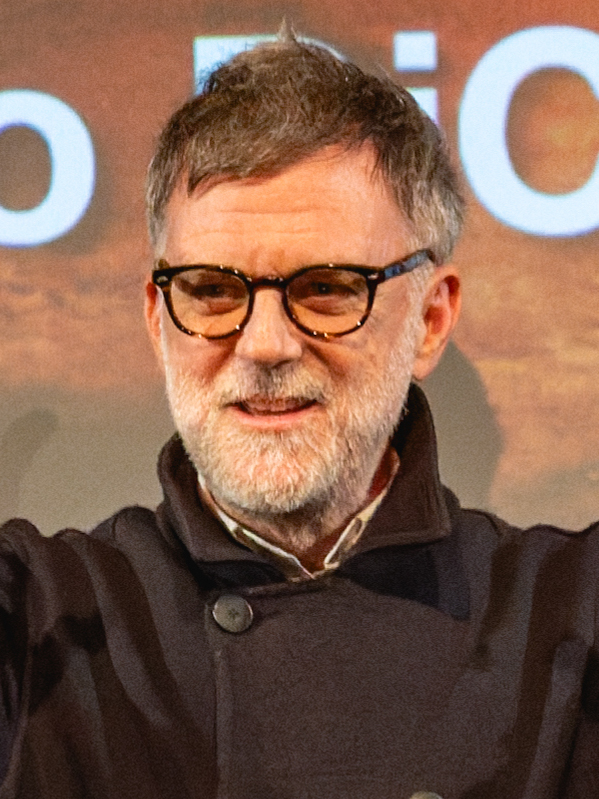
Paul Thomas Anderson, Best Picture co-winner, and Best Director and Best Adapted Screenplay winner

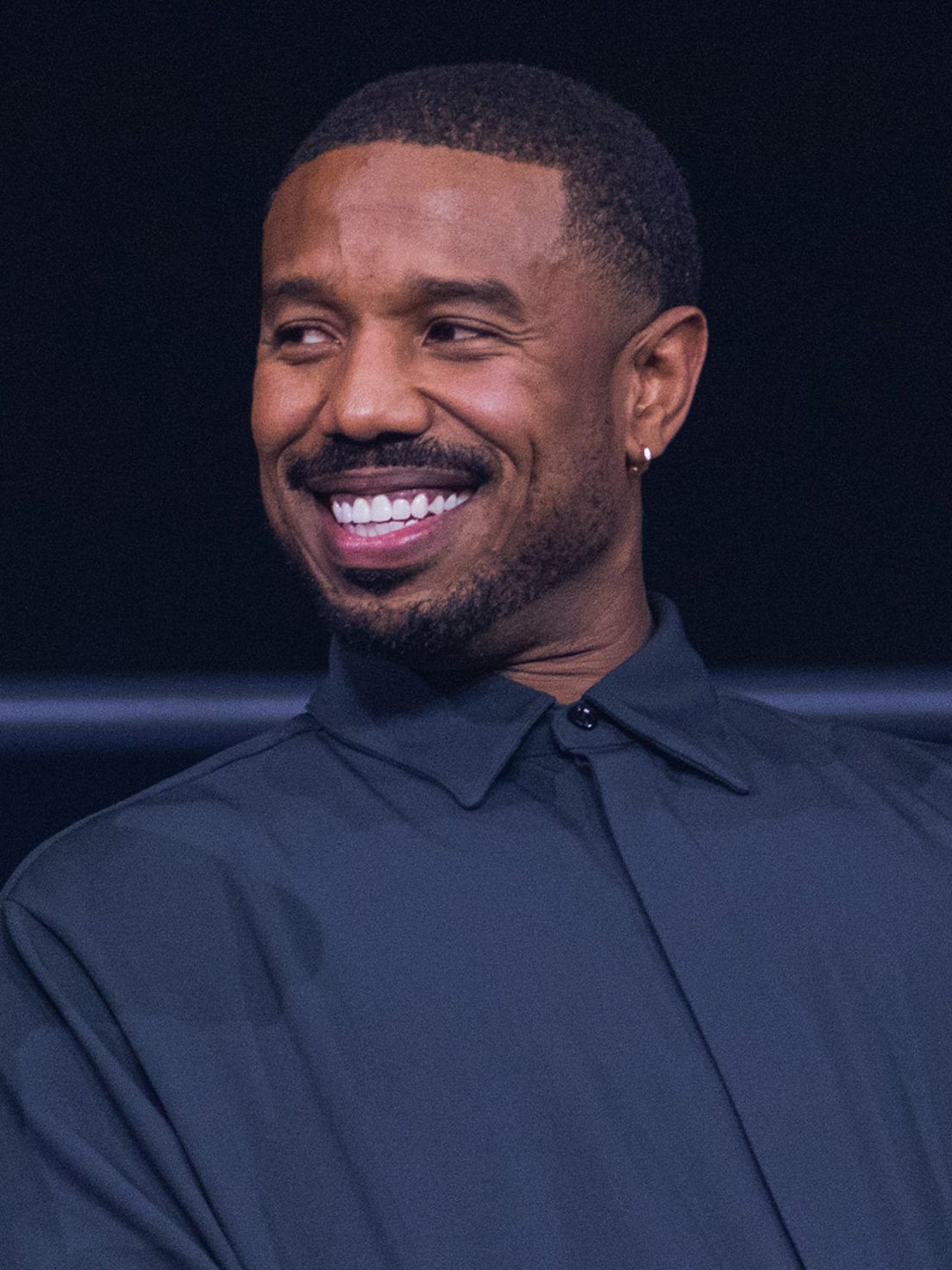
Michael B. Jordan, Best Actor winner

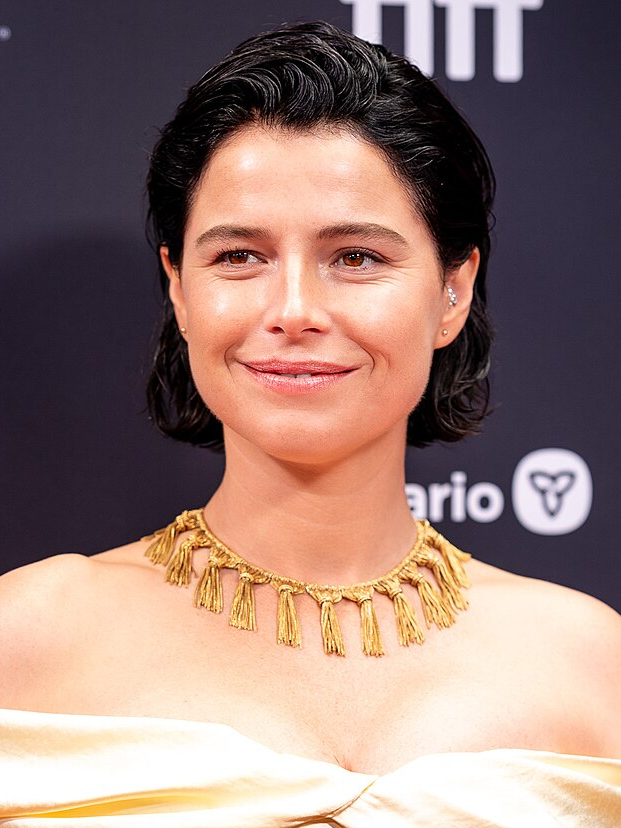
Jessie Buckley, Best Actress winner

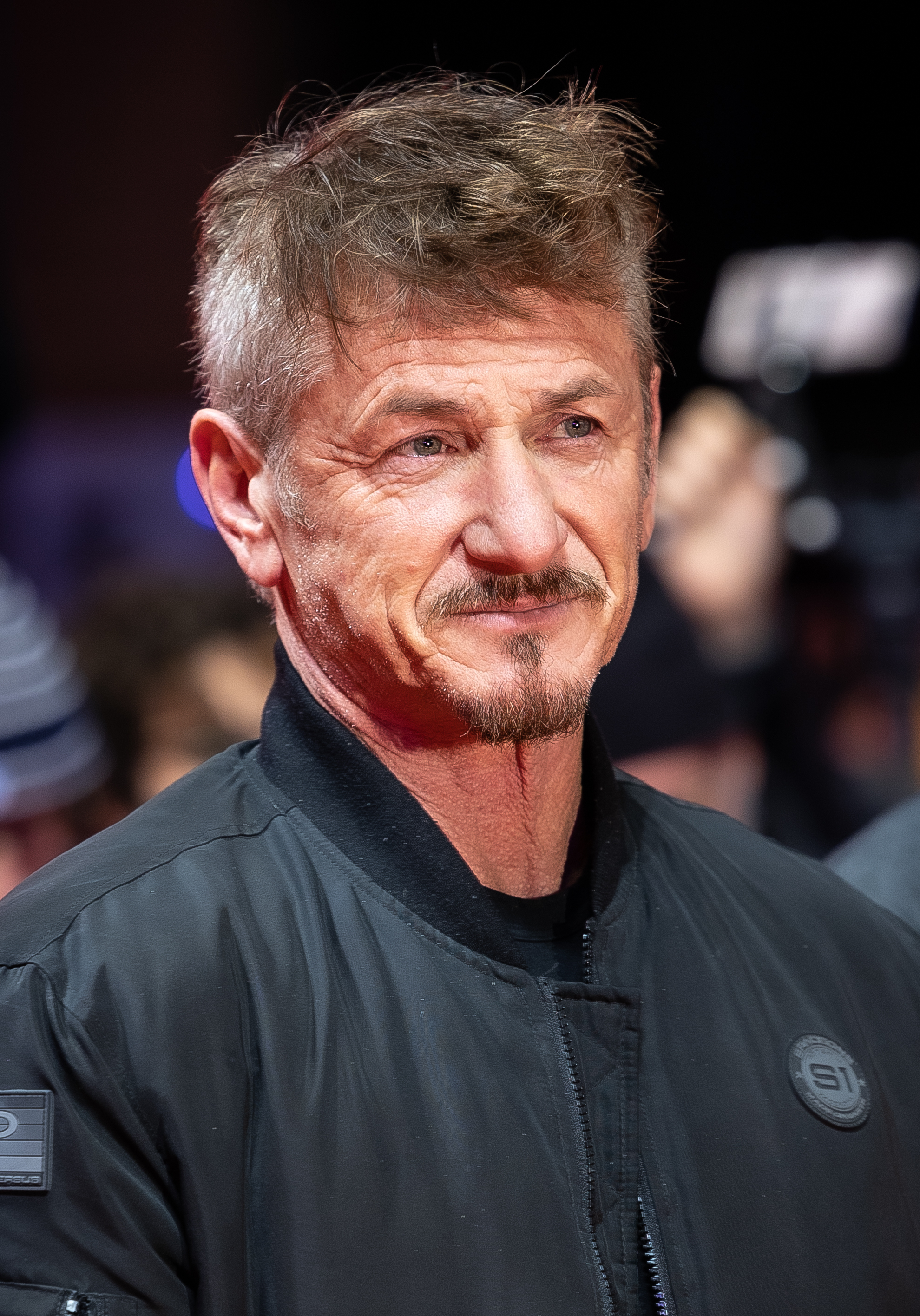
Sean Penn, Best Supporting Actor winner

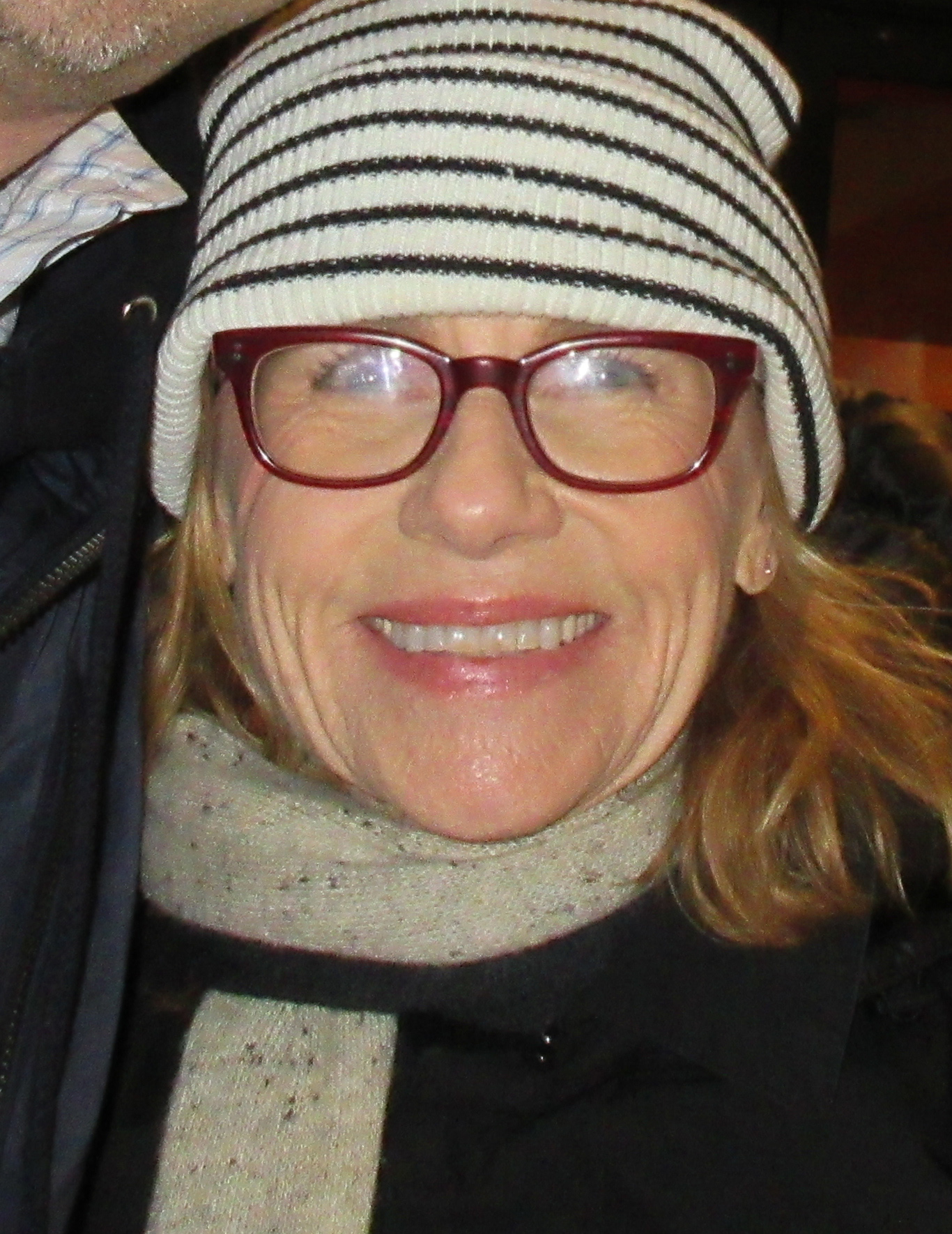
Amy Madigan, Best Supporting Actress winner

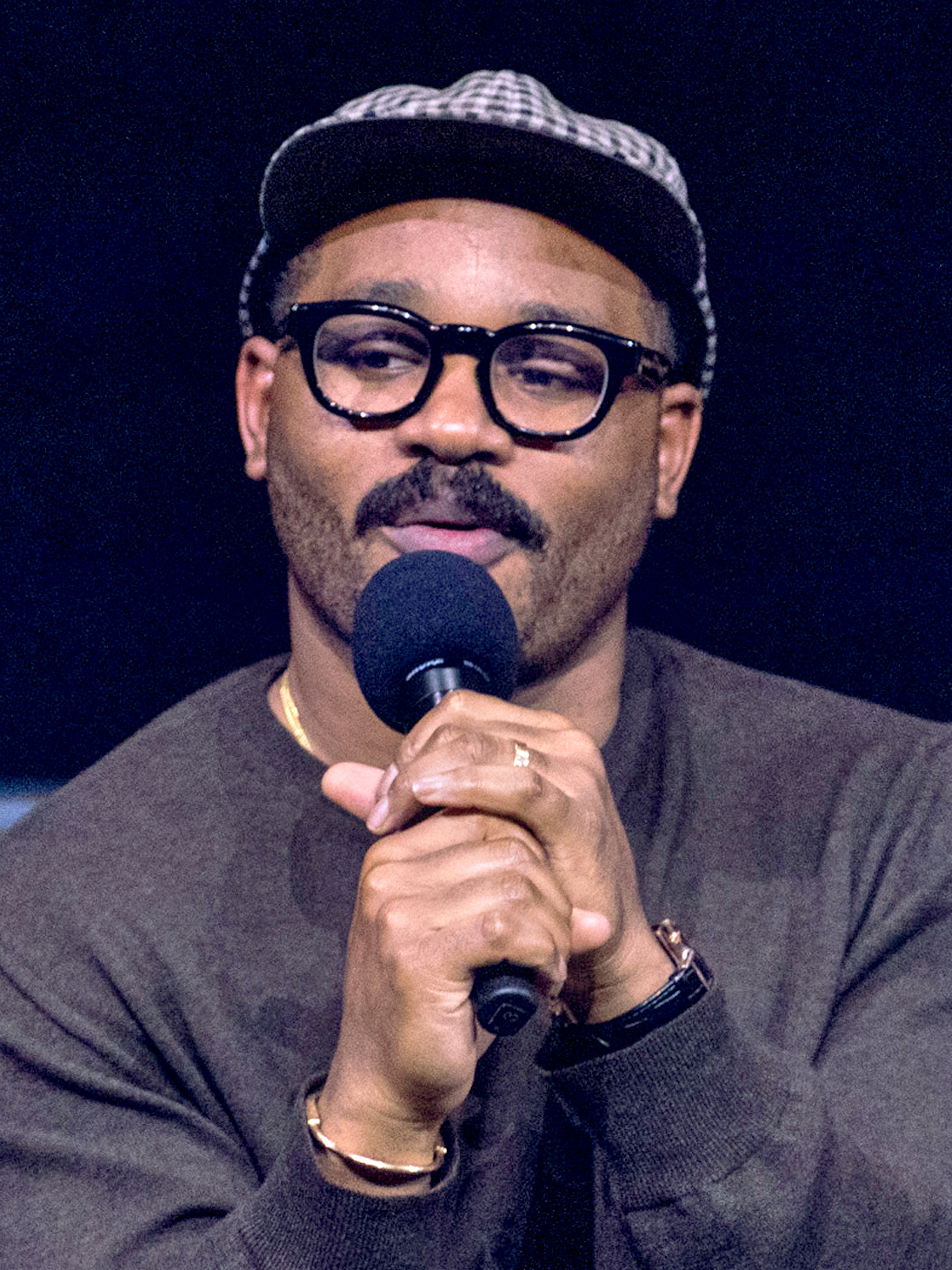
Ryan Coogler, Best Original Screenplay winner

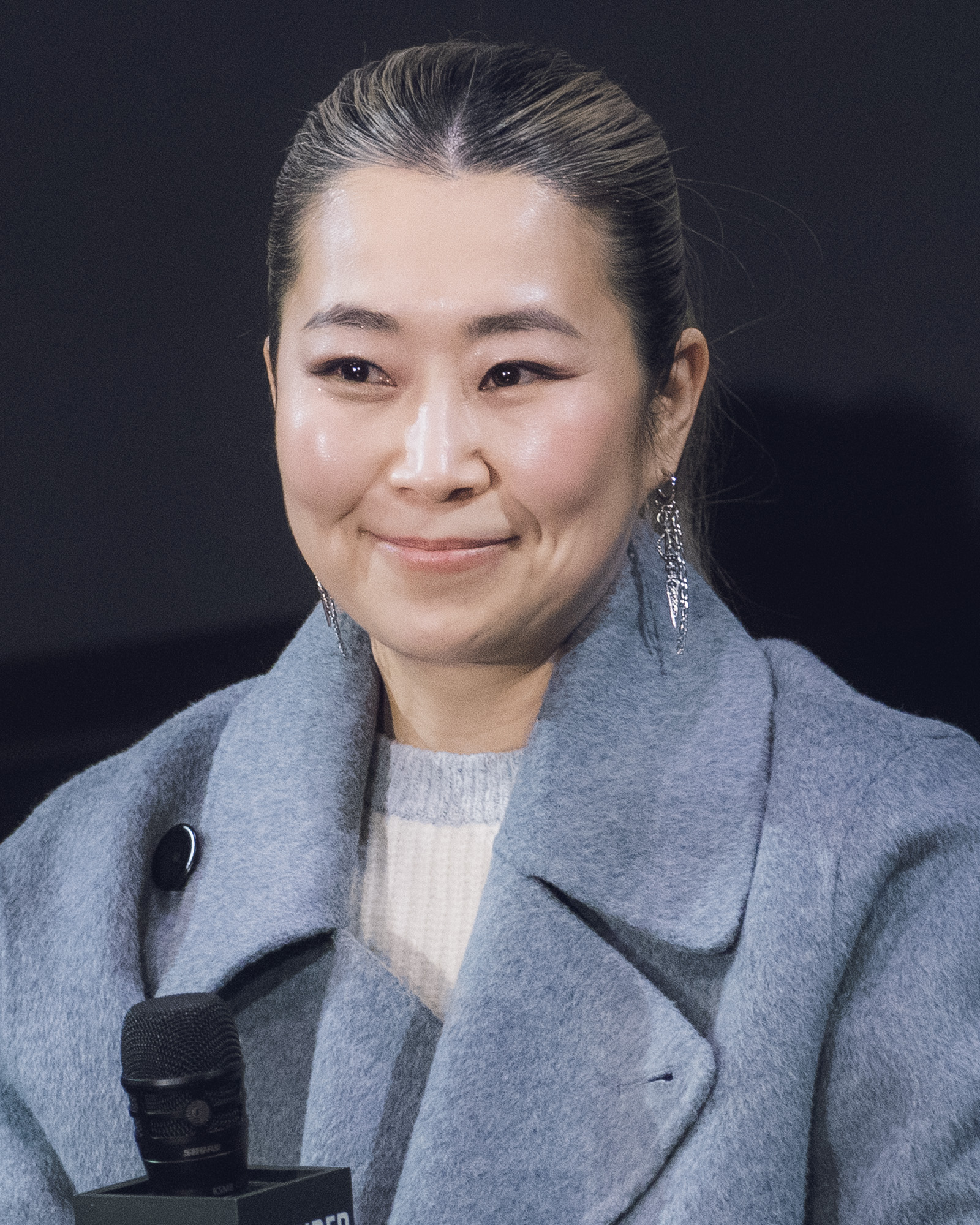
Maggie Kang, Best Animated Feature Film co-winner

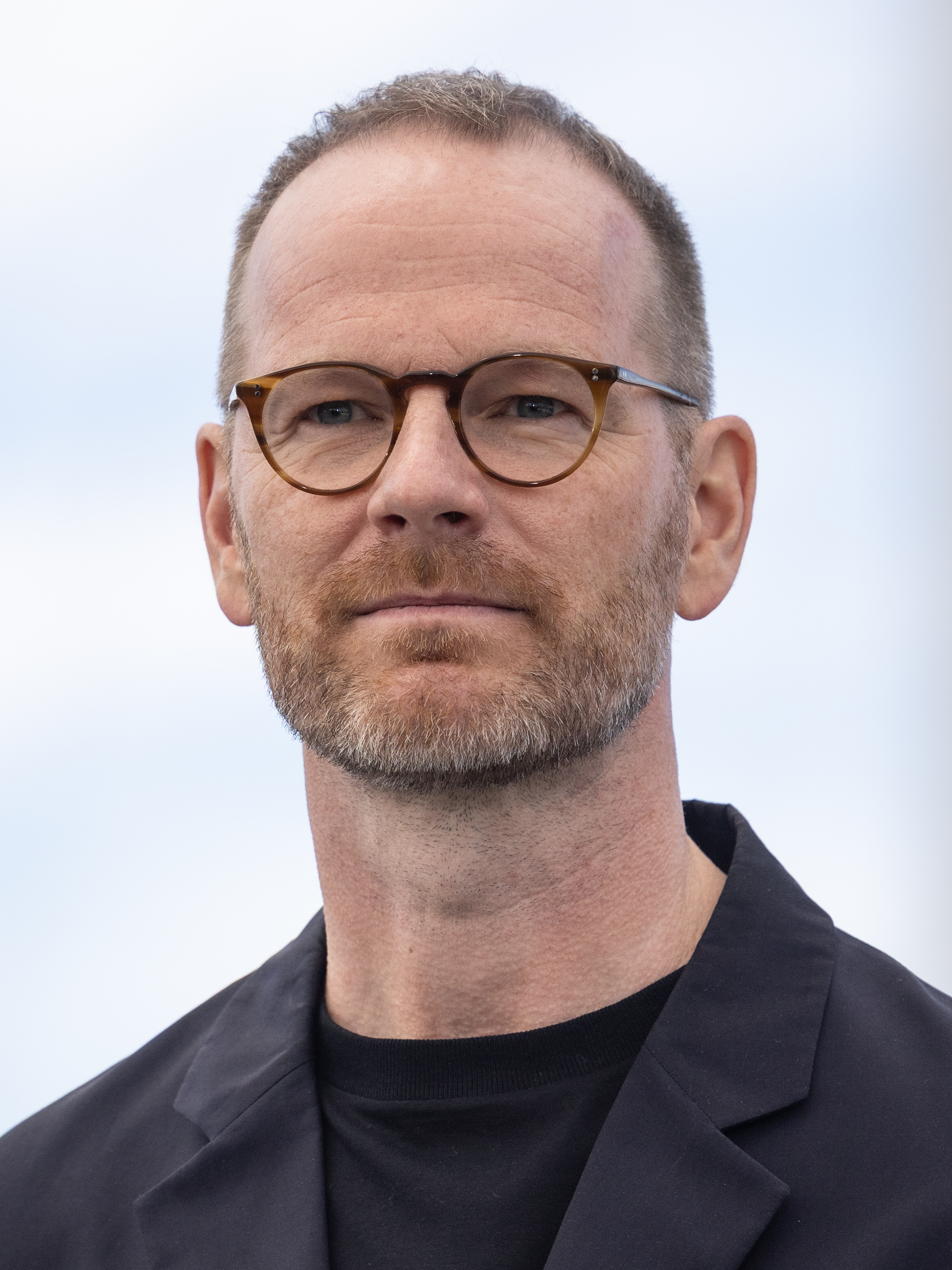
Joachim Trier, Best International Feature Film winner

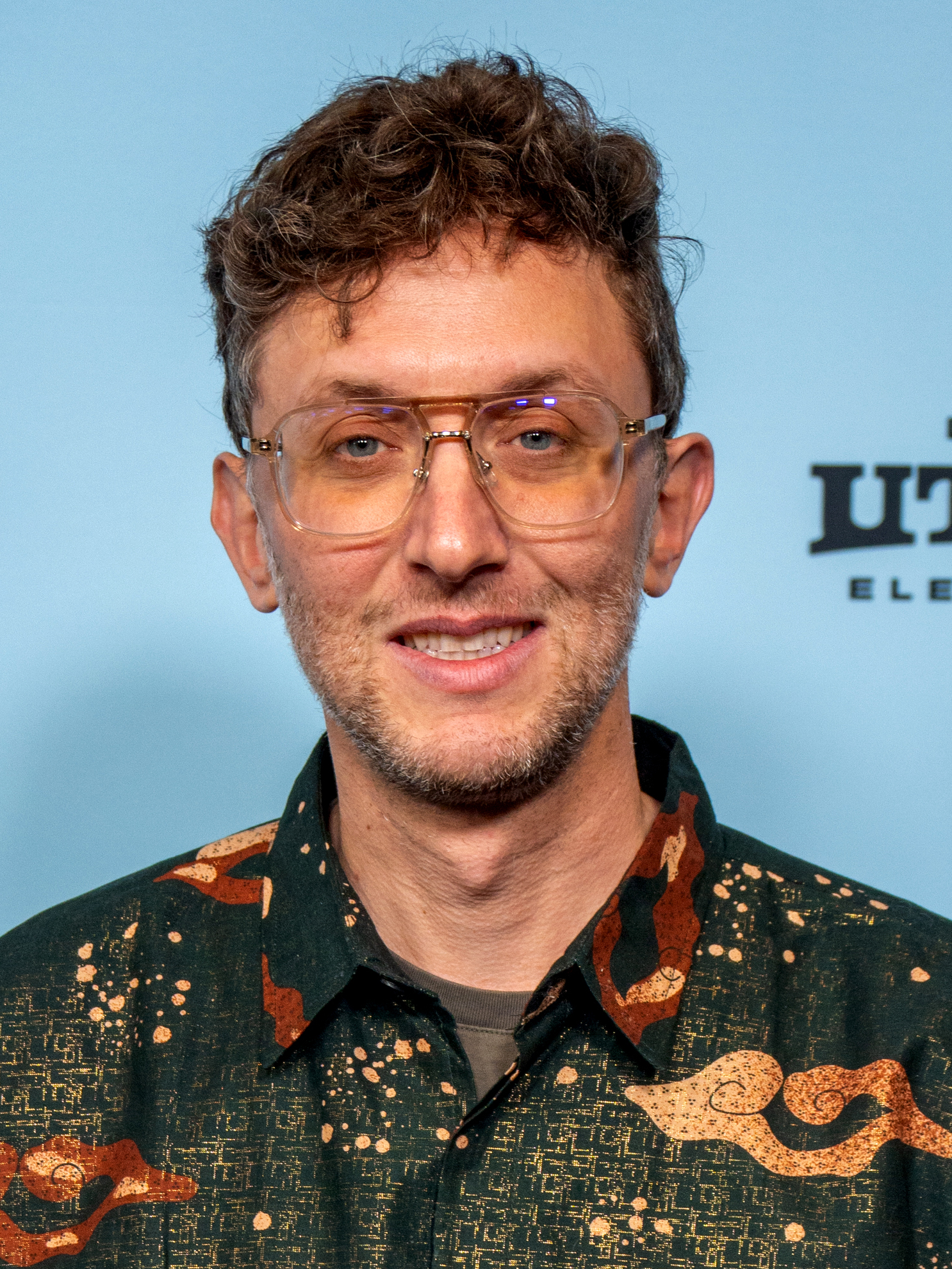
David Borenstein, Best Documentary Feature Film co-winner

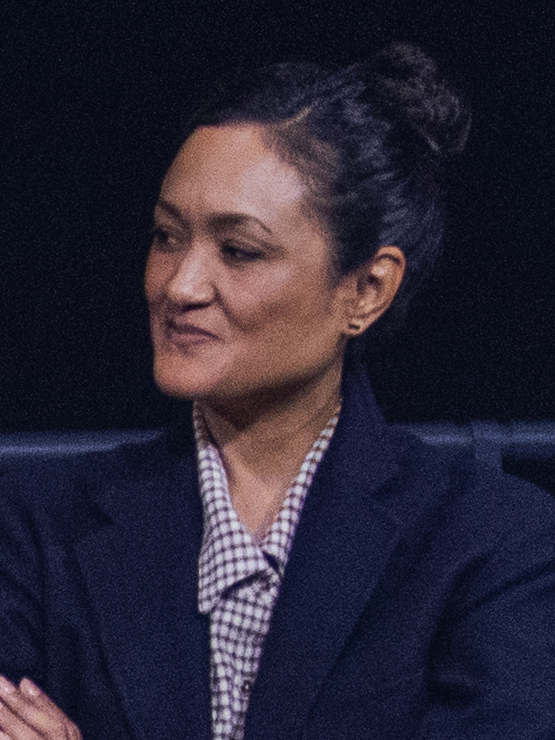
Autumn Durald Arkapaw, Best Cinematography winner

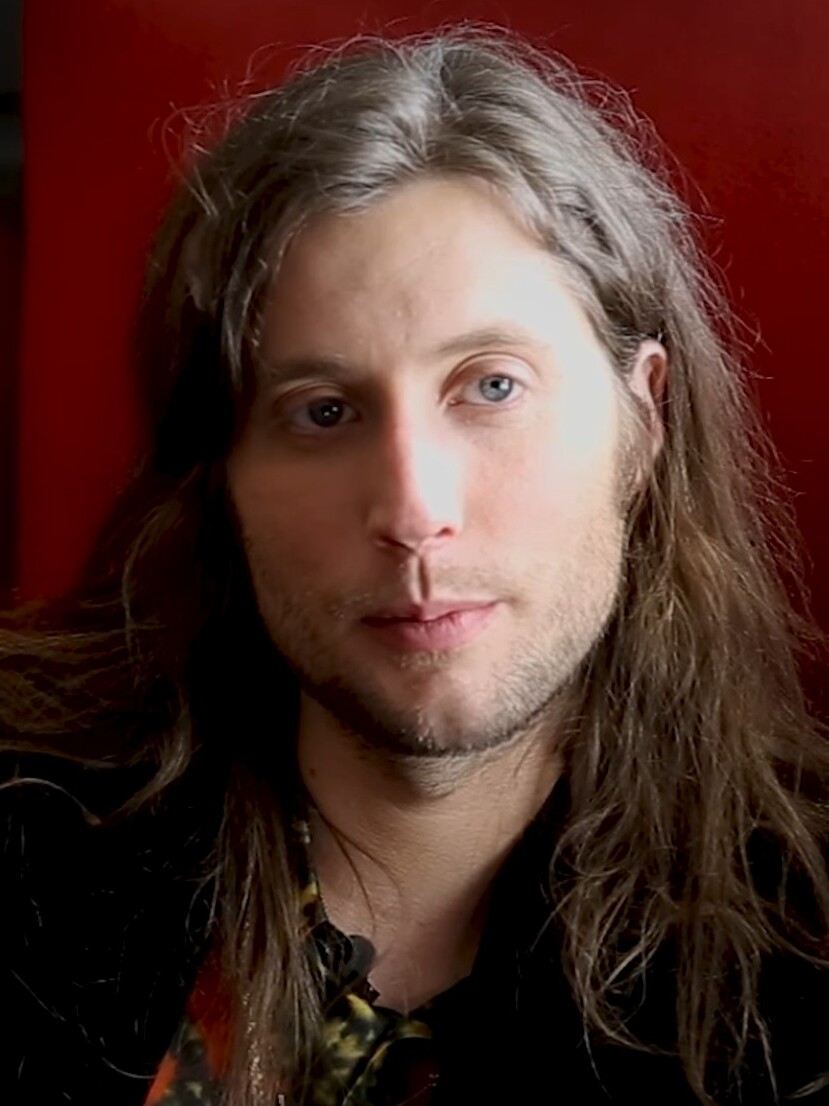
Ludwig Göransson, Best Original Score winner

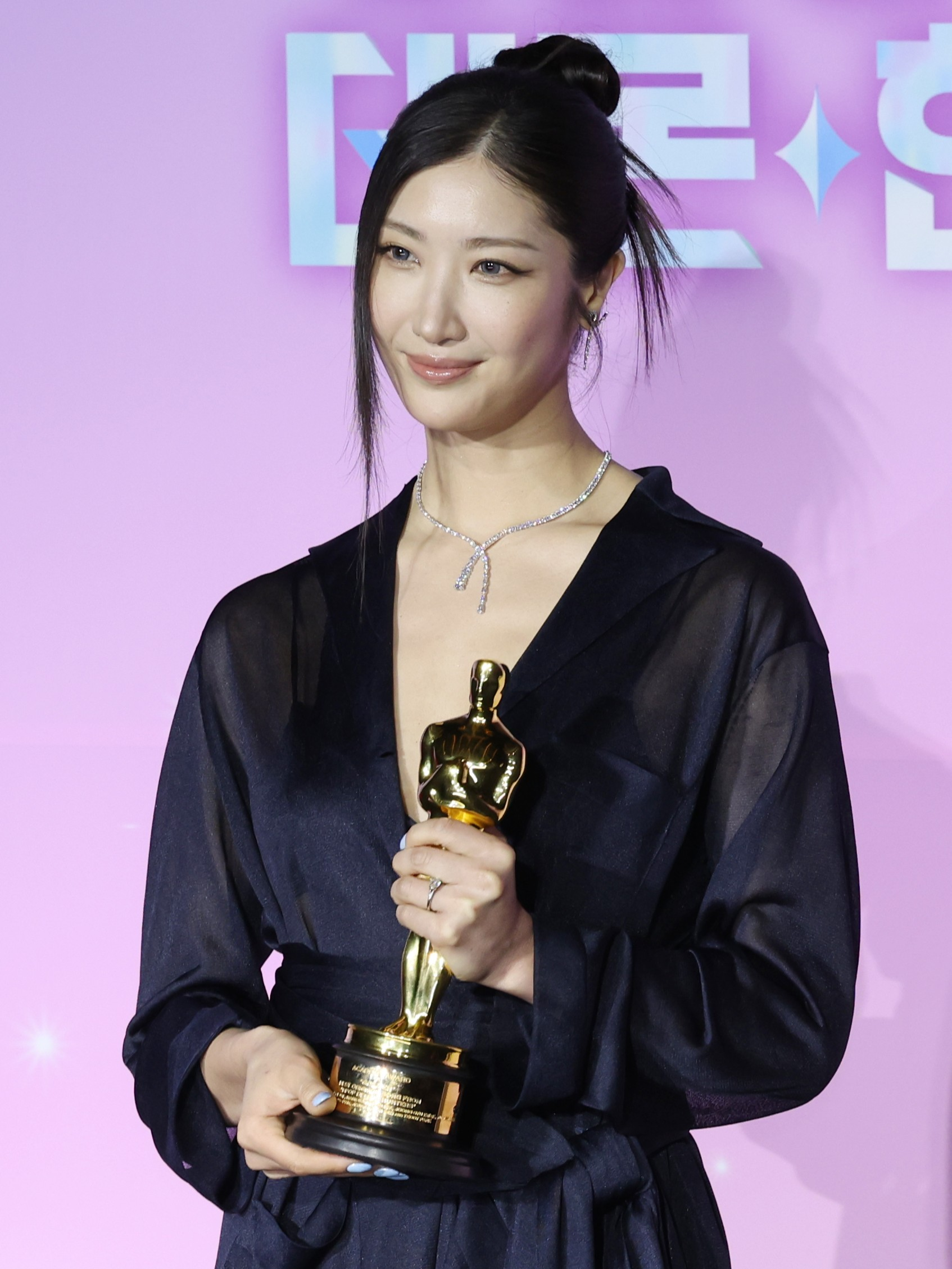
Ejae, Best Original Song co-winner

Winners are listed first, highlighted in boldface, and indicated with a double dagger (‡).

**Best Picture**: **One Battle After Another – Adam Somner (posth.), Sara Murphy, and Paul Thomas Anderson, producers ‡**; Bugonia – Ed Guiney, Andrew Lowe, Yorgos Lanthimos, Emma Stone, and Lars Knudsen, producers; F1 – Chad Oman, Brad Pitt, Dede Gardner, Jeremy Kleiner, Joseph Kosinski, and Jerry Bruckheimer, producers; Frankenstein – Guillermo del Toro, J. Miles Dale, and Scott Stuber, producers; Hamnet – Liza Marshall, Pippa Harris, Nicolas Gonda, Steven Spielberg, and Sam Mendes, producers; Marty Supreme – Eli Bush, Ronald Bronstein, Josh Safdie, Anthony Katagas, and Timothée Chalamet, producers; The Secret Agent – Emilie Lesclaux, producer; Sentimental Value – Maria Ekerhovd and Andrea Berentsen Ottmar, producers; Sinners – Zinzi Coogler, Sev Ohanian, and Ryan Coogler, producers; Train Dreams – Marissa McMahon, Teddy Schwarzman, Will Janowitz, Ashley Schlaifer, and Michael Heimler, producers	**Best Directing**: **Paul Thomas Anderson – One Battle After Another ‡**; Chloé Zhao – Hamnet; Josh Safdie – Marty Supreme; Joachim Trier – Sentimental Value; Ryan Coogler – Sinners
**Best Actor in a Leading Role**: **Michael B. Jordan – Sinners as Elijah "Smoke" Moore / Elias "Stack" Moore ‡**; Timothée Chalamet – Marty Supreme as Marty Mauser; Leonardo DiCaprio – One Battle After Another as Bob Ferguson; Ethan Hawke – Blue Moon as Lorenz Hart; Wagner Moura – The Secret Agent as Armando Solimões / Marcelo Alves / Fernando Solimões	**Best Actress in a Leading Role**: **Jessie Buckley – Hamnet as Agnes Shakespeare ‡**; Rose Byrne – If I Had Legs I'd Kick You as Linda; Kate Hudson – Song Sung Blue as Claire Sardina; Renate Reinsve – Sentimental Value as Nora Borg; Emma Stone – Bugonia as Michelle Fuller
**Best Actor in a Supporting Role**: **Sean Penn – One Battle After Another as Col. Steven J. Lockjaw ‡**; Benicio del Toro – One Battle After Another as Sensei Sergio St. Carlos; Jacob Elordi – Frankenstein as The Creature; Delroy Lindo – Sinners as Delta Slim; Stellan Skarsgård – Sentimental Value as Gustav Borg	**Best Actress in a Supporting Role**: **Amy Madigan – Weapons as Aunt Gladys ‡**; Elle Fanning – Sentimental Value as Rachel Kemp; Inga Ibsdotter Lilleaas – Sentimental Value as Agnes Borg Pettersen; Wunmi Mosaku – Sinners as Annie; Teyana Taylor – One Battle After Another as Perfidia Beverly Hills
**Best Writing (Original Screenplay)**: **Sinners – Ryan Coogler ‡**; Blue Moon – Robert Kaplow; It Was Just an Accident – Jafar Panahi; in collaboration with Nader Saïvar, Shadmehr Rastin, and Mehdi Mahmoudian; Marty Supreme – Ronald Bronstein and Josh Safdie; Sentimental Value – Eskil Vogt and Joachim Trier	**Best Writing (Adapted Screenplay)**: **One Battle After Another – Paul Thomas Anderson; based on the novel Vineland by Thomas Pynchon ‡**; Bugonia – Will Tracy; based on the film Save the Green Planet! by Jang Joon-hwan; Frankenstein – Guillermo del Toro; based on the novel by Mary Shelley; Hamnet – Chloé Zhao and Maggie O'Farrell; based on the novel by Maggie O'Farrell; Train Dreams – Clint Bentley and Greg Kwedar; based on the novella by Denis Johnson
**Best Animated Feature Film**: **KPop Demon Hunters – Maggie Kang, Chris Appelhans, and Michelle L.M. Wong ‡**; Arco – Ugo Bienvenu, Félix de Givry, Sophie Mas, and Natalie Portman; Elio – Madeline Sharafian, Domee Shi, Adrian Molina, and Mary Alice Drumm; Little Amélie or the Character of Rain – Maïlys Vallade, Liane-Cho Han, Nidia Santiago, and Henri Magalon; Zootopia 2 – Jared Bush, Byron Howard, and Yvett Merino	**Best International Feature Film**: **Sentimental Value (Norway) in Norwegian, Swedish, and English – directed by Joachim Trier ‡**; It Was Just an Accident (France) in Persian and Azerbaijani – directed by Jafar Panahi; The Secret Agent (Brazil) in Portuguese and German – directed by Kleber Mendonça Filho; Sirāt (Spain) in Spanish, French, and Arabic – directed by Oliver Laxe; The Voice of Hind Rajab (Tunisia) in Arabic – directed by Kaouther Ben Hania
**Best Documentary Feature Film**: **Mr Nobody Against Putin – David Borenstein, Pavel Talankin, Helle Faber, and Alžběta Karásková ‡**; The Alabama Solution – Andrew Jarecki and Charlotte Kaufman; Come See Me in the Good Light – Ryan White, Jessica Hargrave, Tig Notaro, and Stef Willen; Cutting Through Rocks – Sara Khaki and Mohammadreza Eyni; The Perfect Neighbor – Geeta Gandbhir, Alisa Payne, Nikon Kwantu, and Sam Bisbee	**Best Documentary Short Film**: **All the Empty Rooms – Joshua Seftel and Conall Jones ‡**; Armed Only with a Camera: The Life and Death of Brent Renaud – Craig Renaud and Juan Arredondo; Children No More: "Were and Are Gone" – Hilla Medalia and Sheila Nevins; The Devil Is Busy – Christalyn Hampton and Geeta Gandbhir; Perfectly a Strangeness – Alison McAlpine
**Best Live Action Short Film**: **The Singers – Sam A. Davis and Jack Piatt ‡**; **Two People Exchanging Saliva – Alexandre Singh and Natalie Musteata ‡**; Butcher's Stain – Meyer Levinson-Blount and Oron Caspi; A Friend of Dorothy – Lee Knight and James Dean; Jane Austen's Period Drama – Julia Aks and Steve Pinder	**Best Animated Short Film**: **The Girl Who Cried Pearls – Chris Lavis and Maciek Szczerbowski ‡**; Butterfly – Florence Miailhe and Ron Dyens; Forevergreen – Nathan Engelhardt and Jeremy Spears; Retirement Plan – John Kelly and Andrew Freedman; The Three Sisters – Konstantin Bronzit
**Best Music (Original Score)**: **Sinners – Ludwig Göransson ‡**; Bugonia – Jerskin Fendrix; Frankenstein – Alexandre Desplat; Hamnet – Max Richter; One Battle After Another – Jonny Greenwood	**Best Music (Original Song)**: **"Golden" from KPop Demon Hunters – Music and lyrics by Ejae, Mark Sonnenblick, Joong Gyu Kwak, Yu Han Lee, Hee Dong Nam, Jeong Hoon Seo, and Teddy Park ‡**; "Dear Me" from Diane Warren: Relentless – Music and lyrics by Diane Warren; "I Lied to You" from Sinners – Music and lyrics by Raphael Saadiq and Ludwig Göransson; "Sweet Dreams of Joy" from Viva Verdi! – Music and lyrics by Nicholas Pike; "Train Dreams" from Train Dreams – Music by Nick Cave and Bryce Dessner; lyrics by Nick Cave
**Best Sound**: **F1 – Gareth John, Al Nelson, Gwendolyn Yates Whittle, Gary A. Rizzo, and Juan Peralta ‡**; Frankenstein – Greg Chapman, Nathan Robitaille, Nelson Ferreira, Christian Cooke, and Brad Zoern; One Battle After Another – José Antonio García, Christopher Scarabosio, and Tony Villaflor; Sinners – Chris Welcker, Benjamin A. Burtt, Felipe Pacheco, Brandon Proctor, and Steve Boeddeker; Sirāt – Amanda Villavieja, Laia Casanovas, and Yasmina Praderas	**Best Casting**: **One Battle After Another – Cassandra Kulukundis ‡**; Hamnet – Nina Gold; Marty Supreme – Jennifer Venditti; The Secret Agent – Gabriel Domingues; Sinners – Francine Maisler
**Best Production Design**: **Frankenstein – Production Design: Tamara Deverell; Set Decoration: Shane Vieau ‡**; Hamnet – Production Design: Fiona Crombie; Set Decoration: Alice Felton; Marty Supreme – Production Design: Jack Fisk; Set Decoration: Adam Willis; One Battle After Another – Production Design: Florencia Martin; Set Decoration: Anthony Carlino; Sinners – Production Design: Hannah Beachler; Set Decoration: Monique Champagne	**Best Cinematography**: **Sinners – Autumn Durald Arkapaw ‡**; Frankenstein – Dan Laustsen; Marty Supreme – Darius Khondji; One Battle After Another – Michael Bauman; Train Dreams – Adolpho Veloso
**Best Makeup and Hairstyling**: **Frankenstein – Mike Hill, Jordan Samuel, and Cliona Furey ‡**; Kokuho – Kyoko Toyokawa, Naomi Hibino, and Tadashi Nishimatsu; Sinners – Ken Diaz, Mike Fontaine, and Shunika Terry; The Smashing Machine – Kazu Hiro, Glen Griffin, and Bjoern Rehbein; The Ugly Stepsister – Thomas Foldberg and Anne Cathrine Sauerberg	**Best Costume Design**: **Frankenstein – Kate Hawley ‡**; Avatar: Fire and Ash – Deborah L. Scott; Hamnet – Malgosia Turzanska; Marty Supreme – Miyako Bellizzi; Sinners – Ruth E. Carter
**Best Film Editing**: **One Battle After Another – Andy Jurgensen ‡**; F1 – Stephen Mirrione; Marty Supreme – Ronald Bronstein and Josh Safdie; Sentimental Value – Olivier Bugge Coutté; Sinners – Michael P. Shawver	**Best Visual Effects**: **Avatar: Fire and Ash – Joe Letteri, Richard Baneham, Eric Saindon, and Daniel Barrett ‡**; F1 – Ryan Tudhope, Nicolas Chevallier, Robert Harrington, and Keith Dawson; Jurassic World Rebirth – David Vickery, Stephen Aplin, Charmaine Chan, and Neil Corbould; The Lost Bus – Charlie Noble, David Zaretti, Russell Bowen, and Brandon K. McLaughlin; Sinners – Michael Ralla, Espen Nordahl, Guido Wolter, and Donnie Dean

=== Governors Awards ===
The Academy held its 16th annual Governors Awards ceremony on November 16, 2025, during which the following awards were presented:

==== Academy Honorary Awards ====
- Debbie Allen – "A trailblazing choreographer and actor, whose work has captivated generations and crossed genres".
- Tom Cruise – For his "incredible commitment to [the] filmmaking community, to the theatrical experience, and to the stunts community".
- Wynn Thomas – "Production designer [who] has brought some of the most enduring films to life through a visionary eye and mastery of his craft".

==== Jean Hersholt Humanitarian Award ====
- Dolly Parton – A "beloved performer [who] exemplifies the spirit of the Jean Hersholt Humanitarian Award through her unwavering dedication to charitable efforts".

=== Films with multiple nominations and awards ===
Films with multiple nominations
Nominations	Film
16	Sinners
13	One Battle After Another
9	Frankenstein
9	Marty Supreme
9	Sentimental Value
8	Hamnet
4	Bugonia
4	F1
4	The Secret Agent
4	Train Dreams
2	Avatar: Fire and Ash
2	Blue Moon
2	It Was Just an Accident
2	KPop Demon Hunters
2	Sirāt

Films with multiple wins
Awards	Film
6	One Battle After Another
4	Sinners
3	Frankenstein
2	KPop Demon Hunters

== Presenters and performers ==
The following individuals, listed in order of appearance, presented awards or performed musical numbers: (Note: Attributed to multiple references:)

Presenters
Name(s)	Role
Matt Berry	Served as announcer for the 98th Academy Awards
Zoe Saldaña	Presented the award for Best Supporting Actress
Will Arnett Channing Tatum	Presented the awards for Best Animated Feature and Best Animated Short Film
Anne Hathaway Anna Wintour	Presented the awards for Best Costume Design and Best Makeup and Hairstyling
Paul Mescal Gwyneth Paltrow Chase Infiniti Wagner Moura Delroy Lindo	Presented the award for Best Casting
Kumail Nanjiani	Presented the award for Best Live Action Short Film
Kieran Culkin	Presented the award for Best Supporting Actor
Robert Downey Jr. Chris Evans	Presented the awards for Best Adapted Screenplay and Best Original Screenplay
Billy Crystal Rachel McAdams Barbra Streisand	Presented eulogies to Rob and Michele Reiner, Catherine O'Hara, Diane Keaton, and Robert Redford
Pedro Pascal Sigourney Weaver	Presented the awards for Best Production Design and Best Visual Effects
Jimmy Kimmel	Presented the awards for Best Documentary Short Film and Best Documentary Feature Film
Melissa McCarthy Rose Byrne Kristen Wiig Maya Rudolph Ellie Kemper	Presented the awards for Best Original Score and Best Sound
Lynette Howell Taylor (AMPAS president)	Presented speech about the Academy's educational programs and film preservation ventures
Bill Pullman Lewis Pullman	Presented the award for Best Film Editing
Demi Moore	Presented the award for Best Cinematography
Javier Bardem Priyanka Chopra Jonas	Presented the award for Best International Feature Film
Lionel Richie	Presented the award for Best Original Song
Robert Pattinson Zendaya	Presented the award for Best Director
Adrien Brody	Presented the award for Best Actor
Mikey Madison	Presented the award for Best Actress
Nicole Kidman Ewan McGregor	Presented the award for Best Picture

Performers
Name	Role	Performance
Michael Bearden	Conductor; Musical director	Orchestral
Conan O'Brien Josh Groban	Performers	"I Won" during the opening monologue
Miles Caton Misty Copeland Eric Gales Buddy Guy Brittany Howard Christone "Kingfish" Ingram Jayme Lawson Li Jun Li Bobby Rush Raphael Saadiq Shaboozey Alice Smith	Performers	"I Lied to You" from Sinners
Los Angeles Master Chorale	Performers	"Storybook Love" from The Princess Bride and "Amazing Grace" during the "In Memoriam" segment
Barbra Streisand	Performer	"The Way We Were" from The Way We Were during the Robert Redford tribute
Lauren Han Ejae Audrey Nuna Rei Ami	Performers	"Prologue (Hunter's Mantra)" and "Golden" from KPop Demon Hunters

== Ceremony information ==
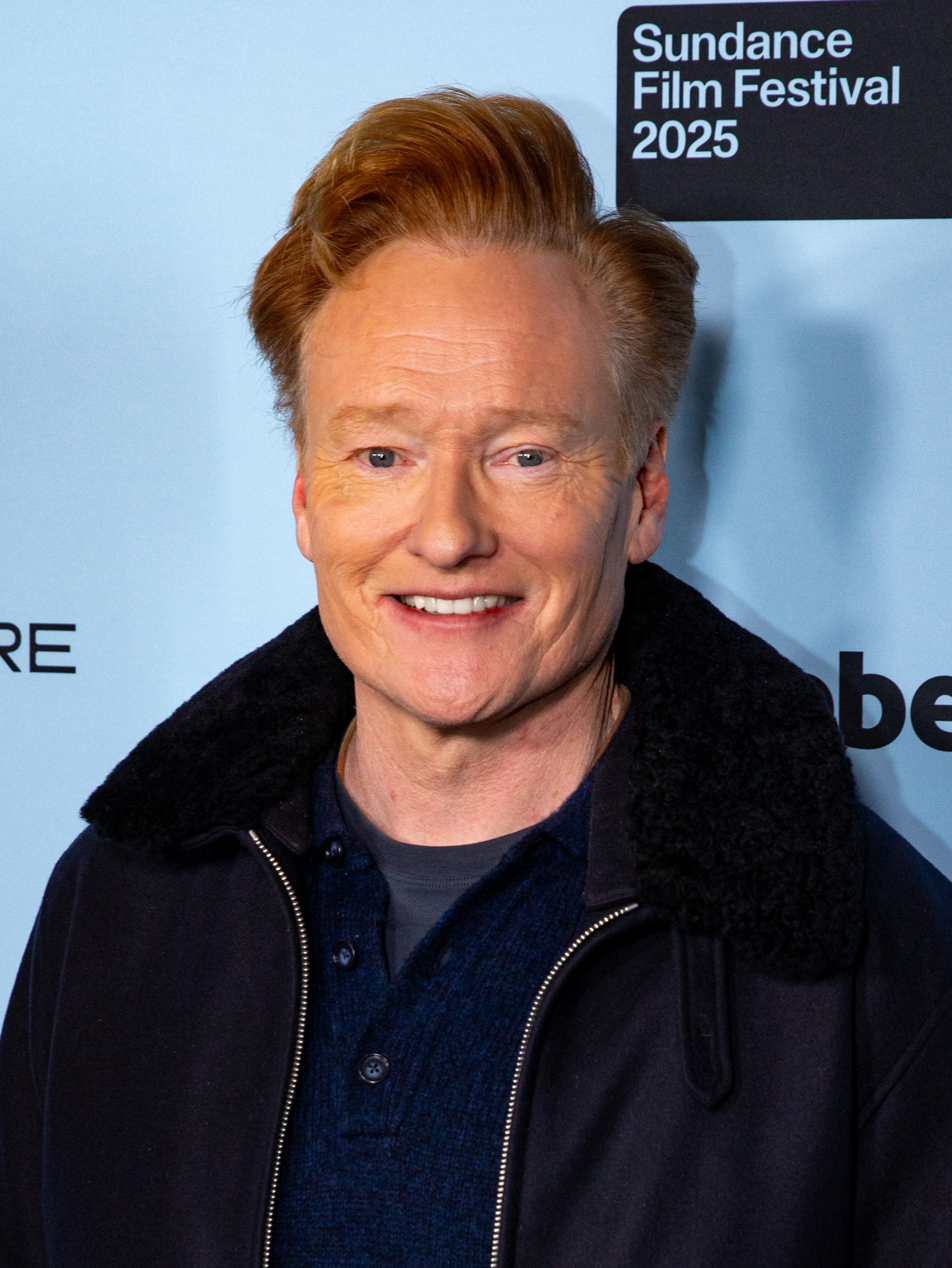
Conan O'Brien hosted the 98th Academy Awards.

In March 2025, the Academy hired television producers Raj Kapoor and Katy Mullan, for the third year in a row, to oversee production of the 2026 ceremony, with comedian and former talk show host Conan O'Brien as host of the event for the second consecutive year. Jeff Ross and Mike Sweeney, long-time collaborators of O'Brien, also returned as producers for a second time; Sweeney also served as a writer. "We are thrilled to bring back Conan, Raj, Katy, Jeff, and Mike for the 98th Oscars," stated AMPAS CEO Bill Kramer and then-AMPAS president Janet Yang in a press release. "[Last] year, they produced a hugely entertaining and visually stunning show that celebrated our nominees and the global film community in the most beautiful and impactful way. Conan was the perfect host — skillfully guiding us through the evening with humor, warmth and reverence. It is an honor to be working with them again." In response, Kapoor and Mullan stated in a press release, "We are both so honored to be returning in our roles for the 98th Oscars. We can't wait to work with Conan and his entire team as we continue to explore even more special and heartfelt opportunities to celebrate next year's nominees and the impact of film around the world."

Several others participated in the production of the ceremony and related events. Musician Michael Bearden was the musical director for the telecast; production designers Alana Billingsley and Misty Buckley designed a new stage for the show. According to Buckley and Billingsley in an article published by Vanity Fair, the stage was designed to resemble a garden courtyard made out of glass, metal, and stone adorned with handmade trees and plants. The stage was also equipped with moving components, including mechanized LED panels that could move around the stage and reveal new spaces. Comedian and journalist Amelia Dimoldenberg served as the social media and red carpet correspondent for the Oscars' online outlets. Choreographer Mandy Moore oversaw performances of the Best Original Song nominees "Golden" from KPop Demon Hunters and "I Lied to You" from Sinners; the latter featured cameos from Buddy Guy, Shaboozey, Brittany Howard, Christone "Kingfish" Ingram, Bobby Rush, Alice Smith, Eric Gales, and Misty Copeland. Josh Groban, Jane Lynch, Sterling K. Brown, Ashley Nicole Black, and Jim Downey appeared in scripted sketches, the latter reprising his role from One Battle After Another.

=== Introduction of Best Casting award and other rule changes ===
Beginning with this ceremony, AMPAS introduced a new competitive award that would honor casting directors. The award was announced in a February 2024 press release with Academy CEO Kramer and then-AMPAS president Yang stating, "Casting directors play an essential role in filmmaking, and as the Academy evolves, we are proud to add casting to the disciplines that we recognize and celebrate." Nominees would be initially voted in a preliminary round to determine a shortlist consisting of ten films. Each of the shortlisted films would have its respective casting director showcase their work in a shortlist presentation utilizing written notes highlighting the process, film reel clips, and a Q&A with members of the Casting branch. The members in that branch would narrow down the roster to five nominees, and the entire membership would then vote for the winner. A category to award achievement in casting had previously been rejected by the Academy in 1999.

Additional rule changes approved by the AMPAS Board of Governors in April 2025 included:

- Voters must now watch each of the nominated films in each category in order to vote for the winners of said category. Academy members could fulfill this requirement by watching the nominees on the Academy's streaming platform or uploading a ticket stub or any form of documentation stating that the member watched the film.
- In accordance with recommendations by the Academy’s Science and Technology Council regarding usage of Generative Artificial Intelligence in the filmmaking process, the group determined that the tools neither helped nor harmed a film's chances for receiving a nomination. The Academy and its branches would judge each achievement "taking into account the degree to which a human was at the heart of the creative authorship when choosing which movie to award."
- In the Best Picture category, films released in the first six months of the year must have shown proof of submission for Producers Guild of America (PGA) mark certification or awards-only determination by September 10, 2025; films released in the remaining months of the year must submit proof of submission for the PGA by November 13.
- For Best Animated Short Film, all Academy members were invited to participate in the nominations round.
- The Best Cinematography category would first have a preliminary short list featured ten to twenty films which would later be narrowed down to five nominees.
- For International Feature Film, eligibility rules regarding creative control now were updated in consideration of filmmakers with refugee or asylum status. The submitting country must confirm that creative control of the film was largely in the hands of citizens, residents, or individuals with refugee or asylum status in said submitting country.

=== Box office performance of Best Picture nominees ===
When the nominations were announced, eight of the ten films nominated for Best Picture had earned a combined gross of nearly $661.7 million at the American and Canadian box offices at the time. Sinners was the highest-grossing film among the Best Picture nominees with $280 million in domestic box office receipts. F1 came in second with $189.6 million; this was followed by Marty Supreme ($80.6 million), One Battle After Another ($71.6 million), Bugonia ($17.7 million), Hamnet ($15.3 million), Sentimental Value ($4.3 million), and The Secret Agent ($2.6 million). The box office figures for Frankenstein and Train Dreams were unavailable due to distributor Netflix's policy of refusing to release such figures.

=== Critical reviews ===
Robert Lloyd of the Los Angeles Times wrote, "With Conan O'Brien returning as host in 2026, the ceremony was much in the spirit of his first go in 2025, except this was all in all a livelier, funnier show." He also gave high marks toward the Best Original Song performances and the presentation of the "In Memoriam" segment. Rob Sheffield of Rolling Stone complimented the "surprise wins, timely jokes, poignant speeches", host O'Brien's "right amount of bratty irreverence" and the Redford tribute by Streisand, describing it as "the kind of Oscar magic that could only happen on this award show". Ben Travers of IndieWire opined that the show "felt like the first in a long time that were made with cinephiles top of mind," adding that O'Brien "brought his signature silliness and deft professionalism to a ceremony that thrived by giving film fans what they want".

Variety chief film critic Owen Gleiberman called the show "a tasteful and overly safe show sustained by just enough suspense". He described the production design as "pleasingly bland and comfortable and a bit generic, like the show itself" and criticized the lack of a "more explicit salute" to Best Picture winner One Battle After Another. Television critic Daniel Fienberg of The Hollywood Reporter complimented O'Brien's hosting and "stirring history-making wins," but pointed out the technical issues. Television critic Judy Berman of Time criticized prioritizing "devastating news headlines or late-night-style topical zingers or impassioned hand-wringing of any variety" over "a celebration of film artistry do what art does better than almost anything else". However, she did reserve praise for O'Brien's hosting performances and several of the winners' acceptance speeches.

=== Ratings and reception ===
The American telecast on ABC drew in an average of 17.86 million people over its length, which was a 9% decrease from the previous year's ceremony. The show also had 8.4% of households watching the ceremony based on Nielsen estimates, which was lower than the previous ceremony. Additionally, it garnered a lower 18–49 demo rating with a 3.92 rating among viewers in that demographic.

In July 2026, the broadcast was nominated for six awards at the 78th Primetime Emmy Awards. However, it failed to win any of its nominations.

== "In Memoriam" ==
The annual "In Memoriam" tribute honored the following individuals.

- Rob Reiner – actor, filmmaker
- Michele Singer Reiner – producer
- Isiah Whitlock Jr. – actor
- Homayoun Ershadi – actor
- Tom Stoppard – screenwriter, playwright
- Jackie Burch – casting director
- Stuart Craig – production designer
- Terence Stamp – actor
- Sally Kirkland – actress
- Lalo Schifrin – composer, musician
- T. K. Carter – actor
- Allie Light – documentary filmmaker
- Don Rogers – sound
- Arthur Cohn – producer
- Rosanna Norton – costume designer
- Lee Tamahori – director
- Claudia Cardinale – actress
- Béla Tarr – director
- Tatsuya Nakadai – actor
- Peter Kwong – actor
- Udo Kier – actor
- Christine Choy – documentary filmmaker
- Eduardo Serra – cinematographer
- Mark Peploe – writer
- Leslie Dilley – production designer
- Roger Allers – animator
- Loren Carpenter – animator, founding employee of Pixar
- Joel Sill – music supervisor
- Mary Cybulski – script supervisor
- David Steinberg – manager
- Andrew Karpen – executive
- Jeremy Larner – writer, author
- Giorgio Armani – fashion designer
- Michèle Burke – makeup artist
- Billy Williams – cinematographer
- Robert D. Benton – writer, director
- Diane Ladd – actress
- Diane Keaton – actress
- Catherine O'Hara – actress
- Stanley R. Jaffe – producer, executive
- Frederick Wiseman – documentary filmmaker
- Pauline Collins – actress
- Michael Madsen – actor
- Arthur Hamilton – songwriter
- Marcel Ophuls – documentary filmmaker
- Marvin Levy – publicist, marketing executive
- Mohammad Bakri – actor, director
- Kirk Francis – production mixer
- Don Hall – sound editor
- Skip Brittenham – lawyer
- Con Pederson – visual effects
- Drew Struzan – poster artist
- Nancy Seltzer – publicist
- Richard Kahn – marketing executive, past Academy president
- Frank Price – executive
- Don Zimmerman – film editor
- Wiliam Steinkamp – film editor
- Greg Cannom – makeup artist
- Theodor Pištěk – costume designer
- Cary-Hiroyuki Tagawa – actor
- Susie Figgis – casting director
- Alan Bergman – songwriter, lyricist
- Gianni Quaranta – production designer
- Graham Greene – actor
- Val Kilmer – actor
- Robert Duvall – actor
- Robert Redford – actor, filmmaker

During the tribute, Billy Crystal presented a tribute to Rob Reiner, Rachel McAdams eulogized Diane Keaton and Catherine O'Hara, and Barbra Streisand honored Robert Redford. Crystal's tribute to Reiner was joined by Kathy Bates, Annette Bening, John Cusack, Cary Elwes, Christopher Guest, Carol Kane, Michael McKean, Demi Moore, Jerry O'Connell, Mandy Patinkin, Kevin Pollak, Meg Ryan, Fred Savage, Kiefer Sutherland, Wil Wheaton, and Daphne Zuniga.

== See also ==
- List of submissions to the 98th Academy Awards for Best Animated Feature
- List of submissions to the 98th Academy Awards for Best Documentary Feature
- List of submissions to the 98th Academy Awards for Best International Feature Film
