= List of accolades received by Frankenstein (2025 film) =

Frankenstein is a 2025 American Gothic science fiction horror film written, co-produced, and directed by Guillermo del Toro, based on the 1818 novel by Mary Shelley. The film stars Oscar Isaac as Victor Frankenstein and Jacob Elordi as the Creature, with Mia Goth and Christoph Waltz in supporting roles. The story follows the life of Frankenstein, an egotistical scientist whose experiment in creating new life results in dangerous consequences.

The film received generally positive reviews from critics. Both the National Board of Review and the American Film Institute named it as one of the top ten films of 2025. It received five nominations at the 83rd Golden Globe Awards, including Best Motion Picture – Drama, and nine nominations at the 98th Academy Awards, including Best Picture, Best Adapted Screenplay and Best Supporting Actor (Elordi), and won for Best Costume Design, Best Makeup and Hairstyling, and Best Production Design.

== Accolades ==
Award	Date of ceremony	Category	Recipient(s)	Result	Ref.
AACTA International Awards	February 6, 2026	Best Direction	Guillermo del Toro	Nominated	
AACTA International Awards	February 6, 2026	Best Supporting Actor	Jacob Elordi	Won	
AACTA International Awards	February 6, 2026	Best Supporting Actress	Mia Goth	Nominated	
AARP Movies for Grownups Awards	January 10, 2026	Best Director	Guillermo del Toro	Won	
Academy Awards	March 15, 2026	Best Picture	Guillermo del Toro, J. Miles Dale, and Scott Stuber	Nominated	
Academy Awards	March 15, 2026	Best Supporting Actor	Jacob Elordi	Nominated	
Academy Awards	March 15, 2026	Best Adapted Screenplay	Guillermo del Toro	Nominated	
Academy Awards	March 15, 2026	Best Cinematography	Dan Laustsen	Nominated	
Academy Awards	March 15, 2026	Best Production Design	Production Design: Tamara Deverell; Set Decoration: Shane Vieau	Won	
Academy Awards	March 15, 2026	Best Costume Design	Kate Hawley	Won	
Academy Awards	March 15, 2026	Best Makeup and Hairstyling	Mike Hil, Jordan Samuel, and Cliona Furey	Won	
Academy Awards	March 15, 2026	Best Original Score	Alexandre Desplat	Nominated	
Academy Awards	March 15, 2026	Best Sound	Greg Chapman, Nathan Robitaille, Nelson Ferreira, Christian Cooke, and Brad Zoern	Nominated	
Actor Awards	March 1, 2026	Outstanding Performance by a Male Actor in a Supporting Role	Jacob Elordi	Nominated	
Actor Awards	March 1, 2026	Outstanding Performance by a Cast in a Motion Picture	David Bradley, Christian Convery, Charles Dance, Jacob Elordi, Mia Goth, Oscar Isaac, Felix Kammerer, Lars Mikkelsen, and Christoph Waltz	Nominated	
Actor Awards	March 1, 2026	Outstanding Stunt Ensemble in a Motion Picture	Alex Armbruster, Tack Baldwin, Mig Buenacruz, Dan Chapman, Brent Connolly, Daniel Cudmore, Elizabeth Donker Curtius, Nicholas Daines, James Eddy, Doren Farmer, Carl Fortin, Corbin Fox, Simon Girard, Ivett Gonda, Clayton Grover, Peter Guiney, Ess Hödlmoser, Dillon Jagersky, Kelly Jones, Spencer Jones, Dave Judge, Stephane Julien, Maxime Laurin, Mathieu Ledoux, Nick Longhurst, Thomas Lorber, Jake Loube, Chris Manger, Geoff Meech, Lee Morrison, Michael Murray, Jason Oettle, Dylan Rampulla, Max Savaria, Geoff Scovell, Adam Smith, Jonathan Vellner, Violet Verigo, Marshall Virtue, Al Vrjljan, Marcus White, Pete White, Leonie Wilkinson, Tyler Williams, and Eli Zagoudakis	Nominated	
African-American Film Critics Association	December 9, 2025	Top 10 Films of the Year	Frankenstein	4th place	
Alliance of Women Film Journalists	December 31, 2025	Best Film	Frankenstein	Nominated	
Alliance of Women Film Journalists	December 31, 2025	Best Screenplay, Adapted	Guillermo del Toro	Nominated	
Alliance of Women Film Journalists	December 31, 2025	Best Actor, Supporting	Jacob Elordi	Nominated	
Alliance of Women Film Journalists	December 31, 2025	Best Cinematography	Dan Laustsen	Nominated	
American Film Institute Awards	December 4, 2025	Top 10 Films	Frankenstein	Won (Note: Award shared with nine other films.)	
American Society of Cinematographers Awards	March 8, 2026	Theatrical Feature Film	Dan Laustsen	Nominated	
Art Directors Guild Awards	February 28, 2026	Best Period Feature Film	Tamara Deverell	Won	
Astra Film Awards	January 9, 2026	Best Picture – Drama	Frankenstein	Nominated	
Astra Film Awards	January 9, 2026	Best Director	Guillermo del Toro	Nominated	
Astra Film Awards	January 9, 2026	Best Adapted Screenplay	Guillermo del Toro	Nominated	
Astra Film Awards	January 9, 2026	Best Supporting Actor – Drama	Jacob Elordi	Nominated	
Astra Film Awards	January 9, 2026	Best Score	Alexandre Desplat	Nominated	
Astra Film Awards	December 11, 2025	Best Cinematography	Dan Laustsen	Nominated	
Astra Film Awards	December 11, 2025	Best Costume Design	Kate Hawley	Won	
Astra Film Awards	December 11, 2025	Best Makeup and Hairstyling	Mike Hill, Jordan Samuel, and Cliona Furey	Won	
Astra Film Awards	December 11, 2025	Best Production Design	Tamara Deverell	Won	
Astra Film Awards	December 11, 2025	Best Sound	Nathan Robitaille, Nelson Ferreira, Christian Cooke, Brad Zoern, and Greg Chapman (Production Sound Mixer)	Nominated	
Astra Film Awards	December 11, 2025	Best Stunts	Frankenstein	Nominated	
Astra Film Awards	December 11, 2025	Best Stunt Coordinator	Eli Zagoudakis & Marshall Virtue	Nominated	
Astra Film Awards	December 11, 2025	Best Visual Effects	Dennis Berardi, Ayo Burgess, Ivan Busquets, and José Granell	Nominated	
Austin Film Critics Association	December 18, 2025	Best Picture	Frankenstein	Nominated	
Austin Film Critics Association	December 18, 2025	Best Director	Guillermo del Toro	Nominated	
Austin Film Critics Association	December 18, 2025	Best Supporting Actor	Jacob Elordi	Nominated	
Austin Film Critics Association	December 18, 2025	Best Adapted Screenplay	Guillermo del Toro	Nominated	
Austin Film Critics Association	December 18, 2025	Best Cinematography	Dan Laustsen	Nominated	
Austin Film Critics Association	December 18, 2025	Best Original Score	Alexandre Desplat	Nominated	
Austin Film Critics Association	December 18, 2025	Best Visual Effects	Dennis Berardi, Ayo Burgess, Ivan Busquets, and José Granell	Nominated	
Austin Film Critics Association	December 18, 2025	Best Remake/Franchise Film	Frankenstein	Nominated	
British Academy Film Awards	February 22, 2026	Best Actor in a Supporting Role	Jacob Elordi	Nominated	
British Academy Film Awards	February 22, 2026	Best Cinematography	Dan Laustsen	Nominated	
British Academy Film Awards	February 22, 2026	Best Production Design	Production Design: Tamara Deverell; Set Decoration: Shane Vieau	Won	
British Academy Film Awards	February 22, 2026	Best Costume Design	Kate Hawley	Won	
British Academy Film Awards	February 22, 2026	Best Makeup and Hair	Jordan Samuel, Cliona Furey, Mike Hill and Megan Many	Won	
British Academy Film Awards	February 22, 2026	Best Original Score	Alexandre Desplat	Nominated	
British Academy Film Awards	February 22, 2026	Best Sound	Greg Chapman, Nathan Robitaille, Nelson Ferreira, Christian Cooke, and Brad Zoern	Nominated	
British Academy Film Awards	February 22, 2026	Best Special Visual Effects	Dennis Berardi, Ayo Burgess, Ivan Busquets, and José Granell	Nominated	
British Society of Cinematographers Awards	February 7, 2026	Best Cinematography in a Theatrical Feature Film	Dan Laustsen	Nominated	
Capri Hollywood International Film Festival	January 5, 2026	Best Picture	Frankenstein	Won	
Capri Hollywood International Film Festival	January 5, 2026	Best Production Design	Tamara Deverell	Won	
Capri Hollywood International Film Festival	January 5, 2026	Best Cinematography	Dan Laustsen	Won	
Capri Hollywood International Film Festival	January 5, 2026	Best Costume Design	Kate Hawley	Won	
Capri Hollywood International Film Festival	January 5, 2026	Best Makeup and Hairstyling	Mike Hill	Won	
Capri Hollywood International Film Festival	January 5, 2026	Best Original Score	Alexandre Desplat	Won	
Capri Hollywood International Film Festival	January 5, 2026	Capri Producer Award	Guillermo del Toro, J. Miles Dale, Scott Stuber	Won	
Casting Society of America	February 26, 2026	Feature Big Budget – Drama	Robin D. Cook, Associate Casting Director: Jonathan Oliveira	Nominated	
CEC Medals	February 23, 2026	Best Foreign Film	Frankenstein	Won	
Celebration of Cinema and Television	October 24, 2025	Actor – Film	Oscar Isaac	Won	
Chicago Film Critics Association	December 11, 2025	Best Supporting Actor	Jacob Elordi	Nominated	
Chicago Film Critics Association	December 11, 2025	Best Art Direction/Best Production Design	Tamara Deverell	Won	
Chicago Film Critics Association	December 11, 2025	Best Cinematography	Dan Laustsen	Nominated	
Chicago Film Critics Association	December 11, 2025	Best Costume Design	Kate Hawley	Won	
Chicago Film Critics Association	December 11, 2025	Best Use of Visual Effects	Dennis Berardi, Ayo Burgess and Ivan Busquets (VFX supervisors) and José Granell	Nominated	
Cinema Audio Society Awards	March 7, 2026	Filmmaker Award	Guillermo del Toro	Won	
Cinema Audio Society Awards	March 7, 2026	Outstanding Achievement in Sound Mixing for a Motion Picture – Live Action	Frankenstein	Nominated	
Costume Designers Guild Awards	February 12, 2026	Excellence in Period Film	Kate Hawley	Won	
Critics' Choice Movie Awards	January 4, 2026	Best Picture	Frankenstein	Nominated	
Critics' Choice Movie Awards	January 4, 2026	Best Director	Guillermo del Toro	Nominated	
Critics' Choice Movie Awards	January 4, 2026	Best Supporting Actor	Jacob Elordi	Won	
Critics' Choice Movie Awards	January 4, 2026	Best Adapted Screenplay	Guillermo del Toro	Nominated	
Critics' Choice Movie Awards	January 4, 2026	Best Cinematography	Dan Laustsen	Nominated	
Critics' Choice Movie Awards	January 4, 2026	Best Costume Design	Kate Hawley	Won	
Critics' Choice Movie Awards	January 4, 2026	Best Production Design	Tamara Deverell and Shane Vieau	Won	
Critics' Choice Movie Awards	January 4, 2026	Best Score	Alexandre Desplat	Nominated	
Critics' Choice Movie Awards	January 4, 2026	Best Hair and Make-Up	Mike Hill, Jordan Samuel, and Cliona Furey	Won	
Critics' Choice Movie Awards	January 4, 2026	Best Visual Effects	Dennis Berardi, Ayo Burgess, Ivan Busquets, and José Granell	Nominated	
Critics' Choice Movie Awards	January 4, 2026	Best Sound	Nathan Robitaille, Nelson Ferreira, Christian Cooke, Brad Zoern, and Greg Chapman	Nominated	
Dallas–Fort Worth Film Critics Association	December 17, 2025	Best Picture	Frankenstein	7th place	
Dallas–Fort Worth Film Critics Association	December 17, 2025	Best Director	Guillermo del Toro	5th place	
Dallas–Fort Worth Film Critics Association	December 17, 2025	Best Musical Score	Alexandre Desplat	Runner-up	
Directors Guild of America Awards	February 7, 2026	Outstanding Directing – Feature Film	Guillermo del Toro	Nominated	
Directors Guild of Canada	November 8, 2025	Feature Film Crew Of The Year	Frankenstein	Won	
Fangoria Chainsaw Awards	October 25, 2026	Best Supporting Performance	Jacob Elordi	Nominated	
Fangoria Chainsaw Awards	October 25, 2026	Best Score	Alexandre Desplat	Nominated	
Fangoria Chainsaw Awards	October 25, 2026	Best Costume Design	Kate Hawley	Won	
Fangoria Chainsaw Awards	October 25, 2026	Best Makeup FX	Mike Hill	Won	
Florida Film Critics Circle	December 19, 2025	Best Visual Effects	Dennis Berardi, Ayo Burgess, Ivan Busquets, and José Granell	Runner-up	
Florida Film Critics Circle	December 19, 2025	Best Production Design & Art Direction	Tamara Deverell and Shane Vieau	Runner-up	
Georgia Film Critics Association	December 27, 2025	Best Supporting Actor	Jacob Elordi	Runner-up	
Georgia Film Critics Association	December 27, 2025	Best Adapted Screenplay	Guillermo del Toro	Nominated	
Georgia Film Critics Association	December 27, 2025	Best Cinematography	Dan Laustsen	Nominated	
Georgia Film Critics Association	December 27, 2025	Best Production Design	Tamara Deverell and Shane Vieau	Won	
Golden Globe Awards	January 11, 2026	Best Motion Picture – Drama	Frankenstein	Nominated	
Golden Globe Awards	January 11, 2026	Best Actor in a Motion Picture – Drama	Oscar Isaac	Nominated	
Golden Globe Awards	January 11, 2026	Best Supporting Actor – Motion Picture	Jacob Elordi	Nominated	
Golden Globe Awards	January 11, 2026	Best Director	Guillermo del Toro	Nominated	
Golden Globe Awards	January 11, 2026	Best Original Score	Alexandre Desplat	Nominated	
Golden Reel Awards	March 8, 2026	Outstanding Achievement in Sound Editing – Feature Dialogue / ADR	Supervising Sound Editor: Nelson Ferreira MPSE, Dialogue Editors: Stephen Barden MPSE, Dustin Harris MPSE, Danielle McBride MPSE, Jill Purdy MPSE	Nominated	
Golden Reel Awards	March 8, 2026	Outstanding Achievement in Sound Editing – Feature Effects / Foley	Supervising Sound Editor: Nathan Robitaille MPSE, Sound Designer: Nathan Robitaille MPSE, Sound Effects Editors: Paul Germann MPSE, Scott Hitchon MPSE, Craig MacLellan, Dashen Naidoo, Foley Editors: Jenna Dalla Riva, Chelsea Body,Foley Artists: Goro Koyama, Sandra Fox MPSE	Won	
Gotham Awards	December 1, 2025	Outstanding Supporting Performance	Jacob Elordi	Nominated	
Gotham Awards	December 1, 2025	Vanguard Tribute	Guillermo del Toro, Oscar Isaac, and Jacob Elordi	Won	
Hollywood Music in Media Awards	November 19, 2025	Score – Feature Film	Alexandre Desplat	Nominated	
Hugo Awards	August 30, 2026	Best Dramatic Presentation, Long Form	Frankenstein	Nominated	
IndieWire Honors	December 4, 2025	Wavelength Award	Jacob Elordi and Mike Hill	Won	
Kansas City Film Critics Circle	December 21, 2025	Best Film	Frankenstein	Nominated	
Kansas City Film Critics Circle	December 21, 2025	Best Director	Guillermo del Toro	Nominated	
Kansas City Film Critics Circle	December 21, 2025	Best Supporting Actor	Jacob Elordi	Nominated	
Kansas City Film Critics Circle	December 21, 2025	Best Adapted Screenplay	Guillermo del Toro	Nominated	
Kansas City Film Critics Circle	December 21, 2025	Best Cinematography	Dan Laustsen	Nominated	
Kansas City Film Critics Circle	December 21, 2025	Best Original Score	Alexandre Desplat	Nominated	
Kansas City Film Critics Circle	December 21, 2025	Best Science Fiction/Fantasy/Horror	Frankenstein	Nominated	
London Film Critics' Circle	February 1, 2026	Supporting Actor of the Year	Jacob Elordi	Nominated	
Los Angeles Film Critics Association	December 7, 2025	Best Production Design	Tamara Deverell	Runner-up	
Make-Up Artists & Hair Stylists Guild	February 14, 2026	Best Period and/or Character Make-Up	Jordan Samuel, Oriana Rossi, Kristin Wayne, Patricia Keighran, and Lizzi Lawson Zeiss	Nominated	
Make-Up Artists & Hair Stylists Guild	February 14, 2026	Best Period Hair Styling and/or Character Hair Styling	Cliona Furey, Tim Nolan, Laura Solari, Tori Binns, and Katarina Chovanec	Nominated	
Make-Up Artists & Hair Stylists Guild	February 14, 2026	Best Special Make-Up Effects	Mike Hill and Megan Many	Won	
Marrakech International Film Festival Awards	December 6, 2025	Tribute – Golden Star Award	Guillermo del Toro	Honored	
Middleburg Film Festival	October 19, 2025	Special Achievement in Costume Design Award	Kate Hawley	Won	
National Board of Review	December 3, 2025	Top 10 Films	Frankenstein	Won	
Newport Beach Film Festival	October 22, 2025	Outstanding Cinematography	Dan Laustsen	Won	
Newport Beach Film Festival	October 22, 2025	Maverick Award	Jacob Elordi	Won	
New York Film Critics Online	December 15, 2025	Best Supporting Actor	Jacob Elordi	Won	
New York Film Critics Online	December 15, 2025	Best Cinematography	Dan Laustsen	Nominated	
Online Film & Television Association	February 15, 2026	Best Picture	Frankenstein	Nominated	
Online Film & Television Association	February 15, 2026	Best Supporting Actor	Jacob Elordi	Won	
Online Film & Television Association	February 15, 2026	Best Director	Guillermo del Toro	Nominated	
Online Film & Television Association	February 15, 2026	Best Adapted Screenplay	Guillermo del Toro	Nominated	
Online Film & Television Association	February 15, 2026	Best Original Score	Alexandre Desplat	Nominated	
Online Film & Television Association	February 15, 2026	Best Cinematography	Dan Laustsen	Nominated	
Online Film & Television Association	February 15, 2026	Best Production Design	Tamara Deverell and Shane Vieau	Won	
Online Film & Television Association	February 15, 2026	Best Costume Design	Kate Hawley	Won	
Online Film & Television Association	February 15, 2026	Best Makeup and Hair	Mike Hill, Jordan Samuel, and Cliona Furey	Won	
Online Film & Television Association	February 15, 2026	Best Sound	Frankenstein	Nominated	
Online Film & Television Association	February 15, 2026	Best Sound Effects	Frankenstein	Nominated	
Online Film & Television Association	February 15, 2026	Best Visual Effects	Dennis Berardi, Ayo Burgess, Ivan Busquets, and José Granell	Nominated	
Palm Springs International Film Festival	January 3, 2026	Visionary Award	Guillermo del Toro, Oscar Isaac, Jacob Elordi, and Mia Goth	Won	
Phoenix Film Critics Society	December 15, 2025	Top Ten Films	Frankenstein	Won	
Phoenix Film Critics Society	December 15, 2025	Best Production Design	Tamara Deverell	Won	
Producers Guild of America Awards	February 28, 2026	Darryl F. Zanuck Award for Outstanding Producer of Theatrical Motion Pictures	Guillermo del Toro, J. Miles Dale and Scott Stuber	Nominated	
San Diego Film Critics Society	December 15, 2025	Best Supporting Actor	Jacob Elordi	Nominated	
San Diego Film Critics Society	December 15, 2025	Best Cinematography	Dan Laustsen	Nominated	
San Diego Film Critics Society	December 15, 2025	Best Production Design	Tamara Deverell	Won	
San Diego Film Critics Society	December 15, 2025	Best Visual Effects	Dennis Berardi, Ayo Burgess, Ivan Busquets, and José Granell	Nominated	
San Diego Film Critics Society	December 15, 2025	Best Costume Design	Kate Hawley	Runner-up	
San Diego Film Critics Society	December 15, 2025	Best Sound Design	Nathan Robitaille, Nelson Ferreira, Christian Cooke, Brad Zoern, and Greg Chapman	Nominated	
San Francisco Film Critics	December 14, 2025	Best Supporting Actor	Jacob Elordi	Nominated	
San Francisco Film Critics	December 14, 2025	Best Cinematography	Dan Laustsen	Nominated	
San Francisco Film Critics	December 14, 2025	Best Production Design	Tamara Deverell	Runner-up	
San Francisco Film Critics	December 14, 2025	Best Score	Alexandre Desplat	Nominated	
San Francisco International Film Festival	November 12, 2025	Sloan Science in Cinema Prize	Frankenstein	Won	
Santa Barbara International Film Festival	February 8, 2026	Virtuoso Award	Jacob Elordi	Honored	
Satellite Awards	March 10, 2026	Best Motion Picture – Drama	Frankenstein	Nominated	
Satellite Awards	March 10, 2026	Best Director	Guillermo del Toro	Nominated	
Satellite Awards	March 10, 2026	Best Actor in a Motion Picture – Drama	Oscar Isaac	Nominated	
Satellite Awards	March 10, 2026	Best Actor in a Supporting Role	Jacob Elordi	Nominated	
Satellite Awards	March 10, 2026	Best Cinematography	Dan Laustsen	Nominated	
Satellite Awards	March 10, 2026	Best Costume Design	Kate Hawley	Won	
Satellite Awards	March 10, 2026	Best Production Design	Tamara Deverell and Shane Vieau	Won	
Satellite Awards	March 10, 2026	Best Original Score	Alexandre Desplat	Nominated	
Satellite Awards	March 10, 2026	Best Makeup & Hair	Mike Hill, Jordan Samuel, and Cliona Furey	Nominated	
Satellite Awards	March 10, 2026	Best Visual Effects	Dennis Berardi, Ayo Burgess, Ivan Busquets, and José Granell	Nominated	
Saturn Awards	March 8, 2026	Best Horror Film	Frankenstein	Won	
Saturn Awards	March 8, 2026	Best Film Director	Guillermo del Toro	Nominated	
Saturn Awards	March 8, 2026	Best Writing	Guillermo del Toro	Nominated	
Saturn Awards	March 8, 2026	Best Actor	Oscar Isaac	Nominated	
Saturn Awards	March 8, 2026	Best Supporting Actor	Jacob Elordi	Won	
Saturn Awards	March 8, 2026	Best Supporting Actress	Mia Goth	Nominated	
Saturn Awards	March 8, 2026	Best Film Editing	Evan Schiff	Nominated	
Saturn Awards	March 8, 2026	Best Costume Design	Kate Hawley	Won	
Saturn Awards	March 8, 2026	Best Production Design	Tamara Deverell and Shane Vieau	Nominated	
Saturn Awards	March 8, 2026	Best Music	Alexandre Desplat	Nominated	
Saturn Awards	March 8, 2026	Best Makeup	Mike Hill, Megan Many	Won	
Saturn Awards	March 8, 2026	Best Special Effects	Dennis Berardi, Ayo Burgess, Ivan Busquets, and José Granell	Nominated	
Seattle Film Critics Society	December 15, 2025	Best Actor in a Supporting Role	Jacob Elordi	Nominated	
Seattle Film Critics Society	December 15, 2025	Best Cinematography	Dan Laustsen	Nominated	
Seattle Film Critics Society	December 15, 2025	Best Costume Design	Kate Hawley	Won	
Seattle Film Critics Society	December 15, 2025	Best Original Score	Alexandre Desplat	Nominated	
Seattle Film Critics Society	December 15, 2025	Best Production Design	Tamara Deverell and Shane Vieau	Won	
Seattle Film Critics Society	December 15, 2025	Best Visual Effects Design	Dennis Berardi, Ayo Burgess, Ivan Busquets, and José Granell	Nominated	
Set Decorators Society Of America Awards	February 21, 2026	Best Achievement in Décor/Design of a Fantasy or Science Fiction Feature Film	Set Decoration by Shane Vieau SDSA; Production Design by Tamara Deverell	Won	
Society of Composers & Lyricists Awards	February 6, 2026	Outstanding Original Score for a Studio Film	Alexandre Desplat	Nominated	
Southeastern Film Critics Association	December 16, 2025	Top Ten Films	Frankenstein	9th place	
St. Louis Film Critics Association Awards	December 14, 2025	Best Film	Frankenstein	Nominated	
St. Louis Film Critics Association Awards	December 14, 2025	Best Adapted Screenplay	Guillermo del Toro	Nominated	
St. Louis Film Critics Association Awards	December 14, 2025	Best Cinematography	Dan Laustsen	Nominated	
St. Louis Film Critics Association Awards	December 14, 2025	Best Costume Design	Kate Hawley	Won	
St. Louis Film Critics Association Awards	December 14, 2025	Best Production Design	Tamara Deverell and Shane Vieau	Won	
St. Louis Film Critics Association Awards	December 14, 2025	Best Original Score	Alexandre Desplat	Nominated	
St. Louis Film Critics Association Awards	December 14, 2025	Best Horror Film	Frankenstein	Nominated	
The Fashion Awards	December 1, 2025	Costume Designer of the Year	Kate Hawley	Won	
Toronto Film Critics Association	December 7, 2025	Best Actor in a Supporting Role	Jacob Elordi	Runner-up	
TIFF Tribute Awards	September 7, 2025	Ebert Director Award	Guillermo del Toro	Honored	
Toronto International Film Festival	September 14, 2025	People's Choice Award	Frankenstein	Runner-up	
USC Scripter Awards	January 24, 2026	Film	Frankenstein (Guillermo del Toro)	Nominated	
Venice International Film Festival	September 6, 2025	Golden Lion	Guillermo del Toro	Nominated	
Venice International Film Festival	September 6, 2025	Fanheart3 Award – Graffetta d'Oro for Best Film	Frankenstein	Won	
Washington DC Area Film Critics Association	December 7, 2025	Best Supporting Actor	Jacob Elordi	Nominated	
Washington DC Area Film Critics Association	December 7, 2025	Best Adapted Screenplay	Guillermo del Toro	Nominated	
Washington DC Area Film Critics Association	December 7, 2025	Best Production Design	Tamara Deverell and Shane Vieau	Nominated	
Washington DC Area Film Critics Association	December 7, 2025	Best Cinematography	Dan Laustsen	Nominated	
Washington DC Area Film Critics Association	December 7, 2025	Best Score	Alexandre Desplat	Nominated	
Writers Guild of America Awards	March 8, 2026	Best Adapted Screenplay	Guillermo del Toro; based on the novel by Mary Shelley	Nominated	
