= List of accolades received by Inside Out 2 =

Awards received by Inside Out 2

Inside Out 2 accolades
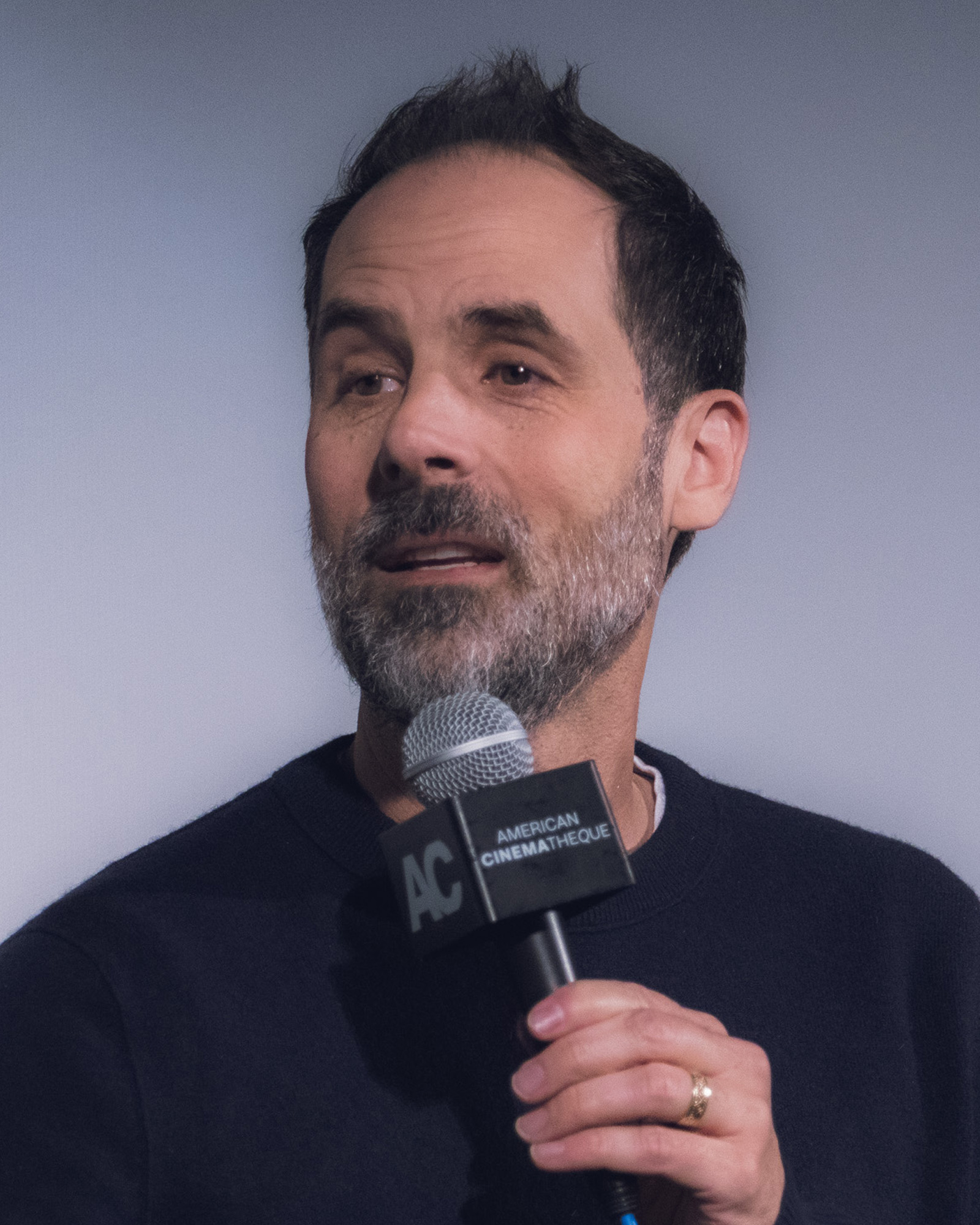
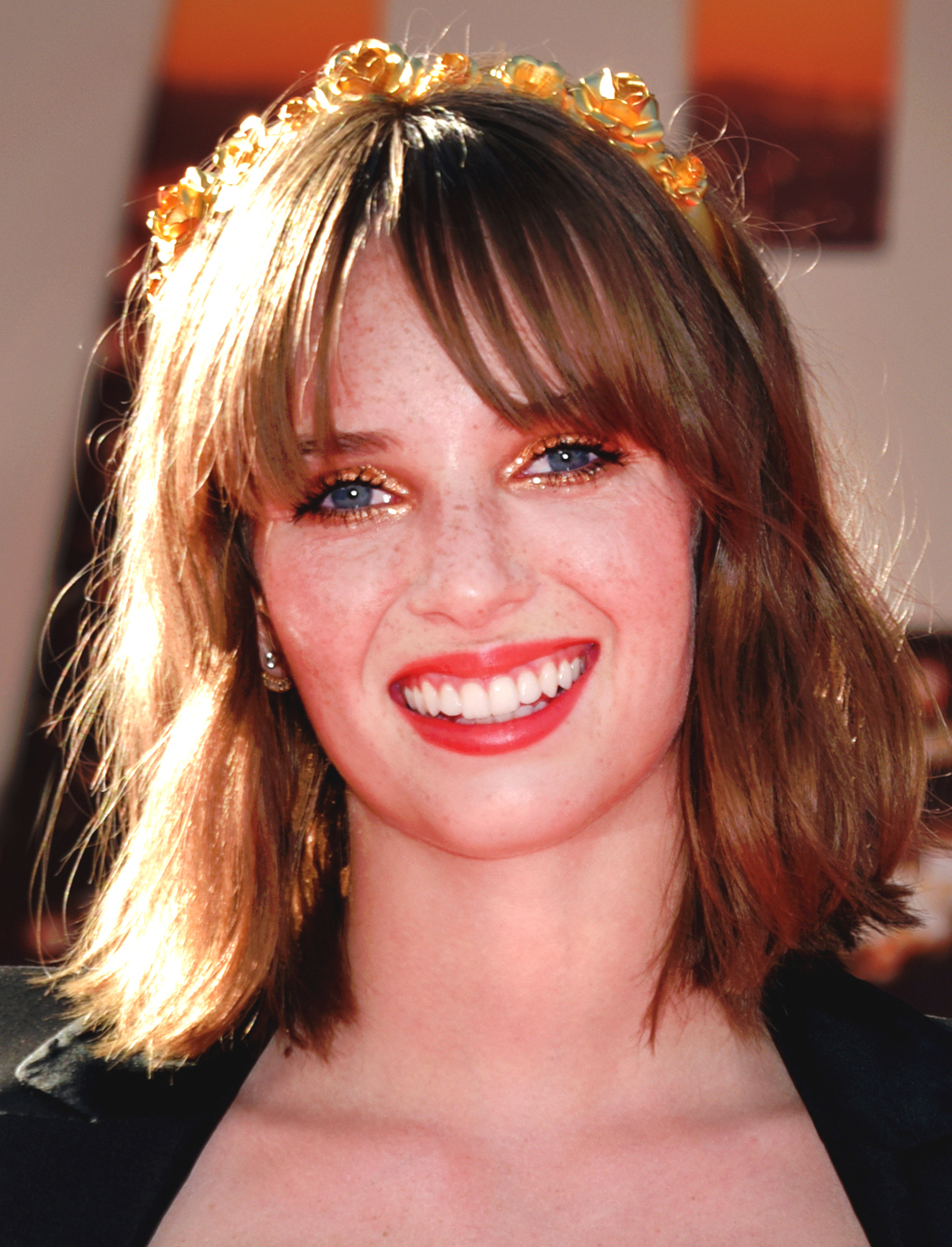
- Kelsey Mann and Maya Hawke received several nominations for his direction and her voice role, respectively
Awards and nominations
Award	Wins	Nominations
AACTA Awards	0	1
Academy Awards	0	1
Alliance of Women Film Journalists Awards	0	4
ACE Eddie Awards	0	1
Annie Awards	0	7
Art Directors Guild Awards	0	1
Artios Awards	0	1
Astra Film Awards	0	4
Astra Midseason Movie Awards	0	1
Austin Film Critics Association Awards	0	2
British Academy Film Awards	0	1
BFE Cut Above Awards	0	1
Black Reel Awards	0	1
Chicago Film Critics Association	0	1
Chicago Indie Critics	0	2
Cinema Audio Society Awards	0	1
Critics' Choice Movie Awards	0	1
Dorian Awards	0	1
Georgia Film Critics Association	0	1
Golden Globe Awards	0	2
Golden Reel Awards	0	1
Golden Trailer Awards	2	4
Hamptons International Film Festival	1	1
Houston Film Critics Society Awards	0	1
Kansas City Film Critics Circle	0	1
London Film Critics' Circle	0	1
NAACP Image Awards	1	2
New York Film Critics Online	0	1
Nickelodeon Kids' Choice Awards	1	3
Online Film Critics Society Awards	0	1
Producers Guild of America Awards	1	1
ReFrame Stamp	1	1
San Francisco Bay Area Film Critics Circle Awards	0	1
Satellite Awards	0	1
Saturn Awards	0	1
Seattle Film Critics Society	0	1
Society of Composers & Lyricists Awards	1	1
St. Louis Film Critics Association	1	3
Visual Effects Society Awards	0	2
Washington D.C. Area Film Critics Association Awards	0	3
Women Film Critics Circle	1	1

Totals (Note: Certain award groups do not simply award one winner. They acknowledge several different recipients, have runners-up, and have third place. Since this is a specific recognition and is different from losing an award, runner-up mentions are considered wins in this award tally. For simplification and to avoid errors, each award in this list has been presumed to have had a prior nomination.)
- Wins: 8
- Nominations: 66

Inside Out 2 is a 2024 American coming-of-age film produced by Pixar Animation Studios and distributed by Walt Disney Studios Motion Pictures. It was directed by Kelsey Mann, with a screenplay by Meg LeFauve and Dave Holstein from a story by Mann and LeFauve, and produced by Mark Nielsen. The film stars the voices of Amy Poehler, Maya Hawke, Kensington Tallman, Liza Lapira, Tony Hale, Lewis Black, Phyllis Smith, Ayo Edebiri, Adèle Exarchopoulos, Diane Lane, Kyle MacLachlan, and Paul Walter Hauser. The film continues Riley's journey as she enters her teenage years, introducing new emotions, such as anxiety, alongside the familiar ones. The film explores how her growing mind balances joy, fear, anger, sadness, and the challenges of adolescence.

Premiered at the El Capitan Theatre in Hollywood, Los Angeles, on June 10, 2024, and was released in the United States on June 14. Inside Out 2 received positive reviews from critics and was a massive box office success grossing $1.699 billion worldwide, breaking multiple box-office records, becoming the highest-grossing film by Pixar and the highest-grossing animated film of all time, though was later overtaken by Ne Zha 2 (2025) in just nine months after its initial release. It also became the highest-grossing film of 2024 and the eighth-highest-grossing film at the time of its release.

The film received nominations for Best Animated Feature at the Golden Globes, Critics' Choice, BAFTAs and Academy Awards. It additionally received a nomination for Cinematic and Box Office Achievement at the Golden Globes.

== Accolades ==
Accolades received by Inside Out 2
Award	Date of ceremony	Category	Recipient(s)	Result	Ref.
AACTA Awards	February 7, 2025	Audience Choice Award for Favourite Film	Inside Out 2	Nominated	
Academy Awards	March 2, 2025	Best Animated Feature	Kelsey Mann and Mark Nielsen	Nominated	
Alliance of Women Film Journalists	January 7, 2025	Best Animated Film	Inside Out 2	Nominated	
Alliance of Women Film Journalists	January 7, 2025	Best Animated/Voice Performance	Ayo Edebiri	Nominated	
Alliance of Women Film Journalists	January 7, 2025	Best Animated/Voice Performance	Maya Hawke	Nominated	
Alliance of Women Film Journalists	January 7, 2025	Best Animated/Voice Performance	Amy Poehler	Nominated	
American Cinema Editors Awards	March 14, 2025	Best Edited Animated Feature Film (Theatrical or Non-Theatrical)	Maurissa Horwitz	Nominated	
Annie Awards	February 8, 2025	Best Animated Feature	Inside Out 2	Nominated	
Annie Awards	February 8, 2025	Outstanding Achievement for Character Animation in an Animated Feature Production	Aviv Mano	Nominated	
Annie Awards	February 8, 2025	Outstanding Achievement for Character Design in an Animated Feature Production	Deanna Marsigliese	Nominated	
Annie Awards	February 8, 2025	Outstanding Achievement for Editorial in an Animated Feature Production	Maurissa Horwitz, David Suther, Fiona Toth, and Jonathan Vargo	Nominated	
Annie Awards	February 8, 2025	Outstanding Achievement for Production Design in an Animated Feature Production	Jason Deamer, Josh West, Keiko Murayama, Bill Zahn, and Laura Meyer	Nominated	
Annie Awards	February 8, 2025	Outstanding Achievement for Voice Acting in an Animated Feature Production	Maya Hawke	Nominated	
Annie Awards	February 8, 2025	Outstanding Achievement for Writing in an Animated Feature Production	Meg LeFauve and Dave Holstein	Nominated	
Art Directors Guild Awards	February 15, 2025	Excellence in Production Design for an Animated Film	Jason Deamer	Nominated	
Artios Awards	February 12, 2025	Outstanding Achievement in Casting - Feature Animation	Natalie Lyon, Kevin Reher, Kate Hansen-Birnbaum and Lexi Diamond	Nominated	
Astra Film Awards	December 8, 2024	Best Animated Feature	Inside Out 2	Nominated	
Astra Film Awards	December 8, 2024	Best Voice Over Performance	Amy Poehler	Nominated	
Astra Film Awards	December 8, 2024	Best Voice Over Performance	Maya Hawke	Nominated	
Astra Film Awards	December 8, 2024	Best First Feature	Kelsey Mann	Nominated	
Astra Midseason Movie Awards	July 3, 2024	Best Picture	Inside Out 2	Nominated	
Austin Film Critics Association	January 6, 2025	Best Animated Film	Inside Out 2	Nominated	
Austin Film Critics Association	January 6, 2025	Best Voice Acting/Animated/Digital Performance	Amy Poehler	Nominated	
British Academy Film Awards	February 16, 2025	Best Animated Film	Inside Out 2	Nominated	
BFE Cut Above Awards	February 13, 2025	Best Edited Single Animation	Maurissa Horwitz	Nominated	
Black Reel Awards	February 17, 2025	Outstanding Voice Performance	Ayo Edebiri	Nominated	
Chicago Film Critics Association	December 12, 2024	Best Animated Film	Inside Out 2	Nominated	
Cinema Audio Society Awards	February 22, 2025	Outstanding Achievement in Sound Mixing for Motion Picture – Animated	Vince Caro, Ren Klyce, Stephen Urata, Warren Brown, Doc Kane, Leff Lefferts	Nominated	
Critics' Choice Awards	February 7, 2025	Best Animated Feature Feature	Inside Out 2	Nominated	
Dorian Awards	July 18, 2025	Animated Film of the Year	Inside Out 2	Nominated	
Florida Film Critics Circle	December 20, 2024	Best Animated Film	Inside Out 2	Nominated	
Georgia Film Critics Association	January 7, 2025	Best Animated Film	Inside Out 2	Nominated	
Golden Globe Award	January 5, 2025	Best Animated Feature Film	Inside Out 2	Nominated	
Golden Globe Award	January 5, 2025	Cinematic and Box Office Achievement	Inside Out 2	Nominated	
Golden Reel Awards	February 23, 2025	Outstanding Achievement in Sound Editing – Feature Animation	Coya Elliott, Ren Klyce, David C. Hughes, Jonathon Stevens, Cheryl Nardi, Dee Selby, Nicholas Docter, Heikki Kossi and Shelley Roden	Nominated	
Golden Trailer Awards	May 31, 2024	Best Animation/Family	"Change"	Nominated	
Golden Trailer Awards	May 29, 2024	Best Animation/Family TV Spot (for a Feature Film)	"Boys" (Disney / Seismic Productions)	Nominated	
Golden Trailer Awards	May 29, 2024	Best Digital – Animation/Family	"Get Ready" (The Walt Disney Studios / Tiny Hero)	Won	
Golden Trailer Awards	May 29, 2024	Best Motion Poster	Inside Out 2 (The Walt Disney Studios / Tiny Hero)	Won	
Hamptons International Film Festival	October 15, 2024	Achievement in Screenwriting Award	Meg LeFauve and Dave Holstein	Won	
Hollywood Music in Media Awards	November 20, 2024	Original Score – Animated Film	Andrea Datzman	Nominated	
Houston Film Critics Society Awards	January 14, 2025	Best Animated Feature	Inside Out 2	Nominated	
Kansas City Film Critics Circle	January 4, 2025	Best Animated Feature	Inside Out 2	Nominated	
London Film Critics' Circle	February 2, 2025	Best Animated Feature	Inside Out 2	Nominated	
NAACP Image Awards	February 22, 2025	Outstanding Animated Motion Picture	Inside Out 2	Won	
NAACP Image Awards	February 22, 2025	Outstanding Character Voice Performance – Motion Picture	Ayo Edebiri	Nominated	
New York Film Critics Online	December 16, 2024	Best Animation	Inside Out 2	Nominated	
Nickelodeon Kids' Choice Awards	June 21, 2025	Favorite Animated Movie	Inside Out 2	Won	
Nickelodeon Kids' Choice Awards	June 21, 2025	Favorite Female Voice from an Animated Movie	Maya Hawke	Nominated	
Nickelodeon Kids' Choice Awards	June 21, 2025	Favorite Female Voice from an Animated Movie	Amy Poehler	Nominated	
Online Film Critics Society Awards	January 27, 2025	Best Animated Feature	Inside Out 2	Nominated	
Producers Guild of America Awards	February 8, 2025	Outstanding Producer of Animated Theatrical Motion Pictures	Mark Nielsen	Nominated	
San Francisco Bay Area Film Critics Circle	December 15, 2024	Best Animated Feature	Inside Out 2	Nominated	
Satellite Awards	January 26, 2025	Best Motion Picture – Animated or Mixed Media	Inside Out 2	Nominated	
Saturn Awards	February 2, 2025	Best Animated Film	Inside Out 2	Nominated	
Seattle Film Critics Society	December 16, 2024	Best Animated Feature	Inside Out 2	Nominated	
Society of Composers & Lyricists Awards	February 12, 2025	David Raksin Award for Emerging Talent	Andrea Datzman	Won	
St. Louis Film Critics Association	December 15, 2024	Best Animated Feature	Inside Out 2	Nominated	
St. Louis Film Critics Association	December 15, 2024	Best Voice Performance	Maya Hawke	Runner-up	
St. Louis Film Critics Association	December 15, 2024	Best Voice Performance	Amy Poehler	Nominated	
Visual Effects Society Awards	February 11, 2025	Outstanding Visual Effects in an Animated Feature	Kelsey Mann, Mark Nielsen, Sudeep Rangaswamy, Bill Watral	Nominated	
Visual Effects Society Awards	February 11, 2025	Outstanding Animated Character in an Animated Feature	Alexander Alvarado, Brianne Francisco, Amanda Wagner, Brenda Lin Zhang (for "Anxiety")	Nominated	
Washington D.C. Area Film Critics Association	December 8, 2024	Best Animated Feature	Inside Out 2	Nominated	
Washington D.C. Area Film Critics Association	December 8, 2024	Best Voice Performance	Maya Hawke	Nominated	
Washington D.C. Area Film Critics Association	December 8, 2024	Best Voice Performance	Amy Poehler	Nominated	
Women Film Critics Circle	January 15, 2025	Best Animated Female	Joy	Runner-up	
