= Joel Green =

Joel Green may refer to:

- Joel B. Green, American New Testament scholar and theologian
- Joel Green (visual effects artist)
