= Richard Kahn (marketing executive) =

American marketing executive

- Born: August 19, 1929; New Rochelle, New York, U.S.
- Died: April 5, 2025 (aged 95); Los Angeles, California, U.S.
- Education: University of Pennsylvania Wharton School
- Occupation: Marketing executive
- Spouse: Marianne Fletcher (died. 2016)

Richard Kahn (August 19, 1929 – April 5, 2025) was an American marketing executive.

== Life and career ==
Kahn was born in New Rochelle, New York, the son of Max Kahn. He attended and graduated from the University of Pennsylvania Wharton School. After graduating, he served as an officer in the United States Navy during the Korean War, which after his discharge, he began his career at Columbia Pictures, advertising and marketing films such as Funny Girl, Lawrence of Arabia, Oliver!, The Guns of Navarone and A Man for All Seasons.

In 1975, Kahn began working at Metro-Goldwyn-Mayer, and later rose up to becoming president of MGM International. From 1983 to 1989, he worked as an adjunct professor in the Peter Stark Motion Picture Producing Program at the USC School of Cinematic Arts. During his years as an adjunct professor, he served as president of the Academy of Motion Picture Arts and Sciences from 1988 to 1989.

In 2000, Kahn was awarded the Key Pioneer Award by the The Hollywood Reporter, "for his creative contributions to the entertainment industry".

== Personal life and death ==
Kahn was married to Marianne Fletcher. Their marriage lasted until Fletcher's death in 2016.

Kahn died on April 5, 2025 in Los Angeles, California, at the age of 95.

At the 98th Academy Awards, his name was mentioned in the In Memoriam section.
