= Russell Bowen =

British-Canadian visual effects artist

- Education: Teesside University
- Occupation: Visual effects artist

Russell Bowen is a British-Canadian visual effects artist. He was nominated for an Academy Award in the category Best Visual Effects for the film The Lost Bus.

== Selected filmography ==
- The Lost Bus (2025; co-nominated with Charlie Noble, David Zaretti and Brandon K. McLaughlin)
