= The Lost Bus =

2025 film by Paul Greengrass

- Promotional poster
- Directed by: Paul Greengrass
- Screenplay by: Brad Ingelsby; Paul Greengrass
- Based on: Paradise by Lizzie Johnson
- Produced by: Jamie Lee Curtis; Jason Blum; Brad Ingelsby; Gregory Goodman
- Starring: Matthew McConaughey; America Ferrera; Yul Vazquez; Ashlie Atkinson
- Cinematography: Pål Ulvik Rokseth
- Edited by: William Goldenberg; Paul Rubell; Peter M. Dudgeon
- Music by: James Newton Howard
- Production companies: Apple Studios; Blumhouse Productions; Comet Pictures
- Distributed by: Apple Original Films
- Release dates: September 5, 2025 (TIFF); September 19, 2025 (United States)
- Running time: 130 minutes
- Country: United States
- Language: English

The Lost Bus is a 2025 American survival drama film directed by Paul Greengrass, who co-wrote the screenplay with Brad Ingelsby based on the 2021 book Paradise by Lizzie Johnson. It stars Matthew McConaughey, America Ferrera, Yul Vazquez and Ashlie Atkinson. It portrays a fictionalized version of the evacuation of schoolchildren during the 2018 Camp Fire in northern California by bus driver Kevin McKay and teacher Mary Ludwig.

The Lost Bus premiered at the Toronto International Film Festival on September 5, 2025, and received a limited theatrical release in the United States on September 19. It began streaming on Apple TV+ on October 3. Critics gave The Lost Bus mostly positive reviews, praising Greengrass for the highly realistic visual effects and strong acting from McConaughey and Ferrera, though some reviewers felt the story was a bit predictable. At the 98th Academy Awards, it was nominated for Best Visual Effects.

== Plot ==
On November 8, 2018, high winds and dry conditions lead a Pacific Gas & Electric transmission line failure to spark the 2018 Camp Fire. Firefighters are unable to contain the blaze from spreading into a massive wildfire, and computer issues interfere with fire chief Ray Martinez's order to evacuate the area.

Kevin McKay, a school bus driver in Paradise, California, struggles to care for his disabled mother Sherry and estranged teenage son Shaun. On the morning of the fire, he is chastised by his boss, transportation director Ruby Bishop, for several delays in returning his bus to the depot for maintenance. Instead, after a tense call with Shaun's mother Linda, Kevin turns back to bring Shaun medication, leaving him the only driver near enough to pick up 22 children stranded at Ponderosa Elementary School in the Paradise evacuation zone.

As the students board the bus, Kevin convinces teacher Mary Ludwig to accompany them, hoping to get home to Sherry and Shaun, neither of whom can drive to evacuate. Traffic and radio issues leave Kevin unable to reach Ruby at the depot, and Chief Martinez tells PG&E to cut the town's power due to evacuees being still in danger from active power lines. Arguing with Mary over the best route, Kevin takes a detour and is left without radio contact after Ruby is forced to evacuate. Trapped in gridlock, Kevin has Mary take the wheel while he assists with directing traffic, allowing the bus and a fire truck through, but they arrive to find their collection point deserted.

Making a plan to reach nearby Chico, Kevin comforts a scared student who, like Shaun, has a difficult relationship with his father. The bus navigates traffic, falling power lines, and armed looters, escaping through the growing blaze onto a side road. With the children suffering from heat and thirst, and the air conditioning shut off to keep out smoke, Mary leaves the bus and retrieves a case of bottled water, narrowly avoiding an exploding propane tank. In Chico, Ruby speaks to the children's parents, expressing her trust in Kevin, while Chief Martinez ceases firefighting operations to focus on saving lives, and makes a public statement about the increasing volume of wildfires.

The bus continues in minimal visibility on treacherous roads, and evacuees fleeing in the opposite direction warn that the terrain ahead is also burning. Finding nowhere to drive or escape on foot, Kevin advises Mary to keep the children on the bus and wait for a change in conditions, as they are forced to breathe through makeshift filters and tape the vents shut. Mary and Kevin discuss their regrets in life, with Mary wishing she spent more time outside of Paradise, and Kevin regretting his fraught relationship with his son. As the raging fire closes in, the bus fails to start, forcing Kevin to make repairs and drive directly through the flames to safety.

Arriving at the evacuation point in Chico, the children are reunited with their families, who applaud Kevin and Mary for their bravery. Ruby and Kevin make amends, and Kevin finds Sherry, who tells him that Shaun is with his mother. As Kevin picks through the wreckage of his destroyed home, Linda arrives with Shaun, who embraces his father. An epilogue reveals that the Camp Fire became the deadliest wildfire in California history; PG&E pled guilty to involuntary manslaughter and paid $13.5 billion in compensation to wildfire victims. Kevin became a teacher in Chico, while Mary continues to teach in Paradise and takes regular trips overseas.

== Cast ==
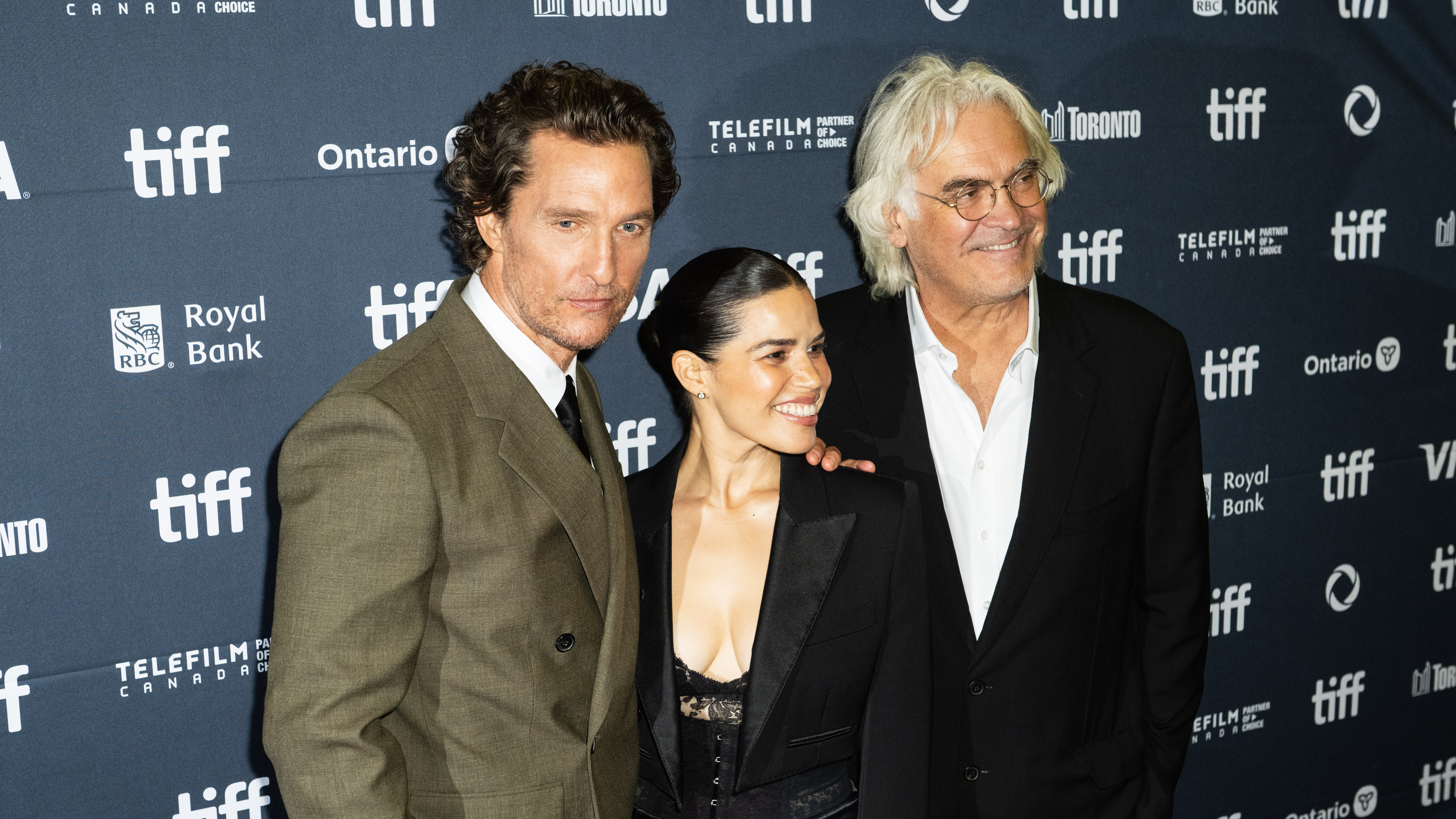
Left to right: McConaughey, Ferrera, and Greengrass at the premiere at the Toronto International Film Festival

- Matthew McConaughey as Kevin McKay, the bus driver
- America Ferrera as Mary Ludwig, the school teacher
- Yul Vazquez as Ray Martinez, CAL FIRE Division chief
- Ashlie Atkinson as Ruby Bishop, Director of Transportation
- Levi McConaughey as Shaun McKay, Kevin's son
- Kay McCabe McConaughey as Sherry McKay, Kevin's disabled mother
- Kate Wharton as Jen Kissoon, CAL FIRE battalion chief
- Danny McCarthy as McKenzie
- Spencer Watson as CAL FIRE Engineer Hopkins
- Nathan Gariety as Levi
- Gary Kraus as Sheriff Thomas

== Production ==
In June 2022, Jamie Lee Curtis for Comet Films and Jason Blum for Blumhouse Productions were developing the film as producers, an adaptation of Lizzie Johnson's book Paradise: One Town's Struggle to Survive an American Wildfire. In January 2024, Paul Greengrass was attached to direct, Matthew McConaughey was set to star, and Apple Inc. entered talks to distribute. In February 2024, America Ferrera joined the cast, and Apple was confirmed to be distributing. In May 2024, Yul Vazquez, Ashlie Atkinson, and Spencer Watson joined the cast.

McConaughey's son, Levi, stars in the film but auditioned without using his last name. The character of Sherry McKay is also played by McConaughey's real-life mother.

Principal photography began on April 1, 2024 in Ruidoso, New Mexico.

== Release ==
The Lost Bus had its world premiere at the 2025 Toronto International Film Festival on September 5, 2025. It was released in select theaters on September 19 and streamed on Apple TV+ on October 3, 2025.

== Reception ==
=== Critical response ===
On the review aggregator website Rotten Tomatoes, 87% of 140 critics' reviews are positive, with an average rating of 6.9/10. The website's consensus reads: "Recreating a real-life disaster with terrifying authenticity, The Lost Bus ratchets up the tension while maintaining a humanist core thanks to Matthew McConaughey and America Ferrera's effective performances." Metacritic, which uses a weighted average, assigned the film a score of 64 out of 100, based on 28 critics, indicating "generally favorable" reviews.

In a review for The Washington Post, Ty Burr described the film as an "effective human drama" while praising the visual effects. Burr, who awarded the movie 2.5 out of 4 stars, also wrote that the visual effects sometimes overpowered the characters. Manohla Dargis of The New York Times gave the movie an unfavorable review, criticizing the dialogue as "formulaic". Donald Clarke of The Irish Times wrote: "Worth catching on its brief theatrical run. Turn it up loud if stuck with the small screen." In a 3 out of 4 review, Lindsey Bahr of the Associated Press wrote: "Perhaps these things really did unfold as they're presented, but at times it feels like you're suddenly on the Universal Studio Tour. Still, it's impossible to take your eyes off the screen." Damon Wise of Deadline Hollywood wrote that the film is much like Greengrass's other films in that it is about "ordinary people in extraordinary circumstances" and calls it a "trip in more than one sense of the word." Peter Bradshaw of The Guardian called it as "a dynamically shot and earnestly performed real-life disaster movie". David Rooney of The Hollywood Reporter wrote: "Bringing his characteristic flair for ramping up tension with handheld cameras and rapid cutting, Greengrass illustrates how easily the combination of lax safety standards and fire-friendly weather can build in what seems like a heartbeat into a mass-casualty event."

Brian Truitt of USA Today wrote: "The Lost Bus is a cathartic quest and character study that works thanks to McConaughey's steeliness and Greengrass' ability to put you on the edge of your seat." Helen O'Hara of Empire wrote: "The fire scenes are terrifying and may well sear themselves into your brain, but however well-intentioned, the human element is less involving than the disaster they must endure." Peter Debruge of Variety wrote: "The whole movie, Greengrass has been giving audiences the wildfire's POV, propelled by high winds and blowing embers in all directions [...] This is presumably the segment audiences will pay to see, and if they're watching on Apple TV+, they can skip straight to this part." Kate Erbland of IndieWire wrote: "For once, zooming in proves to be prohibitive, only in seeing the scope of this mind-bending tragedy does Greengrass truly find his most important story." Caryn James of the BBC wrote: "The Lost Bus doesn't have to bludgeon viewers with a message or with its timely resonance. Greengrass lets us feel it." Katie Doll of Comic Book Resources wrote: "The Lost Bus is an eagle's-eye overview of people coming together as a community, and that in of itself is enough for a sublime movie."

=== Accolades ===
Award	Date of ceremony	Category	Nominee(s)	Result	Ref.
AARP Movies for Grownups Awards	January 10, 2026	Best Intergenerational Film	The Lost Bus	Nominated	
Academy Awards	March 15, 2026	Best Visual Effects	Charlie Noble, David Zaretti, Russell Bowen, and Brandon K. McLaughlin	Nominated	
British Academy Film Awards	February 22, 2026	Best Special Visual Effects	Charlie Noble, Brandon K. McLaughlin, and David Zaretti	Nominated	
Celebration of Latino Cinema and Television	October 24, 2025	Trailblazer Award	America Ferrera	Honored	
Golden Trailer Awards	May 28, 2026	Best Drama	"Miracle" (Apple TV / Requiem)	Nominated	
Golden Trailer Awards	May 28, 2026	Best Drama TV Spot	"Time" (Apple TV / Seismic Productions)	Nominated	
Imagen Awards	August 21, 2026	Best Actress	America Ferrera	Nominated	
Visual Effects Society Awards	February 25, 2026	Outstanding Visual Effects in a Photoreal Feature	Charlie Noble, Gavin Round, David Zaretti, Russell Bowen, and Brandon K. McLaughlin	Nominated	
Visual Effects Society Awards	February 25, 2026	Outstanding Environment in a Photoreal Feature	Jamie Haydock, Francesco Ferraresi, Sergei Konorev, and Frederick Vallee (for "The Wildfires of Roe Road")	Nominated	
Visual Effects Society Awards	February 25, 2026	Outstanding Environment in a Photoreal Feature	David Schulz, Mareike Loges, Björn Markgraf, and Philipp Hafellner (for "Feather River Canyon by the Pulga Bridge")	Nominated	
Visual Effects Society Awards	February 25, 2026	Outstanding Effects Simulations in a Photoreal Feature	Billy Copley, Mathieu Chardonnet, Chetan Patkar, and David Schott (for "Escape from Hell")	Nominated	
