= Retirement Plan =

2024 Irish animated short film

- Directed by: John Kelly
- Written by: John Kelly; Tara Lawall
- Produced by: Andrew Freedman; Julie Murnaghan
- Starring: Domhnall Gleeson
- Release date: 2024
- Running time: 7 minutes
- Country: Ireland
- Language: English

Retirement Plan is a 2024 Irish animated short film directed by John Kelly and co-written by John Kelly and Tara Lawall. The 7-minute animated film about the fantasies of a middle-aged man has been awarded in various international film festivals, including Palm Spring International ShortFest and SXSW Festival.

The film's style, which has been described as expressively understated, subdued and stripped-back, was animated using Moho animation software.

The film was nominated for Best Animated Short Film at the 98th Academy Awards.

== Plot ==
Overwhelmed by his life, middle-aged man Ray dreams about his retirement, planning everything he'd like to do once he finally has time for himself.

== Accolades ==
Since its release, the film has been selected for various festivals around the world and the Oscars:

Year	Festivals	Award/Category	Status
2024	Galway Film Fleadh	Best Animated Short	Nominated
2025	SXSW	Grand Jury Award	Won
2025	SXSW	Audience Award	Won
2025	Palm Spring International ShortFest	Best of the Festival Award	Won
2025	Indy Shorts International Film Fest	Best Animated Short	Won
2025	HollyShorts Film Festival	Best Animated Short	Nominated
2025	Bali International Film Festival	Best Animated Short	Won
2025	Foyle Film Festival	Best Animated Short Film	Won
2025	Academy Awards	Best Animated Short	Nominated

== See also ==
- List of submissions for the Academy Award for Best Animated Short Film
