= A Friend of Dorothy =

2025 British short film

- Promotional poster
- Directed by: Lee Knight
- Written by: Lee Knight
- Produced by: James Dean; Scottie Fotré; Max Marlow
- Starring: Miriam Margolyes; Stephen Fry; Alistair Nwachukwu; Oscar Lloyd
- Cinematography: Vanessa Whyte
- Edited by: Phil Hookway
- Music by: Stuart Hancock
- Production companies: Filthy Gorgeous Productions; A Marlow's Production; Double Dice Films; Namesake Films
- Release date: 25 June 2025 (Raindance)
- Running time: 21 minutes
- Country: United Kingdom
- Language: English

A Friend of Dorothy is a 2025 British short comedy drama film written and directed by Lee Knight. The film starring Miriam Margolyes as a lonely widow and Alistair Nwachukwu as a teenage neighbour, depicts an unlikely, poignant bond over shared loneliness.

It had its premiere in Shorts films at the Raindance Film Festival on 25 June 2025.

It was nominated for the Best Live Action Short Film at the 98th Academy Awards.

== Summary ==
Dorothy, an 87-year-old widow whose health is declining but whose mind remains sharp, lives a quiet and solitary life; her son has moved to the other side of the world and rarely contacts her, and her grandson Scott is distant and patronizing. Her routine is unexpectedly disrupted when 17‑year‑old JJ sends a football into her garden. Dorothy permits him to retrieve the ball on the condition that he help her open a can of her prunes.

While waiting for her to locate her keys, JJ becomes curious in her library of plays, and their ensuing conversation reveals that JJ is interested in becoming an actor, and Dorothy and her late husband had financially supported local theaters and prospective drama students. After JJ moves her with a reading from The Inheritance, Dorothy proposes that he come over daily to assist her and practice his acting, and the two gradually form a meaningful friendship.

After Dorothy passes away, JJ is summoned to the reading of her will, where it is revealed that Dorothy left him her entire collection of plays. Hidden in a copy of a book is a cheque for £50,000, and a note of encouragement from Dorothy to pursue his dream of acting and attend the Royal Academy of Dramatic Art.

== Cast ==
- Miriam Margolyes as Dorothy Woodley
- Stephen Fry as Dickie
- Alistair Nwachukwu as JJ
- Oscar Lloyd as Scott Woodley

== Release ==
A Friend of Dorothy premiered at the Raindance Film Festival on 25 June 2025. It was also presented at the Opening Night of the Naples International Film Festival on 23 October 2025, the Coronado Island Film Festival on 9 November 2025, and HollyShorts London in November 2025.

== Accolades ==
Award	Date of ceremony	Category	Recipient(s)	Result	Ref.
Raindance Film Festival	27 June 2025	Best UK Short Film	A Friend of Dorothy	Nominated	
Odense International Film Festival	31 August 2025	Audience Award	A Friend of Dorothy	Won	
New Renaissance Film Festival	28 September 2025	Emerging Talent Award	A Friend of Dorothy	Won	
HollyShorts Film Festival	17 November 2025	Best Drama Presented by Le Kool Champagne	A Friend of Dorothy	Won	
Academy Awards	15 March 2026	Best Live Action Short Film	A Friend of Dorothy	Nominated	

== See also ==
- Academy Award for Best Documentary Short Film
- Submissions for Best Documentary Short Academy Award
- Academy Award for Best Live Action Short Film
- 98th Academy Awards
