= Jane Austen's Period Drama =

2024 American short film

- Promotional poster
- Spanish: El drama de época de Jane Austen
- Directed by: Julia Aks; Steve Pinder
- Written by: Julia Aks; Steve Pinder
- Produced by: Elli Legerski
- Starring: Julia Aks; Hugo Armstrong; Marilyn Brett; Dustin Ingram
- Cinematography: Luca Del Puppo
- Edited by: Julia Aks; Steve Pinder
- Music by: Alex Winkler
- Distributed by: Ouat Media
- Release date: February 9, 2024 (Santa Barbara)
- Running time: 13 minutes
- Country: United States
- Language: English

Jane Austen's Period Drama is a 2024 English-language short comedy film written and directed by Julia Aks and Steve Pinder. The film is a satire on Jane Austen's Pride and Prejudice.

The film had its world premiere at the 39th Santa Barbara International Film Festival on February 9, 2024.

It was nominated for the Best Live Action Short Film at the 98th Academy Awards.

== Summary ==
In 1813 England, Miss Estrogenia Talbot receives a long-anticipated marriage proposal from her suitor, Mr. Dickley; during the proposal, however, she unexpectedly starts menstruating, and Mr. Dickley misinterprets the visible blood as a serious injury and carries her to her home before she can explain. After he leaves to fetch a doctor, Estrogenia's sisters, Labinia and Vagianna, encourage a reluctant Estrogenia to play into Mr. Dickley's mistake and feign injury to secure the proposal instead of scaring him off, with Labinia warning her that honesty about menstruation will repulse Mr. Dickley. When Mr. Dickley returns, Estrogenia orders them out so that she can talk to him privately.

To the horror of her eavesdropping family, Estrogenia informs Mr. Dickley of the misconception and, since he is unaware of the concept of menstruation, delves into an informative and straightforward explanation of the details and process. Mr. Dickley is shocked by certain details, but is ultimately absorbed and even takes notes and asks questions during the lecture. Though Estrogenia fears that he will be too uncomfortable to remain interested in her, Mr. Dickley assures her that he loves her and will happily support her through her periods, and finally successfully proposes. As the household bursts in to celebrate, a handsome doctor, Dr. Bangley, arrives, and an intrigued Labinia seizes the opportunity to flirt with him.

In a mid-credits scene, a thrilled Mr. Dickley explains to Estrogenia that he told his mother about her -- including discussing menstruation, specifically diarrhea during menstruation that Estrogenia had mentioned, much to her dismay.

== Cast ==
- Julia Aks as Miss Estrogenia Talbot
- Samantha Smart as Miss Labinia Talbot
- Ta'imua as Mr. James Dickley
- Hugo Armstrong as Mr. Father Talbot
- Marilyn Brett as Mrs. Bitts
- Dustin Ingram as Dr. Bangley
- Nicole Alyse Nelson as Miss Vagianna Talbot

== Production ==
Co-writers and directors Aks and Pinder initially conceived the project as a three-minute sketch inspired by the pun in the title and their shared background in sketch comedy and highbrow–lowbrow humor. While researching material for the sketch, Aks solicited personal menstruation stories from a private Facebook group for female opera singers. The response was large and varied, ranging from humorous anecdotes to deeply personal accounts involving healthcare access, partner misunderstandings, and reproductive health stigma. These responses led the filmmakers to expand the concept beyond a sketch into a narrative short film.

In November 2025, British actress Emma Thompson joined the project under the title of "Executive Menstrual Advisor". Thompson declined a traditional executive producer credit, stating that she preferred not to take a producer title unless she had been directly involved in production.

== Release ==
Jane Austen's Period Drama had its world premiere at the 39th Santa Barbara International Film Festival on February 9, 2024.

The film was presented in the Live Shorts section of the 2024 Palm Springs International ShortFest in June 2024, it also had its New York premiere at the Tribeca Film Festival in June 2024.

The film was showcased in the 2024 Cordillera International Film Festival on 27 September 2024 in Movies in the Ballpark - Shorts Program #5 - Blended Block.

The film was presented in 34th Edition Shortsfest: Program 1 at the Aspen Shortsfest on March 31, 2025.

The film was presented in Shorts at the Maryland Film Festival on November 6, 2025.

== Reception ==
=== Critical Reviews ===
In a review for Film Threat, Alan Ng wrote that Jane Austen's Period Drama successfully applies the conventions of a Jane Austen–inspired narrative to contemporary subject matter. Ng commented on the film's visual presentation, noting its period setting, lighting, and costuming, and described the performances as committed to the material. He also highlighted the film's narrative structure, stating that the screenplay sustains its comedic premise through to the conclusion while addressing menstrual stigma through humor.

In a review for UK Film Reviews, Joe Beck described Jane Austen's Period Drama as a satirical homage to Jane Austen that blends period conventions with contemporary themes surrounding menstruation. Beck noted the film's use of wordplay and heightened performances, and highlighted the chemistry between Julia Aks and Lachlan Ta'imua Hannemann, as well as the filmmakers' use of verbal and physical comedy. Carter Smith, in the Leicestershire Press, noted the writers' love of puns, with the script dotted with names "a group of 12-year-olds might come up with in the playground after a sex-ed lesson", but hailed the film a success.

=== Accolades ===
At the 2025 Aspen Shortsfest, Jane Austen’s Period Drama won the Comedy Jury Award, which qualified the film for consideration in the Academy Award for Best Live Action Short Film. In its jury statement, Aspen Shortsfest cited the film's "commitment to its concept" and its integration of multiple comedic elements across production disciplines.

Award	Date of ceremony	Category	Recipient(s)	Result	Ref.
Cleveland International Film Festival	April 13, 2024	Audience Choice Award for Best Overall Short	Jane Austen's Period Drama	Won	
Cleveland International Film Festival	April 13, 2024	Best Live-Action Short Jury Award	Jane Austen's Period Drama	Runner-up	
Indy Shorts International Film Festival	July 29, 2024	Overall Audience Choice Award	Jane Austen's Period Drama	Won	
Indy Shorts International Film Festival	July 29, 2024	Comedy Award	Jane Austen's Period Drama	Won	
Hamptons International Film Festival	October 14, 2024	The Peter Macgregor-Scott Memorial Award	Jane Austen's Period Drama	Won	
Santa Fe International Film Festival	October 20, 2024	Audience Choice Award	Jane Austen's Period Drama	Won	
Sonoma International Film Festival	March 23, 2025	The McNeely Award for Best Short Film	Jane Austen's Period Drama	Won	
Aspen Shortsfest	April 5, 2025	Jury Award for Comedy	Jane Austen's Period Drama	Won	
Emberlight International Film Festival	August 22, 2025	Best Narrative Short	Jane Austen's Period Drama	Won	
Academy Awards	March 15, 2026	Best Live Action Short Film	Jane Austen's Period Drama	Nominated	

== See also ==
- Academy Award for Best Live Action Short Film
- 98th Academy Awards
