= David Zaretti =

British visual effects artist

- Occupation: Visual effects artist

David Zaretti is a British visual effects artist. He was nominated for an Academy Award in the category Best Visual Effects for the film The Lost Bus.

In addition to his Academy Award nomination, he was nominated for a Primetime Emmy Award in the category Outstanding Special Visual Effects for his work on the television program Altered Carbon. His nomination was shared with Everett Burrell, Tony Meagher, Joel Whist, Jorge Del Valle, Steve Moncur, Christine Lemon, Paul Jones and Antoine Monineau.

== Selected filmography ==
- The Lost Bus (2025; co-nominated with Charlie Noble, Russell Bowen and Brandon K. McLaughlin)
