= Charlie Noble (visual effects artist) =

British visual effects artist

- Occupation: Visual effects artist

Charlie Noble is a British visual effects artist. He was nominated for two Academy Awards in the category Best Visual Effects for the films No Time to Die and The Lost Bus.

== Selected filmography ==
- No Time to Die (2021; co-nominated with Joel Green, Jonathan Fawkner and Chris Corbould)
- The Lost Bus (2025; co-nominated with David Zaretti, Russell Bowen and Brandon K. McLaughlin)
