= Joel Green (visual effects artist) =

British visual effects artist

- Occupation: Visual effects artist

Joel Green is a British visual effects artist. He was nominated for an Academy Award in the category Best Visual Effects for the film No Time to Die.

== Selected filmography ==
- No Time to Die (2021; co-nominated with Charlie Noble, Jonathan Fawkner and Chris Corbould)
