= Thomas Foldberg =

Danish make-up artist

- Born: 8 September 1977 (age 48); Copenhagen, Denmark
- Occupation: Make-up artist

Thomas Foldberg (born 8 September 1977) is a Danish make-up artist. He was nominated for an Academy Award in the category Best Makeup and Hairstyling for the film The Ugly Stepsister.

In addition to his Academy Award nomination, he won four Robert Awards and was nominated for eight more in the categories Best Makeup and Best Visual Effects.

== Selected filmography ==
- The Ugly Stepsister (2025; co-nominated with Anne Cathrine Sauerberg)
