= Brandon K. McLaughlin =

American special effects artist

- Occupation: Special effects artist

Brandon K. McLaughlin is an American special effects artist. He was nominated for an Academy Award in the category Best Visual Effects for the film The Lost Bus.

== Selected filmography ==
- The Lost Bus (2025; co-nominated with Charlie Noble, David Zaretti and Russell Bowen)
