= Anne Cathrine Sauerberg =

Danish make-up artist

- Born: Frederiksberg, Denmark
- Occupation: Make-up artist

Anne Cathrine Sauerberg is a Danish make-up artist. She was nominated for an Academy Award in the category Best Makeup and Hairstyling for the film The Ugly Stepsister.

== Selected filmography ==
- The Ugly Stepsister (2025; co-nominated with Thomas Foldberg)
