= Jordan Samuel =

Canadian make-up artist

- Occupation: Make-up artist

Jordan Samuel is a Canadian make-up artist. He won an Academy Award in the category Best Makeup and Hairstyling for the film Frankenstein.

In addition to his Academy Award nomination, he won a Primetime Emmy Award and was nominated for one more in the category Outstanding Makeup for his work on the television programs The Kennedys and The Secret Life of Marilyn Monroe.

== Selected filmography ==
- Frankenstein (2025; co-won with Mike Hill and Cliona Furey)
