= Mike Hill (make-up artist) =

British make-up artist and sculptor

- Born: 1969 or 1970 (age 56–57); Warrington, Cheshire, England
- Occupations: Make-up artist, sculptor

Mike Hill (born 1969/1970) is a British make-up artist and sculptor. He won an Academy Award in the category Best Makeup and Hairstyling for the film Frankenstein.

In addition to his Academy Award win, he was nominated for a Primetime Emmy Award in the category Outstanding Prosthetic Makeup for his work on the television program Guillermo del Toro's Cabinet of Curiosities. His nomination was shared with Sean Samson, Shane Zander, Kyle Glencross and Megan Many.

== Early life ==
Hill was born in Warrington, Cheshire. At the age of five, he had an interest on science fiction horror films, and would collect clay from the river and canal near his home to create clay models and monsters.

== Selected filmography ==
- Frankenstein (2025; co-won with Jordan Samuel and Cliona Furey)
