= Seismic Productions =

- Company type: Private
- Industry: Entertainment
- Founded: 1989
- Headquarters: Hollywood, California
- Key people: David Schneiderman, Erin Wyatt
- Website: www.seismicproductions.com

Seismic Productions is a Los Angeles based creative marketing company that creates trailers, television spots, and other marketing tools for the entertainment industry.

== History ==
Seismic Productions was founded in 1989 under the co-ownership of David Schneiderman and Kevin Sewelson. Schneiderman initially began his career at J. Walter Thompson advertising agency in New York before moving out west to work for Disney in 1986. Sewelson began his career as a trailer editor working primarily with New World Pictures between 1985 and 1988. In 1998, Erin Wyatt joined the company, and after a few years was working as an editor. In 2010, Wyatt was made a partner, and in 2011 Sewelson exited Seismic, leaving Schneiderman and Wyatt as the remaining partners.

Since its founding, the company has expanded from its roots in independent cinema (Fargo, The Crying Game, Four Weddings and a Funeral) to larger commercial projects, including the critically acclaimed campaigns for The Devil Wears Prada, Les Misérables,Step Brothers, and Brokeback Mountain, the latter of which was later parodied in its entirety on Saturday Night Live. The company has since moved into exploring social media marketing and creative content for companies such as Netflix and Amazon.

== Recent awards ==
Seismic Productions has garnered dozens of nominations and awards, including two Clio Awards for their work on American Sniper and American Ultra, and numerous Golden Trailer Awards, including the Best Drama TV Spot Award for American Sniper.

In November 2016, Seismic's trailer for Beauty and the Beast broke the record for most views in 24 hours with 127.6 million views.
