= Cliona Furey =

Canadian hairstylist

- Occupation: Hairstylist

Cliona Furey is a Canadian hairstylist. She won an Academy Award in the category Best Makeup and Hairstyling for the film Frankenstein.

In addition to her Academy Award nomination, she was nominated for a Primetime Emmy Award in the category Outstanding Hairstyling for her work on the television program The Secret Life of Marilyn Monroe. Her nomination was shared with Cathy Shibley, Jacqueline Robertson Cull and Vincent Sullivan.

== Selected filmography ==
- Frankenstein (2025; co-won with Mike Hill and Jordan Samuel)
