= F1 the Album =

Soundtrack album by various artists
- Released: June 27, 2025
- Length: 50:29
- Labels: Atlantic; Apple
- Producers: Blake Slatkin; Burns; Chris Stapleton; D.A. Got That Dope; Dave Cobb; Dom Dolla; El Guincho; Grant Boutin; Hans Zimmer; John Mayer; Joshua Moszi; Karma Kid; Kel-P; Kooldrink; Lostboy; Mark Ronson; Mr Eazi; Oscar; Peggy Gou; RetroVision; Ryan Tedder; Tiësto; Tyler Spry

F1 the Movie (Original Score)

Singles from F1 the Album
- 1. "Lose My Mind" Released: April 30, 2025; 2. "Messy" Released: May 8, 2025; 3. "Baja California" Released: May 23, 2025; 4. "Just Keep Watching" Released: May 30, 2025; 5. "Drive" Released: June 20, 2025; 6. "Don't Let Me Drown" Released: June 27, 2025

F1 the Album is the soundtrack album for the 2025 film F1, directed by Joseph Kosinski. It was released by Atlantic Records and Apple Video Programming on June 27, 2025, the same day as the film's North American theatrical release. The soundtrack contains songs by Don Toliver, Doja Cat, Dom Dolla, Nathan Nicholson, Ed Sheeran, Tate McRae, Rosé, Burna Boy, Roddy Ricch, Raye, Chris Stapleton, Myke Towers, Tiësto, Sexyy Red, Madison Beer, Peggy Gou, PAWSA, Mr Eazi, Darkoo, and Obongjayar. German film score composer and music producer Hans Zimmer composed the score of the movie, which combines orchestral and electronic music.

== Background and release ==
F1 the Album was produced and overseen by Atlantic Records West Coast President Kevin Weaver, along with Atlantic's Brandon Davis and Joseph Khoury. On April 30, 2025, American rappers Don Toliver and Doja Cat released the song "Lose My Mind" and its accompanying music video as the first single from the soundtrack album. The following day, Atlantic Records revealed the lineup of artists involved on the 17-track album, including Ed Sheeran, Rosé, Tate McRae, Raye, Burna Boy, Roddy Ricch, Dom Dolla, Chris Stapleton, Tiësto, Sexyy Red, Myke Towers, Madison Beer, Peggy Gou and more.

The full track listing was also released and the album was made available to pre-order on digital platforms as well as in CD, cassette, and vinyl LP formats. The record was promoted at the 2025 Miami Grand Prix with an immersive experience recreating the garage of the film's fictional racing team APXGP. On May 8, Rosé released "Messy" as the second single from the soundtrack album. On May 16, the label issued "No Room for a Saint" by Dom Dolla as a promotional single. On May 23, "Baja California" by Towers was released as the soundtrack's third single. On the same date, Stapleton's "Bad as I Used to Be" was released as a promotional single. One week later, "Just Keep Watching" performed by McRae, was released as the album's fourth single. On June 6, Tiësto and Sexyy Red's collaboration, titled "OMG!", was released as a promotional single. "Underdog" by Roddy Ricch was released as a promotional single on June 12, 2025. On June 20, "Drive" by Sheeran was released as the fifth official single. On June 24, "D.A.N.C.E" by Peggy Gou was released as a promotional single. On June 27, the sixth official single "Don't Let Me Drown" by Burna Boy was released.

== Critical reception ==
In a four-star review, Rolling Stone favourably labelled the soundtrack album a "thrilling listen" that "brings back the era of the blockbuster soundtrack while making its case for the soundtrack of summer". Filmtracks dubbed the film's cinematic score "a simplistic, repetitive, and mindless score that will appeal to listeners who don't fuss hearing [Zimmer] pound away in his trashiest masculine mode".

== Accolades ==
Awards and nominations for F1 the Album
Organisation	Year	Category	Result	Ref.
American Music Awards	2026	Best Soundtrack	Nominated	
Grammy Awards	2026	Best Compilation Soundtrack for Visual Media	Nominated	
Hollywood Music In Media Awards	2025	Soundtrack Album	Won	
iHeartRadio Music Awards	2026	Favorite Soundtrack	Nominated	
RTHK International Pop Poll Awards	2025	Top Soundtrack Album	Won	

== Track listing ==
F1 the Album track listing
No.	Title	Writer(s)	Producer(s)	Length
1.	"Lose My Mind" (Don Toliver featuring Doja Cat)	Caleb Toliver; Amala Dlamini; Hans Zimmer; Ryan Tedder; Grant Boutin	Zimmer; Tedder; Boutin	3:29
2.	"No Room for a Saint" (Dom Dolla featuring Nathan Nicholson)	Dominic Matheson; Nathan Nicholson; Toby Le Messuier	Dom Dolla	3:56
3.	"Drive" (Ed Sheeran)	Sheeran; Blake Slatkin; John Mayer	Slatkin; Mayer	3:07
4.	"Just Keep Watching" (Tate McRae)	McRae; Tedder; Tyler Spry	Tedder; Spry	2:22
5.	"Messy" (Rosé)	Chae Young Park; Cleo Tighe; Delacey; Peter Rycroft; Matthew James Burns	Lostboy; Burns	2:58
6.	"Don't Let Me Drown" (Burna Boy)	Damini Ogulu; Asia Smith; Calvin Tarvin; Kevin Yancy; Munashe Kugarakuripi; Shae Jacobs	Kooldrink	3:05
7.	"Underdog" (Roddy Ricch)	Rodrick Moore Jr.; David Doman; Israel Houghton II; Adrienne Byrne; Keith Parker	D.A. Got That Dope; Terrace Martin^{[a]}	2:22
8.	"Grandma Calls the Boy Bad News" (Raye)	Rachel Keen; Mark Ronson; Christopher Braun; Homer Steinweiss; Nick Movshon; Victor Axelrod	Ronson	3:26
9.	"Bad as I Used to Be" (Chris Stapleton)	Stapleton	Stapleton; Dave Cobb	5:00
10.	"Baja California" (Myke Towers)	Michael Torres; Pablo Diaz-Reixa; Oscar Adler; James E. Alexander; Ben Cauley; Allen Jones; John R Smith; Andres Vargas-Titus; William McLean	El Guincho; Oscar	2:24
11.	"OMG!" (Tiësto and Sexyy Red)	Tijs Verwest; Janae Wherry; Mathieu Arnaud; Mila Falls; Reece Pullinger	Tiësto; RetroVision; Spry^{[a]}	2:33
12.	"All At Once" (Madison Beer)	Beer; Rycroft; Lucy Healey; Leroy Clampitt	Lostboy	2:34
13.	"D.A.N.C.E" (Peggy Gou)	Kim Min-Ji	Peggy Gou	3:15
14.	"Double C" (PAWSA)	David Esekhile	PAWSA	3:46
15.	"Attention" (Mr Eazi)	Oluwatosin Ajibade; Udoma Amba; Joshua Nkansah	Mr Eazi; Kel-P; Joshua Moszi	2:53
16.	"Give Me Love" (Darkoo)	Oluwafisayo Isa; Ekeh Joseph; Samuel Awuku	Sammy Soso	2:20
17.	"Gasoline" (Obongjayar)	Steven Umoh; Samuel Knowles	Karma Kid	3:39
Total length:				50:29

Cinematic edition – score by Hans Zimmer
No.	Title	Length
18.	"F1"	3:13
19.	"Anything You Wish You'd Done Differently?"	2:10
20.	"Run for the Podium"	6:32
21.	"Road to Recovery"	3:29
22.	"Built for Combat"	3:05
23.	"Drive Fast"	6:17
24.	"Tell Me About Kate"	1:34
25.	"Keep It in One Piece"	2:57
26.	"No One Drives Forever"	6:05
27.	"Lining Up on the Grid"	2:10
28.	"It's All Just Noise"	4:00
29.	"Elbows Out"	7:28
30.	"Red Flag"	4:02
31.	"Three Laps Is a Lifetime"	5:33
32.	"See You Down the Road"	2:51
Total length:		111:54

Samples

- "Baja California" contains samples of "The Choice Is Yours (Revisited)", written and performed by Black Sheep, which itself samples "Big Sur Suite" by Johnny "Hammond" Smith, "Impressions" by McCoy Tyner, "I'll Say It Again" by Sweet Linda Divine, "Keep on Doin' It" by New Birth, and "Engine Engine #9" by Roger Miller.

Notes

- ^{[a]} signifies an additional producer

== Charts ==
=== Weekly charts ===
Weekly chart performance for F1 the Album
Chart (2025)	Peak position
Australian Albums (ARIA)	19
Austrian Albums (Ö3 Austria)	16
Belgian Albums (Ultratop Flanders)	47
Belgian Albums (Ultratop Wallonia)	32
Canadian Albums (Billboard)	6
Croatian International Albums (HDU)	2
Czech Albums (ČNS IFPI)	21
Dutch Albums (Album Top 100)	57
French Albums (SNEP)	19
German Albums (Offizielle Top 100)	45
Hungarian Albums (MAHASZ)	3
Irish Compilation Albums (IRMA)	2
Japanese Albums (Oricon)	42
Japanese Combined Albums (Oricon)	29
Japanese Hot Albums (Billboard Japan)	12
New Zealand Albums (RMNZ)	9
Nigerian Albums (TurnTable)	26
Polish Albums (ZPAV)	58
Portuguese Albums (AFP)	160
Spanish Albums (Promusicae)	95
Swiss Albums (Schweizer Hitparade)	21
UK Compilation Albums (Official Charts)	2
US Billboard 200	13
US Top Soundtracks (Billboard)	2

Chart performance for F1 the Movie (Original Score by Hans Zimmer)
Chart (2025)	Peak position
UK Soundtrack Albums (Official Charts)	34

=== Year-end charts ===
Year-end chart performance for F1 the Album
Chart (2025)	Position
Croatian International Albums (HDU)	38
French Albums (SNEP)	179
US Top Soundtracks (Billboard)	13

== Certifications ==
Region	Certification	Certified units/sales
New Zealand (RMNZ)	Gold	7,500^{‡}
^{‡} Sales+streaming figures based on certification alone.

== Release history ==
Release history and formats for F1 the Album
Region	Date	Format(s)	Label(s)	Ref.
Various	June 27, 2025	CD; vinyl LP; cassette; digital download; streaming	Atlantic; Apple	
