= Peggy Gou =

South Korean DJ and record producer (born 1991)

Peggy Gou 페기 구
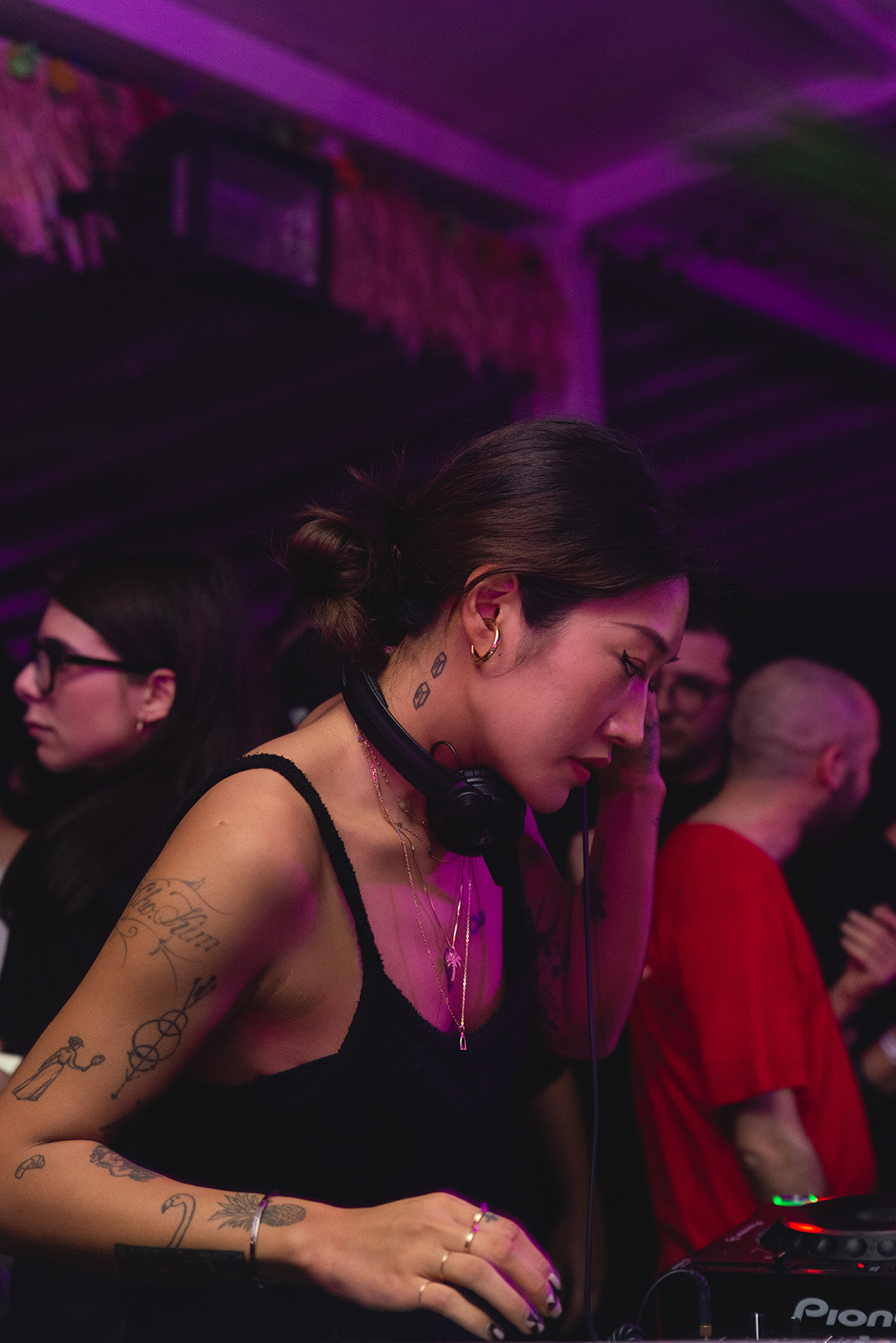
- Gou at Deep 'n Morning Carnival in Naples, March 2019

Background information
- Born: Kim Min-ji (김민지); 3 July 1991 (age 35); Incheon, South Korea
- Genres: Deep house; dance; minimal trance; electronic; house; tech house
- Occupations: DJ; singer; songwriter; record producer; fashion designer
- Instruments: Vocals; keyboards; sampler; drum machine; turntables; gayageum
- Years active: 2014–present
- Labels: Ninja Tune; Phonica; Gudu Records; XL
- Website: peggygou.com

Korean name
- Hangul: 김민지
- RR: Gim Minji
- MR: Kim Minji

Kim Min-ji (Korean: 김민지; born 3 July 1991), known as Peggy Gou (/ˌpɛɡi ˈɡuː/ PEG-ee GOO; 페기 구), is a South Korean DJ, singer, songwriter, fashion designer, and record producer based in Berlin, Germany. She has released seven EPs on record labels including Ninja Tune and Phonica. In 2019, she launched her own independent record label named Gudu Records, and released a DJ-Kicks compilation titled DJ-Kicks: Peggy Gou, through !k7 Records. Her debut album, I Hear You, was released on 7 June 2024 through XL Recordings.

== Early life and education ==
Peggy Gou was born Kim Min-ji in Incheon, South Korea, on 3 July 1991. Her father, Kim Chang-yong, a former journalist, is a professor of mass communication at Inje University and standing commissioner of the Korea Communications Commission.

Gou began classical piano lessons at age eight. At age 14, her parents sent her to London to study English in the UK. She moved back to Korea when she was 18 years old, but six months later she returned to London to study fashion at the London College of Fashion. After graduating, she worked as the London correspondent editor for Harper's Bazaar Korea, and then moved to Berlin, Germany.

== Career ==
Gou was taught to DJ in 2009 by a friend from Korea. She had her first gig in Cirque Le Soir, Soho, and later performed weekly at The Book Club, East London. In 2013, she learned to use Ableton Live and began to create her own tracks. Her first track, "Hungboo", was completed in 2014. "Hungboo" was named for the hero of a Korean fairy tale. She played the track in Korea for the first time at the 2016 Style Icon Awards opening show, featuring award-winning actor Yoo Ah-in in a visual art video.

Gou made her recording debut in January 2016 on Radio Slave's Rekids label with The Art of War Part 1, featuring a remix from Galcher Lustwerk. She next released four EPs including Seek for Maktoop, with hit track "It Makes You Forget (Itgehane)". Maktoop was named after the Arabic word "maktoob", the equivalent to "written" or "destiny". This was followed by the EPs Once in 2018, and Moment in April 2019. Once is the first time she has sung on a record.

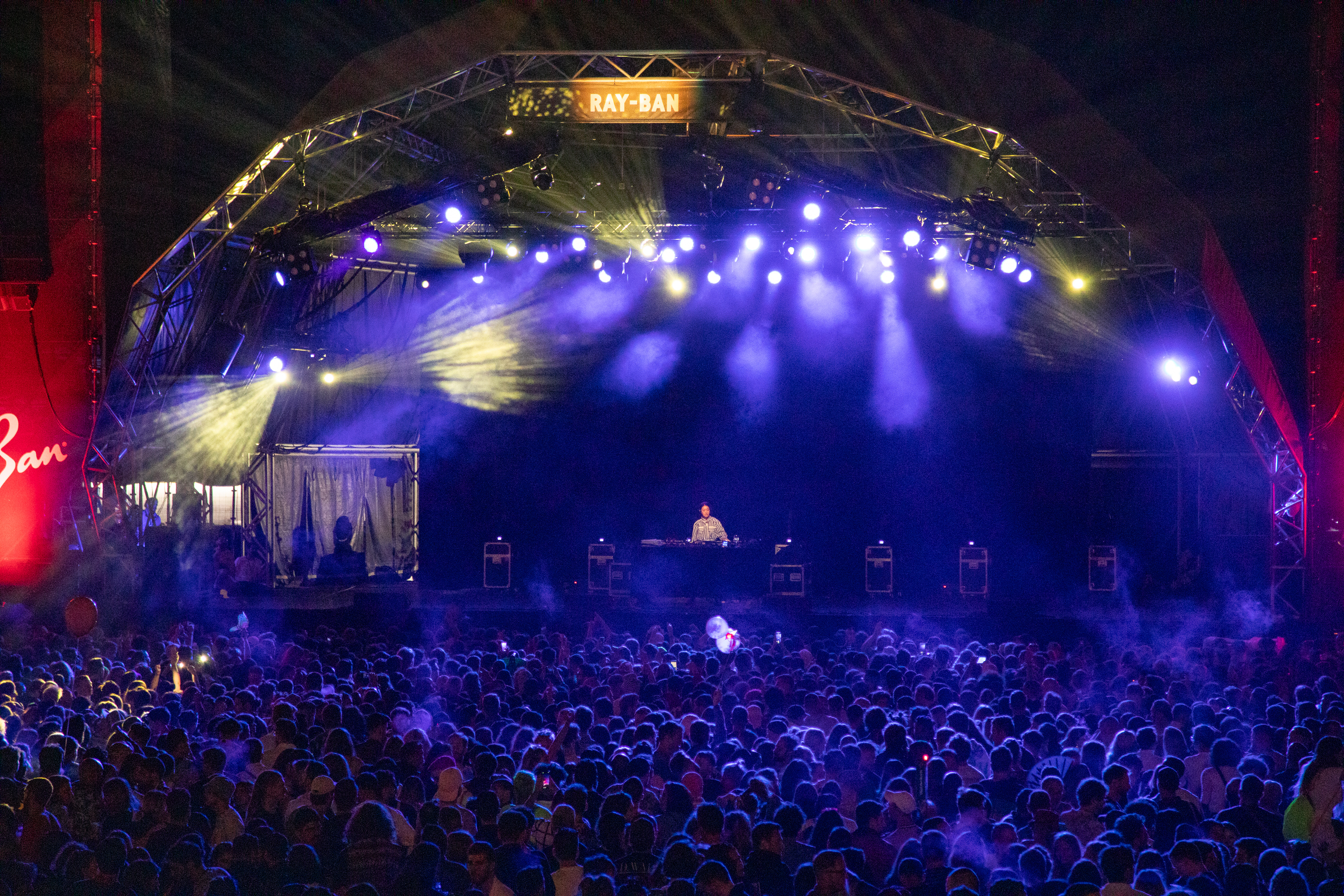
Peggy Gou performing at Primavera Sound 2019

In 2017, Gou embarked on her first North American tour and made her Boiler Room debut in New York City. She became the first Korean DJ to play in Berlin's nightclub Berghain. She plays more than one hundred live gigs in a year and has performed alongside the likes of Moodymann, The Blessed Madonna and DJ Koze. She has since played gigs as a part of worldwide festival lineups including Coachella, Glastonbury, Sonus in Croatia, Amsterdam's Dekmantel, London's Printworks, Ibiza, Amsterdam Dance Event, Primavera Sound in Portugal, Barcelona's Sónar, as well as Virgil Abloh's Off-White fashion show among others. In an Interview with Vice, she stated that she preferred to stay out of politics and would just perform for the people who want to hear her music.

Gou released her music on record labels Ninja Tune and Phonica in 2018. That same year, "It Makes You Forget (Itgehane)" won Best Track at the AIM Independent Music Awards. "It Makes You Forget (Itgehane)" was also listed on the tracklist for FIFA 19.

In 2019, Forbes named Gou as one of the Asian leaders, pioneers and entrepreneurs under age 30. She launched her own fashion label KIRIN ("giraffe" in Korean), supported by Virgil Abloh, under the New Guards Group in February, followed by her own independent record label, Gudu Records (gudu means "shoes" in Korean) in March. She has stated that she launched Gudu to give artists starting out better opportunities and treatment than she received at the beginning of her career. She next released DJ-Kicks: Peggy Gou, the 69th installment of !K7's DJ-Kicks mix compilation in June. The album became her first Billboard chart appearance, reaching number nine on the Dance/Electronic Album Sales chart, and the second compilation to reach the top 10 after Moodymann's. In July, Gou released her first music video for her hit 2019 track "Starry Night" exclusively on Apple Music, directed by Jonas Lindstroem, and once again featured Yoo Ah-in, the lead actor in the award-winning South Korean film, Burning. The music video was released worldwide on YouTube in September 2019.

In December 2020, Gou joined Apple Music's New Year's Eve DJ Mixes with 21 other electronic music artists. She next released her seventh single "Nabi" in June 2021, featuring Oh Hyuk from Korean indie rock band Hyukoh, followed by a tribute to her teenage years, "I Go", that she called "My own reimagination of the sounds I grew up loving."

In June 2023, Gou released "(It Goes Like) Nanana" through XL Recordings, featuring a sample from André Tanneberger's 1998 song "9 PM (Till I Come)". It was the lead single from her debut album, I Hear You, which was released on 7 June 2024. "I Believe In Love Again" with Lenny Kravitz was released as the second single from the album in November 2023, followed by "1+1=11" in April 2024.

In April 2026, Gou remixed Ayra Starr's single "Where Do We Go", released by Mavin Records. This was followed on 26 June 2026 by the release of their joint single "Wo, man" through XL Recordings.

== Discography ==
=== Studio albums ===
List of studio albums, with selected details and chart positions
Title	Details	Peak chart positions							
Title	Details	BEL (FL)	FRA	LTU	SCO	SWI	UK	US Heat.	US Dance
I Hear You	Released: 7 June 2024; Label: XL; Formats: CD, Cassette, Digital Download, Streaming, Vinyl	55	188	37	5	83	39	15	14

=== DJ mixes ===
List of DJ mixes, with selected details
Title	Details
DJ-Kicks: Peggy Gou	Released: 28 June 2019; Format: LP, digital; Label: !K7 Music (K7382EP)

=== Extended plays ===
List of EPs, with selected details
Title	Details
Art of War	Released: January 2016; Format: LP, digital; Label: REKIDS (REKIDS 085)
Art of War (Part II)	Released: April 2016; Format: LP, digital; Label: REKIDS (REKIDS 088)
Seek for Maktoop	Released: October 2016; Format: LP, digital; Label: Technicolour (TCLR019)
Once	Released: March 2018; Format: LP, digital; Label: Ninja Tune (ZEN12483)
Moment	Released: April 2019; Format: LP, digital; Label: Gudu Records (GUDU001)

=== Singles ===
List of singles as a lead artist, with selected chart positions and album name
Title	Year	Peak chart positions										Certifications	Album
Title	Year	AUS	FRA	GER	IRE	ITA	NLD	SWI	UK	US Dance	WW	Certifications	Album
"Day Without Yesterday" / "Six O Six"	2016	—	—	—	—	—	—	—	—	—	—		Non-album single
"It Makes You Forget (Itgehane)"	2018	—	—	—	—	—	—	—	—	—	—		Once
"Travelling Without Arriving"	2018	—	—	—	—	—	—	—	—	—	—		Non-album single
"Starry Night"	2019	—	—	—	—	—	—	—	—	—	—	BPI: Silver; FIMI: Gold	Moment
"Nabi" (featuring Oh Hyuk)	2021	—	—	—	—	—	—	—	—	—	—		Non-album single
"I Go"	2021	—	—	—	—	—	—	—	—	39	—		I Hear You
"(It Goes Like) Nanana"	2023	32	19	39	3	11	1	7	5	5	33	ARIA: Platinum; BPI: Platinum; FIMI: 2× Platinum; NVPI: Platinum; RIAA: Gold; SNEP: Platinum	I Hear You
"I Believe in Love Again" (with Lenny Kravitz)	2023	—	—	—	—	—	—	—	—	50	—		I Hear You
"1+1=11"	2024	—	—	—	—	—	—	—	—	—	—		I Hear You
"Lobster Telephone"	2024	—	—	—	—	—	—	—	—	—	—		I Hear You
"Find the Way"	2024	—	—	—	—	—	—	—	—	—	—		Non-album single
"Wo, man" (with Ayra Starr)	2026	—	—	—	—	—	—	—	—	—	—		TBA
"—" denotes a recording that did not chart or was not released in that territory.

=== Film soundtrack ===
Year	Film	Song	Notes
2025	F1	D.A.N.C.E.	Performed, written and produced

== Awards and nominations ==
Awards and nominations for Peggy Gou
Award	Year	Nominee(s)	Category	Result	Ref.
AIM Independent Music Awards	2018	"It Makes You Forget (Itgehane)"	Independent Track of the Year	Won	
BBC Radio 1 Dance Awards	2024	"(It Goes Like) Nanana"	Best Dance Track	Won	
BBC Sound of...	2024	Herself	Sound of 2024	3rd Place	
Brit Awards	2024	"(It Goes Like) Nanana"	Best International Song	Nominated	
International Dance Music Awards	2019	"It Makes You Forget"	Best Song (Electronic)	Nominated	
International Dance Music Awards	2019	Herself	Breakthrough Artist of the Year	Nominated	
International Dance Music Awards	2019	Herself	Best House Artist (Female)	Nominated	
International Dance Music Awards	2020	Herself	Best House Artist (Female)	Nominated	
International Dance Music Awards	2020	"Starry Night"	Best Song (Electronic)	Nominated	
Korean Music Awards	2020	"Starry Night"	Best Dance & Electronic Song	Nominated	
Music Week Awards	2023	Magnum #ClassicsRemixed	Music & Brand Partnership	Nominated	
UK Music Video Awards	2019	"Starry Night"	Best Color Grading in a Video	Nominated	

== Other accolades ==
=== Listicles ===
Name of publisher, year listed, name of listicle, and placement
Publisher	Year	Listicle	Placement	Ref.
Forbes Asia	2019	30 Under 30	Placed	

=== DJ Magazine Top 100 DJs ===
Year	Position	Notes	Ref.
2019	80	New Entry	
2020	69	Up 11	
2021	38	Up 31	
2022	24	Up 14	
2023	9	Up 15	
2024	10	Down 1	
2025	12	Down 2	
