= DJ-Kicks: Peggy Gou =

Compilation album by Peggy Gou
- Released: 28 June 2019
- Length: 104:28
- Label: !K7 Music

Peggy Gou chronology
Moment (2019)	DJ-Kicks: Peggy Gou (2019)	I Hear You (2024)

Singles from DJ-Kicks: Peggy Gou
- 1. "Pert" Released: 2 May 2019

DJ-Kicks: Peggy Gou is a DJ mix album, mixed by South Korean DJ and producer Peggy Gou. It was released on 28 June 2019 through !K7 Records as part of their DJ-Kicks series.

The album became her first Billboard chart appearance, reaching the 9th position on Dance/Electronic Album Sales, and the second compilation that ever got into the top 10 after Moodymann's.

== Critical reception ==
Professional ratings
Aggregate scores
Source	Rating
Metacritic	78/100
Review scores
Source	Rating
The 405	8/10
AllMusic	4/5 stars
Crack Magazine	7/10
Exclaim!	8/10
Pitchfork	7.1/10
Resident Advisor	3.2/5
Spectrum Culture	2.75/5

At Metacritic, which assigns a normalized rating out of 100 to reviews from mainstream publications, DJ-Kicks: Peggy Gou received an average score of 78, based on 5 reviews, indicating "generally favorable reviews".

Steph Lee of Resident Advisor gave the album a mixed review, writing, "Gou's DJ-Kicks, though filled with some stretches of sleek club music, struggles to find an overall thread to hold it together. The personal angle is not enough. Each of these tunes may hold a special significance in Gou's life. But to the listener, they don't quite reveal the story."

== Track listing ==
DJ-Kicks: Peggy Gou track listing
No.	Title	Artist(s)	Length
1.	"Fluresence"	Spacetime Continuum	6:51
2.	"Hungboo (DJ-Kicks)"	Peggy Gou	4:35
3.	"Earwig"	Pearson Sound	5:15
4.	"Perseguido Por El Rayo"	Pegasus	3:55
5.	"The World According to Sly & Lovechild (Andrew Weatherall Soul of Europe Mix)"	Sly & Lovechild	8:21
6.	"Rytm804"	Dorisburg	7:11
7.	"Pert"	Hiver	7:02
8.	"Flemmenup"	Kyle Hall	5:03
9.	"EPR Phenomena"	DMX Krew	2:56
10.	"3"	JRMS	5:55
11.	"Exorcist"	Shades of Rhythm	5:02
12.	"Magnetic City"	Kode9	5:11
13.	"Vampirella"	The System	3:47
14.	"Kundu"	Black Merlin	4:58
15.	"Vordhosbn"	Aphex Twin	4:51
16.	"Illusion (Mayday Mix)"	R-Tyme	6:21
17.	"Crackdown"	Psyche	5:57
18.	"Epirus"	Deniro	6:31
19.	"Cassette Jam 1993"	I:Cube	4:46
Total length:			104:28

== Charts ==
Chart performance for DJ-Kicks: Peggy Gou
Chart (2019)	Peak position
US Top Dance/Electronic Albums (Billboard)	9
