= Baja California (Myke Towers song) =

Single by Myke Towers

from the album F1 the Album
- Language: Spanish
- Released: May 23, 2025
- Genre: Latin rap
- Length: 2:24
- Label: Atlantic; Apple
- Songwriters: Michael Torres Monge; Pablo Diaz-Reixa; Oscar Adler; James E. Alexander; Ben Cauley; Allen Jones; John R Smith; Andres Vargas-Titus; William McLean
- Producer: Pablo Diaz-Reixa

Myke Towers singles chronology
"Sentimiento Natural" (2024)	"Baja California" (2025)

F1 the Album singles chronology
"Messy" (2025)	"Baja California" (2025)	"Just Keep Watching" (2025)

Visualizer
- "Baja California" on YouTube

"Baja California" is a song by Puerto Rican rapper and singer Myke Towers. It was released on May 23, 2025, through Atlantic Records and Apple Video Programming, as the third single from the soundtrack album of the film F1 (2025).

== Background ==
Towers is the only Latin artist featured on the F1 album. According to the source, "Myke Towers immersed himself in the full intensity of Formula 1 during the Formula 1 Crypto.com Miami Grand Prix 2025. Invited as a special guest by event organizers, the Puerto Rican artist took part in a high-profile experience that included exclusive team access, a pit lane tour, and a pre-race grid walk ahead of the official start."

== Composition ==
"Baja California" is a rap song that interpolates "The Choice Is Yours (Revisited)" by Native Tongues and Black Sheep.

== Personnel ==
Credits adapted from Tidal.

- Myke Towers – vocals, songwriter
- Allen Jones – songwriter
- Andres Titus – songwriter
- Ben Cauley – songwriter
- James E. Alexander – songwriter
- John R Smith - songwriter
- William McLean - songwriter
- Oscar Adler - songwriter, producer
- Pablo Diaz-Reixa - songwriter, producer
- Tom Norris – mix engineer
- Randy Merrill - mastering engineer

== Release history ==
Release dates and formats for "Baja California"
Region	Date	Format	Label	Ref.
Various	May 23, 2025	Digital download; streaming	Atlantic; Apple	
Italy	May 23, 2025	Radio airplay	Warner Italy	
