= I Hear You =

Studio album by Peggy Gou
- Released: 7 June 2024
- Recorded: 2021–2024
- Genre: Dance-pop
- Length: 40:17
- Language: Korean; English; Spanish
- Label: XL
- Producer: Peggy Gou

Peggy Gou chronology
DJ-Kicks: Peggy Gou (2019)	I Hear You (2024)

Singles from I Hear You
- 1. "(It Goes Like) Nanana" Released: 15 June 2023; 2. "I Believe in Love Again" Released: 8 November 2023; 3. "1+1=11" Released: 4 April 2024; 4. "Lobster Telephone" Released: 17 May 2024

I Hear You is the debut album by South Korean DJ and singer Peggy Gou, released on 7 June 2024 through XL Recordings. It includes the singles "I Go", "(It Goes Like) Nanana", "I Believe in Love Again" with Lenny Kravitz, and "1+1=11". The album also includes a collaboration with Villano Antillano.

== Background and themes ==
Gou called I Hear You "more than just [her] debut album" as she felt it "embodies countless hours of dedication in [her] journey to create something timeless". The album was influenced by 1990s house music.

Gou released "1+1=11" as a single alongside the album's announcement in April 2024, which is intended to represent the album's running theme of "togetherness". Gou collaborated with Icelandic–Danish artist Olafur Eliasson on the video for "1+1=11", and he also designed the angled mirrors she wears around her ears on the cover art, and contributed his poem "Your Planet Seen from Within" to the first track, "Your Art".

== Singles ==
"(It Goes Like) Nanana" was released as the album's lead single. It was followed by "I Believe in Love Again", her collaboration with Lenny Kravitz, "1+1=11" in April 2024 and "Lobster Telephone" in May 2024.

== Critical reception ==
Professional ratings
Aggregate scores
Source	Rating
Metacritic	73/100
Review scores
Source	Rating
AllMusic	3.5/5 stars
Exclaim!	8/10
The Line of Best Fit	9/10
NME	3/5 stars
Pitchfork	6.2/10

I Hear You received a score of 73 out of 100 on review aggregator Metacritic based on 12 critics' reviews, which the website categorised as "generally favorable" reception. Stereogum named it album of the week, with the website's Tom Breihan writing that its "short and sharp and punchy" tracks "don't move like the patient, thoughtful ones on her EPs. She's going for blood on this one. I Hear You works within the lineage of '90s dance that inspired the record, but it also sounds like a pop album". NME's Skye Butchard felt that "two mid-tempo tracks early on stalls the record’s momentum" but that "the album picks up in its explorative second half" and "when it works, it's like finding dance music for the first time. I Hear You has a pureness that will give many that feeling."

The Line of Best Fit's Callum Foulds concluded that Gou "pays homage to [her] talents, laying a path that is singularly hers to embark on, one on which she carries the future of dance-music, and all of it's fun". Chris Bryson of Exclaim! stated that "Gou is known for exciting eclecticism in her DJ sets, and this quality shines with growing versatility on I Hear You", describing the album as "a masterful first full dose of Gou's kaleidoscopic 'K-house'" and "striking a vibrant and dynamic balance between familiarity and freshness". Paul Simpson of AllMusic found it to be "much closer to the type of risk-taking album fans would expect her to make based on her eclectic DJ sets, seemingly encapsulating her musical evolution and influences in ten songs". Pitchfork's Chal Ravens felt that Gou "cherry-pick[s] iconic sounds from house music's '80s and '90s heyday" but concluded that "there's no point in throwing around grand concepts like so much glitter in order to feel like a serious album artist—just turn up the 'nananas' and keep the piña coladas coming".

== Track listing ==
All tracks are written by Peggy Gou; "Your Art" lyrics written with Olafur Eliasson; "I Believe in Love Again" written with Lenny Kravitz; "All That" written with Villano Antillano.

I Hear You track listing
No.	Title	Length
1.	"Your Art"	1:57
2.	"Back to One"	4:58
3.	"I Believe in Love Again" (with Lenny Kravitz)	2:56
4.	"All That" (featuring Villano Antillano)	3:53
5.	"(It Goes Like) Nanana" (edit)	3:51
6.	"Lobster Telephone"	5:20
7.	"Seoulsi Peggygou" (서울시페기구)	2:37
8.	"I Go"	5:32
9.	"Purple Horizon"	3:41
10.	"1+1=11"	5:32
Total length:		40:17

Bonus tracks edition track listing
No.	Title	Length
11.	"(It Goes Like) Nanana" (Nanadub)	6:07
12.	"I Believe in Love Again" (Jex Opolis Remix; with Lenny Kravitz)	5:51
13.	"Lobster Telephone" (Mogwaa Remix)	5:57
14.	"1+1=11" (Spray Remix)	6:27
15.	"1+1=11" (Koreless' Beatless Mix)	5:12
Total length:		69:51

Notes

- The lyrics to "Your Art" are an adaptation of the poem "Your Planet Seen from Within", written by Olafur Eliasson.
- "All That" contains a sample of "Turn Me On", written by Kevin Lyttle, Marvin E. Scandrick, Courtney Sills, Quinnes Daymond Parker, Michael Keith, Arnold Walker Hennings, and Daron Tavaris Jones, and performed by Lyttle.

== Personnel ==
- Peggy Gou – lead vocals, production, mixing
- Matt Colton – mastering
- Olafur Eliasson – creative direction
- Jongha Park – photography
- Viktor Hammarberg – design

== Charts ==
Chart performance for I Hear You
Chart (2024)	Peak position
Australian Dance Albums (ARIA)	5
Australian Hitseekers Albums (ARIA)	5
Australian Vinyl Albums (ARIA)	7
Belgian Albums (Ultratop Flanders)	55
French Albums (SNEP)	188
Lithuanian Albums (AGATA)	37
Scottish Albums (OCC)	5
Swiss Albums (Schweizer Hitparade)	83
UK Albums (OCC)	39
UK Dance Albums (OCC)	3
UK Independent Albums (OCC)	2
US Heatseekers Albums (Billboard)	15
US Top Current Album Sales (Billboard)	43
US Top Dance Albums (Billboard)	14
