= Moment (EP) =

EP by Peggy Gou
- Released: 19 April 2019
- Genres: House; disco
- Length: 13:19
- Languages: Korean; English
- Label: Gudu
- Producer: Peggy Gou

Peggy Gou chronology
Once (2018)	Moment (2019)	DJ-Kicks: Peggy Gou (2019)

Moment is the fifth EP by South Korean DJ and producer Peggy Gou, released on 19 April 2019 through Gou's imprint Gudu Records, the first release on the label. It contains two songs, including the single "Starry Night".

== Background ==
Moment serves as the first release on Gou's label, Gudu Records. Its cover art was designed by Jee-ook Choi.

== Critical reception ==
Professional ratings
Review scores
Source	Rating
Exclaim!	7/10

Anna Alger of Exclaim! felt that "the two songs complement each other; the bass heavy mix of "Starry Night" balancing out the higher melodies that characterize "Han Pan," each track serving to extend the breadth of Gou's work". Marissa Cetin of Resident Advisor summarised that "Gou has tightened her modern, versatile formula" from Once, and that "if "Starry Night" is for daytime sets, "Han Pan" is for when the sun goes down", calling "Starry Night" an "acid-tinged piano house track" and remarking that Moment "ensures [Gou's] own will last a lot longer than the spotlight's bulb". The Guardian's Kate Hutchinson called both tracks "full of fun piano stabs, retro drum claps and gentle nods to acid".

In a review of "Starry Night", Philip Sherburne of Pitchfork wrote that it "picks up the throwback sensibility of her previous singles and runs with it, propelled by gliding hi-hats, machine claps, and a staccato bassline with the faintest hint of freestyle. The glue holding it all together: bold, pumping piano chords, the ultimate signifier of house music at its balmiest".

== Track listing ==
Moment track listing
No.	Title	Length
1.	"Starry Night"	6:38
2.	"Han Pan"	6:41
Total length:		13:19
