= Just Keep Watching =

Single by Tate McRae

from the album F1 the Album
- Released: May 30, 2025
- Genre: Pop; club
- Length: 2:22
- Label: RCA
- Songwriters: Amy Allen; Ryan Tedder; Tate McRae; Tyler Spry
- Producers: Ryan Tedder; Tyler Spry

Tate McRae singles chronology
"What I Want" (2025)	"Just Keep Watching" (2025)	"Tit for Tat" (2025)

F1 the Album singles chronology
"Baja California" (2025)	"Just Keep Watching" (2025)	"Drive" (2025)

Music video
- "Just Keep Watching" on YouTube

"Just Keep Watching" is a song by Canadian singer Tate McRae. It was released on May 30, 2025, through RCA Records, Atlantic Records, and Apple Video Programming as the fourth single from the soundtrack album of the film F1. It peaked at number eight on the Billboard Global 200 and became McRae's third number one song on the US Hot Dance/Pop Songs chart. The song earned McRae her first Grammy Award nomination for Best Dance Pop Recording. It was later chosen to be the theme song for Sky Sports' new look F1 coverage, beginning with the 2026 season.

== Background and composition ==
McRae was revealed to be part of the soundtrack album on May 1, 2025. The track marks a collaboration with producers Tyler Spry and Ryan Tedder.

"Just Keep Watching" is a pop and "fast-moving" club track, set to match the "high energy" of the film featuring a "driving beat" during the chorus. It features a "quick-twitch percussion" predestined for McRae's signature "kinetic choreography".

== Music video ==
The accompanying music video, directed by Bardia Zeinali, premiered on McRae's YouTube channel on May 30, 2025. A nod to the 1978 film Grease, it features McRae strutting down a "wind-blown runway" and posing next to stacks of tires, alternating with dance-heavy sequences with onlookers dressed in racing attires. The visuals include cuts from the film.

== Accolades ==
Awards and nominations for "Just Keep Watching"
Organization	Year	Category	Result	Ref.
MTV Video Music Awards	2025	Song of Summer	Won	
MTV Video Music Awards	2025	Best Editing	Won	
MTV Video Music Awards	2025	Best Visual Effects	Nominated	
Grammy Awards	2026	Best Dance Pop Recording	Nominated	
Nickelodeon Kids' Choice Awards	2026	Favorite Song from a Movie	Nominated	

== Charts ==
=== Weekly charts ===
Weekly chart performance for "Just Keep Watching"
Chart (2025)	Peak position
Australia (ARIA)	5
Austria (Ö3 Austria Top 40)	6
Belgium (Ultratop 50 Flanders)	47
Bolivia Anglo Airplay (Monitor Latino)	13
Canada Hot 100 (Billboard)	16
CIS Airplay (TopHit)	51
Costa Rica Anglo Airplay (Monitor Latino)	13
Croatia International Airplay (Top lista)	18
Czech Republic Singles Digital (ČNS IFPI)	16
Dominican Republic Anglo Airplay (Monitor Latino)	15
Ecuador Anglo Airplay (Monitor Latino)	16
Estonia Airplay (TopHit)	2
Finland (Suomen virallinen lista)	48
France (SNEP)	69
Germany (GfK)	24
Global 200 (Billboard)	8
Greece International (IFPI)	5
Hungary (Rádiós Top 40)	33
Hungary (Single Top 40)	19
India International (IMI)	3
Ireland (IRMA)	2
Israel International Airplay (Media Forest)	12
Latvia Airplay (LaIPA)	16
Latvia Streaming (LaIPA)	11
Lebanon (Lebanese Top 20)	4
Lithuania (AGATA)	26
Luxembourg (Billboard)	9
Malaysia (Billboard)	16
Malaysia International (RIM)	16
Malta Airplay (Radiomonitor)	2
Netherlands (Single Top 100)	29
New Zealand (Recorded Music NZ)	5
Nicaragua Anglo Airplay (Monitor Latino)	6
Norway (VG-lista)	10
Panama Anglo Airplay (Monitor Latino)	7
Poland (Polish Airplay Top 100)	23
Poland (Polish Streaming Top 100)	20
Portugal (AFP)	13
Russia Airplay (TopHit)	66
Serbia Airplay (Radiomonitor)	10
Singapore (RIAS)	15
Slovakia Airplay (ČNS IFPI)	13
Slovakia Singles Digital (ČNS IFPI)	20
Sweden (Sverigetopplistan)	27
Switzerland (Schweizer Hitparade)	8
United Arab Emirates (IFPI)	3
UK Singles (Official Charts)	6
US Billboard Hot 100	33
US Hot Dance/Pop Songs (Billboard)	1
Venezuela Airplay (Record Report)	61

=== Monthly charts ===
Monthly chart performance for "Just Keep Watching"
Chart (2025)	Peak position
CIS Airplay (TopHit)	54
Estonia Airplay (TopHit)	7
Lithuania Airplay (TopHit)	30
Russia Airplay (TopHit)	90

=== Year-end charts ===
Year-end chart performance for "Just Keep Watching"
Chart (2025)	Position
Australia (ARIA)	54
Austria (Ö3 Austria Top 40)	41
Belgium (Ultratop 50 Flanders)	135
Canada (Canadian Hot 100)	55
Estonia Airplay (TopHit)	11
Germany (GfK)	60
Global 200 (Billboard)	134
Hungary (Single Top 40)	82
Switzerland (Schweizer Hitparade)	46
UK Singles (OCC)	96
US Hot Dance/Pop Songs (Billboard)	6

== Certifications ==
Certifications for "Just Keep Watching"
Region	Certification	Certified units/sales
Australia (ARIA)	2× Platinum	140,000^{‡}
Denmark (IFPI Danmark)	Gold	45,000^{‡}
France (SNEP)	Platinum	200,000^{‡}
New Zealand (RMNZ)	Platinum	30,000^{‡}
Poland (ZPAV)	Gold	62,500^{‡}
Portugal (AFP)	2× Platinum	50,000^{‡}
Spain (Promusicae)	Gold	50,000^{‡}
United Kingdom (BPI)	Platinum	600,000^{‡}
Streaming
Greece (IFPI Greece)	Platinum	2,000,000^{†}
^{‡} Sales+streaming figures based on certification alone.^{†} Streaming-only figures based on certification alone.
