= Messy (Rosé song) =

2025 single by Rosé

Single by Rosé

from the album F1 the Album
- Released: 8 May 2025
- Genre: Pop
- Length: 2:59
- Label: Atlantic; Apple
- Songwriters: Rosé; Cleo Tighe; Delacey; Matthew James Burns; Peter Rycroft
- Producers: Lostboy; Burns

Rosé singles chronology
| "Toxic Till the End" (2024) | "Messy" (2025) | "On My Mind" (2025) |

F1 the Album singles chronology
| "Lose My Mind" (2025) | "Messy" (2025) | "Baja California" (2025) |

Music video
- "Messy" on YouTube

"Messy" is a song by New Zealand and South Korean singer Rosé. It was released through Atlantic Records and Apple Video Programming on 8 May 2025 as the second single from the soundtrack album to the sports action drama film F1 (2025). A pop ballad about an intense whirlwind romance, the song was written by Rosé with Cleo Tighe, Delacey, and the song's producers Burns and Lostboy.

Critics praised "Messy" as the emotional standout on F1 the Album with its vulnerable lyrics and vocals. The song peaked at number 24 on the Billboard Global 200 and entered the top ten in Hong Kong, Malaysia, Singapore, Taiwan and Vietnam. It also charted in countries such as Australia, Canada, South Korea, and the United Kingdom. An accompanying music video directed by Colin Tilley was released alongside the single on Rosé's YouTube channel. The video intersperses scenes of Brad Pitt from F1 with shots of Rosé in various locations from the film including the Las Vegas Strip.

== Background and release ==
A day after the release of the song "Lose My Mind" by Don Toliver featuring Doja Cat as the first single of the F1 film, Atlantic Records revealed the line-up of artists involved in F1 the Album, including Rosé as a featured singer. On 1 May 2025, Rosé officially announced her involvement in the project on social media, expressing her excitement for fans to hear her "very first movie soundtrack". Promotions for the album began at an activation event held during the 2025 Miami Grand Prix on 4 May. During the event, Rosé was selected to wave the chequered flag for the sprint race. A snippet of "Messy" being played at the event was posted by social media influencer Tyler Walsh. The full song would eventually be played at the next round, the 2025 Emilia Romagna Grand Prix, before the start of the race. On 7 May, "Messy" was announced to be the film's second single, with official teasers shared throughout the day. The song, alongside an accompanying music video, was released the following day on 8 May. It marked the singer's first release since her debut studio album, Rosie, in December 2024.

== Composition and lyrics ==
"Messy" was written by Rosé, Cleo Tighe, Delacey, Matthew James Burns, and Peter Rycroft; it was produced by the latter two artists credited under the names Lostboy and Burns. According to F1's director Joseph Kosinski, Rosé was brought in and shown a scene from the film, from which she drew inspiration to create the song. It has been described to be a "sleek and passionate pop ballad" that features a "piano and anthemic percussion". Rosé sings about an intense romantic relationship and uses the central theme of "let's get messy" to convey her desire for "raw and uninhibited connection".

== Critical reception ==
Writing for Billboard, Kristen Wisneski ranked “Messy” as the sixth-best song on F1 the Album, noting that it "stands out as one of the more emotional tracks on the album, capturing the tension between emotional desire and chaos". Rolling Stone's Tim Chan praised Rosé's "pleading voice and confessional lyrics" for adding "emotional heft" to the album but observed that the track felt out of place as the sole ballad on a tracklist full of "party-ready" songs.

== Accolades ==
Awards and nominations for "Messy"
| Year | Organisation | Award | Result | Ref. |
|---|---|---|---|---|
| 2026 | Hanteo Music Awards | Special Award (OST) | Nominated | |

== Music video ==
Directed by Colin Tilley, the music video for "Messy" was released on 8 May 2025. It intersperses scenes of the F1 film with various clips of Rosé sipping martinis at a bar; sitting atop a seeming pile of diamonds in the Las Vegas nightclub Omnia; leaning over the terrace of a high-rise building; and walking down the Las Vegas Strip, which had been temporarily shut down for the music video shoot.

== Credits and personnel ==
Credits adapted from the liner notes of F1 the Album.

Recording

- Mixed at Larrabee Studios (North Hollywood, California)
- Mastered at Sterling Sound (Edgewater, New Jersey)

Personnel

- Rosé – vocals, songwriter
- Cleo Tighe – songwriter
- Delacey – songwriter
- Burns – songwriter, producer
- Lostboy – songwriter, producer
- Manny Marroquin – mix engineer
- Zach Pereyra – assistant mix engineer
- Anthony Vilchis – assistant mix engineer
- Trey Station – assistant mix engineer
- Randy Merrill – mastering engineer

== Charts ==
=== Weekly charts ===
Weekly chart performance
| Chart (2025) | Peak position |
|---|---|
| Australia (ARIA) | 84 |
| Canada Hot 100 (Billboard) | 71 |
| Global 200 (Billboard) | 34 |
| Hong Kong (Billboard) | 5 |
| Malaysia (IFPI) | 6 |
| New Zealand Aotearoa Singles (RMNZ) | 5 |
| New Zealand Hot Singles (RMNZ) | 5 |
| Philippines (Philippines Hot 100) | 67 |
| Poland (Polish Airplay Top 100) | 86 |
| Singapore (RIAS) | 6 |
| Slovakia Airplay (ČNS IFPI) | 47 |
| South Korea (Circle) | 96 |
| Taiwan (Billboard) | 2 |
| UK Singles (Official Charts) | 100 |
| US Bubbling Under Hot 100 (Billboard) | 9 |
| Vietnam (IFPI) | 4 |

=== Monthly charts ===
Monthly chart performance
| Chart (2025) | Position |
|---|---|
| South Korea (Circle) | 105 |

== Release history ==
Release dates and formats
| Region | Date | Format | Label | Ref. |
|---|---|---|---|---|
| Various | 8 May 2025 | Digital download; streaming | Atlantic; Apple | |
| Italy | 16 May 2025 | Radio airplay | Warner Italy | |
