= I Go =

Single by Peggy Gou

from the album I Hear You
- Language: Korean; English
- Released: 9 July 2021
- Genre: House; techno
- Length: 5:58 (single version); 5:32 (album version)
- Label: Gudu
- Songwriter: Peggy Gou
- Producer: Peggy Gou

Peggy Gou singles chronology
| "Nabi" (2021) | "I Go" (2021) | "(It Goes Like) Nanana" (2023) |

"I Go" is a song by South Korean DJ and producer Peggy Gou, released as a standalone single on 9 July 2021 through Gou's imprint Gudu Records. It was included on her 2024 debut album I Hear You.

== Background ==
When speaking on the song's inspiration, Gou stated that it was inspired by her years as a teenager in Korea and was meant to "a tribute to that era" and her "own reimagination of the sounds I grew up loving". She wrote the Korean lyrics on her phone in 2019, "staring at [her]self in the mirror of an airport toilet" as a way to motivate herself.

== Critical reception ==
EDM.com described "I Go" as a "scintillating blend of house and techno, with elements of disco and synthwave folded in along the way". Peter Helman of Stereogum called it "a shimmering, propulsive electronic dance track inspired by Gou's love of '90s club music". Lars Gotrich of NPR felt that it "vibrates like a glitter-pink Walkman on a summer day, its melody effervescent, backed by swagger-jacked synth-funk that turbocharges in the last minute". Chase McMullen of Beats Per Minute wrote that it "is both nostalgic and futuristic at once, recalling the sounds [Gou] grew up loving, with echoes of rave culture and (yep) even Haddaway, it's one of the most instantly lovable, endearing tracks she's recorded to date". In a review of the Soulwax remix, Andrew Ryce of Resident Advisor felt the original was "sweet and nostalgic" but the remix "dial[ed] it up to 11", with Soulwax "laying down a frisky beat" and writing that the "remix hinges on a grubby, addictive bassline".

Pitchfork ranked it as the 17th best song of 2021, with Evan Minsker calling it "engineered to motivate" and writing that Gou's "vocals are gentle, but her promise of persistence ('I go I go, I go I go') feels powerful. Throbbing drum machines further bolster her energizing message, turning a personal pep talk into a lull-crushing banger". He concluded that it is "a six-minute '90s dance megamix that feels 10 minutes too short".

== Track listing ==
Digital single
| No. | Title | Length |
|---|---|---|
| 1. | "I Go" | 5:58 |
| 2. | "I Go" (edit) | 3:44 |
| Total length: | | 9:42 |

I Go (Remixes)
| No. | Title | Length |
|---|---|---|
| 1. | "I Go" (Soulwax Remix) | 6:50 |
| 2. | "I Go" (DJ Koze Remix) | 5:29 |
| 3. | "I Go" (Maurice Fulton Remix) | 6:18 |
| Total length: | | 18:39 |

== Charts ==
Chart performance for "I Go"
| Chart (2021) | Peak position |
|---|---|
| UK Physical Singles (OCC) | 15 |
| US Hot Dance/Electronic Songs (Billboard) | 39 |
