= Drive (Ed Sheeran song) =

Single by Ed Sheeran

from the album F1 the Album
- Released: 20 June 2025
- Genre: Rock
- Length: 3:07
- Label: Atlantic; Apple
- Songwriters: Ed Sheeran; Blake Slatkin; John Mayer
- Producers: Blake Slatkin; John Mayer

Ed Sheeran singles chronology
| "Sapphire" (2025) | "Drive" (2025) | "A Little More" (2025) |

F1 the Album singles chronology
| "Just Keep Watching" (2025) | "Drive" (2025) | "Don't Let Me Drown" (2025) |

Music video
- "Drive" on YouTube

"Drive" is a song by English singer-songwriter Ed Sheeran, released as the fifth single from the soundtrack album of the film F1, on 20 June 2025. Sheeran wrote the song with its producers John Mayer and Blake Slatkin. The lyrics are about driving an F1 car with "the top down", something which is strongly discouraged by the FIA. "Drive" features Mayer on guitar alongside Foo Fighters' Dave Grohl on drums, keyboardist Rami Jaffee and bassist Pino Palladino, with additional keyboards and drum programming by Slatkin. "Drive" peaked at number 49 on the UK Singles Chart. Alongside with "Toreador Song" from the Carmen opera, the song is used for the Formula 1 podium celebrations starting in the 2025 Austrian Grand Prix, two days after the film was released.

== Critical reception ==
Billboard ranked it as the best song on the F1 the Album out of 17 tracks. According to Billboard, "Drive" hits the mark with its energetic nods to the world of racing and Formula One, and captures the high-speed thrill and intensity synonymous with F1. The song has been played on the podium at F1 races since the movie released.

== Music video ==
A music video for "Drive" was released on 20 June 2025 on Sheeran's YouTube channel. Directed by Chris Villa, the video incorporates racing imagery.

== Credits and personnel ==
Credits adapted from Tidal.

- Ed Sheeran – songwriting (Gavin DeGraw chorus), vocals
- John Mayer – songwriting (Audioslave riff), production, guitar
- Blake Slatkin – songwriting, production, additional keyboards, drum programming, engineering, vocal engineering
- Dave Grohl – drums
- Rami Jaffee – Casio keyboards, organ
- Pino Palladino – bass
- Joe Barresi – engineering
- Martin Pradler – vocal engineering
- Hunter Goddard – vocal recording engineer
- Mark "Spike" Stent – mixing
- Matt Wolach – assistant mixing engineer
- Randy Merrill – mastering

== Charts ==
=== Weekly charts ===
Weekly chart performance for "Drive"
| Chart (2025) | Peak position |
|---|---|
| Bolivia Anglo Airplay (Monitor Latino) | 9 |
| Croatia International Airplay (Top lista) | 88 |
| Japan Hot 100 (Billboard) | 88 |
| Lithuania Airplay (TopHit) | 91 |
| New Zealand Hot Singles (RMNZ) | 17 |
| South Korea (Circle) | 111 |
| UK Singles (Official Charts) | 49 |
| US Adult Pop Airplay (Billboard) | 38 |
| Uruguay Anglo Airplay (Monitor Latino) | 14 |

=== Monthly charts ===
Monthly chart performance for "Drive"
| Chart (2025) | Peak position |
|---|---|
| South Korea (Circle) | 122 |
