= Sabrina Bahsoon =

Malaysian social media influencer

- Born: Sabrina Zara Bahsoon c. November 2000; Malaysia
- Education: Durham University
- Occupations: Influencer; Musician; Model
- Years active: 2023–present
- Known for: TikTok
- Modeling information
- Height: 5 ft 6.5 in (1.69 m)
- Agency: IMG Models (New York) (2023-2025)

TikTok information
- Page: Sabrina Bahsoon
- Followers: 809,000
- Last updated: October 10, 2026

Sabrina Zara Bahsoon (born November 2000) (Note: This is inferred from an article in late October 2023 describing her as 22, and a November 2023 Instagram post celebrating her 23rd birthday. Thus, her birthday must be in early November 2000.) is a Malaysian-born social media influencer and musician, widely known by her moniker "Tube Girl". She gained widespread attention through her viral TikTok videos filmed on the London Underground, which led to the #TubeGirl trend. Bahsoon has collaborated with major fashion and beauty brands and began a music career in 2024.

== Early life and education ==
Bahsoon was born in Malaysia in November 2000 to a Malaysian mother and a Lebanese-Sierra Leonean father. Initially pursuing athletics, Bahsoon eventually relocated to London to complete her A-Level examinations. Bahsoon graduated from Durham University with a law degree in 2023 and sought out a career in either fashion or music marketing, with little success. Bahsoon is the middle child of five siblings. She is especially close with her brother, who often goes with her on work trips.

== Career ==
In 2023, Bahsoon went viral on the social media platform TikTok for her videos lip-syncing and dancing on the London Underground, earning her the nickname "Tube Girl" and spawning the viral #TubeGirl trend. As a result of the trend, Bahsoon has done 'Tube Girl' videos with a variety of celebrities including Troye Sivan, Bella Poarch and Naomi Campbell. As of 2023, the 'tube girl' hashtag on TikTok has over 1 billion views.

Following her viral success, Bahsoon collaborated with several fashion and beauty brands, appearing at the MAC Cosmetics show at London Fashion Week, later being named as the company's global brand ambassador. She attended the Balmain and Courrèges presentations at Paris Fashion Week and walked the runway for Christian Cowan. Bahsoon also appeared at the Hugo Boss Milan Fashion Week show with a video posted by the brand in connection with the 'tube girl' trend receiving over 144 million views.

In 2024, Bahsoon began a music career, releasing her debut single 'MINE' and a second single, 'Not My Kind', released in 2025. Bahsoon released her third single 'YOUNG 4EVER' in January 2026.

Bahsoon has a brief uncredited cameo appearance in the F1 movie.

Bahsoon has appeared on the cover of Cosmopolitan Middle East, as well as the digital cover of Hunger Magazine.

== Public image and impact ==
Bahsoon has been praised for her confidence and carefree attitude, as well as for the encouragement of others to 'embrace the cringe' and to care less about what people think. Bahsoon has also spoken about her happiness at being representation for her heritage, when she had previously never seen any creators that looked like her. She has been described by British Vogue as a fashion 'it-girl'.

Bahsoon has partnered with a refugee advocacy group to provide free education for Palestinian children living as refugees in Malaysia.

In October 2026, after a several month-long hiatus from social media, Bahsoon spoke publicly about her experience with anti-NMDA receptor encephalitis, a rare autoimmune disorder affecting the brain. She described initially experiencing psychiatric symptoms and acting erratically, including breaking up with her then partner and posting videos of herself screaming and crying to social media. After interventions from her sisters, she was detained under the Mental Health Act and transferred to a psychiatric hospital, where she remained for two months and was misdiagnosed with psychosis. Bahsoon’s parents doubted the diagnosis and pushed for further medical investigations that eventually led to the diagnosis of encephalitis. Bahsoon underwent multiple rounds of immunotherapy and had surgery to remove the teratomas in her ovaries. She has lost memories as a result of the condition and has since moved back to Malaysia.

== Discography ==
Singles

| Title | Year | Album | Ref. |
|---|---|---|---|
| "MINE" | 2024 | TBA | |
| "Not My Kind" | 2025 | TBA | |
| "YOUNG 4EVER" | 2026 | TBA | |
