= (It Goes Like) Nanana =

Single by Peggy Gou

from the album I Hear You
- Released: 15 June 2023
- Genre: Eurodance; dance-pop; house
- Length: 3:51 (edit); 6:07 (original)
- Label: XL
- Songwriter: Peggy Gou
- Producer: Peggy Gou

Peggy Gou singles chronology
"I Go" (2021)	"(It Goes Like) Nanana" (2023)	"I Believe in Love Again" (2023)

Music video
- "(It Goes Like) Nanana" on YouTube

"(It Goes Like) Nanana" is a song by South Korean DJ and producer Peggy Gou from her debut album, I Hear You (2024). It was released on 15 June 2023 through XL Recordings as the lead single from the album.

== Background ==
In a press release, Gou stated: "There's a feeling we all know but is hard to describe, that feeling of love, warmth and excitement when you're surrounded by friends and loved ones and the energy speaks for itself. It's difficult to put into words but to me it goes 'nanana!'"

=== Breakout success ===
"It Goes Like (Nanana)" went viral on social media when a clip of festival-goers at the Lost Nomads festival outside of Marrakesh (where Gou performed) was posted to the platform, starting a chain of events, giving the artist her mainstream breakthrough hit single. She did not have an account on TikTok at the time and was alerted to the viral clip by her friends.

== Critical reception ==
Henry Ivry of Resident Advisor called it "full-on Café del Mar worship" with "vintage rave chords elbow[ing] in over chunky, swung drums and a forlorn synth that has shades of Eurodance". Although he felt that "the lyrics are a bit silly, they're catchy" and "there is nothing, in short, subtle about the track, but who cares—this is dance pop down to a science".

== Commercial performance ==
The song debuted at number 14 on the UK Singles Chart dated 23 June 2023, making it Gou's first UK chart entry. A week later the single entered the UK top 10.

== Track listing ==
Digital single
No.	Title	Length
1.	"(It Goes Like) Nanana" (edit)	3:51
2.	"(It Goes Like) Nanana"	6:07
3.	"(It Goes Like) Nanana" (Nanadub)	6:06
Total length:		16:05

== Charts ==
=== Weekly charts ===
Weekly chart performance for "(It Goes Like) Nanana"
Chart (2023–2024)	Peak position
Australia (ARIA)	32
Australia Club Tracks (ARIA)	1
Australia Dance (ARIA)	2
Austria (Ö3 Austria Top 40)	45
Belarus Airplay (TopHit)	12
Belgium (Ultratop 50 Flanders)	1
Belgium (Ultratop 50 Wallonia)	2
Bulgaria Airplay (PROPHON)	1
Canada Hot 100 (Billboard)	69
Canada CHR/Top 40 (Billboard)	35
CIS Airplay (TopHit)	4
Croatia (Billboard)	15
Czech Republic Airplay (ČNS IFPI)	64
Czech Republic Singles Digital (ČNS IFPI)	47
Estonia Airplay (TopHit)	2
France (SNEP)	19
Germany (GfK)	39
Global 200 (Billboard)	33
Greece International (IFPI)	1
Hungary (Dance Top 40)	21
Hungary (Rádiós Top 40)	26
Iceland (Tónlistinn)	28
Ireland (IRMA)	3
Italy (FIMI)	11
Kazakhstan Airplay (TopHit)	62
Latvia Airplay (LaIPA)	1
Latvia Streaming (LaIPA)	1
Lebanon (Lebanese Top 20)	2
Lithuania (AGATA)	2
Lithuania Airplay (TopHit)	1
Luxembourg (Billboard)	3
Middle East and North Africa (IFPI)	20
Moldova Airplay (TopHit)	56
Netherlands (Dutch Top 40)	1
Netherlands (Single Top 100)	1
New Zealand Hot Singles (RMNZ)	6
Poland (Polish Airplay Top 100)	14
Poland (Polish Streaming Top 100)	30
Portugal (AFP)	28
Romania Airplay (UPFR)	6
Romania Airplay (Media Forest)	3
Russia Airplay (TopHit)	13
San Marino Airplay (SMRTV Top 50)	1
Slovakia Airplay (ČNS IFPI)	5
Slovakia Singles Digital (ČNS IFPI)	6
Sweden (Sverigetopplistan)	59
Switzerland (Schweizer Hitparade)	7
Turkey International Airplay (Radiomonitor Türkiye)	2
Ukraine Airplay (TopHit)	26
UK Singles (Official Charts)	5
UK Dance (Official Charts)	1
UK Independent (Official Charts)	1
US Hot Dance/Electronic Songs (Billboard)	5

=== Monthly charts ===
Monthly chart performance for "(It Goes Like) Nanana"
Chart (2023)	Peak position
Belarus Airplay (TopHit)	19
CIS Airplay (TopHit)	5
Czech Republic (Rádio Top 100)	79
Czech Republic (Singles Digitál Top 100)	58
Estonia Airplay (TopHit)	3
Kazakhstan Airplay (TopHit)	88
Latvia Airplay (TopHit)	15
Lithuania Airplay (TopHit)	1
Paraguay Airplay (SGP)	8
Romania Airplay (TopHit)	15
Russia Airplay (TopHit)	4
Slovakia (Rádio Top 100)	8
Slovakia (Singles Digitál Top 100)	13
Ukraine Airplay (TopHit)	69

=== Year-end charts ===
2023 year-end chart performance for "(It Goes Like) Nanana"
Chart (2023)	Position
Belarus Airplay (TopHit)	94
Belgium (Ultratop 50 Flanders)	13
Belgium (Ultratop 50 Wallonia)	20
CIS Airplay (TopHit)	40
Estonia Airplay (TopHit)	22
Global 200 (Billboard)	185
Italy (FIMI)	56
Latvia Airplay (TopHit)	149
Lithuania Airplay (TopHit)	3
Netherlands (Dutch Top 40)	24
Netherlands (Single Top 100)	20
Romania Airplay (TopHit)	52
Russia Airplay (TopHit)	73
Switzerland (Schweizer Hitparade)	63
UK Singles (OCC)	42
US Hot Dance/Electronic Songs (Billboard)	20

2024 year-end chart performance for "(It Goes Like) Nanana"
Chart (2024)	Position
Australia Dance (ARIA)	30
Belarus Airplay (TopHit)	164
Belgium (Ultratop 50 Flanders)	99
Belgium (Ultratop 50 Wallonia)	97
CIS Airplay (TopHit)	106
Hungary (Dance Top 40)	76
Lithuania Airplay (TopHit)	11
Romania Airplay (TopHit)	56
US Hot Dance/Electronic Songs (Billboard)	89

2025 year-end chart performance for "(It Goes Like) Nanana"
Chart (2025)	Position
Lithuania Airplay (TopHit)	91
Romania Airplay (TopHit)	100

== Certifications ==
Certifications and sales for "(It Goes Like) Nanana"
Region	Certification	Certified units/sales
Australia (ARIA)	Platinum	70,000^{‡}
Canada (Music Canada)	Gold	40,000^{‡}
Denmark (IFPI Danmark)	Gold	45,000^{‡}
France (SNEP)	Platinum	200,000^{‡}
Hungary (MAHASZ)	2× Platinum	8,000^{‡}
Italy (FIMI)	2× Platinum	200,000^{‡}
Netherlands (NVPI)	Platinum	80,000^{‡}
New Zealand (RMNZ)	Platinum	30,000^{‡}
Portugal (AFP)	Gold	5,000^{‡}
Spain (Promusicae)	Platinum	60,000^{‡}
United Kingdom (BPI)	Platinum	600,000^{‡}
United States (RIAA)	Gold	500,000^{‡}
Streaming
Greece (IFPI Greece)	4× Platinum	8,000,000^{†}
^{‡} Sales+streaming figures based on certification alone.^{†} Streaming-only figures based on certification alone.

== See also ==
- List of Billboard number-one dance songs of 2023
