= Once (EP) =

EP by Peggy Gou
- Released: 2 March 2018
- Genre: House
- Length: 19:52
- Languages: Korean; English
- Label: Ninja Tune
- Producer: Peggy Gou

Peggy Gou chronology
Seek for Maktoop (2016)	Once (2018)	Moment (2019)

Once is the fourth EP by South Korean DJ and producer Peggy Gou, released on 2 March 2018 through Ninja Tune. It contains three songs, including the single "It Makes You Forget (Itgehane)".

== Background ==
Gou stated that her intent with the EP was to "span different vibes – terrace, big room, morning session", with influences from "electro, African music, early 90s house and techno". When speaking on the EP's production, Gou described Once as "the most fun [she has] ever had making music".

== Critical reception ==
Professional ratings
Review scores
Source	Rating
Contactmusic.com	3.5/5 stars
Exclaim!	8/10
Pitchfork	7.7/10
The Skinny	4/5 stars

Philip Sherburne of Pitchfork wrote that "its three tracks mark a significant step forward" and called "It Makes You Forget (Itgehane)" the "standout" on which Gou "oscillates between murmuring and actual singing, and she sounds great". Sherburne noted "Hundres Times" features a "clubbier, heads-down groove" and on "Han Jan", Gou "flips her Motor City instincts into a springy electro jam". Andy Peterson of Contactmusic.com felt that with Once, Gou "demonstrates that with a little imagination you can go around the world in just a few minutes", calling "Hundres Times" "funky, slightly downbeat main mix fare" and highlighting "Han Jan" for its "post-disco vibe".

Tom Beedham of Exclaim! stated that "Gou's is atmospheric if kinetic music, pacing out personal space in grounded sashays, with vocal deliveries that are cool and understated, adding unprecedented rhythmic flows that will fit just as naturally in live sets built mostly on her back catalogue". He called all three tracks "throbbing house cinematically imbued with soft acid lines, techno vigour, and disco swing, all brilliantly buoyant and certifiably fresh". Eugenie Johnson of The Skinny described the EP as "music for the head as well as the feet, making it as perfect for burying into with headphones as it is for dancing to in the club" and noted that Gou "creates a landscape that's both cerebral and party-ready". Matt Unicomb of Resident Advisor opined that the EP is "satisfyingly diverse: hand drums and lullaby melodies mix with cosmic synths and licks of acid" and called "Han Jan" the highlight as, "like the rest of Once, it's the sound of a golden ratio between body and soul".

== Track listing ==
Once track listing
No.	Title	Length
1.	"It Makes You Forget (Itgehane)"	6:35
2.	"Hundres Times"	6:56
3.	"Han Jan"	6:21
Total length:		19:52
