= Lose My Mind (Don Toliver song) =

Single by Don Toliver featuring Doja Cat

from the album F1 the Album
- Released: April 30, 2025
- Genre: Pop rap; electropop
- Length: 3:30
- Label: RCA; Atlantic; Apple
- Songwriters: Caleb Toliver; Amala Dlamini; Hans Zimmer; Ryan Tedder; Grant Boutin
- Producers: Zimmer; Tedder; Boutin

Don Toliver singles chronology
"LV Bag" (2025)	"Lose My Mind" (2025)	"FWU" (2025)

Doja Cat singles chronology
"Just Us" (2025)	"Lose My Mind" (2025)	"Jealous Type" (2025)

F1 the Album singles chronology
"Lose My Mind" (2025)	"Messy" (2025)

Music video
- "Lose My Mind" on YouTube

"Lose My Mind" is a song by American rapper and singer Don Toliver featuring fellow American rapper and singer Doja Cat. It was released on April 30, 2025, through RCA Records, Atlantic Records, and Apple Video Programming as the lead single from the soundtrack album of the film F1. The two artists wrote the song with producers Hans Zimmer, Ryan Tedder, and Grant Boutin. The song was co-produced and mixed by Tom Norris.

== Background and release ==
On April 29, 2025, the Formula One, F1 film and F1 album social media accounts shared a hi-tech themed video teaser of a song with Don Toliver and Doja Cat harmonizing together. The video was accompanied by an announcement of the song's title "Lose My Mind" and release date the following day at noon ET as the first single from F1 the Album, the soundtrack for the film F1. "Lose My Mind" follows Toliver's collaboration with Speedy, J-Hope, and Pharrell Williams on "LV Bag" and Doja's collaborations with Lisa and Raye on "Born Again" and Jack Harlow on "Just Us" earlier in the year. The song marks Doja Cat's second film soundtrack contribution following "Vegas" on Elvis (2022) and Toliver's return to a racing film soundtrack after "Fast Lane" with Lil Durk and Latto on F9 (2021).

== Composition ==
"Lose My Mind" was described as a "high-energy, electronic" track employing a "groovy, synthwave backdrop."

== Music video ==
A music video for "Lose My Mind" was released on the same day as the single's release on Don Toliver's YouTube channel. Directed by Christian Breslauer, the high-concept video heavily incorporates racing imagery. It opens with a close-up of one of the Formula One vehicles with Toliver singing inside of it. The clip then shows an X-ray version of the car and Toliver singing atop a pedestal made up of driver helmets. It then depicts Doja Cat being created by a pair of robots as a half-human half-automobile, after which she hangs nude in a pool of car oil while swinging atop an engine.

== Charts ==
=== Weekly charts ===
Weekly chart performance for "Lose My Mind"
Chart (2025–2026)	Peak position
Belarus Airplay (TopHit)	1
Canada Hot 100 (Billboard)	62
CIS Airplay (TopHit)	7
Croatia International Airplay (Top lista)	51
Czech Republic Airplay (ČNS IFPI)	4
Czech Republic Singles Digital (ČNS IFPI)	78
Ecuador Anglo Airplay (Monitor Latino)	15
El Salvador Anglo Airplay (Monitor Latino)	9
Estonia Airplay (TopHit)	126
Global 200 (Billboard)	38
Greece International (IFPI)	81
Hong Kong (Billboard)	12
India International (IMI)	2
Ireland (IRMA)	73
Japan Hot Overseas (Billboard Japan)	19
Kazakhstan Airplay (TopHit)	5
Latvia Airplay (TopHit)	5
Lithuania (AGATA)	78
Malaysia (IFPI)	16
Malaysia International (RIM)	11
Malta Airplay (Radiomonitor)	13
Middle East and North Africa (IFPI)	17
Moldova Airplay (TopHit)	96
New Zealand Hot Singles (RMNZ)	8
Nicaragua Anglo Airplay (Monitor Latino)	3
Paraguay Anglo Airplay (Monitor Latino)	12
Poland (Polish Airplay Top 100)	76
Poland (Polish Streaming Top 100)	93
Portugal (AFP)	130
Puerto Rico Anglo Airplay (Monitor Latino)	5
Russia Airplay (TopHit)	5
Saudi Arabia (IFPI)	15
Singapore (RIAS)	29
Slovakia Airplay (ČNS IFPI)	40
Slovakia Singles Digital (ČNS IFPI)	72
South Korea (Circle)	55
Taiwan (Billboard)	6
Turkey International Airplay (Radiomonitor Türkiye)	1
Ukraine Airplay (TopHit)	4
UK Singles (Official Charts)	85
United Arab Emirates (IFPI)	4
US Bubbling Under Hot 100 (Billboard)	11
US Rhythmic Airplay (Billboard)	34
Venezuela Anglo Airplay (Monitor Latino)	7

=== Monthly charts ===
Monthly chart performance for "Lose My Mind"
Chart (2025)	Peak position
Belarus Airplay (TopHit)	1
CIS Airplay (TopHit)	11
Kazakhstan Airplay (TopHit)	7
Latvia Airplay (TopHit)	9
Russia Airplay (TopHit)	11
South Korea (Circle)	56
Ukraine Airplay (TopHit)	5

=== Year-end charts ===
Year-end chart performance for "Lose My Mind"
Chart (2025)	Position
Belarus Airplay (TopHit)	29
CIS Airplay (TopHit)	36
Kazakhstan Airplay (TopHit)	31
Latvia Airplay (TopHit)	81
Russia Airplay (TopHit)	40

== Certifications ==
Certifications for "Lose My Mind"
Region	Certification	Certified units/sales
Canada (Music Canada)	Gold	40,000^{‡}
France (SNEP)	Gold	100,000^{‡}
New Zealand (RMNZ)	Gold	15,000^{‡}
^{‡} Sales+streaming figures based on certification alone.

== Release history ==
Release dates and formats for "Lose My Mind"
Region	Date	Format	Label	Ref.
Various	April 30, 2025	Digital download; streaming	Atlantic; Apple; RCA	
Italy	May 2, 2025	Radio airplay	Warner Italy	
