= F1 (film) =

2025 film by Joseph Kosinski

- Theatrical release poster
- Directed by: Joseph Kosinski
- Screenplay by: Ehren Kruger
- Story by: Joseph Kosinski; Ehren Kruger
- Produced by: Jerry Bruckheimer; Joseph Kosinski; Lewis Hamilton; Brad Pitt; Dede Gardner; Jeremy Kleiner; Chad Oman
- Starring: Brad Pitt; Damson Idris; Kerry Condon; Tobias Menzies; Javier Bardem
- Cinematography: Claudio Miranda
- Edited by: Stephen Mirrione
- Music by: Hans Zimmer
- Production companies: Apple Studios; Jerry Bruckheimer Films; Plan B Entertainment; Monolith Pictures; Dawn Apollo Films
- Distributed by: Apple Original Films; Warner Bros. Pictures (Note: Split distribution between Apple TV and Warner Bros. Pictures; Apple exclusively handles the SVOD release, while Warner Bros. handles the theatrical, home media, and VOD releases.)
- Release dates: June 16, 2025 (Radio City); June 27, 2025 (United States)
- Running time: 155 minutes
- Country: United States
- Language: English
- Budget: $200–300 million
- Box office: $634.1 million

F1 (marketed as F1 the Movie) is a 2025 American sports drama film directed by Joseph Kosinski from a screenplay by Ehren Kruger, and a story by Kosinski and Kruger. The film stars Brad Pitt, Damson Idris, Kerry Condon, Tobias Menzies, and Javier Bardem. The plot follows a Formula One (F1) racing driver who returns after a 30-year absence to save his former teammate's underdog team from collapse.

Development of the film began in December 2021 with Pitt, Kosinski, Kruger, and producer Jerry Bruckheimer attached to the project; the latter three had previously collaborated on Top Gun: Maverick (2022). Supporting cast members were revealed in early 2023, before the start of principal photography at Silverstone that July. Filming also took place during Grand Prix weekends of the 2023 and 2024 World Championships, with the collaboration of the FIA, the governing body of F1. Racing sequences were adapted from the real-life races, with F1 teams and drivers appearing throughout, including Lewis Hamilton, who was also a producer. Hans Zimmer composed the film's score, while numerous artists contributed to its soundtrack.

F1 premiered at Radio City Music Hall in New York City on June 16, 2025, and was released in the United States by Warner Bros. Pictures and Apple Original Films on June 27. The film grossed over $634 million worldwide against a $200–300 million budget, becoming the ninth-highest-grossing film of 2025, the highest-grossing auto racing film of all time, the highest-grossing film by Apple, and the highest-grossing film of Pitt's career. In addition to receiving positive reviews from critics, the film secured four Academy Awards nominations, including Best Picture (winning Best Sound), while the National Board of Review named it as one of the top ten films of the year.

== Plot ==
Aging former Formula One (F1) prodigy Sonny Hayes has spent the last 30 years living as a racer-for-hire, following a career-ending crash at the 1993 Spanish Grand Prix that has left him burdened by the failure to live up to his potential. (Note: Based on Martin Donnelly and his career-ending crash at the 1990 Spanish Grand Prix.) After winning the 24 Hours of Daytona, (Note: Sonny is depicted winning the GTD class of the 24 Hours of Daytona, the fourth-highest class after GTP, LMP2, and GTD Pro; under the rules in IMSA, drivers who are older than 55—regardless of status—are declared amateurs.) he is approached by his former teammate Rubén Cervantes, owner of the struggling APXGP F1 team, who asks him to be their second driver. Rubén explains that unless APXGP wins one of the nine remaining Grands Prix of the season, his investors will sell the team. Sonny reluctantly agrees after Rubén insists that victory will prove he is the "best in the world".

Sonny meets the team, including technical director Kate McKenna and ambitious rookie Joshua Pearce. Joshua fears that the failing APXGP could derail his career and aims to attract interest from another team. Sonny struggles with the modern F1 machinery but quickly diagnoses APXGP's weaknesses, proposing that the vehicles be upgraded with enhanced aerodynamics to compensate for their speed disadvantage.

At the British Grand Prix, Sonny and Joshua compete against each other rather than cooperating, resulting in both crashing out. Acknowledging the team's need to secure a points finish, Sonny exploits the rules at the Hungarian Grand Prix by deliberately colliding with rivals to trigger safety car periods. This allows Joshua to close the gap to the frontrunners and secure APXGP's first top-ten finish. (Note: The sequence is based on the intentional crash of Nelson Piquet Jr. at the 2008 Singapore Grand Prix.) During the rain-affected Italian Grand Prix, Sonny advises Joshua to remain on slick tires, trading grip for speed and elevating him to second place. However, he ignores Sonny's instruction to wait for a straight before overtaking Max Verstappen, skids and flies off the track, while his car bursts into flames. (Note: The crash draws from Alex Peroni's airborne accident at the 2019 Monza Formula 3 round, as well as Niki Lauda's at the 1976 German Grand Prix and Romain Grosjean's at the 2020 Bahrain Grand Prix.) Sonny rescues him, but Joshua is injured and misses the next three races.

An increasingly arrogant Joshua returns at the Belgian Grand Prix and deliberately forces Sonny into a crash. Afterward, Sonny criticizes him for foolishly setting the team back for personal glory. Seeking to ease tensions, Kate organizes a poker game to highlight their similar backgrounds, after which Sonny and Kate spend the night together. He later admits to her that he races to recapture the rare moments when he feels untouchable.

Following an anonymous tip alleging that Kate's car upgrades are illegal, (Note: The tip claimed Kate manufactured her floor upgrades with external assistance, violating F1 technical regulations.) APXGP is forced to remove them, leaving the team at a disadvantage. Frustrated—and realizing he has skipped his ritual of having a random playing card with him in the cockpit—Sonny drives recklessly during the Las Vegas Grand Prix and crashes. While he recovers, Rubén discovers that Sonny's 1993 injuries left him medically unfit for F1, with risks of blindness or death, and fires him for his own safety. APXGP board member Peter Banning then admits to Sonny that he orchestrated his signing and the anonymous tip to sabotage the team and force its sale, offering Sonny significant compensation to let APXGP fail. Meanwhile, Joshua begins applying Sonny's racing techniques, admits fault for his earlier crash, and recommits to the team. Concealing his blurred vision and headaches, Sonny persuades Rubén to let him return, just as the FIA clears Kate and restores her upgrades.

At the season-ending Abu Dhabi Grand Prix, Joshua battles Lewis Hamilton and Charles Leclerc for the lead. After Sonny is caught in a minor crash, the race is red-flagged, allowing APXGP to repair both cars before a three-lap sprint to the finish. On the restart, Sonny overtakes Leclerc and sacrifices his own chance of victory by holding off Hamilton so Joshua can move into first. On the final lap, Hamilton and Joshua collide, clearing the way for Sonny to take his first F1 win and secure APXGP's future. Joshua is offered a seat with Mercedes but declines. As the team celebrates, Sonny quietly prepares to leave, parting on good terms with Joshua and promising to see Kate soon. Some time later, he lines up for the Baja 1000. When asked what he is racing for, Sonny laughs.

== Cast ==
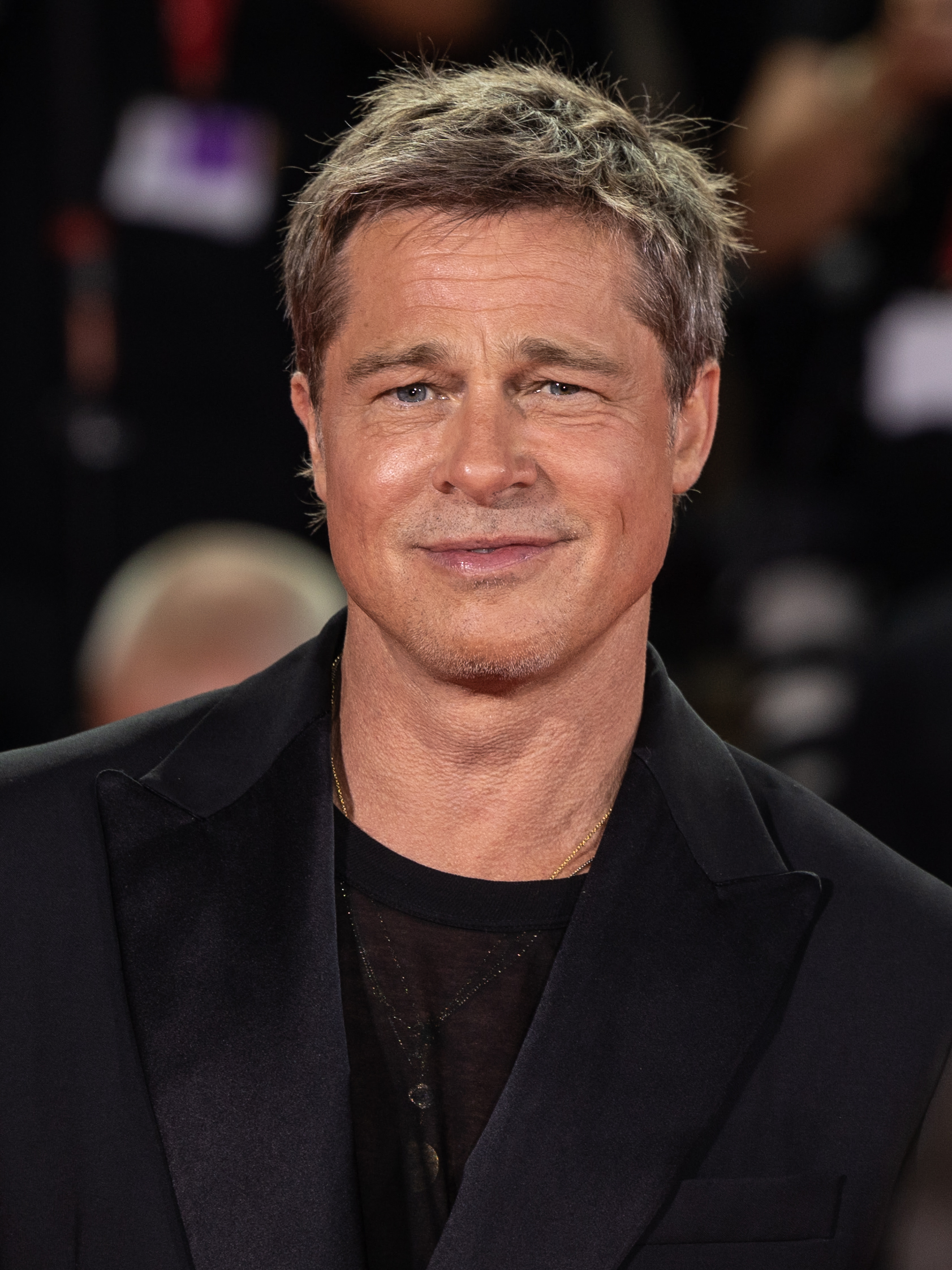
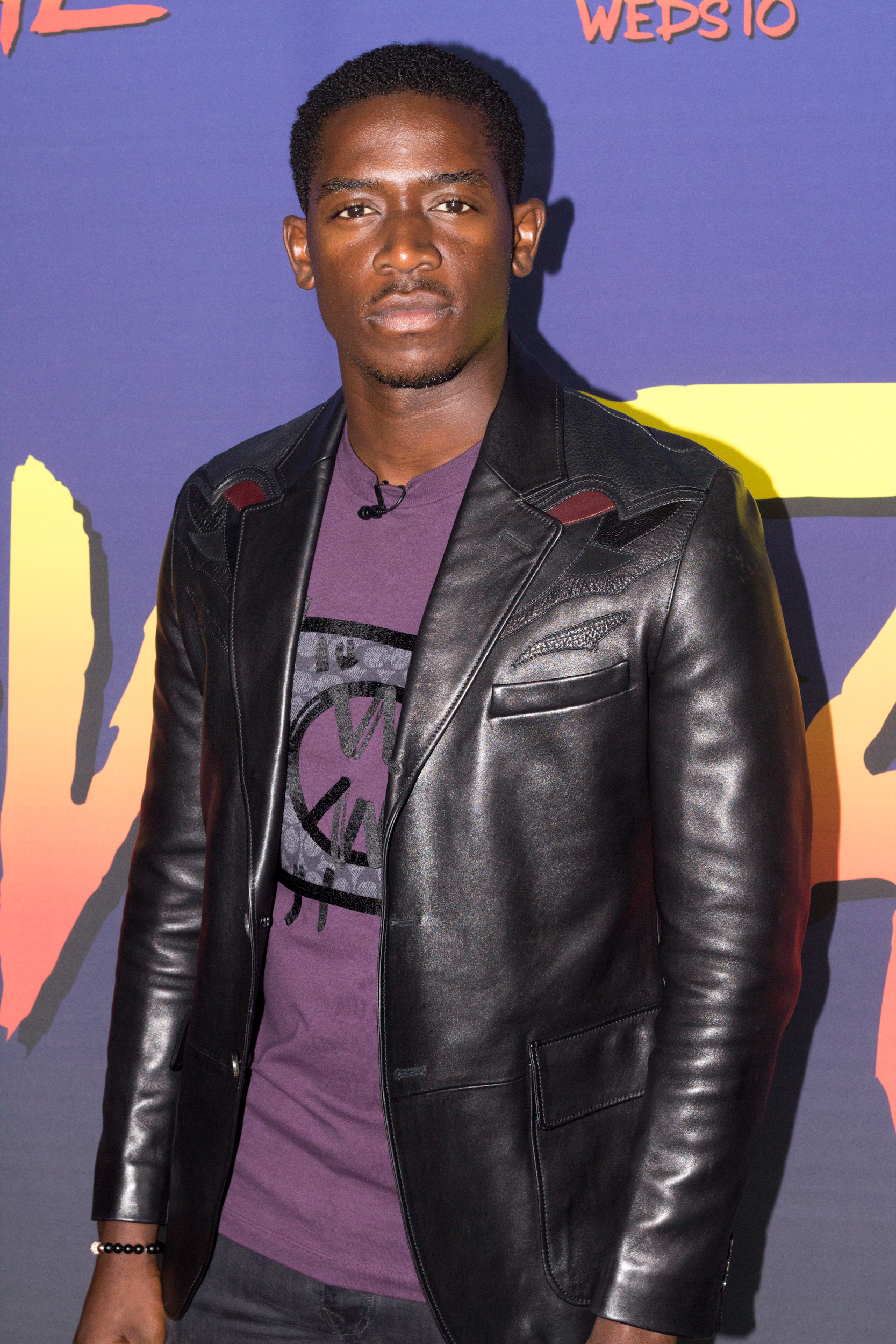
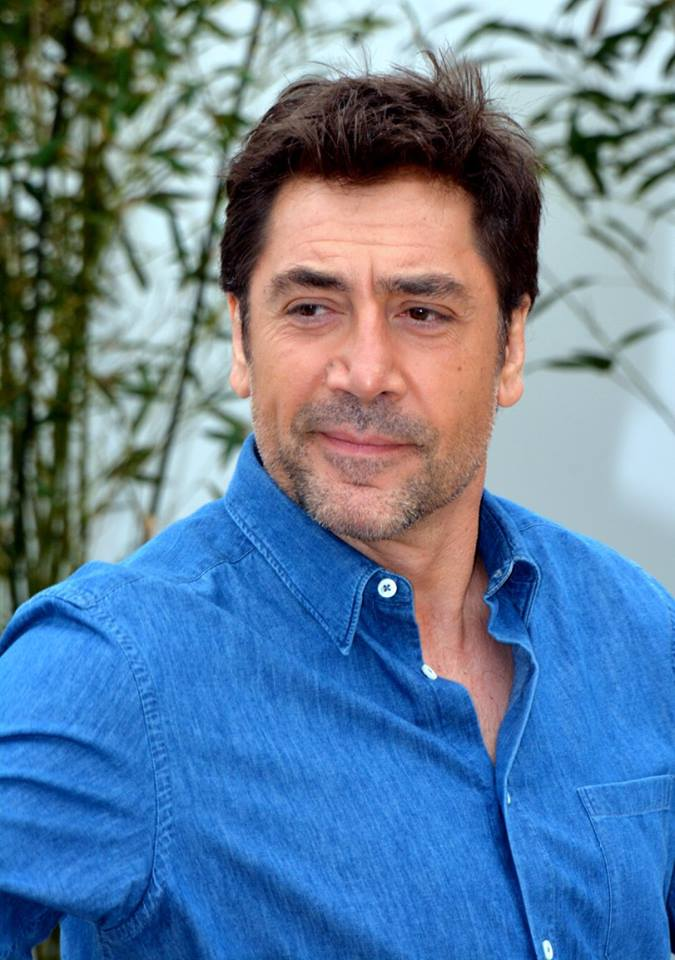
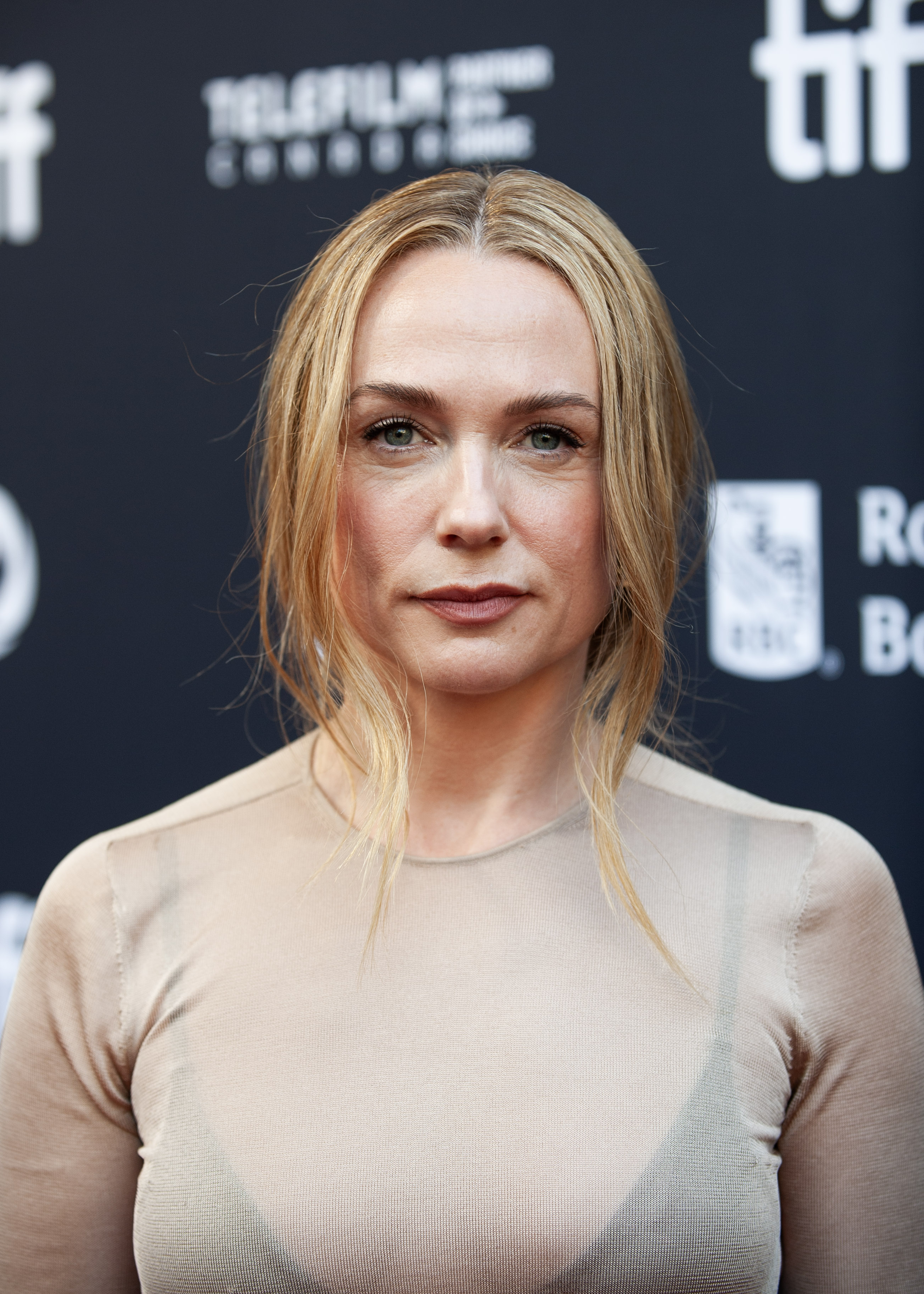
F1 stars Brad Pitt, Damson Idris, Kerry Condon, and Javier Bardem (clockwise from upper left).
- Brad Pitt as Sonny Hayes, a nomadic racer-for-hire and former 1990s Formula One driver for Lotus who returns to F1 with APXGP
- Damson Idris as Joshua Pearce, a hotshot rookie who drives for APXGP, becoming Sonny's teammate and main rival
- Kerry Condon as Kate McKenna, the APXGP technical director and Sonny's love interest
- Javier Bardem as Rubén Cervantes, the APXGP team owner, Sonny's friend and former Lotus teammate
- Tobias Menzies as Peter Banning, a sly, scheming APXGP board member
- Kim Bodnia as Kaspar Smolinski, the APXGP team principal
- Sarah Niles as Bernadette Pearce, Joshua's mother
- Will Merrick as Hugh Nickleby, Sonny's APXGP race engineer
- Joseph Balderrama as Rico Fazio, Joshua's APXGP race engineer
- Abdul Salis as Dodge Dowda, the APXGP chief mechanic
- Callie Cooke as Jodie, a clumsy APXGP pit stop tire gunner
- Samson Kayo as Cashman, Joshua's cousin and manager
- Simon Kunz as Don Cavendish, an antagonistic sports commentator present at the F1 weekends in which Sonny participated
- Liz Kingsman as Lisbeth Bampton, the APXGP PR agent
- Luciano Bacheta as Luca Cortez, the APXGP reserve driver
- Shea Whigham as Chip Hart, owner of Chip Hart Racing, for whom Sonny drives the 24 Hours of Daytona
- Kyle Rankin as Cale Kelso, one of Sonny's co-drivers for Chip Hart Racing in the 24 Hours of Daytona

Simone Ashley was cast in an undisclosed role, but her appearance was cut to only a cameo, credited as herself. Additionally, Craig Dolby and Duncan Tappy acted as stunt drivers, alongside Bacheta.

=== Formula One drivers, personnel, and others ===
The film is based on the 2023 Formula One season and was filmed during both the 2023 and 2024 seasons. As a result, many Formula One drivers and personnel appear—or are credited—in the film as themselves. The drivers are as follows, with the teams and achievements they had at the time:

- Alexander Albon of Thailand, driver for Williams;
- Fernando Alonso, two-time World Drivers' Champion of Spain, driver for Aston Martin;
- Oliver Bearman of the United Kingdom, driver for Ferrari and Haas; (Note: Bearman was credited in the film but did not compete in any of the Grands Prix where filming took place.)
- Valtteri Bottas of Finland, driver for Alfa Romeo; (Note: The film is set in 2023, when the team was known as Alfa Romeo.)
- Franco Colapinto of Argentina, driver for Williams;
- Nyck de Vries of the Netherlands, driver for AlphaTauri; (Note: The film is set in 2023, when the team was known as AlphaTauri.)
- Jack Doohan of Australia, driver for Alpine;
- Pierre Gasly of France, driver for Alpine;
- Zhou Guanyu of China, driver for Alfa Romeo; (Note: "Guanyu" is Zhou Guanyu's given name, but he was placed between Gasly and Hamilton in the end credits.)
- Lewis Hamilton, seven-time World Drivers' Champion of the United Kingdom, driver for Mercedes; (Note: Also served as an executive producer)
- Nico Hülkenberg of Germany, driver for Haas;
- Liam Lawson of New Zealand, driver for AlphaTauri;
- Charles Leclerc of Monaco, driver for Ferrari;
- Kevin Magnussen of Denmark, driver for Haas;
- Lando Norris of the United Kingdom, driver for McLaren;
- Esteban Ocon of France, driver for Alpine;
- Sergio Pérez of Mexico, driver for Red Bull Racing;
- Oscar Piastri of Australia, driver for McLaren;
- Daniel Ricciardo of Australia, driver for AlphaTauri;
- George Russell of the United Kingdom, driver for Mercedes;
- Carlos Sainz Jr. of Spain, driver for Ferrari;
- Logan Sargeant of the United States, driver for Williams;
- Lance Stroll of Canada, driver for Aston Martin;
- Yuki Tsunoda of Japan, driver for AlphaTauri;
- Max Verstappen, two-time (Note: The film is set in 2023, at which point Verstappen was a two-time World Drivers' Champion.) World Drivers' Champion of the Netherlands, driver for Red Bull Racing.

Formula One personnel who appear in the film include:

- Zak Brown, CEO of McLaren;
- Stefano Domenicali, CEO of the Formula One Group;
- Christian Horner, team principal and CEO of Red Bull Racing;
- Guenther Steiner, team principal of Haas; (Note: The film is set in 2023, when Steiner was in this role.)
- Lawrence Stroll, owner and chairman of Aston Martin and father of Lance Stroll;
- Frédéric Vasseur, team principal of Ferrari;
- James Vowles, team principal of Williams;
- Toto Wolff, team principal, CEO, and co-owner of Mercedes.

Sky Sports F1 commentators Martin Brundle and David Croft provide commentary for races depicted in the film. Leigh Diffey provides commentary for the 24 Hours of Daytona scene. Cameo appearances include Porsche factory driver Patrick Long as Sonny's other co-driver at the 24 Hours of Daytona race, motorsport presenters Rachel Brookes, Natalie Pinkham, and Will Buxton, Dutch DJ Tiësto and social media influencer Sabrina Bahsoon. Chris Hemsworth and his brother Liam also appear as attendees of a race.

== Production ==
=== Development ===
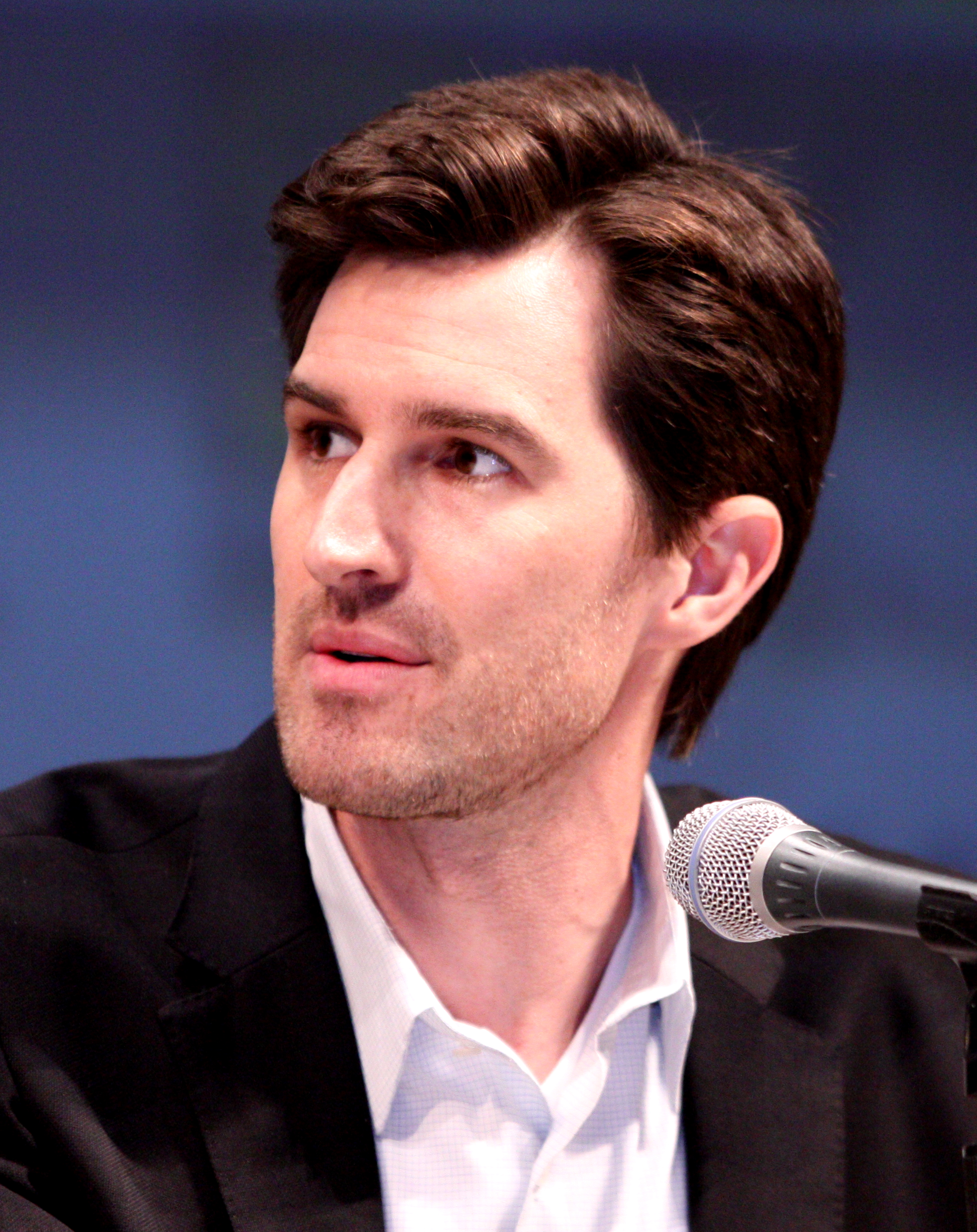
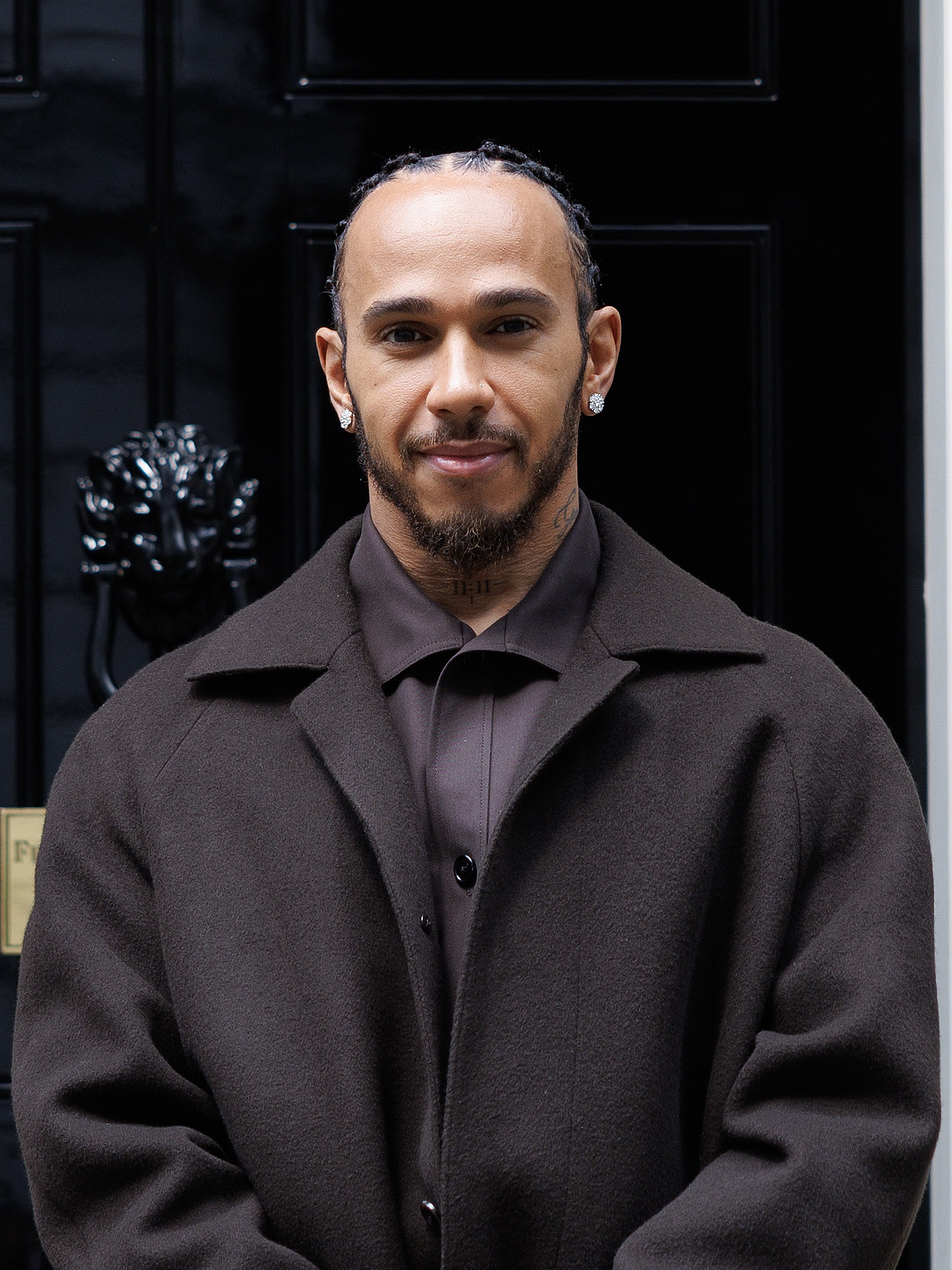
Joseph Kosinski (left) directed the film, reuniting with Top Gun: Maverick producer Jerry Bruckheimer and writer Ehren Kruger. Seven-time World Drivers' Champion Lewis Hamilton (right) was a producer.

On December 3, 2021, a bidding war commenced for an untitled film starring Brad Pitt, with producer Jerry Bruckheimer, director Joseph Kosinski, and screenwriter Ehren Kruger, who previously worked on Top Gun: Maverick (2022), on board in their respective roles. F1 driver Lewis Hamilton was also involved in the film as both a producer and actor. Studios involved in the bidding were Paramount Pictures, Metro-Goldwyn-Mayer, Sony Pictures, Universal Pictures, and Walt Disney Pictures, and streaming platforms Netflix, Apple, and Amazon. Pitt was paid $30 million for his involvement.

In November 2022, Claudio Miranda announced he would be the film's cinematographer. In April 2023, Damson Idris was hired after a lengthy casting process, which included a shortlist of actors driving the car in January 2023. Kerry Condon and Tobias Menzies would join the cast in the following months. Sarah Niles and Simone Ashley also joined the cast. However, in June 2025, Kosinski revealed that Ashley's role had been cut from the film. Niles revealed that her character is of Caribbean descent and initially planned to use a Jamaican accent but instead settled on a Bajan accent, a choice the director supported.

On July 5, 2024, the title F1 was announced. A teaser trailer premiered before the 2024 British Grand Prix. Kruger received sole credit for the film's screenplay, along with story credit with Kosinski. Jez Butterworth, Kara Smith, Aaron Sorkin, and Christopher Storer earned off-screen "Additional Literary Material" credit.

In May 2024, Puck's Matthew Belloni reported the film's budget to be $300 million. Bruckheimer and Kosinski disputed the claim; the former cited rebates and sponsorships as lowering the budget, and the latter said: "I've never had an experience where they were off by this much on a film. I'm not sure where that number came from." In 2025, ahead of the film's theatrical release, some industry sources reported the film's budget to be $200 million, though others still claimed the $300 million figure (Apple would regularly dish out $200 million for its pictures).

=== Filming ===
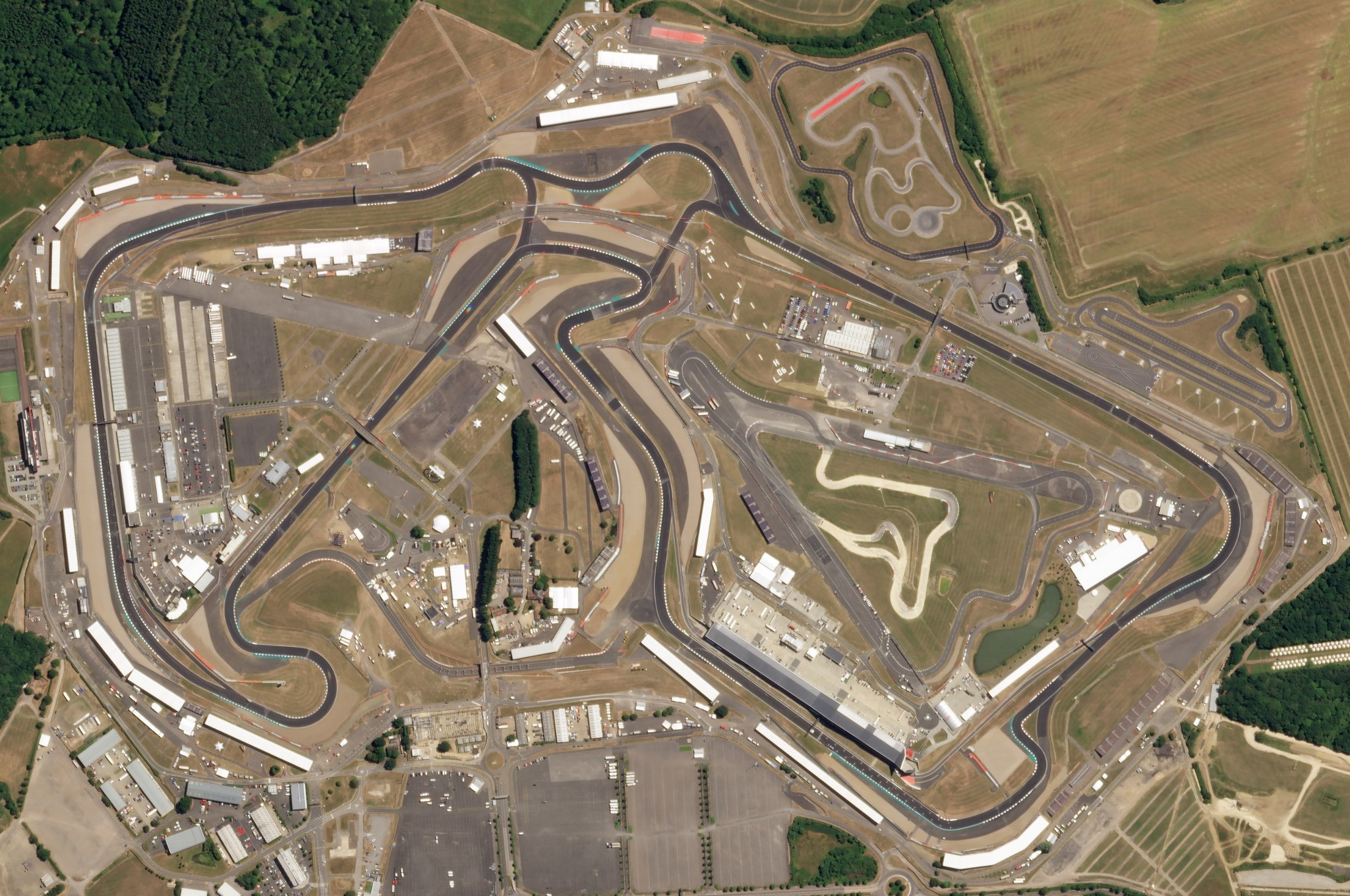
Principal photography began at Silverstone in July 2023.

Prior to filming, Pitt and Idris tested Formula Three and Formula Two cars at Paul Ricard in France. The Dallara F2 2018 was stretched, widened and modified with a Formula One aerodynamic package created by Mercedes Applied Science and run by Carlin Motorsport. Six visually identical chassis were created in total, some powered by the Mecachrome V634, some by GP3 V6 engines, and one by an electric motor, which was used to prevent overheating for shots in the pit lane. Another six remote-controlled chassis were used to film crashes.

In July 2023, principal photography began at the Silverstone Circuit in the United Kingdom, including filming during the British Grand Prix weekend between July 7–9, outside of the official F1 sessions. The APXGP team had its own garage and motorhome during the weekend and their car was kept on display alongside other F1 cars during the mandatory "show and tell" session before the track action. Pitt was present with the actual drivers at the drivers' briefing and he and Idris stood alongside the drivers during the national anthem before the race. Their two cars were placed at the back of the grid with stunt drivers driving a part of the formation lap.

Apple designed a custom onboard camera for the car based on iPhone and powered by its A-series system on a chip. The camera technology used for the fast-paced shots had evolved since Top Gun: Maverick. With help from Sony, the cameras were shrunk to about a quarter of the size of those from Maverick such that up to four cameras could be set up onto the cars at a time, with minimal effect on the weight. The camera bodies and RF transmitters were stashed in the floor of the cars. Panavision also designed a special remote control that allowed the cameras on the cars to create panning movements.

Filming also took place at the Hungaroring, Spa-Francorchamps, Monza, Zandvoort, Suzuka, Autódromo Hermanos Rodríguez, Las Vegas, Yas Marina, and Brands Hatch—which was used as a stand-in for the onboard Jerez footage and the fiery crash scene in Italian Grand Prix. At the 2024 24 Hours of Daytona, the #120 Wright Motorsports Porsche 911 GT3 R competed with a livery of the fictional "Chip Hart Racing" team from the film, with multiple replicas of it and the #96 Turner Motorsport BMW M4 GT3 used for filming. A camera-mounted Lola B2K/10 was used as a filming car for high-speed shots. The filming car struggled to keep up with the modified F2 cars and by the time filming had shifted to Hungary, the car lost oil pressure and had a pump failure, which led to it being scrapped and replaced by one of the GP3-engined APXGP cars. The APXGP headquarters scenes were filmed at the McLaren Technology Centre, while Williams provided its wind tunnel for some shots, and the racing simulator scenes were filmed at the Mercedes headquarters in Brackley.

Speaking with former F1 driver and Sky Sports F1 pundit Martin Brundle at the 2023 British Grand Prix, Pitt confirmed Javier Bardem would star. Later that month, ESPN reported that the film was titled Apex, but later retracted this claim.

The week after filming had started at the British Grand Prix, the SAG-AFTRA strike began, resulting in the lead actors not being available and a reduced crew consisting of only Equity actors sent to races from the Hungarian Grand Prix onwards. Filming was then forced to continue through the 2024 season to make up for the lost races.

=== Music ===
During the 2024 Austrian Grand Prix, Hans Zimmer announced he would be composing the score for the film, marking his second collaboration with Kosinski after Top Gun: Maverick. It is also Zimmer's second Formula One-related score, following the Ron Howard-directed film Rush (2013). Zimmer co-composed the score with Steve Mazzaro, creating what Kosinski described as a musical identity that reflects Formula One's dual nature, "a sport that straddles both the past and the present, with its rich history and cutting-edge technology."

Zimmer crafted a "hybrid" score combining orchestra and electronic music. He envisioned the orchestra as "the human that sits inside the machine," while the electronics represented the machine itself. Discussions with producer and F1 champion Lewis Hamilton helped shape Zimmer's understanding of that relationship, influencing how the music was written. Electronic music, Zimmer noted, was also key to capturing the unpredictability of racing. "With synthesizers, it's the same as in the race – you don't quite know who's going to do what next. There's always the element of surprise built in, and I think that's very important in a film like this: you score for surprise."

The score features guitarist Tim Henson, drummer Marco Minnemann and members of Zimmer's touring band. This marks Zimmer's 13th collaboration with Bruckheimer, beginning with Days of Thunder (1990). Central to the score is a recurring motif for Pitt's character, Sonny Hayes, which Zimmer described as a "gunslinger motif." Zimmer and Mazzaro paid attention to the way the score interacts with the film's sound design and visuals.

The film's soundtrack, F1 the Album, was released day-and-date with the film's North American debut. Don Toliver and Doja Cat released the lead single "Lose My Mind" on April 30, 2025, followed by Rosé's "Messy" on May 8, Myke Towers's "Baja California" on May 23, Tate McRae's "Just Keep Watching" on May 30, and Ed Sheeran's "Drive" on June 20. Additional promotional singles include "No Room for a Saint" by Dom Dolla, "Bad as I Used to Be" by Chris Stapleton, "OMG!" by Tiësto and Sexyy Red, and "Underdog" by Roddy Ricch.

=== Post-production ===
Ryan Tudhope was the VFX supervisor, and Framestore provided post-production services on the film, citing involvement from their studios in Montreal, London and Mumbai. Tudhope returned to collaborate with director Joseph Kosinski, leveraging techniques they used on Top Gun: Maverick to re-skin jets to replace F1 cars captured during real Grands Prix with the fictional black-and-gold APXGP cars.

The SAG-AFTRA strike was underway when production first began shooting for the Monza scenes in Italy, which meant the cast could not film. Stunt scenes were undertaken, with the plan to return to Monza the following year. However, scheduling of the Monza race and a re-paving of the entire track meant that a second round of filming there could not take place. "So," says F1 visual effects supervisor Ryan Tudhope, "we shot all of the cast stuff that we needed at Silverstone instead. We shot Silverstone for Monza and then relied on the array vehicle and scanning done in Italy to create a digital version of the Monza backgrounds. We'd use these to replace what we shot at Silverstone with Monza environments."

The film features 2,500 visual effects shots.

== Marketing ==
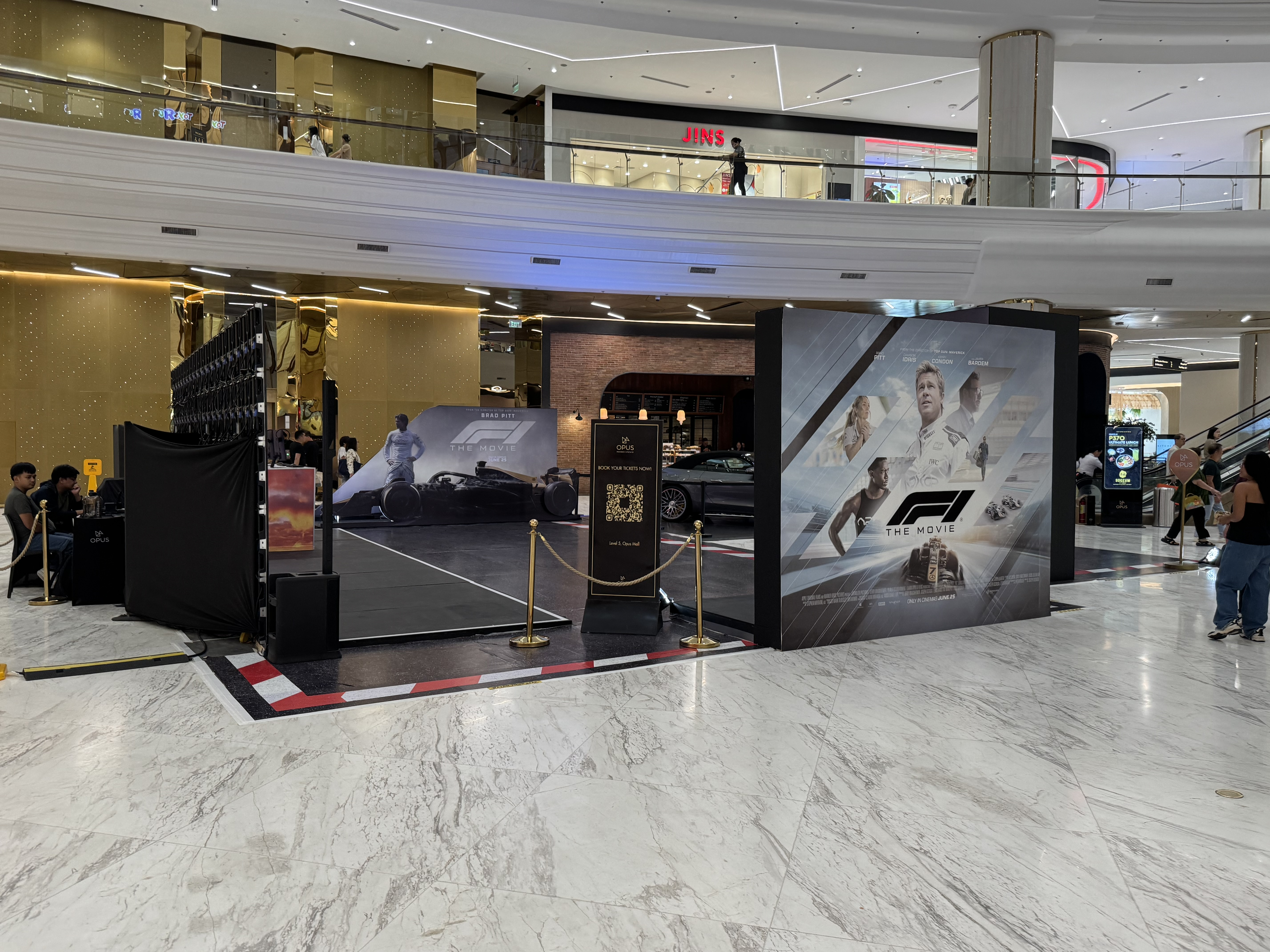
Promotional booth for F1 in Bridgetowne

The film was marketed under the title F1 the Movie.

Ahead of its release, Apple gave the film a comedic spotlight at its 2025 Worldwide Developers Conference, held on 9 June. The keynote opened with Craig Federighi at the wheel of the APXGP car—complete with Apple CarPlay on board—navigating the roof of Apple Park as if running a solo Grand Prix, with Tim Cook as his race director.

Two official trailers followed: the debuted during the weekend of the 2024 British Grand Prix, and the second premiered ahead of the 2025 Australian Grand Prix. A television spot was also aired during Super Bowl LIX.

On June 11, 2025, Apple released a "haptic trailer" for the film; when played on the Apple TV app, the Taptic Engine on supported iPhones vibrates and pulses sync with the on-screen action.

Sponsorships from various brands featured in the film brought in at least $40 million, according to Forbes estimates. Many of the brands were featured on the APXGP cars and clothing as team sponsors, such as Expensify, GEICO, SharkNinja, MSC Cruises and EA Sports. Other sponsors that featured on the cars such as IWC Schaffhausen released watches themed on APXGP's black and gold colors, Tommy Hilfiger launched a line of clothing, and Mercedes-AMG revealed a limited APXGP-edition Mercedes-AMG GT 63. The F1 25 game by EA Sports featured the APXGP livery as it appears in the film alongside scenarios that players can undertake. Peak and GEICO were sponsors of the fictional "Chip Hart Racing" (played by Wright Motorsports in IMSA) team from the 24 Hours of Daytona scenes. Heineken 0.0 released a commercial for their product featuring Pitt and Idris as F1 drivers.

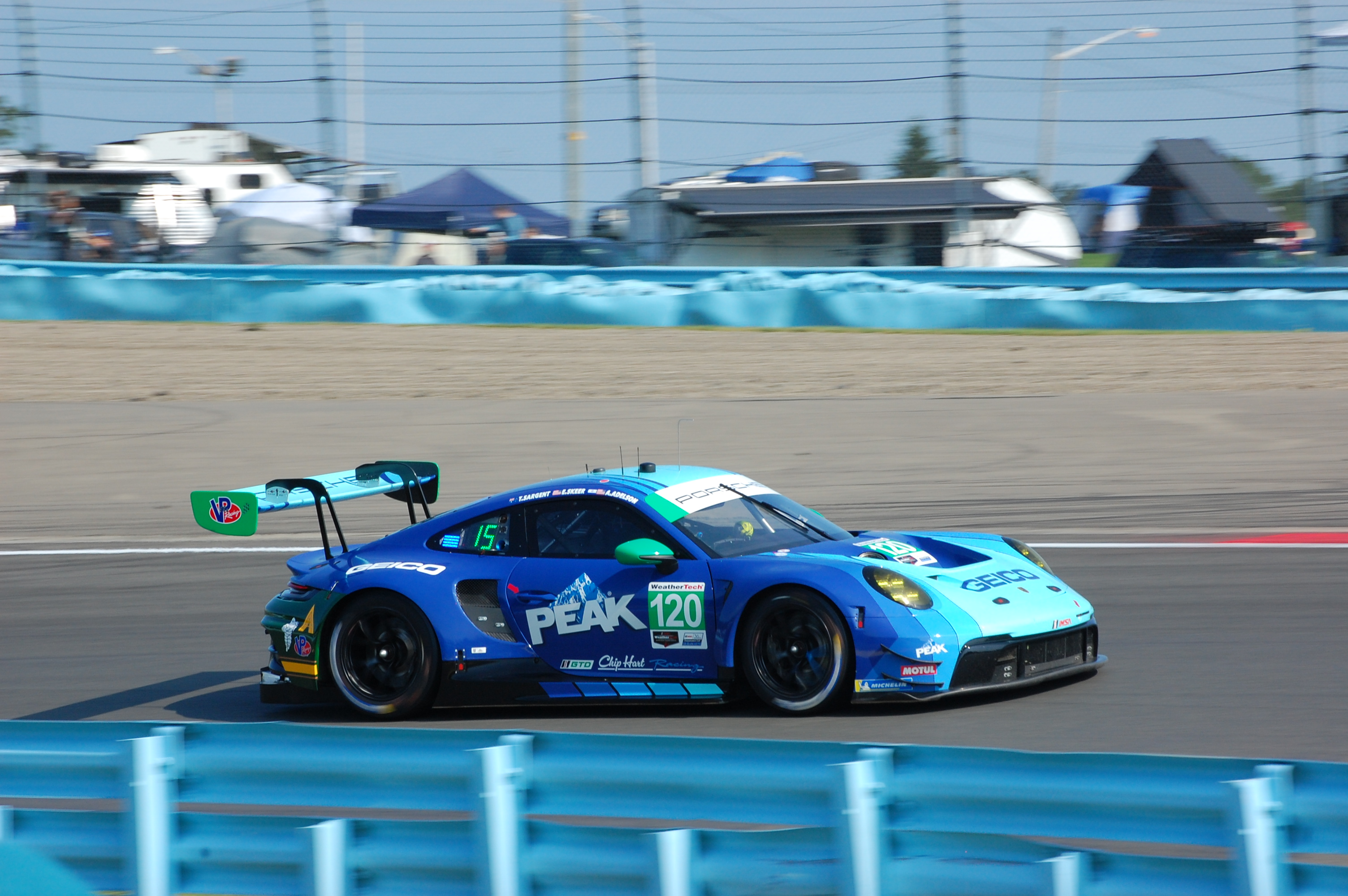
"Chip Hart Racing" Porsche 911 GT3 R (992) at the 2025 Sahlen's Six Hours of The Glen

At the 2025 24 Hours of Le Mans, the #90 Manthey Racing Porsche 911 GT3 R ran a livery similar to the one used for filming at the 2024 24 Hours of Daytona. At the 2025 Sahlen's Six Hours of The Glen the following weekend, the same #120 Wright Motorsports Porsche 911 GT3 R used for filming in 2024 ran the race with the livery from the film. The drivers, crew and IMSA personnel were also given a private screening.

Hot Wheels released of a 1:64-scale die-cast model of the #7 APXGP car driven by Brad Pitt's character in the film. In certain Latin American countries, McDonald's launched a special combo in partnership with F1, where customers had the option to pay extra to get a 1:43 scale APXGP or McDonald's-liveried Bburago model car. Some McDonald's outlets in São Paulo also had full-size F1 cars on display.

== Release ==
=== Theatrical ===
In June 2022, Apple acquired distribution rights in a package deal worth $130–140 million before above-the-line compensation. In June 2024, Warner Bros. Pictures acquired the theatrical, home entertainment and digital purchase distribution rights from Apple. The film had an early IMAX screening on June 23, 2025. The film was released in the IMAX format internationally on June 25, 2025, and was released domestically on June 27, 2025. A private screening was held in Monaco during the Cannes Film Festival for the drivers of the 2025 F1 season. Due to popular demand, the film was re-released in IMAX on August 8, 2025.

The film had its world premiere on June 16, 2025, at the Radio City Music Hall in New York City, with the cast and 2025 F1 drivers in attendance. The European premiere was held on June 23 at Empire Leicester Square in London. A Qatar Airways flight from Montreal to New York was chartered for the F1 drivers and team principals to attend the premiere following the Canadian Grand Prix.

=== Home media ===
F1 was released on digital on August 22, 2025, and was released on DVD, Blu-ray and Ultra HD Blu-ray on October 7, 2025. Apple, who retains the SVOD rights, released the film on the Apple TV streaming service on December 12.

=== Cybercrime ===
The release of the film coincided with a significant rise in cybercrime, as scammers exploited the film's popularity by creating fake live streaming sites and fraudulent toy giveaways linked to a bogus McDonald's–Apple promotion, tricking users into sharing personal and financial information. Cybersecurity firm Kaspersky confirmed that these scams were widespread.

== Reception ==
=== Box office ===
F1 has grossed $189.6 million in the United States and Canada, and $444.5 million in other territories, for a worldwide total of $634.1 million.

Opening to $146.3 million worldwide, the film is considered to be Apple's first box office hit, and the first film from the studio to top the box office on its opening weekend. It surpassed $200 million in its second weekend. In early August, it became the highest-grossing Brad Pitt film in history, surpassing the $540 million theatrical run of World War Z (2013). In September 2025, Variety reported the film was expected to make a theatrical profit of around $34 million.

In the United States and Canada, F1 was released alongside M3GAN 2.0, and was projected to gross anywhere from $35 million to $60 million in its opening weekend, with most industry estimates around $40 million. The film made $10 million in previews, including $7 million from Thursday showings. It debuted to $57 million, topping the box office. In its second weekend, the film made $26.1 million, dropping 54%, finishing second behind newcomer Jurassic World Rebirth, and surpassing Napoleon (2023) to become Apple's highest-grossing film. F1 made $13.1 million in its third weekend, finishing third behind Superman and Jurassic World Rebirth.

=== Critical response ===
On review aggregation website Rotten Tomatoes, 82% of 368 critics' reviews were positive, with an average rating of 7.1/10. The website's consensus reads, "Driven by Brad Pitt's laidback magnetism and sporting a souped-up engine courtesy of Joseph Kosinski's kinetic direction, F1 the Movie brings vintage cool across the finish line." Metacritic, which uses a weighted average, assigned the film a score of 68 out of 100, based on 57 critics, indicating "generally favorable" reviews. Audiences polled by CinemaScore gave the film an average grade of "A" on an A+ to F scale, while those surveyed by PostTrak gave it a 92% overall positive score, with 78% saying they would definitely recommend the film.

Lovia Gyarkye of The Hollywood Reporter described it as "a deft addition to a sturdy lineage of motorsport flicks, from Rush and Gran Turismo to Ford v Ferrari and, most recently, Ferrari." Barry Hertz of Globe and Mail explained that "nothing is exactly new in F1, yet at the same time it is all immensely, rewardingly renewable -- a true blue box of recycled cinematic trash, compacted into something irresistibly bright and shiny." Amy Nicholson of The Los Angeles Times stating that "the pleasures of F1 are engineered to bypass the brain. It's muscular and thrilling and zippy, even though at over two-and-a-half hours long, it has a toy dump truck's worth of plot." Manohla Dargis of The New York Times deemed F1 to be "an enjoyably arranged collection of all the visual attractions and narrative clichés that money can buy."

Of more negative reviews, BBC's Nicholas Barber gave the film two stars out of five and wrote: "Formula One enthusiasts may disagree, and they may be delighted that their beloved motorsport has been put on the big screen in such a laudatory fashion. Everyone else: this is not where you want to be." Filmmaker and actress Jodie Foster later added: "I look at a movie like F1 and I'm like, F1 was made by AI... the structure was exactly the structure that you would learn in school. The actors say the lines exactly the way it would be written if a computer was writing exactly what would be the right thing for that time and they were able to dominate the technology to make something big and beautiful and potentially where a lot of the information comes from other places."

=== In motorsport media ===
Reception within motorsport media was mixed. Ben Hunt of Autosport said it was "good for non-F1 fans", whereas Mark Mann-Bryans said it was "not good for anyone watching", lauding the production quality and soundtrack but criticising the plot and female character tropes. Fred Smith of Road & Track said the film was "entertaining, but hardcore racing fans will wince". Phillip Horton of Autoweek described the film as "solid enough nonsense for a little bit of escapism".

Katy Fairman of Motor Sport described the film as "comedically unrealistic", adding that "with the level of access they had into [F1] itself, it felt a little like [APXGP] before Sonny Hayes showed up: pointless". Mixed reviews also came from journalists at The Race, with praise for the racing sequences and criticism for its depiction of women in motorsport and plot. Top Gear's Jason Barlow described it as "a crowd-pleasing, feel-good blockbuster". Chris Medland of Racer described the racing footage as "spectacular", but criticised the character development—particularly that of Kate McKenna—and added that "for some it might be too hard to get lost in the APXGP world when you know so much about the real one that it was filmed in—as incredible as that world looks".

Defending four-time World Drivers' Champion Max Verstappen skipped the private screening for F1 drivers and the New York premiere, and Carlos Sainz Jr. cautioned "pure F1 fans" to "be open-minded to Hollywood films".

=== Accolades ===
Award	Date of ceremony	Category	Recipient(s)	Result	Ref.
Academy Awards	March 15, 2026	Best Picture	Chad Oman, Brad Pitt, Dede Gardner, Jeremy Kleiner, Joseph Kosinski, Jerry Bruckheimer	Nominated	
Academy Awards	March 15, 2026	Best Film Editing	Stephen Mirrione	Nominated	
Academy Awards	March 15, 2026	Best Sound	Gareth John, Al Nelson, Gwendolyn Yates Whittle, Gary Rizzo, Juan Peralta	Won	
Academy Awards	March 15, 2026	Best Visual Effects	Ryan Tudhope, Nicolas Chevallier, Robert Harrington, Keith Dawson	Nominated	
Actor Awards	March 1, 2026	Outstanding Action Performance by a Stunt Ensemble in a Motion Picture	Various (Note: Jordan Albrert, Luciano Bacheta, Dea Bailey, Russell Balogh, Jack Barlow, Randy Beckman, Matthew Bell, Botand Bóta, Rob Bowen, Jon Braver, Liam Carey, Tony Christian, Andrius Davidenas, Ben Dimmock, Jamie Dobb, Craig Dolby, Tanner Foust, Dan Griffiths, George Harris, Gergő Hodúr, Samuel Hubinette, Melissa Humler, Rob Hunt, Erich Joiner, Johnny Kanavas, Barry Karakas, Justin Kell, Graham Kelly, Troy Kenchington, Jonathan Kennard, Alex Kirby, Adam K Kirley, Zoltán Klement, Andre Layne, Ákos Lenkei, Patrick Long, Chelsea Mather, Erol Mehmet, Rhys Millen, Ollie Millroy, Rafael Navarro IV, David Newton, Iván Orsányi, Joseph Paxton, Gary Powell, Greg Powell, Chris Reid, Hasit Savani, Matt Sherren, Curtis Rowland Small, Matthew Stirling, Duncan Tappy, Greg Tracy, Elmo Walker, Garrett Warren, Oliver Webb, Marcus White, Roland Zoltán)	Nominated	
African-American Film Critics Association	February 18, 2026	Best Supporting Actor	Damson Idris	Won	
African-American Film Critics Association	February 18, 2026	Top 10 Films of the Year	F1	7th Place	
Artios Awards	February 26, 2026	Feature Big Budget – Drama	Lucy Bevan and Emily Brockmann	Nominated	
Astra Film Awards	January 9, 2026	Best Action or Science Fiction Feature	F1	Nominated	
Astra Midseason Movie Awards	July 3, 2025	Best Picture	F1	Nominated	
Astra Midseason Movie Awards	July 3, 2025	Best Actor	Brad Pitt	Nominated	
Astra Midseason Movie Awards	July 3, 2025	Best Supporting Actor	Javier Bardem	Nominated	
Astra Midseason Movie Awards	July 3, 2025	Best Supporting Actress	Kerry Condon	Nominated	
Astra Midseason Movie Awards	July 3, 2025	Best Stunts	F1	Nominated	
Austin Film Critics Association	December 18, 2025	Best Editing	Stephen Mirrione	Nominated	
Austin Film Critics Association	December 18, 2025	Best Stunt Work	Gary Powell, Luciano Bacheta, Craig Dolby	Nominated	
Austin Film Critics Association	December 18, 2025	Best Visual Effects	Ryan Tudhope, Nikeah Forde, Robert Harrington, Nicolas Chevallier, Eric Leven, Edward Price, Keith Dawson	Nominated	
British Academy Film Awards	February 22, 2026	Best Special Visual Effects	Ryan Tudhope, Keith Alfred Dawson, Nicolas Chevallier, Robert Harrington	Nominated	
British Academy Film Awards	February 22, 2026	Best Editing	Stephen Mirrione	Nominated	
British Academy Film Awards	February 22, 2026	Best Sound	Gareth John, Al Nelson, Gwendolyn Yates Whittle, Gary A. Rizzo, Juan Peralta	Won	
Camerimage	November 22, 2025	Golden Frog	Claudio Miranda	Nominated	
Celebration of Cinema and Television	December 9, 2025	Supporting Actor Award – Film	Damson Idris	Won	
Chicago Film Critics Association	December 12, 2025	Best Editing	Stephen Mirrione, Patrick J. Smith	Nominated	
Costume Designers Guild	February 12, 2026	Excellence in Contemporary Film	Julian Day	Nominated	
Critics' Choice Movie Awards	January 4, 2026	Best Cinematography	Claudio Miranda	Nominated	
Critics' Choice Movie Awards	January 4, 2026	Best Editing	Stephen Mirrione	Won	
Critics' Choice Movie Awards	January 4, 2026	Best Visual Effects	Ryan Tudhope, Nikeah Forde, Robert Harrington, Nicolas Chevallier, Eric Leven, Edward Price, Keith Dawson	Nominated	
Critics' Choice Movie Awards	January 4, 2026	Best Stunt Design	Gary Powell, Luciano Bacheta, Craig Dolby	Nominated	
Critics' Choice Movie Awards	January 4, 2026	Best Song	Ed Sheeran (for "Drive")	Nominated	
Critics' Choice Movie Awards	January 4, 2026	Best Score	Hans Zimmer	Nominated	
Critics' Choice Movie Awards	January 4, 2026	Best Sound	Al Nelson, Gwendolyn Yates Whittle, Gary Rizzo, Juan Peralta, Gareth John	Won	
Golden Globe Awards	January 11, 2026	Cinematic and Box Office Achievement	F1	Nominated	
Golden Globe Awards	January 11, 2026	Best Original Score	Hans Zimmer	Nominated	
Golden Tomato Awards	January 13, 2026	Fan Favorite Movies	F1	Nominated	
Golden Tomato Awards	January 13, 2026	Fan Favorite Action Movie	F1	Nominated	
Grammy Awards	February 1, 2026	Best Compilation Soundtrack for Visual Media	F1 the Album	Nominated	
Grammy Awards	February 1, 2026	Best Dance Pop Recording	Tate McRae (for "Just Keep Watching")	Nominated	
Grammy Awards	February 1, 2026	Best Country Solo Performance	Chris Stapleton (for "Bad As I Used To Be")	Won	
Hollywood Music In Media Awards	November 19, 2025	Song – Feature Film	Ed Sheeran, Blake Slatkin, and John Mayer (for "Drive")	Nominated	
Hollywood Music In Media Awards	November 19, 2025	Song – Feature Film	Don Toliver, Doja Cat, Hans Zimmer, Ryan Tedder, and Grant Boutin (for "Lose My Mind")	Nominated	
Hollywood Music In Media Awards	November 19, 2025	Score – Feature Film	Hans Zimmer	Nominated	
Hollywood Music In Media Awards	November 19, 2025	Soundtrack Album	Atlantic Records	Won	
IFTA Film & Drama Awards	February 20, 2026	Best Supporting Actress	Kerry Condon	Won	
Kids' Choice Awards	November 14, 2026	Favorite Song from a Movie	"Just Keep Watching" – Tate McRae	Nominated	
National Board of Review	December 3, 2025	Top 10 Films	F1	Won (Note: Award shared with nine other films.)	
Producers Guild of America Awards	February 28, 2026	Best Theatrical Motion Picture	F1	Nominated	
San Diego Film Critics Society	December 15, 2025	Best Editing	Stephen Mirrione, Patrick J. Smith	Nominated	
San Diego Film Critics Society	December 15, 2025	Best Sound Design	F1	Runner-up	
San Francisco Bay Area Film Critics Circle	December 14, 2025	Best Film Editing	Stephen Mirrione	Nominated	
Saturn Awards	March 8, 2026	Best Action / Adventure Film	F1	Nominated	
Seattle Film Critics Society	December 15, 2025	Best Original Score	Hans Zimmer	Nominated	
Seattle Film Critics Society	December 15, 2025	Best Visual Effects	Ryan Tudhope, Nicolas Chevallier, Robert Harrington	Nominated	
Set Decorators Society of America	February 21, 2026	Best Achievement in Décor/Design of a Contemporary Feature Film	Andrew McCarthy, Véronique Melery, Mark Tildesley, and Ben Munro	Nominated	
St. Louis Film Critics Association	December 14, 2025	Best Visual Effects	Ryan Tudhope, Nikeah Forde, Robert Harrington, Nicolas Chevallier, Eric Leven, Edward Price, and Keith Dawson	Nominated	
St. Louis Film Critics Association	December 14, 2025	Best Editing	Stephen Mirrione	Nominated	
St. Louis Film Critics Association	December 14, 2025	Best Action Film	F1	Nominated	
St. Louis Film Critics Association	December 14, 2025	Best Stunts	Gary Powell, Luciano Bacheta, and Craig Dolby	Nominated	
Visual Effects Society Awards	February 25, 2026	Outstanding Visual Effects in a Photoreal Feature	Ryan Tudhope, Nikeah Forde, Robert Harrington, Nicolas Chevallier, Keith Alfred Dawson	Nominated	
Visual Effects Society Awards	February 25, 2026	Outstanding Compositing & Lighting in a Feature	Hugo Gauvreau, Chris Davies, Raushan Raj, Amaury Rospars (For Modern Race and POV Footage)	Won	
Washington D.C. Area Film Critics Association	December 7, 2025	Best Editing	Stephen Mirrione	Won	
Washington D.C. Area Film Critics Association	December 7, 2025	Best Stunts	F1	Nominated	

== Sequel ==
Following the early box office success of the film, Variety reported that a sequel was being discussed and the Financial Times reported on the possibility of a franchise. A sequel was officially greenlit in February 2026.

== See also ==
- F1 25 – 2025 racing video game
- List of auto racing films
