= Online Film Critics Society Awards 2025 =

29th Online Film Critics Society Awards

29th Online Film Critics Society Awards
- Date: January 26, 2026

Highlights
- Best Picture: One Battle After Another
- Most awards: Sinners (10)
- Most nominations: Sinners (16)

The 29th Online Film Critics Society Awards, honoring the best in film for 2025, were announced on January 26, 2026, by the Online Film Critics Society.

The nominations were announced on January 12, 2026. Ryan Coogler's period supernatural horror film Sinners led the nominations with sixteen, followed by One Battle After Another with thirteen, Marty Supreme with nine and Sentimental Value with eight.

Four new categories were introduced this year—Best Ensemble & Casting, Best Makeup & Hairstyling, Best Sound Design, and Best Choreography (Dance & Stunt).

== Winners and nominees ==
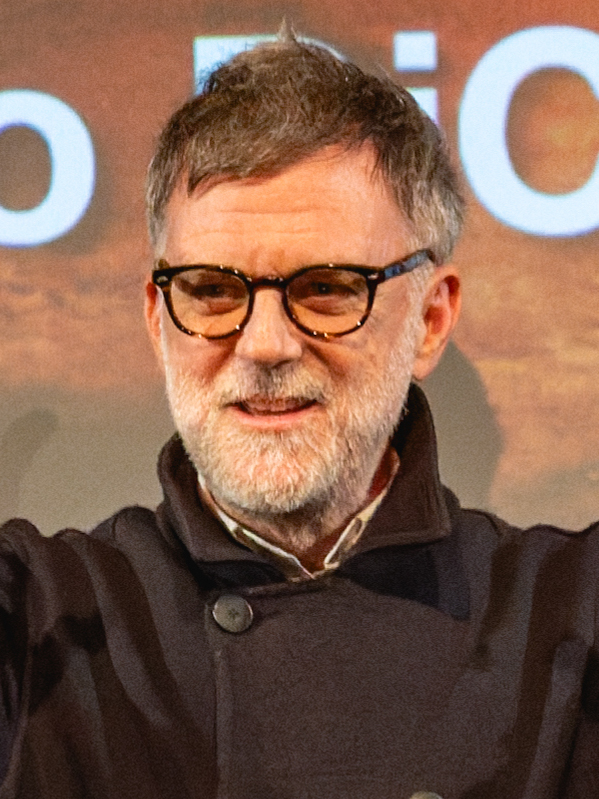
Paul Thomas Anderson, Best Director and Best Adapted Screenplay winner

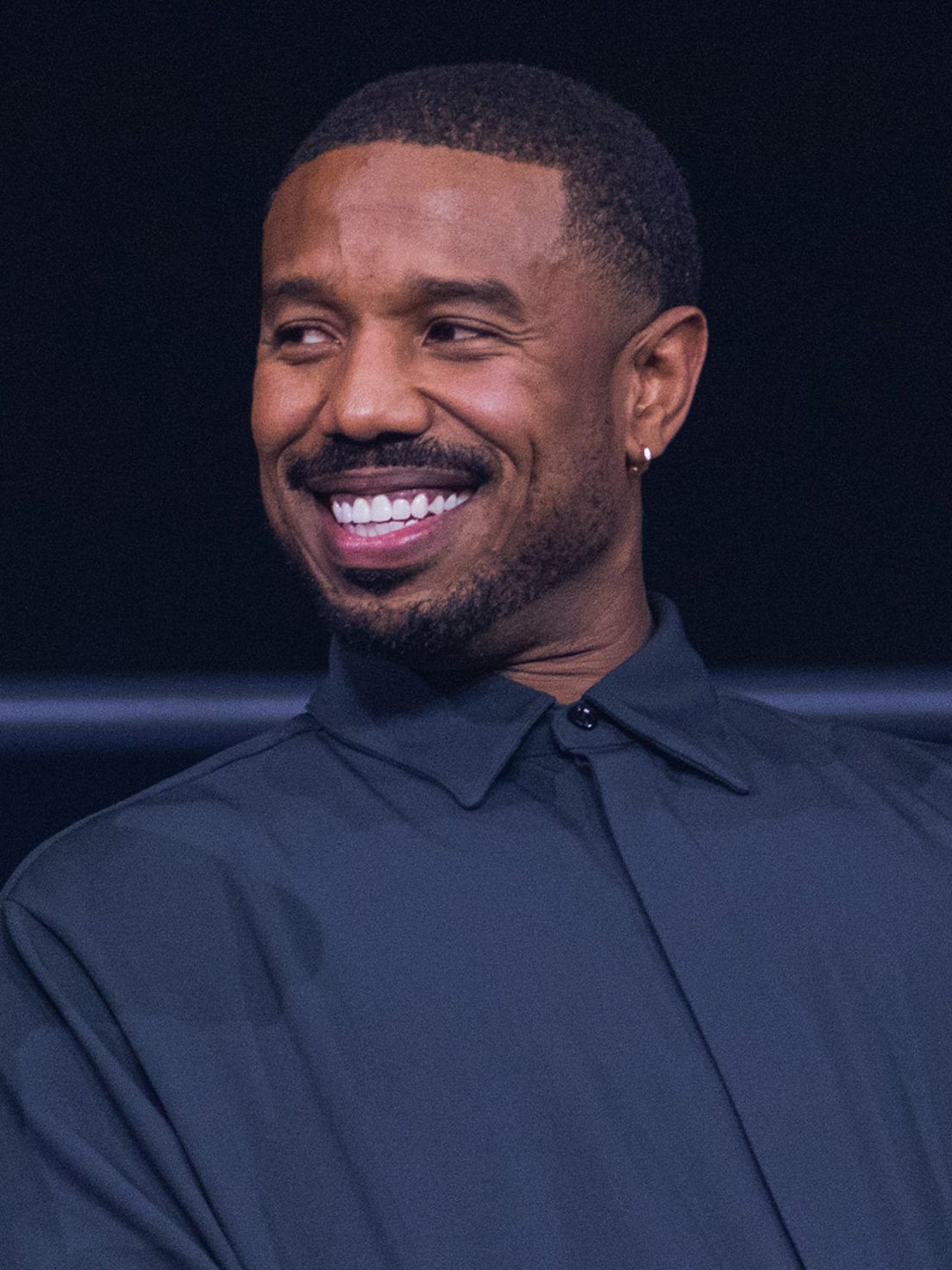
Michael B. Jordan, Best Actor winner

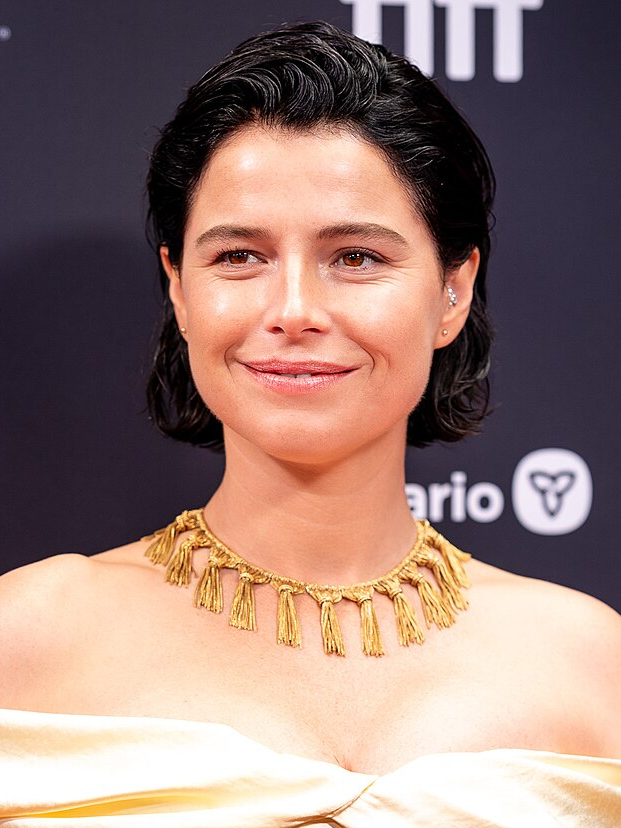
Jessie Buckley, Best Actress winner

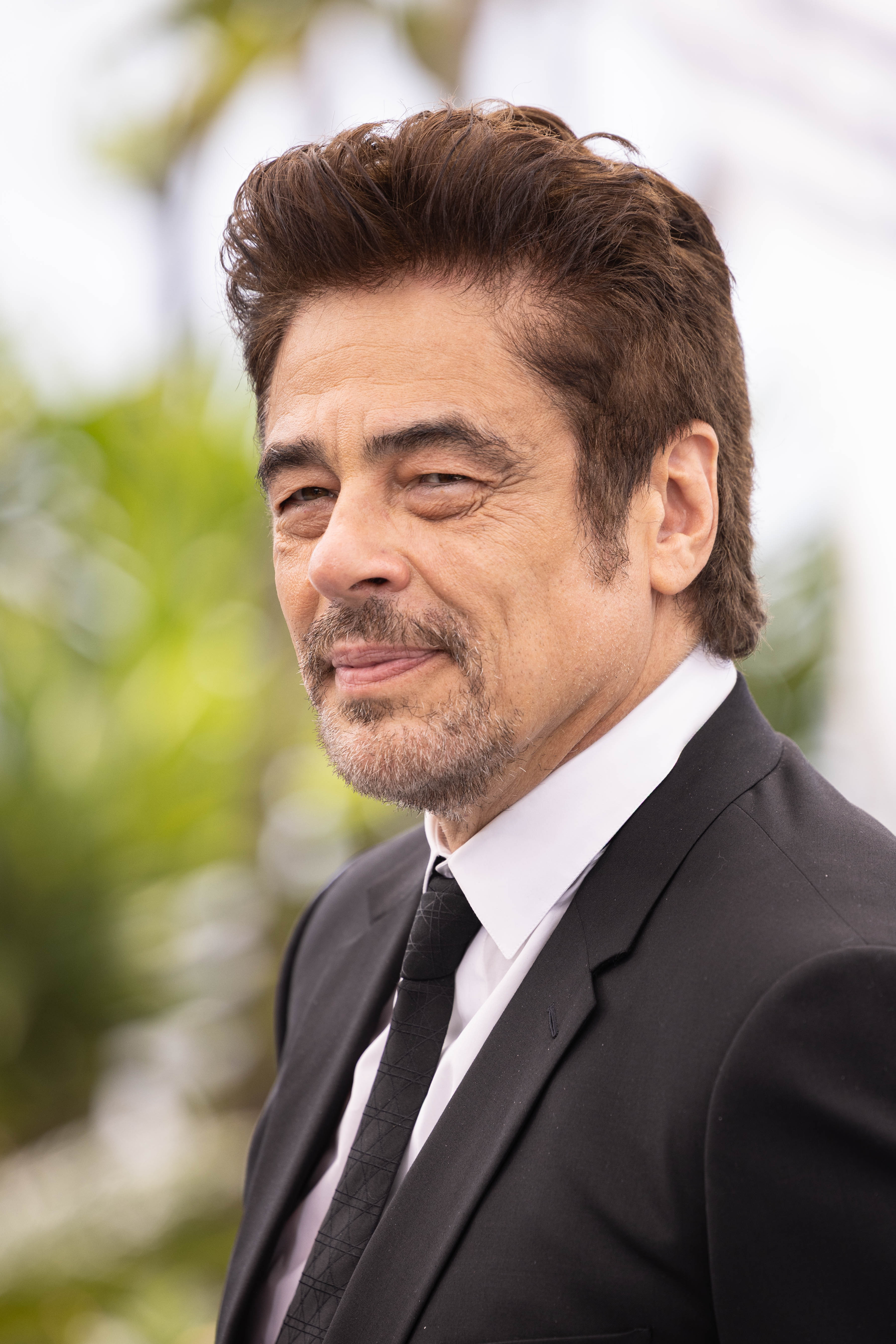
Benicio del Toro, Best Supporting Actor winner

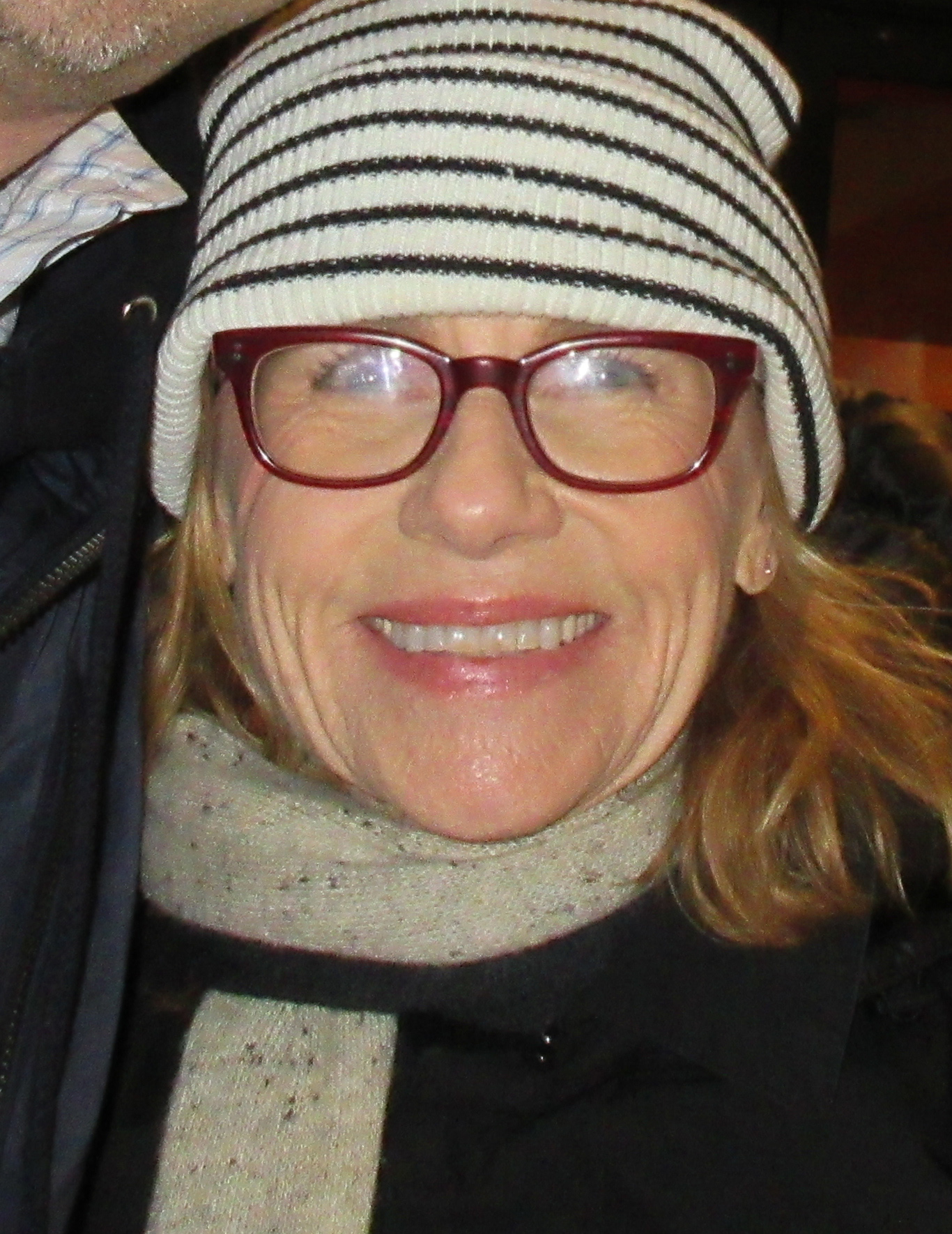
Amy Madigan, Best Supporting Actress winner

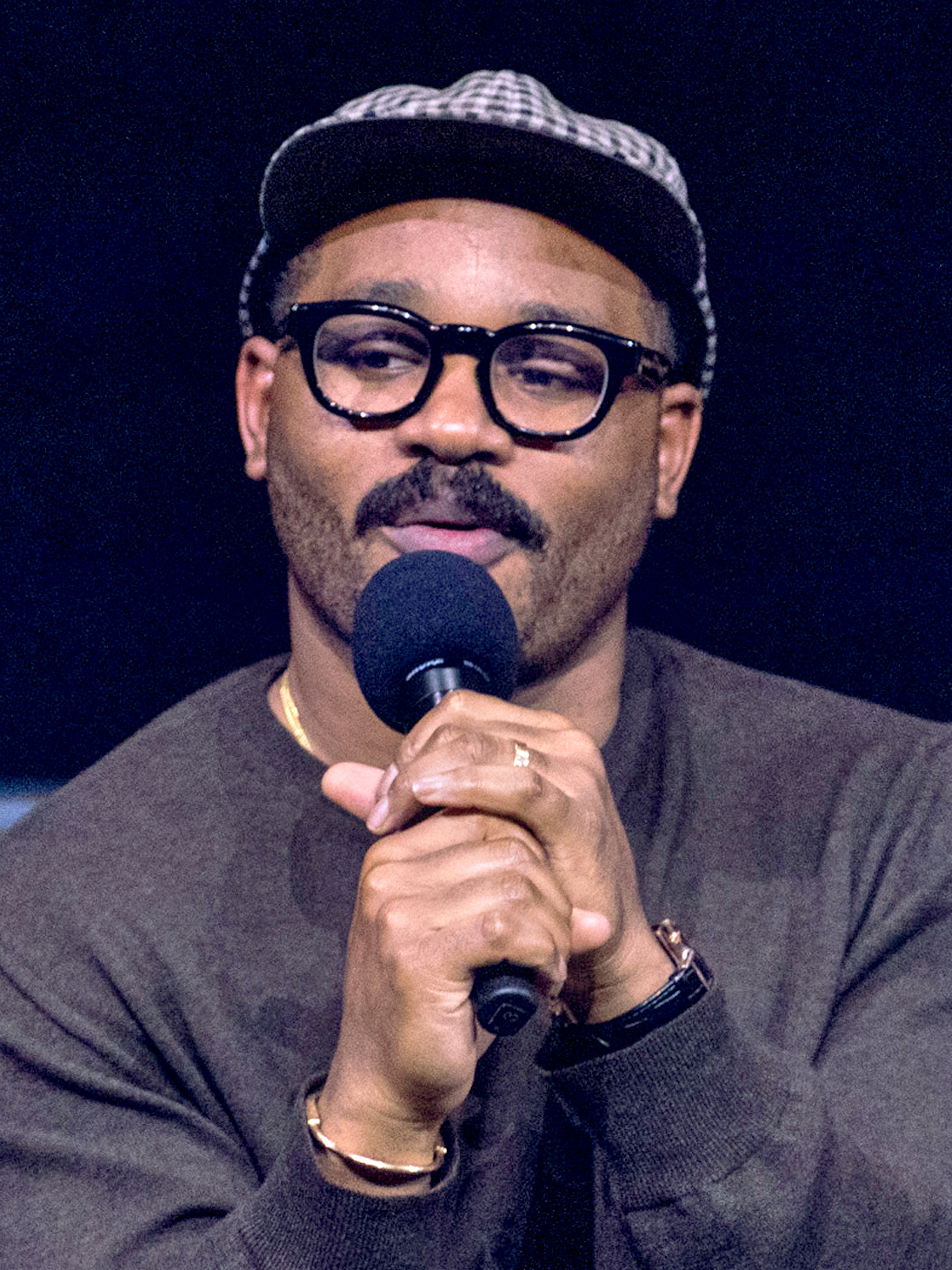
Ryan Coogler, Best Original Screenplay winner

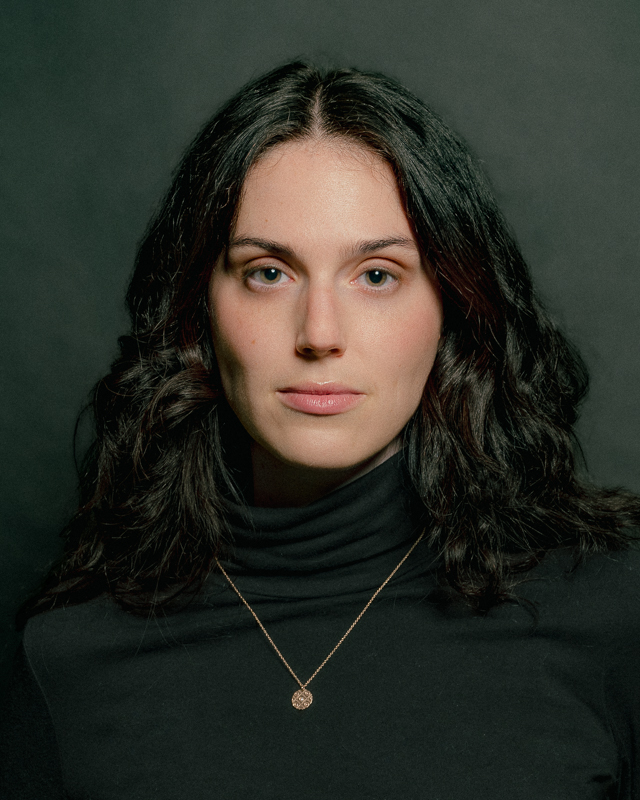
Eva Victor, Best Debut Feature winner

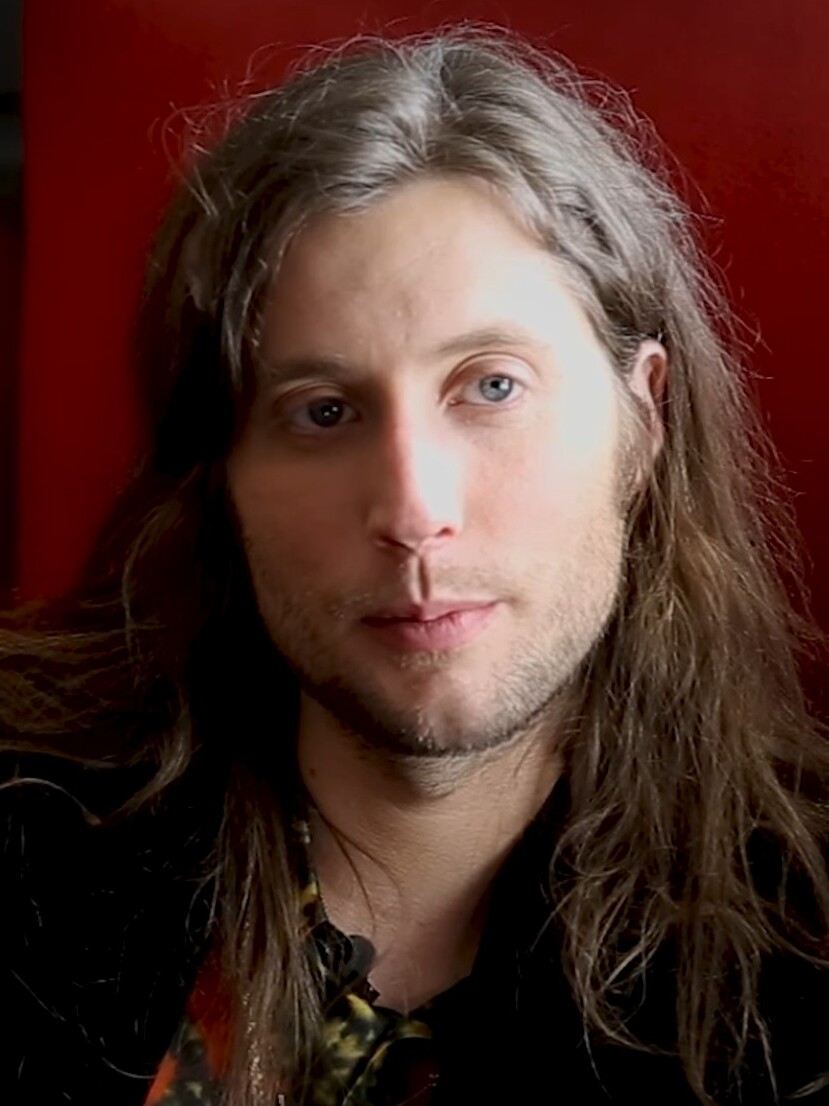
Ludwig Göransson, Best Original Score winner

| Best Picture | Best Director |
|---|---|
| 1. One Battle After Another; 2. Sinners; 3. Sentimental Value; 4. It Was Just an Accident; 5. The Secret Agent; 6. Marty Supreme; 7. Weapons; 8. No Other Choice; 9. Hamnet; 10. Train Dreams | Paul Thomas Anderson – One Battle After Another; Ryan Coogler – Sinners; Jafar Panahi – It Was Just an Accident; Josh Safdie – Marty Supreme; Chloé Zhao – Hamnet |
| Best Actor | Best Actress |
| Michael B. Jordan – Sinners as Elijah "Smoke" Moore / Elias "Stack" Moore; Timothée Chalamet – Marty Supreme as Marty Mauser; Leonardo DiCaprio – One Battle After Another as Bob Ferguson; Ethan Hawke – Blue Moon as Lorenz Hart; Wagner Moura – The Secret Agent as Marcelo Alves / Armando Solimões / Fernando Solimões | Jessie Buckley – Hamnet as Agnes Shakespeare; Rose Byrne – If I Had Legs I'd Kick You as Linda; Renate Reinsve – Sentimental Value as Nora Borg; Amanda Seyfried – The Testament of Ann Lee as Ann Lee; Emma Stone – Bugonia as Michelle Fuller |
| Best Supporting Actor | Best Supporting Actress |
| Benicio del Toro – One Battle After Another as Sensei Sergio St. Carlos; Jacob Elordi – Frankenstein as The Creature; Delroy Lindo – Sinners as Delta Slim; Sean Penn – One Battle After Another as Col. Steven J. Lockjaw; Stellan Skarsgård – Sentimental Value as Gustav Borg | Amy Madigan – Weapons as Gladys; Elle Fanning – Sentimental Value as Rachel Kemp; Inga Ibsdotter Lilleaas – Sentimental Value as Agnes Borg Pettersen; Wunmi Mosaku – Sinners as Annie; Teyana Taylor – One Battle After Another as Perfidia Beverly Hills |
| Best Animated Feature | Best Film Not in the English Language |
| KPop Demon Hunters; Arco; Elio; Little Amélie or the Character of Rain; Zootopia 2 | Sentimental Value; It Was Just an Accident; No Other Choice; The Secret Agent; Sirāt |
| Best Documentary | Best Debut Feature |
| The Perfect Neighbor; 2000 Meters to Andriivka; The Alabama Solution; Cover-Up; Orwell: 2+2=5 | Eva Victor – Sorry, Baby; Andrew DeYoung – Friendship; Carson Lund – Eephus; Charlie Polinger – The Plague; Kristen Stewart – The Chronology of Water |
| Best Original Screenplay | Best Adapted Screenplay |
| Sinners – Ryan Coogler; It Was Just an Accident – Jafar Panahi; Marty Supreme – Ronald Bronstein and Josh Safdie; Sentimental Value – Eskil Vogt and Joachim Trier; Weapons – Zach Cregger | One Battle After Another – Paul Thomas Anderson; Bugonia – Will Tracy; Hamnet – Chloé Zhao and Maggie O'Farrell; No Other Choice – Park Chan-wook, Lee Kyoung-mi, Don McKellar, and Lee Ja-hye; Train Dreams – Clint Bentley and Greg Kwedar |
| Best Cinematography | Best Editing |
| Sinners – Autumn Durald Arkapaw; Frankenstein – Dan Laustsen; Hamnet – Łukasz Żal; One Battle After Another – Michael Bauman; Train Dreams – Adolpho Veloso | One Battle After Another – Andy Jurgensen; F1 – Stephen Mirrione; Marty Supreme – Ronald Bronstein and Josh Safdie; No Other Choice – Kim Sang-bum and Kim Ho-bin; Sinners – Michael P. Shawver |
| Best Ensemble & Casting | Best Original Score |
| Sinners; Marty Supreme; One Battle After Another; Sentimental Value; Wake Up Dead Man: A Knives Out Mystery | Sinners – Ludwig Göransson; Frankenstein – Alexandre Desplat; Marty Supreme – Daniel Lopatin; One Battle After Another – Jonny Greenwood; Sirāt – Kangding Ray |
| Best Costume Design | Best Production Design |
| Sinners – Ruth E. Carter; Frankenstein – Kate Hawley; Hamnet – Malgosia Turzanska; Marty Supreme – Miyako Bellizzi; Wicked: For Good – Paul Tazewell | Sinners – Hannah Beachler and Monique Champagne; Frankenstein – Tamara Deverell and Shane Vieau; Hamnet – Fiona Crombie and Alice Felton; Marty Supreme – Jack Fisk and Adam Willis; Wicked: For Good – Nathan Crowley and Lee Sandales |
| Best Makeup & Hairstyling | Best Choreography (Dance & Stunt) |
| Frankenstein – Mike Hill, Jordan Samuel, and Cliona Furey; Sinners – Siân Richards, Ken Diaz, Mike Fontaine, and Shunika Terry; The Ugly Stepsister – Anne Cathrine Sauerberg and Thomas Foldberg; Weapons – Leo Satkovich, Melizah Wheat, and Jason Collins; Wicked: For Good – Frances Hannon, Mark Coulier, and Laura Blount | Sinners – Andy Gill; Mission: Impossible – The Final Reckoning – Wade Eastwood; One Battle After Another – Brian Machleit; The Testament of Ann Lee – Celia Rowlson-Hall; Wicked: For Good – Christopher Scott |
| Best Sound Design | Best Visual Effects |
| Sinners – Chris Welcker, Benny Burtt, Brandon Proctor, Steve Boeddeker, Felipe Pacheco, and David V. Butler; Avatar: Fire and Ash – Brent Burge, Alexis Feodoroff, Michael Hedges, Julian Howarth, Gary Summers, and Gwendolyn Yates Whittle; F1 – Al Nelson, Gwendolyn Yates Whittle, Gary A. Rizzo, Juan Peralta, and Gareth John; One Battle After Another – José Antonio García, Christopher Scarabosio, and Tony Villaflor; Sirāt – Laia Casanovas, Yasmina Praderas, and Amanda Villavieja | Sinners – Michael Ralla, Espen Nordahl, Guido Wolter, and Donnie Dean; Avatar: Fire and Ash – Joe Letteri, Richard Baneham, Eric Saindon, and Daniel Barrett; F1 – Ryan Tudhope, Nikeah Forde, Robert Harrington, Nicolas Chevallier, Eric Leven, Edward Price, and Keith Dawson; Frankenstein – Dennis Berardi, Ayo Burgess, Ivan Busquets, and José Granell; Superman – Stéphane Ceretti, Enrico Damm, Stéphane Nazé, and Guy Williams |

== Special awards ==
=== Lifetime Achievement Awards ===
- Colleen Atwood
- Walter Murch
- Jack Nicholson
- Steven Spielberg
- Vittorio Storaro

=== Special Achievement Awards ===
- Film Workers for Palestine, for drawing attention to the ethical compromises being made within the film industry and fighting for organizations to support Palestine and acknowledge the current genocide
- Green Film, for developing and certifying sustainability criteria to be adopted to reduce the environmental impact of an audiovisual production to a minimum but without slowing down the cast and crew's work

=== Non-U.S. Releases ===
- Aki (dir. Darlene Naponse, Canada)
- Copper (dir. Nicolás Pereda, Mexico)
- The Good Sister (dir. Sarah Miro Fischer, Germany)
- Home Sweet Home (dir. Frelle Petersen, Denmark)
- Levers (dir. Rhayne Vermette, Canada)
- Meadowlarks (dir. Tasha Hubbard, Canada)
- Nino (dir. Pauline Loquès, France)
- Phantoms of July (dir. Julian Radlmaier, Germany)
- Punku (dir. J. D. Fernández Molero, Peru)
- Two Pianos (dir. Arnaud Desplechin, France)

== Films with multiple nominations and awards ==
Films that received multiple nominations
| Nominations | Film |
|---|---|
| 16 | Sinners |
| 13 | One Battle After Another |
| 9 | Marty Supreme |
| 8 | Sentimental Value |
| 7 | Frankenstein |
| 7 | Hamnet |
| 4 | It Was Just an Accident |
| 4 | No Other Choice |
| 4 | Weapons |
| 4 | Wicked: For Good |
| 3 | F1 |
| 3 | The Secret Agent |
| 3 | Sirāt |
| 3 | Train Dreams |
| 2 | Avatar: Fire and Ash |
| 2 | Bugonia |
| 2 | The Testament of Ann Lee |

Films that received multiple awards
| Awards | Film |
|---|---|
| 10 | Sinners |
| 5 | One Battle After Another |
