= 30th Satellite Awards =

2026 awards ceremony for film and television

- Date: March 10, 2026

Highlights
- Most wins: Film: Hamnet / One Battle After Another (3); Television: Andor / Pluribus / The White Lotus (2)
- Most nominations: Film: Sinners (14); Television: The White Lotus (5)
- Best Motion Picture – Drama: Hamnet
- Best Motion Picture – Comedy or Musical: Marty Supreme
- Best Television Series – Drama: Pluribus
- Best Television Series – Comedy or Musical: Platonic
- Best Miniseries & Limited Series or Motion Picture Made for Television: Adolescence

The 30th Satellite Awards is an awards ceremony honoring the year's outstanding performers, films and television series, presented by the International Press Academy.

The nominations were announced on December 16, 2025. The winners were announced on March 10, 2026, with the awards presentation postponed for a later date "due to the current global situation and ongoing war with Iran".

Ryan Coogler's period supernatural horror film Sinners led the film nominations with fourteen, followed by One Battle After Another with twelve; Frankenstein and Hamnet received ten nominations apiece. For the television categories, The White Lotus received the most nominations with five.

Additionally, the Norwegian drama film Sentimental Value became part of an exclusive club, earning a Best Motion Picture nomination for both domestic and international categories.

== Special achievement awards ==
- Auteur Award (for singular vision and unique artistic control over the elements of production) – Michelle Danner
- Honorary Satellite Award – Billy Bob Thornton
- Humanitarian Award (for making a difference in the lives of those in the artistic community and beyond) – Gary Sinise
- Mary Pickford Award (for outstanding artistic contribution to the entertainment industry) – Antonio Banderas
- Nikola Tesla Award (for visionary achievement in filmmaking technology) – Dan Laustsen
- Breakthrough Performance Award – Chase Infiniti
- Stunt Performance Award – Wade Eastwood
- Ensemble: Motion Picture – Wake Up Dead Man: A Knives Out Mystery
- Ensemble: Television – Landman

== Motion picture winners and nominees ==
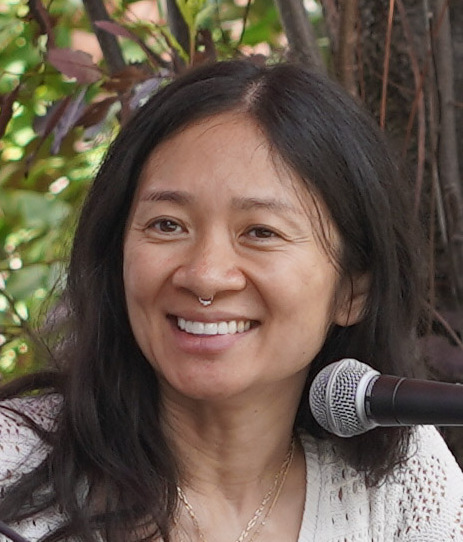
Chloé Zhao, Best Director winner

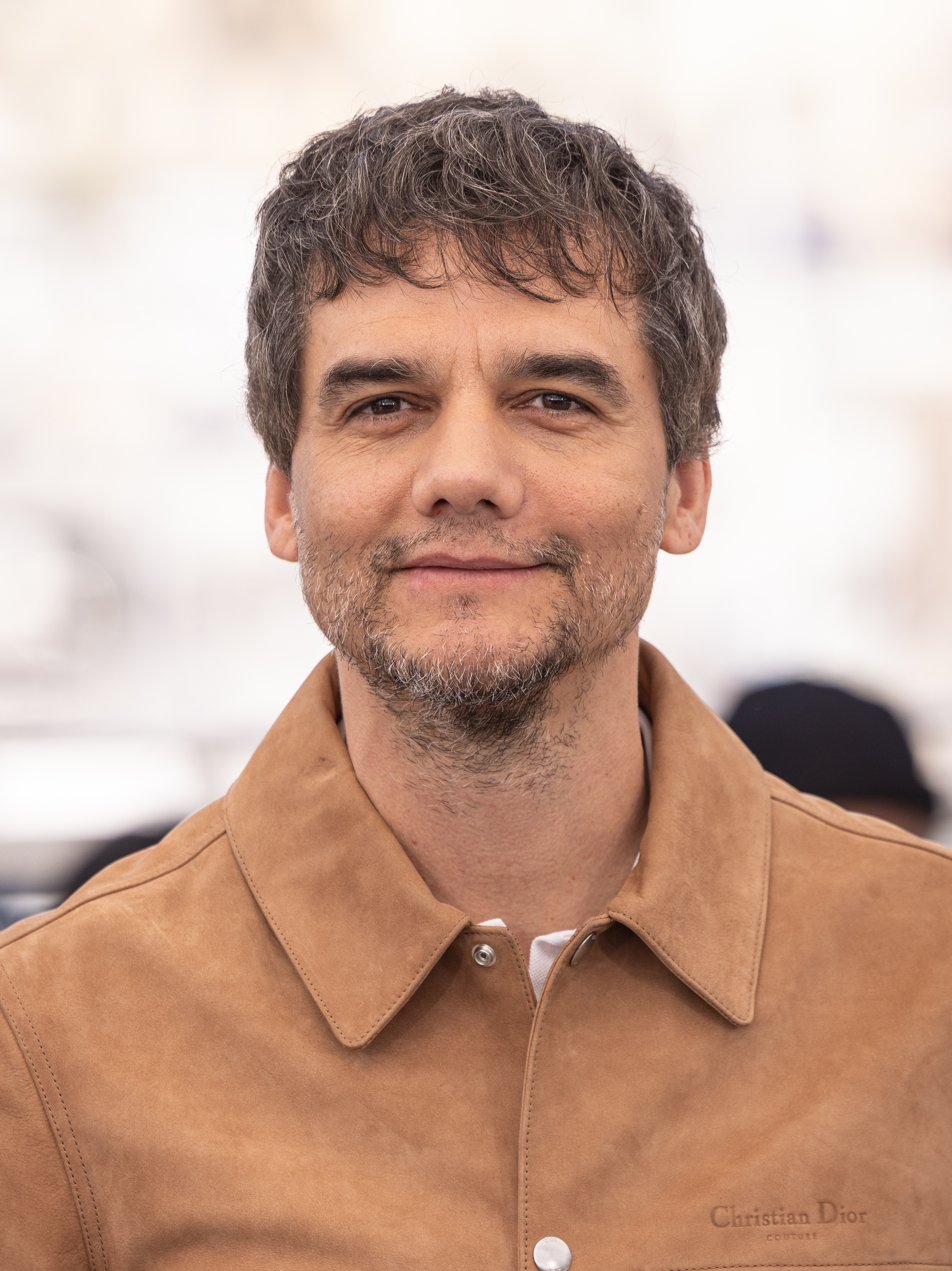
Wagner Moura, Best Actor in a Motion Picture – Drama winner

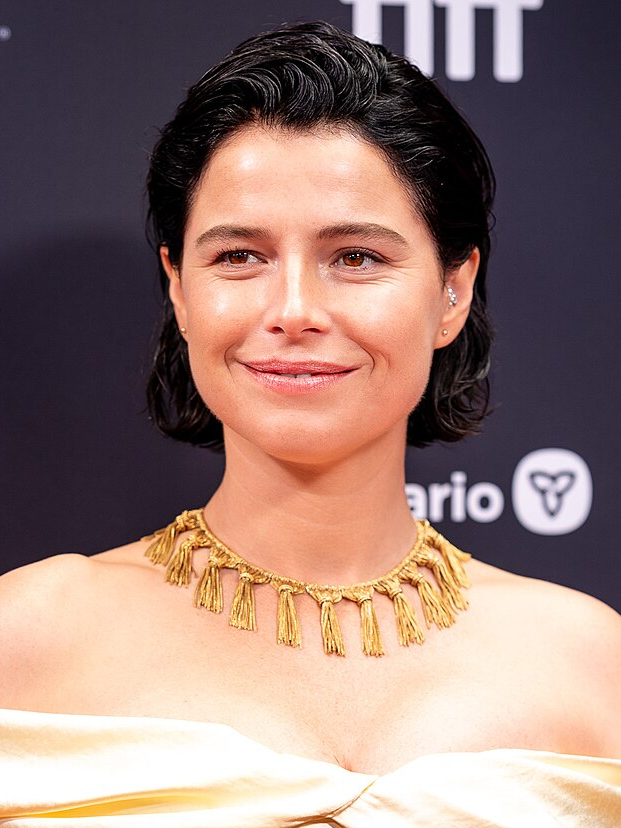
Jessie Buckley, Best Actress in a Motion Picture – Drama winner

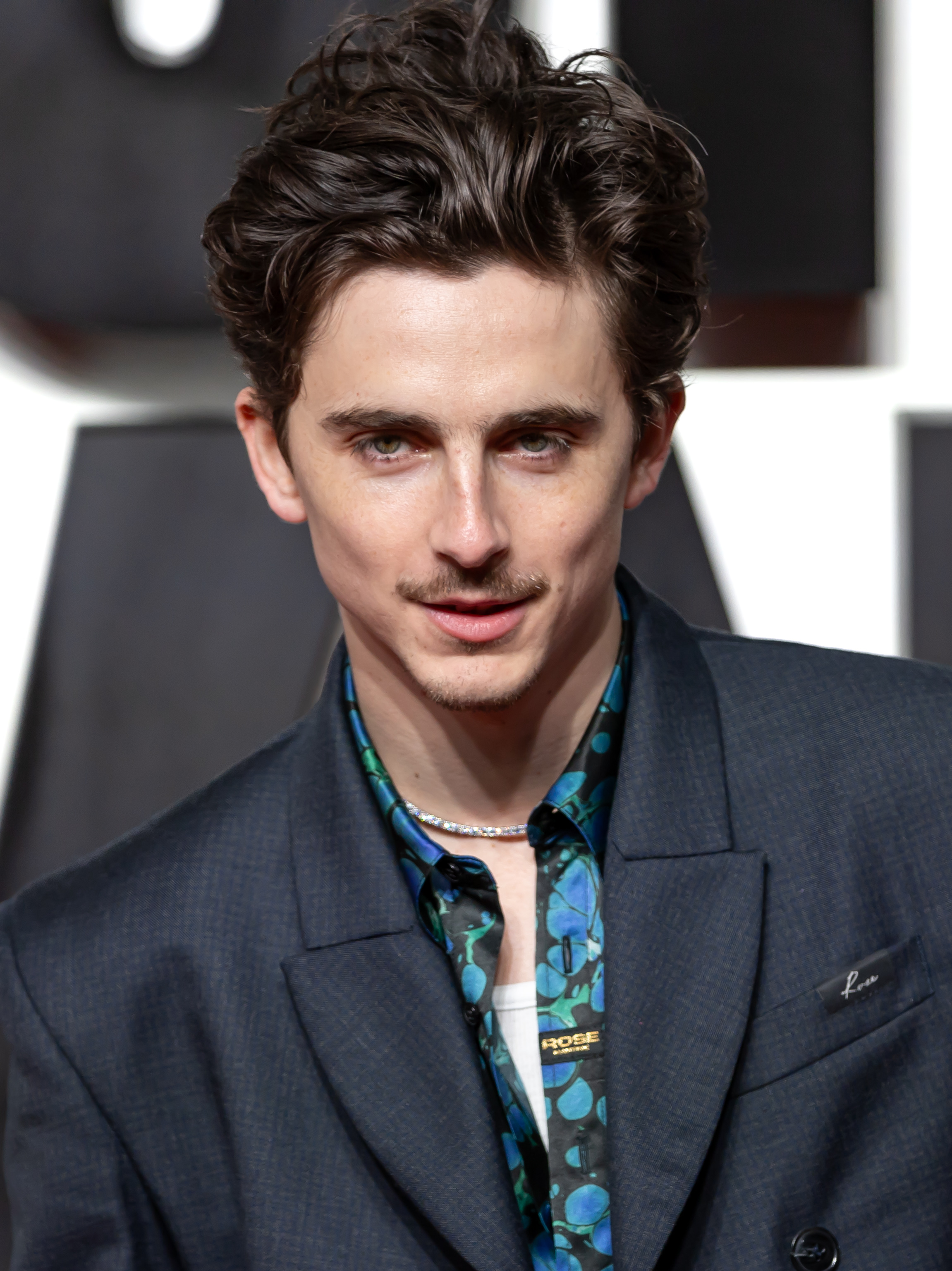
Timothée Chalamet, Best Actor in a Motion Picture – Comedy or Musical winner

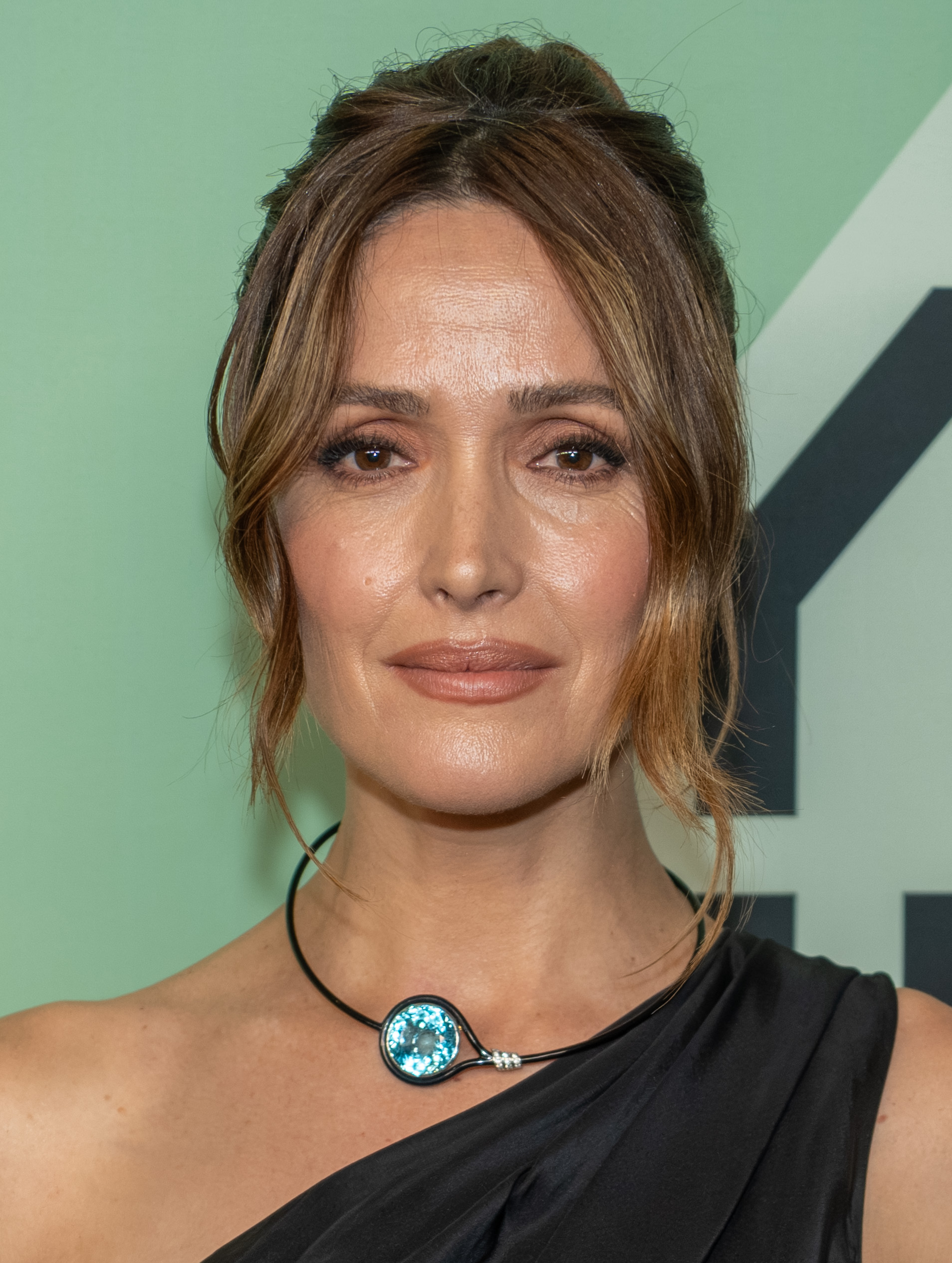
Rose Byrne, Best Actress in a Motion Picture – Comedy or Musical winner

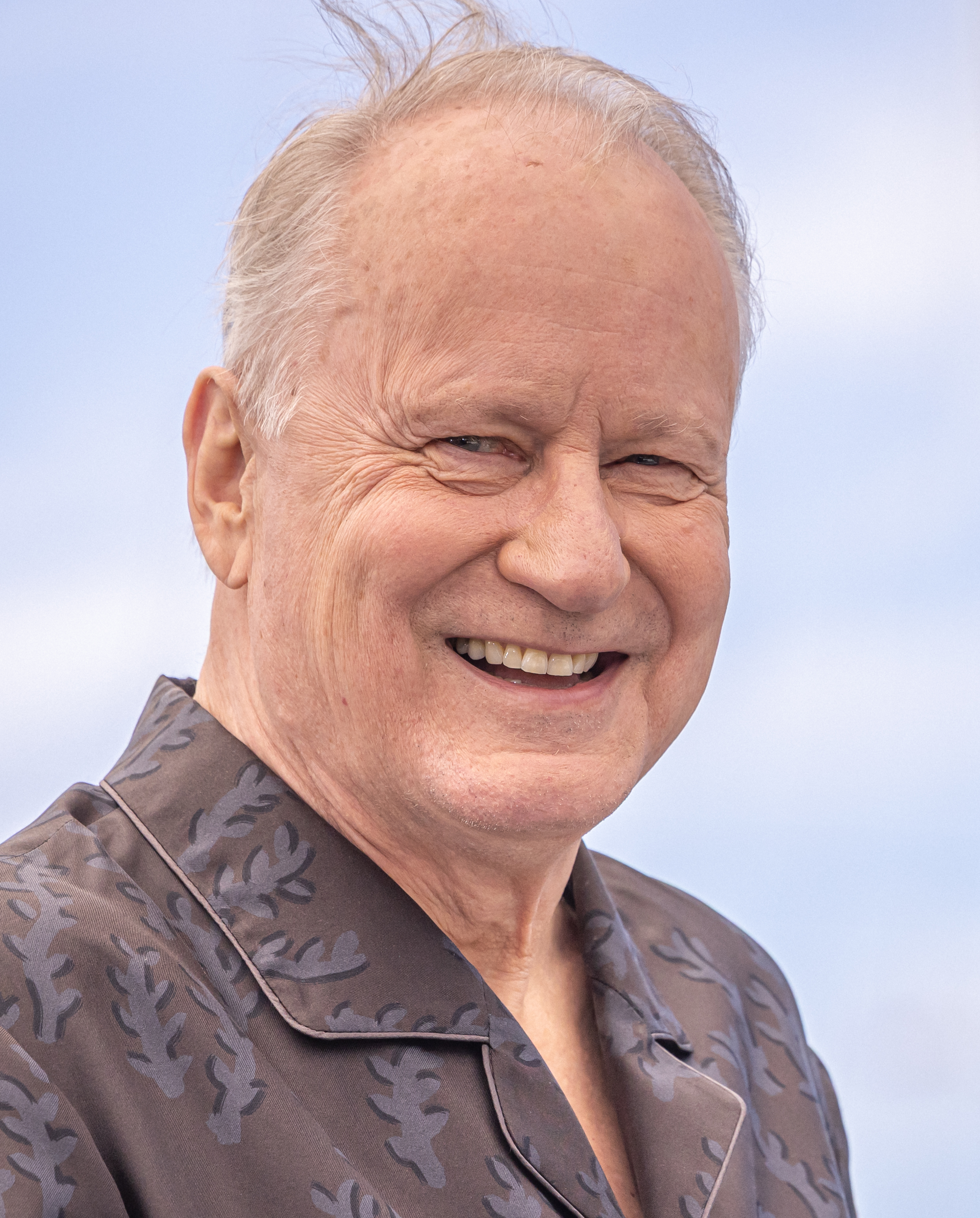
Stellan Skarsgård, Best Actor in a Supporting Role winner

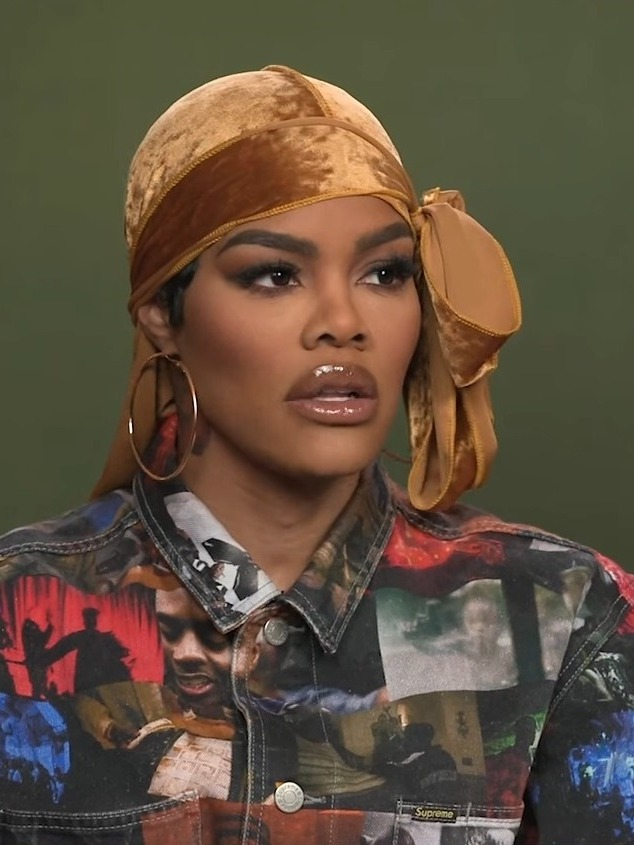
Teyana Taylor, Best Actress in a Supporting Role winner

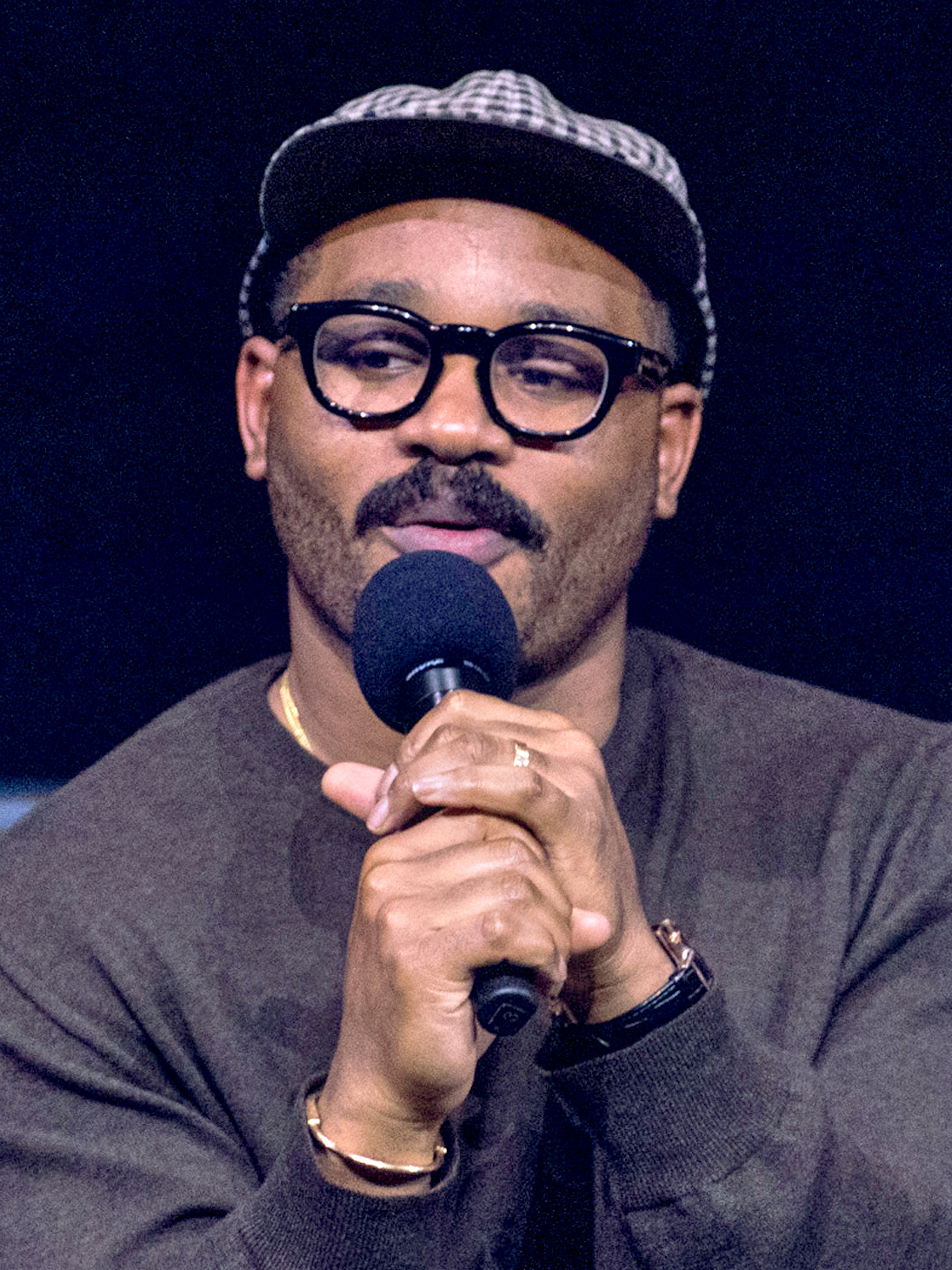
Ryan Coogler, Best Original Screenplay winner

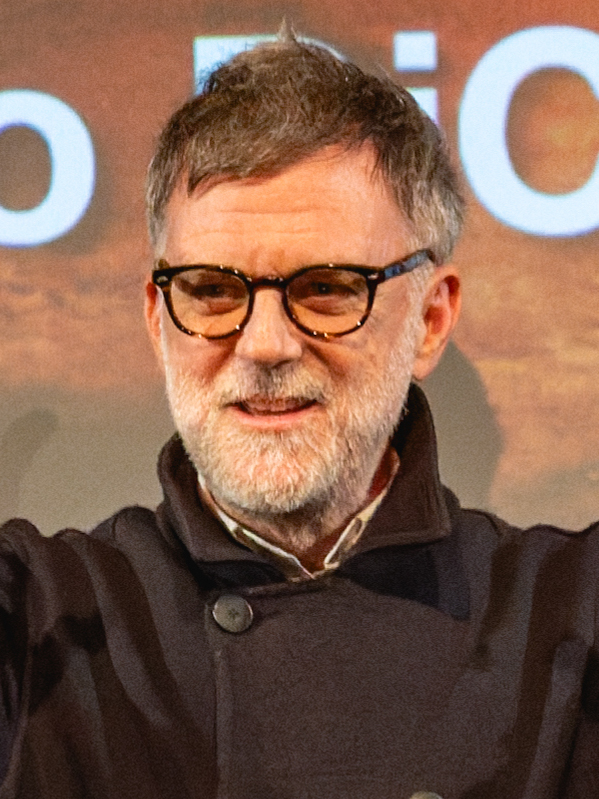
Paul Thomas Anderson, Best Adapted Screenplay winner

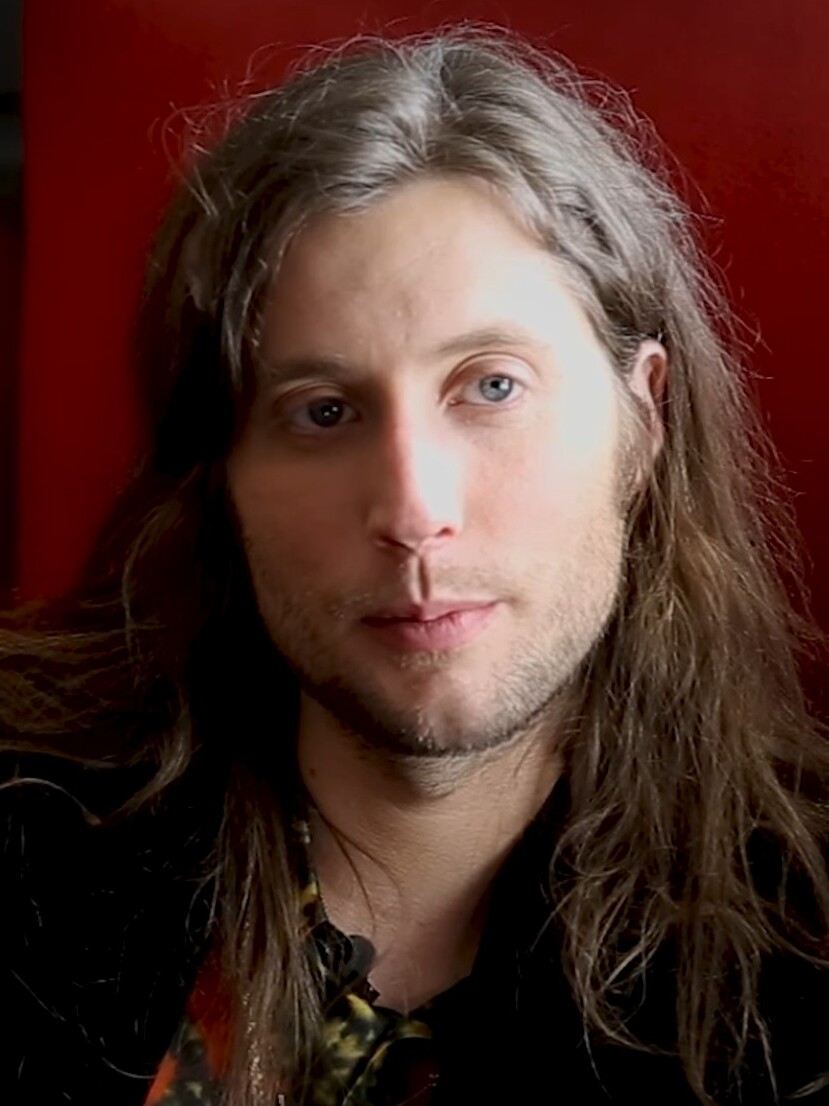
Ludwig Göransson, Best Original Score winner

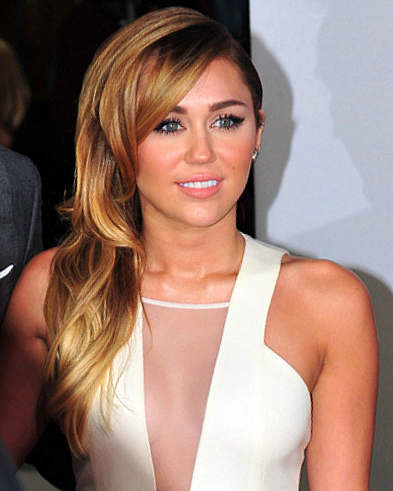
Miley Cyrus, Best Original Song co-winner

Winners are listed first and highlighted in bold.

Best Motion Picture – Drama	Best Motion Picture – Comedy or Musical
**Hamnet**; Avatar: Fire and Ash; Frankenstein; One Battle After Another; Sentimental Value; Sinners; Train Dreams	**Marty Supreme**; Bugonia; Father Mother Sister Brother; Nouvelle Vague; Novocaine; Sorry, Baby
Best Motion Picture – Animated or Mixed Media	Best Director
**Elio**; Arco; KPop Demon Hunters; Little Amélie or the Character of Rain; Zootopia 2	**Chloé Zhao – Hamnet**; Paul Thomas Anderson – One Battle After Another; James Cameron – Avatar: Fire and Ash; Ryan Coogler – Sinners; Guillermo del Toro – Frankenstein; Jafar Panahi – It Was Just an Accident; Joachim Trier – Sentimental Value
Best Actor in a Motion Picture – Drama	Best Actress in a Motion Picture – Drama
**Wagner Moura – The Secret Agent as Marcelo Alves / Armando Solimões / Fernando Solimões**; Leonardo DiCaprio – One Battle After Another as Bob Ferguson; Joel Edgerton – Train Dreams as Robert Grainier; Oscar Isaac – Frankenstein as Victor Frankenstein; Michael B. Jordan – Sinners as Elijah "Smoke" Moore / Elias "Stack" Moore	**Jessie Buckley – Hamnet as Agnes Shakespeare**; Leonie Benesch – Late Shift as Floria; Chase Infiniti – One Battle After Another as Willa Ferguson; Diane Lane – Anniversary as Ellen Taylor; Renate Reinsve – Sentimental Value as Nora Borg
Best Actor in a Motion Picture – Comedy or Musical	Best Actress in a Motion Picture – Comedy or Musical
**Timothée Chalamet – Marty Supreme as Marty Mauser**; George Clooney – Jay Kelly as Jay Kelly; Ethan Hawke – Blue Moon as Lorenz Hart; Liam Neeson – The Naked Gun as Lt. Frank Drebin Jr.; Jesse Plemons – Bugonia as Teddy Gatz	**Rose Byrne – If I Had Legs I'd Kick You as Linda**; Cynthia Erivo – Wicked: For Good as Elphaba Thropp; Emma Stone – Bugonia as Michelle Fuller; Eva Victor – Sorry, Baby as Agnes Ward
Best Actor in a Supporting Role	Best Actress in a Supporting Role
**Stellan Skarsgård – Sentimental Value as Gustav Borg**; Benicio del Toro – One Battle After Another as Sensei Sergio St. Carlos; Jacob Elordi – Frankenstein as The Creature; Paul Mescal – Hamnet as William Shakespeare; Sean Penn – One Battle After Another as Col. Steven J. Lockjaw	**Teyana Taylor – One Battle After Another as Perfidia Beverly Hills**; Elle Fanning – Sentimental Value as Rachel Kemp; Ariana Grande – Wicked: For Good as Galinda "Glinda" Upland; Inga Ibsdotter Lilleaas – Sentimental Value as Agnes Borg Pettersen; Amy Madigan – Weapons as Gladys; Wunmi Mosaku – Sinners as Annie
Best Original Screenplay	Best Adapted Screenplay
**Sinners – Ryan Coogler**; It Was Just an Accident – Jafar Panahi; Jay Kelly – Noah Baumbach and Emily Mortimer; Marty Supreme – Ronald Bronstein and Josh Safdie; Sentimental Value – Eskil Vogt and Joachim Trier	**One Battle After Another – Paul Thomas Anderson; based on the novel Vineland by Thomas Pynchon**; Bugonia – Will Tracy; based on the film Save the Green Planet! written by Jang Joon-hwan; Hamnet – Chloé Zhao; based on the novel by Maggie O'Farrell; No Other Choice – Park Chan-wook, Lee Kyoung-mi, Don McKellar, and Lee Ja-hye; based on the novel The Ax by Donald E. Westlake; Train Dreams – Clint Bentley and Greg Kwedar; based on the novella by Denis Johnson
Best Motion Picture – Documentary	Best Motion Picture – International
**Becoming Led Zeppelin**; 2000 Meters to Andriivka; The Alabama Solution; Come See Me in the Good Light; Cover-Up; Deaf President Now!; The Librarians; Ocean with David Attenborough; Orwell: 2+2=5; The Perfect Neighbor	**The Secret Agent (Brazil)**; It Was Just an Accident (France); Late Shift (Switzerland); Little Trouble Girls (Slovenia); No Other Choice (South Korea); Sentimental Value (Norway); Sirāt (Spain); The Voice of Hind Rajab (Tunisia)
Best Cinematography	Best Film Editing
**Train Dreams – Adolpho Veloso**; F1 – Claudio Miranda; Frankenstein – Dan Laustsen; Hamnet – Łukasz Żal; One Battle After Another – Michael Bauman; Sinners – Autumn Durald Arkapaw	**One Battle After Another – Andy Jurgensen**; F1 – Stephen Mirrione; Hamnet – Affonso Gonçalves and Chloé Zhao; A House of Dynamite – Kirk Baxter; Marty Supreme – Ronald Bronstein and Josh Safdie; Sinners – Michael P. Shawver
Best Costume Design	Best Production Design
**Frankenstein – Kate Hawley**; Hamnet – Malgosia Turzanska; Marty Supreme – Miyako Bellizzi; Sinners – Ruth E. Carter; Wicked: For Good – Paul Tazewell	**Frankenstein – Tamara Deverell and Shane Vieau**; Avatar: Fire and Ash – Dylan Cole and Ben Procter; Hamnet – Fiona Crombie and Alice Felton; Marty Supreme – Jack Fisk and Adam Willis; Sinners – Hannah Beachler and Monique Champagne; Wicked: For Good – Nathan Crowley and Lee Sandales
Best Original Score	Best Original Song
**Sinners – Ludwig Göransson**; F1 – Hans Zimmer; Frankenstein – Alexandre Desplat; Hamnet – Max Richter; A House of Dynamite – Volker Bertelmann; One Battle After Another – Jonny Greenwood	**"Dream as One" from Avatar: Fire and Ash – Miley Cyrus, Andrew Wyatt, Mark Ronson, and Simon Franglen**; "The Girl in the Bubble" from Wicked: For Good – Stephen Schwartz; "Golden" from KPop Demon Hunters – Joong Gyu Kwak, Yu Han Lee, Hee Dong Nam, Jeong Hoon Seo, Park Hong Jun, Kim Eun-jae (EJAE), and Mark Sonnenblick; "I Lied to You" from Sinners – Ludwig Göransson and Raphael Saadiq; "No Place Like Home" from Wicked: For Good – Stephen Schwartz; "Train Dreams" from Train Dreams – Nick Cave and Bryce Dessner
Best Makeup & Hair	Best Sound (Editing and Mixing)
**Tron: Ares – Donald Mowat**; Bugonia – Torsten Witte, Liz Phillips, and Albert Elizondo; Frankenstein – Mike Hill, Jordan Samuel, and Cliona Furey; Sinners – Siân Richards, Ken Diaz, Mike Fontaine, and Shunika Terry; The Smashing Machine – Kazu Hiro, Felix Fox, and Mia Neal; Wicked: For Good – Frances Hannon, Mark Coulier, and Laura Blount	**F1 – Al Nelson, Gwendolyn Yates Whittle, Gary A. Rizzo, Juan Peralta, and Gareth John**; Avatar: Fire and Ash – Brent Burge, Alexis Feodoroff, Michael Hedges, Julian Howarth, Gary Summers, and Gwendolyn Yates Whittle; Mission: Impossible – The Final Reckoning – Chris Burdon, Lloyd Dudley, James H. Mather, Mark Taylor, and Cécile Tournesac; One Battle After Another – José Antonio García, Christopher Scarabosio, and Tony Villaflor; Sinners – Chris Welcker, Benny Burtt, Brandon Proctor, Steve Boeddeker, Felipe Pacheco, and David V. Butler; Wicked: For Good – Jack Dolman, Simon Hayes, John Marquis, Andy Nelson, and Nancy Nugent Title
Best Visual Effects
**Avatar: Fire and Ash – Joe Letteri, Richard Baneham, Eric Saindon, and Daniel Barrett**; F1 – Ryan Tudhope, Nikeah Forde, Robert Harrington, Nicolas Chevallier, Eric Leven, Edward Price, and Keith Dawson; Frankenstein – Dennis Berardi, Ayo Burgess, Ivan Busquets, and José Granell; Mission: Impossible – The Final Reckoning – Alex Wuttke, Ian Lowe, Jeff Sutherland, and Kirstin Hall; Sinners – Michael Ralla, Espen Nordahl, Guido Wolter, and Donnie Dean; Superman – Stéphane Ceretti, Enrico Damm, Stéphane Nazé, and Guy Williams

=== Films with multiple nominations ===
Nominations	Films
14	Sinners
12	One Battle After Another
10	Frankenstein
10	Hamnet
8	Sentimental Value
8	Wicked: For Good
6	Avatar: Fire and Ash
6	Marty Supreme
5	Bugonia
5	F1
5	Train Dreams
3	It Was Just an Accident
2	A House of Dynamite
2	Jay Kelly
2	KPop Demon Hunters
2	Late Shift
2	Mission: Impossible – The Final Reckoning
2	No Other Choice
2	The Secret Agent
2	Sorry, Baby

=== Films with multiple wins ===
Wins	Films
3	Hamnet
3	One Battle After Another
2	Avatar: Fire and Ash
2	Frankenstein
2	Marty Supreme
2	The Secret Agent
2	Sinners

== Television winners and nominees ==
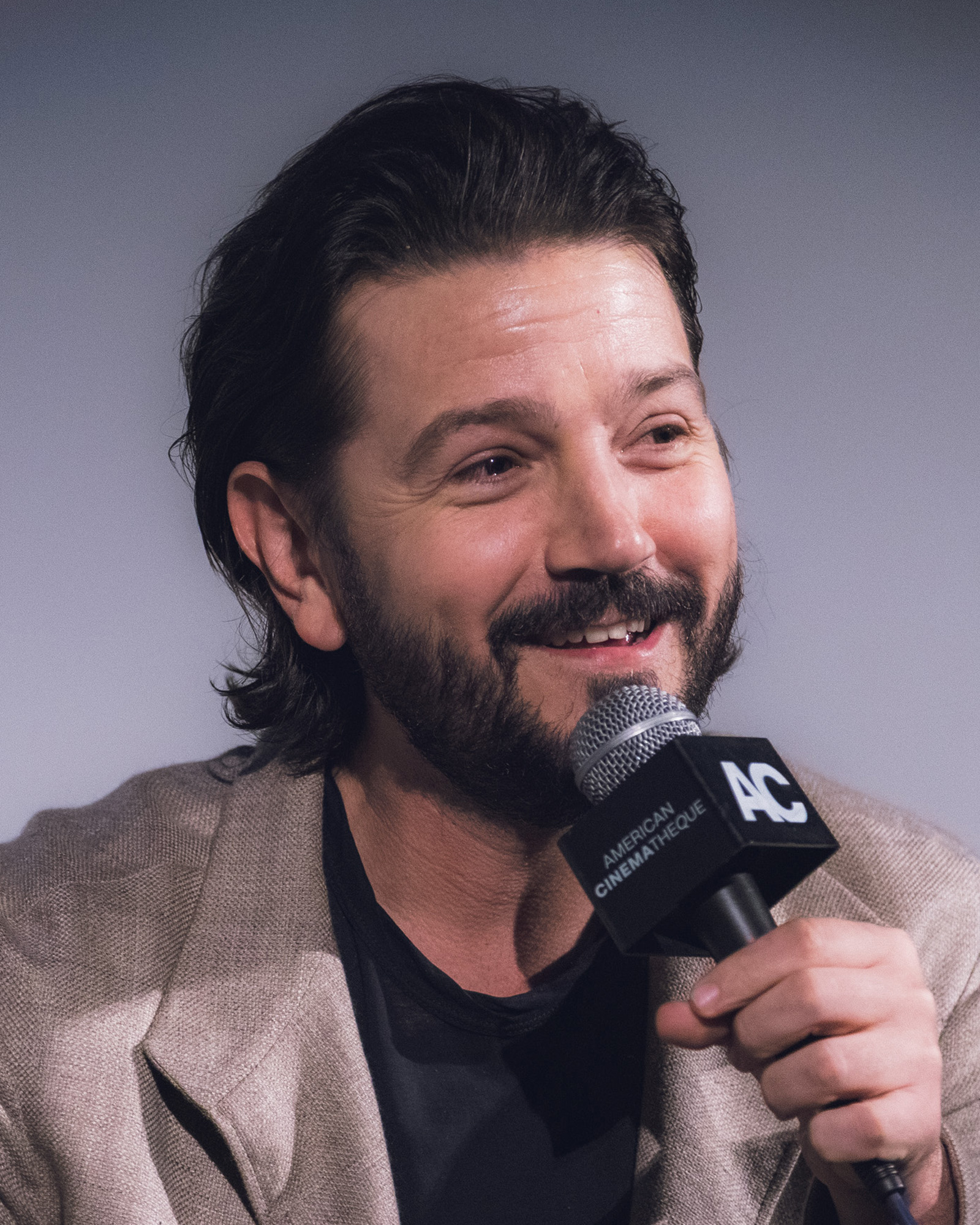
Diego Luna, Best Actor in a Drama or Genre Series winner

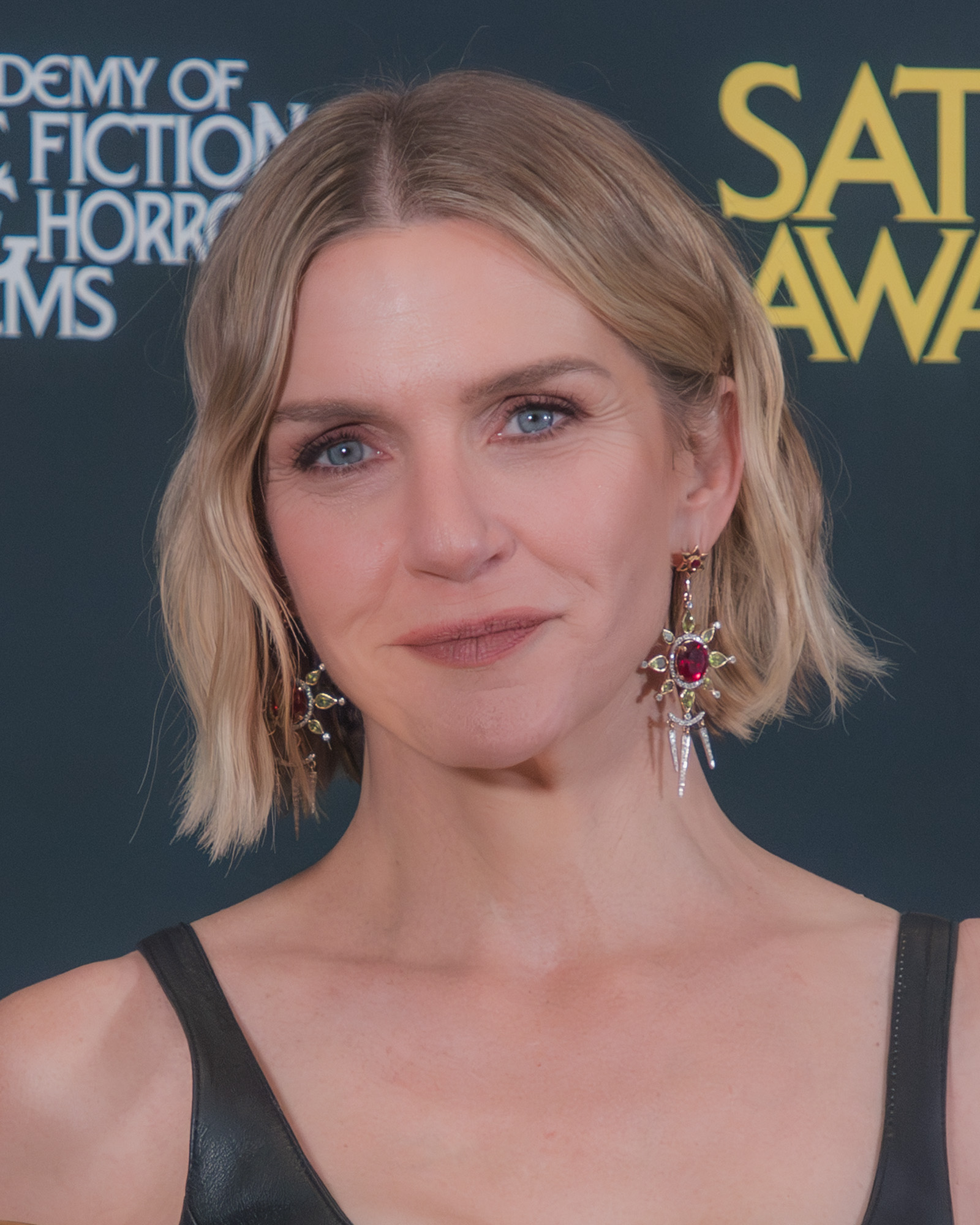
Rhea Seehorn, Best Actress in a Drama or Genre Series winner

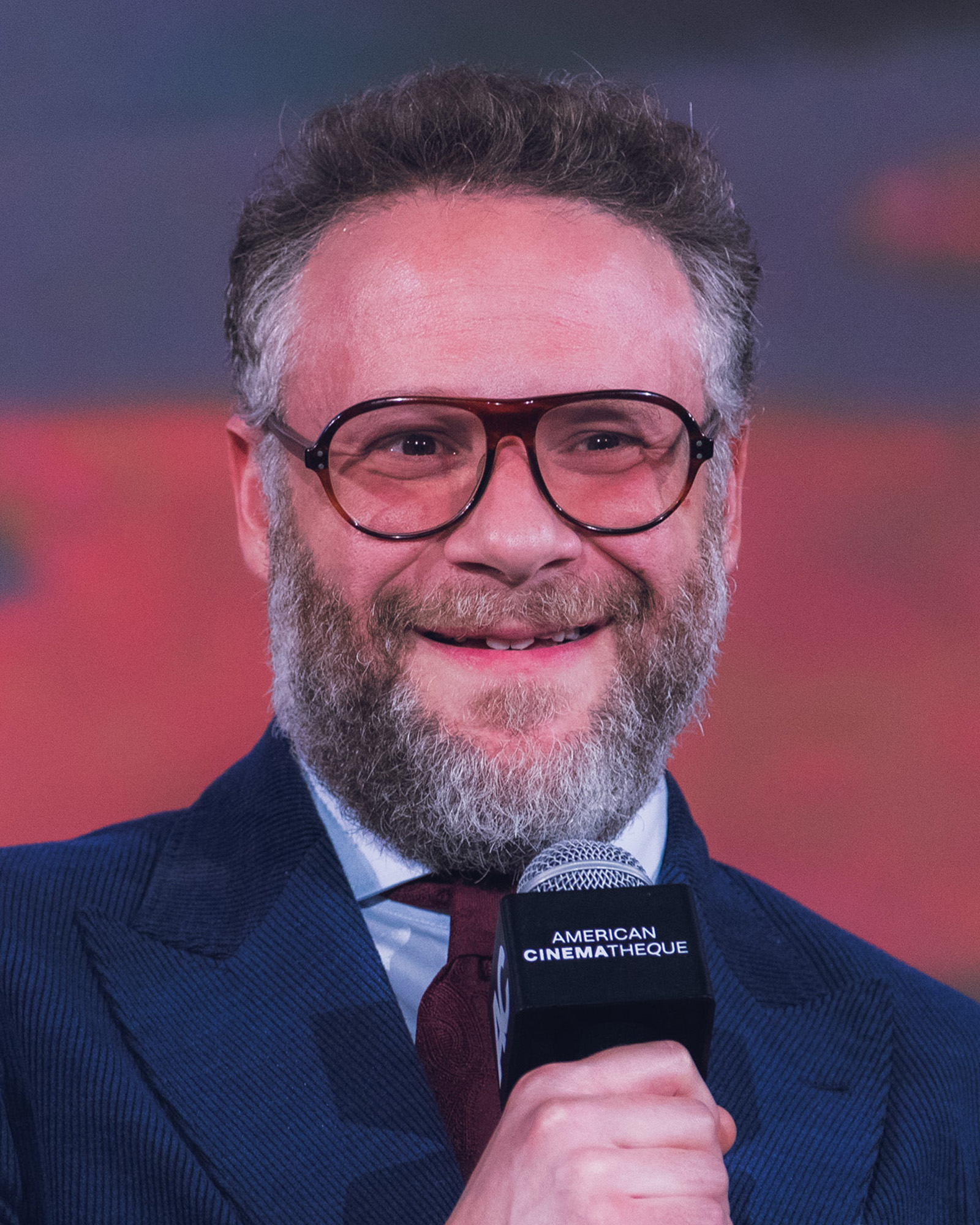
Seth Rogen, Best Actor in a Comedy or Musical Series winner

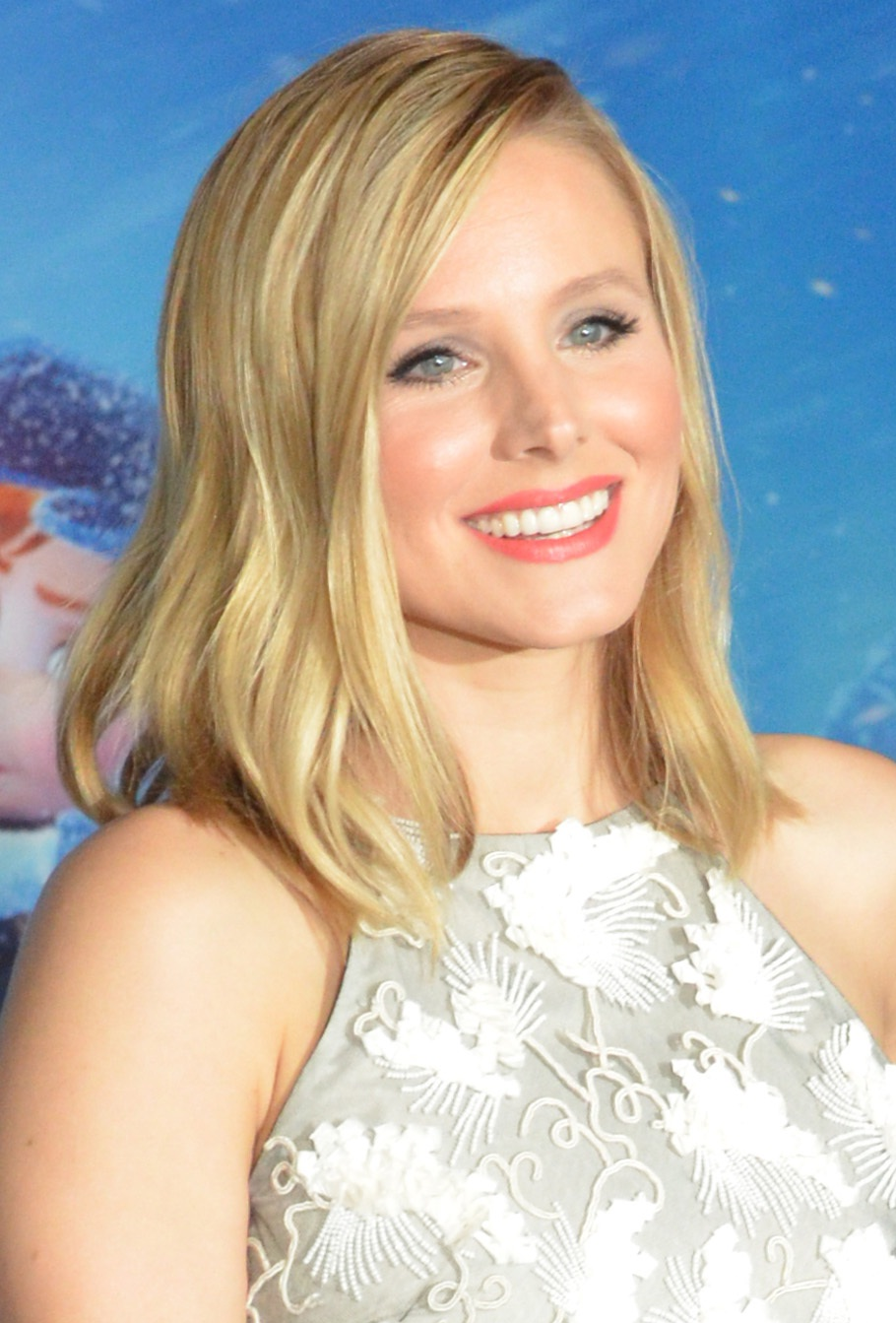
Kristen Bell, Best Actress in a Comedy or Musical Series winner

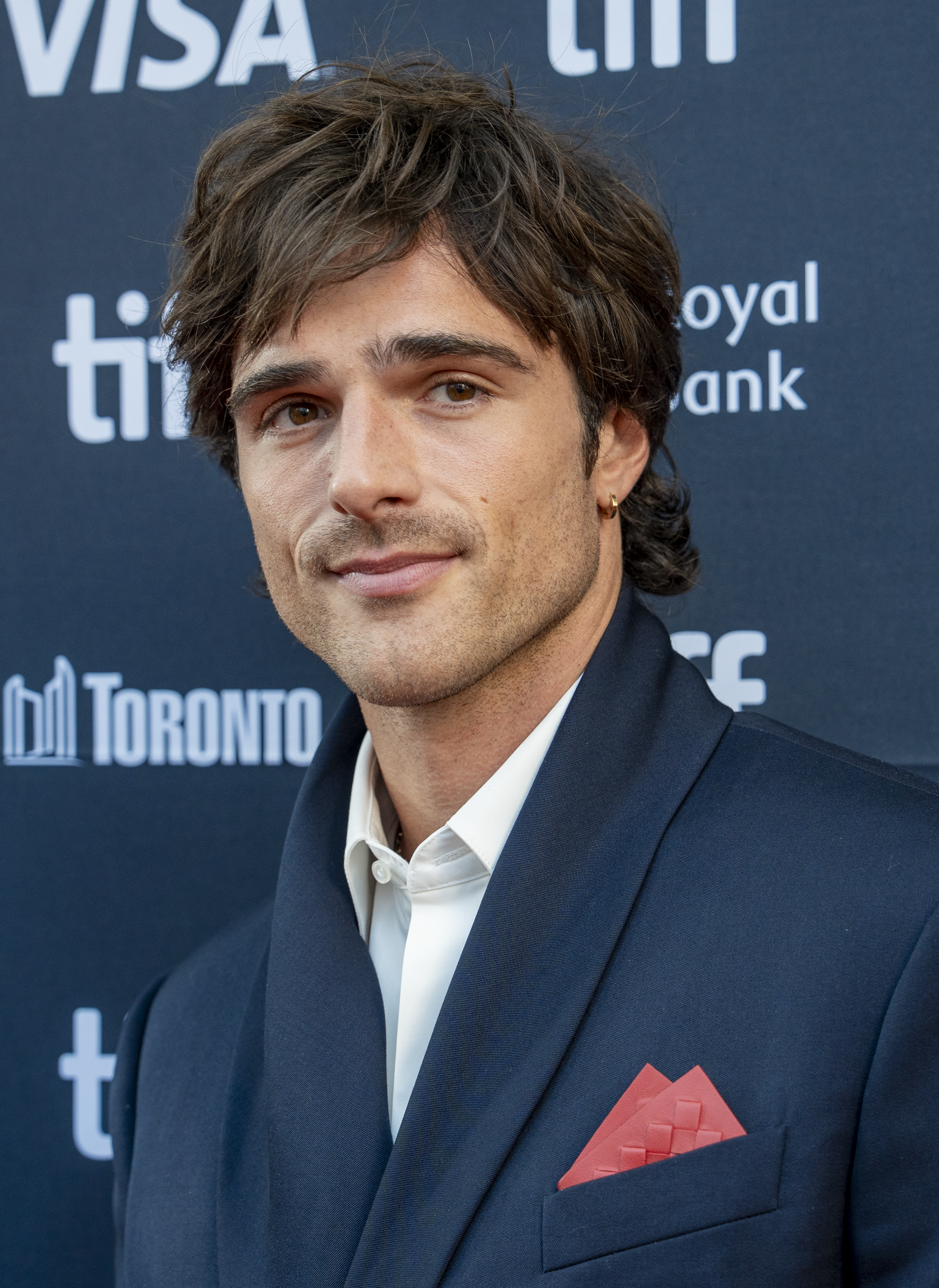
Jacob Elordi, Best Actor in a Miniseries, Limited Series, or Motion Picture Made for Television winner

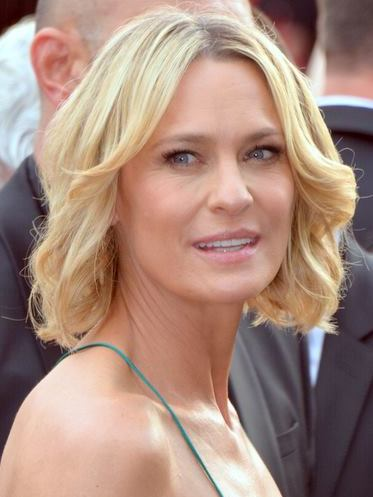
Robin Wright, Best Actress in a Miniseries, Limited Series, or Motion Picture Made for Television winner

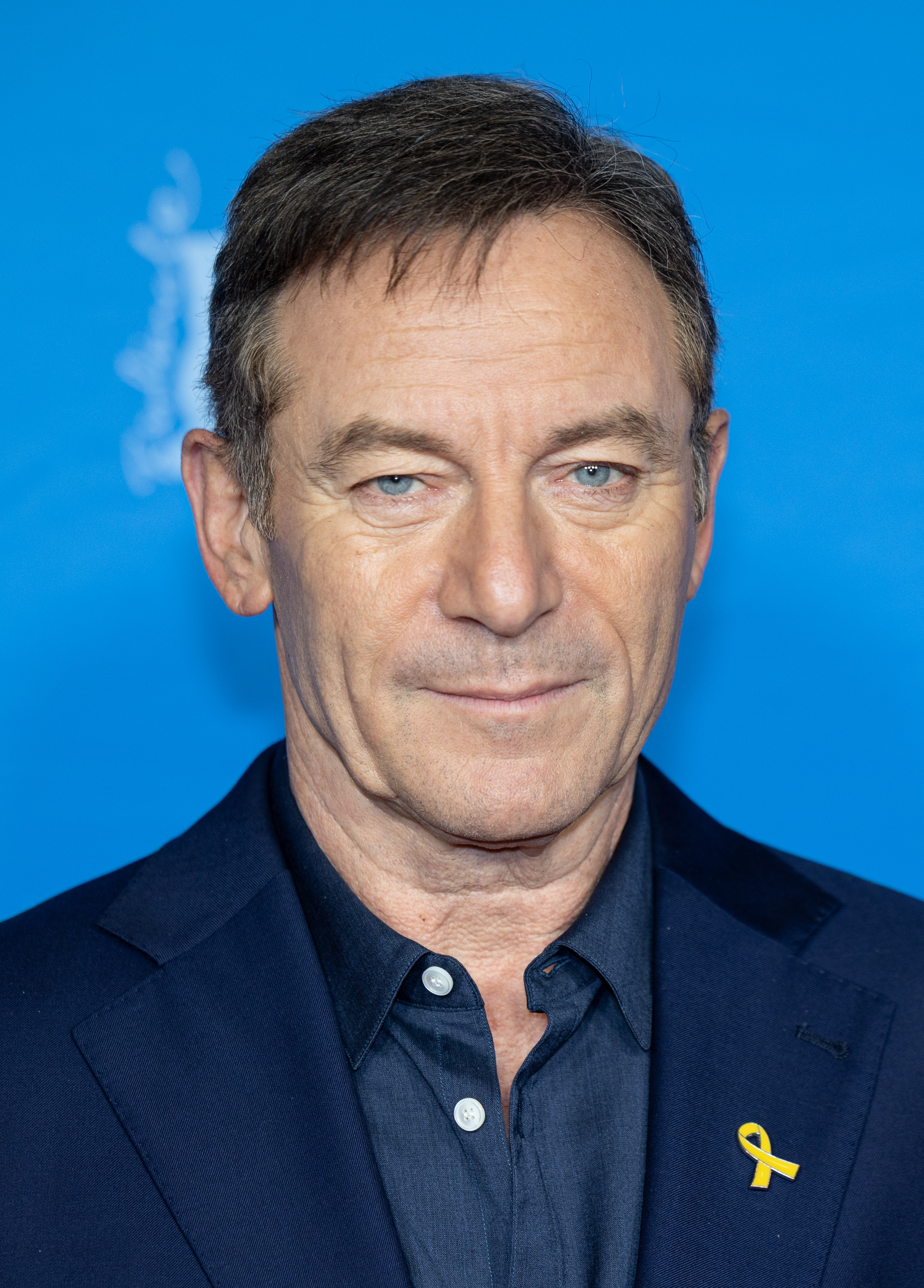
Jason Isaacs, Best Actor in a Supporting Role in a Series, Miniseries & Limited Series, or Motion Picture Made for Television winner

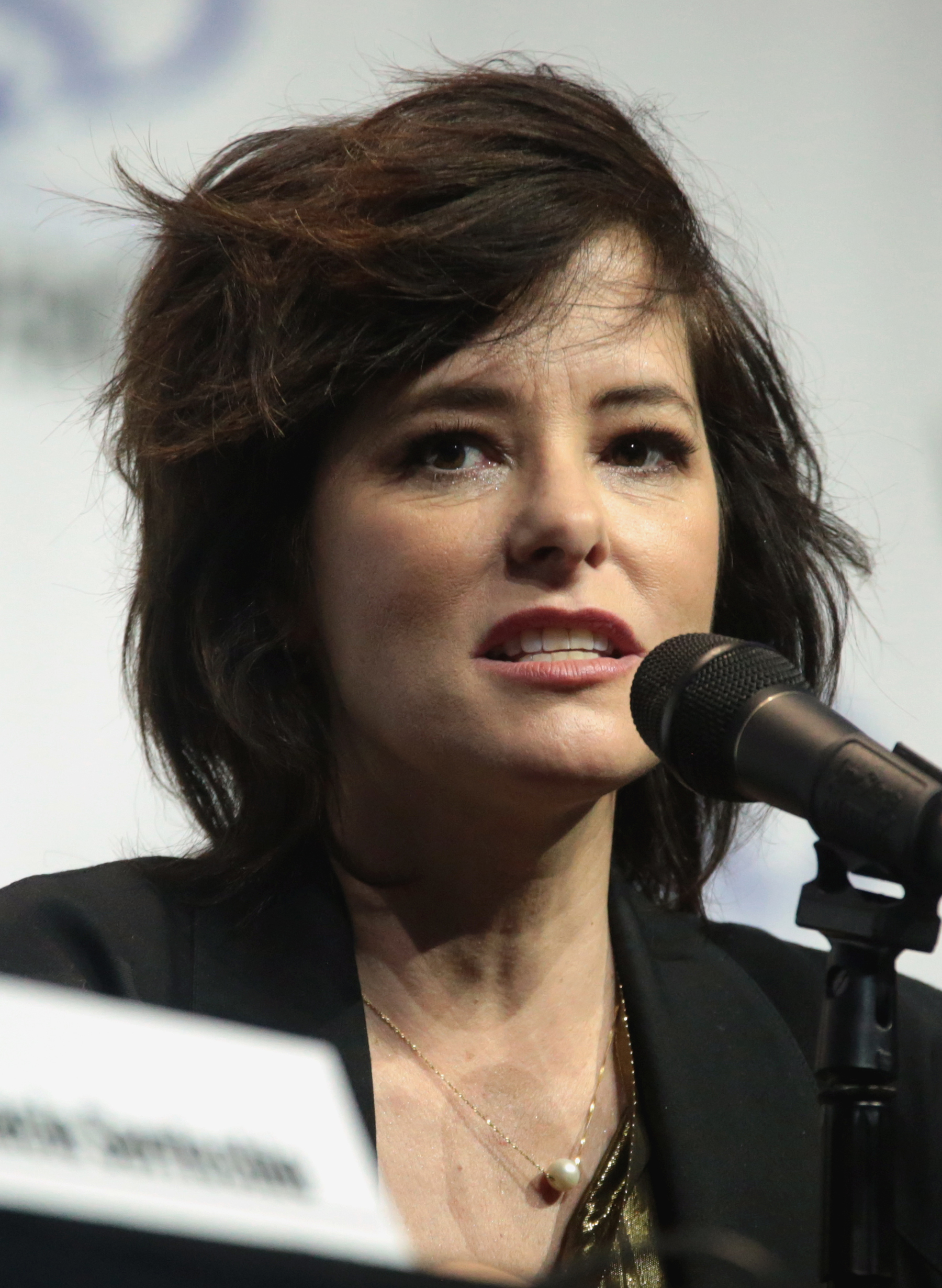
Parker Posey, Best Actress in a Supporting Role in a Series, Miniseries & Limited Series, or Motion Picture Made for Television winner

Winners are listed first and highlighted in bold.

Best Drama Series	Best Comedy or Musical Series
**Pluribus (Apple TV)**; The Diplomat (Netflix); Matlock (CBS); The Pitt (HBO Max); Severance (Apple TV); Slow Horses (Apple TV)	**Platonic (Apple TV)**; Abbott Elementary (ABC); The Bear (FX on Hulu); English Teacher (FX on Hulu); Hacks (HBO Max); Only Murders in the Building (Hulu)
Best Genre Series	Best Miniseries & Limited Series or Motion Picture Made for Television
**Andor (Disney+)**; The Last of Us (HBO Max); Stranger Things (Netflix); The White Lotus (HBO)	**Adolescence (Netflix)**; Cassandra (Netflix); Dying for Sex (FX on Hulu); Mr. Scorsese (Apple TV); The Narrow Road to the Deep North (Prime Video); Toxic Town (Netflix)
Best Actor in a Drama or Genre Series	Best Actress in a Drama or Genre Series
**Diego Luna – Andor as Cassian Andor (Disney+)**; Sterling K. Brown – Paradise as Xavier Collins (Hulu); Gary Oldman – Slow Horses as Jackson Lamb (Apple TV); Mark Ruffalo – Task as Tom Brandis (HBO Max); Adam Scott – Severance as Mark Scout / Mark S. (Apple TV); Noah Wyle – The Pitt as Dr. Michael "Robby" Robinavitch (HBO Max)	**Rhea Seehorn – Pluribus as Carol Sturka (Apple TV)**; Kathy Bates – Matlock as Madeline "Matty" Matlock / Madeline Kingston (CBS); Britt Lower – Severance as Helena Eagan / Helly R. (Apple TV); Helen Mirren – MobLand as Maeve Harrigan (Paramount+); Genevieve O'Reilly – Andor as Mon Mothma (Disney+); Keri Russell – The Diplomat as Kate Wyler (Netflix)
Best Actor in a Comedy or Musical Series	Best Actress in a Comedy or Musical Series
**Seth Rogen – The Studio as Matt Remick (Apple TV)**; Adam Brody – Nobody Wants This as Noah Roklov (Netflix); Steve Martin – Only Murders in the Building as Charles-Haden Savage (Hulu); Glen Powell – Chad Powers as Russ Holliday / Chad Powers (Hulu); Martin Short – Only Murders in the Building as Oliver Putnam (Hulu); Jeremy Allen White – The Bear as Carmen "Carmy" Berzatto (FX on Hulu)	**Kristen Bell – Nobody Wants This as Joanne Williams (Netflix)**; Quinta Brunson – Abbott Elementary as Janine Teagues (ABC); Ayo Edebiri – The Bear as Sydney Adamu (FX on Hulu); Selena Gomez – Only Murders in the Building as Mabel Mora (Hulu); Natasha Lyonne – Poker Face as Charlie Cale (Peacock); Jean Smart – Hacks as Deborah Vance (HBO Max)
Best Actor in a Miniseries, Limited Series, or Motion Picture Made for Television	Best Actress in a Miniseries, Limited Series, or Motion Picture Made for Television
**Jacob Elordi – The Narrow Road to the Deep North as Dorrigo Evans (Prime Video)**; Paul Giamatti – Black Mirror as Phillip Connarty (Netflix); Stephen Graham – Adolescence as Eddie Miller (Netflix); Charlie Hunnam – Monster: The Ed Gein Story as Ed Gein (Netflix); Jude Law – Black Rabbit as Jake Friedkin (Netflix); Matthew Rhys – The Beast in Me as Nile Jarvis (Netflix)	**Robin Wright – The Girlfriend as Laura Sanderson (Prime Video)**; Claire Danes – The Beast in Me as Agatha "Aggie" Wiggs (Netflix); Rashida Jones – Black Mirror as Amanda Waters (Netflix); Amanda Seyfried – Long Bright River as Mickey Fitzpatrick (Peacock); Sarah Snook – All Her Fault as Marissa Irvine (Peacock); Michelle Williams – Dying for Sex as Molly Kochan (FX on Hulu)
Best Actor in a Supporting Role in a Series, Miniseries & Limited Series, or Motion Picture Made for Television	Best Actress in a Supporting Role in a Series, Miniseries & Limited Series, or Motion Picture Made for Television
**Jason Isaacs – The White Lotus as Timothy Ratliff (HBO)**; Owen Cooper – Adolescence as Jamie Miller (Netflix); Billy Crudup – The Morning Show as Cory Ellison (Apple TV); Walton Goggins – The White Lotus as Rick Hatchett (HBO); Ebon Moss-Bachrach – The Bear as Richard "Richie" Jerimovich (FX on Hulu); Chris Perfetti – Abbott Elementary as Jacob Hill (ABC); Tramell Tillman – Severance as Seth Milchick / Mr. Milchick (Apple TV)	**Parker Posey – The White Lotus as Victoria Ratliff (HBO)**; Carrie Coon – The White Lotus as Laurie Duffy (HBO); Erin Doherty – Adolescence as Briony Ariston (Netflix); Hannah Einbinder – Hacks as Ava Daniels (HBO Max); Catherine O'Hara – The Studio as Patty Leigh (Apple TV); Saskia Reeves – Slow Horses as Catherine Standish (Apple TV)

=== Series with multiple nominations ===
Nominations	Series
5	The White Lotus
4	Adolescence
4	The Bear
4	Only Murders in the Building
4	Severance
3	Abbott Elementary
3	Andor
3	Hacks
3	Slow Horses
2	The Beast in Me
2	Black Mirror
2	The Diplomat
2	Dying for Sex
2	Matlock
2	The Narrow Road to the Deep North
2	Nobody Wants This
2	The Pitt
2	Pluribus
2	The Studio

=== Series with multiple wins ===
Wins	Series
2	Andor
2	Pluribus
2	The White Lotus
