= 4th Astra Creative Arts Awards =

Film and television awards

- Date: December 11, 2025
- Site: Castaway Burbank; Burbank, California
- Hosted by: Elyssa Phillips
- Official website: theastras.com

Highlights
- Most awards: Film: Frankenstein (3); Sinners (3); TV: The Pitt (3)
- Most nominations: Film: Sinners (9); TV: Stranger Things (11)

The 4th Astra Creative Arts Awards, presented by the Hollywood Creative Alliance, recognized technical achievements in film and television of 2025. The nominations were announced on November 19, 2025. The ceremony took place on December 11, 2025, at Castaway Burbank in Burbank, California. The event was hosted by actress and comedian Elyssa Phillips.

== Ceremony information ==
The period supernatural horror film Sinners led the nominations with nine, followed by the gothic science fiction film Frankenstein and musical fantasy film Wicked: For Good with eight each; in total, twenty-eight films were recognized across twelve creative arts categories. Sinners also received eleven nominations at the main film awards, bringing the film's nomination total to a record-breaking 20, tying with Wicked from the previous year. On the television side, Stranger Things received the most nominations with eleven, followed by Severance with eight and Wednesday with seven.

This year's nominees were selected by two nominating committees. The committees consisted of a wide range of industry professionals, including actors, artisans, critics, directors, entertainment journalists and publicists, all of whom are members of the Hollywood Creative Alliance.

Additionally, Best Original Score and Best Original Song were initially announced as part of the Creative Arts ceremony, but had been moved to the main ceremony taking place January 9, 2026.

== Winners and nominees ==
Winners are listed first and highlighted with boldface.

=== Film ===
**Best Casting**: **Francine Maisler – Sinners**; Bret Howe and Mary Vernieu – Wake Up Dead Man: A Knives Out Mystery; Cassandra Kulukundis – One Battle After Another; Douglas Aibel and Nina Gold – Jay Kelly; Jennifer Venditti – Marty Supreme; Yngvill Kolset Haga and Avy Kaufman – Sentimental Value	**Best Cinematography**: **Autumn Durald Arkapaw – Sinners**; Adolpho Veloso – Train Dreams; Dan Laustsen – Frankenstein; Darius Khondji – Marty Supreme; Łukasz Żal – Hamnet; Michael Bauman – One Battle After Another
**Best Costume Design**: **Kate Hawley – Frankenstein**; Lindsay Pugh – Hedda; Malgosia Turzanska – Hamnet; Malgorzata Karpiuk – The Testament of Ann Lee; Paul Tazewell – Wicked: For Good; Ruth E. Carter – Sinners	**Best Film Editing**: **Andy Jurgensen – One Battle After Another**; Josh Safdie and Ronald Bronstein – Marty Supreme; Kim Sang-bum and Kim Ho-bin – No Other Choice; Michael P. Shawver – Sinners; Myron Kerstein – Wicked: For Good; Olivier Bugge Coutté – Sentimental Value
**Best Makeup and Hairstyling**: **Mike Hill, Jordan Samuel, and Cliona Furey – Frankenstein**; Scott Barnes – Kiss of the Spider Woman; Siân Richards, Ken Diaz, Mike Fontaine, and Shunika Terry – Sinners; Erica Villanueva – Waltzing with Brando; Leo Satkovich, Melizah Wheat, and Jason Collins – Weapons; Frances Hannon, Mark Coulier, and Laura Blount – Wicked: For Good	**Best Marketing Campaign**: **Weapons**; Good Fortune; The Long Walk; Sinners; Superman; Wicked: For Good
**Best Production Design**: **Tamara Deverell – Frankenstein**; Adam Stockhausen and Anna Pinnock – The Phoenician Scheme; Cara Bower and Stella Fox – Hedda; Fiona Crombie and Alice Felton – Hamnet; Hannah Bleacher and Monique Champagne – Sinners; Nathan Crowley and Lee Sandales – Wicked: For Good	**Best Sound**: **Chris Welcker, Benjamin A. Burtt, Brandon Proctor, Steve Boeddeker, Felipe Pacheco, and David V. Butler – Sinners**; Nathan Robitaille, Nelson Ferreira, Christian Cooke, Brad Zoern, and Greg Chapman – Frankenstein; Michael Babcock, Tony Lamberti, Jeff Sawyer, Katie Halliday, Chris Diebold, and Trevor Gates – KPop Demon Hunters; José Antonio García, Christopher Scarabosio, and Tony Villaflor – One Battle After Another; Jeremy Peirson, Thomas Jones, Jeffrey Murias, Jeremy Peirson, and Carlos Sanches – The Long Walk; Nancy Nugent Title, John Marquis, Andy Nelson, Simon Hayes, and Jack Dolman – Wicked: For Good
**Best Visual Effects**: **Pablo Helman, Jonathan Fawkner, Anthony Smith, Dale Newton, and Paul Corbould – Wicked: For Good**; Ivan Moran – Black Phone 2; Dennis Berardi, Ayo Burgess, Ivan Busquets, and José Granell – Frankenstein; Christian Manz, Glen McIntosh, Andy Kind, and Terry Palmer – How to Train Your Dragon; David Vickery, Stephen Aplin, Charmaine Chan, Simone Coco, and Neil Corbould – Jurassic World Rebirth; Stéphane Ceretti, Enrico Damm, Stéphane Nazé, and Guy Williams – Superman	**Best Stunts**: **Mission: Impossible – The Final Reckoning**; The Accountant 2; Frankenstein; How to Train Your Dragon; One Battle After Another; Superman
**Best Stunt Coordinator**: **Wade Eastwood – Mission: Impossible – The Final Reckoning**; Andrei Nazarenko – Wicked: For Good; Andy Gill – Sinners; Eli Zagoudakis and Marshall Virtue – Frankenstein; Frank Blake – Dead Man's Wire; Thom Khoury Williams – Bugonia	**Best Second Unit Director**: **Adam Somner – One Battle After Another (posthumous)**; Fernando Chien – The Accountant 2; Hadie DeJesus – The Long Walk; Katie Swain – Wake Up Dead Man: A Knives Out Mystery; Townson Wells – Weapons; Wade Eastwood – Mission: Impossible – The Final Reckoning

=== Television ===
**Best Casting**: **The Pitt**; Adolescence; Dexter: Resurrection; The Paper; Severance; Stranger Things	**Best Choreography**: **Wednesday**; Gen V; The Last of Us; Robin Hood; Severance; Stranger Things
**Best Cinematography**: **Severance**; Landman; Outlander: Blood of My Blood; Pluribus; Stranger Things; Wednesday	**Best Costume Design**: **Wednesday**; The Gilded Age; It: Welcome to Derry; Outlander: Blood of My Blood; Robin Hood; Stranger Things
**Best Editing**: **The Pitt**; Black Rabbit; Landman; Pluribus; Severance; Stranger Things	**Best Hairstyling**: **Chad Powers**; Abbott Elementary; Devil in Disguise: John Wayne Gacy; The Gilded Age; Severance; Task
**Best Main Title Design**: **It: Welcome to Derry**; Devil in Disguise: John Wayne Gacy; Dexter: Resurrection; Outlander: Blood of My Blood; Pluribus; The Residence	**Best Makeup**: **Devil in Disguise: John Wayne Gacy**; Andor; Chad Powers; It: Welcome to Derry; Stranger Things; Wednesday
**Best Original Song**: **"Adam Sandler's Song" from Saturday Night Live 50th Anniversary Special**; "Best Time Ever" from Snoopy Presents: A Summer Musical; "Dream Come True" from Zombies 4: Dawn of the Vampires; "Funny How the Universe Works" from The Runarounds; "Oh Lord" from Peacemaker; "Senior Year" from The Runarounds	**Best Production Design**: **The Pitt**; Landman; Severance; Stranger Things; Wednesday
**Best Score**: **Stranger Things**; Nine Bodies in a Mexican Morgue; Severance; Squid Game; Task; Wednesday	**Best Sound**: **Alien: Earth**; Black Rabbit; Gen V; Landman; The Last of Us; Stranger Things
**Best Stunts**: **Gen V**; Reacher; Severance; Stranger Things; The Terminal List: Dark Wolf; Tulsa King	**Best Visual Effects**: **Stranger Things**; Alien: Earth; Andor; Bono: Stories of Surrender; Gen V; Wednesday

== Multiple wins ==
=== Film ===
The following films received multiple awards:

Wins	Film
3	Frankenstein
3	Sinners
2	Mission: Impossible – The Final Reckoning
2	One Battle After Another

=== Television ===
The following television series received multiple awards:

Wins	Series
3	The Pitt
2	Stranger Things
2	Wednesday

== Multiple nominations ==
=== Film ===
The following films received multiple nominations:

Nominations	Film
9	Sinners
8	Frankenstein
8	Wicked: For Good
6	One Battle After Another
3	Hamnet
3	The Long Walk
3	Marty Supreme
3	Mission: Impossible – The Final Reckoning
3	Superman
3	Weapons
2	The Accountant 2
2	Hedda
2	How to Train Your Dragon
2	Sentimental Value
2	Wake Up Dead Man: A Knives Out Mystery

=== Television ===
The following television series received multiple nominations:

Nominations	Series
11	Stranger Things
8	Severance
7	Wednesday
4	Gen V
4	Landman
4	Pluribus
3	Devil in Disguise: John Wayne Gacy
3	It: Welcome to Derry
3	Outlander: Blood of My Blood
3	The Pitt
2	Alien: Earth
2	Andor
2	Black Rabbit
2	Chad Powers
2	Dexter: Resurrection
2	The Gilded Age
2	The Last of Us
2	Robin Hood
2	The Runarounds
2	Task

== See also ==
- 5th Astra TV Awards
- 9th Astra Film Awards
- 8th Astra Midseason Movie Awards
