= Critics' Choice Movie Award for Best Sound =

Award given by the Critics Choice Association

The Critics' Choice Movie Award for Best Sound is an award given to people working in the motion picture industry by the Critics Choice Association, previously retired from 2009 to 2011. In 2025, the category was re-introduced for the 31st Critics' Choice Awards.

== Winners and nominees ==
=== 2000s ===
2009: Avatar

- District 9
- The Hurt Locker
- Nine
- Star Trek

=== 2010s ===
2010: Inception

- 127 Hours
- Black Swan
- The Social Network
- Toy Story 3

2011: Harry Potter and the Deathly Hallows – Part 2

- Hugo
- Super 8
- The Tree of Life
- War Horse

=== 2020s ===
2025: F1 – Al Nelson, Gwendolyn Yates Whittle, Gary A. Rizzo, Juan Peralta, and Gareth John

- Frankenstein – Nathan Robitaille, Nelson Ferreira, Christian Cooke, Brad Zoern, and Greg Chapman
- One Battle After Another – José Antonio García, Christopher Scarabosio, and Tony Villaflor
- Sinners – Chris Welcker, Benny Burtt, Brandon Proctor, Steve Boeddeker, Felipe Pacheco, and David V. Butler
- Sirāt – Laia Casanovas
- Warfare – Mitch Low, Glenn Freemantle, Ben Barker, Howard Bargroff, and Richard Spooner

== See also ==
- Academy Award for Best Sound
