= 2025 St. Louis Film Critics Association Awards =

Awards ceremony

22nd StLFCA Awards

December 14, 2025

Best Film:
One Battle After Another

The nominees for the 22nd St. Louis Film Critics Association Awards were announced on December 7, 2025. The winners were announced on December 14, 2025.

Paul Thomas Anderson's One Battle After Another led the nominations with fifteen, followed by Sinners with fourteen and Hamnet with eleven. One Battle After Another was also the most awarded film with nine wins, including Best Film, Best Director (Anderson), Best Actor (Leonardo DiCaprio) and Best Supporting Actor (Sean Penn).

== Winners and nominees ==
=== Best Film ===
- One Battle After Another
  - Runner-up: Sinners
    - Frankenstein
    - Hamnet
    - It Was Just an Accident
    - Marty Supreme
    - The Phoenician Scheme
    - The Secret Agent
    - Superman
    - Weapons

=== Best Actor ===
- Leonardo DiCaprio – One Battle After Another as Bob Ferguson
  - Runner-up: Timothée Chalamet – Marty Supreme as Marty Mauser
    - Ethan Hawke – Blue Moon as Lorenz Hart
    - Michael B. Jordan – Sinners as Elijah "Smoke" Moore / Elias "Stack" Moore
    - Wagner Moura – The Secret Agent as Marcelo Alves / Armando Solimões / Fernando Solimões

=== Best Supporting Actor ===
- Sean Penn – One Battle After Another as Col. Steven J. Lockjaw
  - Runner-up: Benicio del Toro – One Battle After Another as Sensei Sergio St. Carlos
    - Paul Mescal – Hamnet as William Shakespeare
    - Andrew Scott – Blue Moon as Richard Rodgers
    - Stellan Skarsgård – Sentimental Value as Gustav Borg

=== Best Original Screenplay ===
- Weapons – Zach Cregger
  - Runner-up: It Was Just an Accident – Jafar Panahi
    - Blue Moon – Robert Kaplow
    - Marty Supreme – Ronald Bronstein and Josh Safdie
    - Sinners – Ryan Coogler
    - Sorry, Baby – Eva Victor

=== Best Animated Feature ===
- Zootopia 2
  - Runner-up: KPop Demon Hunters
    - Arco
    - Elio
    - Ne Zha 2

=== Best International Feature Film ===
- It Was Just an Accident • Iran
  - Runner-up: Sentimental Value • Norway
    - No Other Choice • South Korea
    - The Secret Agent • Brazil
    - Sirāt • Spain

=== Best Cinematography ===
- One Battle After Another – Michael Bauman
  - Runner-up: Train Dreams – Adolpho Veloso
    - Frankenstein – Dan Laustsen
    - Hamnet – Łukasz Żal
    - Sinners – Autumn Durald Arkapaw

=== Best Costume Design ===
- Frankenstein – Kate Hawley
  - Runner-up: Sinners – Ruth E. Carter
    - Hamnet – Malgosia Turzanska
    - The Testament of Ann Lee – Małgorzata Karpiuk
    - Wicked: For Good – Paul Tazewell

=== Best Music Score ===
- One Battle After Another – Jonny Greenwood
  - Runner-up: The Testament of Ann Lee – Daniel Blumberg
    - Frankenstein – Alexandre Desplat
    - Hamnet – Max Richter
    - Sinners – Ludwig Göransson

=== Best Visual Effects ===
- Avatar: Fire and Ash – Joe Letteri, Richard Baneham, Eric Saindon, and Daniel Barrett
  - Runner-up: Superman – Stéphane Ceretti, Enrico Damm, Stéphane Nazé, and Guy Williams
    - F1 – Ryan Tudhope, Nikeah Forde, Robert Harrington, Nicolas Chevallier, Eric Leven, Edward Price, and Keith Dawson
    - Sinners – Michael Ralla, Espen Nordahl, Guido Wolter, and Donnie Dean
    - Tron: Ares – David Seager, Walter Garcia, Jeff Capogreco, Abishek Nair, Vincent Papaix, and Ross Duncan McCabe

=== Best Comedy Film ===
- The Naked Gun
  - Runner-up: Friendship
    - Eephus
    - Good Fortune
    - The Phoenician Scheme

=== Best Scene ===
- Sinners – Music evolution set to "I Lied to You"
  - Runner-up: One Battle After Another – Climactic rolling hills car chase scene
    - Hamnet – The Globe theatrical production
    - It Was Just an Accident – Finale
    - Weapons – The fate of Aunt Gladys

=== Best First Feature ===
- Eva Victor – Sorry, Baby
  - Runner-up: Emilie Blichfeldt – The Ugly Stepsister
    - Andrew DeYoung – Friendship
    - Drew Hancock – Companion
    - Carson Lund – Eephus

=== Best Director ===
- Paul Thomas Anderson – One Battle After Another
  - Runner-up: Ryan Coogler – Sinners
    - Jafar Panahi – It Was Just an Accident
    - Josh Safdie – Marty Supreme
    - Chloé Zhao – Hamnet

=== Best Actress ===
- Jessie Buckley – Hamnet as Agnes Shakespeare
  - Runner-up: Rose Byrne – If I Had Legs I'd Kick You as Linda
    - Chase Infiniti – One Battle After Another as Willa Ferguson
    - Amanda Seyfried – The Testament of Ann Lee as Ann Lee
    - Emma Stone – Bugonia as Michelle Fuller

=== Best Supporting Actress ===
- Amy Madigan – Weapons as Gladys
  - Runner-up: Teyana Taylor – One Battle After Another as Perfidia Beverly Hills
    - Glenn Close – Wake Up Dead Man as Martha Delacroix
    - Elle Fanning – Sentimental Value as Rachel Kemp
    - Inga Ibsdotter Lilleaas – Sentimental Value as Agnes Borg Pettersen

=== Best Adapted Screenplay ===
- One Battle After Another – Paul Thomas Anderson; inspired by the novel Vineland by Thomas Pynchon
  - Runner-up: Wake Up Dead Man – Rian Johnson; based on the characters by Johnson
    - Frankenstein – Guillermo del Toro; based on the novel by Mary Shelley
    - Hamnet – Chloé Zhao and Maggie O'Farrell; based on the novel by O'Farrell
    - Train Dreams – Clint Bentley and Greg Kwedar; based on the novella by Denis Johnson

=== Best Documentary Feature ===
- Orwell: 2+2=5
  - Runner-up: The Perfect Neighbor
    - 2000 Meters to Andriivka
    - Afternoons of Solitude
    - Deaf President Now!

=== Best Ensemble ===
- One Battle After Another
  - Runner-up: Black Bag
    - Hamnet
    - A House of Dynamite
    - Sinners

=== Best Editing ===
- One Battle After Another – Andy Jurgensen
  - Runner-up: A House of Dynamite – Kirk Baxter
    - F1 – Stephen Mirrione
    - Marty Supreme – Ronald Bronstein and Josh Safdie
    - Sinners – Michael P. Shawver

=== Best Production Design ===
- Frankenstein – Tamara Deverell and Shane Vieau
  - Runner-up: The Phoenician Scheme – Adam Stockhausen and Anna Pinnock
    - Hamnet – Fiona Crombie and Alice Felton
    - Sinners – Hannah Beachler and Monique Champagne
    - Wicked: For Good – Nathan Crowley and Lee Sandales

=== Best Music Soundtrack ===
- Sinners
  - Runner-up: KPop Demon Hunters
    - Marty Supreme
    - Springsteen: Deliver Me from Nowhere
    - Wicked: For Good

=== Best Action Film ===
- Mission: Impossible – The Final Reckoning
  - Runner-up: Superman
  - F1
  - One Battle After Another
  - Warfare

=== Best Horror Film ===
- Weapons
  - Runner-up: Sinners
    - 28 Years Later
    - Companion
    - Frankenstein

=== Best Stunts ===
- Mission: Impossible – The Final Reckoning – Wade Eastwood
  - Runner-up: Ballerina – Stephen Dunlevy, Kyle Gardiner, Jackson Spidell, Jeremy Marinas, Jan Petřina, Domonkos Párdányi, and Kinga Kósa-Gavalda
    - F1 – Gary Powell, Luciano Bacheta, and Craig Dolby
    - One Battle After Another – Brian Machleit
    - Warfare – Giedrius Nagys

=== Best Vocal Performance ===
- Will Patton – Train Dreams as the narrator
  - Runner-up: Arden Cho – KPop Demon Hunters as Rumi
    - Ginnifer Goodwin – Zootopia 2 as Judy Hopps
    - Damian Lewis – Orwell: 2+2=5 as the narrator
    - Scarlett Sher – Weapons as the child narrator
