= Dick Bernstein =

American sound editor

- Occupation: Sound editor

Dick Bernstein is an American sound editor. He was nominated for an Academy Award in the category Best Sound for the film Avatar: The Way of Water.

== Selected filmography ==
- Avatar: The Way of Water (2022; co-nominated with Julian Howarth, Gwendolyn Yates Whittle, Christopher Boyes, Gary Summers and Michael Hedges)
