= Al Nelson (sound engineer) =

American sound engineer

- Occupation: Sound engineer

Al Nelson is an American sound engineer. He won two Academy Awards in the category Best Sound for the films Top Gun: Maverick and F1.

== Selected filmography ==
- Toy Story 2 (1999)
- WALL-E (2008)
- How to Train Your Dragon (2010)
- 20 Feet from Stardom (2013)
- Jurassic World (2015)
- Knives Out (2019)
- Top Gun: Maverick (2022)
- F1 (2025)

== Accolades ==
=== Academy Awards ===
Year (Note: Year of Ceremony)	Category	Nominated work	Result	Ref.
2022	Best Sound	Top Gun: Maverick	Won (Note: Shared with Mark Weingarten, James Mather, Chris Burdon and Mark Taylor)	
2025	Best Sound	F1	Won (Note: Shared with Gwendolyn Yates Whittle, Gary Rizzo, Juan Peralta and Gareth John)	

=== BAFTA Awards ===
Year	Category	Nominated work	Result	Ref.
2022	Best Sound	Top Gun: Maverick	Nominated	
2025	Best Sound	F1	Won	

=== Critics' Choice Awards ===
Year	Category	Nominated work	Result	Ref.
2025	Best Sound	F1	Won	

=== Satellite Awards ===
Year	Category	Nominated work	Result	Ref.
2015	Best Sound	Jurassic World	Nominated	
2022	Best Sound	Top Gun: Maverick	Won	
2024	Best Sound	Twisters	Nominated	
2025	Best Sound	F1	Won	
