= Julian Howarth =

British sound mixer and recordist

- Born: Wakefield, West Yorkshire, England
- Occupations: Actor, Sound mixer
- Years active: 1996–present
- Spouse: Julie Gardner
- Children: Huckleberry Gardner-Howarth

Julian Howarth is a British sound mixer and recordist. He was nominated for an Academy Award in the category Best Sound for the film Avatar: The Way of Water. His nomination was shared with Gwendolyn Yates Whittle, Dick Bernstein, Christopher Boyes, Gary Summers and Michael Hedges.

== Career ==
Julian holds degrees of BSc (Hons) Physics from Liverpool University. Before transitioning to film and television, he began his career in music and theater.

He worked as a sound engineer for Avatar: The Way of Water, and ensured atmospheric forest or underwater sounds on the set. For the film, he was nominated for an Oscar in the Best Sound category in 2023.

== Selected filmography ==
Sound mixer

- 2022 – Avatar: The Way of Water
- 2022 – Obi-Wan Kenobi
- 2022 – Morbius
- 2021 – Encounter
- 2021 – Malignant
- 2021 – Wrath of Man
- 2019 – Ad Astra
- 2019 – The Curse of La Llorona
- 2019 – Alita: Battle Angel
- 2017 – Bright

== Awards and nominations ==
Year	Result	Award	Category	Work	Ref.
2023	Nominated	Academy Awards	Best Sound	Avatar: The Way of Water	
2023	Nominated	BAFTA Film Awards	Best Sound	Avatar: The Way of Water	
2023	Nominated	Hollywood Critics Association Creative Arts Awards	Best Sound	Avatar: The Way of Water	
2023	Nominated	Satellite Awards	Best Sound	Avatar: The Way of Water	
2023	Nominated	Cinema Audio Society Awards	Outstanding Achievement in Sound Mixing for a Motion Picture – Live Action	Avatar: The Way of Water	
2023	Won	Cinema Audio Society Awards	Outstanding Achievement in Sound Mixing for Non-Theatrical Motion Picture or Limited Series	Obi-Wan Kenobi	
2021	Nominated	British Independent Film Awards	Best Sound	Encounter	
2014	Nominated	Australian Screen Sound Guild	Best Achievement in Sound for a Documentary	Deepsea Challenge 3D	
2010	Nominated	BAFTA Cymru	Best Sound (Y Sain Gorau)	Torchwood	
2009	Won	BAFTA Cymru	Best Sound (Y Sain Gorau)	Doctor Who	
2008	Won	Royal Television Society	Best Sound: Drama	Doctor Who	
2007	Won	BAFTA Cymru	Best Sound (Y Sain Gorau)	Doctor Who	
2007	Nominated	British Academy Television Craft Awards	Best Sound (Y Sain Gorau)	Doctor Who	
