= Miyako Bellizzi =

American costume designer

- Born: San Francisco, California, U.S.
- Occupation: Costume designer
- Years active: 2016–present

Miyako Bellizzi is an American costume designer. She was nominated for an Academy Award in the category Best Costume Design for the film Marty Supreme.

Bellizzi was born in San Francisco, California, to parents of Japanese and Italian descent. She was raised in Alameda. She lives in Bedford-Stuyvesant section of Brooklyn.

== Selected filmography ==
- Good Time (2017)
- Uncut Gems (2019)
- Next Goal Wins (2023)
- Marty Supreme (2025)
