= Juan Peralta (sound engineer) =

American sound engineer

- Education: Full Sail University
- Occupation: Sound engineer

Juan Peralta is an American sound engineer. He won an Academy Award in the category Best Sound for the film F1.

== Selected filmography ==
- F1 (2025; co-won with Gareth John, Al Nelson, Gwendolyn Yates Whittle and Gary Rizzo)
