= Eric Saindon =

American visual effects supervisor

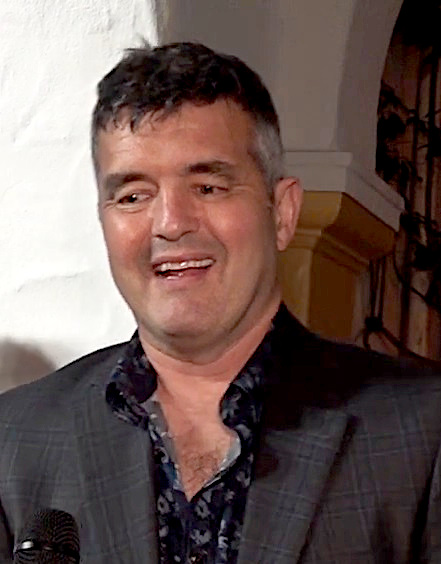
- Saindon in 2023
- Born: 5 December 1970 (age 55); USA
- Occupation: Visual effects supervisor
- Years active: 1993–present

Eric Saindon (born December 5, 1970) is an American visual effects supervisor for movies, including Avatar: Fire and Ash, Avatar: The Way of Water, The Green Knight, Pete's Dragon, The Hobbit trilogy (2012–2014), Avatar, Alita: Battle Angel, Night at the Museum, X-Men: The Last Stand and worked on others such as, King Kong, I, Robot, The Lord of the Rings: The Return of the King, The Lord of the Rings: The Two Towers, The Lord of the Rings: The Fellowship of the Ring. He has won 2 Oscars and 2 BAFTAs himself. He lives in Wellington, New Zealand.

== Awards ==
=== Academy Award and BAFTA nominations ===
- Avatar: Fire and Ash (won)
- Avatar: The Way of Water (won)
- The Hobbit: The Battle of the Five Armies
- The Hobbit: The Desolation of Smaug
- The Hobbit: An Unexpected Journey

=== Visual Effects Society Awards ===
- Avatar: The Way of Water
- Avatar
- King Kong
- The Lord of the Rings: The Return of the King
- The Lord of the Rings: The Two Towers
