= Robert Harrington (visual effects artist) =

British visual effects artist

- Occupation: Visual effects artist

Robert Harrington is a British visual effects artist. He was nominated for an Academy Award in the category Best Visual Effects for the film F1.

== Selected filmography ==
- F1 (2025; co-nominated with Ryan Tudhope, Nicolas Chevallier and Keith Dawson)
