= Mike Fontaine =

American make-up artist

- Occupation: Make-up artist

Mike Fontaine is an American make-up artist. He was nominated for two Academy Awards in the category Best Makeup and Hairstyling for the films The Batman and Sinners.

== Selected filmography ==
- Deliver Us from Evil (2014)
- Green Room (2015)
- American Ultra (2015)
- Gringo (2018)
- The Spy Gone North (2018)
- The Goldfinch (2019)
- Coming 2 America (2021)
- The Batman (2022; co-nominated with Naomi Donne and Mike Marino)
- Maestro (2023)
- Sinners (2025; co-nominated with Ken Diaz and Shunika Terry)
- Marty Supreme (2025)
