= Ryan Tudhope =

American visual effects artist

- Occupation: Visual effects artist

Ryan Tudhope is an American visual effects artist. He was nominated for two Academy Awards in the category Best Visual Effects for the films Top Gun: Maverick and F1.

In addition to his Academy Awards nominations, he was nominated for a Primetime Emmy Award in the category Outstanding Special Visual Effects for his work on the television program Cosmos: A Spacetime Odyssey. His nomination was shared with Rainer Gombos, Addie Manis, Natasha Francis, Luke McDonald, Sam Edwards, Michael Mahler, Dominic Vidal and Ergin Kuke.

== Selected filmography ==
- Top Gun: Maverick (2022; co-nominated with Seth Hill, Bryan Litson and Scott R. Fisher)
- F1 (2025; co-nominated with Nicolas Chevallier, Robert Harrington and Keith Dawson)
