= Keith Dawson =

British special effects artist

- Occupation: Special effects artist

Keith Dawson is a British special effects artist. He was nominated for an Academy Award in the category Best Visual Effects for the film F1.

== Selected filmography ==
- F1 (2025; co-nominated with Ryan Tudhope, Nicolas Chevallier and Robert Harrington)
