= Tony Villaflor =

American sound engineer

- Occupation: Sound engineer

Tony Villaflor is an American sound engineer. He was nominated for an Academy Award in the category Best Sound for the film One Battle After Another.

In addition to his Academy Award nomination, he was nominated for two Primetime Emmy Awards in the category Outstanding Sound Mixing for his work on the television programs Laurel Canyon and The Mandalorian.

== Selected filmography ==
- One Battle After Another (2025; co-nominated with José Antonio García and Christopher Scarabosio)
