= Nicolas Chevallier =

French-born New Zealand-Canadian visual effects artist

- Born: France
- Education: IUT Rouen
- Occupation: Visual effects artist

Nicolas Chevallier is a French-Canadian visual effects artist. He was nominated for an Academy Award in the category Best Visual Effects for the film F1.

== Selected filmography ==
- F1 (2025; co-nominated with Ryan Tudhope, Robert Harrington and Keith Dawson)
