= Gwendolyn Yates Whittle =

Sound editor

- Born: 1961 (age 64–65)
- Other names: Gwendolyn Y. Whittle; Gwendolyn Whittle; Gwen Whittle
- Occupation: Sound editor
- Years active: 1985–present

Gwendolyn Yates Whittle (born 1961) is an Academy Award winning sound editor. She has worked on over 120 films to date. She has won 5 Golden Reel Awards at the Motion Picture Sound Editors. She is a member of Skywalker Sound.

== Oscar nominations ==
Two nominations are in the category of Best Sound Editing and one is in the category of Best Sound.

- 82nd Academy Awards-Nominated for Avatar. Nomination shared with Christopher Boyes. Lost to The Hurt Locker.
- 83rd Academy Awards-Nominated for Tron: Legacy. Nomination shared with Addison Teague. Lost to Inception.
- 95th Academy Awards-Nominated for Avatar: The Way of Water. Nomination shared with Julian Howarth, Dick Bernstein, Christopher Boyes, Gary Summers, and Michael Hedges. Lost to Top Gun: Maverick.
- 98th Academy Awards- Win for F1. shared with Gareth John, Al Nelson, Gary Rizzo and Juan Peralta
