= Shunika Terry =

American hairstylist

- Occupation: Hairstylist

Shunika Terry is an American hairstylist. She was nominated for an Academy Award in the category Best Makeup and Hairstyling for the film Sinners.

In addition to her Academy Award nomination, she was nominated for a Primetime Emmy Award in the category Outstanding Hairstyling for her work on the television program Mare of Easttown. Her nomination was shared with Lawrence Davis, Lydia Benaim and Ivana Primorac.

== Selected filmography ==
- Sinners (2025; co-nominated with Ken Diaz and Mike Fontaine)
