= Monique Champagne =

American set decorator

- Born: Monique Mejia Champagne
- Occupation: Set decorator

Monique Mejia Champagne is an American set decorator. She was nominated for an Academy Award in the category Best Production Design for the film Sinners.

== Selected filmography ==
- Sinners (2025; co-pending nominated with Hannah Beachler)
