= Tamara Deverell =

Canadian art director and production designer

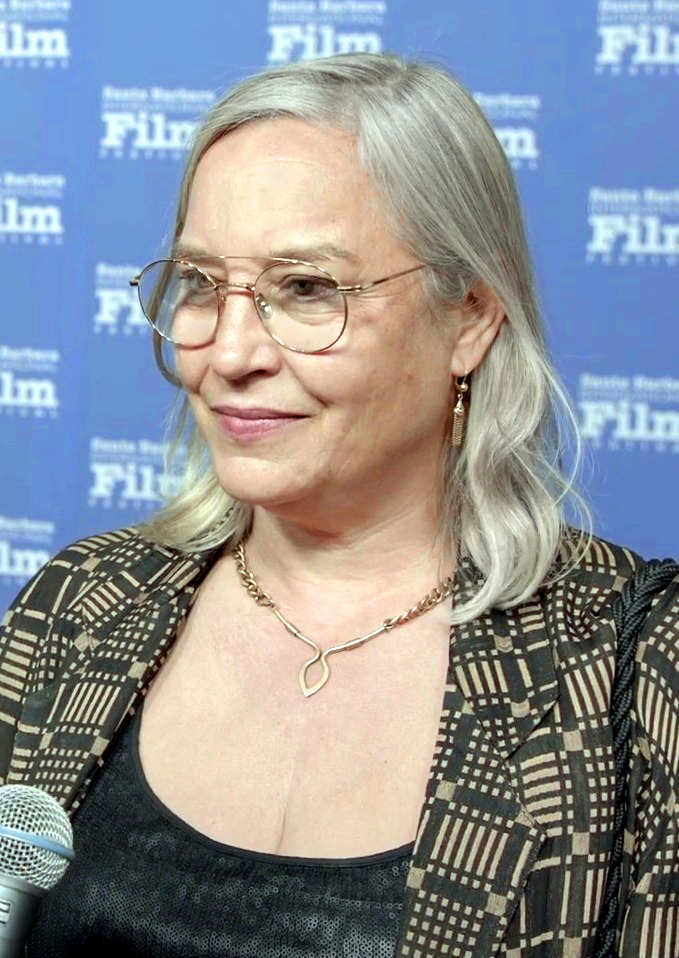
- Deverell in 2022
- Occupations: Art director, production designer

Tamara Deverell is a Canadian art director and production designer. She won an Academy Award and was nominated for another one in the category Best Production Design for the films Nightmare Alley and Frankenstein.

== Selected filmography ==
- Still Mine (2012, producer)
- Nightmare Alley (2021; co-nominated with Shane Vieau)
- Priscilla (2023)
- Frankenstein (2025; co-won with Shane Vieau)
