= Malgosia Turzanska =

Polish-American costume designer

- Born: Małgorzata Turżańska; 1980 (age 45–46); Kraków, Poland
- Education: Academy of Performing Arts in Prague (BA); New York University Tisch School of the Arts (MA)
- Known for: Costume design
- Notable work: Hamnet
- Spouse: Joe Anderson
- Website: turzanska.com

Malgosia Turzanska (born Małgorzata Turżańska; 1980, Kraków) is a Polish-American costume designer.

== Life ==
A graduate of the Theatre Faculty of the Academy of Performing Arts in Prague (Bachelor of Arts) and New York University Tisch School of the Arts (Master of Arts).

She began her career as an assistant to Agnieszka Holland during the filming of Janosik: A True Story. She later worked as a costume designer on productions such as Stranger Things, The Green Knight, Train Dreams, Hell or High Water and X. She also collaborated on music videos for MGMT and the Yeah Yeah Yeahs.

At the 98th Academy Awards, she was nominated for the Academy Award for Best Costume Design for the 2025 film Hamnet.

== Personal life ==
She grew up in Kraków, Poland. As a teenager, she moved to the United Arab Emirates. In 2005, she settled in New York City. In 2017, she obtained American citizenship. Her second husband became cinematographer Joe Anderson. Besides her native Polish, she speaks English and Czech.
