= Felipe Pacheco =

Costa Rican-born American sound editor

- Born: Costa Rica
- Education: Berklee College of Music
- Occupation: Sound editor

Felipe Pacheco is a Costa Rican-born American sound editor. He was nominated for an Academy Award in the category Best Sound for the film Sinners.

In addition to his Academy Award nomination, he was nominated for a Primetime Emmy Award in the category Outstanding Sound Editing for his work on the television program Severance. His nomination was shared with Jacob Ribicoff, Gregg Swiatlowski, Eric Strausser, Sam Zeines, Marko Costanzo and Alex Wang.

== Selected filmography ==
- Sinners (2025; co-nominated with Chris Welcker, Benjamin A. Burtt, Brandon Proctor and Steve Boeddeker)
