= Chris Welcker =

American sound engineer

- Born: New Orleans, Louisiana, U.S.
- Education: University of Louisiana at Lafayette
- Occupation: Sound engineer

Chris Welcker is an American sound engineer. He was nominated for an Academy Award in the category Best Sound for the film Sinners.

In addition to his Academy Award nomination, he won a Primetime Emmy Award in the category Outstanding Sound Mixing for his work on the television program Daisy Jones & the Six. His win was shared with Lindsey Alvarez, Mathew Waters and Mike Poole.

== Selected filmography ==
- Sinners (2025; co-nominated with Benjamin A. Burtt, Felipe Pacheco, Brandon Proctor and Steve Boeddeker)
