= Brandon Proctor =

American sound engineer

- Occupation: Sound engineer

Brandon Proctor is an American sound engineer. He was nominated for two Academy Awards in the category Best Sound for the films Black Panther and Sinners.

== Selected filmography ==
- All Is Lost (2013)
- A Quiet Place (2018)
- Black Panther (2018; co-nominated with Steve Boeddeker and Peter J. Devlin)
- Sinners (2025; co-nominated with Chris Welcker, Benjamin A. Burtt, Felipe Pacheco and Steve Boeddeker)
