= José Antonio García (sound mixer) =

Mexican sound mixer

- Born: Mexico
- Occupation: Sound mixer
- Years active: 1987–present

José Antonio García is a Mexican sound mixer. He was nominated at the 85th Academy Awards for the film Argo in the category of Best Sound Mixing. He shared his nomination with John T. Reitz and Gregg Rudloff. He was also nominated at the 91st Academy Awards, along with Skip Lievsay and Craig Henighan, for the film Roma.

== Selected filmography ==
- One Battle after Another (2025)
- Nope (2022)
- Amsterdam (2022)
- Dog (2022)
- The Little Things (2020)
- Da 5 Bloods (2020)
- Bad Hair (2020)
- Richard Jewell (2019)
- Velvet Buzzsaw (2019)
- Bumblebee (2018)
- Roma (2018)
- Roman J. Israel, Esq. (2017)
- Hostiles (2017)
- Carne y Arena (2017)
- Live by Night (2016)
- Sully (2016)
- Joy (2015)
- The Hunger Games: Mockingjay - Part 2 (2015)
- Dog (2015)
- The Hunger Games: Mockingjay - Part 1 (2014)
- The Homesman (2014)
- Nebraska (2013)
- Iron Man 3 (2013)
- To the Wonder (2012)
- Argo (2012)
- Marvel's The Avengers (2012)
- J. Edgar (2012)
- The Descendants (2011)
- Thor (2011)
- Water for Elephants (2011)
- Due Date (2010)
- Biutiful (2010)
- The Kids Are All Right (2010)
- All About Steve (2009)
- The Soloist (2009)
- Get Smart (2008)
- The Great Buck Howard (2008)
- Evan Almighty (2007)
- Babel (2006)
- The Shaggy Dog (2006)
- Kicking & Screaming (2005)
- Sideways (2004)
- The Assassination of Richard Nixon (2004)
- 21 Grams (2003)
- Bruce Almighty (2003)
- Trapped (2002)
- Ten Tiny Love Stories (2002)
- Dragonfly (2002)
- Y Tu Mamá También (2001)
- Nutty Professor II: The Klumps (2000)
- Things You Can Tell Just by Looking at Her (2000)
- The Thirteenth Floor (1999)
- Godzilla (1998)
- Home Alone 3 (1997)
- Liar Liar (1997)
- The Nutty Professor (1996)
- A Little Princess (1995)
- Kalifornia (1994)
- CB4 (1993)
- Critters 4 (1992)
- Critters 3 (1991)
- Sólo Con Tu Pareja (1991)
- Gaby: A True Story (1987)
