= Gareth John (sound engineer) =

British sound engineer

- Born: United Kingdom
- Occupation: Sound engineer
- Years active: 1999–present

Gareth John is a British sound engineer. He won two Academy Awards in the category Best Sound for the films Dune: Part Two and F1.

At the 78th British Academy Film Awards, he won a BAFTA Award for Best Sound. His win was shared with Ron Bartlett, Doug Hemphill and Richard King.

== Selected filmography ==
- The Man From U.N.C.L.E. (2015)
- The Foreigner (2017)
- War Machine (2017)
- The Mercy (2018)
- The King (2019; won for Best Sound Recording and Best Soundtrack at the ASSG Awards)
- The Old Guard (2020)
- Eternals (2021)
- Catherine Called Birdy (2022)
- Ant-Man and the Wasp: Quantumania (2023)
- Dune: Part Two (2024; co-won an Academy Award, a BAFTA and AMPS Award)
- The Gorge (2025)
- F1 (2025; co-won an Academy Award, co-won a BAFTA)
