= List of accolades received by The Shape of Water =

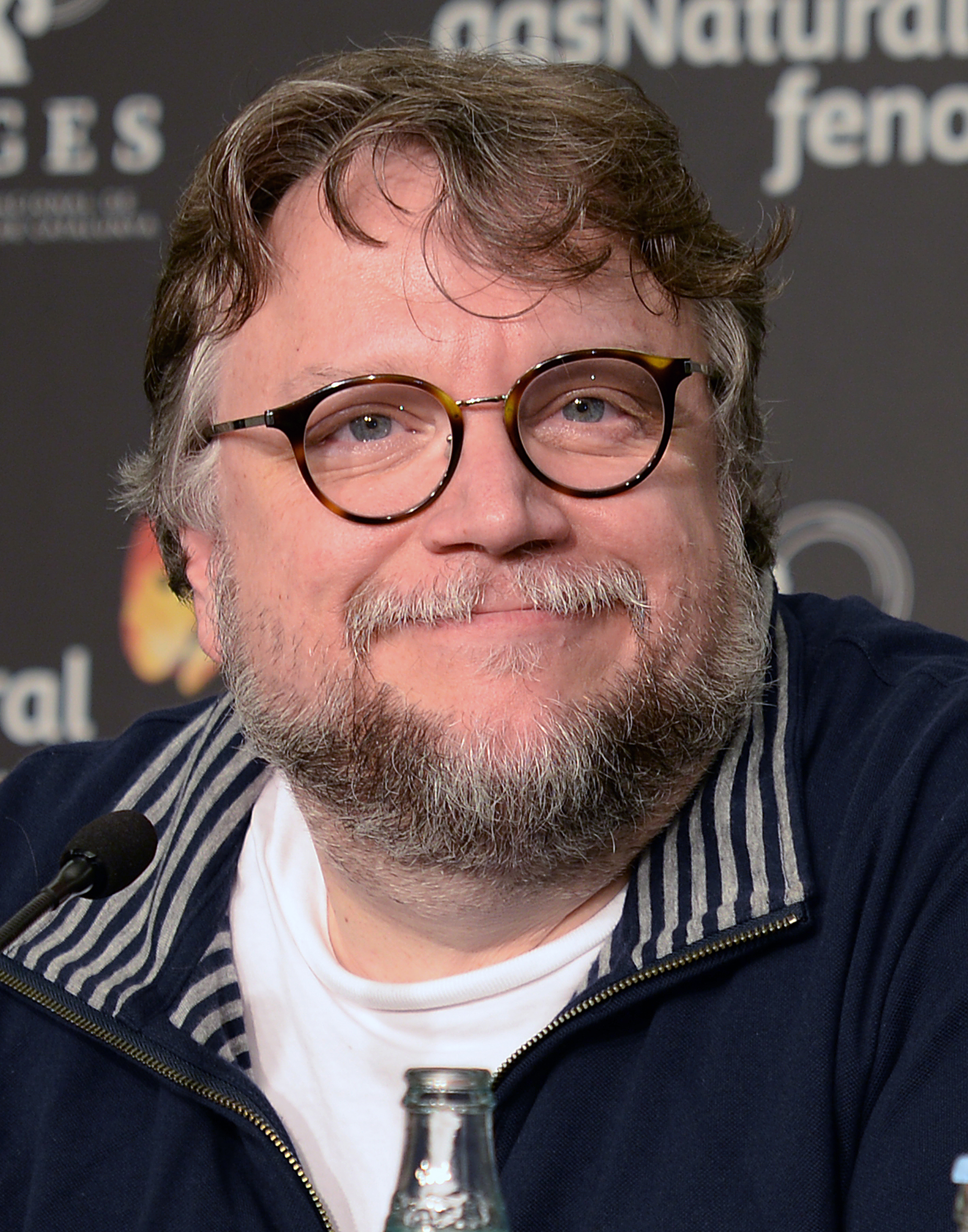
- Guillermo del Toro won several accolades for directing and co-writing The Shape of Water.
Accolades
Award	Wins	Nominations
AACTA International Awards	0	3
AARP Movies for Grownups Awards	2	4
Academy Awards	4	13
African-American Film Critics Association	1	1
Alliance of Women Film Journalists	3	6
American Cinema Editors Awards	0	1
American Society of Cinematographers	0	1
Art Directors Guild Awards	1	1
Austin Film Critics Association	4	10
Black Reel Awards	1	1
Boston Society of Film Critics	4	4
British Academy Film Awards	3	12
Casting Society of America	0	1
Cinema Audio Society Awards	0	1
Chicago Film Critics Association	0	7
Costume Designers Guild Awards	1	1
Critics' Choice Movie Awards	4	14
Dallas–Fort Worth Film Critics Association	8	8
Detroit Film Critics Society	0	6
Directors Guild of America Awards	1	1
Directors Guild of Canada	3	3
Dorian Awards	1	1
Evening Standard British Film Awards	0	1
Florida Film Critics Circle	0	9
Georgia Film Critics Association	0	8
GLAAD Media Awards	0	1
Golden Globe Awards	2	7
Grammy Awards	0	1
Grande Prêmio do Cinema Brasileiro	0	1
Grammy Awards	0	1
Hollywood Film Awards	1	1
Hollywood Music in Media Awards	1	1
Hollywood Professional Association	1	2
Houston Film Critics Society	3	9
Hugo Awards	0	1
IGN Awards	1	4
Imagen Awards	0	2
IndieWire Critics Poll	3	3
IFTA Film & Drama Awards	0	2
Japan Academy Film Prize	0	1
London Film Critics' Circle	1	4
Los Angeles Film Critics Association	5	5
Make-Up Artists and Hair Stylists Guild	0	1
National Society of Film Critics	2	2
New York Film Critics Online	2	2
Nebula Awards	1	1
Online Film Critics Society	5	8
Palm Springs International Film Festival	1	1
Producers Guild of America Award	1	1
San Diego Film Critics Society	2	8
San Francisco Bay Area Film Critics Circle	2	10
Satellite Awards	1	9
Saturn Awards	1	9
Screen Actors Guild Awards	0	2
Seattle Film Critics Society	0	6
St. Louis Film Critics Association	8	12
Society of Camera Operators	0	1
Toronto Film Critics Association	1	1
Vancouver Film Critics Circle	0	1
Venice Film Festival	4	4
Washington D.C. Area Film Critics Association	0	7
Women Film Critics Circle	0	3
Writers Guild of America Awards	0	1

Totals (Note: Certain award groups do not simply award one winner. They acknowledge several different recipients, have runners-up, and have third place. Since this is a specific recognition and is different from losing an award, runner-up mentions are considered wins in this award tally. For simplification and to avoid errors, each award in this list has been presumed to have had a prior nomination.)
- Wins: 91
- Nominations: 263

The Shape of Water is a 2017 American romantic fantasy film directed and produced by Guillermo del Toro. The film, written by del Toro and Vanessa Taylor, follows a mute custodian at a high-security government laboratory who falls in love with a captured humanoid amphibian creature. It stars Sally Hawkins, with Michael Shannon, Richard Jenkins, Doug Jones, Michael Stuhlbarg, and Octavia Spencer in featured roles. Alexandre Desplat composed the film's musical score, while Paul Denham Austerberry, Jeff Melvin, and Shane Vieau were responsible for the production design.

The film premiered at the 74th Venice International Film Festival on August 31, 2017, where it won the Golden Lion. Following successful screenings at the Telluride Film Festival, the Toronto International Film Festival, and the BFI London Film Festival, Fox Searchlight gave the film a limited release in New York City on December 1 before its official wide release in the United States on December 8. The film earned a worldwide box office total of more than $195 million. Rotten Tomatoes, a review aggregator, surveyed 454 reviews and judged 92% to be positive.

The Shape of Water garnered several awards and nominations with particular praise for del Toro's direction, the cast, Desplat's score, and the production design. The film earned thirteen nominations at the 90th Academy Awards, and went on to win four awards, including Best Picture and Best Director. It is the second fantasy film to win Best Picture after The Lord of the Rings: The Return of the King (2003). It received twelve nominations at the 71st British Academy Film Awards, winning three awards, including Best Direction, Best Original Music, and Best Production Design. At the 75th Golden Globe Awards, the film earned seven nominations, winning Best Director and Best Original Score.

At the 29th Producers Guild of America Awards, The Shape of Water won for Best Theatrical Motion Picture. Del Toro won Outstanding Directing – Feature Film at the 70th Directors Guild of America Awards. The film received fourteen nominations at the 23rd Critics' Choice Awards and won four awards including Best Picture. In addition, the American Film Institute selected it as one of the top 10 films of the year.

== Accolades ==
List of accolades received by The Shape of Water
Award	Date of ceremony	Category	Recipient(s)	Result	Ref.
AACTA International Awards	January 5, 2018	Best Film	The Shape of Water	Nominated	
AACTA International Awards	January 5, 2018	Best Direction	Guillermo del Toro	Nominated	
AACTA International Awards	January 5, 2018	Best Actress	Sally Hawkins	Nominated	
AARP Movies for Grownups Awards	February 5, 2018	Best Movie for Grownups	The Shape of Water	Nominated	
AARP Movies for Grownups Awards	February 5, 2018	Best Supporting Actor	Richard Jenkins	Won	
AARP Movies for Grownups Awards	February 5, 2018	Best Director	Guillermo del Toro	Won	
AARP Movies for Grownups Awards	February 5, 2018	Best Screenwriter	Guillermo del Toro	Nominated	
Academy Awards	March 4, 2018	Best Picture	Guillermo del Toro and J. Miles Dale	Won	
Academy Awards	March 4, 2018	Best Director	Guillermo del Toro	Won	
Academy Awards	March 4, 2018	Best Actress	Sally Hawkins	Nominated	
Academy Awards	March 4, 2018	Best Supporting Actor	Richard Jenkins	Nominated	
Academy Awards	March 4, 2018	Best Supporting Actress	Octavia Spencer	Nominated	
Academy Awards	March 4, 2018	Best Original Screenplay	Guillermo del Toro and Vanessa Taylor	Nominated	
Academy Awards	March 4, 2018	Best Cinematography	Dan Laustsen	Nominated	
Academy Awards	March 4, 2018	Best Costume Design	Luis Sequeira	Nominated	
Academy Awards	March 4, 2018	Best Film Editing	Sidney Wolinsky	Nominated	
Academy Awards	March 4, 2018	Best Original Score	Alexandre Desplat	Won	
Academy Awards	March 4, 2018	Best Production Design	Paul Denham Austerberry, Shane Vieau, and Jeff Melvin	Won	
Academy Awards	March 4, 2018	Best Sound Editing	Nathan Robitaille and Nelson Ferreira	Nominated	
Academy Awards	March 4, 2018	Best Sound Mixing	Christian Cooke, Brad Zoern, and Glen Gauthier	Nominated	
African-American Film Critics Association	December 12, 2017	Top Ten Films	The Shape of Water	7th place	
Alliance of Women Film Journalists	January 9, 2018	Best Film	The Shape of Water	Won	
Alliance of Women Film Journalists	January 9, 2018	Best Director	Guillermo del Toro	Won	
Alliance of Women Film Journalists	January 9, 2018	Best Actress	Sally Hawkins	Nominated	
Alliance of Women Film Journalists	January 9, 2018	Best Cinematography	Dan Laustsen	Nominated	
Alliance of Women Film Journalists	January 9, 2018	Best Editing	Sidney Wolinsky	Nominated	
Alliance of Women Film Journalists	January 9, 2018	Bravest Performance	Sally Hawkins	Won (Note: Tied with Margot Robbie for I, Tonya)	
American Cinema Editors	January 26, 2018	Best Edited Feature Film – Dramatic	Sidney Wolinsky	Nominated	
American Film Institute	January 5, 2018	Top Ten Films of the Year	The Shape of Water	Won	
American Society of Cinematographers	February 17, 2018	Outstanding Achievement in Cinematography in Theatrical Releases	Dan Laustsen	Nominated	
Art Directors Guild Awards	January 27, 2018	Excellence in Production Design for a Period Film	Paul Denham Austerberry	Won	
Austin Film Critics Association	January 8, 2018	Best Film	The Shape of Water	Nominated	
Austin Film Critics Association	January 8, 2018	Best Director	Guillermo del Toro	Won	
Austin Film Critics Association	January 8, 2018	Best Actress	Sally Hawkins	Nominated	
Austin Film Critics Association	January 8, 2018	Best Supporting Actor	Richard Jenkins	Nominated	
Austin Film Critics Association	January 8, 2018	Best Supporting Actress	Octavia Spencer	Nominated	
Austin Film Critics Association	January 8, 2018	Best Original Screenplay	Guillermo del Toro and Vanessa Taylor	Nominated	
Austin Film Critics Association	January 8, 2018	Best Cinematography	Dan Laustsen	Nominated	
Austin Film Critics Association	January 8, 2018	Best Original Score	Alexandre Desplat	Won	
Austin Film Critics Association	January 8, 2018	Special Honorary Award	Doug Jones	Won	
Austin Film Critics Association	January 8, 2018	Top 10 Films	The Shape of Water	Won	
Black Reel Awards	February 23, 2018	Outstanding Supporting Actress	Octavia Spencer	Nominated	
Boston Society of Film Critics	December 10, 2017	Best Film	The Shape of Water	Runner-up	
Boston Society of Film Critics	December 10, 2017	Best Director	Guillermo del Toro	Runner-up	
Boston Society of Film Critics	December 10, 2017	Best Actress	Sally Hawkins	Won	
Boston Society of Film Critics	December 10, 2017	Best Use of Music in a Film	Alexandre Desplat	Runner-up	
British Academy Film Awards	February 18, 2018	Best Film	Guillermo del Toro and J. Miles Dale	Nominated	
British Academy Film Awards	February 18, 2018	Best Direction	Guillermo del Toro	Won	
British Academy Film Awards	February 18, 2018	Best Actress in a Leading Role	Sally Hawkins	Nominated	
British Academy Film Awards	February 18, 2018	Best Actress in a Supporting Role	Octavia Spencer	Nominated	
British Academy Film Awards	February 18, 2018	Best Original Screenplay	Guillermo del Toro and Vanessa Taylor	Nominated	
British Academy Film Awards	February 18, 2018	Best Cinematography	Dan Laustsen	Nominated	
British Academy Film Awards	February 18, 2018	Best Film Music	Alexandre Desplat	Won	
British Academy Film Awards	February 18, 2018	Best Editing	Sidney Wolinsky	Nominated	
British Academy Film Awards	February 18, 2018	Best Sound	Christian Cooke, Glen Gauthier, Nathan Robitaille, and Brad Zoern	Nominated	
British Academy Film Awards	February 18, 2018	Best Production Design	Paul Denham Austerberry, Shane Vieau, and Jeff Melvin	Won	
British Academy Film Awards	February 18, 2018	Best Special Visual Effects	Dennis Berardi, Trey Harrell, and Kevin Scott	Nominated	
British Academy Film Awards	February 18, 2018	Best Costume Design	Luis Sequeira	Nominated	
Casting Society of America	January 18, 2018	Studio or Independent – Drama	Robin D. Cook and Jonathan Oliveira	Nominated	
Chicago Film Critics Association	December 12, 2017	Best Film	The Shape of Water	Nominated	
Chicago Film Critics Association	December 12, 2017	Best Director	Guillermo del Toro	Nominated	
Chicago Film Critics Association	December 12, 2017	Best Actress	Sally Hawkins	Nominated	
Chicago Film Critics Association	December 12, 2017	Best Original Screenplay	Guillermo del Toro and Vanessa Taylor	Nominated	
Chicago Film Critics Association	December 12, 2017	Best Art Direction	The Shape of Water	Nominated	
Chicago Film Critics Association	December 12, 2017	Best Original Score	Alexandre Desplat	Nominated	
Chicago Film Critics Association	December 12, 2017	Best Cinematography	Dan Laustsen	Nominated	
Cinema Audio Society Awards	February 24, 2018	Outstanding Achievement in Sound Mixing for a Motion Picture – Live Action	Peter Cobbin, Christian Cooke, Glen Gauthier, Chris Navarro, Peter Persaud, and Brad Zoern	Nominated	
Costume Designers Guild	February 20, 2018	Excellence in Period Film	Luis Sequeira	Won	
Critics' Choice Movie Awards	January 11, 2018	Best Picture	The Shape of Water	Won	
Critics' Choice Movie Awards	January 11, 2018	Best Director	Guillermo del Toro	Won	
Critics' Choice Movie Awards	January 11, 2018	Best Actress	Sally Hawkins	Nominated	
Critics' Choice Movie Awards	January 11, 2018	Best Supporting Actor	Richard Jenkins	Nominated	
Critics' Choice Movie Awards	January 11, 2018	Best Supporting Actress	Octavia Spencer	Nominated	
Critics' Choice Movie Awards	January 11, 2018	Best Original Screenplay	Guillermo del Toro and Vanessa Taylor	Nominated	
Critics' Choice Movie Awards	January 11, 2018	Best Cinematography	Dan Laustsen	Nominated	
Critics' Choice Movie Awards	January 11, 2018	Best Art Direction	Paul Denham Austerberry, Shane Vieau, and Jeff Melvin	Won	
Critics' Choice Movie Awards	January 11, 2018	Best Editing	Sidney Wolinsky	Nominated	
Critics' Choice Movie Awards	January 11, 2018	Best Costume Design	Luis Sequeira	Nominated	
Critics' Choice Movie Awards	January 11, 2018	Best Hair and Makeup	The Shape of Water	Nominated	
Critics' Choice Movie Awards	January 11, 2018	Best Visual Effects	The Shape of Water	Nominated	
Critics' Choice Movie Awards	January 11, 2018	Best Sci-Fi/Horror Movie	The Shape of Water	Nominated	
Critics' Choice Movie Awards	January 11, 2018	Best Score	Alexandre Desplat	Won	
Dallas–Fort Worth Film Critics Association	December 13, 2017	Best Film	The Shape of Water	Won	
Dallas–Fort Worth Film Critics Association	December 13, 2017	Best Director	Guillermo del Toro	Won	
Dallas–Fort Worth Film Critics Association	December 13, 2017	Best Actress	Sally Hawkins	Won	
Dallas–Fort Worth Film Critics Association	December 13, 2017	Best Supporting Actor	Richard Jenkins	3rd Place	
Dallas–Fort Worth Film Critics Association	December 13, 2017	Best Supporting Actress	Octavia Spencer	5th Place	
Dallas–Fort Worth Film Critics Association	December 13, 2017	Best Screenplay	Guillermo del Toro and Vanessa Taylor	2nd Place	
Dallas–Fort Worth Film Critics Association	December 13, 2017	Best Cinematography	Dan Laustsen	Won	
Dallas–Fort Worth Film Critics Association	December 13, 2017	Best Musical Score	Alexandre Desplat	Won	
Detroit Film Critics Society	December 7, 2017	Best Film	The Shape of Water	Nominated	
Detroit Film Critics Society	December 7, 2017	Best Director	Guillermo del Toro	Nominated	
Detroit Film Critics Society	December 7, 2017	Best Actress	Sally Hawkins	Nominated	
Detroit Film Critics Society	December 7, 2017	Best Supporting Actor	Richard Jenkins	Nominated	
Detroit Film Critics Society	December 7, 2017	Best Screenplay	Guillermo del Toro and Vanessa Taylor	Nominated	
Detroit Film Critics Society	December 7, 2017	Best Use of Music	The Shape of Water	Nominated	
Directors Guild of America Awards	February 3, 2018	Outstanding Directing – Feature Film	Guillermo del Toro	Won	
Directors Guild of Canada	October 20, 2018	Best Production Design – Feature Film	Paul Denham Austerberry	Won	
Directors Guild of Canada	October 20, 2018	Best Picture Editing – Feature Film	Sidney Wolinsky	Won	
Directors Guild of Canada	October 20, 2018	Best Sound Editing – Feature Film	Nathan Robitaille, Nelson Ferreira, Jill Purdy, Robert Hegedus, Kevin Howard, Alex Bullick, Dashen Naidoo, Tyler Whitham, Dustin Harris, Cam McLauchlin	Won	
Dorian Awards	February 24, 2018	Film of the Year	The Shape of Water	Nominated	
Dorian Awards	February 24, 2018	Director of the Year	Guillermo del Toro	Nominated	
Dorian Awards	February 24, 2018	Best Performance of the Year — Actress	Sally Hawkins	Won	
Dorian Awards	February 24, 2018	Supporting Film Performance of the Year — Actor	Richard Jenkins	Nominated	
Dorian Awards	February 24, 2018	Screenplay of the Year	Guillermo del Toro and Vanessa Taylor	Nominated	
Dorian Awards	February 24, 2018	Visually Striking Film of the Year	The Shape of Water	Won	
Evening Standard British Film Awards	February 8, 2018	Best Actress	Sally Hawkins	Nominated	
Florida Film Critics Circle	December 23, 2017	Best Film	The Shape of Water	Nominated	
Florida Film Critics Circle	December 23, 2017	Best Director	Guillermo del Toro	Nominated	
Florida Film Critics Circle	December 23, 2017	Best Actress	Sally Hawkins	Nominated	
Florida Film Critics Circle	December 23, 2017	Best Original Screenplay	Guillermo del Toro and Vanessa Taylor	Nominated	
Florida Film Critics Circle	December 23, 2017	Best Cast	The cast of The Shape of Water	Nominated	
Florida Film Critics Circle	December 23, 2017	Best Cinematography	Dan Laustsen	Nominated	
Florida Film Critics Circle	December 23, 2017	Best Visual Effects	The Shape of Water	Nominated	
Florida Film Critics Circle	December 23, 2017	Best Art Direction/Production Design	The Shape of Water	Nominated	
Florida Film Critics Circle	December 23, 2017	Best Score	Alexandre Desplat	Nominated	
Georgia Film Critics Association	January 12, 2018	Best Picture	The Shape of Water	Nominated	
Georgia Film Critics Association	January 12, 2018	Best Director	Guillermo del Toro	Nominated	
Georgia Film Critics Association	January 12, 2018	Best Actress	Sally Hawkins	Nominated	
Georgia Film Critics Association	January 12, 2018	Best Supporting Actor	Richard Jenkins	Nominated	
Georgia Film Critics Association	January 12, 2018	Best Original Screenplay	Guillermo del Toro and Vanessa Taylor	Nominated	
Georgia Film Critics Association	January 12, 2018	Best Cinematography	Dan Laustsen	Nominated	
Georgia Film Critics Association	January 12, 2018	Best Production Design	Paul Denham Austerberry, Shane Vieau, and Jeff Melvin	Nominated	
Georgia Film Critics Association	January 12, 2018	Best Original Score	Alexandre Desplat	Nominated	
GLAAD Media Awards	April 12, 2018	Outstanding Film – Wide Release	The Shape of Water	Nominated	
Golden Eagle Award	January 25, 2019	Best Foreign Language Film	The Shape of Water	Nominated	
Golden Globe Awards	January 7, 2018	Best Motion Picture – Drama	The Shape of Water	Nominated	
Golden Globe Awards	January 7, 2018	Best Actress – Motion Picture Drama	Sally Hawkins	Nominated	
Golden Globe Awards	January 7, 2018	Best Supporting Actor – Motion Picture	Richard Jenkins	Nominated	
Golden Globe Awards	January 7, 2018	Best Supporting Actress – Motion Picture	Octavia Spencer	Nominated	
Golden Globe Awards	January 7, 2018	Best Director	Guillermo del Toro	Won	
Golden Globe Awards	January 7, 2018	Best Screenplay	Guillermo del Toro and Vanessa Taylor	Nominated	
Golden Globe Awards	January 7, 2018	Best Original Score	Alexandre Desplat	Won	
Grammy Awards	February 10, 2019	Best Score Soundtrack for Visual Media	Alexandre Desplat	Nominated	
Hollywood Film Awards	November 5, 2017	Hollywood Editor Award	Sidney Wolinsky	Won	
Hollywood Music in Media Awards	November 16, 2017	Best Original Score – Fantasy/Horror/Sci-Fi Film	Alexandre Desplat	Won	
Hollywood Professional Association	November 15, 2018	Outstanding Color Grading – Feature Film	Chris Wallace (Deluxe, Toronto)	Nominated	
Hollywood Professional Association	November 15, 2018	Outstanding Sound – Feature Film	Christian Cooke, Brad Zoern, Nelson Ferreira, and Nathan Robitaille (Deluxe, Toronto)	Won	
Houston Film Critics Society	January 6, 2018	Best Picture	The Shape of Water	Nominated	
Houston Film Critics Society	January 6, 2018	Best Director	Guillermo del Toro	Nominated	
Houston Film Critics Society	January 6, 2018	Best Actress	Sally Hawkins	Won	
Houston Film Critics Society	January 6, 2018	Best Supporting Actor	Richard Jenkins	Nominated	
Houston Film Critics Society	January 6, 2018	Best Supporting Actress	Octavia Spencer	Nominated	
Houston Film Critics Society	January 6, 2018	Best Cinematography	Dan Laustsen	Nominated	
Houston Film Critics Society	January 6, 2018	Best Original Score	Alexandre Desplat	Won	
Houston Film Critics Society	January 6, 2018	Best Visual Effects	The Shape of Water	Nominated	
Houston Film Critics Society	January 6, 2018	Best Poster	The Shape of Water	Won	
Hugo Awards	August 19, 2018	Best Dramatic Presentation	Guillermo del Toro and Vanessa Taylor	Nominated	
IGN Awards	December 19, 2017	Movie of the Year	The Shape of Water	Nominated	
IGN Awards	December 19, 2017	Best Sci-Fi/Fantasy Movie	The Shape of Water	Runner-up	
IGN Awards	December 19, 2017	Best Lead Performer in a Movie	Sally Hawkins	Nominated	
IGN Awards	December 19, 2017	Best Director	Guillermo del Toro	Nominated	
Imagen Awards	August 25, 2018	Best Picture	The Shape of Water	Nominated	
Imagen Awards	August 25, 2018	Best Director	Guillermo del Toro	Nominated	
IndieWire Critics Poll	December 19, 2017	Best Picture	The Shape of Water	6th Place	
IndieWire Critics Poll	December 19, 2017	Best Actress	Sally Hawkins	4th Place	
IndieWire Critics Poll	December 19, 2017	Best Cinematography	Dan Laustsen	4th Place	
IFTA Film & Drama Awards	15 February 2018	International Film	The Shape of Water	Nominated	
IFTA Film & Drama Awards	15 February 2018	International Actress	Sally Hawkins	Nominated	
Japan Academy Film Prize	March 1, 2019	Outstanding Foreign Language Film	The Shape of Water	Nominated	
London Film Critics Circle	January 28, 2018	Film of the Year	The Shape of Water	Nominated	
London Film Critics Circle	January 28, 2018	Director of the Year	Guillermo del Toro	Nominated	
London Film Critics Circle	January 28, 2018	Actress of the Year	Sally Hawkins	Nominated	
London Film Critics Circle	January 28, 2018	British/Irish Actress of the Year	Sally Hawkins (Note: Also for Maudie and Paddington 2)	Won	
Los Angeles Film Critics Association	January 13, 2018	Best Director	Guillermo del Toro	Won (Note: Tied with Luca Guadagnino for Call Me by Your Name)	
Los Angeles Film Critics Association	January 13, 2018	Best Actress	Sally Hawkins	Won	
Los Angeles Film Critics Association	January 13, 2018	Best Cinematography	Dan Laustsen	Won	
Los Angeles Film Critics Association	January 13, 2018	Best Music	Alexandre Desplat	Runner-up	
Los Angeles Film Critics Association	January 13, 2018	Best Production Design	Paul Denham Austerberry	Runner-up	
Make-Up Artists and Hair Stylists Guild	February 24, 2018	Best Special Make-Up Effects in a Feature-Length Motion Picture	Mike Hill and Shane Mahan	Nominated	
Motion Picture Sound Editors	February 18, 2018	Best Sound Editing: Music in a Feature Film	Cam McLaughlin, Rob Hegedus, Dustin Harris	Nominated	
Motion Picture Sound Editors	February 18, 2018	Best Sound Editing: Dialogue and ADR in a Feature Film	Nathan Robitaille, Nelson Ferreira, Jill Purdy	Nominated	
Motion Picture Sound Editors	February 18, 2018	Best Sound Editing: Sound Effects and Foley in a Feature Film	Nathan Robitaille, Tyler Witham, Dashen Naidoo, Kevin Howard, Alex Bullick, Steve Bain, Pete Persaud, Gina Gyles	Nominated	
National Society of Film Critics	January 6, 2018	Best Actress	Sally Hawkins	Won	
National Society of Film Critics	January 6, 2018	Best Supporting Actor	Michael Stuhlbarg (Note: Also for Call Me by Your Name and The Post)	2nd Place	
Nebula Award	May 20, 2018	Ray Bradbury Award	Guillermo del Toro (director and writer) and Vanessa Taylor (writer)	Nominated	
New York Film Critics Online	December 10, 2017	Best Cinematography	Dan Laustsen	Won	
New York Film Critics Online	December 10, 2017	Top Ten Films	The Shape of Water	Won	
Online Film Critics Society	December 28, 2017	Best Picture	The Shape of Water	Runner-up	
Online Film Critics Society	December 28, 2017	Best Director	Guillermo del Toro	Runner-up (Note: Tied with Jordan Peele for Get Out)	
Online Film Critics Society	December 28, 2017	Best Actress	Sally Hawkins	Won	
Online Film Critics Society	December 28, 2017	Best Supporting Actor	Richard Jenkins	Runner-up	
Online Film Critics Society	December 28, 2017	Best Original Screenplay	Guillermo del Toro and Vanessa Taylor	Nominated	
Online Film Critics Society	December 28, 2017	Best Editing	Sidney Wolinsky	Nominated	
Online Film Critics Society	December 28, 2017	Best Cinematography	Dan Laustsen	Runner-up	
Online Film Critics Society	December 28, 2017	Best Ensemble	The cast of The Shape of Water	Nominated	
Palm Springs International Film Festival	January 2, 2018	Vanguard Award	The Shape of Water	Won	
Producers Guild of America Awards	January 20, 2018	Best Theatrical Motion Picture	Guillermo del Toro and J. Miles Dale	Won	
San Diego Film Critics Society	December 11, 2017	Best Director	Guillermo del Toro	Nominated	
San Diego Film Critics Society	December 11, 2017	Best Actress	Sally Hawkins	Runner-up	
San Diego Film Critics Society	December 11, 2017	Best Editing	Sidney Wolinsky	Nominated	
San Diego Film Critics Society	December 11, 2017	Best Cinematography	Dan Laustsen	Nominated	
San Diego Film Critics Society	December 11, 2017	Best Production Design	Paul Denham Austerberry	Won	
San Diego Film Critics Society	December 11, 2017	Best Visual Effects	The Shape of Water	Nominated	
San Diego Film Critics Society	December 11, 2017	Best Costume Design	Luis Sequeira	Nominated	
San Diego Film Critics Society	December 11, 2017	Best Original Score	The Shape of Water	Nominated	
San Francisco Film Critics Circle	December 10, 2017	Best Film	The Shape of Water	Nominated	
San Francisco Film Critics Circle	December 10, 2017	Best Director	Guillermo del Toro	Won	
San Francisco Film Critics Circle	December 10, 2017	Best Actress	Sally Hawkins	Nominated	
San Francisco Film Critics Circle	December 10, 2017	Best Supporting Actor	Richard Jenkins	Nominated	
San Francisco Film Critics Circle	December 10, 2017	Best Original Screenplay	Guillermo del Toro and Vanessa Taylor	Nominated	
San Francisco Film Critics Circle	December 10, 2017	Best Cinematography	Dan Laustsen	Nominated	
San Francisco Film Critics Circle	December 10, 2017	Best Production Design	Paul Denham Austerberry	Won	
San Francisco Film Critics Circle	December 10, 2017	Best Original Score	Alexandre Desplat	Nominated	
San Francisco Film Critics Circle	December 10, 2017	Best Film Editing	Sidney Wolinsky	Nominated	
Satellite Awards	February 10, 2018	Best Film	The Shape of Water	Nominated	
Satellite Awards	February 10, 2018	Best Director	Guillermo del Toro	Nominated	
Satellite Awards	February 10, 2018	Best Actress	Sally Hawkins	Won (Note: Tied with Diane Kruger for In the Fade)	
Satellite Awards	February 10, 2018	Best Supporting Actor	Michael Shannon	Nominated	
Satellite Awards	February 10, 2018	Best Original Screenplay	Guillermo del Toro and Vanessa Taylor	Nominated	
Satellite Awards	February 10, 2018	Best Cinematography	Dan Laustsen	Nominated	
Satellite Awards	February 10, 2018	Best Original Score	Alexandre Desplat	Nominated	
Satellite Awards	February 10, 2018	Best Visual Effects	The Shape of Water	Nominated	
Satellite Awards	February 10, 2018	Best Art Direction and Production Design	The Shape of Water	Won	
Satellite Awards	February 10, 2018	Best Film Editing	Sidney Wolinsky	Nominated	
Saturn Awards	June 27, 2018	Best Fantasy Film	The Shape of Water	Won	
Saturn Awards	June 27, 2018	Best Director	Guillermo del Toro	Nominated	
Saturn Awards	June 27, 2018	Best Actress	Sally Hawkins	Nominated	
Saturn Awards	June 27, 2018	Best Supporting Actress	Octavia Spencer	Nominated	
Saturn Awards	June 27, 2018	Best Writing	Guillermo del Toro and Vanessa Taylor	Nominated	
Saturn Awards	June 27, 2018	Best Make-up	Mike Hill and Shane Mahan	Nominated	
Saturn Awards	June 27, 2018	Best Music	Alexandre Desplat	Nominated	
Saturn Awards	June 27, 2018	Best Production Design	Paul Denham Austerberry	Nominated	
Saturn Awards	June 27, 2018	Best Editing	Sidney Wolinsky	Nominated	
Screen Actors Guild Awards	January 21, 2018	Outstanding Performance by a Female Actor in a Leading Role	Sally Hawkins	Nominated	
Screen Actors Guild Awards	January 21, 2018	Outstanding Performance by a Male Actor in a Supporting Role	Richard Jenkins	Nominated	
Seattle Film Critics Society	December 18, 2017	Best Actress	Sally Hawkins	Nominated	
Seattle Film Critics Society	December 18, 2017	Best Supporting Actor	Michael Shannon	Nominated	
Seattle Film Critics Society	December 18, 2017	Best Cinematography	Dan Laustsen	Nominated	
Seattle Film Critics Society	December 18, 2017	Best Costume Design	Luis Sequeira	Nominated	
Seattle Film Critics Society	December 18, 2017	Best Production Design	Paul Denham Austerberry, Shane Vieau, and Jeff Melvin	Nominated	
Seattle Film Critics Society	December 18, 2017	Best Visual Effects	Dennis Berardi, Luke Groves, Trey Harrell, and Kevin Scott	Nominated	
St. Louis Film Critics Association	December 17, 2017	Best Film	The Shape of Water	Won	
St. Louis Film Critics Association	December 17, 2017	Best Director	Guillermo del Toro	Won	
St. Louis Film Critics Association	December 17, 2017	Best Actress	Sally Hawkins	Runner-up	
St. Louis Film Critics Association	December 17, 2017	Best Supporting Actor	Richard Jenkins	Won	
St. Louis Film Critics Association	December 17, 2017	Best Supporting Actor	Michael Shannon	Nominated	
St. Louis Film Critics Association	December 17, 2017	Best Supporting Actress	Octavia Spencer	Nominated	
St. Louis Film Critics Association	December 17, 2017	Best Original Screenplay	Guillermo del Toro and Vanessa Taylor	Won	
St. Louis Film Critics Association	December 17, 2017	Best Cinematography	Dan Laustsen	Nominated	
St. Louis Film Critics Association	December 17, 2017	Best Editing	Sidney Wolinsky	Runner-up (Note: Tied with Lee Smith for Dunkirk)	
St. Louis Film Critics Association	December 17, 2017	Best Production Design	Paul Denham Austerberry	Won	
St. Louis Film Critics Association	December 17, 2017	Best Visual Effects	The Shape of Water	Runner-up	
St. Louis Film Critics Association	December 17, 2017	Best Score	Alexandre Desplat	Nominated	
Society of Operating Cameramen	February 7, 2018	Camera Operator of the Year – Film	Giles Corbeil	Nominated	
Toronto Film Critics Association	December 10, 2017	Best Actress	Sally Hawkins	Runner-up	
Vancouver Film Critics Circle	January 6, 2018	Best Actress	Sally Hawkins	Nominated	
Venice Film Festival	September 9, 2017	Golden Lion	The Shape of Water	Won	
Venice Film Festival	September 9, 2017	Future Film Festival Digital Award	The Shape of Water	Won	
Venice Film Festival	September 9, 2017	C. Smithers Foundation Award – CICT-UNESCO	The Shape of Water	Won	
Venice Film Festival	September 9, 2017	Soundtrack Stars Award – Best Soundtrack	Alexandre Desplat	Won	
Washington D.C. Area Film Critics Association	December 8, 2017	Best Director	Guillermo del Toro	Nominated	
Washington D.C. Area Film Critics Association	December 8, 2017	Best Actress	Sally Hawkins	Nominated	
Washington D.C. Area Film Critics Association	December 8, 2017	Best Original Screenplay	Guillermo del Toro and Vanessa Taylor	Nominated	
Washington D.C. Area Film Critics Association	December 8, 2017	Best Art Direction	Paul Denham Austerberry, Shane Vieau, and Jeff Melvin	Nominated	
Washington D.C. Area Film Critics Association	December 8, 2017	Best Cinematography	Dan Laustsen	Nominated	
Washington D.C. Area Film Critics Association	December 8, 2017	Best Editing	Sidney Wolinsky	Nominated	
Washington D.C. Area Film Critics Association	December 8, 2017	Best Score	Alexandre Desplat	Nominated	
Women Film Critics Circle	December 17, 2017	Best Actress	Sally Hawkins	Nominated	
Women Film Critics Circle	December 17, 2017	Best Female Action Hero	The Shape of Water	Nominated	
Women Film Critics Circle	December 17, 2017	Best Screen Couple	The Shape of Water	Nominated	
World Soundtrack Awards	October 17, 2018	Soundtrack Composer of the Year	Alexandre Desplat	Nominated	
Writers Guild of America Awards	February 11, 2018	Best Original Screenplay	Guillermo del Toro and Vanessa Taylor	Nominated	

== See also ==
- 2017 in film
