= 2017 Seattle Film Critics Society Awards =

Annual US film awards ceremony

2nd Seattle Film Critics Society Awards
- Date: December 18, 2017
- Site: Seattle, Washington

Highlights
- Best Picture: Drive My Car
- Most awards: Lady Bird / Phantom Thread (3)
- Most nominations: Blade Runner 2049 (8)

The 2nd Seattle Film Critics Society Awards were announced on December 18, 2017.

The nominations were announced on December 11, 2017.

== Winners and nominees ==
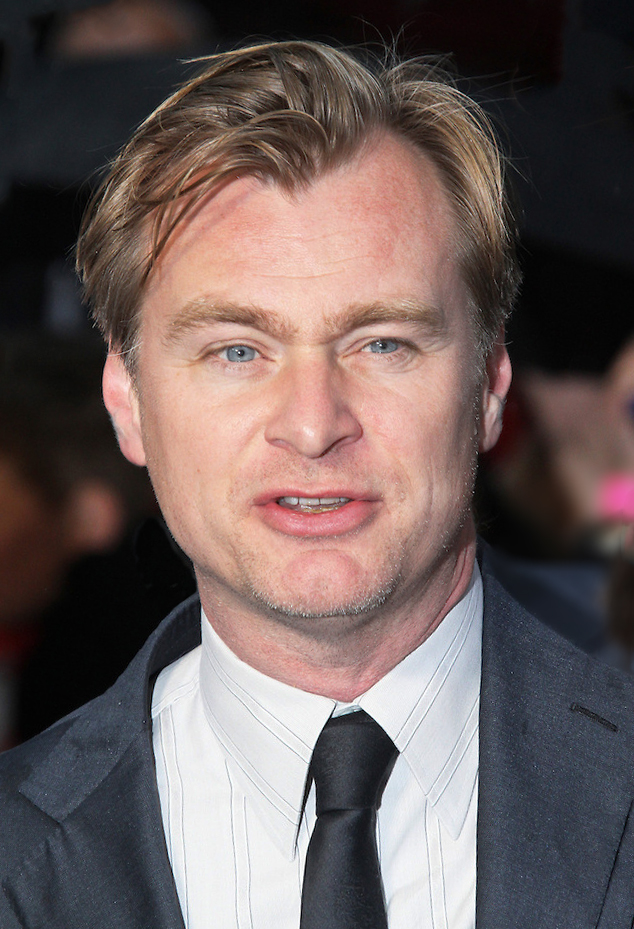
Christopher Nolan, Best Director winner

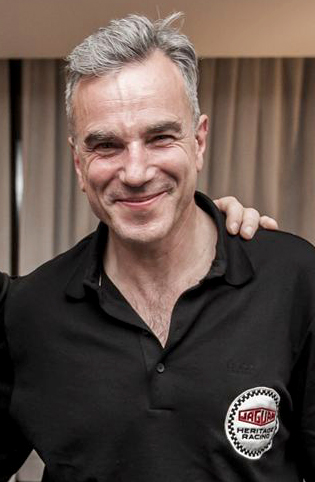
Daniel Day-Lewis, Best Actor in a Leading Role winner

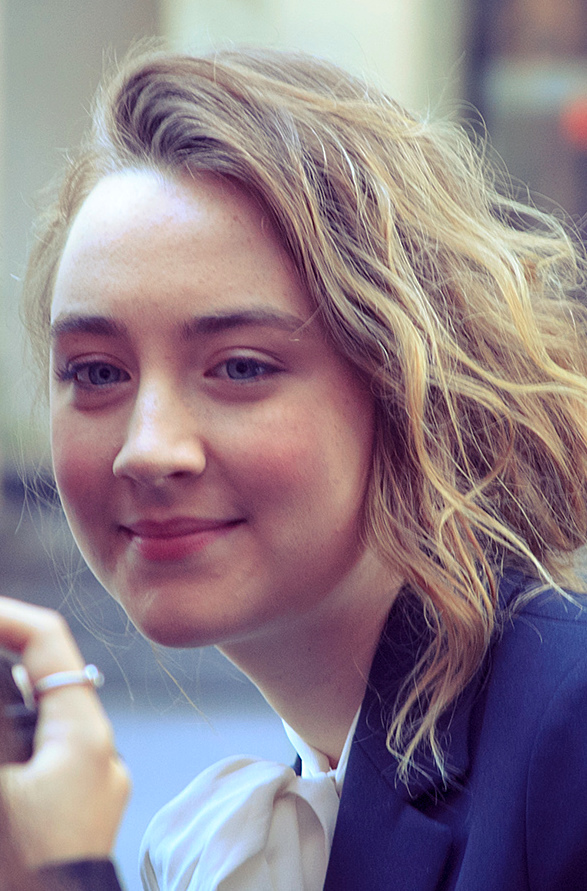
Saoirse Ronan, Best Actress in a Leading Role winner

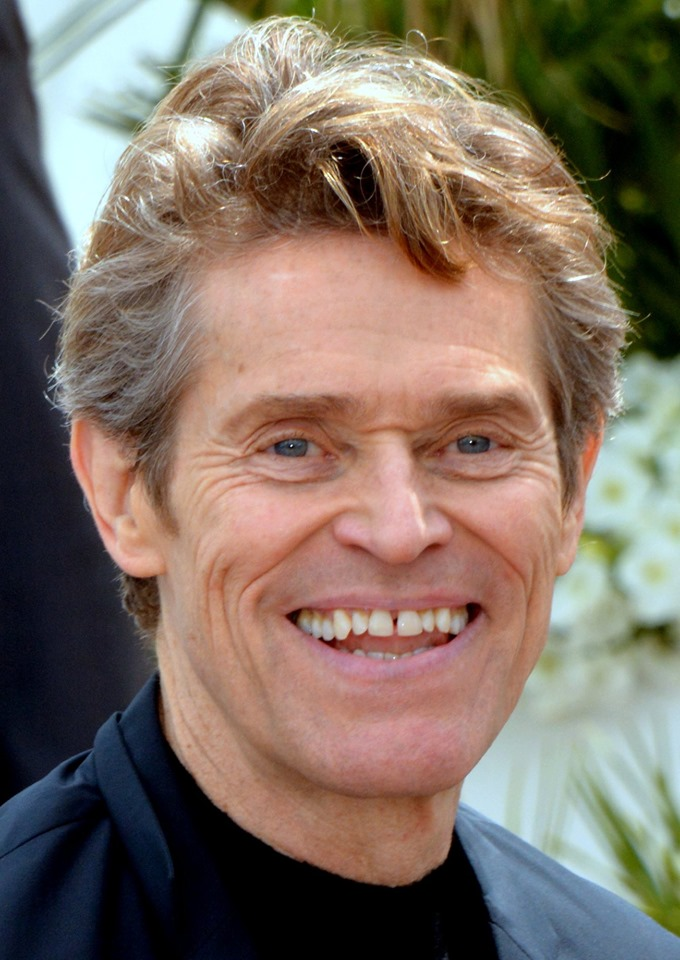
Willem Dafoe, Best Actor in a Supporting Role winner

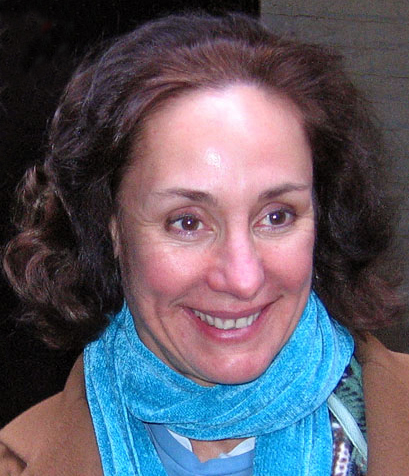
Laurie Metcalf, Best Actress in a Supporting Role winner

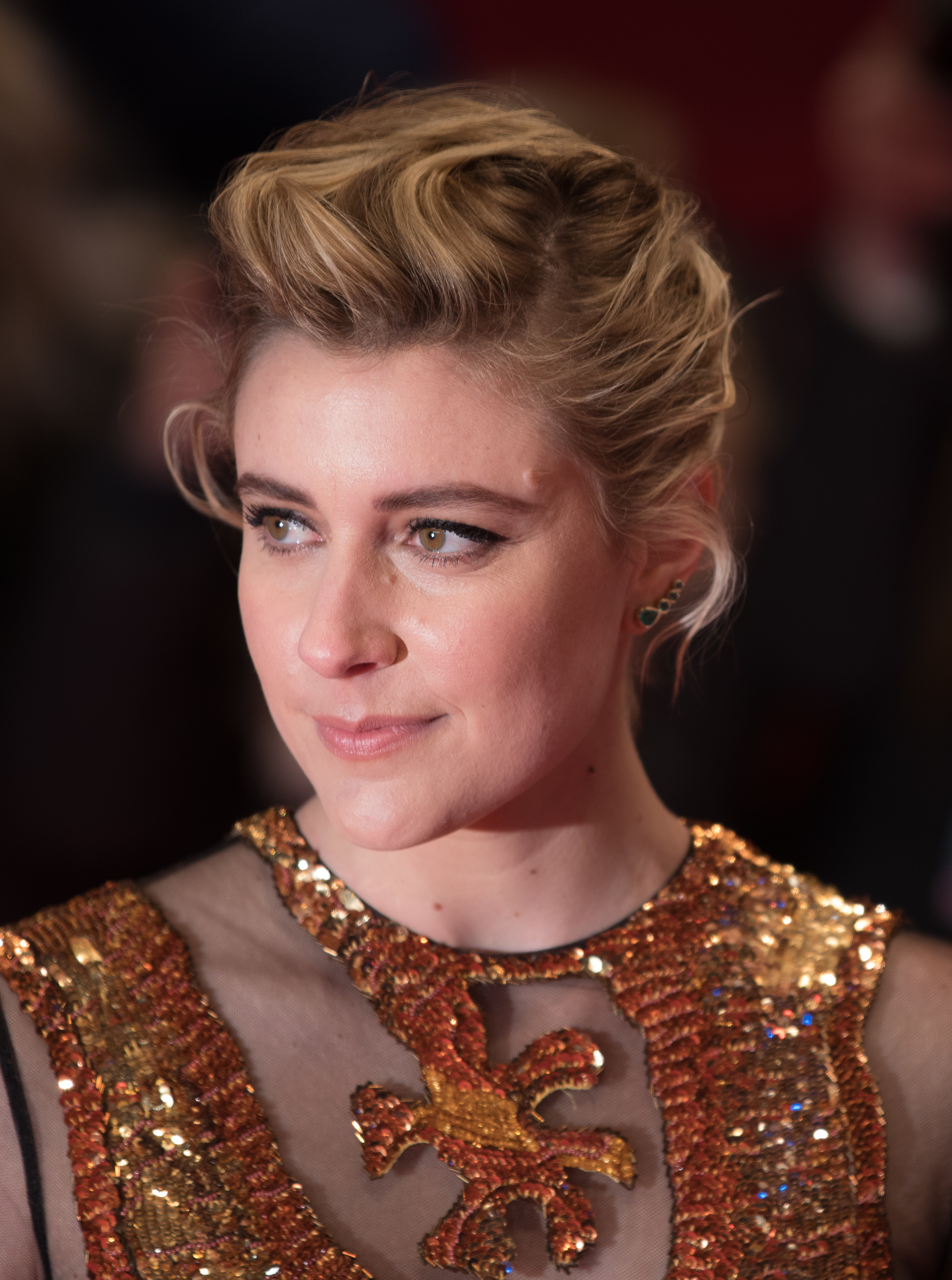
Greta Gerwig, Best Screenplay winner

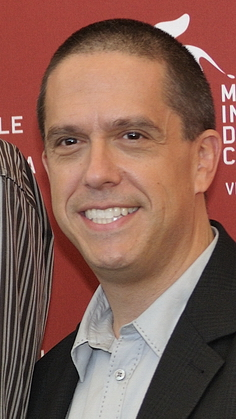
Lee Unkrich, Best Animated Feature co-winner

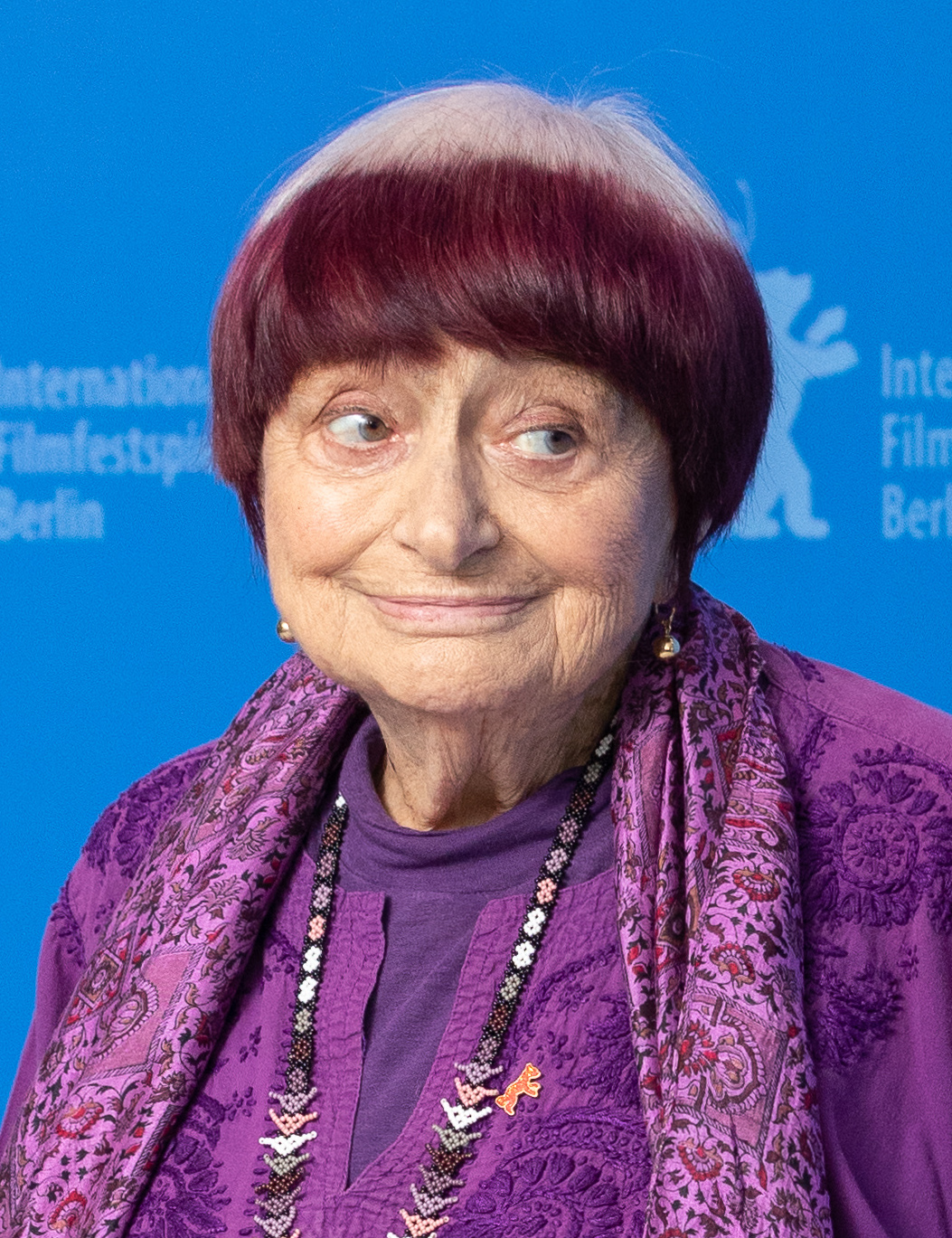
Agnès Varda, Best Documentary Feature co-winner

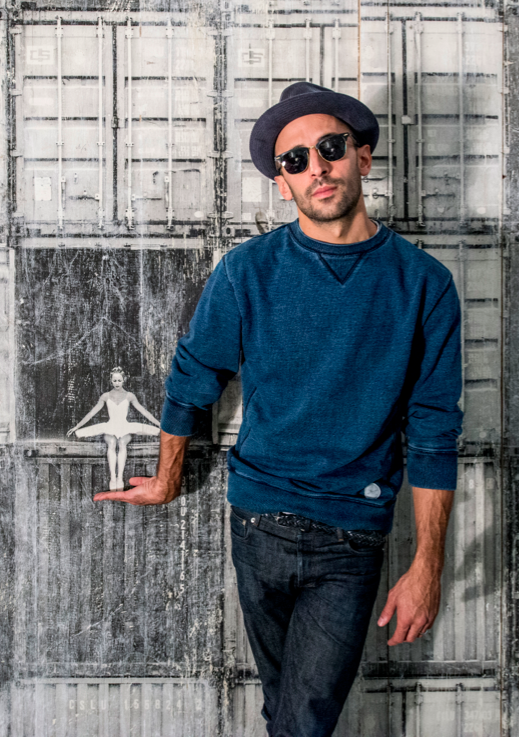
JR, Best Documentary Feature co-winner

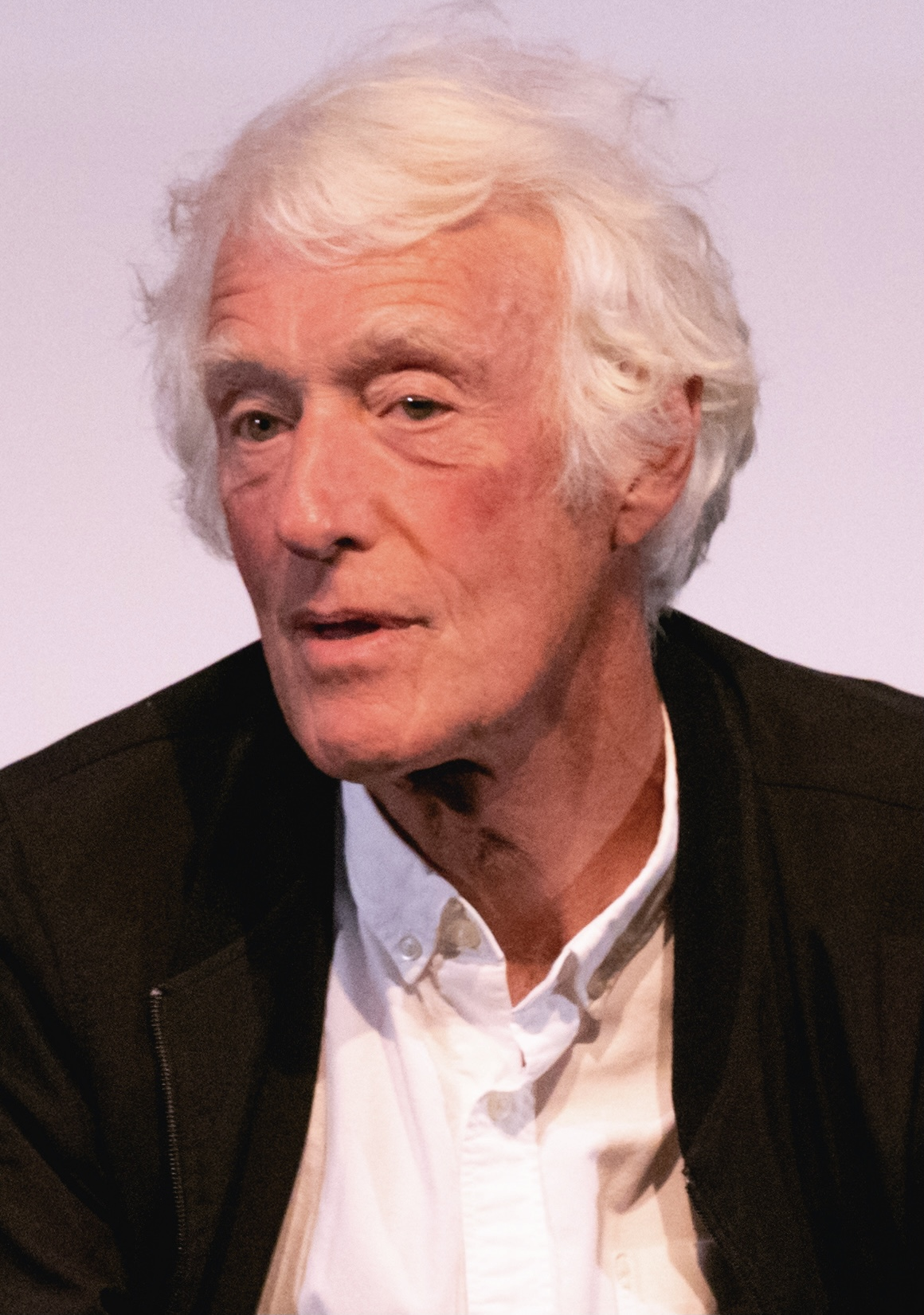
Roger Deakins, Best Cinematography winner

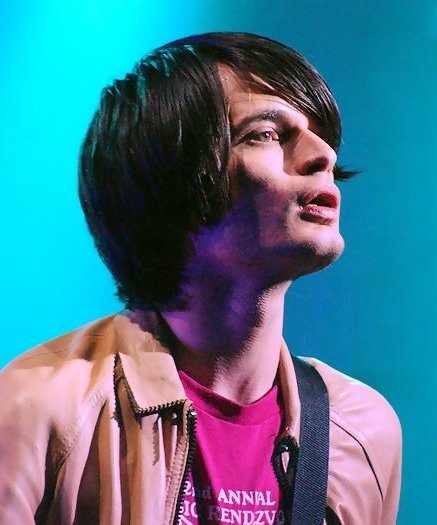
Jonny Greenwood, Best Original Score winner

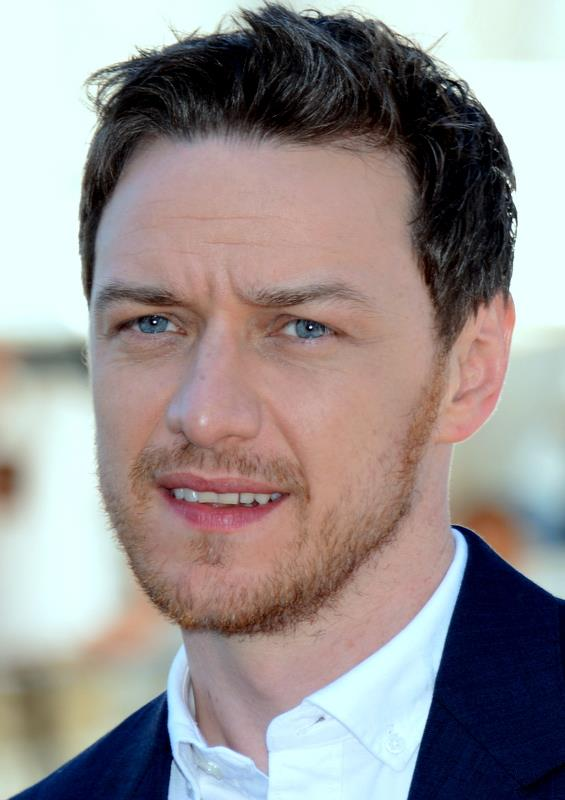
James McAvoy, Villain of the Year winner

Best Picture of the Year Get Out: Blade Runner 2049; The Disaster Artist; Dunkirk; The Florida Project; Lady Bird; Logan; Phantom Thread; The Post; Three Billboards Outside Ebbing, Missouri	Best Director Christopher Nolan – Dunkirk: Sean Baker – The Florida Project; Greta Gerwig – Lady Bird; Jordan Peele – Get Out; Denis Villeneuve – Blade Runner 2049
Best Actor in a Leading Role Daniel Day-Lewis – Phantom Thread as Reynolds Woodcock: James Franco – The Disaster Artist as Tommy Wiseau; Daniel Kaluuya – Get Out as Chris Washington; Gary Oldman – Darkest Hour as Winston Churchill; Robert Pattinson – Good Time as Constantine "Connie" Nikas	Best Actress in a Leading Role Saoirse Ronan – Lady Bird as Christine "Lady Bird" McPherson: Sally Hawkins – The Shape of Water as Elisa Esposito; Frances McDormand – Three Billboards Outside Ebbing, Missouri as Mildred Hayes; Margot Robbie – I, Tonya as Tonya Harding; Meryl Streep – The Post as Katharine Graham
Best Actor in a Supporting Role Willem Dafoe – The Florida Project as Bobby Hicks: Barry Keoghan – The Killing of a Sacred Deer as Martin Lang; Sam Rockwell – Three Billboards Outside Ebbing, Missouri as Jason Dixon; Michael Shannon – The Shape of Water as Richard Strickland; Patrick Stewart – Logan as Charles Xavier / Professor X	Best Actress in a Supporting Role Laurie Metcalf – Lady Bird as Marion McPherson: Tiffany Haddish – Girls Trip as Dina; Holly Hunter – The Big Sick as Beth Gardner; Allison Janney – I, Tonya as LaVona Golden; Lesley Manville – Phantom Thread as Cyril Woodcock
Best Ensemble Cast Get Out: Call Me by Your Name; Lady Bird; The Post; Three Billboards Outside Ebbing, Missouri	Best Screenplay Lady Bird – Greta Gerwig: The Big Sick – Emily V. Gordon and Kumail Nanjiani; The Disaster Artist – Scott Neustadter and Michael H. Weber; Get Out – Jordan Peele; Three Billboards Outside Ebbing, Missouri – Martin McDonagh
Best Animated Feature Coco – Lee Unkrich and Adrian Molina: The Breadwinner – Nora Twomey; The Lego Batman Movie – Chris McKay; Loving Vincent – Dorota Kobiela and Hugh Welchman; Your Name – Makoto Shinkai	Best Documentary Feature Faces Places – Agnès Varda and JR: City of Ghosts – Matthew Heineman; Ex Libris: The New York Public Library – Frederick Wiseman; LA 92 – Daniel Lindsay and T. J. Martin; Step – Amanda Lipitz
Best Foreign Language Film Raw – Julia Ducournau: Blade of the Immortal – Takashi Miike; BPM (Beats per Minute) – Robin Campillo; Frantz – François Ozon; Thelma – Joachim Trier	Best Cinematography Blade Runner 2049 – Roger Deakins: Columbus – Elisha Christian; Dunkirk – Hoyte van Hoytema; The Florida Project – Alexis Zabé; The Shape of Water – Dan Laustsen
Best Costume Design Phantom Thread – Mark Bridges: Beauty and the Beast – Jacqueline Durran; Blade Runner 2049 – Renée April; Darkest Hour – Jacqueline Durran; The Shape of Water – Luis Sequeira	Best Film Editing Dunkirk – Lee Smith: Baby Driver – Paul Machliss and Jonathan Amos; Blade Runner 2049 – Joe Walker; Get Out – Gregory Plotkin; Lady Bird – Nick Houy
Best Original Score Phantom Thread – Jonny Greenwood: Blade Runner 2049 – Benjamin Wallfisch and Hans Zimmer; Dunkirk – Hans Zimmer; War for the Planet of the Apes – Michael Giacchino; Wonderstruck – Carter Burwell	Best Production Design Blade Runner 2049 – Dennis Gassner (Production Design); Alessandra Querzola (Set Decoration): Dunkirk – Nathan Crowley (Production Design); Gary Fettis (Set Decoration); Murder on the Orient Express – Jim Clay (Production Design); Rebecca Alleway (Set Decoration); Phantom Thread – Mark Tildesley (Production Design); Véronique Melery (Set Decoration); The Shape of Water – Paul Denham Austerberry (Production Design); Shane Vieau and Jeff Melvin (Set Decoration)
Best Visual Effects War for the Planet of the Apes – Joe Letteri, Dan Lemmon, Daniel Barrett, and Joel Whist: Blade Runner 2049 – John Nelson, Paul Lambert, Richard R. Hoover, and Gerd Nefzer; Dunkirk – Andrew Jackson, Andrew Lockley, Scott R. Fisher, and Paul Corbould; The Shape of Water – Dennis Berardi, Luke Groves, Trey Harrell, and Kevin Scott; Valerian and the City of a Thousand Planets – Scott Stokdyk and Jérome Lionard	Best Youth Performance Brooklynn Prince – The Florida Project as Moonee: Dafne Keen – Logan as Laura Kinney / X-23; Sophia Lillis – It as Beverly Marsh; Millicent Simmonds – Wonderstruck as Rose; Jacob Tremblay – Wonder as August "Auggie" Pullman
Villain of the Year Dennis and various multiple personalities – Split (portrayed by James McAvoy): Philip Krauss – Detroit (portrayed by Will Poulter); Martin Lang – The Killing of a Sacred Deer (portrayed by Barry Keoghan); Pennywise – It (portrayed by Bill Skarsgård); Richard Strickland – The Shape of Water (portrayed by Michael Shannon)

Films that received multiple nominations
Nominations	Film
8	Blade Runner 2049
7	Dunkirk
7	Lady Bird
7	The Shape of Water
6	Get Out
6	Phantom Thread
5	The Florida Project
5	Three Billboards Outside Ebbing, Missouri
3	The Disaster Artist
3	Logan
3	The Post
2	The Big Sick
2	Darkest Hour
2	It
2	I, Tonya
2	The Killing of a Sacred Deer
2	War for the Planet of the Apes
2	Wonderstruck

Films that received multiple awards
Awards	Film
3	Lady Bird
3	Phantom Thread
2	Blade Runner 2049
2	Dunkirk
2	The Florida Project
2	Get Out
