= The Shape of Water (soundtrack) =

The Shape of Water (Original Motion Picture Soundtrack)

Soundtrack album by Alexandre Desplat
- Released: December 1, 2017
- Studios: Abbey Road Studios; Olliewood Mix Room (London); Studio De La Grande Armée (Paris)
- Genre: Soundtrack
- Length: 76:23
- Label: Decca
- Producer: Dominique Lemonnier

Alexandre Desplat chronology
Valerian and the City of a Thousand Planets (2017)	The Shape of Water (2017)	Suburbicon (2017)

The Shape of Water (Original Motion Picture Soundtrack) is the soundtrack album to the Academy Award-winning film of the same name. It featured 26 tracks — most of the tracks were from the original score composed by Alexandre Desplat and some tracks are incorporated songs, being originated from the 1940s and 1960s as the film is set during the Cold War period. The film, directed by Guillermo del Toro, who also co-wrote the script with Vanessa Taylor, stars Sally Hawkins, Michael Shannon, Richard Jenkins, Doug Jones, Michael Stuhlbarg, and Octavia Spencer.

Desplat initially intended to collaborate with del Toro for the stop-motion animated film Pinocchio, based on The Adventures of Pinocchio (1883) by Carlo Collodi in late-2012, which went on development hell months after. The following year (or by early-2014), del Toro narrated the film's premise to Desplat and was shown a preview of the finished film, which left Desplat impressed and finding similar to a musical, he agreed to score for the film. Desplat took six weeks to write the film's music, which was a "tender, warm and fragile" score like love. Desplat extensively captured the sound of water for the film, and used piano and flutes, to create the "blurred underwater sound". Desplat, who thought the film as a "masterpiece", complimenting del Toro's filmmaking, said that "when the movie's that beautiful, it makes your life much easier. You just have to put your hands on it and it takes you anywhere you want."

The album was released on December 1, 2017, by Decca Records in digital and physical formats, and was released on October 5, 2018, in vinyl. The score received critical acclaim praising Desplat's minimalistic approach and melodious underscore. Desplat won the Academy Award for Best Original Score for his work in the film, his second win after The Grand Budapest Hotel. He further won the BAFTA Award, Critics Choice Award and Golden Globe Award for "Best Original Score", in addition to receiving numerous awards and nominations, including nominations for three Grammy Awards and a Satellite Award for Best Original Score.

== Development ==
The Shape of Water marked the first collaboration between Desplat and del Toro. Both the director and composer, initially wanted to collaborate on the "darker adaptation" of the 1883 Italian novel The Adventures of Pinocchio by Carlo Collodi, being planned as a stop-motion animated film, with American musician Nick Cave confirming Desplat's inclusion in the project. But the film went into development hell in late-2012. (Note: The project was revived in 2022, with Desplat still being the composer of the film.) By late-2013 or early-2014, del Toro met Desplat to talk about the film's premise. In January 2017, Desplat was shown a rough cut of the finished film, and finding it similar to a musical, he agreed to compose a score. Desplat felt "shocked by the beauty of the film" and appreciated del Toro's direction, which he felt that "the most difficult thing, interweaving reality and imagination and bringing the audience into that world with no effort. It effortlessly takes you into his world, and that's very rare."

Desplat tried to capture the sound of water extensively to have audiences experience a "warm feeling" that is also caused by love. He also opined that "love has no color and no texture" and just "goes everywhere" comparing love to water. In an interview, he said the melody from the opening scene was "actually made of waves. I did not do that on purpose, but by being completely immersed in this love and these water elements, I wrote a melody that plays arpeggios like waves." The score was not composed chronologically, but "finding the opening was the key to find the entry to the film. What is the soul of the film? It's all there at the beginning. And actually it's the same thing we hear at the end. Because we're underwater, it's a dream, everything's floating in the room." Desplat said that "the music is already giving us audience a touch of what the story is, which is warm, a bit fragile, a bit melancholy but not too much". He took six weeks to write the film score.

The score was purposely composed to create the sense of immersion and to give the "sense that you, yourself, are floating". The two melodies, one titled "Elisa's Theme", are heard at the beginning of the film and later merge into a single piece of music by the end of it. To emphasize this effect and its final result, Desplat changed the sounds of the accompanying flutes, accordions, and whistles to "something blurred". For the accordions, he chose the bandoneon, played most frequently in South American music, rather than playing the accordions in a more French manner, as the "amphibian man" (or sea creature), originated from South America and is musically represented with "flourishes and scales like a tango master would do". Several instruments ranging from Fender piano, electric piano, and over 12 flutes, were played for the opening scene to create that "blurred underwater sound". He did not approach for a big orchestral score for a "tender" film and created the sounds with bass flutes, alto flutes, along with strings and accordions.

On composing the score overall, he said that it was "a matter of sculpting the music and making it take the shape of the storyline." As a result, Desplat opted out of giving Shannon's character a melody. He also avoided giving an underscore for the "amphibian man" as a monster from any horror film, as he felt that "he was not a monster" and have to "keep the organic nature of these characters."

== Reception ==
Professional ratings
Review scores
Source	Rating
AllMusic	link

The score for The Shape of Water was met with critical acclaim, with Rogerebert.com's calling it as "wistful and bittersweet". Ben Sachs of Chicago Reader called Desplat's score as "fanciful" and "maintains an ambience of wonderment". Calling it as a "sumptuous" and "creative fantasy of music", James Southall of Movie Wave wrote "The Shape of Water is so impressive but actually not even the most impressive score the composer wrote during 2017 is further testament to his quality." Filmtracks.com wrote "Desplat's music will delight his ardent enthusiasts with its intelligence, but others will remain unconvinced by his questionable choices when confronted by what they may perceive as oddly disconnected precision. The score will either melt your heart or make you scratch your head." Marcy Donelson of AllMusic praised the instrumentation and his efforts in creating the "sound of water", while also adding that "Whether intentional or by unconscious influence, one may hear references to film composers from the era of the story's setting as well, including [Henry] Mancini and [Bernard] Herrmann."

== Track listing ==
All tracks are written by Desplat, except where noted.

No.	Title	Artist(s)	Length
1.	"The Shape of Water"		3:42
2.	"You'll Never Know"	Renée Fleming	4:38
3.	"The Creature"		1:47
4.	"Elisa's Theme"		2:36
5.	"Fingers"		2:09
6.	"Spy Meeting"		1:42
7.	"Elisa and Zelda"		1:10
8.	"Five Stars General"		1:31
9.	"The Silence of Love"		1:35
10.	"Egg"		2:13
11.	"That Isn't Good"		1:43
12.	"Underwater Kiss"		2:12
13.	"The Escape"		10:57
14.	"Watching Ruth"		2:18
15.	"Decency"		2:23
16.	"He's Coming for You"		1:39
17.	"Overflow of Love"		2:56
18.	"Without You"		2:30
19.	"Rainy Day"		3:12
20.	"A Princess Without a Voice"		1:50
21.	"La Javanaise"	Madeleine Peyroux	4:10
22.	"I Know Why (And So Do You)"	Glenn Miller and His Orchestra	2:58
23.	"Chica Chica Boom Chic"	Carmen Miranda	2:19
24.	"Babalú"	Caterina Valente, Silvio Francesco	2:51
25.	"A Summer Place"	Andy Williams	2:34
26.	"You'll Never Know (Alternative Version)"	Renée Fleming	6:49
Total length:			76:23

=== For Your Consideration track list ===
As with all award seasons, a For Your Consideration album was released by Fox Searchlight Pictures in late-2017. This album consists of 33 tracks which are varied from the general release album, including the exclusion of songs, alternate cues of the original underscores and cues that are not featured in the original album.

1. The Shape Of Water
2. Elisa's Bath
3. Going To Work
4. Clock & Cleaning Pt. 1
5. The Creature
6. Blood Stains
7. Fingers
8. Corridor
9. Egg
10. Going Home
11. Spy Meeting
12. Clock & Cleaning Pt. 2
13. Torture
14. Bob Spots Elisa
15. Count These Stars
16. Now It's A He
17. The Escape
18. General Calls
19. Going To Strickland's Office
20. What Is She Saying?
21. Watching Ruth
22. A Lead
23. Cake Knife
24. No Bonanza For You
25. Overflow Of Love
26. The Rainy Day
27. Decency
28. That Isn't Good
29. They Clean
30. He's Coming For You
31. Without You
32. You're A God
33. Underwater Kiss

== Accolades ==
Award	Date of ceremony	Category	Recipient(s)	Result	Ref.
Academy Awards	March 4, 2018	Best Original Score	Alexandre Desplat	Won	
Austin Film Critics Association	January 8, 2018	Best Original Score	Alexandre Desplat	Won	
Boston Society of Film Critics	December 10, 2017	Best Use of Music in a Film	Alexandre Desplat	Runner-up	
British Academy Film Awards	February 18, 2018	Best Film Music	Alexandre Desplat	Won	
Chicago Film Critics Association	December 12, 2017	Best Original Score	Alexandre Desplat	Nominated	
Critics' Choice Movie Awards	January 11, 2018	Best Score	Alexandre Desplat	Won	
Dallas–Fort Worth Film Critics Association	December 13, 2017	Best Musical Score	Alexandre Desplat	Won	
Detroit Film Critics Society	December 7, 2017	Best Use of Music	The Shape of Water	Nominated	
Florida Film Critics Circle	December 23, 2017	Best Score	Alexandre Desplat	Nominated	
Georgia Film Critics Association	January 12, 2018	Best Original Score	Alexandre Desplat	Nominated	
Golden Globe Awards	January 7, 2018	Best Original Score	Alexandre Desplat	Won	
Grammy Awards	February 10, 2019	Best Score Soundtrack for Visual Media	Alexandre Desplat	Nominated	
Grammy Awards	February 10, 2019	Best Arrangement, Instrumental or A Capella	Alexandre Desplat – "The Shape of Water"	Nominated	
Grammy Awards	February 10, 2019	Best Instrumental Composition	Alexandre Desplat – "The Shape of Water"	Nominated	
Hollywood Music in Media Awards	November 16, 2017	Best Original Score – Fantasy/Horror/Sci-Fi Film	Alexandre Desplat	Won	
Houston Film Critics Society	January 6, 2018	Best Original Score	Alexandre Desplat	Won	
Los Angeles Film Critics Association	January 13, 2018	Best Music	Alexandre Desplat	Runner-up	
San Diego Film Critics Society	December 11, 2017	Best Original Score	Alexandre Desplat	Nominated	
San Francisco Film Critics Circle	December 10, 2017	Best Original Score	Alexandre Desplat	Nominated	
Satellite Awards	February 10, 2018	Best Original Score	Alexandre Desplat	Nominated	
Saturn Awards	June 27, 2018	Best Music	Alexandre Desplat	Nominated	
St. Louis Film Critics Association	December 17, 2017	Best Score	Alexandre Desplat	Nominated	
Venice Film Festival	September 9, 2017	Soundtrack Stars Award – Best Soundtrack	Alexandre Desplat	Won	
Washington D.C. Area Film Critics Association	December 8, 2017	Best Score	Alexandre Desplat	Nominated	
World Soundtrack Awards	October 17, 2018	Soundtrack Composer of the Year	Alexandre Desplat	Nominated	

== Release history ==
Region	Date	Format(s)	Catalog Number	Notes	Ref.
United States	December 1, 2017	CD	B0027674-02	—N/a	
United Kingdom	December 8, 2017	CD	6712461	—N/a	
United Kingdom	December 8, 2017	CD	00602567124610	Digipak	
United Kingdom	October 5, 2018	LP	0602567399476	—N/a	
United Kingdom	October 5, 2018	LP	0602567399476	Unofficial Release	
United Kingdom	October 5, 2018	LP	6739947	Test Pressing	
Poland	February 25, 2018	CD	6743548	—N/a	
Japan	March 7, 2018	CD	UCCL-1201	—N/a	

== Personnel ==
Credits adapted from AllMusic

Production

- Alexandre Desplat – composer, arranger
- Holly Adams – producer
- Dominique Lemonnier – producer
- Xavier Forcioli – executive producer, coordinator
- Rebecca Morellato – music production supervisor
- Joann Orgel – music coordinator

Management

- Gavin Bayliss – marketing
- Christine Bergren – music clearance
- Ellen Ginsburg – music clearance
- Tom Cavanaugh – music business affairs
- Danielle Diego – executive in charge of music
- David Hage – music preparation
- John Houlihan – music consultant
- Karyn Hughes – A&R
- Fiona Pope – A&R
- Trent Van Der Werf – design
- Lana Hunter – product manager

Instrumentation

- Frederic Gaillardet – piano
- Dave Arch – piano
- Jeff Boudreaux – drums
- Alexandre Desplat – flute, bass flute
- Paul Clarvis – percussion
- Riccardo del Fra – double bass
- Myriam Lafargue – accordion

Orchestration

- London Symphony Orchestra – orchestra
- Glenn Miller & His Orchestra – orchestra
- Alexandre Desplat – orchestrator, conductor, liner notes
- Dominique Lemonnier – conductor
- Glenn Miller – conductor
- Jean-Pascal Beintus – orchestrator
- Nicolas Charron – orchestrator
- Sylvain Morizet – orchestrator
- Carmine Lauri – orchestra leader
- Jake Parker – music preparation
- Areli Quirarte – music preparation
- Claude Romano – music preparation
- Norbert Vergonjanne – music preparation

Technical

- Romain Allender – music programming
- Jonathan Allen – sound engineer, mixing
- Peter Cobbin – sound engineer, mixing
- Ludovick Tartavel – technical assistance
- Kirsty Whalley – mixing
