= Miles Dale =

Miles Dale may refer to:

- J. Miles Dale (born 1961), Canadian film producer and director
- Miles Dale (character), a character from the American science fiction web television series For All Mankind
