= Brad Zoern =

Canadian sound engineer

- Born: June 19, 1970 (age 55); Windsor, Ontario, Canada
- Occupation: Sound engineer
- Years active: 1990 – present

Brad Zoern (born June 19, 1970) is a Canadian sound engineer. He is best known for his work in 2017 film The Shape of Water for which he was co-nominated with Christian Cooke and Glen Gauthier for Sound Mixing at 90th Academy Awards.
