= Glen Gauthier =

Canadian sound mixer

- Born: Glen Emile Gauthier
- Education: Prince of Wales Public School; Kenner Collegiate
- Occupation: Sound mixer
- Years active: 1978–present

Glen Emile Gauthier is a Canadian sound mixer. He is best known for his work on the film The Shape of Water (2017), for which he was nominated for an Academy Award and a British Academy Film Award. He has won two Gemini Awards and five Genie Awards.

Gauthier has his own sound company, called Noise Boys Inc., in Toronto, Ontario.

== Education ==
Gauthier attended Prince of Wales Public School and Kenner Collegiate while growing up in Peterborough, Ontario.

== Awards and nominations ==
Major awards

=== Academy Awards ===
Year	Category	Nominated work	Result	Ref.
2018	Best Sound Mixing	The Shape of Water	Nominated	

=== British Academy Film Awards ===
Year	Category	Nominated work	Result	Ref.
2018	Best Sound	The Shape of Water	Nominated	

=== Gemini Awards ===
Year	Category	Nominated work	Result	Ref.
2010	Best Sound in a Dramatic Series	Being Erica (Episode: "The Unkindest Cut")	Won	
2011	Best Sound in a Dramatic Series	Being Erica (Episode: "Bear Breasts")	Won	

=== Genie Awards ===
Year	Category	Nominated work	Result	Ref.
1982	Best Achievement in Overall Sound	Ticket to Heaven	Nominated	
1982	Best Achievement in Sound Editing	Ticket to Heaven	Nominated	
1983	Best Achievement in Sound Editing	Harry Tracy, Desperado	Nominated	
1984	Best Achievement in Overall Sound	The Terry Fox Story	Won	
1984	Best Achievement in Sound Editing	The Terry Fox Story	Won	
1986	Best Achievement in Overall Sound	One Magic Christmas	Won	
1986	Best Achievement in Sound Editing	One Magic Christmas	Won	
2000	Best Achievement in Overall Sound	Sunshine	Won	
2003	Best Achievement in Overall Sound	Spider	Nominated	
