= San Francisco Film Critics Circle Awards 2017 =

Annual US film awards ceremony

16th SFFCC Awards

December 10, 2017

Picture:
The Florida Project

Animated Feature:
Coco

Documentary:
Faces Places

Foreign Language Picture:
BPM (Beats per Minute)

The 16th San Francisco Film Critics Circle Awards, honoring the best in film for 2017, were given on December 10, 2017.

== Winners ==
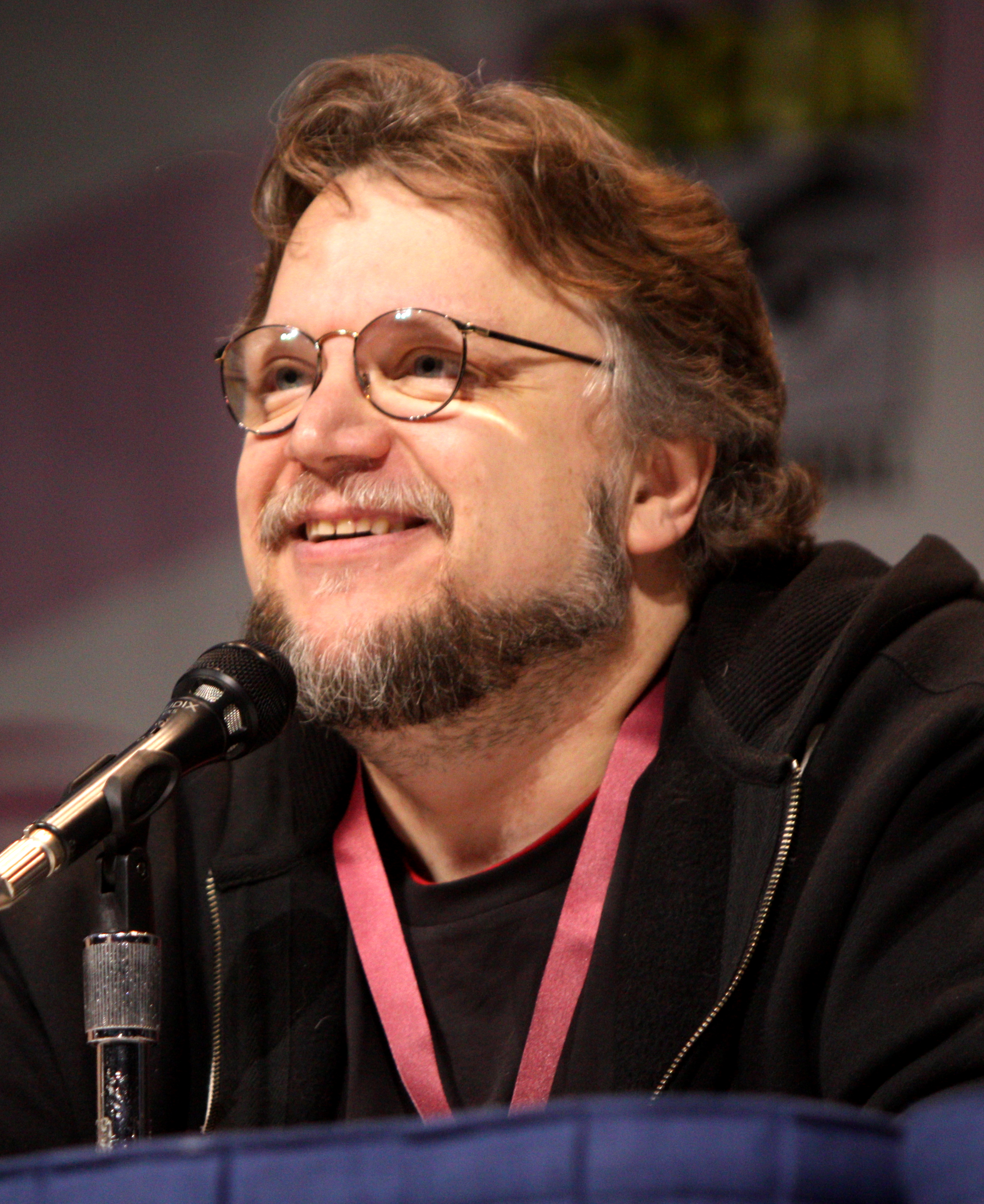
Guillermo del Toro, Best Director winner

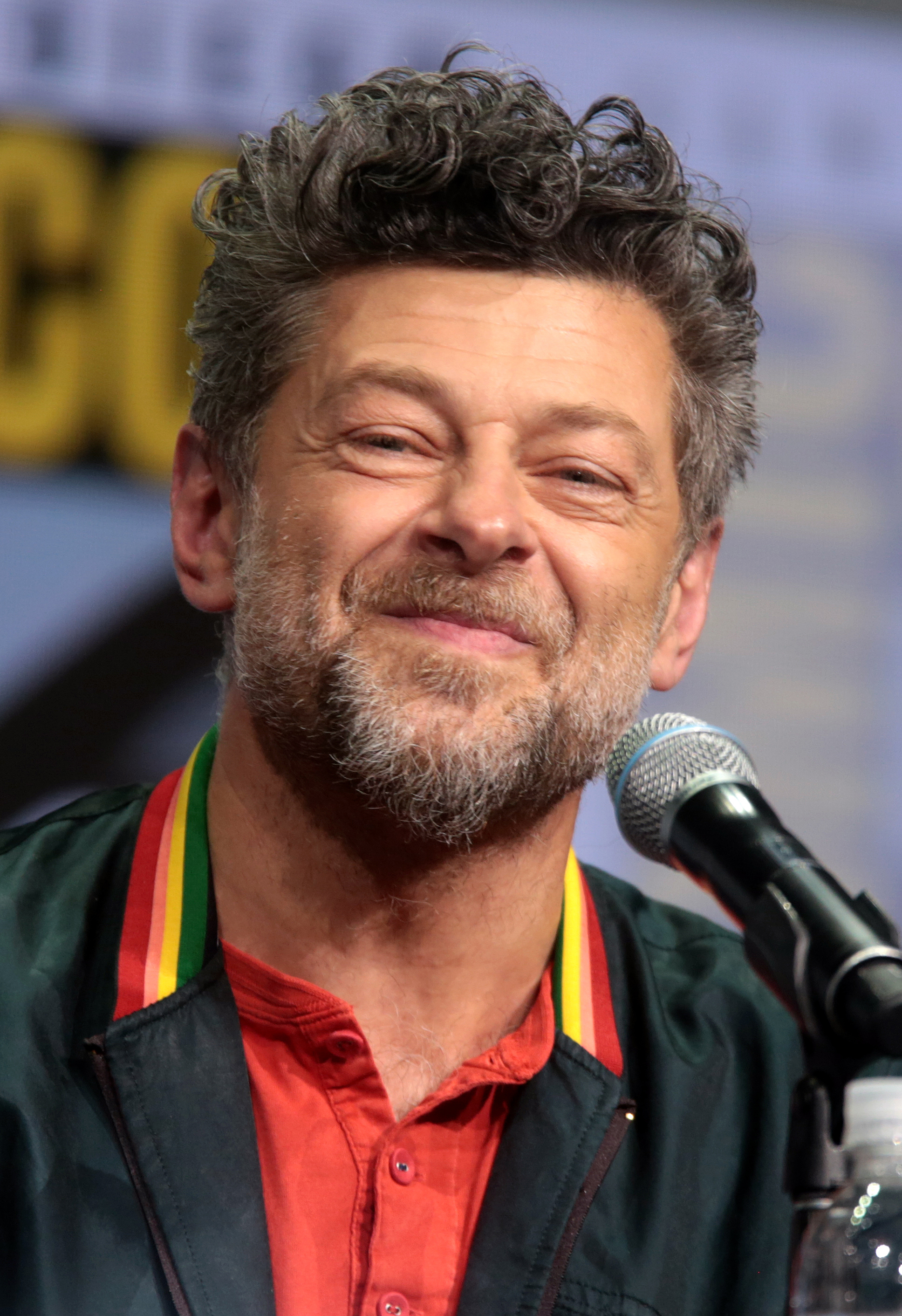
Andy Serkis, Best Actor winner

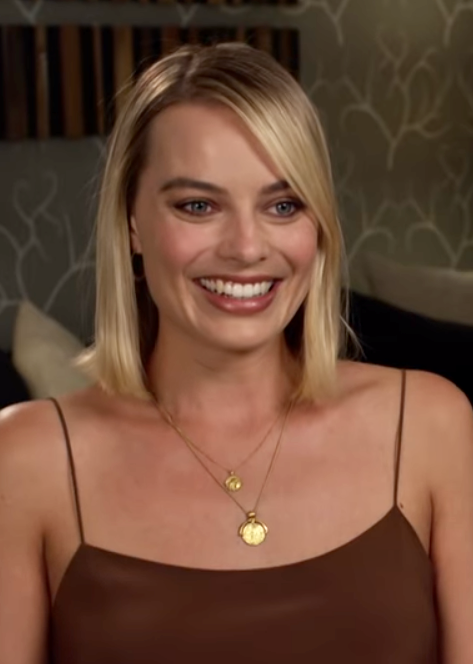
Margot Robbie, Best Actress winner

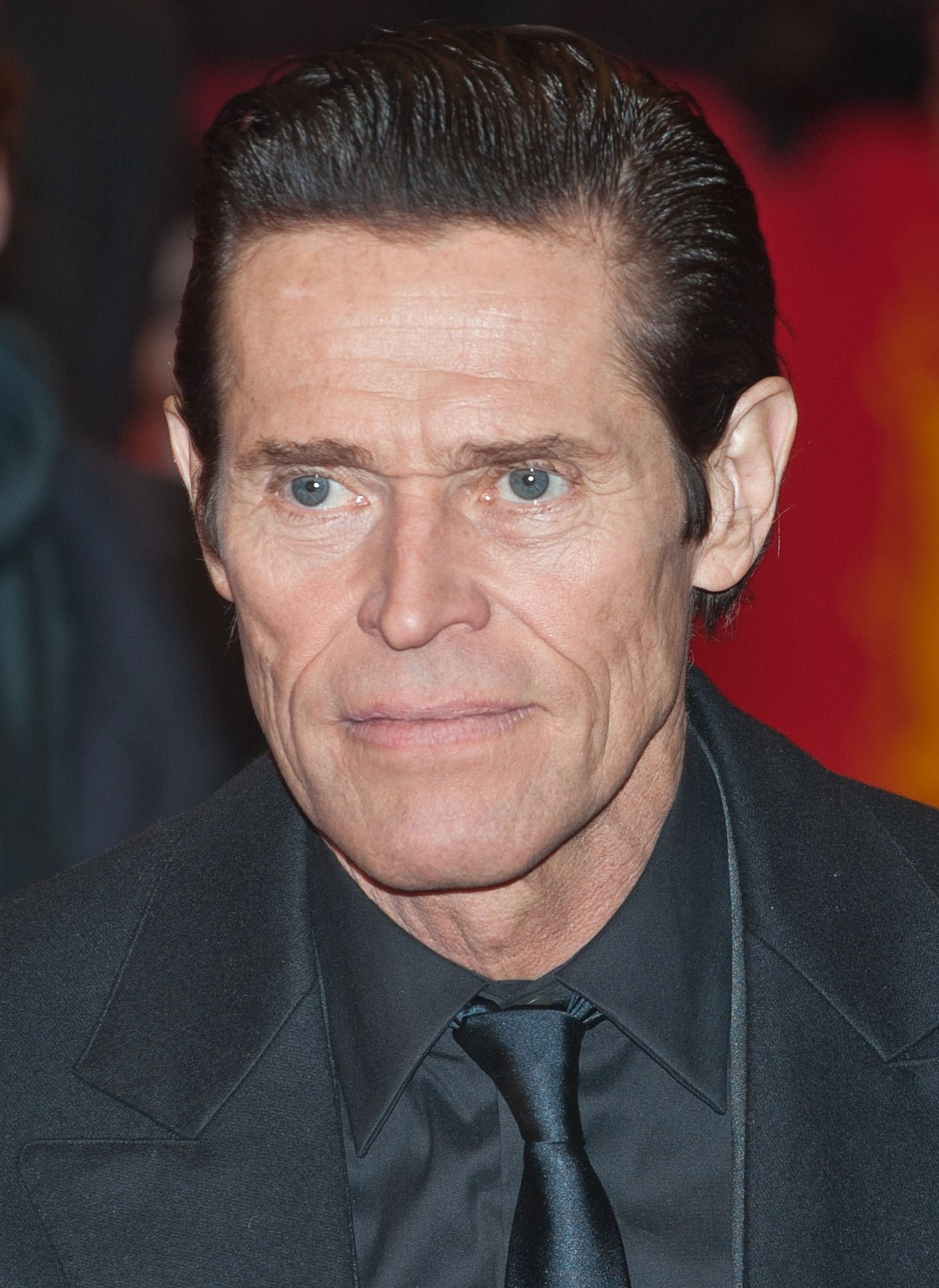
Willem Dafoe, Best Supporting Actor winner

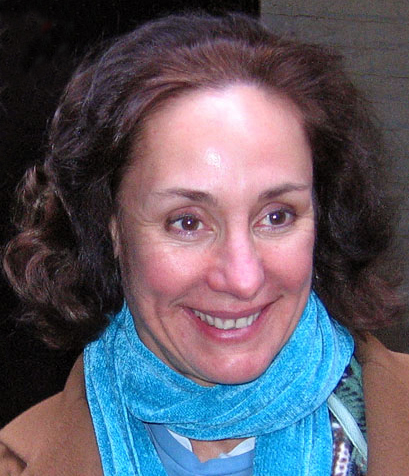
Laurie Metcalf, Best Supporting Actress winner

These are the nominees for the 16th SFFCC Awards. Winners are listed at the top of each list:

Best Film	Best Director
The Florida Project; Call Me by Your Name; Get Out; The Shape of Water; Three Billboards Outside Ebbing, Missouri	Guillermo del Toro – The Shape of Water; Sean Baker – The Florida Project; Greta Gerwig – Lady Bird; Christopher Nolan – Dunkirk; Jordan Peele – Get Out
Best Actor	Best Actress
Andy Serkis – War for the Planet of the Apes; Timothée Chalamet – Call Me by Your Name; James Franco – The Disaster Artist; Daniel Kaluuya – Get Out; Gary Oldman – Darkest Hour	Margot Robbie – I, Tonya; Annette Bening – Film Stars Don't Die in Liverpool; Sally Hawkins – The Shape of Water; Frances McDormand – Three Billboards Outside Ebbing, Missouri; Saoirse Ronan – Lady Bird
Best Supporting Actor	Best Supporting Actress
Willem Dafoe – The Florida Project; Armie Hammer – Call Me by Your Name; Richard Jenkins – The Shape of Water; Sam Rockwell – Three Billboards Outside Ebbing, Missouri; Michael Stuhlbarg – Call Me by Your Name	Laurie Metcalf – Lady Bird; Holly Hunter – The Big Sick; Allison Janney – I, Tonya; Melissa Leo – Novitiate; Lesley Manville – Phantom Thread
Best Screenplay – Adapted	Best Screenplay – Original
James Ivory – Call Me by Your Name; Scott Neustadter and Michael H. Weber – The Disaster Artist; Dee Rees and Virgil Williams – Mudbound; Brian Selznick – Wonderstruck; Aaron Sorkin – Molly's Game	Jordan Peele – Get Out; Guillermo del Toro and Vanessa Taylor – The Shape of Water; Greta Gerwig – Lady Bird; Emily V. Gordon and Kumail Nanjiani – The Big Sick; Martin McDonagh – Three Billboards Outside Ebbing, Missouri
Best Animated Feature	Best Documentary Film
Coco; The Breadwinner; The Lego Batman Movie; Loving Vincent; Your Name	Faces Places; Brimstone & Glory; City of Ghosts; Dawson City: Frozen Time; Jane
Best Foreign Language Film	Best Cinematography
BPM (Beats per Minute); A Fantastic Woman; Frantz; In the Fade; The Square	Roger Deakins – Blade Runner 2049; Dan Laustsen – The Shape of Water; Vittorio Storaro – Wonder Wheel; Hoyte van Hoytema – Dunkirk; Alexis Zabe – The Florida Project
Best Editing	Best Original Score
Paul Machliss and Jonathan Amos – Baby Driver; Michael Kahn – The Post; Lee Smith – Dunkirk; Joe Walker – Blade Runner 2049; Sidney Wolinsky – The Shape of Water	Jonny Greenwood – Phantom Thread; Alexandre Desplat – The Shape of Water; Michael Giacchino – War for the Planet of the Apes; Benjamin Wallfisch and Hans Zimmer – Blade Runner 2049; Hans Zimmer – Dunkirk
Best Production Design	
Paul Denham Austerberry – The Shape of Water; Nathan Crowley – Dunkirk; Mark Friedberg – Wonderstruck; Dennis Gassner – Blade Runner 2049; Mark Tildesley – Phantom Thread	

== Special awards ==
=== Special Citation Award for under-appreciated independent cinema ===
- Brimstone & Glory
  - Columbus
  - The Other Kids

=== Marlon Riggs Award for courage & vision in the Bay Area film community ===
- Peter Bratt
