= Jeff Melvin =

Canadian set decorator

Jeffrey A. Melvin
- Occupations: Production designer, set decorator
- Years active: 1992–present

Jeff A. Melvin is a Canadian set decorator. He is best known for his work on the 2017 film, The Shape of Water, for which he won the Academy Award for Best Production Design with production designer Paul Denham Austerberry and set decorator Shane Vieau. The trio also won the BAFTA award for Production Design on February 18.
