= Prince of Wales Public School (Peterborough, Ontario) =

Elementary school in Peterborough, Ontario

Location
- 1211 Monaghan Road South; Peterborough, Ontario, K9J 5L4; Canada; 44.297°N 78.33518°W

Information
- Motto: "Go For Your Gold!"
- Founded: 1914
- School board: Kawartha Pine Ridge District School Board
- Superintendent: Peter Mangold
- Area trustee: Rose Kitney, Roy Wilfong
- School number: 454818
- Principal: Dee Gannon
- Grades: JK-8
- Enrollment: 450
- Language: English, French Immersion, ESL
- Mascot: Wildcats
- Website: princeofwales.kprdsb.ca
- Last updated: 10 January 2008

Prince of Wales Public School, established in 1919, is located on Monaghan Road in Peterborough, Ontario. It is a member of the Kawartha Pine Ridge District School Board. It has approximately 650 students in full attendance, ranging from JK to Grade 8. Prince of Wales offers French immersion to students in grades sk-8.

== Community Hub ==
The school has been designated a Community Hub by the Peterborough Poverty Reduction Network. The boundaries of the new hub are: Aylmer St. to Goodfellow Road; and Charlotte Street to Lansdowne Street. The hub serves to unify the community through a variety of family activities.

== See also ==
- Monarchy in Ontario
- Royal eponyms in Canada
