= Luis Sequeira =

Canadian costume designer

Luis Sequeira is a Canadian costume designer of Portuguese descent. He is best known for his frequent collaborations with Mexican director Guillermo del Toro and has been nominated two times for an Academy Award for Best Costume Design on two of his films: The Shape of Water (2017) and Nightmare Alley (2021).

== Filmography ==
- Nightmare Alley
- Monster Problems
- It – Chapter Two
- The Christmas Chronicles
- The Shape of Water
- The Strain
- The Thing
- F/X: The Series
- Thomas and the Magic Railroad
- Code Name: Eternity
- Highwaymen
- Flash of Genius
- Being Erica
- Mama

== Awards and nominations ==
- Academy Award for Best Costume Design
- BAFTA Award for Best Costume Design
- Critics' Choice Movie Award for Best Costume Design
- Costume Designers Guild Award for Excellence in Period Film
- CAFTCAD Award - Excellence in for period film - Shape of Water
- CAFTCAD Award - Excellence in period film - Nightmare Alley
- CAFTCAD Award - Excellence in period TV - Guillermo del Toro's Cabinet of Curiosities
- CAFTCAD Award - Excellence in contemporary TV - Guillermo del Toro's Cabinet of Curiosities
