= Shane Vieau =

Canadian set decorator

Shane Pedro Vieau
- Occupations: Production designer, set decorator
- Years active: 1999-present

Shane Vieau is a Canadian set decorator. He has won two Academy Awards for Best Production Design (set). The first for his work on the 2017 film, The Shape of Water, shared with production designer, Paul Denham Austerberry and set decorator Jeff Melvin. The second for Frankenstein (2025), which was shared with the production designer Tamara Deverell.

Vieau and Deverell were also nominated at the 94th Academy Awards for the film Nightmare Alley. He was nominated with Patrice Vermette at the 97th Academy Awards for the film Dune: Part Two.
