= Nathan Robitaille =

Canadian sound editor

- Born: Canada
- Education: Fanshawe College
- Occupation: Sound editor
- Years active: 1997–present

Nathan Robitaille is a Canadian sound editor. He is best known for his work on the film The Shape of Water (2017), for which he was nominated for an Academy Award and a British Academy Film Award.

== Education ==
In 2000, Robitaille graduated from Fanshawe College, where he studied Music Industry Arts and Audio Post Production programs.

== Awards and nominations ==
Major awards

=== Academy Awards ===
| Year | Category | Nominated work | Result | Ref. |
|---|---|---|---|---|
| 2018 | Best Sound Editing | The Shape of Water | Nominated | |

=== British Academy Film Awards ===
| Year | Category | Nominated work | Result | Ref. |
|---|---|---|---|---|
| 2018 | Best Sound | The Shape of Water | Nominated | |

=== Canadian Screen Awards ===
| Year | Category | Nominated work | Result | Ref. |
|---|---|---|---|---|
| 2014 | Best Sound Editing | The Mortal Instruments: City of Bones | Won | |
| 2016 | Best Sound in a Fiction Program or Series | X Company (Episode: "Pilot") | Nominated | |
| 2017 | Best Sound in a Fiction Program or Series | X Company (Episode: "Butcher and Bolt") | Nominated | |
| 2018 | Best Sound in a Fiction Program or Series | X Company (Episode: "The Hunt") | Nominated | |

=== Genie Awards ===
| Year | Category | Nominated work | Result | Ref. |
|---|---|---|---|---|
| 2005 | Best Achievement in Sound Editing | Resident Evil: Apocalypse | Won | |
| 2009 | Best Achievement in Sound Editing | This Beautiful City | Nominated | |

=== Primetime Emmy Awards ===
| Year | Category | Nominated work | Result | Ref. |
|---|---|---|---|---|
| 2012 | Outstanding Sound Editing for a Limited Series, Movie, or Special | Hatfields & McCoys | Nominated | |
