= J. Miles Dale =

Canadian director and producer

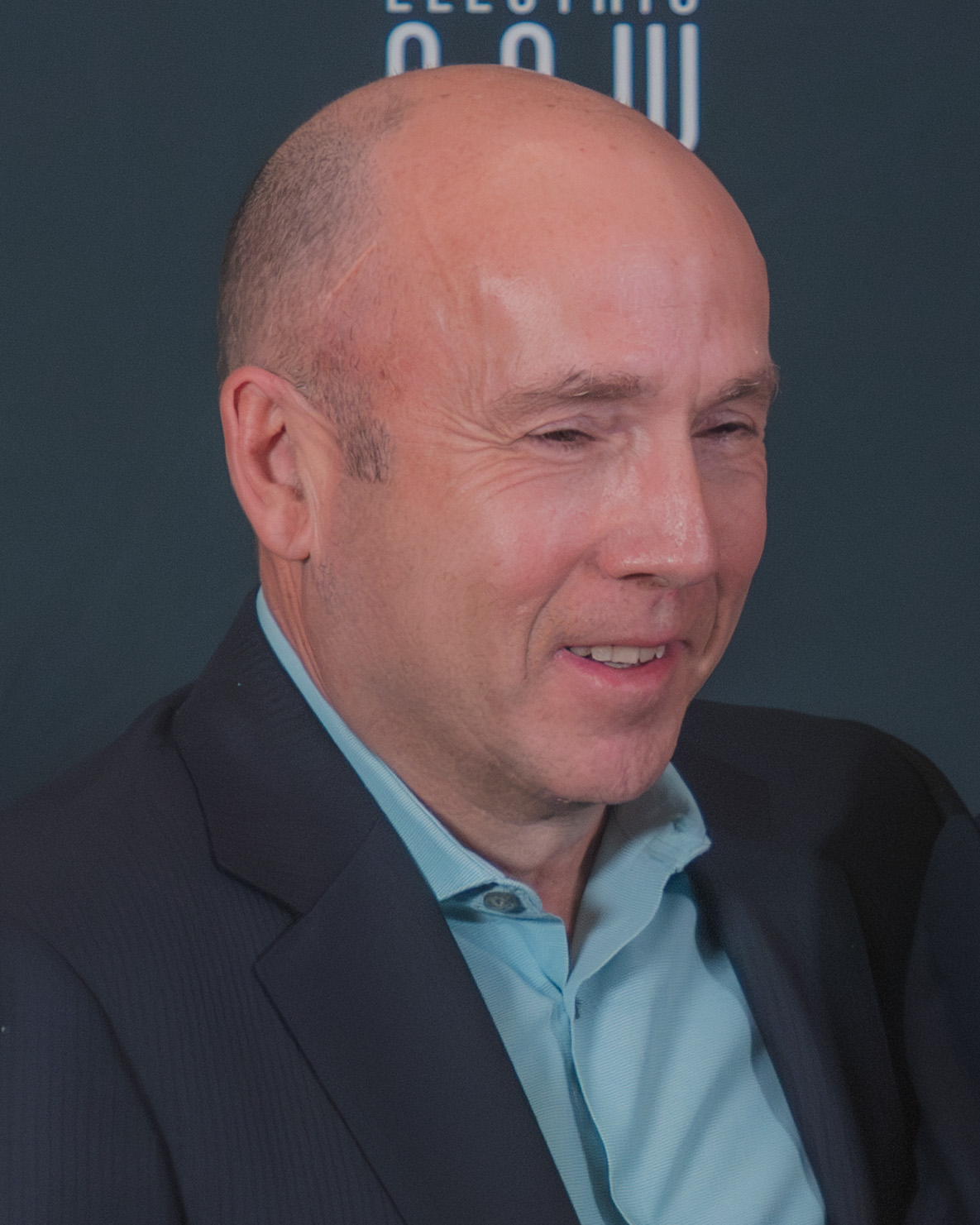
- Dale in 2026
- Born: 1961 (age 64–65); Toronto, Ontario, Canada
- Occupations: Producer, director
- Years active: 1985–present
- Known for: Producer of The Shape of Water
- Parent: Jimmy Dale (father) Irene Dale (mother)
- Awards: Academy Award for Best Picture; The Shape of Water (2017)

J. Miles Dale (born 1961) is a Canadian producer and director of film and television. He is best known for producing the critically acclaimed film The Shape of Water, which won the Academy Award for Best Picture at the 90th Academy Awards ceremony. Dale is a regular collaborator of fellow director Guillermo del Toro and formed a creative partnership with Netflix.

== Early life ==
Dale was born in Toronto, Ontario, to British-born Canadian jazz musician Jimmy Dale. Dale attended Bayview Glen School from 1965 to 1968. In 1968, his father moved the family to Hollywood where he worked as a music director for The Smothers Brothers Show, The Andy Williams Show and The Sonny & Cher Comedy Hour. The family returned to Toronto in the mid-1970s, and Miles graduated from Jarvis Collegiate Institute. He attended the University of Toronto for a year and later transferred to the University of British Columbia before dropping out to join the film industry.

== Filmography ==
=== Film ===
Producer

- Harvard Man (2001)
- The Skulls II (2002)
- Blizzard (2003)
- The Skulls III (2004) (Also director)
- Harold & Kumar Go to White Castle (2004)
- Mama (2013)
- The Shape of Water (2017)
- Scary Stories to Tell in the Dark (2019)
- Antlers (2021)
- Nightmare Alley (2021)
- Frankenstein (2025)
- The Boy in the Iron Box (TBA)

2nd unit director

- Wolf Girl (2001) (TV movie)
- Hollywoodland (2006)
- Talk to Me (2007)
- Flash of Genius (2008)
- Love Happens (2009)
- The Thing (2011)

Executive producer

- Hollywoodland (2006)
- Talk to Me (2007)
- Pontypool (2008)
- Flash of Genius (2008)
- Love Happens (2009)
- Scott Pilgrim vs. the World (2010)
- The Thing (2011)
- The Vow (2012)
- Carrie (2013)
- Endless Love (2014)

Unit production manager

- Hollywoodland (2006)
- Flash of Genius (2008)
- Scott Pilgrim vs. the World (2010)
- The Thing (2011)
- Nightmare Alley (2021)

=== Television ===
Year	Title	Producer	Director	Notes
1985	Comedy Factory	Yes	No	
1986	True Confessions	Yes	No	
1987–90	Friday the 13th: The Series	Yes	No	
1990	Top Cops	Yes	Yes	1 episode
1994	RoboCop: The Series	Yes	Yes	Episode "Midnight Minus One"
1996–98	F/X: The Series	Co-executive	No	
2000	Earth: Final Conflict	No	Yes	Episode "Scorched Earth"
2001–04	Doc	No	Yes	5 episodes
2002–03	Andromeda	No	Yes	Episodes "Dance of the Mayflies" and "The Unconquerable Man"
2002–04	Sue Thomas: F.B.Eye	No	Yes	4 episodes
2007	'Til Death Do Us Part	No	Yes	2 episodes
2016	Shadowhunters: The Mortal Instruments	Executive	Yes	Directed 3 episodes
2014–17	The Strain	Executive	Yes	Directed 7 episodes; Also unit production manager and 2nd unit director
2021	Sex/Life	Executive	No	
2022	Guillermo del Toro's Cabinet of Curiosities	Executive	No	

(citation: https://www.imdb.com/name/nm0197703/?ref_=fn_al_nm_1)

== Awards and nominations ==
Year	Award	Category	Work	Result
2017	Awards Circuit Community Awards	Best Motion Picture	The Shape of Water	Nominated
2018	Producers Guild of America	Best Theatrical Motion Picture	The Shape of Water	Won
2018	Gold Derby	Best Motion Picture	The Shape of Water	Nominated
2018	Online Film & Television Association	Best Picture	The Shape of Water	Nominated
2018	Academy of Motion Picture Arts and Sciences	Best Picture	The Shape of Water	Won
2018	British Academy of Film and Television Arts	Best Film	The Shape of Water	Nominated
2018	Irish Film & Television Academy	Best International Film	The Shape of Water	Nominated
2022	Academy of Motion Picture Arts and Sciences	Best Picture	Nightmare Alley	Nominated
2026	Academy of Motion Picture Arts and Sciences	Best Picture	Frankenstein	Nominated
