= Paul Denham Austerberry =

Canadian production designer

Paul Austerberry
- Born: 1966 (age 59–60); Toronto, Canada
- Education: Carleton University (BArch)
- Occupation: Film production designer
- Years active: 1992-present
- Organization: Directors Guild of Ontario
- Known for: The Twilight Saga: Eclipse (2010); The Shape of Water (2017); The Color Purple (2023)
- Awards: Academy Award for Best Production Design, The Shape of Water (2018)

Paul Austerberry (born 1966) is a Canadian film and television production designer. For his set design in the 2017 film The Shape of Water he won an Academy Award and a BAFTA Award for Best Production Design with set decorators Shane Vieau and Jeff Melvin. In the 2013 film Pompeii, he won the Canadian Screen Award for Best Art Direction/Production Design at the 3rd Canadian Screen Awards in 2015 with Nigel Churcher.

== Early life ==
Paul Austerberry was born in 1966 to parents Peter and Deanna Austerberry. Though the City of Toronto is his birthplace, Northern Ontario's Sault Ste. Marie waterfront city is the place where Paul Austerberry, an only child, was raised by his British-born father and Filipina mother.

== Filmography ==
Films Austerberry has worked on include:

=== Art Director ===
- Extreme Measures (1996)
- Kids in the Hall: Brain Candy (1996)
- Harriet the Spy (1996)
- The Real Blonde (1997)
- Half Baked (1998)
- The Mighty (1998)
- The Corruptor (1999)
- X-Men (2000)

=== Production Designer ===
- Six Gestures (1997)
- Mercy (2000)
- Exit Wounds (2001)
- Men With Brooms (2002)
- The Tuxedo (2002)
- Resident Evil: Apocalypse (2004)
- Highwaymen (2004)
- Assault on Precinct 13 (2005)
- Take the Lead (2006)
- 30 Days of Night (2007)
- Death Race (2008)
- The Twilight Saga: Eclipse (2010)
- The Three Musketeers (2011)
- Deadfall (2012)
- Pompeii (2014)
- Len and Company (2015)
- Shut In (2016)
- The Shape of Water (2017)
- It Chapter Two (2019)
- The Flash (2023)
- The Color Purple (2023)

== Awards and nominations ==
Works of Honorary Recognition
Year	Title	Award	Role
2017	The Shape of Water	Academy Award for Best Production Design	Production Designer
