= The Shape of Water =

2017 film by Guillermo del Toro

- Theatrical release poster
- Directed by: Guillermo del Toro
- Screenplay by: Guillermo del Toro; Vanessa Taylor
- Story by: Guillermo del Toro
- Produced by: Guillermo del Toro; J. Miles Dale
- Starring: Sally Hawkins; Michael Shannon; Richard Jenkins; Doug Jones; Michael Stuhlbarg; Octavia Spencer
- Cinematography: Dan Laustsen
- Edited by: Sidney Wolinsky
- Music by: Alexandre Desplat
- Production companies: Fox Searchlight Pictures; Double Dare You Productions
- Distributed by: Fox Searchlight Pictures
- Release dates: August 31, 2017 (Venice); December 1, 2017 (United States)
- Running time: 123 minutes
- Countries: United States; Canada; Mexico
- Languages: American Sign Language; English
- Budget: $19.3–19.5 million
- Box office: $195.2 million

The Shape of Water is a 2017 dark fantasy film directed and produced by Guillermo del Toro, who co-wrote the screenplay with Vanessa Taylor. It stars Sally Hawkins, Michael Shannon, Richard Jenkins, Doug Jones, Michael Stuhlbarg, and Octavia Spencer. Set in 1962 Baltimore, Maryland, and inspired by Creature from the Black Lagoon, the film follows a mute cleaner at a high-security government laboratory who falls in love with a captured humanoid amphibian creature and decides to help him escape from death at the hands of an evil colonel. Filming took place on location in Ontario, Canada, from August to November 2016.

The Shape of Water was screened as part of the main competition in the 74th Venice International Film Festival, where it premiered on August 31, 2017, and was awarded the Golden Lion. It was also screened at the 2017 Toronto International Film Festival. It began a limited release in two theaters in New York City on December 1, 2017, before expanding wide on December 22, and grossed $195 million worldwide.

The Shape of Water was widely acclaimed by critics, who lauded its acting, screenplay, direction, visuals, production design, cinematography, and musical score. The American Film Institute selected it as one of the top ten films of 2017. The film was nominated for a leading thirteen awards at the 90th Academy Awards, winning four, including Best Picture and Best Director, and received numerous other accolades; it was the second fantasy film to win Best Picture, after The Lord of the Rings: The Return of the King (2003). A novelization by del Toro and Daniel Kraus was published on March 6, 2018.

== Plot ==
In 1962, during the Cold War, Elisa Esposito works as a janitor in a secret government laboratory in Baltimore, Maryland. Found abandoned by the side of a river as an infant with scars on her neck, Elisa is mute and communicates through sign language. Her only friends are her closeted middle-aged neighbor Giles, an advertising illustrator, and her coworker Zelda.

Colonel Richard Strickland has captured a creature from a South American river and taken it to the facility for study, losing two fingers (which are unsuccessfully retransplanted) while interrogating it. Elisa discovers it is a humanoid amphibian, and bonds with the creature after visiting him in secret. Seeking an advantage in the Space Race, Strickland persuades General Frank Hoyt to vivisect the Amphibian Man to examine his respiratory system. Scientist Robert Hoffstetler, a Soviet spy, pleads with Strickland to keep him alive for further study, while being ordered by his handlers to kill the creature.

Giles reluctantly agrees to help Elisa free Amphibian Man after failing a work assignment and being rejected by a local restaurant manager whom he discovered was both racist and homophobic. Hoffstetler and Zelda also become involved in the plot and successfully get the Amphibian Man to Elisa's apartment. Elisa keeps him in her bathtub, planning to release him into a nearby canal when heavy rain allows access to the ocean. When Giles tries to stop the Amphibian Man from devouring one of his cats, his arm is slashed and the Amphibian Man flees. Elisa coaxes him back to her apartment and the creature touches Giles on his balding head and wounded arm. The next morning, Giles discovers his hair is regrowing and the wounds on his arm have healed. Elisa's infatuation with the Amphibian Man culminates in sexual intercourse.

General Hoyt gives Strickland an ultimatum to recover the Amphibian Man or his career will be over. Hoffstetler is told by his handlers he'll be extracted from the US in two days. The Amphibian Man's health begins to deteriorate.

Strickland follows Hoffstetler to a meeting with his handlers where Hoffstetler is shot. Strickland intervenes, shooting the handlers, then tortures the dying spy into revealing the Amphibian Man's whereabouts. Strickland confronts Zelda in her home and her husband reveals Elisa has the Amphibian Man. Zelda warns Elisa to release the creature before Strickland can arrive. He ransacks Elisa's apartment and finds evidence of the creature in the bathtub and a calendar note revealing where she plans to release him.

"Unable to perceive the shape of You. I find You all around me. Your presence fills my eyes with Your love. It humbles my heart. For You are everywhere."

— In a voice-over narration, Giles conveys his belief that Elisa lived happily ever after with the Amphibian Man.

Elisa and Giles are bidding farewell to the creature at the canal when Strickland arrives, knocks Giles down, and shoots both the Amphibian Man and Elisa. Giles and Strickland fight while the Amphibian Man heals himself, then fatally slashes Strickland's throat. As the police arrive with Zelda, the Amphibian Man jumps into the canal with the unconscious Elisa and kisses her. When he uses his healing power again, the scars on her neck open to reveal gills. The now-amphibious Elisa revives and embraces him.

== Cast ==
- Sally Hawkins as Elisa Esposito
- Michael Shannon as Richard Strickland
- Richard Jenkins as Giles
- Doug Jones as "The Amphibian Man"
- Michael Stuhlbarg as Robert Hoffstetler / Dimitri Mosenkov
- Octavia Spencer as Zelda Delilah Fuller
- Nick Searcy as General of the Air Force Frank Hoyt
- David Hewlett as Fleming
- Nigel Bennett as Mihalkov
- Stewart Arnott as Bernard
- Lauren Lee Smith as Elaine Strickland
- Martin Roach as Brewster Fuller
- John Kapelos as Mr. Arzoumanian
- Morgan Kelly as Pie Guy
- Wendy Lyon as Sally
- Allegra Fulton as Yolanda

== Production ==
=== Development ===
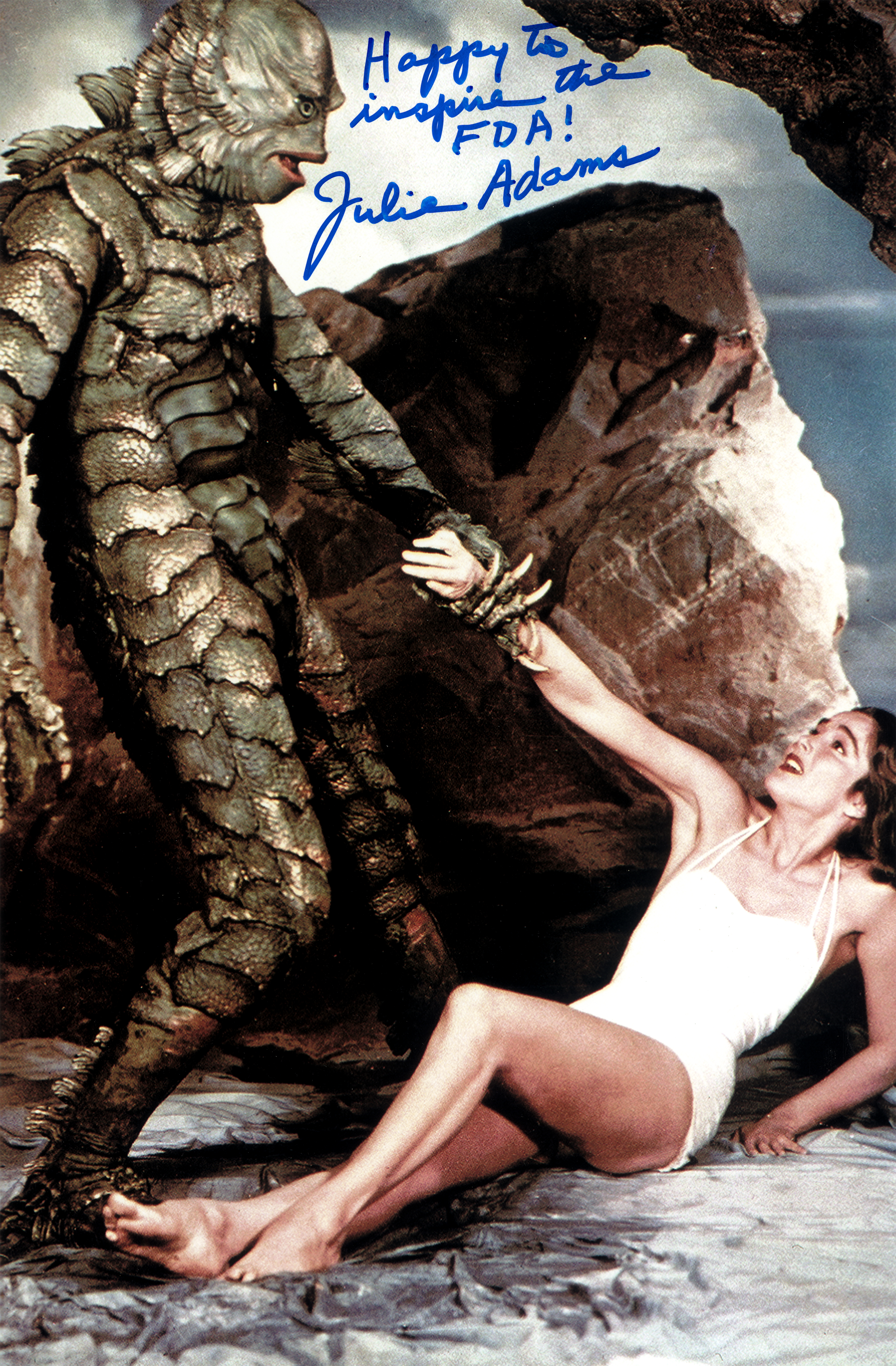
The Gill-man and Kay Lawrence from Creature from the Black Lagoon inspired del Toro's concept.

It was co-produced between the United States and Mexico. The film was directed by Guillermo del Toro from a screenplay he co-wrote with Vanessa Taylor. Del Toro formed the idea for The Shape of Water over breakfast in December 2011 with Daniel Kraus, his future collaborator on the novel Trollhunters. It was primarily inspired by del Toro's childhood memories of seeing Creature from the Black Lagoon (1954) and wanting to see the Gill-man and Kay Lawrence (played by Julie Adams) succeed in their romance.

When del Toro was in talks with Universal to direct a remake of Creature from the Black Lagoon, he tried pitching a version focused more on the creature's perspective, where the Creature ended up together with the female lead, but the studio executives rejected the concept.

In placing the film in the 1960s, del Toro said "the movie is a movie about our problems today and about demonizing the other and about fearing or hating the other, and how that is a much more destructive position than learning to love and understand [...] if I say once upon a time in 1962, it becomes a fairy tale for troubled times. People can lower their guard a little bit more and listen to the story and listen to the characters and talk about the issues, rather than the circumstances of the issues."

=== Casting ===
A fan of her performances in Fingersmith (2005) and Happy-Go-Lucky (2008), del Toro wrote the script with Sally Hawkins in mind for the female lead and pitched the idea to her while he was intoxicated at the 2014 Golden Globes. Hawkins prepared for the role by watching films of silent comedians Charlie Chaplin, Buster Keaton, Harold Lloyd, and Stan Laurel from Laurel and Hardy, the last of whom del Toro told her to watch because he thought Laurel could "do a state of grace without conveying it verbally".

Doug Jones was chosen to portray the Amphibian Man in The Shape of Water, having collaborated with del Toro on Mimic (1997), Hellboy (2004), Pan's Labyrinth (2006), Hellboy II: The Golden Army (2008), and Crimson Peak (2015), with Jones also playing a different amphibian man in the Hellboy series. In an interview with NPR, Jones said his initial reaction to learning the creature would also be a romantic lead was "utter terror" but trusted the director to expand the character's development. As Jones wanted to portray a creature distinct from others in monster films, he practiced a variety of movements in a dance studio. After del Toro told him to make the character "animalistic, but royal and regal", Jones decided to also portray the character as a Matador. The voice of the Amphibian Man was created by supervising sound editor Nathan Robitaille, who combined his own vocalizations, various animal sounds, and recordings of del Toro breathing.

The part of Giles was originally written with Ian McKellen in mind, and del Toro was inspired to do so by his performance in Gods and Monsters (1998) as the real-life closeted gay filmmaker James Whale, the director of Frankenstein (1931), The Invisible Man (1933), and Bride of Frankenstein (1935), who found himself unemployable in his later years. When McKellen proved unavailable, del Toro sent an e-mail to Richard Jenkins, who accepted the part.

Michael Shannon was cast as Richard Strickland, the villain of the film. Shannon and del Toro had early conversations about the notion that Strickland would have been the hero of the film if it had been made in the 1950s, something that fascinated the actor. Octavia Spencer, who played the role of Elisa's co-worker, friend, and interpreter Zelda, found it funny that the people del Toro used to speak for the mute main character were people who represent very disenfranchised groups.

=== Filming and visuals ===
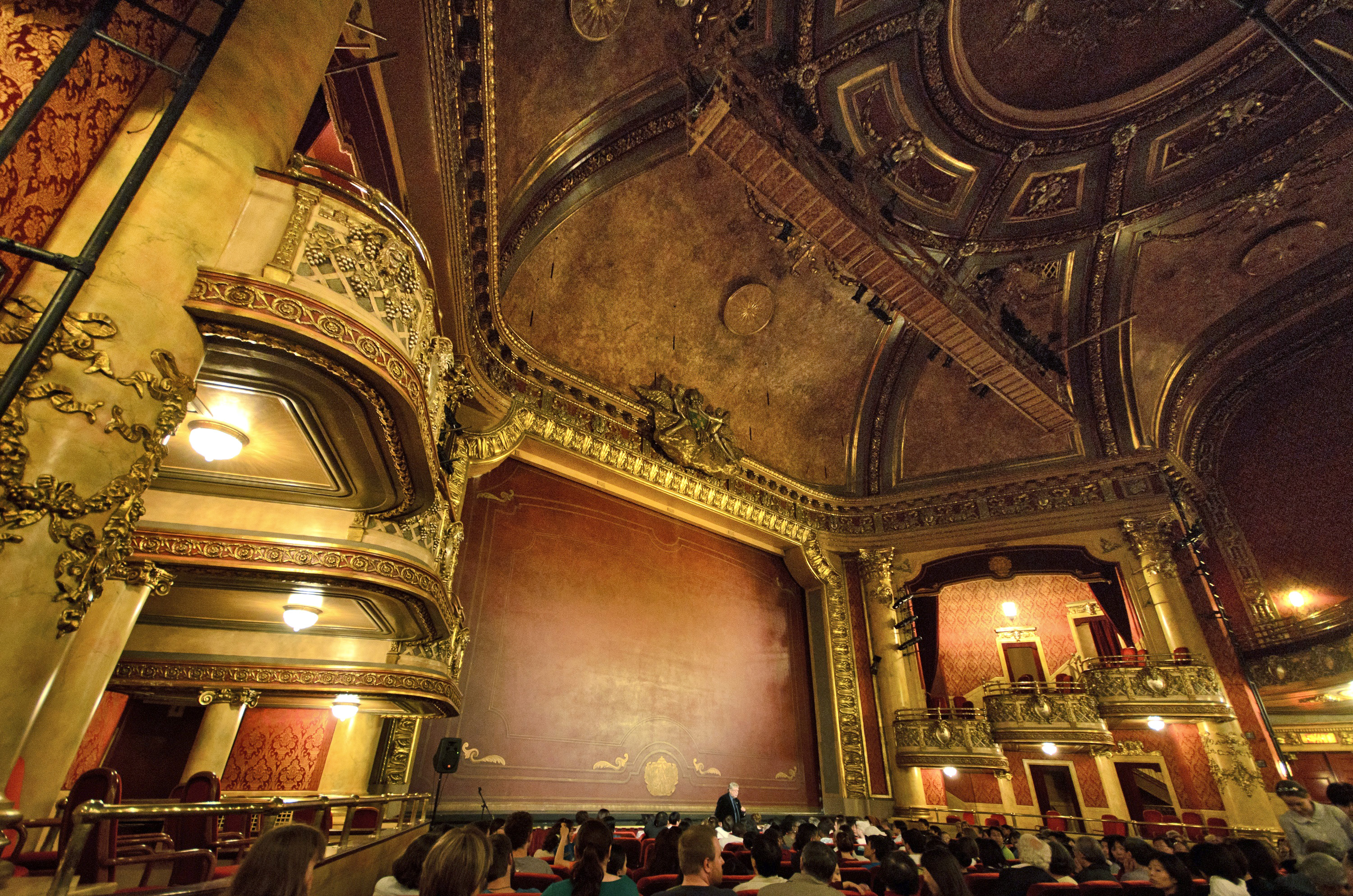
Elgin Theatre, Toronto, the Orpheum cinema of the film

Principal photography began on August 15, 2016, in Toronto and Hamilton, Ontario, and wrapped on November 6, 2016. The interior of the Orpheum (the movie theater seen in the film), is that of the Elgin and Winter Garden Theatres in Toronto, while the exterior of the building is the façade of the Victorian Massey Hall, a performing arts theatre not far from the other one. Elisa and Giles's old flats, which in the film are just above the Orpheum, were actually a set built at Cinespace Studios, West Toronto. Parts of the government laboratory was filmed in the Humanities Wing of the John Andrews Building at the University of Toronto Scarborough.

Del Toro was torn between making the film in color or in black and white, and was at one point leaning toward the latter. Fox Searchlight Pictures offered del Toro either a $20 million budget to make the film in color or a $17 million budget to shoot it in black and white. Del Toro admitted he was in "a battle I was expecting to lose. I was of two minds. On one hand I thought black and white would look luscious, but on the other hand I thought it would look postmodern, like I was being reflective rather than immersed." As a result, he chose to shoot it in color. In an interview with IndieWire about the film, del Toro said the project was a "healing movie for me", as it allowed him to explore and "speak about trust, otherness, sex, love, where we're going. These are not concerns that I had when I was nine or seven."

=== Music ===
Three years before The Shape of Water was released, del Toro met with composer Alexandre Desplat to talk about the film's premise. In January 2017, Desplat was shown a rough cut of the finished film, and finding it similar to a musical, he agreed to compose a score. As a result, Desplat tried to capture the sound of water extensively to have audiences experience a "warm feeling" that is also caused by love. In an interview, he said the melody from the opening scene was "actually made of waves. I did not do that on purpose, but by being completely immersed in this love and these water elements, I wrote a melody that plays arpeggios like waves."

Writing the film score took six weeks; it was purposely composed to create the sense of immersion and to give the "sense that you, yourself, are floating". The two melodies, one titled "Elisa's Theme", are heard at the beginning of the film and later merge into a single piece of music by the end of it. To emphasize this effect and its final result, Desplat changed the sounds of the accompanying flutes, accordions, and whistles to "something blurred". On composing the score overall, he said that it was "a matter of sculpting the music and making it take the shape of the storyline." As a result, Desplat opted out of giving Shannon's character a melody.

The music for The Shape of Water was released on December 1, 2017, by Decca Records. At the 90th Academy Awards, it received the Academy Award for Best Original Score. Desplat noted that "when the movie's that beautiful—and I actually think this movie is a masterpiece—it makes your life much easier. You just have to put your hands on it and it takes you anywhere you want."

== Release ==
The Shape of Water premiered on August 31, 2017, at the 74th Venice International Film Festival, where it was awarded the Golden Lion. It also screened at Telluride Film Festival, the 2017 Toronto International Film Festival, and BFI London Film Festival, among others. The film was released in two theaters in New York City on December 1, 2017, and then expanded to several other cities the following week. It had its official wide release in the United States on December 22, 2017.

=== Home media ===
On March 13, 2018, the film was released on Blu-ray, DVD, and digital download. Special features on the Ultra HD Blu-ray includes a making-of documentary, two featurettes, a MasterClass Q & A with Guillermo del Toro, an interview with artist James Jean, and three theatrical trailers.

== Reception ==
=== Box office ===
The Shape of Water grossed $63.9 million in the United States and Canada, and $131.4 million in other countries, for a total of $195.2 million.

After grossing $4.6 million over a three-week limited release, the film began its wide release on December 22, 2017, alongside the openings of Downsizing, Pitch Perfect 3 and Father Figures, and the wide expansion of Darkest Hour, and grossed $3 million from 726 theaters over the weekend, and $4.4 million over the four-day Christmas frame. The following weekend, the film made $3.5 million. The weekend of January 27, 2018, following the announcement of the film's 13 Oscar nominations, the film was added to over 1,000 theaters (for a total of 1,854) and made $5.9 million (an increase of 171% over the previous week's $2.2 million), finishing 8th. The weekend of March 9–11, following its four Oscar wins, the film made an additional $2.4 million. It marked a 64% increase from the previous week's $1.5 million and was similar to the $2.5 million made by the previous year's Best Picture winner, Moonlight.

=== Critical response ===
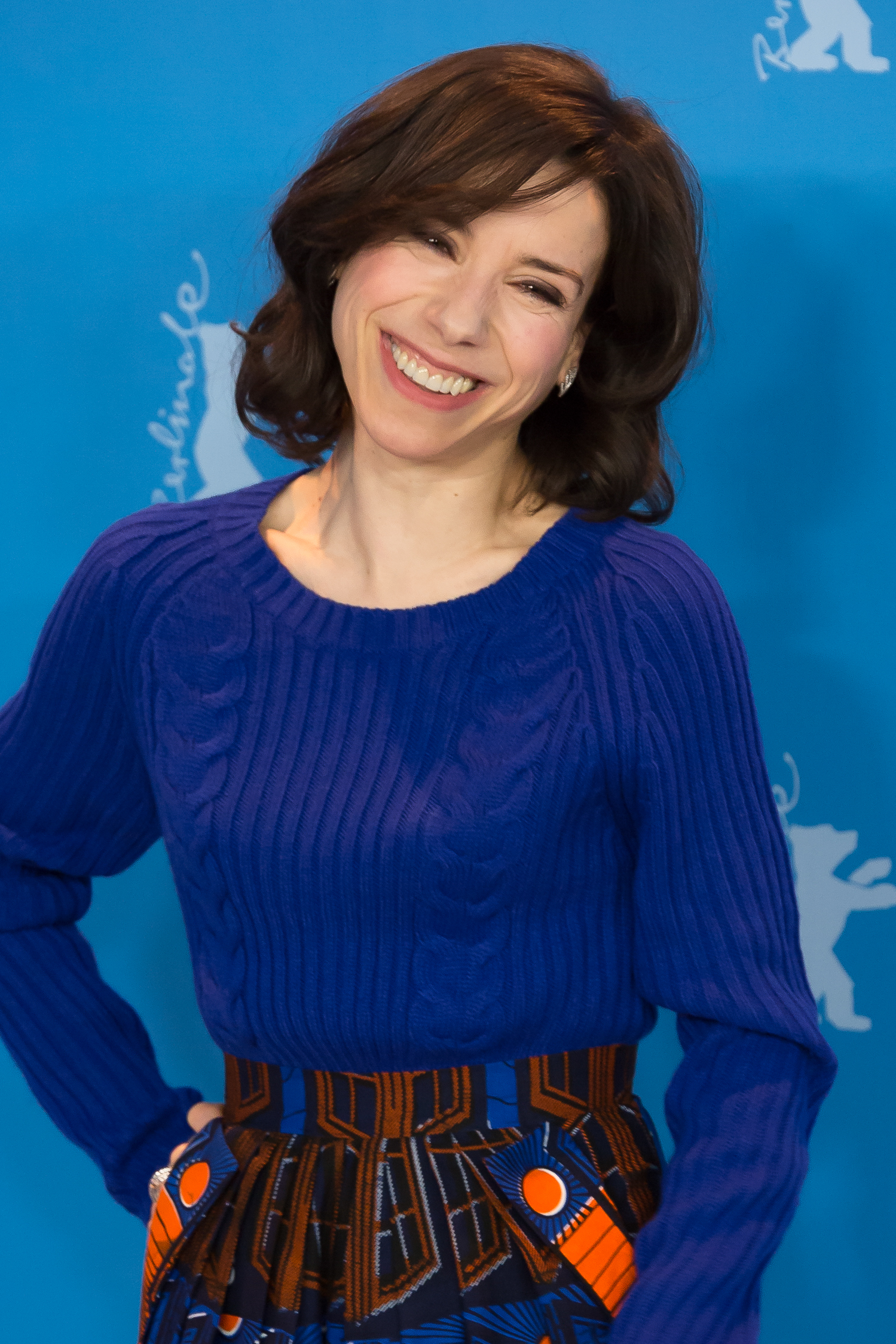
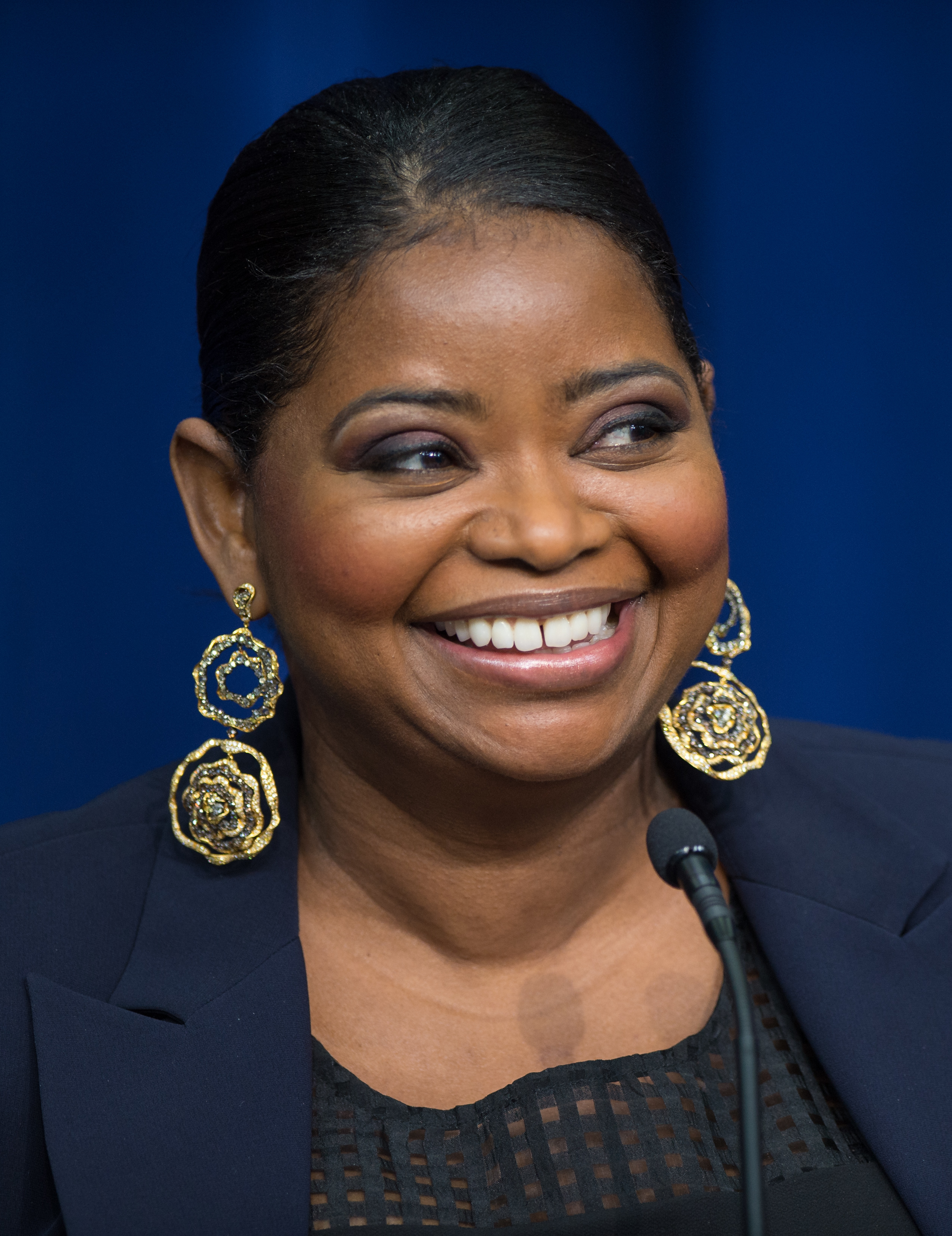
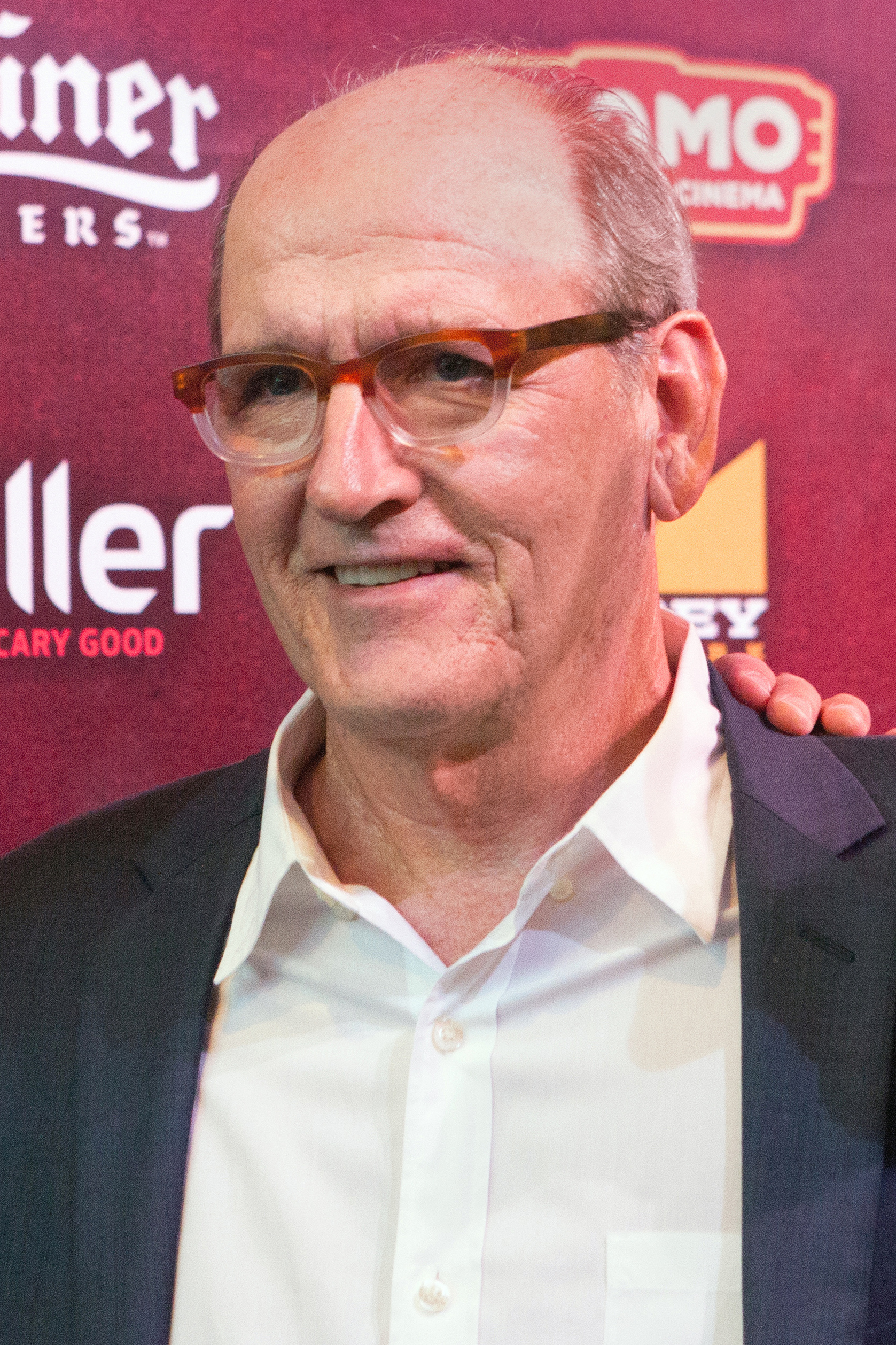
The performances of Sally Hawkins, Octavia Spencer, and Richard Jenkins garnered critical acclaim, earning them Academy Award nominations for Best Actress, Best Supporting Actress, and Best Supporting Actor respectively.

On review aggregator Rotten Tomatoes, the film has an approval rating of 92% based on 465 reviews, with an average rating of 8.3/10. The website's critical consensus reads, "The Shape of Water finds Guillermo del Toro at his visually distinctive best—and matched by an emotionally absorbing story brought to life by a stellar Sally Hawkins performance." On Metacritic, the film has a weighted average score of 87 out of 100, based on 53 critics, indicating "universal acclaim". Audiences polled by CinemaScore gave it positive reviews; audience members under the age of 40 gave the film an average grade of either "A+" or "A", while those over 40 gave it an "A" to "A−", on an A+ to F scale; PostTrak reported that filmgoers gave the film an overall positive score of 80%.

Ben Croll of IndieWire gave the film an 'A' rating and called it "one of del Toro's most stunningly successful works... also a powerful vision of a creative master feeling totally, joyously free." Writing for Rolling Stone, Peter Travers gave the film three and a half out of four stars, praising Hawkins's performance, the cinematography and del Toro's direction, and saying: "Even as the film plunges into torment and tragedy, the core relationship between these two unlikely lovers holds us in thrall. Del Toro is a world-class film artist. There's no sense trying to analyze how he does it." For the Minnesota Daily, Haley Bennett reacted positively, writing, "The Shape of Water has tenderness uncommon to del Toro films. ... While The Shape of Water isn't groundbreaking, it is elegant and mesmerizing."

Rex Reed of the New York Observer gave the film one out of four stars, calling it "a loopy, lunkheaded load of drivel" and that "the whole movie is off the wall". Reed's review was criticized for referring to Hawkins's mute character as "mentally handicapped" and for falsely crediting actor Benicio del Toro (spelled Benecio) as the film's director. Reed also stated Benicio was Spanish, whereas he is Puerto Rican; Guillermo del Toro hails from Mexico.

=== Accolades ===
The Shape of Water received 13 nominations at the 90th Academy Awards, the most of any film in the 2018 race. It won in four categories: Best Production Design, Best Original Score, Best Director, and Best Picture. It was the second fantasy film to win Best Picture, after The Lord of the Rings: The Return of the King (2003).. It was also the first film since Titanic in 1997 to win Best Picture without winning any for acting or any for screenplay and the first since Platoon in 1986 to do so without winning any of its acting nominations or its screenplay nomination. The Shape of Water was acclaimed by critics, who lauded its acting, screenplay, direction, visuals, production design, and musical score. The American Film Institute selected it as one of the top 10 films of the year. At the 75th Golden Globe Awards, the film earned seven nominations, winning for Best Director and Best Original Score. It received twelve nominations at the 71st British Academy Film Awards, winning three awards including Best Director, and fourteen at the 23rd Critics' Choice Awards, winning four awards.

The film also sparked some debate about whether it should have been eligible for a Canadian Screen Awards nomination, as it was filmed in Canada with a predominantly Canadian crew and many Canadian actors in supporting roles. Under Academy of Canadian Cinema and Television rules, to qualify for CSA nominations under the rules for international coproductions, at least 15 percent of a film's funding must come from a Canadian film studio. Even the film's Canadian co-producer, J. Miles Dale, stated that he supports the rules and does not believe the film should have been eligible. The Shape of Water also appeared on many critics' year-end top-ten lists, of which 25 critics chose it as their favorite film of that year. A novelization by del Toro and Kraus was published on March 6, 2018.

In 2025, it was one of the films voted for the "Readers' Choice" edition of The New York Times' list of "The 100 Best Movies of the 21st Century," finishing at number 227.

== Plagiarism accusations ==
In February 2018, the estate of Paul Zindel initiated a lawsuit in United States District Court for the Central District of California against director Guillermo del Toro and associate producer Daniel Kraus, alleging that The Shape of Water "brazenly copies the story, elements, characters, and themes" of Zindel's 1969 work "Let Me Hear You Whisper", In July, 2018, Judge Percy Anderson dismissed the suit with prejudice and stated that del Toro and Fox Searchlight were entitled to recover their legal costs. On April 5, 2021, the following statement by plaintiff was released: "David Zindel, the son of Paul Zindel, author of Let Me Hear You Whisper, acknowledges, based on confidential information obtained during the litigation process, that his claims of plagiarism are unfounded. He acknowledges Guillermo del Toro as the true creator of The Shape of Water. Any similarity between the two works is coincidental."

Comparisons were also drawn between The Shape of Water and the 2015 short film "The Space Between Us", the latter of which was created by Marc S. Nollkaemper as a student project at the Netherlands Film Academy. After screening a copy of The Shape of Water, the Netherlands Film Academy and students issued a statement acknowledging the films as uniquely different and that "They have separate timelines of development and are not in any conceivable way interlinked or related."

== See also ==
- Amphibian Man (film)
