= List of awards and nominations received by Ludwig Göransson =

Ludwig Göransson awards and nominations
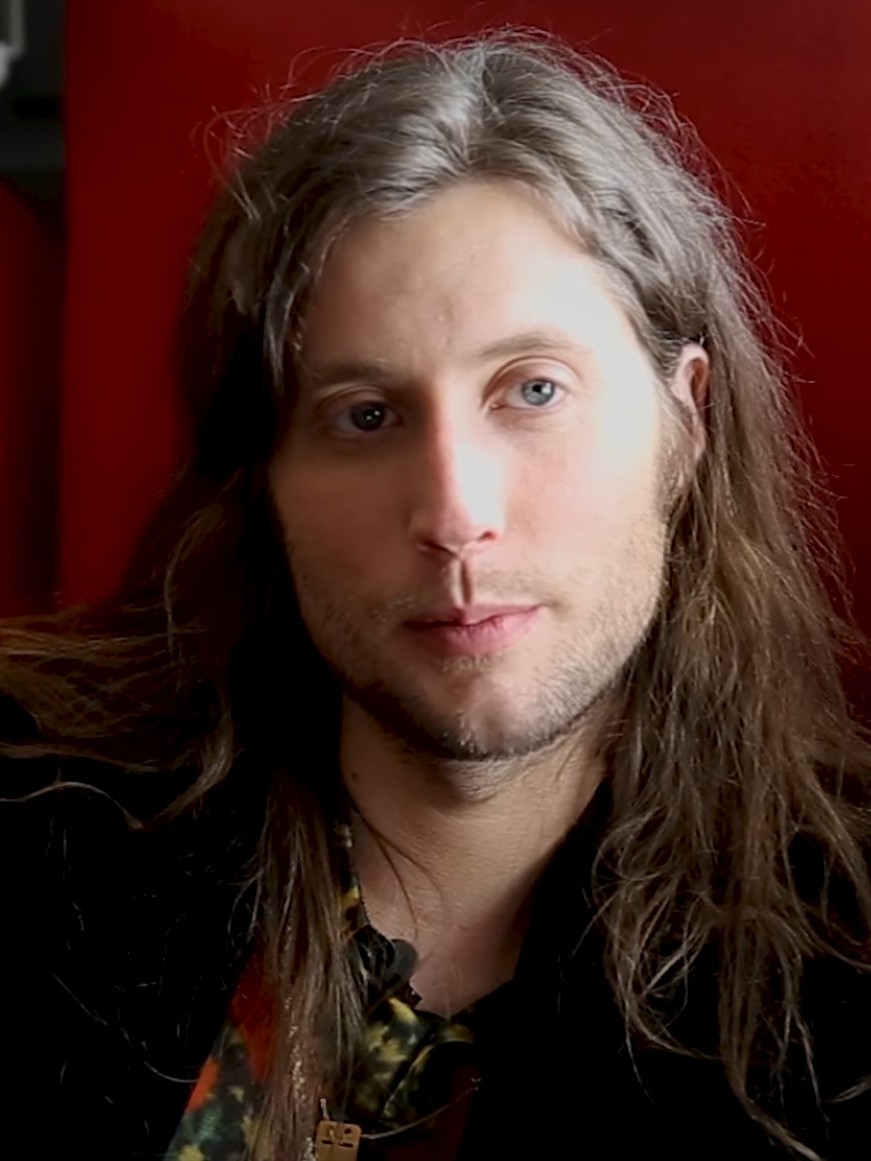
- Göransson in 2018
Awards and nominations
Award	Wins	Nominations
Academy Awards	3	5
British Academy Film Awards	2	2
Golden Globes	2	6
Grammy Awards	6	22
Primetime Emmy Awards	2	2

Totals (Note: Certain award groups do not simply award one winner. They acknowledge several different recipients, have runners-up, and have third place. Since this is a specific recognition and is different from losing an award, runner-up mentions are considered wins in this award tally. For simplification and to avoid errors, each award in this list has been presumed to have had a prior nomination.)
- Wins: 91
- Nominations: 205

Ludwig Göransson is a Swedish composer, conductor and record producer who has received various accolades throughout his career.

He met American film director Ryan Coogler while studying at the USC School of Cinematic Arts and they subsequently became frequent collaborators, with Göransson providing the scores to all of his films, such as Fruitvale Station (2013), Creed (2015), Black Panther (2018) and its sequel Wakanda Forever (2022), and Sinners (2025). For Black Panther, he won the Academy Award for Best Original Score, the Grammy Award for Best Score Soundtrack for Visual Media, and was nominated for the Golden Globe Award for Best Original Score. He received a second Academy Award nomination for Best Original Song thanks to "Lift Me Up", performed by Rihanna and written for the soundtrack of Wakanda Forever. He worked with Christopher Nolan in the films Tenet (2020) and Oppenheimer (2023), the latter of which earned him his first wins at the BAFTA Awards and Golden Globes and his second Academy Award for Best Original Score. The blues-inspired score for Coogler's horror film Sinners earned him additional wins for an Academy Award, a BAFTA Award, a Critics' Choice Award, a Golden Globe Award, and two Grammy Awards. He received similar acclaim for his third collaboration with Nolan, The Odyssey (2026), nominated for the Grammy Award for Best Score Soundtrack for Visual Media.

Göransson has also composed the score for the television series The Mandalorian (2019–2020), part of the Star Wars franchise, which earned him two Primetime Emmy Awards for Outstanding Music Composition for a Series (Original Dramatic Score). In 2026, he returned to the universe with the Grammy-nominated score for the film The Mandalorian and Grogu.

As a music producer, Göransson has frequently collaborated with Donald Glover also known under the stage name Childish Gambino. Overall, their work gathered six Grammy Award nominations, including an Album of the Year nomination for "Awaken, My Love!" (2016) and wins for Record of the Year and Song of the Year for the single "This Is America" (2018), the first rap song to win in these categories.

== Awards and nominations ==
Awards and nominations received by Ludwig Göransson
Award	Year (Note: Indicates the year of ceremony.)	Nominated work	Category	Result	Ref.
Academy Awards	2019	Black Panther	Best Original Score	Won	
Academy Awards	2023	"Lift Me Up" (Note: shared with Ryan Coogler, Rihanna and Tems) (from Black Panther: Wakanda Forever)	Best Original Song	Nominated	
Academy Awards	2024	Oppenheimer	Best Original Score	Won	
Academy Awards	2026	Sinners	Best Original Score	Won	
Academy Awards	2026	"I Lied to You" (Note: shared with Raphael Saadiq) (from Sinners)	Best Original Song	Nominated	
African-American Film Critics Association Awards	2023	"Lift Me Up" (from Black Panther: Wakanda Forever)	Best Song	Won	
African-American Film Critics Association Awards	2025	Sinners	Best Music	Won	
Annie Awards	2023	Turning Red (Note: shared with Billie Eilish and Finneas O'Connell)	Outstanding Achievement for Music in a Feature Production	Nominated	
Astra Awards (Note: formerly known as "Los Angeles Online Film Critics Society Awards" and "Hollywood Critics Association Awards")	2018	Black Panther	Best Score	Nominated	
Astra Awards	2023	"Lift Me Up" (from Black Panther: Wakanda Forever)	Best Original Song	Nominated	
Astra Awards	2024	Oppenheimer	Best Score	Won	
Astra Awards	2026	Sinners	Best Score	Won	
Astra Awards	2026	"I Lied to You" (from Sinners)	Best Original Song	Nominated	
Austin Film Critics Association Awards	2021	Tenet	Best Original Score	Nominated	
Austin Film Critics Association Awards	2024	Oppenheimer	Best Original Score	Won	
Austin Film Critics Association Awards	2025	Sinners	Best Original Score	Won	
BET Awards	2023	"Lift Me Up" (Note: shared with Rihanna) (from Black Panther: Wakanda Forever)	BET Her Award	Nominated	
Black Reel Awards	2014	Fruitvale Station	Outstanding Original Score	Nominated	
Black Reel Awards	2016	Creed	Outstanding Original Score	Nominated	
Black Reel Awards	2016	"Grip" (Note: shared with Sam Dew and Tessa Thompson) (from Creed)	Outstanding Original Song	Nominated	
Black Reel Awards	2016	"Waiting for My Moment" (Note: shared with Jhené Aiko, Ryan Coogler, Donald Glover and Vince Staples) (from Creed)	Outstanding Original Song	Nominated	
Black Reel Awards	2017	Atlanta	Outstanding Music (Comedy, Drama, TV Movie or Limited Series)	Nominated	
Black Reel Awards	2019	Black Panther	Outstanding Original Score	Nominated	
Black Reel Awards	2019	Creed II	Outstanding Original Score	Nominated	
Black Reel Awards	2023	"Born Again" (Note: shared with The-Dream, James Fauntleroy and Rihanna) (from Black Panther: Wakanda Forever)	Outstanding Original Song	Nominated	
Black Reel Awards	2023	"Lift Me Up" (from Black Panther: Wakanda Forever)	Outstanding Original Song	Won	
Black Reel Awards	2026	Sinners	Outstanding Original Score	Won	
Black Reel Awards	2026	"I Lied to You" (from Sinners)	Outstanding Original Song	Won	
Black Reel Awards	2026	"Last Time (I Seen The Sun)" (Note: shared with Miles Caton and Alice Smith) (from Sinners)	Outstanding Original Song	Nominated	
Black Reel Awards	2026	"Pale, Pale Moon" (Note: shared with Brittany Howard) (from Sinners)	Outstanding Original Song	Nominated	
BMI Film & TV Awards	2021	The Mandalorian (season 1)	BMI Streaming Series Award	Won	
BMI Film & TV Awards	2021	Tenet	BMI Theatrical Film Award	Won	
BMI Film & TV Awards	2022	The Mandalorian (season 2)	BMI Streaming Series Award	Won	
BMI Film & TV Awards	2023	Black Panther: Wakanda Forever	BMI Theatrical Film Award	Won	
BMI Film & TV Awards	2023	Turning Red	BMI Streaming Film Award	Won	
BMI Film & TV Awards	2023	The Book of Boba Fett (Note: shared with Joseph Shirley)	BMI Streaming Series Award	Won	
BMI Film & TV Awards	2024	Oppenheimer	BMI Theatrical Film Award	Won	
BMI Film & TV Awards	2024	The Mandalorian (season 3)	BMI Streaming Series Award	Won	
BMI Film & TV Awards	2026	Sinners	BMI Theatrical Film Award	Won	
Boston Online Film Critics Association Awards	2023	Oppenheimer	Best Score	Won	
Boston Online Film Critics Association Awards	2025	Sinners	Best Score	Won	
Boston Society of Film Critics Awards	2015	Creed	Best Use of Music in a Film	Nominated	
Boston Society of Film Critics Awards	2025	Sinners	Best Original Score	Won	
British Academy Film Awards	2024	Oppenheimer	Best Original Music	Won	
British Academy Film Awards	2026	Sinners	Best Original Music	Won	
Capri Hollywood International Film Festival Awards	2024	Oppenheimer	Best Original Score	Won	
Chicago Film Critics Association Awards	2020	Tenet	Best Original Score	Nominated	
Chicago Film Critics Association Awards	2023	Oppenheimer	Best Original Score	Nominated	
Chicago Film Critics Association Awards	2025	Sinners	Best Original Score	Nominated	
Critics' Choice Awards	2019	Black Panther	Best Score	Nominated	
Critics' Choice Awards	2021	Tenet	Best Score	Nominated	
Critics' Choice Awards	2023	"Lift Me Up" (from Black Panther: Wakanda Forever)	Best Song	Nominated	
Critics' Choice Awards	2024	Oppenheimer	Best Score	Won	
Critics' Choice Awards	2026	Sinners	Best Score	Won	
Critics' Choice Awards	2026	"I Lied to You" (from Sinners)	Best Song	Nominated	
Dallas–Fort Worth Film Critics Association Awards	2023	Oppenheimer	Best Musical Score	Runner-up	
Dallas–Fort Worth Film Critics Association Awards	2025	Sinners	Best Musical Score	Won	
Dorian Awards	2024	Oppenheimer	Film Music of the Year	Nominated	
Dorian Awards	2026	Sinners	Film Music of the Year	Won	
Fangoria Chainsaw Awards	2025	Sinners	Best Score	Won	
Florida Film Critics Circle Awards	2020	Tenet	Best Score	Runner-up	
Florida Film Critics Circle Awards	2023	Oppenheimer	Best Score	Runner-up	
Florida Film Critics Circle Awards	2025	Sinners	Best Score	Won	
Georgia Film Critics Association Awards	2019	Black Panther	Best Original Score	Nominated	
Georgia Film Critics Association Awards	2021	Tenet	Best Original Score	Nominated	
Georgia Film Critics Association Awards	2023	Black Panther: Wakanda Forever	Best Original Score	Nominated	
Georgia Film Critics Association Awards	2023	"Lift Me Up" (from Black Panther: Wakanda Forever)	Best Original Song	Nominated	
Georgia Film Critics Association Awards	2024	Oppenheimer	Best Original Score	Won	
Georgia Film Critics Association Awards	2025	Sinners	Best Original Score	Won	
Georgia Film Critics Association Awards	2025	"I Lied to You" (from Sinners)	Best Original Song	Won	
Georgia Film Critics Association Awards	2025	"Last Time (I Seen The Sun)" (from Sinners)	Best Original Song	Nominated	
Golden Globes	2019	Black Panther	Best Original Score	Nominated	
Golden Globes	2021	Tenet	Best Original Score	Nominated	
Golden Globes	2023	"Lift Me Up" (from Black Panther: Wakanda Forever)	Best Original Song	Nominated	
Golden Globes	2024	Oppenheimer	Best Original Score	Won	
Golden Globes	2026	Sinners	Best Original Score	Won	
Golden Globes	2026	"I Lied to You" (from Sinners)	Best Original Song	Nominated	
Grammis	2017	Ludwig Göransson	Producer of the Year	Nominated	
Grammis	2019	Black Panther	Composer of the Year	Won	
Grammis	2019	Black Panther	Producer of the Year	Nominated	
Grammis	2021	Ludwig Göransson	Composer of the Year	Nominated	
Grammis	2023	Black Panther: Wakanda Forever	Composer of the Year	Won	
Grammis	2024	Oppenheimer	Composer of the Year	Won	
Grammis	2026	Sinners	Composer of the Year	Nominated	
Grammy Awards	2018	"Awaken, My Love!"	Album of the Year	Nominated	
Grammy Awards	2018	"Redbone"	Record of the Year	Nominated	
Grammy Awards	2018	"Redbone"	Best R&B Song	Nominated	
Grammy Awards	2019	"This Is America"	Record of the Year	Won	
Grammy Awards	2019	"This Is America"	Song of the Year	Won	
Grammy Awards	2019	"Feels Like Summer"	Best R&B Song	Nominated	
Grammy Awards	2019	Black Panther	Best Score Soundtrack for Visual Media	Won	
Grammy Awards	2022	The Mandalorian: Season 2 – Vol. 2 (Chapters 13–16)	Best Score Soundtrack for Visual Media	Nominated	
Grammy Awards	2023	30	Album of the Year	Nominated	
Grammy Awards	2024	Black Panther: Wakanda Forever	Best Score Soundtrack for Visual Media	Nominated	
Grammy Awards	2024	Oppenheimer	Best Score Soundtrack for Visual Media	Won	
Grammy Awards	2024	Black Panther: Wakanda Forever – Music from and Inspired By	Best Compilation Soundtrack for Visual Media	Nominated	
Grammy Awards	2024	"Lift Me Up" (from Black Panther: Wakanda Forever)	Best Song Written for Visual Media	Nominated	
Grammy Awards	2024	"Can You Hear the Music" (from Oppenheimer)	Best Instrumental Composition	Nominated	
Grammy Awards	2024	"Can You Hear the Music" (from Oppenheimer)	Best Arrangement, Instrumental or A Cappella	Nominated	
Grammy Awards	2026	Sinners: Original Motion Picture Score	Best Score Soundtrack for Visual Media	Won	
Grammy Awards	2026	Sinners: Original Motion Picture Soundtrack	Best Compilation Soundtrack for Visual Media	Won	
Grammy Awards	2026	"I Lied to You" (from Sinners)	Best Song Written for Visual Media	Nominated	
Grammy Awards	2026	"Pale, Pale Moon" (from Sinners)	Best Song Written for Visual Media	Nominated	
Grammy Awards	2026	"Why You Here / Before the Sun Went Down" (from Sinners)	Best Instrumental Composition	Nominated	
Grammy Awards	2027	The Mandalorian and Grogu	Best Score Soundtrack for Visual Media	Pending	
Grammy Awards	2027	The Odyssey	Best Score Soundtrack for Visual Media	Pending	
Guild of Music Supervisors Awards	2023	"Lift Me Up" (from Black Panther: Wakanda Forever)	Best Song Written and/or Recording Created for a Film	Nominated	
Guild of Music Supervisors Awards	2026	"I Lied to You" (from Sinners)	Best Song Written and/or Recording Created for a Film	Won	
Guild of Music Supervisors Awards	2026	"Last Time (I Seen The Sun)" (from Sinners)	Best Song Written and/or Recording Created for a Film	Nominated	
Hollywood Music in Media Awards	2018	Black Panther	Best Original Score in a Sci-Fi/Fantasy Film	Won	
Hollywood Music in Media Awards	2021	Tenet	Best Original Score in a Sci-Fi/Fantasy Film	Won	
Hollywood Music in Media Awards	2021	"Just Sing" (Note: shared with Sarah Aarons, Max Martin and Justin Timberlake) (from Trolls World Tour)	Best Original Song in an Animated Film	Won	
Hollywood Music in Media Awards	2021	"The Plan" (Note: shared with Travis Scott and WondaGurl) (from Tenet)	Best Original Song in a Feature Film	Nominated	
Hollywood Music in Media Awards	2022	Turning Red (Note: shared with Finneas O'Connell)	Best Original Score in an Animated Film	Nominated	
Hollywood Music in Media Awards	2022	Black Panther: Wakanda Forever	Best Original Score in a Sci-Fi/Fantasy Film	Nominated	
Hollywood Music in Media Awards	2022	"Lift Me Up" (from Black Panther: Wakanda Forever)	Best Original Song in a Feature Film	Won	
Hollywood Music in Media Awards	2022	Turning Red (Note: shared with 4*TOWN and Finneas O'Connell)	Best Soundtrack Album	Nominated	
Hollywood Music in Media Awards	2023	Oppenheimer	Best Original Score in a Feature Film	Nominated	
Hollywood Music in Media Awards	2025	Sinners	Best Original Score in a Feature Film	Won	
Hollywood Music in Media Awards	2025	"I Lied to You" (from Sinners)	Best Original Song in a Feature Film	Won	
Hollywood Music in Media Awards	2025	"Last Time (I Seen The Sun)" (from Sinners)	Best Original Song in a Feature Film	Nominated	
Hollywood Music in Media Awards	2026	The Odyssey	Best Original Score in a Feature Film	Won	
Hollywood Music in Media Awards	2026	"When I'm Home" (from The Odyssey) (Note: shared with James Blake, Christopher Nolan and Travis Scott)	Best Original Song in a Feature Film	Nominated	
Houston Film Critics Society Awards	2019	Black Panther	Best Original Score	Nominated	
Houston Film Critics Society Awards	2021	Tenet	Best Original Score	Nominated	
Houston Film Critics Society Awards	2023	"Lift Me Up" (from Black Panther: Wakanda Forever)	Best Original Song	Nominated	
Houston Film Critics Society Awards	2024	Oppenheimer	Best Original Score	Nominated	
Houston Film Critics Society Awards	2026	Sinners	Best Original Score	Won	
Houston Film Critics Society Awards	2026	"I Lied to You" (from Sinners)	Best Original Song	Nominated	
Houston Film Critics Society Awards	2026	"Last Time (I Seen The Sun)" (from Sinners)	Best Original Song	Nominated	
International Film Music Critics Association Awards	2016	Ludwig Göransson	Breakthrough Film Composer of the Year	Nominated	
International Film Music Critics Association Awards	2016	Creed	Best Original Score for a Drama Film	Nominated	
International Film Music Critics Association Awards	2019	Ludwig Göransson	Film Composer of the Year	Nominated	
International Film Music Critics Association Awards	2019	Black Panther	Film Score of the Year	Nominated	
International Film Music Critics Association Awards	2019	Black Panther	Best Original Score for a Fantasy/Science Fiction/Horror Film	Nominated	
International Film Music Critics Association Awards	2021	Tenet	Best Original Score for an Action/Adventure/Thriller Film	Nominated	
International Film Music Critics Association Awards	2021	The Mandalorian	Best Original Score for Television	Nominated	
International Film Music Critics Association Awards	2024	Oppenheimer	Film Score of the Year	Nominated	
International Film Music Critics Association Awards	2024	Oppenheimer	Best Original Score for a Drama Film	Won	
International Film Music Critics Association Awards	2024	"Can You Hear the Music" (from Oppenheimer)	Composition of the Year	Nominated	
International Film Music Critics Association Awards	2026	Ludwig Göransson	Film Composer of the Year	Nominated	
International Film Music Critics Association Awards	2026	Sinners	Film Score of the Year	Nominated	
International Film Music Critics Association Awards	2026	Sinners	Best Original Score for a Fantasy/Science Fiction/Horror Film	Nominated	
Kansas City Film Critics Circle Awards	2024	Oppenheimer	Best Score	Won	
Kansas City Film Critics Circle Awards	2025	Sinners	Best Score	Won	
Las Vegas Film Critics Society Awards	2022	"Lift Me Up" (from Black Panther: Wakanda Forever)	Best Song	Nominated	
Las Vegas Film Critics Society Awards	2025	Sinners	Best Score	Won	
Las Vegas Film Critics Society Awards	2025	"I Lied to You" (from Sinners)	Best Song	Won	
London Film Critics' Circle Awards	2026	Sinners	Technical Achievement Award	Won	
Los Angeles Film Critics Association Awards	2025	Sinners	Best Music	Runner-up	
Musikförläggarnas pris	2018	Ludwig Göransson	Composer of the Year	Won	
Musikförläggarnas pris	2024	Ludwig Göransson	Composer of the Year	Won	
NAACP Image Awards	2023	Black Panther: Wakanda Forever – Music from and Inspired By (Note: shared with Ryan Coogler, Archie Davis and Dave Jordan)	Outstanding Soundtrack/Compilation Album	Won	
NAACP Image Awards	2024	Creed III: The Soundtrack (Note: shared with Frank Brim, Archie Davis and Michael B. Jordan)	Outstanding Soundtrack/Compilation Album	Nominated	
New York Film Critics Online Awards	2025	Sinners	Best Use of Music	Won	
Online Film Critics Society Awards	2019	Black Panther	Best Original Score	Nominated	
Online Film Critics Society Awards	2021	Tenet	Best Original Score	Nominated	
Online Film Critics Society Awards	2024	Oppenheimer	Best Original Score	Won	
Online Film Critics Society Awards	2026	Sinners	Best Original Score	Won	
Paris Film Critics Association Awards	2024	Oppenheimer	Best Original Score	Nominated	
Paris Film Critics Association Awards	2026	Sinners	Best Original Score	Nominated	
Phoenix Film Critics Society Awards	2022	"Lift Me Up" (from Black Panther: Wakanda Forever)	Best Original Song	Won	
Phoenix Film Critics Society Awards	2023	Oppenheimer	Best Original Score	Won	
Phoenix Film Critics Society Awards	2025	Sinners	Best Original Score	Won	
Phoenix Film Critics Society Awards	2025	"I Lied to You" (from Sinners)	Best Original Song	Won	
Primetime Emmy Awards	2020	The Mandalorian (for the episode "Chapter 8: Redemption")	Outstanding Music Composition for a Series (Original Dramatic Score)	Won	
Primetime Emmy Awards	2021	The Mandalorian (for the episode "Chapter 16: The Rescue")	Outstanding Music Composition for a Series (Original Dramatic Score)	Won	
San Diego Film Critics Society Awards	2025	Sinners	Best Use of Music	Won	
San Francisco Bay Area Film Critics Circle Awards	2018	Black Panther	Best Original Score	Nominated	
San Francisco Bay Area Film Critics Circle Awards	2024	Oppenheimer	Best Original Score	Nominated	
San Francisco Bay Area Film Critics Circle Awards	2025	Sinners	Best Original Score	Won	
Santa Barbara International Film Festival Awards	2024	Oppenheimer	Variety Artisans Award – Composer	Won	
Satellite Awards	2021	Tenet	Best Original Score	Nominated	
Satellite Awards	2023	"Lift Me Up" (from Black Panther: Wakanda Forever)	Best Original Song	Nominated	
Satellite Awards	2024	Oppenheimer	Best Original Score	Nominated	
Satellite Awards	2026	Sinners	Best Original Score	Won	
Satellite Awards	2026	"I Lied to You" (from Sinners)	Best Original Song	Nominated	
Saturn Awards	2018	Black Panther	Best Film Music	Nominated	
Saturn Awards	2021	Tenet	Best Film Music	Nominated	
Saturn Awards	2026	Sinners	Best Film Music	Nominated	
Seattle Film Critics Society Awards	2021	Tenet	Best Original Score	Nominated	
Seattle Film Critics Society Awards	2024	Oppenheimer	Best Original Score	Won	
Seattle Film Critics Society Awards	2025	Sinners	Best Original Score	Nominated	
Society of Composers & Lyricists Awards	2021	Tenet	Outstanding Original Score for a Studio Film	Nominated	
Society of Composers & Lyricists Awards	2021	The Mandalorian	Outstanding Original Score for a Television Production	Nominated	
Society of Composers & Lyricists Awards	2023	"Lift Me Up" (from Black Panther: Wakanda Forever)	Outstanding Original Song for a Dramatic or Documentary Visual Media Production	Nominated	
Society of Composers & Lyricists Awards	2024	Oppenheimer	Outstanding Original Score for a Studio Film	Won	
Society of Composers & Lyricists Awards	2026	Sinners	Outstanding Original Score for a Studio Film	Won	
Society of Composers & Lyricists Awards	2026	"I Lied to You" (from Sinners)	Outstanding Original Song for a Dramatic or Documentary Visual Media Production	Won	
Society of Composers & Lyricists Awards	2026	"Last Time (I Seen The Sun)" (from Sinners)	Outstanding Original Song for a Dramatic or Documentary Visual Media Production	Nominated	
Soul Train Music Awards	2017	"Redbone" (Note: shared with George Clinton, Bootsy Collins, Gary "Muddbone" Cooper and Donald Glover)	The Ashford & Simpson Songwriter's Award	Nominated	
Soul Train Music Awards	2018	"Summertime Magic" (Note: shared with Donald Glover)	The Ashford & Simpson Songwriter's Award	Nominated	
Southeastern Film Critics Association Awards	2023	Oppenheimer	Best Score	Won	
Southeastern Film Critics Association Awards	2025	Sinners	Best Score	Won	
St. Louis Film Critics Association Awards	2021	Tenet	Best Score	Nominated	
St. Louis Film Critics Association Awards	2023	Oppenheimer	Best Score	Won	
St. Louis Film Critics Association Awards	2025	Sinners	Best Score	Nominated	
Washington D.C. Area Film Critics Association Awards	2018	Black Panther	Best Score	Nominated	
Washington D.C. Area Film Critics Association Awards	2021	Tenet	Best Score	Nominated	
Washington D.C. Area Film Critics Association Awards	2023	Oppenheimer	Best Score	Won	
Washington D.C. Area Film Critics Association Awards	2025	Sinners	Best Score	Won	
World Soundtrack Awards	2021	The Mandalorian (season 2)	Television Composer of the Year	Nominated	
World Soundtrack Awards	2023	"Lift Me Up" (from Black Panther: Wakanda Forever)	Best Original Song	Nominated	
World Soundtrack Awards	2024	Oppenheimer	Film Composer of the Year	Nominated	
World Soundtrack Awards	2025	"I Lied to You" (from Sinners)	Best Original Song	Nominated	
