= Houston Film Critics Society Awards 2018 =

Annual US film awards ceremony

12th Houston Film Critics Society Awards
- Date: January 3, 2019
- Location: Midtown Arts and Theater Complex Houston, Houston, Texas
- Presented by: Houston Film Critics Society
- Website: www.houstonfilmcritics.org

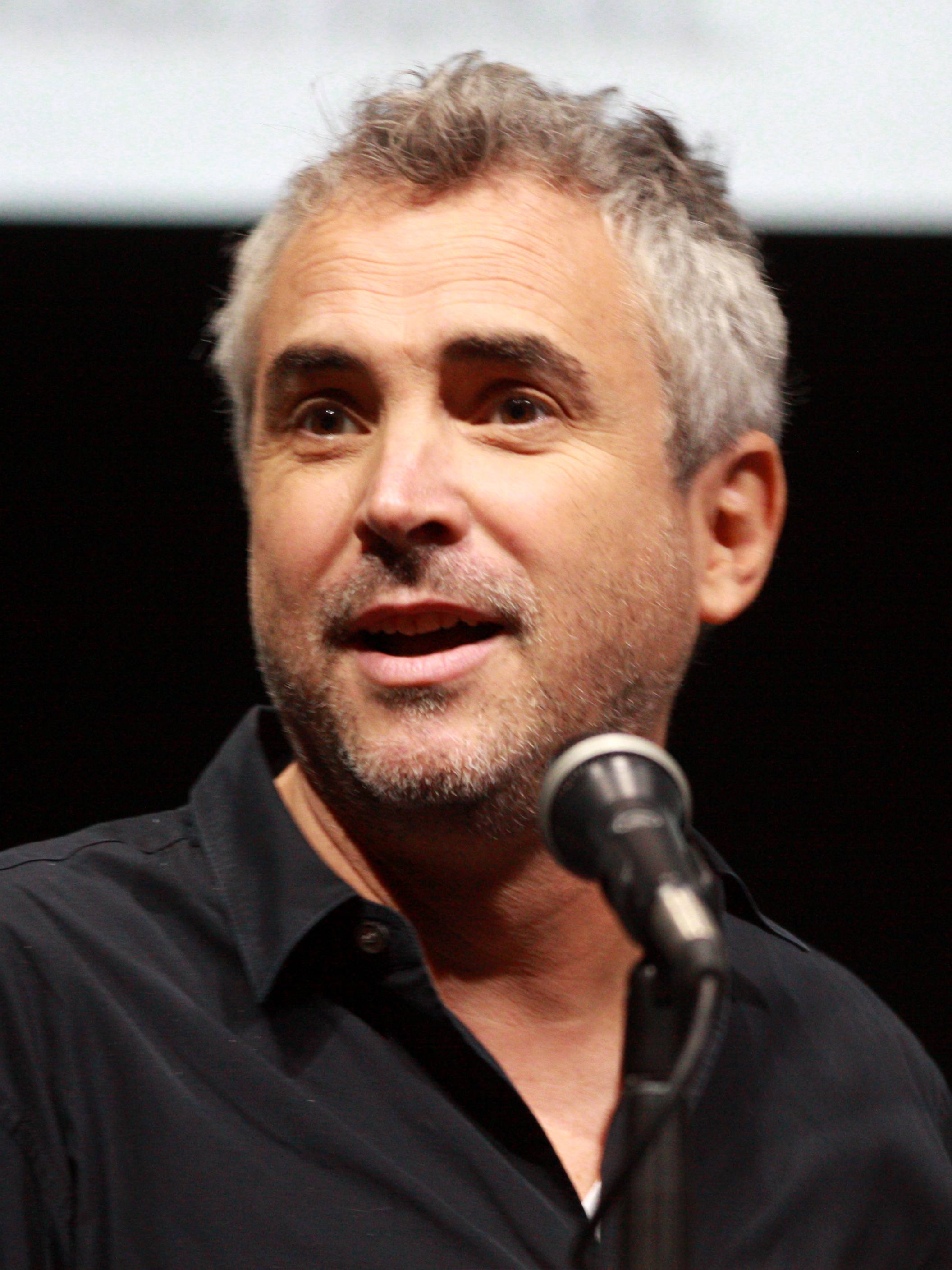
Alfonso Cuaró, 2013, best director award

The 12th Houston Film Critics Society Awards nominations were announced on December 17, 2018. The ceremony was held on January 3, 2019.

== Winners and nominees ==
Winners are listed first and highlighted with boldface.

Best Picture	Best Foreign Language Film
**The Favourite**; A Star is Born; Black Panther; BlacKkKlansman; Eighth Grade; If Beale Street Could Talk; First Reformed; Green Book; Hereditary; Roma; Vice	**Roma** • Mexico; Burning • South Korea; Border • Sweden; Cold War • Poland; Shoplifters • Japan
Best Actor	Best Actress
**Christian Bale - Vice**; Bradley Cooper - A Star is Born; Ethan Hawke - First Reformed; Rami Malek - Bohemian Rhapsody; Viggo Mortensen - Green Book	**Toni Collette - Hereditary**; Glenn Close - The Wife; Olivia Colman - The Favourite; Lady Gaga - A Star is Born; Melissa McCarthy - Can You Ever Forgive Me?
Best Supporting Actor	Best Supporting Actress
**Mahershala Ali - Green Book**; Timothee Chalamet - Beautiful Boy; Adam Driver - BlacKkKlansman; Richard E. Grant - Can You Ever Forgive Me?; Michael B. Jordan - Black Panther	**Rachel Weisz - The Favourite**; Amy Adams - Vice; Claire Foy - First Man; Regina King - If Beale Street Could Talk; Emma Stone - The Favourite
Best Director	Best Cinematography
**Alfonso Cuarón - Roma**; Bradley Cooper - A Star is Born; Barry Jenkins - If Beale Street Could Talk; Yorgos Lanthimos - The Favourite; Adam McKay - Vice	**Alfonso Cuarón - Roma**; Rachel Morrison - Black Panther; Linus Sandgren - First Man; Robbie Ryan - The Favourite; James Laxton - If Beale Street Could Talk
Best Animated Feature Film	Best Documentary Feature
**Isle of Dogs**; Incredibles 2; Mirai; Ralph Breaks the Internet; Spider-Man: Into the Spider-Verse	**Won’t You Be My Neighbor?**; Free Solo; Minding the Gap; RBG; Three Identical Strangers
Best Original Score	Best Original Song
**Nicholas Britell - If Beale Street Could Talk**; Ludwig Göransson - Black Panther; Justin Hurwitz - First Man; Alexandre Desplat - Isle of Dogs; Thom Yorke - Suspiria	**Shallow - A Star is Born**; All the Stars - Black Panther; Ashes - Deadpool 2; Hearts Beat Loud - Hearts Beat Loud; Revelation - Boy Erased
Best Screenplay	Best Visual Effects
**The Favourite - Deborah Davis & Tony McNamara**; Eighth Grade - Bo Burnham; First Reformed - Paul Schrader; If Beale Street Could Talk - Barry Jenkins; Vice - Adam McKay	**First Man**; Black Panther; Mission: Impossible – Fallout
Best Poster	Texas Independent Film Award
**BlacKkKlansman**; Mandy; Suspiria	**The Standoff at Sparrow Creek**; 1985; An American in Texas; Support the Girls; Tejano
Best Worst Film	Cinematic Achievement
**The Happytime Murders**; The 15:17 to Paris; Life Itself; Peppermint; Venom	Local filmmaker **Damir Catic** was bestowed a special award for outstanding cinematic contribution to the Houston scene.

== Movies with multiple nominations and awards ==
The following films received multiple nominations:

Nominations	Film
7	The Favourite
6	Black Panther
6	If Beale Street Could Talk
5	A Star is Born
5	Vice
4	First Man
4	Roma
3	BlacKkKlansman
3	First Reformed
3	Green Book
2	Eighth Grade
2	Hereditary
2	Can You Ever Forgive Me?
2	Isle of Dogs
2	Suspiria
