= Georgia Film Critics Association Awards 2025 =

Annual film critics awards

15th Georgia Film Critics Association Awards
- Date: December 27, 2025
- Site: Georgia, U.S.

Highlights
- Best Picture: One Battle After Another
- Most awards: One Battle After Another (5)
- Most nominations: One Battle After Another (12)

The 15th Georgia Film Critics Association Awards were presented to recognize the best in filmmaking in 2025. The winners were announced on December 27, 2025.

The nominations were announced on December 19, 2025. Paul Thomas Anderson's action thriller film One Battle After Another, loosely based on the Thomas Pynchon novel Vineland, led the nominations with twelve, followed by Sinners with ten and Sentimental Value with eight.

== Winners and nominees ==
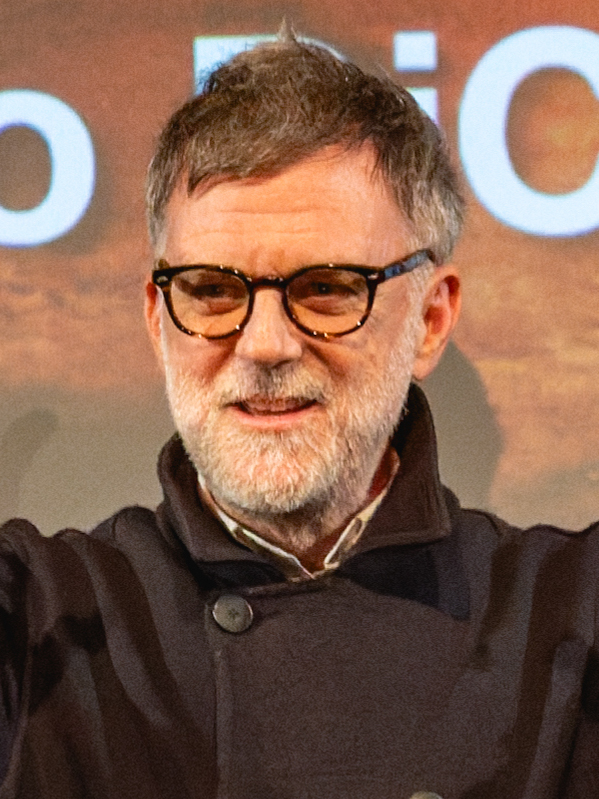
Paul Thomas Anderson, Best Director and Best Adapted Screenplay winner

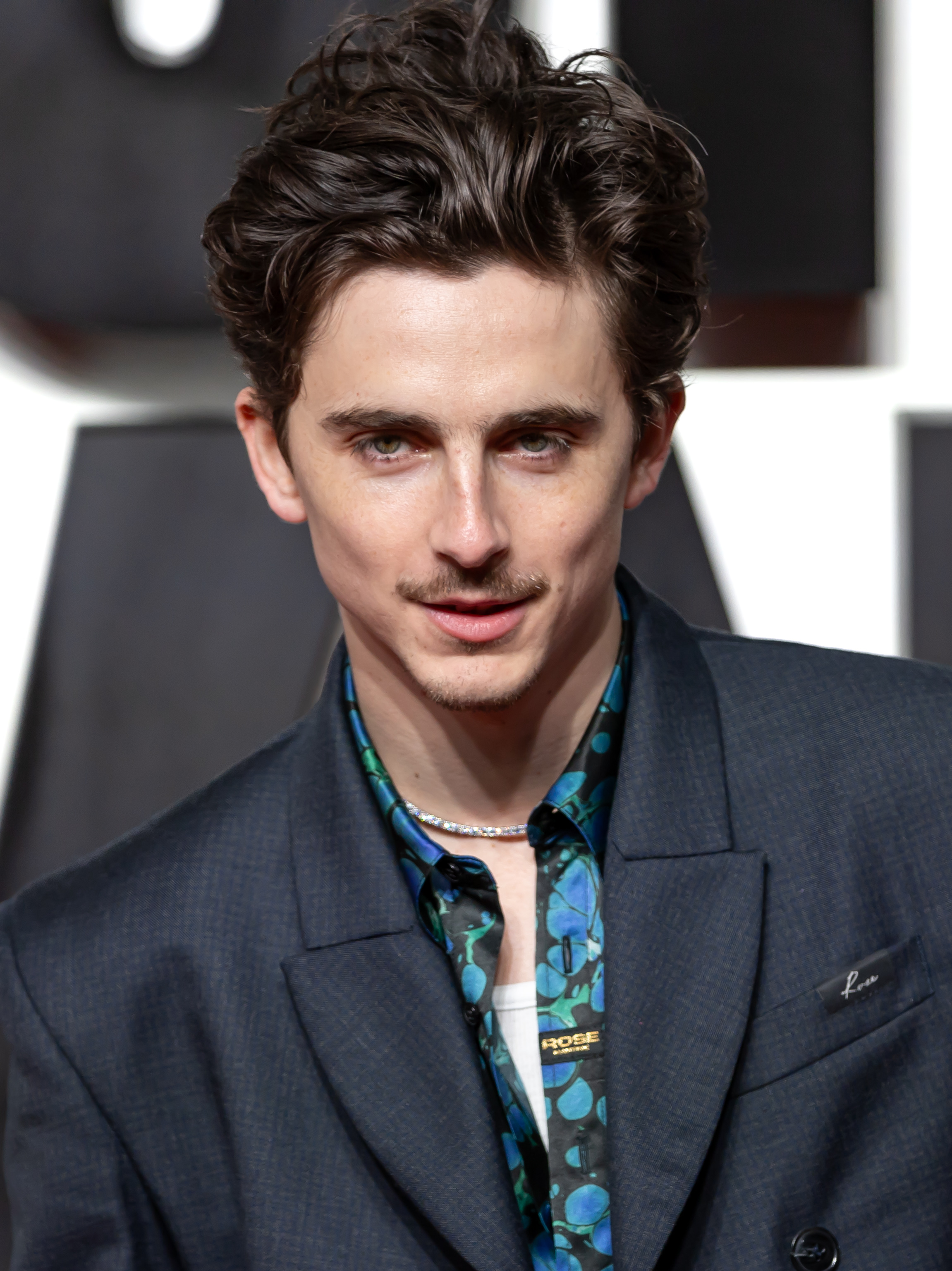
Timothée Chalamet, Best Actor winner

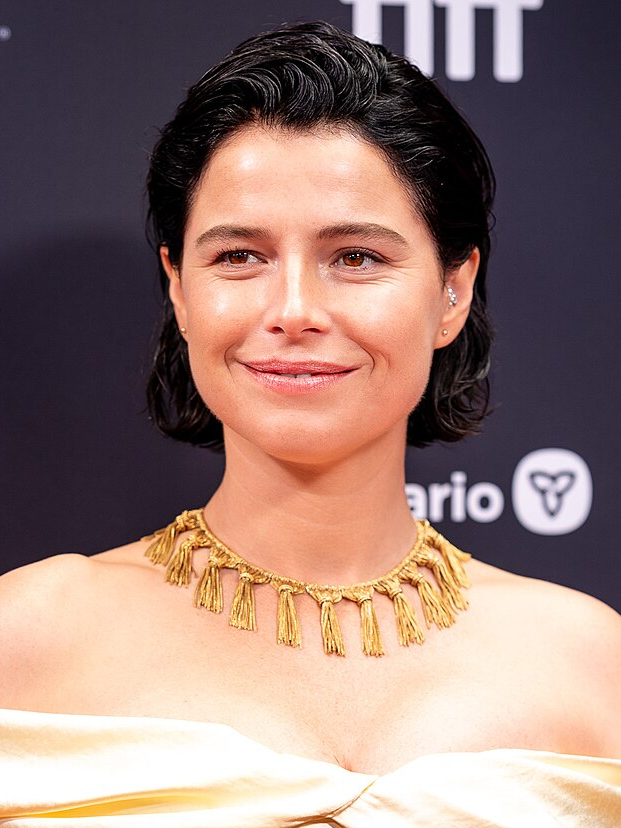
Jessie Buckley, Best Actress winner

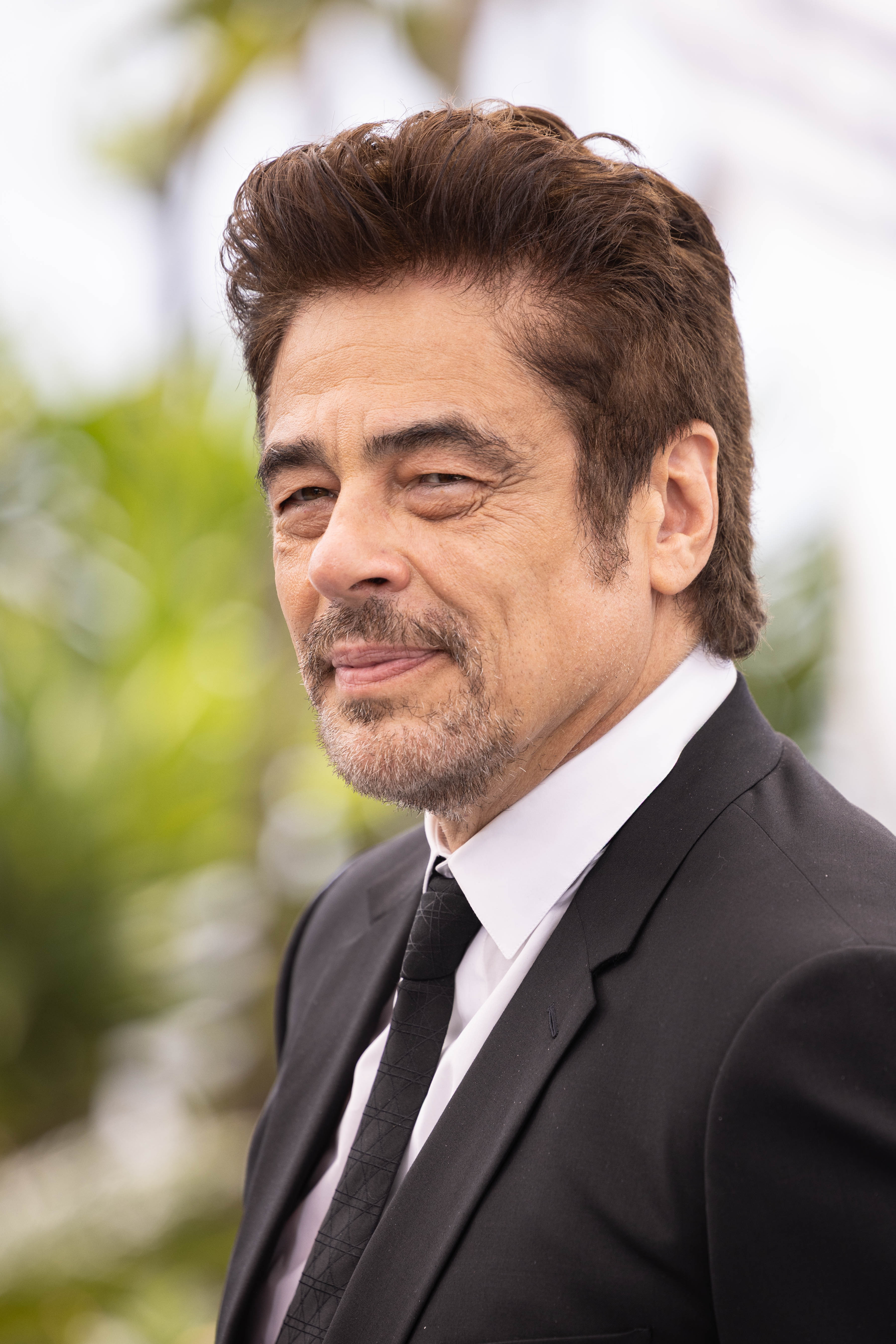
Benicio del Toro, Best Supporting Actor winner

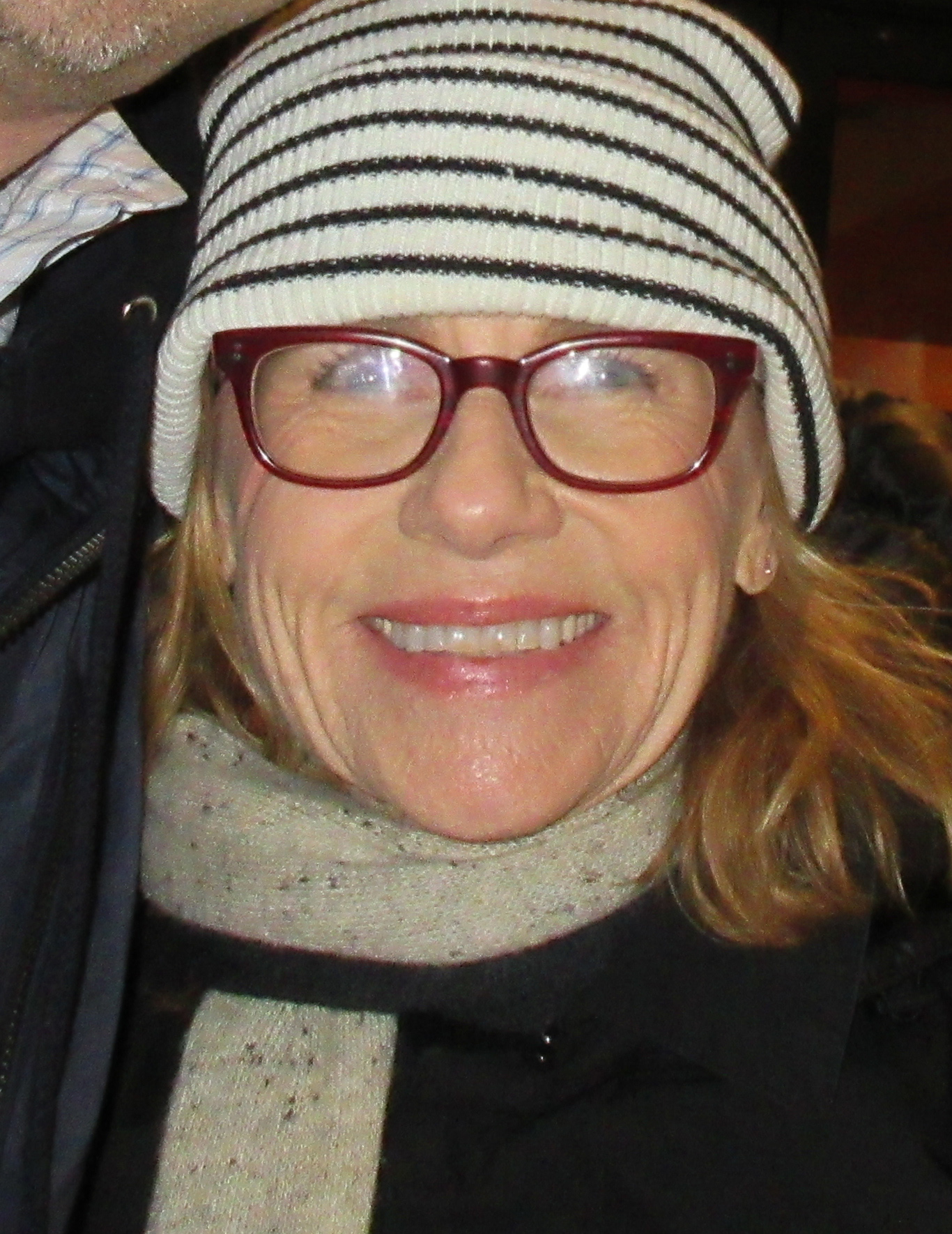
Amy Madigan, Best Supporting Actress winner

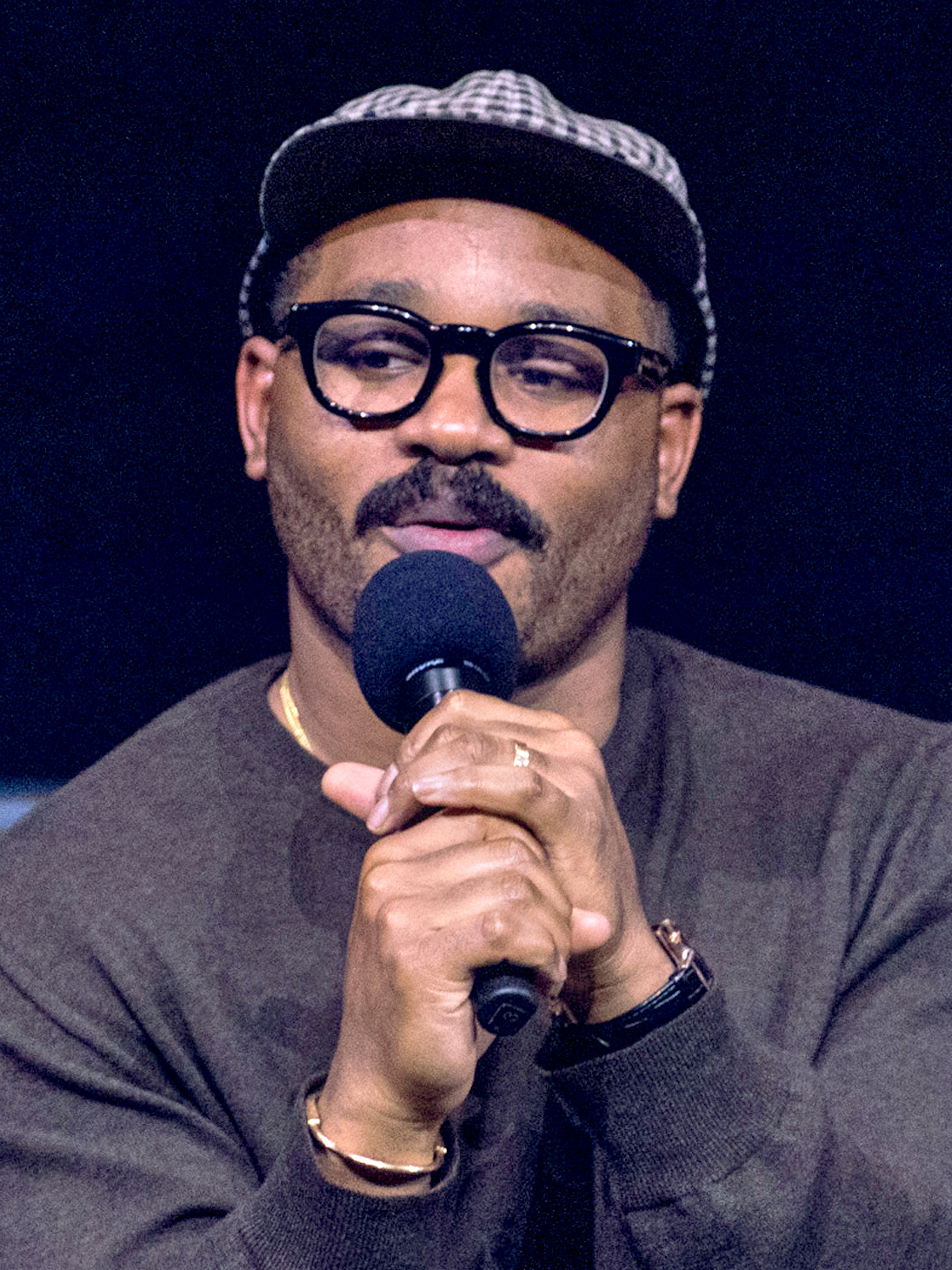
Ryan Coogler, Best Original Screenplay winner

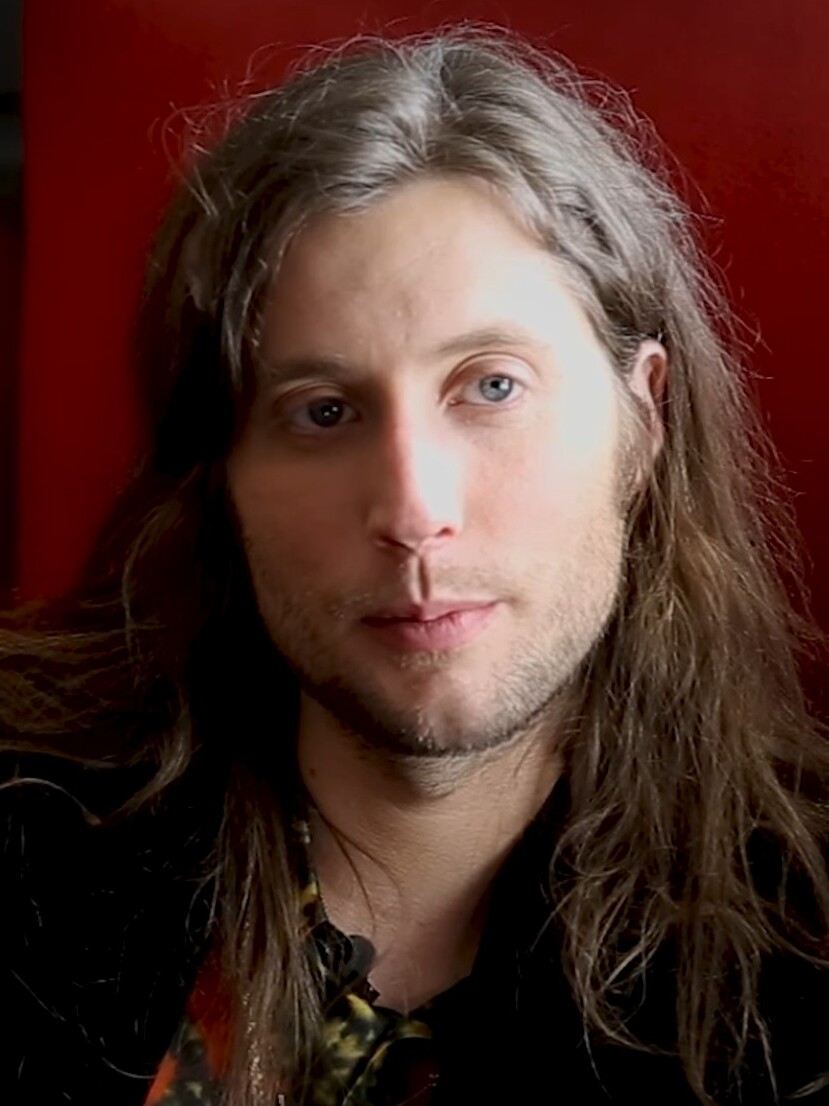
Ludwig Göransson, Best Original Score winner and Best Original Song co-winner

Winners are listed first and in boldface, followed by the runner-ups and nominees.

Best Picture	Best Director
**One Battle After Another**; Runner up: Sinners; Black Bag; Hamnet; It Was Just an Accident; Marty Supreme; Sentimental Value; Sorry, Baby; Train Dreams; Weapons	**Paul Thomas Anderson – One Battle After Another**; Runner up: Ryan Coogler – Sinners; Clint Bentley – Train Dreams; Joachim Trier – Sentimental Value; Chloé Zhao – Hamnet
Best Actor	Best Actress
**Timothée Chalamet – Marty Supreme as Marty Mauser**; Runner up: Michael B. Jordan – Sinners as Elijah "Smoke" Moore / Elias "Stack" Moore; Leonardo DiCaprio – One Battle After Another as Bob Ferguson; Joel Edgerton – Train Dreams as Robert Grainier; Ethan Hawke – Blue Moon as Lorenz Hart	**Jessie Buckley – Hamnet as Agnes Shakespeare**; Runner up: Renate Reinsve – Sentimental Value as Nora Borg; Rose Byrne – If I Had Legs I'd Kick You as Linda; Chase Infiniti – One Battle After Another as Willa Ferguson; Eva Victor – Sorry, Baby as Agnes
Best Supporting Actor	Best Supporting Actress
**Benicio del Toro – One Battle After Another as Sensei Sergio St. Carlos**; Runner up: Jacob Elordi – Frankenstein as The Creature; Sean Penn – One Battle After Another as Col. Steven J. Lockjaw; Adam Sandler – Jay Kelly as Ron Sukenick; Stellan Skarsgård – Sentimental Value as Gustav Borg	**Amy Madigan – Weapons as Gladys**; Runner up: Regina Hall – One Battle After Another as Deandra; Ariana Grande – Wicked: For Good as Galinda "Glinda" Upland; Inga Ibsdotter Lilleaas – Sentimental Value as Agnes Borg Pettersen; Teyana Taylor – One Battle After Another as Perfidia Beverly Hills
Best Original Screenplay	Best Adapted Screenplay
**Sinners – Ryan Coogler**; Runner up: Sentimental Value – Eskil Vogt and Joachim Trier; If I Had Legs I'd Kick You – Mary Bronstein; Marty Supreme – Ronald Bronstein and Josh Safdie; Sorry, Baby – Eva Victor; Weapons – Zach Cregger	**One Battle After Another – Paul Thomas Anderson**; Runner up: Train Dreams – Clint Bentley and Greg Kwedar; Frankenstein – Guillermo del Toro; Hamnet – Chloé Zhao and Maggie O'Farrell; No Other Choice – Park Chan-wook, Lee Kyoung-mi, Don McKellar, and Lee Ja-hye
Best Cinematography	Best Production Design
**Sinners – Autumn Durald Arkapaw**; Runner up: Train Dreams – Adolpho Veloso; F1 – Claudio Miranda; Frankenstein – Dan Laustsen; One Battle After Another – Michael Bauman	**Frankenstein – Tamara Deverell and Shane Vieau**; Runner up: Sinners – Hannah Beachler and Monique Champagne; The Fantastic Four: First Steps – Jille Azis and Kasra Farahani; Hamnet – Fiona Crombie and Alice Felton; Marty Supreme – Jack Fisk and Adam Willis
Best Original Score	Best Original Song
**Sinners – Ludwig Göransson**; Runner up: Train Dreams – Bryce Dessner; F1 – Hans Zimmer; Hamnet – Max Richter; One Battle After Another – Jonny Greenwood	**"I Lied to You" – Raphael Saadiq and Ludwig Göransson (Sinners)**; Runner up: "Golden" – Ejae, Mark Sonnenblick, Ido, 24, and Teddy (KPop Demon Hunters); "Highest 2 Lowest" – Aiyana-Lee Anderson and Nicole Daciana Anderson (Highest 2 Lowest); "Last Time (I Seen the Sun)" – Alice Smith, Miles Caton, and Ludwig Göransson (Sinners); "Train Dreams" – Nick Cave and Bryce Dessner (Train Dreams)
Best Ensemble	Best International Film
**One Battle After Another**; Runner up: Sinners; Black Bag; Marty Supreme; Sentimental Value	**Sentimental Value • Norway**; Runner up: No Other Choice • South Korea; It Was Just an Accident • Iran; The Secret Agent • Brazil; Sirāt • Spain
Best Animated Film	Best Documentary Film
**KPop Demon Hunters**; Runner up: Arco; Elio; Scarlet; Zootopia 2	**The Alabama Solution**; Runner up: The Perfect Neighbor; The Librarians; My Mom Jayne; Predators
Breakthrough Award	Oglethorpe Award for Excellence in Georgia Cinema
**Miles Caton**; Runner up: Chase Infiniti; David Corenswet; Jacobi Jupe; Eva Victor	**Weapons**; Runner up: Bugonia; Meta Take One; The Naked Gun; Sister Salad Days (short); Superman; Swimming Holes (short); Thunderbolts*; Withdrawal; Zora Head: The Life and Scholarship of Valerie Boyd (short)
