= I Lied to You =

Song by Miles Caton

from the album Sinners (Original Motion Picture Soundtrack)
- Released: April 18, 2025
- Recorded: 2024
- Studio: Royal Studios, Memphis, Tennessee
- Genre: Delta blues
- Length: 5:14
- Label: Sony Masterworks
- Songwriters: Raphael Saadiq and Ludwig Göransson
- Producer: Ludwig Göransson

"I Lied to You" is a song by Miles Caton from the soundtrack of the 2025 Ryan Coogler film Sinners. Raphael Saadiq and Ludwig Göransson wrote and produced the track, which was released on April 18, 2025. "I Lied to You" received nominations for Best Original Song at the 98th Academy Awards, Best Original Song at the 83rd Golden Globes, Best Song at the 31st Critics' Choice Awards, and Best Song Written for Visual Media at the 68th Annual Grammy Awards but lost all to "Golden" from KPop Demon Hunters (2025).

== Background ==
Coogler brought Saadiq onto the project about a week before filming started in New Orleans in April 2024. Saadiq had been sitting on the central lyric for years. As a young man of about nineteen, unable to tell a girlfriend the truth, he came up with the phrase "they say the truth hurts, so I lied to you" and thought it belonged in a blues song. He and Göransson wrote and demoed "I Lied to You" in a single session at Göransson's studio, finishing in roughly two hours. They later cut the final version at Royal Studios in Memphis with producer Lawrence "Boo" Mitchell.

Saadiq noted that the humming on the track drew on "devotion-type singing" from Union Baptist Church, where he grew up. Coogler's team wanted Saadiq to put out his own demo as a companion release, but Saadiq turned the idea down, saying listeners should only hear Caton.

== Context in the film ==
In the film, Caton plays Sammie "Preacher Boy" Moore, who performs the song at a juke joint in the Mississippi Delta circa 1932. During the number, spirits from different eras of African-American music begin to materialize in the room. Sammie is a preacher's son who has turned to the blues against his father's wishes, and the lie of the title is his way of sparing his father that knowledge.

== Live performances ==
Caton performed "I Lied to You" with Saadiq and Göransson on Jimmy Kimmel Live! in January 2026.

On March 15, 2026, Caton and Saadiq performed the song at the 98th Academy Awards on a replica juke joint stage. They were joined by Buddy Guy (who plays an older Sammie in the film), Shaboozey, Brittany Howard, Christone "Kingfish" Ingram, Bobby Rush, Alice Smith, Eric Gales, and Misty Copeland. Only two of the five Best Original Song nominees were performed on the broadcast that year, the other being "Golden" from KPop Demon Hunters.

== Accolades ==
Award	Year	Category	Result	Ref.
Academy Awards	2026	Best Original Song	Nominated	
Astra Film Awards	2026	Best Original Song	Nominated	
Black Reel Awards	2026	Outstanding Original Song	Won	
Critics' Choice Awards	2026	Best Original Song	Nominated	
Golden Globes	2026	Best Original Song	Nominated	
Grammy Awards	2026	Best Song Written for Visual Media	Nominated	
Guild of Music Supervisors Awards	2026	Best Song Written and/or Recorded for a Film	Won	
Houston Film Critics Society	2026	Best Original Song	Nominated	
Satellite Awards	2026	Best Original Song	Nominated	
Society of Composers & Lyricists	2026	Outstanding Original Song for a Dramatic or Documentary Visual Media Production	Won	
Georgia Film Critics Association	2025	Best Original Song	Won	
Hollywood Music in Media Awards	2025	Best Original Song – Feature Film	Won	
Hollywood Music in Media Awards	2025	Best Original Song – On-Screen Performance (Film)	Won	
St. Louis Film Critics Association	2025	Best Scene	Won	
World Soundtrack Awards	2025	Best Original Song Written Directly for a Film	Nominated	
