= Houston Film Critics Society Awards 2025 =

Annual US film awards ceremony

19th Houston Film Critics Society Awards
- Date: January 20, 2026
- Location: Midtown Arts & Theater Center Houston, Texas
- Presented by: Houston Film Critics Society
- Website: houstonfilmcritics.com

The 19th Houston Film Critics Society Awards were announced on January 20, 2026, at the Midtown Arts & Theater Center Houston (MATCH) in Texas.

The nominations were announced on January 11, 2026, with Ryan Coogler's period supernatural horror film Sinners leading the nominations with fourteen, followed by One Battle After Another with thirteen. This year, Best Casting was introduced as a new category. Ultimately, Sinners led the awards with a record eight wins, including Best Picture, Best Director (Coogler), and Best Actor (Michael B. Jordan). "Sinners' landmark success should not be seen as an aberration in cinema, but instead remind us that taking creative risks allow for bold filmmaking and new visions," said Travis Leamons, president of the organization.

The nominees for the Texas Independent Film Award were announced on December 18, 2025.

== Winners and nominees ==
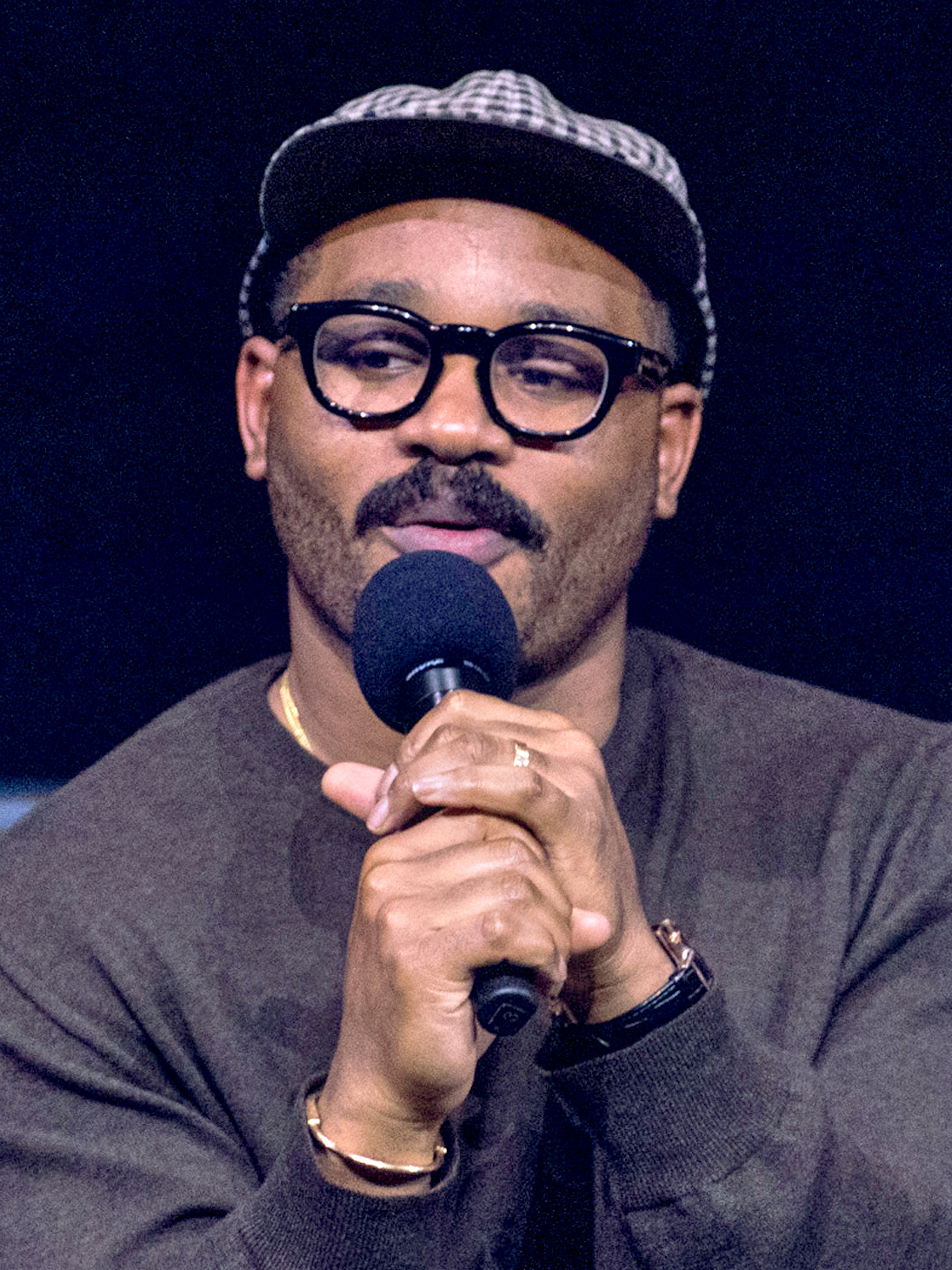
Ryan Coogler, Best Director and Best Screenplay winner

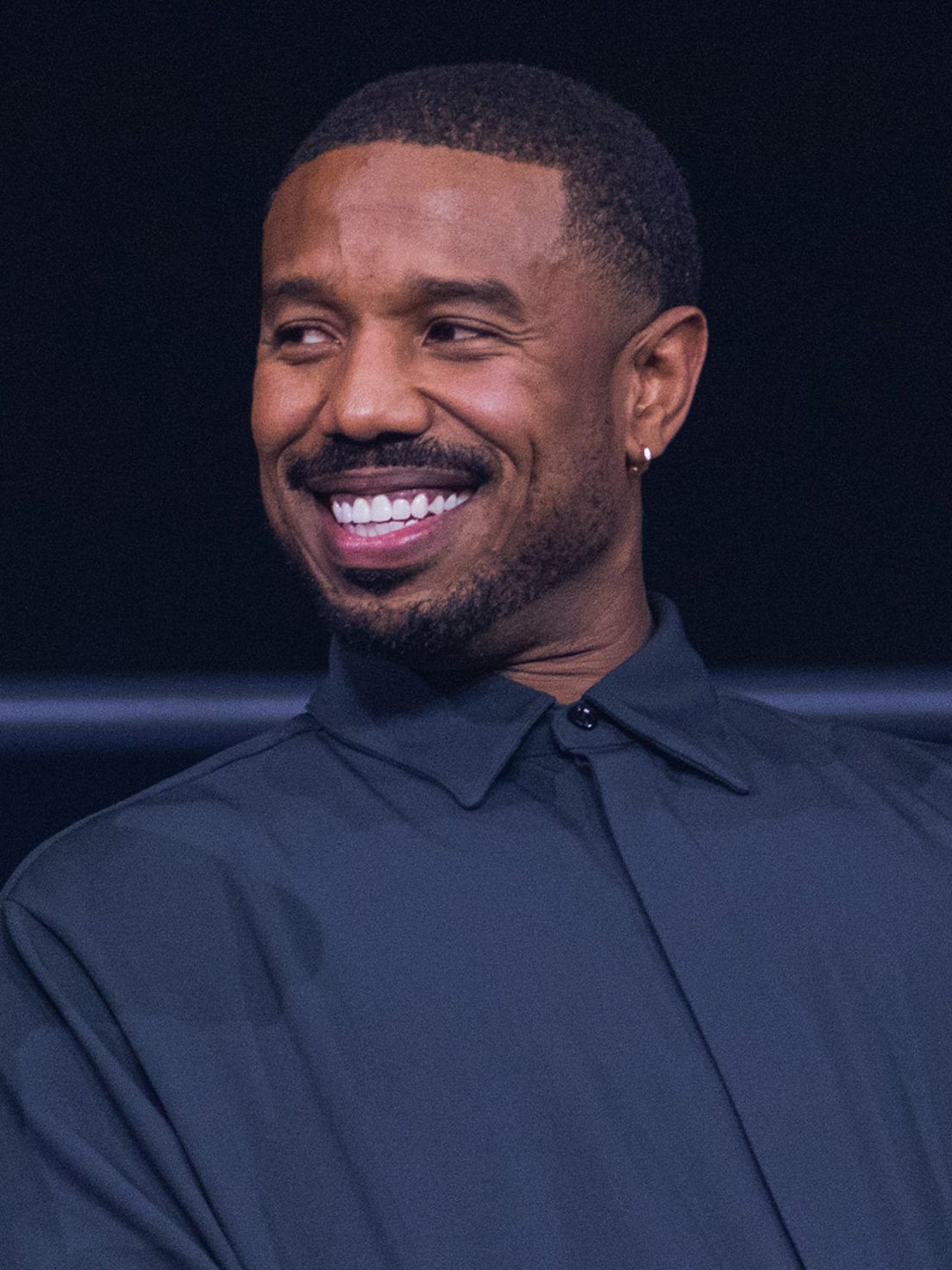
Michael B. Jordan, Best Actor winner

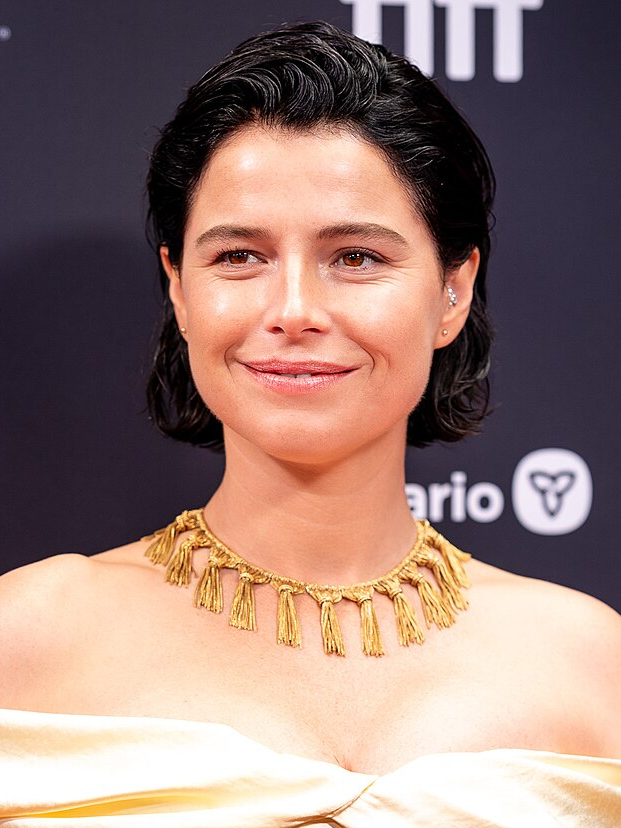
Jessie Buckley, Best Actress winner

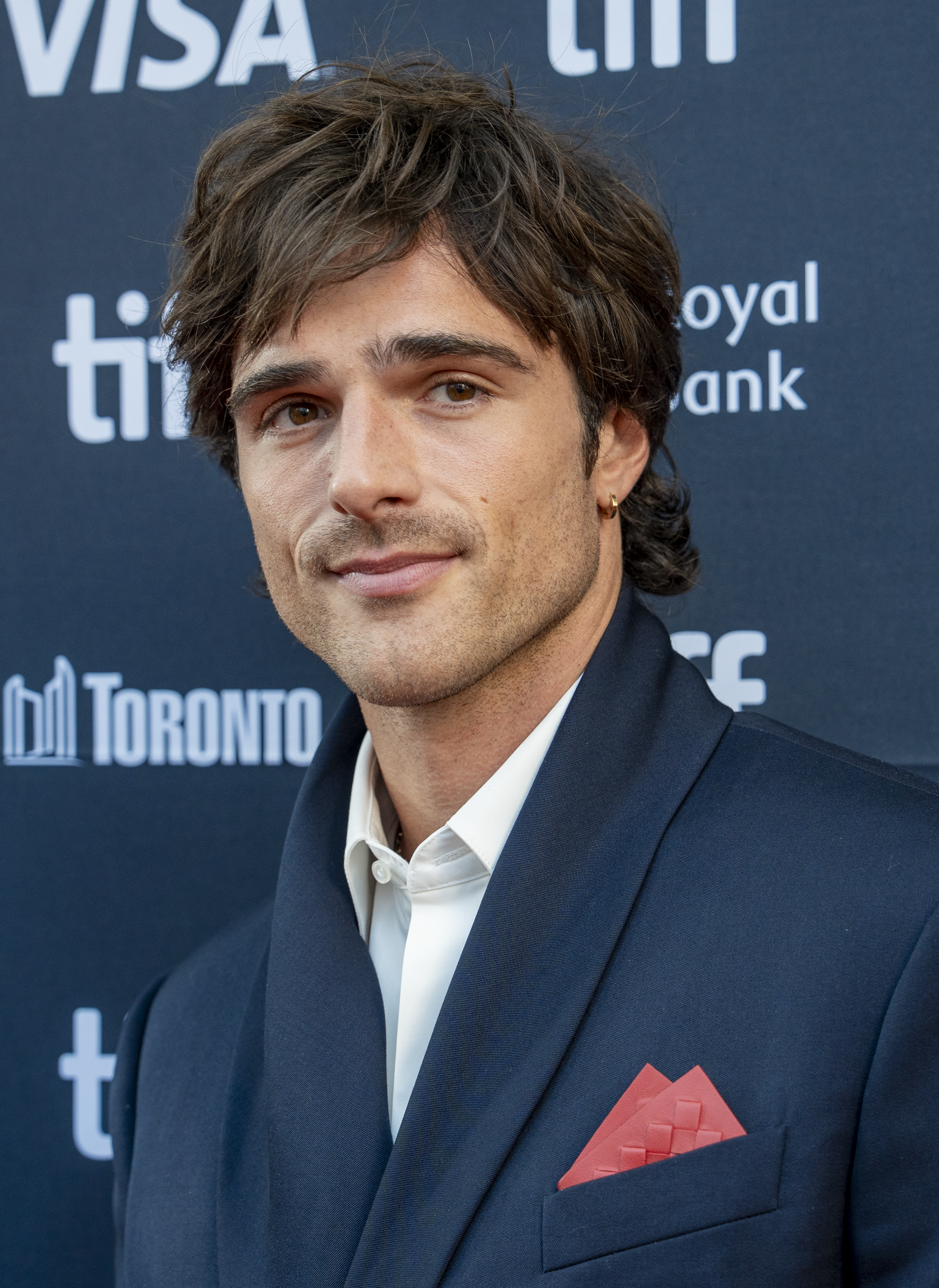
Jacob Elordi, Best Supporting Actor winner

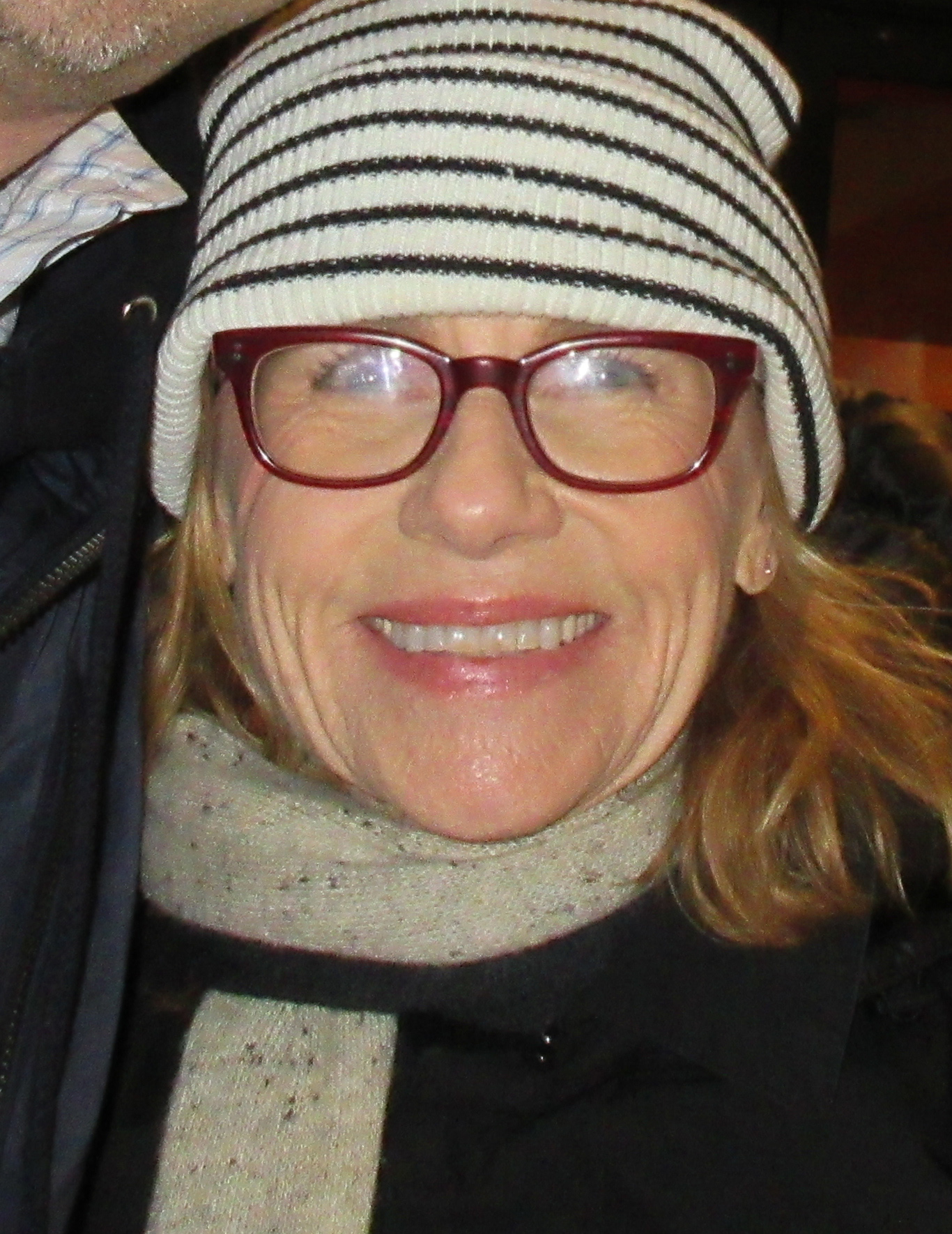
Amy Madigan, Best Supporting Actress winner

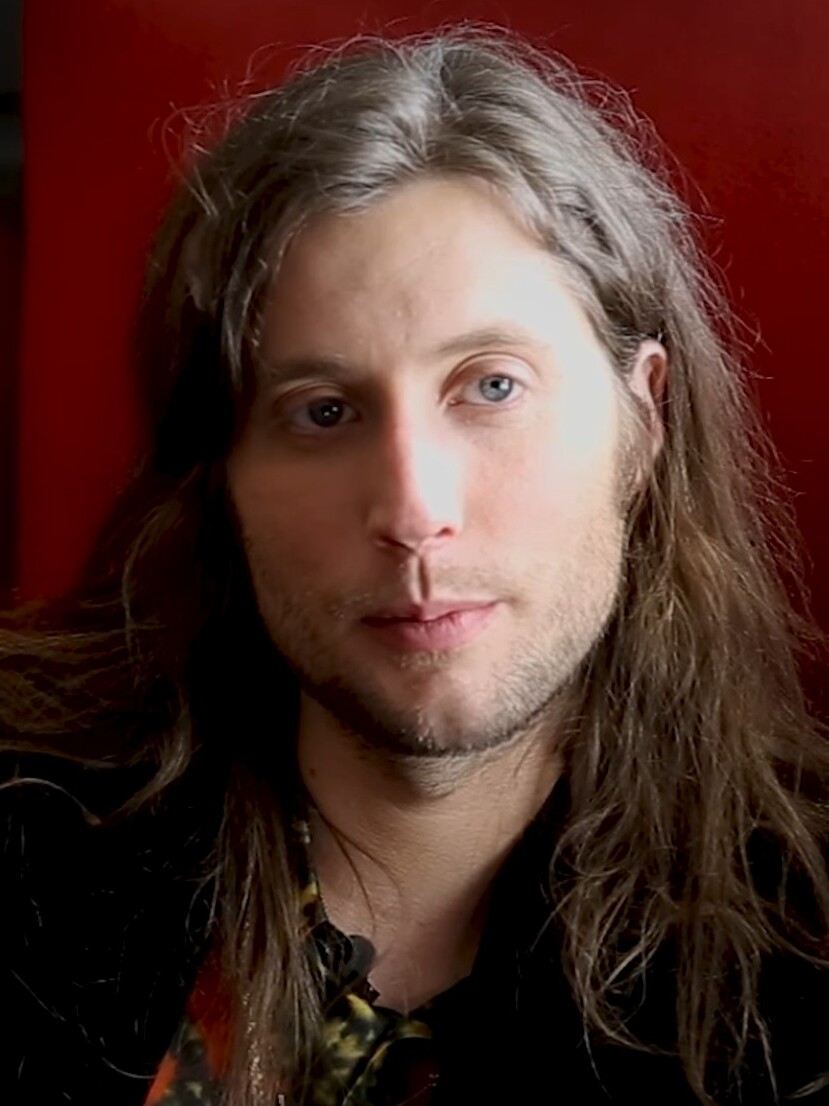
Ludwig Göransson, Best Original Score winner

Winners are listed first and highlighted with boldface.

Best Picture	Best Director
**Sinners**; Bugonia; F1; Frankenstein; Hamnet; Marty Supreme; One Battle After Another; The Secret Agent; Sentimental Value; Train Dreams; Weapons	**Ryan Coogler – Sinners**; Paul Thomas Anderson – One Battle After Another; Guillermo del Toro – Frankenstein; Josh Safdie – Marty Supreme; Chloé Zhao – Hamnet
Best Actor	Best Actress
**Michael B. Jordan – Sinners as Elijah "Smoke" Moore / Elias "Stack" Moore**; Timothée Chalamet – Marty Supreme as Marty Mauser; Leonardo DiCaprio – One Battle After Another as Bob Ferguson; Ethan Hawke – Blue Moon as Lorenz Hart; Wagner Moura – The Secret Agent as Marcelo Alves / Armando Solimões / Fernando Solimões	**Jessie Buckley – Hamnet as Agnes Shakespeare**; Rose Byrne – If I Had Legs I'd Kick You as Linda; Kate Hudson – Song Sung Blue as Claire Sardina; Chase Infiniti – One Battle After Another as Willa Ferguson; Renate Reinsve – Sentimental Value as Nora Borg; Emma Stone – Bugonia as Michelle Fuller
Best Supporting Actor	Best Supporting Actress
**Jacob Elordi – Frankenstein as The Creature**; Benicio del Toro – One Battle After Another as Sensei Sergio St. Carlos; Delroy Lindo – Sinners as Delta Slim; Paul Mescal – Hamnet as William Shakespeare; Sean Penn – One Battle After Another as Col. Steven J. Lockjaw; Stellan Skarsgård – Sentimental Value as Gustav Borg	**Amy Madigan – Weapons as Gladys**; Ariana Grande – Wicked: For Good as Galinda "Glinda" Upland; Inga Ibsdotter Lilleaas – Sentimental Value as Agnes Borg Pettersen; Wunmi Mosaku – Sinners as Annie; Teyana Taylor – One Battle After Another as Perfidia Beverly Hills
Best Screenplay	Best Animated Feature
**Sinners – Ryan Coogler**; Marty Supreme – Ronald Bronstein and Josh Safdie; One Battle After Another – Paul Thomas Anderson; Sentimental Value – Eskil Vogt and Joachim Trier; Wake Up Dead Man – Rian Johnson	**KPop Demon Hunters**; Arco; The Bad Guys 2; Ne Zha 2; Zootopia 2
Best Documentary Feature	Best Foreign Language Feature
**The Perfect Neighbor**; The Alabama Solution; Cover-Up; My Mom Jayne; Orwell: 2+2=5	**Sentimental Value**; It Was Just an Accident; No Other Choice; The Secret Agent; Sirāt
Best Original Score	Best Original Song
**Sinners – Ludwig Göransson**; F1 – Hans Zimmer; Frankenstein – Alexandre Desplat; Marty Supreme – Daniel Lopatin; One Battle After Another – Jonny Greenwood	**"Golden" – KPop Demon Hunters**; "I Lied to You" – Sinners; "Last Time (I Seen the Sun)" – Sinners; "Our Love" – The Ballad of Wallis Island; "Train Dreams" – Train Dreams
Best Cinematography	Best Visual Effects
**Sinners – Autumn Durald Arkapaw**; F1 – Claudio Miranda; Frankenstein – Dan Laustsen; One Battle After Another – Michael Bauman; Train Dreams – Adolpho Veloso	**Avatar: Fire and Ash**; F1; Frankenstein; Sinners; Superman
Best Casting	Best Ensemble
**Sinners – Francine Maisler**; Frankenstein – Robin D. Cook; Hamnet – Nina Gold; Marty Supreme – Jennifer Venditti; One Battle After Another – Cassandra Kulukundis	**Sinners**; Marty Supreme; One Battle After Another; Sentimental Value; Wake Up Dead Man
Best Stunt Coordination Team	Texas Independent Film Award
**Mission: Impossible – The Final Reckoning**; Ballerina; F1; One Battle After Another; Sinners	**The Librarians – Kim A. Snyder**; Ick – Joseph Kahn; Luv Ya Bum! – Sam Wainwright Douglas, David Hartstein, and Andrew Alden Miller; Selena y Los Dinos – Isabel Castro; The Senior – Rod Lurie
