= Houston Film Critics Society Awards 2007 =

Annual US film awards ceremony

1st Houston Film Critics Society Awards
- Date: January 3, 2008
- Location: Houston, Texas
- Country: United States
- Presented by: Houston Film Critics Society
- Website: houstonfilmcritics.com/awards

The 1st Houston Film Critics Society Awards were announced on January 3, 2008. The awards are presented annually by the Houston Film Critics Society (HFCS) based in Houston, Texas. In addition to the category awards, the HFCS named filmmakers Joel and Ethan Coen as "honorary Texans" for their work on No Country for Old Men. This is the only year to date that the HFCS has presented an award in the "Best Performance by an Ensemble Cast" category.

== Top 10 Films ==
1. No Country for Old Men
2. Juno
3. Atonement
4. Michael Clayton
5. Into the Wild
6. Sweeney Todd: The Demon Barber of Fleet Street
7. The Diving Bell and the Butterfly (Le scaphandre et le papillon)
8. Before the Devil Knows You're Dead
9. Charlie Wilson's War
10. I'm Not There

== Winners and nominees ==
Winners are listed first and highlighted with boldface

| Best Picture | Best Foreign Language Film |
|---|---|
| **No Country for Old Men** Atonement Juno Into the Wild Michael Clayton | **The Diving Bell and the Butterfly (Le scaphandre et le papillon)** • **France/United States** La Vie en rose • France Lust, Caution • China Persepolis • France The Kite Runner • Afghanistan |
| Best Performance by an Actor in a Leading Role | Best Performance by an Actress in a Leading Role |
| **Daniel Day-Lewis** - **There Will Be Blood** Casey Affleck - Gone Baby Gone George Clooney - Michael Clayton Emile Hirsch - Into the Wild Viggo Mortensen - Eastern Promises | **Julie Christie** - **Away from Her** Amy Adams - Enchanted Marion Cotillard - La Vie En Rose Angelina Jolie - A Mighty Heart Laura Linney - The Savages Elliot Page (Note: Credited as Ellen Page; Juno was released before Page came out as transgender.) - Juno |
| Best Performance by an Actor in a Supporting Role | Best Performance by an Actress in a Supporting Role |
| **Javier Bardem** - **No Country for Old Men** Casey Affleck - The Assassination of Jesse James by the Coward Robert Ford Hal Holbrook - Into the Wild Philip Seymour Hoffman - Charlie Wilson's War Tom Wilkinson - Michael Clayton | **Amy Ryan** - **Gone Baby Gone** Cate Blanchett - I'm Not There Catherine Keener - Into the Wild Kelly Macdonald - No Country for Old Men Tilda Swinton - Michael Clayton |
| Best Direction of a Motion Picture | Best Cinematography |
| **Tim Burton** - **Sweeney Todd: The Demon Barber of Fleet Street** Joel Coen and Ethan Coen - No Country for Old Men Sidney Lumet - Before the Devil Knows You're Dead Sean Penn - Into the Wild | **The Assassination of Jesse James by the Coward Robert Ford** - **Roger Deakins** Atonement - Seamus McGarvey Into the Wild - Éric Gautier No Country for Old Men - Roger Deakins Sweeney Todd: The Demon Barber of Fleet Street - Dariusz Wolski |
| Best Animated Feature Film | Best Documentary Film |
| **Ratatouille** Bee Movie Beowulf Persepolis The Simpsons Movie | **The King of Kong: A Fistful of Quarters** In the Shadow of the Moon Lake of Fire No End in Sight Sicko War Dance |
| Best Original Score | Best Original Song |
| **Atonement** - **Dario Marianelli** 3:10 to Yuma - Marco Beltrami Into the Wild - Michael Brook, Kaki King & Eddie Vedder Lust, Caution - Alexandre Desplat Once - Glen Hansard & Markéta Irglová There Will Be Blood - Jonny Greenwood | **"Falling Slowly"** - **Once** "Baby Don't You Cry" - Waitress "Happy Working Song" - Enchanted "If You Want Me" - Once "Pop! Goes My Heart" - Music and Lyrics "Walk Hard" - Walk Hard: The Dewey Cox Story |
| Best Screenplay | Best Performance by an Ensemble Cast |
| **Juno** - **Diablo Cody** Atonement - Christopher Hampton No Country for Old Men - Joel Coen and Ethan Coen The Savages - Tamara Jenkins Michael Clayton - Tony Gilroy | **Hairspray** 3:10 to Yuma Before the Devil Knows You're Dead Into the Wild Michael Clayton No Country for Old Men |
