= Houston Film Critics Society Award for Best Original Score =

Annual US film award

The Houston Film Critics Society Award for Best Original Score is an annual award given by the Houston Film Critics Society.

== Winners ==
=== 2000s ===
Year	Winner	Composer(s)
2007	Atonement	Dario Marianelli
2007	3:10 to Yuma	Marco Beltrami
2007	Into the Wild	Michael Brook, Kaki King, and Eddie Vedder
2007	Lust, Caution	Alexandre Desplat
2007	Once	Glen Hansard and Markéta Irglová
2007	There Will Be Blood	Jonny Greenwood
2008	Miracle at St. Anna	Terence Blanchard
2008	The Curious Case of Benjamin Button	Alexandre Desplat
2008	The Dark Knight	Hans Zimmer and James Newton Howard
2008	Revolutionary Road	Thomas Newman
2008	Slumdog Millionaire	A. R. Rahman
2009	Up	Michael Giacchino
2009	Avatar	James Horner
2009	Fantastic Mr. Fox	Alexandre Desplat
2009	The Informant!	Marvin Hamlisch
2009	Sherlock Holmes	Hans Zimmer

=== 2010s ===
Year	Winner	Composer(s)
2010	Inception	Hans Zimmer
2010	127 Hours	A. R. Rahman
2010	How to Train Your Dragon	John Powell
2010	The Social Network	Trent Reznor and Atticus Ross
2010	True Grit	Carter Burwell
2011	The Artist	Ludovic Bource
2011	The Adventures of Tintin	John Williams
2011	Harry Potter and the Deathly Hallows – Part 2	Alexandre Desplat
2011	Shame	Harry Escott
2011	War Horse	John Williams
2012	Cloud Atlas	Reinhold Heil, Johnny Klimek, and Tom Tykwer
2012	Beasts of the Southern Wild	Dan Romer and Benh Zeitlin
2012	Hitchcock	Danny Elfman
2012	Life of Pi	Mychael Danna
2012	Lincoln	John Williams
2012	The Master	Jonny Greenwood
2012	Skyfall	Thomas Newman
2013	Gravity	Steven Price
2013	12 Years a Slave	Hans Zimmer
2013	Her	Will Butler and Owen Pallett
2013	Man of Steel	Hans Zimmer
2013	Saving Mr. Banks	Thomas Newman
2014	The Grand Budapest Hotel	Alexandre Desplat
2014	Birdman	Antonio Sánchez
2014	The Imitation Game	Alexandre Desplat
2014	Interstellar	Hans Zimmer
2014	The Theory of Everything	Jóhann Jóhannsson
2015	The Hateful Eight	Ennio Morricone
2015	Inside Out	Michael Giacchino
2015	Mad Max: Fury Road	Junkie XL
2015	The Revenant	Ryuichi Sakamoto, Alva Noto, and Bryce Dessner
2015	Steve Jobs	Daniel Pemberton
2016	La La Land	Justin Hurwitz
2016	Arrival	Jóhann Jóhannsson
2016	Jackie	Mica Levi
2016	Moonlight	Nicholas Britell
2016	Nocturnal Animals	Abel Korzeniowski
2017	The Shape of Water	Alexandre Desplat
2017	Blade Runner 2049	Benjamin Wallfisch and Hans Zimmer
2017	Dunkirk	Hans Zimmer
2017	The Post	John Williams
2017	War for the Planet of the Apes	Michael Giacchino
2018	If Beale Street Could Talk	Nicholas Britell
2018	Black Panther	Ludwig Göransson
2018	First Man	Justin Hurwitz
2018	Isle of Dogs	Alexandre Desplat
2018	Suspiria	Thom Yorke
2019	1917	Thomas Newman
2019	Joker	Hildur Guðnadóttir
2019	Little Women	Alexandre Desplat
2019	Marriage Story	Randy Newman
2019	Us	Michael Abels

=== 2020s ===
Year	Winner	Composer(s)
2020	Soul	Jon Batiste, Trent Reznor and Atticus Ross
2020	Mank	Trent Reznor and Atticus Ross
2020	The Midnight Sky	Alexandre Desplat
2020	News of the World	James Newton Howard
2020	Tenet	Ludwig Göransson
2021	Dune	Hans Zimmer
2021	The Power of the Dog	Jonny Greenwood
2021	The French Dispatch	Alexandre Desplat
2021	The Harder They Fall	Jeymes Samuel
2021	Spencer	Jonny Greenwood
