= Houston Film Critics Society Award for Best Actor =

American film society award

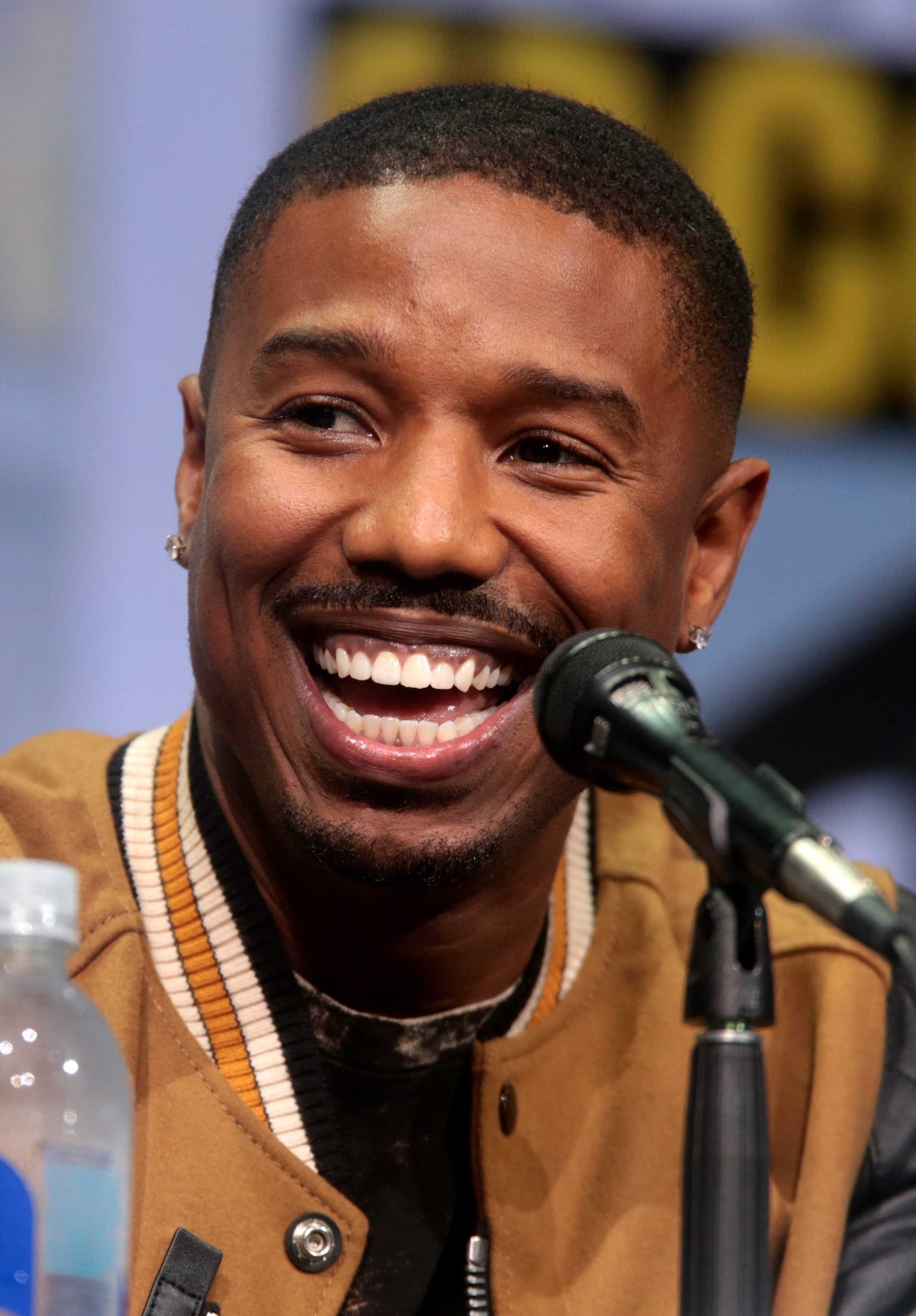
- The 2025 recipient: Michael B. Jordan
- Awarded for: Best Performance by an Actor in a Leading Role
- Country: United States
- Presented by: Houston Film Critics Society
- First award: Daniel Day-Lewis; There Will Be Blood (2007)
- Currently held by: Michael B. Jordan; Sinners (2025)
- Website: houstonfilmcritics.org

The Houston Film Critics Society Award for Best Actor is an annual award given by the Houston Film Critics Society.

== Winners ==
- † = Winner of the Academy Award for Best Actor
- ‡ = Nominated of the Academy Award for Best Actor

=== 2000s ===
| Year | Winner and nominees | Film | Role |
|---|---|---|---|
| 2007 | Daniel Day-Lewis † | There Will Be Blood | Daniel Plainview |
| 2007 | Casey Affleck | Gone Baby Gone | Patrick Kenzie |
| 2007 | George Clooney ‡ | Michael Clayton | Michael Clayton |
| 2007 | Emile Hirsch | Into the Wild | Chris McCandless |
| 2007 | Viggo Mortensen ‡ | Eastern Promises | Nikolai Luzhin |
| 2008 | Sean Penn † | Milk | Harvey Milk |
| 2008 | Leonardo DiCaprio | Revolutionary Road | Frank Wheeler |
| 2008 | Richard Jenkins ‡ | The Visitor | Walter Vale |
| 2008 | Frank Langella ‡ | Frost/Nixon | Richard Nixon |
| 2008 | Brad Pitt ‡ | The Curious Case of Benjamin Button | Benjamin Button |
| 2008 | Mickey Rourke ‡ | The Wrestler | Randy "The Ram" Robinson |
| 2009 | George Clooney ‡ | Up in the Air | Ryan Bingham |
| 2009 | Jeff Bridges † | Crazy Heart | Bad Blake |
| 2009 | Morgan Freeman ‡ | Invictus | Nelson Mandela |
| 2009 | Viggo Mortensen | The Road | Man |
| 2009 | Jeremy Renner ‡ | The Hurt Locker | Sergeant First Class William James |

=== 2010s ===
| Year | Winner and nominees | Film | Role |
|---|---|---|---|
| 2010 | Jesse Eisenberg ‡ | The Social Network | Mark Zuckerberg |
| 2010 | Jeff Bridges ‡ | True Grit | Rooster Cogburn |
| 2010 | Robert Duvall | Get Low | Felix Bush |
| 2010 | Colin Firth † | The King's Speech | King George VI |
| 2010 | James Franco ‡ | 127 Hours | Aron Ralston |
| 2011 | Michael Fassbender | Shame | Brandon Sullivan |
| 2011 | George Clooney ‡ | The Descendants | Matt King |
| 2011 | Jean Dujardin † | The Artist | George Valentin |
| 2011 | Brad Pitt ‡ | Moneyball | Billy Beane |
| 2011 | Michael Shannon | Take Shelter | Curtis LaForche |
| 2012 | Daniel Day-Lewis † | Lincoln | Abraham Lincoln |
| 2012 | John Hawkes | The Sessions | Mark O'Brien |
| 2012 | Hugh Jackman ‡ | Les Misérables | Jean Valjean |
| 2012 | Joaquin Phoenix ‡ | The Master | Freddie Quell |
| 2012 | Denzel Washington ‡ | Flight | Whip Whitaker |
| 2013 | Chiwetel Ejiofor ‡ | 12 Years a Slave | Solomon Northup |
| 2013 | Bruce Dern ‡ | Nebraska | Woody Grant |
| 2013 | Christian Bale ‡ | American Hustle | Irving Rosenfeld |
| 2013 | Matthew McConaughey † | Dallas Buyers Club | Ron Woodroof |
| 2013 | Mads Mikkelsen | The Hunt | Lucas |
| 2013 | Robert Redford | All Is Lost | Our Man |
| 2014 | Jake Gyllenhaal | Nightcrawler | Louis "Lou" Bloom |
| 2014 | Benedict Cumberbatch ‡ | The Imitation Game | Alan Turing |
| 2014 | Tom Hardy | Locke | Ivan Locke |
| 2014 | Michael Keaton ‡ | Birdman | Riggan Thomson / Birdman |
| 2014 | Eddie Redmayne † | The Theory of Everything | Stephen Hawking |
| 2015 | Michael Fassbender ‡ | Steve Jobs | Steve Jobs |
| 2015 | Bryan Cranston ‡ | Trumbo | Dalton Trumbo |
| 2015 | Matt Damon ‡ | The Martian | Mark Watney |
| 2015 | Leonardo DiCaprio † | The Revenant | Hugh Glass |
| 2015 | Tom Hardy | Legend | Ronald "Ronnie" Kray & Reginald "Reggie" Kray |
| 2016 | Casey Affleck † | Manchester by the Sea | Lee Chandler |
| 2016 | Andrew Garfield ‡ | Hacksaw Ridge | Desmond T. Doss |
| 2016 | Ryan Gosling ‡ | La La Land | Sebastian Wilder |
| 2016 | Jake Gyllenhaal | Nocturnal Animals | Tony Hastings/Edward Sheffield |
| 2016 | Viggo Mortensen ‡ | Captain Fantastic | Ben Cash |
| 2016 | Denzel Washington ‡ | Fences | Troy Maxson |
| 2017 | James Franco | The Disaster Artist | Tommy Wiseau |
| 2017 | Timothée Chalamet ‡ | Call Me by Your Name | Elio Perlman |
| 2017 | Daniel Kaluuya ‡ | Get Out | Chris Washington |
| 2017 | Robert Pattinson | Good Time | Constantine "Connie" Nikas |
| 2017 | Andy Serkis | War for the Planet of the Apes | Caesar |
| 2018 | Christian Bale ‡ | Vice | Dick Cheney |
| 2018 | Bradley Cooper ‡ | A Star Is Born | Jackson Maine |
| 2018 | Ethan Hawke | First Reformed | Ernst Toller |
| 2018 | Rami Malek † | Bohemian Rhapsody | Freddie Mercury |
| 2018 | Viggo Mortensen ‡ | Green Book | Frank "Tony Lip" Vallelonga |
| 2019 | Adam Driver ‡ | Marriage Story | Charlie Barber |
| 2019 | Leonardo DiCaprio ‡ | Once Upon a Time in Hollywood | Rick Dalton |
| 2019 | Eddie Murphy | Dolemite Is My Name | Rudy Ray Moore |
| 2019 | Joaquin Phoenix † | Joker | Arthur Fleck / Joker |
| 2019 | Adam Sandler | Uncut Gems | Howard Ratner |

=== 2020s ===
| Year | Winner and nominees | Film | Role |
|---|---|---|---|
| 2020 | Riz Ahmed ‡ | Sound of Metal | Ruben |
| 2020 | Chadwick Boseman ‡ | Ma Rainey's Black Bottom | Levee Green |
| 2020 | Anthony Hopkins † | The Father | Anthony |
| 2020 | Delroy Lindo | Da 5 Bloods | Paul |
| 2020 | Steven Yeun ‡ | Minari | Jacob Yi |
| 2021 | Benedict Cumberbatch ‡ | The Power of the Dog | Phil Burbank |
| 2021 | Peter Dinklage | Cyrano | Cyrano de Bergerac |
| 2021 | Andrew Garfield ‡ | tick, tick... BOOM! | Jonathan Larson |
| 2021 | Will Smith † | King Richard | Richard Williams |
| 2021 | Denzel Washington ‡ | The Tragedy of Macbeth | Lord Macbeth |
| 2022 | Colin Farrell ‡ | The Banshees of Inisherin | Pádraic Súilleabháin |
| 2022 | Austin Butler ‡ | Elvis | Elvis Presley |
| 2022 | Tom Cruise | Top Gun: Maverick | Captain Pete "Maverick" Mitchell |
| 2022 | Brendan Fraser † | The Whale | Charlie |
| 2022 | Jeremy Pope | The Inspection | Ellis French |
| 2023 | Paul Giamatti ‡ | The Holdovers | Paul Hunham |
| 2023 | Leonardo DiCaprio | Killers of the Flower Moon | Ernest Burkhart |
| 2023 | Cillian Murphy † | Oppenheimer | J. Robert Oppenheimer |
| 2023 | Andrew Scott | All of Us Strangers | Adam |
| 2023 | Jeffrey Wright ‡ | American Fiction | Thelonious "Monk" Ellison |
| 2024 | Ralph Fiennes ‡ | Conclave | Cardinal Thomas Lawrence |
| 2024 | Adrien Brody † | The Brutalist | László Tóth |
| 2024 | Timothée Chalamet ‡ | A Complete Unknown | Bob Dylan |
| 2024 | Colman Domingo ‡ | Sing Sing | John "Divine G" Whitfield |
| 2024 | Hugh Grant | Heretic | Mr. Reed |
| 2025 | Michael B. Jordan ‡ | Sinners | Elijah "Smoke" Moore / Elias "Stack" Moore |
| 2025 | Timothée Chalamet ‡ | Marty Supreme | Marty Mauser |
| 2025 | Leonardo DiCaprio ‡ | One Battle After Another | Bob Ferguson |
| 2025 | Ethan Hawke ‡ | Blue Moon | Lorenz Hart |
| 2025 | Wagner Moura ‡ | The Secret Agent | Marcelo Alves / Armando Solimões / Fernando Solimões |
