= Houston Film Critics Society Award for Best Director =

Annual US film award

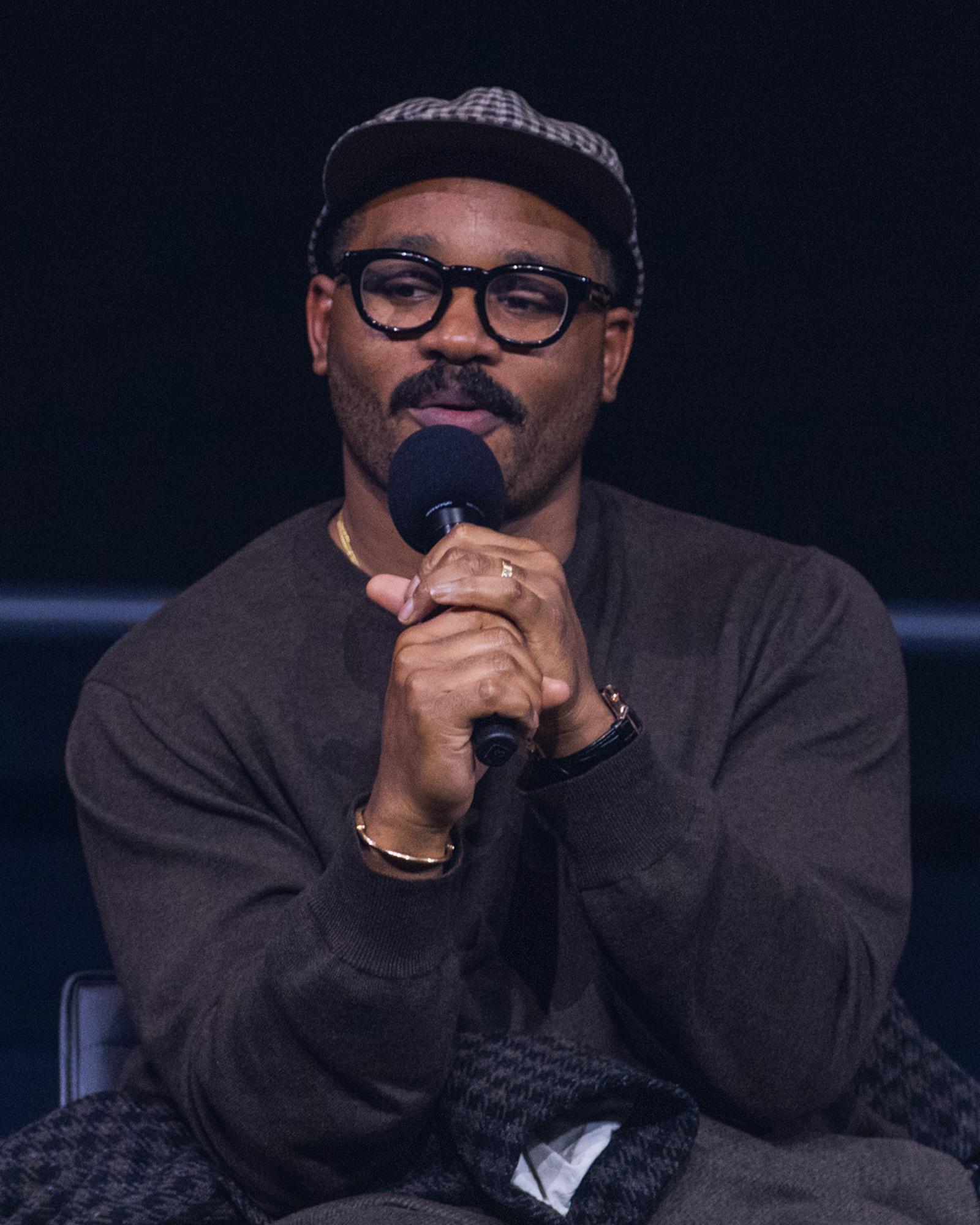
- The 2025 recipient: Ryan Coogler
- Awarded for: Best Director
- Country: United States
- Presented by: Houston Film Critics Society
- First award: Tim Burton; Sweeney Todd: The Demon Barber of Fleet Street (2007)
- Currently held by: Ryan Coogler; Sinners (2025)
- Website: houstonfilmcritics.org

The Houston Film Critics Society Award for Best Director is an annual award given by the Houston Film Critics Society.

== Winners ==
=== 2000s ===
Year	Winner and nominees	Film
2007	Tim Burton	Sweeney Todd: The Demon Barber of Fleet Street
2007	Joel Coen and Ethan Coen	No Country for Old Men
2007	Sidney Lumet	Before the Devil Knows You're Dead
2007	Sean Penn	Into the Wild
2008	Danny Boyle	Slumdog Millionaire
2008	David Fincher	The Curious Case of Benjamin Button
2008	Ron Howard	Frost/Nixon
2008	Christopher Nolan	The Dark Knight
2008	Gus Van Sant	Milk
2009	Kathryn Bigelow	The Hurt Locker
2009	James Cameron	Avatar
2009	Lee Daniels	Precious: Based on the Novel "Push" by Sapphire
2009	Clint Eastwood	Invictus
2009	Jason Reitman	Up in the Air
2009	Quentin Tarantino	Inglourious Basterds

=== 2010s ===
Year	Winner and nominees	Film
2010	David Fincher	The Social Network
2010	Darren Aronofsky	Black Swan
2010	Danny Boyle	127 Hours
2010	Joel Coen and Ethan Coen	True Grit
2010	Christopher Nolan	Inception
2011	Nicolas Winding Refn	Drive
2011	Woody Allen	Midnight in Paris
2011	Michel Hazanavicius	The Artist
2011	Terrence Malick	The Tree of Life
2011	Alexander Payne	The Descendants
2012	Ben Affleck	Argo
2012	Kathryn Bigelow	Zero Dark Thirty
2012	Tom Hooper	Les Misérables
2012	Steven Spielberg	Lincoln
2012	Quentin Tarantino	Django Unchained
2013	Alfonso Cuarón	Gravity
2013	Joel Coen and Ethan Coen	Inside Llewyn Davis
2013	Paul Greengrass	Captain Phillips
2013	Steve McQueen	12 Years a Slave
2013	Alexander Payne	Nebraska
2014	Richard Linklater	Boyhood
2014	Paul Thomas Anderson	Inherent Vice
2014	Wes Anderson	The Grand Budapest Hotel
2014	Damien Chazelle	Whiplash
2014	Alejandro G. Iñárritu	Birdman
2015	Alejandro G. Iñárritu	The Revenant
2015	Lenny Abrahamson	Room
2015	Tom McCarthy	Spotlight
2015	George Miller	Mad Max: Fury Road
2015	Ridley Scott	The Martian
2016	Damien Chazelle	La La Land
2016	Barry Jenkins	Moonlight
2016	Kenneth Lonergan	Manchester by the Sea
2016	David Mackenzie	Hell or High Water
2016	Denis Villeneuve	Arrival
2017	Greta Gerwig	Lady Bird
2017	Guillermo del Toro	The Shape of Water
2017	Christopher Nolan	Dunkirk
2017	Jordan Peele	Get Out
2017	Steven Spielberg	The Post
2018	Alfonso Cuarón	Roma
2018	Bradley Cooper	A Star Is Born
2018	Barry Jenkins	If Beale Street Could Talk
2018	Yorgos Lanthimos	The Favourite
2018	Adam McKay	Vice
2019	Bong Joon-ho	Parasite
2019	Sam Mendes	1917
2019	Martin Scorsese	The Irishman
2019	Quentin Tarantino	Once Upon a Time in Hollywood
2019	Lulu Wang	The Farewell

=== 2020s ===
Year	Winner and nominees	Film
2020	Chloé Zhao	Nomadland
2020	Lee Isaac Chung	Minari
2020	Emerald Fennell	Promising Young Woman
2020	Regina King	One Night in Miami...
2020	Darius Marder	Sound of Metal
2020	Aaron Sorkin	The Trial of the Chicago 7
2021	Jane Campion	The Power of the Dog
2021	Paul Thomas Anderson	Licorice Pizza
2021	Kenneth Branagh	Belfast
2021	Guillermo del Toro	Nightmare Alley
2021	Denis Villeneuve	Dune
2022	Daniel Kwan; Daniel Scheinert	Everything Everywhere All at Once
2022	Martin McDonagh	The Banshees of Inisherin
2022	Baz Luhrmann	Elvis
2022	Steven Spielberg	The Fabelmans
2022	Todd Field	TÁR
2022	Sarah Polley	Women Talking
2023	Christopher Nolan	Oppenheimer
2023	Greta Gerwig	Barbie
2023	Yorgos Lanthimos	Poor Things
2023	Alexander Payne	The Holdovers
2023	Martin Scorsese	Killers of the Flower Moon
2024	Brady Corbet	The Brutalist
2024	Sean Baker	Anora
2024	Edward Berger	Conclave
2024	Jon M. Chu	Wicked
2024	Coralie Fargeat	The Substance
2024	Denis Villeneuve	Dune: Part Two
2025	Ryan Coogler	Sinners
2025	Paul Thomas Anderson	One Battle After Another
2025	Guillermo del Toro	Frankenstein
2025	Josh Safdie	Marty Supreme
2025	Chloé Zhao	Hamnet
