= Houston Film Critics Society =

Non-profit film critic organization in Houston, Texas

- Formation: 2007
- Purpose: Film Critics
- Location: Houston, Texas
- President: Travis Leamons
- Website: houstonfilmcritics.com

The Houston Film Critics Society (HFCS) is a non-profit film critic unincorporated voluntary organization based in Houston, Texas, United States. The organization includes 37 film critics for print, radio, television, and internet publications in the greater Houston area. It also counts San Antonio as an affiliate city and includes its eligible critics among the collective.

The group presents an annual set of film awards for "extraordinary accomplishment in film" in a ceremony held at the Museum of Fine Arts, Houston. Categories include Best Stunt Coordination Team, Best Casting and the Texas Independent Film Award.

== Organization ==
The board of directors and officers of the organization, as of March 2023, are:

- Travis Leamons – President
- Joseph Friar – Vice President
- Sean McBride – Secretary
- Doug Harris – Treasurer

== Awards by year ==
- Houston Film Critics Society Awards 2007
- Houston Film Critics Society Awards 2008
- Houston Film Critics Society Awards 2009
- Houston Film Critics Society Awards 2010
- Houston Film Critics Society Awards 2011
- Houston Film Critics Society Awards 2012
- Houston Film Critics Society Awards 2013
- Houston Film Critics Society Awards 2014
- Houston Film Critics Society Awards 2015
- Houston Film Critics Society Awards 2016
- Houston Film Critics Society Awards 2017
- Houston Film Critics Society Awards 2018
- Houston Film Critics Society Awards 2019
- Houston Film Critics Society Awards 2020
- Houston Film Critics Society Awards 2021
- Houston Film Critics Society Awards 2022
- Houston Film Critics Society Awards 2023
- Houston Film Critics Society Awards 2024
- Houston Film Critics Society Awards 2025

== Categories ==
- Best Picture
- Best Director
- Best Actor
- Best Actress
- Best Supporting Actor
- Best Supporting Actress
- Best Screenplay
