= Miles Caton =

American musician (born 2005)

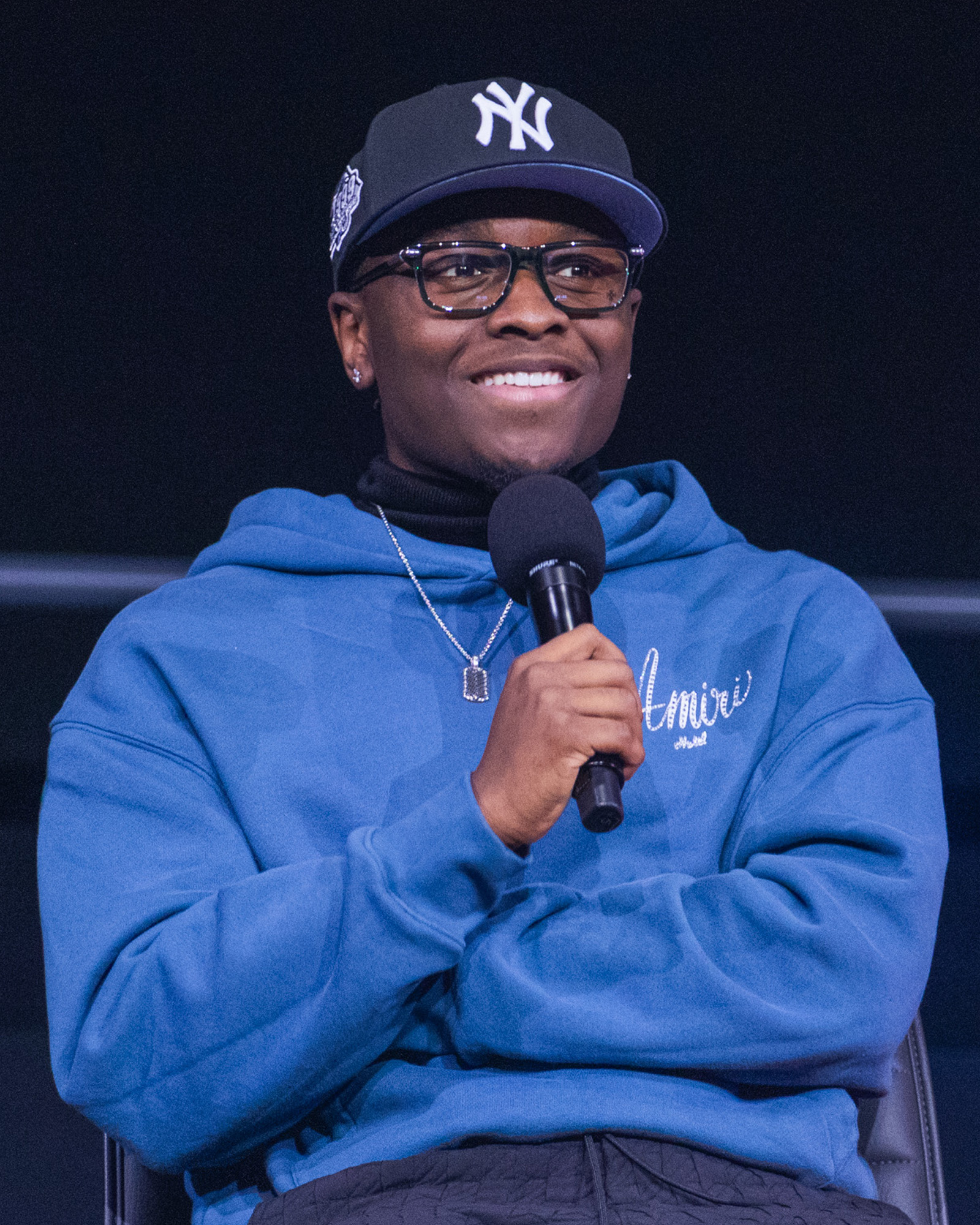
- Caton in 2025

Background information
- Born: March 3, 2005 (age 21); New York City, U.S.
- Genres: Black gospel; R&B; blues
- Occupations: Musician; singer; actor
- Instruments: Guitar; vocals
- Years active: 2017–present
- Label: Columbia

Miles Caton (born March 3, 2005) is an American musician and actor. He gained recognition for his role as Sammie in Ryan Coogler's horror film Sinners (2025), for which he received various accolades, including the Critics' Choice Movie Award for Best Young Performer and nominations for two Actor Awards and the BAFTA Rising Star Award.

== Early life ==
Miles Caton was born on March 3, 2005, in Brooklyn, New York City. He has stated that he came from an "extremely musical family" where every member "can sing or play some type of instrument." Both his mother, pastor Timiney Figueroa, and aunt, Anaysha Figueroa-Cooper, are successful and lifelong gospel singers. Caton began singing at the age of two, and performed a Sam Cooke song at the Lakeview, New York branch of the NAACP's 24th Annual Freedom Fund Awards Gala in October 2010.

Caton graduated high school in 2023, after returning from touring with the artist H.E.R.

== Career ==
=== Music ===
Caton gained fame in 2017 after a video of him singing Nina Simone's 1964 hit "Feeling Good" went viral and was sampled in the opening montage video for rapper Jay-Z's song "4:44". In March 2018, Caton appeared on the season three premiere of the NBC variety show Little Big Shots, performing Kurt Carr's "For Every Mountain." Caton was popular enough to return for the Little Big Shots holiday special in December, where he performed "O Holy Night". On Martin Luther King Jr. Day in 2019, Caton performed live on The View alongside gospel singer Yolanda Adams, singing her song "Never Give Up".

In 2022, Caton toured with H.E.R. In 2023, Caton released his debut single "This Ain't It", which Zach Simmons of Enspire described as "[giving] the world just a taste of what they had been waiting on" featuring "a clean vocal performance reminiscent of legends Stevie Wonder and Donny Hathaway".

He released his single, "Somethin", on July 31, 2025. In March 2026, he signed to Columbia Records and released his major-label debut single "Don't Hate Me".

=== Film ===
In 2025, Caton made his film debut in the Ryan Coogler supernatural horror film Sinners, alongside Michael B. Jordan, Hailee Steinfeld, Wunmi Mosaku, Jack O'Connell, and Delroy Lindo. Caton's musical past played a large role as his character, Sammie, possesses a musical ability that transcends time and leads to the supernatural. Caton performed a number of songs within the film and on the soundtrack, as well as co-wrote the song "Last Time (I Seen the Sun)." He also learned how to play the guitar for the film, performing a substantial amount of acoustic guitar on the soundtrack. The film was met with critical acclaim and grossed over $360 million worldwide. The film achieved a number of box-office records and milestones, including having the biggest opening weekend for an original R-rated film of the decade and becoming the fifth highest-grossing horror movie of all time. Caton's performance was also met with praise and was featured on Variety and Time's Actors to Watch. He was awarded the Best Young Performer award at the 31st Critics' Choice Awards for this role. The film set a record by receiving 16 Academy Award nominations, the highest number in Oscar history.

== Filmography ==
=== Film ===
Year	Title	Role	Notes
2025	Sinners	Samuel "Sammie" Moore / "Preacherboy"	Feature film debut; also played Resonator guitar

=== Television ===
Year	Title	Role	Notes
2018	Little Big Shots	Self	

=== Music videos ===
Year	Title	Artist	Notes	Ref.
2017	4:44	Jay-Z		

== Discography ==
=== Singles ===
- "This Ain't It" (2023)
- "Somethin" (2025)
- "Don't Hate Me" (2026)
- "Lean On" (2026)

=== Soundtrack performances ===
Year	Title	Soundtrack album	Ref.
2025	"This Little Light of Mine"	Sinners	
2025	"Travelin'"	Sinners	
2025	"Juke"	Sinners	
2025	"I Lied to You"	Sinners	
2025	"Last Time (I Seen the Sun)"	Sinners	

== Awards and nominations ==
=== Film ===
Year	Award	Category	Work	Result	Ref.
2025	Actor Awards	Outstanding Performance by a Cast in a Motion Picture	Sinners	Won	
2025	Actor Awards	Outstanding Performance by a Male Actor in a Supporting Role	Sinners	Nominated	
2025	Astra Midseason Movie Awards	Best Supporting Actor	Sinners	Won	
2025	Austin Film Critics Association	Best Ensemble	Sinners	Won	
2025	Critics' Choice Awards	Best Young Actor/Actress	Sinners	Won	
2025	Gotham Film Awards	Ensemble Tribute	Sinners	Won	
2025	Fangoria Chainsaw Awards	Best Supporting Performance	Sinners	Nominated	
2025	Indiana Film Journalists Association	Best Supporting Performance	Sinners	Nominated	
2025	Indiana Film Journalists Association	Best Ensemble Acting	Sinners	Won	
2025	Indiana Film Journalists Association	Breakout of the Year	Sinners	Runner-up	
2025	Michigan Movie Critics Guild	Best Supporting Actor	Sinners	Won	
2025	Michigan Movie Critics Guild	Best Ensemble	Sinners	Won	
2025	Michigan Movie Critics Guild	Breakthrough	Sinners	Won	
2025	NAACP image Awards	Outstanding Breakthrough Performance in Motion Picture	Sinners	Won	
2025	NAACP image Awards	Outstanding Performance by a Supporting Actor in Motion Picture	Sinners	Nominated	
2025	NAACP image Awards	Outstanding Performance by an Ensembled Cast	Sinners	Nominated	
2025	New York Film Critics Online	Best Ensemble Cast	Sinners	Won	
2025	New York Film Critics Online	Breakthrough Performer	Sinners	Runner-up	
2025	Saturn Awards	Best Young Performer In A Flim	Sinners	Nominated	
2025	SCAD Savannah Film Festival	Rising Star	Sinners	Won	
2025	St. Louis Film Critics Association Awards	Best Ensemble	Sinners	Nominated	
2025	Toronto Film Critics Association	Best Breakthrough Performance	Sinners	Runner-up	
2025	Washington D.C. Area Film Critics Association	Best Youth Performance	Sinners	Won	
2025	Washington D.C. Area Film Critics Association	Best Ensemble	Sinners	Won	

=== Music ===
Year	Award	Category	Work	Result	Ref
2025	World Soundtrack Awards	Best Original Song	"I Lied to You" (Sinners, written by Ludwig Göransson, Raphael Saadiq; performed by Miles Caton)	Nominated	
