= Ludwig Göransson =

Swedish musician and composer (born 1984)

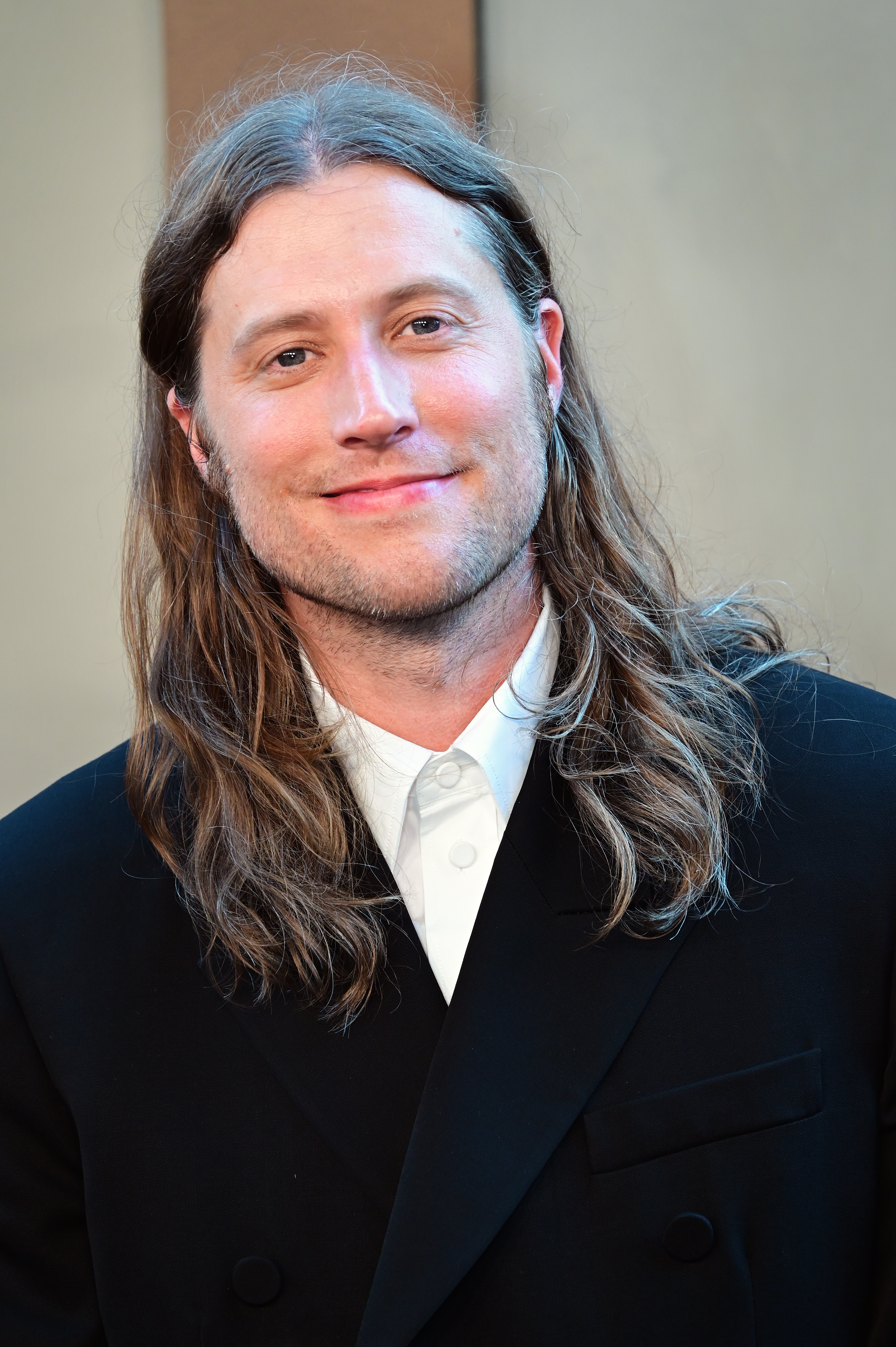
- Göransson in 2026

Background information
- Born: Ludwig Emil Tomas Göransson; 1 September 1984 (age 42); Linköping, Östergötland, Sweden
- Genres: Film score; big band; classical rock; disco; funk rock; jazz rock; R&B; soul; electronic rock; psychedelic rock; swing; hip-hop
- Occupations: Musician; composer; record producer; conductor; songwriter
- Works: Full list
- Years active: 2008–present
- Labels: Roc Nation; Glassnote; Island; Interscope Records
- Spouse: Serena McKinney (m. 2018)
- Awards: Full list

Ludwig Emil Tomas Göransson (/ˈɡɔːrənsən/; Swedish: [ˈlɵ̌dːvɪɡ ˈjœ̂ːranˌsɔn]; born 1 September 1984) is a Swedish musician, composer, and record producer. Based in the United States, he is often regarded as one of the most successful composers in Hollywood and of the 21st century. For his work in music, film and television, he has received numerous accolades including three Academy Awards, two British Academy Film Awards, two Emmy Awards, two Golden Globe Awards, and six Grammy Awards.

As a record producer, he has frequently collaborated with Childish Gambino, producing his studio albums Camp (2011), Because the Internet (2013) and "Awaken, My Love!" (2016), among others. Göransson's producing work on Gambino's 2018 single "This Is America" was met with acclaim and accolades, including two Grammy Awards (for Record of the Year and Song of the Year). He has also produced for other recording artists, such as Adele, Alicia Keys, Rihanna, Chance the Rapper, Haim, Justin Timberlake, Kendrick Lamar, Travis Scott and Moses Sumney.

For television, he received his first break as a composer for the NBC comedy series Community (2009–2015), followed by the Fox comedy series New Girl (2011–2018). Göransson transitioned into dramatic work, scoring the Disney+ series The Mandalorian (2019–2020), which earned him two Primetime Emmy Awards for Outstanding Music Composition for a Series (Original Dramatic Score). He also composed the main theme for The Book of Boba Fett (2021–2022).

For his work in film, he is primarily known for his work with his longtime friend Ryan Coogler, scoring all his films, and Christopher Nolan. He has earned the Academy Award for Best Original Score three times, for Coogler's superhero film Black Panther (2018), Nolan's biopic Oppenheimer (2023) and Coogler's horror film Sinners (2025). He was also nominated for the Academy Award for Best Original Song for "Lift Me Up" performed by Rihanna featured in Black Panther: Wakanda Forever (2022) and for "I Lied to You" from Sinners. Aside from his collaborations with Coogler and Nolan, his other prominent scores include the superhero film Venom (2018), the Pixar film Turning Red (2022), the Mandalorian follow-up film The Mandalorian and Grogu (2026), and Nolan's The Odyssey (2026).

== Early life and education ==
Göransson was born and raised in Linköping, Östergötland. His mother Maria, a florist, is from Warsaw, Poland, and his father Tomas, a guitar teacher, is Swedish. He has an older sister named Jessika. He is named after Ludwig van Beethoven.

He began music lessons at a young age and went on to graduate from the Stockholm Royal College of Music. In 2007, he moved to Los Angeles to study at the University of Southern California Scoring for Motion Picture and Television program. It was there that Ludwig met Ryan Coogler, with whom Ludwig collaborated on numerous projects.

== Career ==
=== 2008–2017: Community, "Awaken, My Love!", and Fruitvale Station ===
Göransson met Ryan Coogler at the University of Southern California (USC) where both were students. He composed the score for the award-winning short film locks in 2009, which Coogler wrote and directed while at USC. Soon after graduating from USC, Göransson began work assisting Theodore Shapiro, a composer known for films such as Along Came Polly, The Devil Wears Prada, Idiocracy, and Tropic Thunder. Göransson's first break came in 2009 as the composer for the sitcom Community.

In 2010, when Donald Glover first approached Göransson about his side project, Childish Gambino, the two were working on the set of Community. Since then they have released four albums: Camp, Because the Internet, "Awaken, My Love!", and 3.15.20. Göransson served as producer and writer for every song on the album "Awaken, My Love!", inspired by Parliament-Funkadelic and black power music of the '70s. They earned four Grammy nominations for their work on "Awaken, My Love!", including Album of the Year and Record of the Year for "Redbone". Overall, his work with Gambino earned him six Grammy Award nominations. In 2012, Göransson produced Haim's debut EP and helped establish the band with a new sound on the song "Forever". He also produced two songs on the band's debut album Days Are Gone.

In 2013, Göransson's first feature film came from fellow USC graduate Ryan Coogler. Göransson composed the score to Coogler's critically acclaimed drama Fruitvale Station, based on the fatal shooting of 22-year-old Oscar Grant. The film won the Grand Jury Prize and Audience awards in the Dramatic category at the 2013 Sundance Film Festival, also taking home the Avenir Prize and Un Certain Regard awards at the Cannes Film Festival. In August 2013, Göransson signed a management deal as a composer for Jay-Z's label, Roc Nation. That year he also composed the music for the movie We're the Millers. In 2015, Coogler and Göransson again worked together this time on the critically acclaimed Rocky franchise film Creed. By 2016–17, he was scoring True Memoirs of an International Assassin, Central Intelligence and Everything, Everything.

=== 2018–2022: Black Panther, "This is America", and The Mandalorian ===
In 2018, Göransson and Coogler came together for their third collaboration, Black Panther. Göransson set out to create a score that would sit somewhere between traditional African instrumentation and a traditional superhero score. In order to do this he travelled to Senegal to research traditional African music and instruments. There he met musician Baaba Maal whose voice is featured in the score, singing in his native Fula language. He later traveled to the International Library of African Music in South Africa, founded by Hugh Tracey, where he listened to recordings of traditional musicians to ensure the score had a culturally traditional sound. In 2019, Göransson's score for Black Panther won the Academy Award for Best Original Score and the Grammy Award for Best Score Soundtrack for Visual Media.

On 5 May 2018, "This Is America" was released. Produced by Gambino and Ludwig Göransson, the song features a gospel-style choir and background contributions from various American rappers Young Thug, Slim Jxmmi, BlocBoy JB, 21 Savage, Quavo and Offset. "This Is America" debuted at number one on the US Billboard Hot 100, becoming the 31st song to do so in the chart's history. The song won in all four of its nominated categories at the 61st Annual Grammy Awards for Record of the Year, Song of the Year, Best Rap/Sung Performance, and Best Music Video.

On 22 May 2019, it was announced that Göransson was composing the film score for Christopher Nolan's Tenet. Göransson was chosen after Nolan's frequent collaborator and first choice, Hans Zimmer, turned down the offer in favor of the 2021 film Dune. Göransson experimented with retrograde composition and sampling to match the themes and tone of the film. The first scoring session was held in November 2019, and sessions continued into early 2020. He worked on original songs and music with Justin Timberlake for the 2020 film Trolls World Tour.

Since 2019, Göransson has composed the score for the Disney+ television series The Mandalorian, which is set in the Star Wars universe, as well as the fanfare for the franchise's brand logo. He won the Primetime Emmy Award for Outstanding Music Composition for a Series for both season 1 and season 2's finales. In 2021, he started scoring sessions for The Mandalorian's spinoff series, The Book of Boba Fett, which premiered on 29 December 2021. In 2021, he was chosen to be the composer of the new fanfare for Warner Bros. Pictures, which combines a new arrangement of "As Time Goes By" with elements of the original Max Steiner fanfare. In 2022, he worked on the scores of the Pixar film Turning Red and the second Black Panther installment, Wakanda Forever. For the latter, he co-wrote the song "Lift Me Up" performed by Rihanna, which earned him a nomination for the Academy Award for Best Original Song.

=== 2023–present: Further Coogler, Nolan, and Star Wars collaborations ===
He worked for a second time with Christopher Nolan on his 2023 film Oppenheimer. Its accompanying soundtrack received critical acclaim and earned Göransson the Grammy Award for Best Score Soundtrack for Visual Media, the BAFTA Award for Best Original Music, the Critics' Choice Movie Award for Best Score, the Golden Globe Award for Best Original Score, and the Academy Award for Best Original Score.

In 2024, he composed the Disney+ mnemonic as part of the streaming service's rebrand.

For his work on Ryan Coogler's Sinners, he earned his third Oscar win at the 98th Academy Awards. The soundtrack, which he based on his experience with American blues music, was also inspired by his father's love of the genre.

In 2026, Göransson composed two major film scores. He returned for the theatrical follow-up to The Mandalorian, The Mandalorian and Grogu. He reunited with Nolan for The Odyssey.

== Personal life ==
Göransson married American violinist Serena McKinney in 2018. They have two sons.

== Filmography ==
As a composer

Key
†	Denotes films that have not yet been released

=== Films ===
Year	Title	Director(s)	Notes	Refs.
2011	30 Minutes or Less	Ruben Fleischer		
2013	Fruitvale Station	Ryan Coogler	First collaboration with Coogler	
2013	We're the Millers	Rawson Marshall Thurber		
2014	Stretch	Joe Carnahan		
2014	The Town That Dreaded Sundown	Alfonso Gomez-Rejon		
2014	A Merry Friggin' Christmas	Tristram Shapeero		
2014	Top Five	Chris Rock		
2015	Creed	Ryan Coogler	Second collaboration with Coogler	
2016	Central Intelligence	Rawson Marshall Thurber		
2016	True Memoirs of an International Assassin	Jeff Wadlow		
2017	Everything, Everything	Stella Meghie		
2018	Black Panther	Ryan Coogler	Third collaboration with Coogler	
2018	Death Wish	Eli Roth		
2018	Slice	Austin Vesely		
2018	Venom	Ruben Fleischer		
2018	Creed II	Steven Caple Jr.		
2020	Tenet	Christopher Nolan	First collaboration with Nolan	
2021	Bad Trip	Kitao Sakurai		
2022	Turning Red	Domee Shi	First score for an animated film	
2022	Black Panther: Wakanda Forever	Ryan Coogler	Fourth collaboration with Coogler	
2023	Oppenheimer	Christopher Nolan	Second collaboration with Nolan	
2025	Sinners	Ryan Coogler	Fifth collaboration with Coogler. Also executive producer	
2026	The Mandalorian and Grogu	Jon Favreau	Third collaboration with Favreau, first in a feature film	
2026	The Odyssey	Christopher Nolan	Third collaboration with Nolan	

=== Television ===
Year	Title	Showrunner(s)	Network	Refs.
2009–2015	Community	Dan Harmon	NBC (seasons 1–5); Yahoo! Screen (season 6)	
2011–2013	Happy Endings	David Caspe	ABC	
2011–2018	New Girl	Elizabeth Meriwether	Fox	
2014–2015	Satisfaction	Sean Jablonski	USA Network	
2016–2018	Angie Tribeca	Steve Carell; Nancy Carell	TBS	
2017	Hasan Minhaj: Homecoming King	Hasan Minhaj	Netflix	
2018–2020	Patriot Act with Hasan Minhaj	Richard A. Preuss	Netflix	
2019–2020	The Mandalorian	Jon Favreau	Disney+	
2021–2022	The Book of Boba Fett	Jon Favreau	Disney+	
TBA	The X-Files	Jennifer Yale	Hulu	

== Awards and nominations ==
For The Mandalorian, Göransson earned the Primetime Emmy Award for Outstanding Music Composition for a Series for both season 1 and season 2's finales. In film, his score for Black Panther won the Academy Award for Best Original Score and the Grammy Award for Best Score Soundtrack for Visual Media. He scored the second Black Panther film, 2022's Wakanda Forever, achieving a nomination for the Academy Award for Best Original Song for "Lift Me Up" performed by Rihanna. His work on Christopher Nolan's epic biopic Oppenheimer (2023) earned his first wins at the BAFTA Awards and Golden Globe Awards, and a second win at the Academy Awards. For Sinners, he won his third Academy Award.

== See also ==
- Music of Star Wars
- Music of the Marvel Cinematic Universe
