= List of accolades received by Lady Bird (film) =

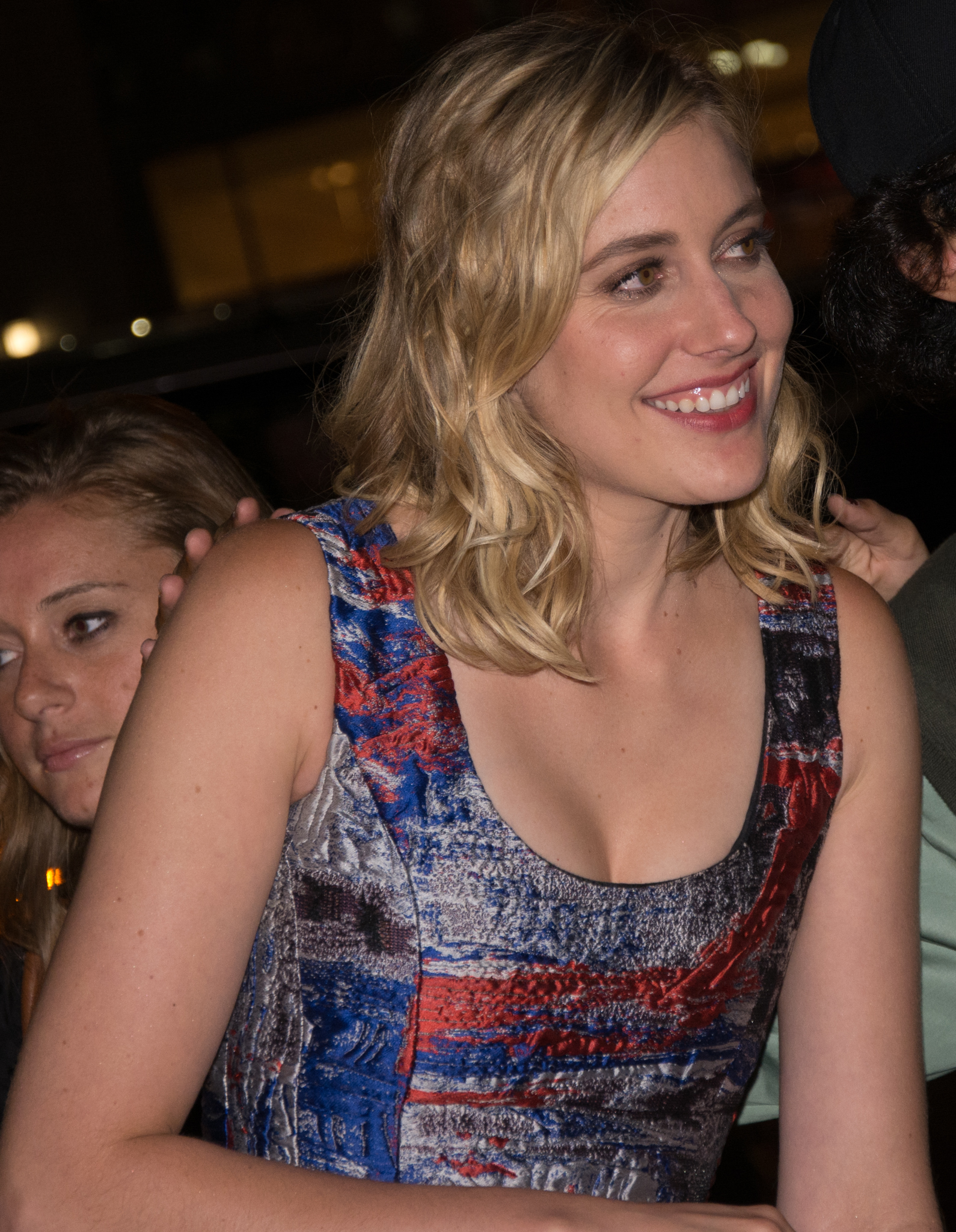
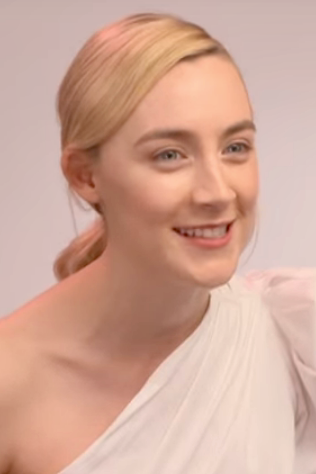
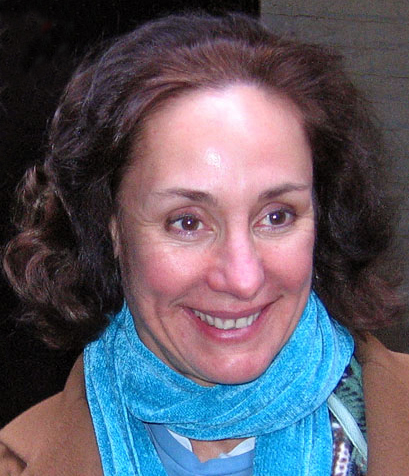
- Greta Gerwig (left) received critical acclaim for her screenplay and direction, and Saoirse Ronan (center) and Laurie Metcalf (right) for their performances in the film.
Accolades
Award	Wins	Nominations
AACTA International Awards	0	5
AARP's Movies for Grownups Awards	1	3
Academy Awards	0	5
Alliance of Women Film Journalists	3	7
American Cinema Editors	0	1
American Film Institute	1	1
Art Directors Guild Awards	0	1
Austin Film Critics Association	2	7
Boston Society of Film Critics	2	2
British Academy Film Awards	0	3
Casting Society of America	1	1
Chicago Film Critics Association	4	6
Costume Designers Guild	0	1
Critics' Choice Movie Awards	0	8
Dallas–Fort Worth Film Critics Association	5	5
Denver International Film Festival	1	1
Detroit Film Critics Society	0	5
Directors Guild of America Awards	0	1
Dorian Awards	2	5
Evening Standard British Film Awards	0	1
Florida Film Critics Circle	3	6
Georgia Film Critics Association	4	8
GLAAD Media Awards	0	1
Golden Globe Awards	2	4
Golden Tomato Awards	2	2
Gotham Awards	1	4
Guild of Music Supervisors Awards	1	1
Hollywood Music in Media Awards	1	1
Houston Film Critics Society	3	5
Humanitas Prize	1	1
IGN Awards	0	4
Independent Spirit Awards	1	4
IndieWire Critic's Poll	5	5
Location Managers Guild Awards	0	1
London Film Critics' Circle	0	4
Los Angeles Film Critics Association	2	2
Mill Valley Film Festival	1	1
National Board of Review	3	3
National Society of Film Critics	5	5
New York Film Critics Circle	2	2
New York Film Critics Online	1	1
Online Film Critics Society	1	6
Palm Springs International Film Festival	1	1
Producers Guild of America Awards	0	1
San Diego Film Critics Society	4	7
San Francisco Film Critics Circle	1	4
Santa Barbara International Film Festival	1	1
Satellite Awards	1	7
Screen Actors Guild Awards	0	3
Seattle Film Critics Society	3	7
St. Louis Film Critics Association	3	6
Teen Choice Awards	0	2
Toronto Film Critics Association	4	4
Vancouver Film Critics Circle	3	5
Washington D.C. Area Film Critics Association	1	5
Women Film Critics Circle	3	4
Writers Guild of America Awards	0	1

Totals (Note: Certain award groups do not simply award one winner. They acknowledge several different recipients, have runners-up, and have third place. Since this is a specific recognition and is different from losing an award, runner-up mentions are considered wins in this award tally. For simplification and to avoid errors, each award in this list has been presumed to have had a prior nomination.)
- Wins: 84
- Nominations: 197

Lady Bird is a 2017 American coming-of-age comedy-drama film written and directed by Greta Gerwig. Set in Sacramento, California, the film follows Christine "Lady Bird" McPherson (Saoirse Ronan), a high-school senior, and her turbulent relationship with her mother (Laurie Metcalf). It also stars Tracy Letts, Lucas Hedges, Timothée Chalamet, Beanie Feldstein, Stephen McKinley Henderson, and Lois Smith.

The film premiered at the Telluride Film Festival on September 1, 2017. A24 began a limited release in the United States on November 3, 2017, before expanding to a wide release on November 24. Its $91,109 per theater average was the second highest opening average of the year and the highest-ever for a film in limited release directed by a woman. The film has so far earned $31.4 million at the worldwide box office, against a production budget of $10 million. Rotten Tomatoes, a review aggregator, surveyed 214 reviews and judged 99% of them to be positive. On November 27, 2017, the film became the most-reviewed film ever to remain at 100% on the site with 164 positive reviews, beating previous record holder Toy Story 2, which has 163 positive reviews. It stayed at 100% until 196 registered reviews. Metacritic calculated a weighted average score of 94 out of 100 based on 48 reviews, indicating "universal acclaim".

Lady Bird received praise for Ronan and Metcalf's performances, as well as Gerwig's screenplay and direction. It was selected by the American Film Institute as one of its ten Movies of the Year. National Board of Review listed the film in its 2017 Top Ten Films, with Gerwig and Metcalf winning the Best Director and Best Supporting Actress awards, respectively. The film garnered four nominations at the 75th Golden Globe Awards, winning Best Motion Picture – Musical or Comedy and Best Actress – Musical or Comedy for Ronan. It received eight nominations at the 23rd Critics' Choice Awards, including Best Picture, Best Director, Best Actress, Best Supporting Actress, Best Original Screenplay, and Best Acting Ensemble.

Lady Bird garnered four nominations at the 33rd Independent Spirit Awards: Best Feature, Best Female Lead, Best Supporting Female, and Best Screenplay. At the 24th Screen Actors Guild Awards, it was nominated for Outstanding Performance by a Female Actor in a Leading Role for Ronan, Outstanding Performance by a Female Actor in a Supporting Role for Metcalf, and Outstanding Performance by a Cast in a Motion Picture.

== Accolades ==
Award	Date of ceremony	Category	Recipients	Result	Ref.
AACTA International Awards	January 5, 2018	Best Film	Lady Bird	Nominated	
AACTA International Awards	January 5, 2018	Best Direction	Greta Gerwig	Nominated	
AACTA International Awards	January 5, 2018	Best Actress	Saoirse Ronan	Nominated	
AACTA International Awards	January 5, 2018	Best Supporting Actress	Laurie Metcalf	Nominated	
AACTA International Awards	January 5, 2018	Best Screenplay	Greta Gerwig	Nominated	
AARP's Movies for Grownups Awards	February 5, 2018	Best Picture	Lady Bird	Nominated	
AARP's Movies for Grownups Awards	February 5, 2018	Best Supporting Actress	Laurie Metcalf	Won	
AARP's Movies for Grownups Awards	February 5, 2018	Best Intergenerational Film	Lady Bird	Nominated	
Academy Awards	March 4, 2018	Best Picture	Scott Rudin, Eli Bush and Evelyn O'Neill	Nominated	
Academy Awards	March 4, 2018	Best Director	Greta Gerwig	Nominated	
Academy Awards	March 4, 2018	Best Actress	Saoirse Ronan	Nominated	
Academy Awards	March 4, 2018	Best Supporting Actress	Laurie Metcalf	Nominated	
Academy Awards	March 4, 2018	Best Original Screenplay	Greta Gerwig	Nominated	
Alliance of Women Film Journalists	January 9, 2018	Best Film	Lady Bird	Nominated	
Alliance of Women Film Journalists	January 9, 2018	Best Director	Greta Gerwig	Nominated	
Alliance of Women Film Journalists	January 9, 2018	Best Original Screenplay	Greta Gerwig	Nominated	
Alliance of Women Film Journalists	January 9, 2018	Best Actress in a Supporting Role	Laurie Metcalf	Won	
Alliance of Women Film Journalists	January 9, 2018	Best Woman Director	Greta Gerwig	Won	
Alliance of Women Film Journalists	January 9, 2018	Best Woman Screenwriter	Greta Gerwig	Won	
Alliance of Women Film Journalists	January 9, 2018	Outstanding Achievement by a Woman in the Film Industry	Greta Gerwig	Nominated	
American Cinema Editors	January 26, 2018	Best Edited Feature Film – Comedy or Musical	Nick Houy	Nominated	
American Film Institute	January 5, 2018	Top Ten Films of the Year	Lady Bird	Won	
Art Directors Guild Awards	January 27, 2018	Excellence in Production Design for a Contemporary Film	Chris Jones	Nominated	
Austin Film Critics Association	January 8, 2018	Best Film	Lady Bird	Nominated	
Austin Film Critics Association	January 8, 2018	Best Director	Greta Gerwig	Nominated	
Austin Film Critics Association	January 8, 2018	Best Actress	Saoirse Ronan	Nominated	
Austin Film Critics Association	January 8, 2018	Best Supporting Actress	Laurie Metcalf	Nominated	
Austin Film Critics Association	January 8, 2018	Best Original Screenplay	Greta Gerwig	Nominated	
Austin Film Critics Association	January 8, 2018	Robert R. 'Bobby' McCurdy Memorial Breakthrough Artist Award	Timothée Chalamet (Note: Also for his work in Call Me by Your Name and Hostiles.)	Won	
Austin Film Critics Association	January 8, 2018	Top Ten Films	Lady Bird	3rd place	
Boston Society of Film Critics	December 10, 2017	Best Supporting Actress	Laurie Metcalf	Won	
Boston Society of Film Critics	December 10, 2017	Best Screenplay	Greta Gerwig	Won	
British Academy Film Awards	February 18, 2018	Best Actress in a Leading Role	Saoirse Ronan	Nominated	
British Academy Film Awards	February 18, 2018	Best Actress in a Supporting Role	Laurie Metcalf	Nominated	
British Academy Film Awards	February 18, 2018	Best Original Screenplay	Greta Gerwig	Nominated	
British Film Institute	December 14, 2017	Sight & Sound's Best Films of 2017	Lady Bird	19th place (Note: Tied with I Am Not Your Negro, Let the Sunshine In, Moonlight, Mother!, and Mudbound.)	
Casting Society of America	January 18, 2018	Feature Studio Or Independent – Comedy	Jordan Thaler and Heidi Griffiths	Won	
Chicago Film Critics Association	December 12, 2017	Best Film	Lady Bird	Won	
Chicago Film Critics Association	December 12, 2017	Best Director	Greta Gerwig	Nominated	
Chicago Film Critics Association	December 12, 2017	Best Actress	Saoirse Ronan	Won	
Chicago Film Critics Association	December 12, 2017	Best Supporting Actress	Laurie Metcalf	Won	
Chicago Film Critics Association	December 12, 2017	Best Original Screenplay	Greta Gerwig	Nominated	
Chicago Film Critics Association	December 12, 2017	Most Promising Filmmaker	Greta Gerwig	Won	
Costume Designers Guild	February 20, 2018	Excellence in Contemporary Film	April Napier	Nominated	
Critics' Choice Movie Awards	January 11, 2018	Best Picture	Lady Bird	Nominated	
Critics' Choice Movie Awards	January 11, 2018	Best Director	Greta Gerwig	Nominated	
Critics' Choice Movie Awards	January 11, 2018	Best Actress	Saoirse Ronan	Nominated	
Critics' Choice Movie Awards	January 11, 2018	Best Supporting Actress	Laurie Metcalf	Nominated	
Critics' Choice Movie Awards	January 11, 2018	Best Acting Ensemble	The cast of Lady Bird	Nominated	
Critics' Choice Movie Awards	January 11, 2018	Best Original Screenplay	Greta Gerwig	Nominated	
Critics' Choice Movie Awards	January 11, 2018	Best Comedy	Lady Bird	Nominated	
Critics' Choice Movie Awards	January 11, 2018	Best Actress in a Comedy	Saoirse Ronan	Nominated	
Dallas–Fort Worth Film Critics Association	December 13, 2017	Best Film	Lady Bird	3rd Place	
Dallas–Fort Worth Film Critics Association	December 13, 2017	Best Director	Greta Gerwig	2nd Place	
Dallas–Fort Worth Film Critics Association	December 13, 2017	Best Actress	Saoirse Ronan	4th Place	
Dallas–Fort Worth Film Critics Association	December 13, 2017	Best Supporting Actress	Laurie Metcalf	2nd Place	
Dallas–Fort Worth Film Critics Association	December 13, 2017	Best Screenplay	Greta Gerwig	Won	
Denver International Film Festival	November 14, 2017	Rare Pearl Award	Greta Gerwig	Won	
Detroit Film Critics Society	December 7, 2017	Best Director	Greta Gerwig	Nominated	
Detroit Film Critics Society	December 7, 2017	Best Actress	Saoirse Ronan	Nominated	
Detroit Film Critics Society	December 7, 2017	Best Supporting Actress	Laurie Metcalf	Nominated	
Detroit Film Critics Society	December 7, 2017	Best Ensemble	The cast of Lady Bird	Nominated	
Detroit Film Critics Society	December 7, 2017	Best Screenplay	Greta Gerwig	Nominated	
Directors Guild of America Awards	February 3, 2018	Outstanding Directing – Feature Film	Greta Gerwig	Nominated	
Dorian Awards	February 24, 2018	Film of the Year	Lady Bird	Nominated	
Dorian Awards	February 24, 2018	Director of the Year	Greta Gerwig	Won	
Dorian Awards	February 24, 2018	Best Performance of the Year – Actress	Saoirse Ronan	Nominated	
Dorian Awards	February 24, 2018	Supporting Film Performance of the Year – Actress	Laurie Metcalf	Won	
Dorian Awards	February 24, 2018	Screenplay of the Year	Greta Gerwig	Nominated	
Evening Standard British Film Awards	February 8, 2018	Best Actress	Saoirse Ronan	Nominated	
Florida Film Critics Circle	December 23, 2017	Best Film	Lady Bird	Runner-up	
Florida Film Critics Circle	December 23, 2017	Best Director	Greta Gerwig	Runner-up	
Florida Film Critics Circle	December 23, 2017	Best Actress	Saoirse Ronan	Nominated	
Florida Film Critics Circle	December 23, 2017	Best Supporting Actress	Laurie Metcalf	Runner-up	
Florida Film Critics Circle	December 23, 2017	Best Original Screenplay	Greta Gerwig	Nominated	
Florida Film Critics Circle	December 23, 2017	Best Cast	The cast of Lady Bird	Nominated	
Georgia Film Critics Association	January 12, 2018	Best Picture	Lady Bird	Won	
Georgia Film Critics Association	January 12, 2018	Best Director	Greta Gerwig	Won	
Georgia Film Critics Association	January 12, 2018	Best Actress	Saoirse Ronan	Won	
Georgia Film Critics Association	January 12, 2018	Best Supporting Actress	Laurie Metcalf	Won	
Georgia Film Critics Association	January 12, 2018	Best Original Screenplay	Greta Gerwig	Nominated	
Georgia Film Critics Association	January 12, 2018	Best Ensemble	The cast of Lady Bird	Nominated	
Georgia Film Critics Association	January 12, 2018	Breakthrough Award	Timothée Chalamet (Note: Also for his work in Call Me by Your Name, Hot Summer Nights, and Hostiles.)	Nominated	
Georgia Film Critics Association	January 12, 2018	Breakthrough Award	Greta Gerwig	Nominated	
GLAAD Media Awards	April 12, 2018	Outstanding Film – Wide Release	Lady Bird	Nominated	
Golden Globe Awards	January 7, 2018	Best Motion Picture — Musical or Comedy	Lady Bird	Won	
Golden Globe Awards	January 7, 2018	Best Actress – Motion Picture Musical or Comedy	Saoirse Ronan	Won	
Golden Globe Awards	January 7, 2018	Best Supporting Actress – Motion Picture	Laurie Metcalf	Nominated	
Golden Globe Awards	January 7, 2018	Best Screenplay	Greta Gerwig	Nominated	
Golden Tomato Awards	January 3, 2018	Best Wide Release 2017	Lady Bird	5th Place	
Golden Tomato Awards	January 3, 2018	Best Comedy Movie 2017	Lady Bird	Won	
Gotham Awards	November 27, 2017	Best Actress	Saoirse Ronan	Won	
Gotham Awards	November 27, 2017	Best Screenplay	Greta Gerwig	Nominated	
Gotham Awards	November 27, 2017	Bingham Ray Breakthrough Director	Greta Gerwig	Nominated	
Gotham Awards	November 27, 2017	Audience Award	Lady Bird	Nominated	
Grammy Awards	February 10, 2019	Best Compilation Soundtrack for Visual Media	Lady Bird	Nominated	
Guild of Music Supervisors Awards	February 8, 2018	Best Music Supervision for Film: Budgeted Under 25 Million Dollars	Brian Ross and Michael Hill	Won	
Hollywood Music in Media Awards	November 16, 2017	Outstanding Music Supervision – Film	Brian Ross	Won	
Houston Film Critics Society	January 6, 2018	Best Picture	Lady Bird	Won	
Houston Film Critics Society	January 6, 2018	Best Director	Greta Gerwig	Won	
Houston Film Critics Society	January 6, 2018	Best Actress	Saoirse Ronan	Nominated	
Houston Film Critics Society	January 6, 2018	Best Supporting Actress	Laurie Metcalf	Nominated	
Houston Film Critics Society	January 6, 2018	Best Screenplay	Greta Gerwig	Won	
Humanitas Prize	February 16, 2018	Feature – Comedy	Greta Gerwig	Won	
IGN Awards	December 19, 2017	Movie of the Year	Lady Bird	Nominated	
IGN Awards	December 19, 2017	Best Comedy Movie	Lady Bird	Nominated	
IGN Awards	December 19, 2017	Best Lead Performer in a Movie	Saoirse Ronan	Nominated	
IGN Awards	December 19, 2017	Best Director	Greta Gerwig	Nominated	
Independent Spirit Awards	March 3, 2018	Best Feature	Lady Bird	Nominated	
Independent Spirit Awards	March 3, 2018	Best Female Lead	Saoirse Ronan	Nominated	
Independent Spirit Awards	March 3, 2018	Best Supporting Female	Laurie Metcalf	Nominated	
Independent Spirit Awards	March 3, 2018	Best Screenplay	Greta Gerwig	Won	
IndieWire Critics Poll	December 19, 2017	Best Picture	Lady Bird	2nd Place	
IndieWire Critics Poll	December 19, 2017	Best Director	Greta Gerwig	3rd Place	
IndieWire Critics Poll	December 19, 2017	Best Actress	Saoirse Ronan	Won	
IndieWire Critics Poll	December 19, 2017	Best Supporting Actress	Laurie Metcalf	Won	
IndieWire Critics Poll	December 19, 2017	Best Screenplay	Greta Gerwig	2nd Place	
Irish Film & Television Awards	February 15, 2018	Actress in a Lead Role – Film	Saoirse Ronan	Won	
Irish Film & Television Awards	February 15, 2018	International Film	Lady Bird	Nominated	
Location Managers Guild Awards	April 7, 2018	Outstanding Locations in Contemporary Film	Michael Smith	Nominated	
Location Managers Guild Awards	April 7, 2018	Outstanding Film Commission	Sacramento Film Commission	Nominated	
London Film Critics Circle	January 28, 2018	Film of the Year	Lady Bird	Nominated	
London Film Critics Circle	January 28, 2018	Supporting Actress of the Year	Laurie Metcalf	Nominated	
London Film Critics Circle	January 28, 2018	Screenwriter of the Year	Greta Gerwig	Nominated	
London Film Critics Circle	January 28, 2018	British/Irish Actress of the Year	Saoirse Ronan	Nominated	
Los Angeles Film Critics Association	January 13, 2018	Best Supporting Actress	Laurie Metcalf	Won	
Los Angeles Film Critics Association	January 13, 2018	New Generation Award	Greta Gerwig	Won	
Mill Valley Film Festival	October 17, 2017	U.S. Cinema: Audience Favorite-Silver Award	Greta Gerwig	Won	
MTV Movie & TV Awards	June 18, 2018	Best Performance in a Movie	Saoirse Ronan	Nominated	
National Board of Review	January 9, 2018	Top 10 Films	Lady Bird	Won	
National Board of Review	January 9, 2018	Best Director	Greta Gerwig	Won	
National Board of Review	January 9, 2018	Best Supporting Actress	Laurie Metcalf	Won	
National Society of Film Critics	January 6, 2018	Best Film	Lady Bird	Won	
National Society of Film Critics	January 6, 2018	Best Director	Greta Gerwig	Won	
National Society of Film Critics	January 6, 2018	Best Actress	Saoirse Ronan	2nd Place	
National Society of Film Critics	January 6, 2018	Best Supporting Actress	Laurie Metcalf	Won	
National Society of Film Critics	January 6, 2018	Best Screenplay	Greta Gerwig	Won	
New York Film Critics Circle	January 3, 2018	Best Film	Lady Bird	Won	
New York Film Critics Circle	January 3, 2018	Best Actress	Saoirse Ronan	Won	
New York Film Critics Online	December 10, 2017	Top 10 Films	Lady Bird	Won	
Online Film Critics Society	December 28, 2017	Best Picture	Lady Bird	Nominated	
Online Film Critics Society	December 28, 2017	Best Director	Greta Gerwig	Nominated	
Online Film Critics Society	December 28, 2017	Best Actress	Saoirse Ronan	Nominated	
Online Film Critics Society	December 28, 2017	Best Supporting Actress	Laurie Metcalf	Won	
Online Film Critics Society	December 28, 2017	Best Original Screenplay	Greta Gerwig	Nominated	
Online Film Critics Society	December 28, 2017	Best Ensemble	The cast of Lady Bird	Nominated	
Palm Springs International Film Festival	January 2, 2018	Desert Palm Achievement Award	Saoirse Ronan	Won	
Producers Guild of America Awards	January 20, 2018	Best Theatrical Motion Picture	Scott Rudin, Eli Bush and Evelin O'Neil	Nominated	
San Diego Film Critics Society	December 11, 2017	Best Film	Lady Bird	Runner-up	
San Diego Film Critics Society	December 11, 2017	Best Director	Greta Gerwig	Won	
San Diego Film Critics Society	December 11, 2017	Best Actress	Saoirse Ronan	Nominated	
San Diego Film Critics Society	December 11, 2017	Best Supporting Actress	Laurie Metcalf	Won (Note: Tied with Allison Janney for I, Tonya)	
San Diego Film Critics Society	December 11, 2017	Best Original Screenplay	Greta Gerwig	Runner-up	
San Diego Film Critics Society	December 11, 2017	Breakthrough Artist	Greta Gerwig	Nominated	
San Diego Film Critics Society	December 11, 2017	Best Cast	The cast of Lady Bird	Nominated	
San Francisco Film Critics Circle	December 10, 2017	Best Director	Greta Gerwig	Nominated	
San Francisco Film Critics Circle	December 10, 2017	Best Actress	Saoirse Ronan	Nominated	
San Francisco Film Critics Circle	December 10, 2017	Best Supporting Actress	Laurie Metcalf	Won	
San Francisco Film Critics Circle	December 10, 2017	Best Original Screenplay	Greta Gerwig	Nominated	
Santa Barbara International Film Festival	February 4, 2018	Santa Barbara Award	Saoirse Ronan	Won	
Satellite Awards	February 10, 2018	Auteur Award	Greta Gerwig	Won	
Satellite Awards	February 10, 2018	Best Film	Lady Bird	Nominated	
Satellite Awards	February 10, 2018	Best Director	Greta Gerwig	Nominated	
Satellite Awards	February 10, 2018	Best Actress	Saoirse Ronan	Nominated	
Satellite Awards	February 10, 2018	Best Supporting Actress	Laurie Metcalf	Nominated	
Satellite Awards	February 10, 2018	Best Original Screenplay	Greta Gerwig	Nominated	
Satellite Awards	February 10, 2018	Best Cinematography	Sam Levy	Nominated	
Screen Actors Guild Awards	January 21, 2018	Outstanding Performance by a Cast in a Motion Picture	The cast of Lady Bird	Nominated	
Screen Actors Guild Awards	January 21, 2018	Outstanding Performance by a Female Actor in a Leading Role	Saoirse Ronan	Nominated	
Screen Actors Guild Awards	January 21, 2018	Outstanding Performance by a Female Actor in a Supporting Role	Laurie Metcalf	Nominated	
Seattle Film Critics Society	December 18, 2017	Best Picture	Lady Bird	Nominated	
Seattle Film Critics Society	December 18, 2017	Best Director	Greta Gerwig	Nominated	
Seattle Film Critics Society	December 18, 2017	Best Actress	Saoirse Ronan	Won	
Seattle Film Critics Society	December 18, 2017	Best Supporting Actress	Laurie Metcalf	Won	
Seattle Film Critics Society	December 18, 2017	Best Screenplay	Greta Gerwig	Won	
Seattle Film Critics Society	December 18, 2017	Best Editing	Nick Houy	Nominated	
Seattle Film Critics Society	December 18, 2017	Best Ensemble	The cast of Lady Bird	Nominated	
St. Louis Film Critics Association	December 17, 2017	Best Film	Lady Bird	Nominated	
St. Louis Film Critics Association	December 17, 2017	Best Director	Greta Gerwig	Nominated	
St. Louis Film Critics Association	December 17, 2017	Best Actress	Saoirse Ronan	Nominated	
St. Louis Film Critics Association	December 17, 2017	Best Supporting Actress	Laurie Metcalf	Won	
St. Louis Film Critics Association	December 17, 2017	Best Original Screenplay	Greta Gerwig	Runner-up	
St. Louis Film Critics Association	December 17, 2017	Best Scene	Coach Directing The Tempest	Runner-up (Note: Tied with Baby Driver (Baby (Ansel Elgort) goes for coffee (opening credits)))	
Teen Choice Awards	August 12, 2018	Choice Drama Movie Actor	Timothée Chalamet	Nominated	
Teen Choice Awards	August 12, 2018	Choice Drama Movie Actress	Saoirse Ronan	Nominated	
Toronto Film Critics Association	December 10, 2017	Best Director	Greta Gerwig	Won	
Toronto Film Critics Association	December 10, 2017	Best Actress	Saoirse Ronan	Runner-up	
Toronto Film Critics Association	December 10, 2017	Best Supporting Actress	Laurie Metcalf	Won	
Toronto Film Critics Association	December 10, 2017	Best Screenplay	Greta Gerwig	Runner-up	
Vancouver Film Critics Circle	January 6, 2018	Best Film	Lady Bird	Won	
Vancouver Film Critics Circle	January 6, 2018	Best Director	Greta Gerwig	Nominated	
Vancouver Film Critics Circle	January 6, 2018	Best Actress	Saoirse Ronan	Won	
Vancouver Film Critics Circle	January 6, 2018	Best Supporting Actress	Laurie Metcalf	Won	
Vancouver Film Critics Circle	January 6, 2018	Best Screenplay	Greta Gerwig	Nominated	
Washington D.C. Area Film Critics Association	December 8, 2017	Best Film	Lady Bird	Nominated	
Washington D.C. Area Film Critics Association	December 8, 2017	Best Director	Greta Gerwig	Nominated	
Washington D.C. Area Film Critics Association	December 8, 2017	Best Actress	Saoirse Ronan	Nominated	
Washington D.C. Area Film Critics Association	December 8, 2017	Best Supporting Actress	Laurie Metcalf	Won	
Washington D.C. Area Film Critics Association	December 8, 2017	Best Original Screenplay	Greta Gerwig	Nominated	
Women Film Critics Circle	December 17, 2017	Best Movie About Women	Lady Bird	Won	
Women Film Critics Circle	December 17, 2017	Best Movie by a Woman	Lady Bird	Won	
Women Film Critics Circle	December 17, 2017	Best Woman Storyteller	Greta Gerwig	Won	
Women Film Critics Circle	December 17, 2017	Best Comedic Actress	Saoirse Ronan	Nominated	
Writers Guild of America Awards	February 11, 2018	Best Original Screenplay	Greta Gerwig	Nominated	

== See also ==
- 2017 in film
