= Christopher Robin (soundtrack) =

Christopher Robin (Original Motion Picture Soundtrack)

Soundtrack album by Geoff Zanelli and Jon Brion
- Released: August 3, 2018
- Genres: Film soundtrack; film score
- Length: 56:37
- Label: Walt Disney

Geoff Zanelli chronology
| Traffik (2018) | Christopher Robin (2018) | The Intruder (2019) |

Jon Brion chronology
| Lady Bird (2017) | Christopher Robin (2018) | Sink or Swim (2018) |

Christopher Robin (Original Motion Picture Soundtrack) is the soundtrack to the 2018 film Christopher Robin directed by Marc Forster. The album consisted of a musical score composed by Geoff Zanelli and Jon Brion, and songs written by Richard M. Sherman of the Sherman brothers duo, who occasionally collaborate for all Disney films. It was released by Walt Disney Records on August 3, 2018.

== Background ==
Jóhann Jóhannsson was initially hired as the film's composer, shortly before his death on February 9, 2018. Klaus Badelt reported to take over composing duties for Jóhannsson, the following month, but in that May, Jon Brion eventually announced as the film's composer. In July, Geoff Zanelli through his Twitter (now X) account, had announced that he would be co-composing the film score with Brion. Zak McNeil, Bryce Jacobs, Paul Mounsey, and Philip Klein provided additional music.

At an Academy event, songwriter and Disney Legend Richard M. Sherman revealed that the film would feature the iconic "Winnie the Pooh" theme, and that he was working on three new songs for the film, titled "Goodbye Farewell", "Busy Doing Nothing", and the title song, with the first one being performed by the voice cast, and the last two by Sherman. Sherman said that he found "very special to be back at the Hundred Acre Wood" as "Winnie the Pooh became a dear friend of [his] when Walt gave [to the Sherman Brothers] the assignment to write songs for the first Winnie the Pooh short film", and felt the film has "a wonderful story". Sherman said that he wrote "Busy Doing Nothing" based on the fact that "[Pooh] is always busy. Doing nothing. And he's very proud of the fact he does nothing", and said "it was fun to write". He called the song "Christopher Robin" "a sweet, nostalgic, memory of a love song between Winnie the Pooh and Christopher [Robin]", and said the lyrics "are part of the storyline [of the film]".

"Up, Down and Touch the Ground" and "The Wonderful Thing About Tiggers," both written by Richard and his brother Robert B. Sherman and performed by Cummings as Pooh and Tigger, respectively, are also included in the film. The film's soundtrack, featuring Zanelli and Brion's score, and Sherman's new songs, was released on August 3, 2018 alongside the film.

== Reception ==
Filmtracks.com assessed that "When you step back from this soundtrack, you get the feeling that it could have been coordinated so much more effectively had its production process gone smoothly. The result effectively serves its purpose, but there are melodic opportunities missed and the Sherman involvement seems token. The recording is also rather mundane, with none of the improvement to the ambient depth of the concept that Zanelli had guided for Pirates of the Caribbean: Dead Men Tell No Tales. Expect the nearly hour-long album for Christopher Robin to drag significantly during its middle passages." Peter Debruge of Variety wrote: that Brion and Zanelli's themes underscored the emotions. Sandy Schaefer of Screen Rant called the score as "lively" and added that it "further serves to enrich the movie's enchanting atmosphere and mood". Justin Chang of Los Angeles Times wrote: "the lilting musical score by Jon Brion and Geoff Zanelli, surge with gentle, unforced emotion". Alonso Duralde of TheWrap wrote: "Jon Brion and Geoff Zanelli's score is charming without being overbearing". Tomris Laffly of Time Out called it as "fairytale-esque".

== Track listing ==
Christopher Robin (Original Motion Picture Soundtrack) track listing
| No. | Title | Writer(s) | Artist(s) | Length |
|---|---|---|---|---|
| 1. | "Storybook" | Geoff Zanelli | | 1:22 |
| 2. | "Goodbye, Farewell" | Richard M. Sherman | Jim Cummings, Brad Garrett, Toby Jones, Peter Capaldi, Sophie Okonedo, Nick Mohammed, and Sara Sheen | 1:19 |
| 3. | "Not Doing Nothing Anymore" | Jon Brion | | 2:49 |
| 4. | "I Would Have Liked It to Go on For a While Longer" | Zanelli; Zak McNeil | | 2:04 |
| 5. | "Chapters" | Zanelli | | 2:59 |
| 6. | "Evelyn Goes It Alone" | Zanelli; McNeil | | 2:33 |
| 7. | "Easy to Lose Your Way on a Foggy Day" | Zanelli | | 2:04 |
| 8. | "Through the Tree" | Zanelli; McNeil | | 1:25 |
| 9. | "It's Not Stress, It's Pooh" | Zanelli | | 1:28 |
| 10. | "Train Station" | Brion | | 2:28 |
| 11. | "Sussex" | Zanelli | | 1:12 |
| 12. | "Returning to the Hundred Acre Wood" | Zanelli; McNeil | | 4:26 |
| 13. | "Did You Let Me Go?" | Zanelli; McNeil | | 3:37 |
| 14. | "Swimmer or Sinker" | Zanelli; McNeil | | 2:11 |
| 15. | "Heffalump Battle" | Brion | | 1:30 |
| 16. | "Is It Christopher Robin?" | Zanelli; Bryce Jacobs; McNeil | | 1:40 |
| 17. | "But I Found You, Didn't I?" | Zanelli; Brion; Jacobs | | 2:35 |
| 18. | "Madeline's Red Balloon" | Zanelli | | 0:54 |
| 19. | "Expotition to London" | Zanelli; Brion; Paul Mounsey | | 4:14 |
| 20. | "Nothing Ever Bad Came from Bouncing" | Zanelli; Brion; Mounsey | | 1:40 |
| 21. | "A Father of Very Little Brain" | Zanelli; McNeil | | 3:34 |
| 22. | "My Favorite Day" | Zanelli; Brion; Philip Klein | | 2:43 |
| 23. | "I Do Nothing Every Day" | Zanelli | | 2:57 |
| 24. | "Busy Doing Nothing" | Sherman | Sherman | 0:45 |
| 25. | "Christopher Robin" | Sherman | Sherman | 1:18 |
| Total length: | | | | 56:37 |

== Personnel ==
- Music composer and producer – Geoff Zanelli, Jon Brion
- Additional music – Bryce Jacobs, Paul Mounsey, Philip Klein, Zak McNeil
- Score recordist – Adam Olmstead, Keith Ukrisna, Kevin Globerman,
- Recording – Dennis Sands, Greg Koller
- Mixing – Dennis Sands, Greg Koller, Brian Malouf
- Mastering – Patricia Sullivan
- Music editor – Eric Caudieux, Ramiro Belgardt
- Supervising music editor – Jon Mooney
- Technical assistance – Aisyah Zulkarain, Nicolas Salinardi

Orchestra

- Orchestration – Bruce Fowler, David Slonaker, Edgardo Simone, Ed Trybek, Jennifer Hammond, Kevin Kaska, Philip Klein, Rick Giovinazzo, Steve Bartek, Yvonne S. Moriarty
- Conductor – Peter Rotter, Tim Williams
- Contractor – Encompass Music Partners, Gina Zimmitti
- Assistant contractor – Emma Vivian, Whitney Martin
- Concertmaster – Bruce Dukov
- Concertmistress – Belinda Broughton
- Music preparation – Booker White, JoAnn Kane Music Service, Josef Zimmermann, Walt Disney Music Library

Instruments

- Bassoons – Damian Montano, Kenneth Munday, William May, Rose Corrigan
- Booth operator – Bruce Fowler, Zak McNeil
- Cellos – Adrienne Woods, Armen Ksajikian, Ben Lash, Cecilia Tsan, Charlie Tyler, Eric Byers, Giovanna Clayton, Jacob Braun, Jacob Szekely, Michael Kaufman, Paula Hochhalter, Ross Gasworth, Simone Vitucci, Tim Loo, Steve Erdody
- Clarinets – Donald Foster, Josh Ranz, Stuart Clark
- Double Basses – Geoff Osika, Ian Walker, Michael Valerio, Oscar Hidalgo, Thomas Harte, Ed Meares, David Parmeter, Drew Dembowski, Edward Meares, Geoffrey Osika, Stephen Dress, Thomas Harte, Michael Valerio
- French horns – Allen Fogle, Andrew Bain, Daniel Kelley, Jenny Kim, Laura Brenes, Mark Adams, Teag Reaves, David Everson, Dylan Hart
- Flutes – Jenni Olson, Johanna Borenstein, Geri Rotella, Heather Clark
- Guitar – Bryson Jacobs
- Harps – Katie Kirkpatrick, Marcia Dickstein
- Keyboards – Robert Thies, Randy Kerber
- Midi transcription – Darren McKenzie
- Oboes – Chis Bleth, Lara Wickes, Jessica Pearlman, Leslie Reed
- Percussion – Brian Kilgore, Pete Korpela, Bob Zimmitti
- Timpani – Greg Goodall
- Trombones – William Reichenbach, Phillip Keen, Steven Holtman, Bill Booth, Alexander Iles
- Trumpets – Rob Schaer, Jon Lewis
- Tubas – Gary Hickman, Doug Tornquist, Greg Huckins
- Violas – Aaron Oltman, Alma Fernandez, Andrew Duckles, Caroline Buckman, Carolyn Riley, David Walther, Diana Wade, Erik Rynearson, Zach Dellinger, Jonathan Moerschel, Luke Maurer, Matthew Funes, Meredith Crawford, Rob Brophy, Shawn Mann, Brian Dembow
- Violins – Amy Hershberger, Amy Wickman, Ana Landauer, Andrew Bulbrook, Benjamin Powell, Benjamin Jacobson, Carol Pool, Charlie Bisharat, Daphne Chen, Eun-Mee Ahn, Grace Oh, Heather Powell, Helen Nightengale, Ina Veli, Irina Voloshina, Jackie Brand, Jessica Guideri, Joel Pargman, Josefina Vergara, Julie Gigante, Katie Sloan, Kevin Connolly, Kevin Kumar, Lisa Liu, Lorand Lokuszta, Lorenz Gamma, Luanne Homzy, Lucia Micarelli, Maia Jasper, Marisa Sorajja, Marisa Kuney, Mark Robertson, Natalie Leggett, Neel Hammond, Neil Samples, Nina Evtuhov, Paul Cartwright, Phillip Levy, Radu Pieptea, Rafael Rishik, Rhea Fowler, Roberto Cani, Roger Wilkie, Sara Parkins, Sarah Thornblade, Serena McKinney, Songa Lee, Tamara Hatwan, Tereza Stanislav, Alyssa Park

== Charts ==
Chart performance for Christopher Robin (Original Motion Picture Soundtrack)
| Chart (2018) | Peak position |
|---|---|
| UK Soundtrack Albums (OCC) | 38 |

== Accolades ==
Accolades for Christopher Robin (Original Motion Picture Soundtrack)
| Awards | Category | Nominee | Result | Ref. |
|---|---|---|---|---|
| International Film Music Critics Association | Best Original Score for a Comedy Film | Geoff Zanelli and Jon Brion | Nominated | |
