= Crytzer =

Crytzer is a surname. Notable people with the surname include:

- Glenn Crytzer (born 1980), American jazz band leader, composer, guitarist, banjoist, and singer
- Katherine A. Crytzer (born 1984), American judge
