= Detective Pikachu =

Detective Pikachu may refer to:

- Detective Pikachu (video game), a video game for the Nintendo 3DS
  - Detective Pikachu Returns, sequel to Detective Pikachu for the Nintendo Switch
- Detective Pikachu (film), a 2019 fantasy film directed by Rob Letterman
  - Detective Pikachu (soundtrack), a 2019 soundtrack album for the eponymous film

== See also ==
- Pikachu, a Pokémon character
- Pikachu (disambiguation)
