= Picacho =

Picacho may refer to:

== Places ==
=== Mexico ===
- Villa de Hidalgo, San Luis Potosí
- Picacho del Diablo, Baja California

=== Panama ===
- Picacho Mountain

=== United States ===
- Picacho, California
  - Picacho State Recreation Area
- Little Picacho Wilderness, California
- Picacho, Arizona
- Picacho Peak State Park, Arizona
  - Battle of Picacho Pass
- Picacho, New Mexico

=== Venezuela ===
- Picacho de El Volcán, Miranda

== Music ==
- "Picacho", a song by Young Thug

== See also ==
- Pikachu (disambiguation)
- El Picacho (disambiguation)
