= Detective Pikachu (soundtrack) =

Pokémon Detective Pikachu (Original Motion Picture Soundtrack)

Soundtrack album by Henry Jackman
- Released: May 8, 2019
- Studios: Air Studios, London, England
- Genre: Film score
- Length: 58:15
- Labels: WaterTower; Sony Classical
- Producer: Henry Jackman

Henry Jackman chronology
| Io (2019) | Pokémon Detective Pikachu (Original Motion Picture Soundtrack) (2019) | American Skin (2019) |

Pokémon Detective Pikachu (Original Motion Picture Soundtrack) is the score album to the 2019 film of the same name, based on the Pokémon franchise, and the loose adaptation of the 2016 video game series of the same name. The score, composed by Henry Jackman, featured 27 tracks and was released digitally by WaterTower Music and Sony Classical Records on May 8, 2019, and on physical formats on May 10, coinciding with the film's United States theatrical release. The film also includes the original song "Carry On" by Kygo and Rita Ora, which was issued as a standalone single but was not featured on the score album; it was released independently by RCA Records on April 19. The score is included as a part of Jackman's score catalog acquired by Reservoir Media in March 2022.

== Development ==
Henry Jackman composed the film's score, in his third collaboration with Rob Letterman after working together on Monsters vs. Aliens (2009) and Gulliver's Travels (2010). He called the music writing process as "immensely fun" and further added "The film itself was a unique invitation to create a new musical world representing all the wonderful and colorful characters of the Pokémon universe. I really enjoyed using many different sonic colors so, if you listen carefully, you can hear everything from the full symphony orchestra to analog vintage synths", although Bustle called the soundtrack as "heavy on electronic dance music". Letterman helped Jackman to bring his Roland TR-808 drum machine for the film score, but they could not use it as it "was faulty and damaged". Besides composing the score, Jackman arranged Junichi Masuda's "Red & Blue Theme" (used from previous Pokémon media) for the film's end credits, but was not included in the score soundtrack.

Kygo and Rita Ora released a standalone single for the film, titled "Carry On". The song and its accompanying music video were released on April 19, 2019. A remixed version of the song, is performed by Dutch DJ Nicky Romero. Honest Boyz also collaborated with Lil Uzi Vert to make another song for the film, titled "Electricity" and produced by Pharrell Williams, which also plays over the end credits. Reservoir Media acquired all of Jackman's score in March 2022, including his work for Detective Pikachu.

== Track listing ==
Credits adapted from Tidal.

| No. | Title | Length |
|---|---|---|
| 1. | "Mewtwo Awakes" | 1:19 |
| 2. | "Catching a Cubone" | 2:05 |
| 3. | "Bad News" | 1:17 |
| 4. | "Howard Clifford" | 0:56 |
| 5. | "Ryme City" | 2:11 |
| 6. | "A Key to the Past" | 2:06 |
| 7. | "Aipom Attack" | 1:58 |
| 8. | "On the Case" | 1:26 |
| 9. | "Childhood Memories" | 1:42 |
| 10. | "Buddies" | 1:08 |
| 11. | "The Interrogation of Mr. Mime" | 1:53 |
| 12. | "The Roundhouse" | 1:50 |
| 13. | "Pikachu vs. Charizard" | 3:06 |
| 14. | "Embrace" | 3:07 |
| 15. | "Digging Deeper" | 3:55 |
| 16. | "Unauthorized Access" | 3:38 |
| 17. | "Greninja & Torterra" | 2:59 |
| 18. | "The Forest of Healing" | 3:53 |
| 19. | "Shock to the System" | 1:19 |
| 20. | "Save the City" | 1:07 |
| 21. | "True Colors" | 2:11 |
| 22. | "Merge to One" | 2:08 |
| 23. | "Game On" | 1:05 |
| 24. | "Ditto Battle" | 2:26 |
| 25. | "Howard Unplugged" | 2:35 |
| 26. | "Epiphany" | 2:22 |
| 27. | "Together" | 2:20 |
| Total length: | | 58:15 |

== Additional music ==
Additional songs that were played in the film are as follows:

- "Le Fantôme de Saint Bechet" performed by Glenn Crytzer's Savoy Seven
- "Payin No Mind" by Glen Crytzer And His Syncopaters
- "GOH" featuring What So Not, Skrillex and KLP
- "Kyoto Mist" by David Wahler
- "Jigglypuff" by Rachael Lillis
- "Pokémon Theme" (also known as "Gotta Catch 'Em All"), performed by Ryan Reynolds. The instrumental of the original song also plays in the film.

== Reception ==
Casey Cipriani, writing for Bustle, called the soundtrack as "fun and boppy" while also adding "it keeps you in Ryme City long after you leave the movie theater". Karen Han of Polygon called it as "a rollicking, riotously fun soundtrack, as befitting the surprisingly terrific movie." Filmtracks.com criticised the score, saying "it lacks the cohesive narrative and genuine heart of the far more effective Wreck-It Ralph scores, seeming like a cheap knock-off of the same environment whenever the electronics are incorporated. Those looking for robust orchestral action may be moderately intrigued by the suspense and action sequences here, but they are too few and too disjointed to merit a recommendation." CNET called Jackman's score as "catchy", while Umesh Punwani of Koimoi wrote that Jackman's "absorbing background score matches up to the dazzling visuals on screen".

== Personnel ==
Credits adapted from CD liner

- Composer – Henry Jackman
- Record Producer – Henry Jackman, Maverick Dugger
- Additional Producer – Evan Goldman, Jeff Morrow, Kazuma Jinnouchi
- Bassoon – Gavin McNaughton, Rachel Simms, Richard Skinner
- Cello – Anthony Lewis, Chris Worsey, Hetty Snell, Ian Burdge, Nick Cooper, Paul Kegg, Tim Gill, Tony Wollard, Vicky Matthews, Caroline Dale
- Clarinet – Anthony Pike, Dave Fuest, Duncan Ashby, Jon Carnac
- Cor Anglais – Janey Miller
- Double Bass – Allen Walley, Andy Marshall, Richard Pryce, Steve Williams, Steve Mair, Mary Scully
- Flute – Anna Noakes, Karen Jones
- French Horn – David Pyatt, Michael Thompson, Nigel Black, Philip Eastop, Richard Berry, Richard Watkins, Simon Rayner
- Harp – Skaila Kanga
- Oboe – David Thomas, Matthew Draper, Janey Miller
- Percussion – Frank Ricotti, Gary Kettel, Paul Clarvis
- Piano – David Hartley
- Piccolo Flute – Helen Keen
- Trombone – Andy Wood, Barry Clements, Byron Fulcher, Dave Stewart, Ed Tarrant, Peter Moore, Tracey Holloway
- Trumpet – Daniel Newell, Jason Evans, Kate Moore, Philip Cobb
- Tuba, Trombone [Cimbasso] – Owen Slade
- Viola – Andy Parker, Annie Beilby, Fiona Bonds, Fiona Winning, Helen Kamminga, Julia Knight, Kate Musker, Martin Humbey, Max Baillie, Peter Lale, Reiad Chibah, Bruce White
- Violin – Alison Dods, Boguslaw Kostecki, Cathy Thompson, Clio Gould, Dai Emanuel, Daniel Bhattacharya, Emlyn Singleton, Ian Humphries, Jackie Shave, Jackie Hartley, Jenny Sacha, Marianne Haynes, Mark Berrow, Martin Burgess, Martyn Jackson, Matt Ward, Natalia Bonner, Nicky Sweeney, Ollie Heath, Oli Langford, Patrick Kiernan, Perry Montague-Mason, Richard George, Rick Koster, Roger Garland, Thom Gould, Tom Pigott-Smith, Everton Nelson, Steve Morris
- Orchestrated By – Andrew Kinney, Stephen Coleman
- Additional Orchestrations – Ed Trybek, Henri Wilkinson, Jonathan Beard
- Orchestra Leader – Everton Nelson
- Orchestra Contractor– Lucy Whalley
- Score Conductor – Gavin Greenaway
- Music Coordinator – Jane Berry
- Music Supervisor – Margaret Yen, Peter Afterman, Alison Litton
- Copyist (Music Preparation) – Jill Streator
- Pro Tools Recordist – Chris Barrett
- Music Editor – Pete 'Oso' Snell
- Score Editor – John Chapman
- Recording Engineer – Nick Wollage, Alex Ferguson, Jack Mills
- Technical Engineers – Felipe Pacheco, John Paul Lefebvre, Maverick Dugger
- Mixed By – Chris Fogel
- Legal Business Affairs – Mark Cavell
- Music Assistance – Allison Swift, Michaela Green
- Product Development – Guido Eitberger
- Music Production Services – Matthew Kusell Justmann
- Studio Manager – Alison Burton

== Chart performance ==
| Chart (2019) | Peak position |
|---|---|
| Japanese Soundtrack Albums (Billboard) | 24 |
| UK Soundtrack Albums (OCC) | 39 |
| US Billboard 200 | 88 |
| US Soundtrack Albums (Billboard) | 24 |

== Release history ==
| Region | Date | Format(s) | Label | Ref. |
|---|---|---|---|---|
| Worldwide | May 8, 2019 | Streaming; digital download | WaterTower Music; Sony Classical | |
| United States | May 10, 2019 | CD | Sony Classical | |
| United States | July 26, 2019 | Vinyl | Sony Classical | |
| Japan | June 5, 2019 | CD | Sony Music Entertainment Japan | |
