= Lady Bird (soundtrack) =

Soundtrack to the 2017 film

Lady Bird (Original Motion Picture Soundtrack)

Film score by Jon Brion
- Released: November 17, 2017
- Genre: Film score
- Length: 27:13
- Label: Lakeshore
- Producer: Jon Brion

Jon Brion chronology
Wilson (2017)	Lady Bird (2017)	Christopher Robin (2018)

Lady Bird (Original Motion Picture Soundtrack) is the soundtrack to the 2017 film of the same name directed by Greta Gerwig. Featuring musical score composed by Jon Brion, the soundtrack was released by Lakeshore Records on November 17, 2017 digitally, followed by a vinyl release on February 23, 2018. An album consisting pre-recorded music heard in the film was released on January 12, 2018 by Sony Music Entertainment.

== Development ==
Gerwig approached Jon Brion to score music for the film, after she liked some of his works, though could not mention a specific film. While watching the film, Brion thought that Gerwig "perfectly captures a certain very specific, bittersweet feeling in the movie" which resonated with him in the "sense of sympathy and understanding". He did not want a film score of "just strings", and so only makes use of wind ensembles, woodwind being his favorite section of the orchestra, adding "Once in a while, someone who plays oboe is allowed to play the melody, that’s how it gets used most of the time! And the sound of a wind ensemble is something really beautiful I think."

The main theme consisted of an ascending piano line with the wind ensemble playing referred to the "falling down" quality as the rhythm was pushing it forward. Later he did a version which goes up a few notes and drops down and the process goes on which was considered of an "emotional Escher painting". He further went on with electro-acoustic treatment that involved multiple contact pickups, however, he involved PA speakers at different spots around the room and under the piano, to essentially make the piano feedback melodiously and not squealing. He had used some guitar pedals and things while recording the score.

Much of the themes had been written when Gerwig and Brion watched the film together, and also played live for Gerwig. Thereafter, he would record the music he had written at his studio. Most of the sessions were held at Rhythm United in Hollywood, Los Angeles, which was considered his favorite and there was a set up of several room mics, which used to employ numerous effects and things fed back underneath the piano, apart from the natural piano sounds.

== Track listing ==
No.	Title	Length
1.	"Title Credits"	1:47
2.	"Sign Up"	0:49
3.	"Drive Home"	0:42
4.	"Lb / Danny"	0:16
5.	"Pick Up"	0:31
6.	"Lady Bird Kiss"	1:45
7.	"Rose Garden"	1:42
8.	"Lb Steals Math Grade Book"	0:24
9.	"Thanksgiving in Sacramento"	0:51
10.	"Coffee Shop"	0:34
11.	"Hope"	0:49
12.	"More Hope"	1:41
13.	"Consolation"	1:18
14.	"Hope Against Hope"	1:09
15.	"Model Homes"	0:45
16.	"Maybe"	0:35
17.	"Looking Forward"	0:25
18.	"Summer in Sacramento"	1:18
19.	"Packing Up"	1:16
20.	"Leaving"	1:22
21.	"Hope?"	0:40
22.	"Reconcile"	1:24
23.	"Lady Bird"	5:10
Total length:		27:13

== Reception ==
Sasha Geffen of Pitchfork rated 7.3/10 to the album, saying "Using piano, strings, a wind ensemble, and light percussion, Brion’s score subtly and deftly mirrors the existential ambling of Greta Gerwig’s outstanding coming-of-age film." Chris Ingalls of PopMatters wrote "As a film’s musical accompaniment, this kind of approach works beautifully. As a solitary listening experience, there may not be a ton of hooks that stick with you long after the music is over, but it still works as a rather sumptuous collection of melodies that give you a peek into the musical world of Jon Brion." Alissa Wilkinson of Vox commented the score as "joyful" and "buoyant", while Eric Kohn of IndieWire and Peter Travers of Rolling Stone called it as "soulful" and "just-right". Jason Lithgo of The Film Magazine wrote "Jon Brion manages to somehow illustrate to us this range of human emotion through his score, which is both melancholic and uplifting, often switching between some sort of John Hughes/Talking Heads inspired new wave and thoughtful instrumental work."

== Curated soundtrack ==
Lady Bird (Soundtrack from the Motion Picture)

Soundtrack album by various artists
- Released: January 12, 2018
- Length: 52:53
- Label: Sony Music

A soundtrack consisted of the songs heard in the film was released on January 12, 2018 by Sony Music Entertainment.

No.	Title	Artist(s)	Length
1.	"Prayer of St. Francis" (From St. Francis Hymn)	Beanie Feldstein	0:20
2.	"Hand in My Pocket"	Alanis Morissette	3:38
3.	"Little of Your Love"	Haim	3:32
4.	"Panis Angelicus"	Adolf Fredrik Girls Choir	3:33
5.	"It's Given to Me – By Me" (dialogue)	Saoirse Ronan	0:09
6.	"Days of Steam"	John Cale	1:58
7.	"As We Go Along"	The Monkees	3:52
8.	"Center of Attention" (dialogue)	Feldstein	0:04
9.	"Overture"	Merrily We Roll Along Orchestra; Paul Gemignani	3:52
10.	"Crash into Me"	Dave Matthews Band	5:13
11.	"Happy Birthday"	Altered Images	2:58
12.	"City College" (dialogue)	Laurie Metcalf	0:10
13.	"Snoop Dog, Baby"	Reel Big Fish	3:25
14.	"Always See Your Face"	Love	3:19
15.	"The Nutcracker Ballet, Op. 71: No. 13. Waltz of the Flowers" (Excerpt)	Leonard Slatkin	2:09
16.	"This Eve of Parting"	John Hartford	2:32
17.	"Wrong Side of the Tracks" (dialogue)	Lucas Hedges	0:13
18.	"Little Plastic Castle"	Ani Difranco	4:03
19.	"Tha Crossroads"	Bone Thugs-n-Harmony	3:43
20.	"Rosa Mystica"	The University Of Notre Dame Folk Choir	3:57
21.	"Let's Just Sit" (dialogue)	Metcalf	0:13
Total length:			52:53
