= El Picacho =

El Picacho is a common geographic name in Latin America, usually in reference to a mountain peak, and may refer to:

- El Picacho (Panama)
- The hill on which Christ at El Picacho stands
- El Picacho Formation
- There are several peaks within Baja California named El Picacho

== See also ==
- Picacho (disambiguation)
