= Pikachu (disambiguation) =

Pikachu is one of the species of Pokémon creatures from the Pokémon media franchise, as well as its mascot.

Pikachu may also refer to:

== Entertainment ==
- Pokémon Pikachu, a series of portable Pokémon digital pets
- Pokémon Yellow, also known as Pikachu edition, a first-generation Pokémon game
- Detective Pikachu (video game), a 2016 video game
- Detective Pikachu (film), a 2019 film directed by Rob Letterman based on the video game
- Pokémon: Let's Go, Pikachu!, a remake of the first-generation Pokémon games
- "Pikachu", a song by Oliver Heldens
- "Pikachu (No Keys)", the original name for the song "Yes Indeed" by Lil Baby and Drake
- "Pikachu", a song by Yung Lean from Starz
- "PIKACHU", a song by the Kid LAROI from F*ck Love

== Other uses ==
- Pikachu (sculpture), a sculpture installed in Lower Garden District, New Orleans
- Pikachu virus, a computer virus
- Yago Pikachu (born 1992), Brazilian footballer
- MC Pikachu (born 1999), Brazilian singer
- Ricardo Pietreczko, German professional darts player nicknamed "Pikachu"
- John Lee Ka-chiu, chief executive of Hong Kong nicknamed "Pikachu" by the opposition

== See also ==
- Detective Pikachu (disambiguation)
- Picacho (disambiguation)
- Pika, a small, mountain-dwelling mammal
- Pikchu, a mountain in Peru
