= National Board of Review Awards 2017 =

Annual US film awards ceremony

89th NBR Awards
Best Film: The Post

The 89th National Board of Review Awards, honoring the best in film for 2017, were announced on November 28, 2017.

== Top 10 Films ==
Films listed alphabetically except top, which is ranked as Best Film of the Year:

The Post

- Baby Driver
- Call Me by Your Name
- The Disaster Artist
- Downsizing
- Dunkirk
- The Florida Project
- Get Out
- Lady Bird
- Logan
- Phantom Thread

== Winners ==
Best Film:

- The Post

Best Director:

- Greta Gerwig – Lady Bird

Best Actor:

- Tom Hanks – The Post

Best Actress:

- Meryl Streep – The Post

Best Supporting Actor:

- Willem Dafoe – The Florida Project

Best Supporting Actress:

- Laurie Metcalf – Lady Bird

Best Original Screenplay:

- Paul Thomas Anderson – Phantom Thread

Best Adapted Screenplay:

- Scott Neustadter and Michael H. Weber – The Disaster Artist

Best Animated Feature:

- Coco

Best Foreign Language Film:

- Foxtrot

Best Documentary:

- Jane

Best Ensemble:

- Get Out

Breakthrough Performance:

- Timothée Chalamet – Call Me by Your Name

Best Directorial Debut:

- Jordan Peele – Get Out

Spotlight Award:

- Wonder Woman – Patty Jenkins and Gal Gadot

NBR Freedom of Expression:

- First They Killed My Father
- Let It Fall: Los Angeles 1982–1992

== Top Foreign Films ==
Foxtrot

- A Fantastic Woman
- Frantz
- Loveless
- The Square
- Summer 1993

== Top Documentaries ==
Jane

- Abacus: Small Enough to Jail
- Brimstone & Glory
- Eric Clapton: Life in 12 Bars
- Faces Places
- Hell on Earth: The Fall of Syria and the Rise of ISIS

== Top Independent Films ==
- Beatriz at Dinner
- Brigsby Bear
- A Ghost Story
- Lady Macbeth
- Logan Lucky
- Loving Vincent
- Menashe
- Norman
- Patti Cake$
- Wind River
