= Glenn Crytzer =

American musician

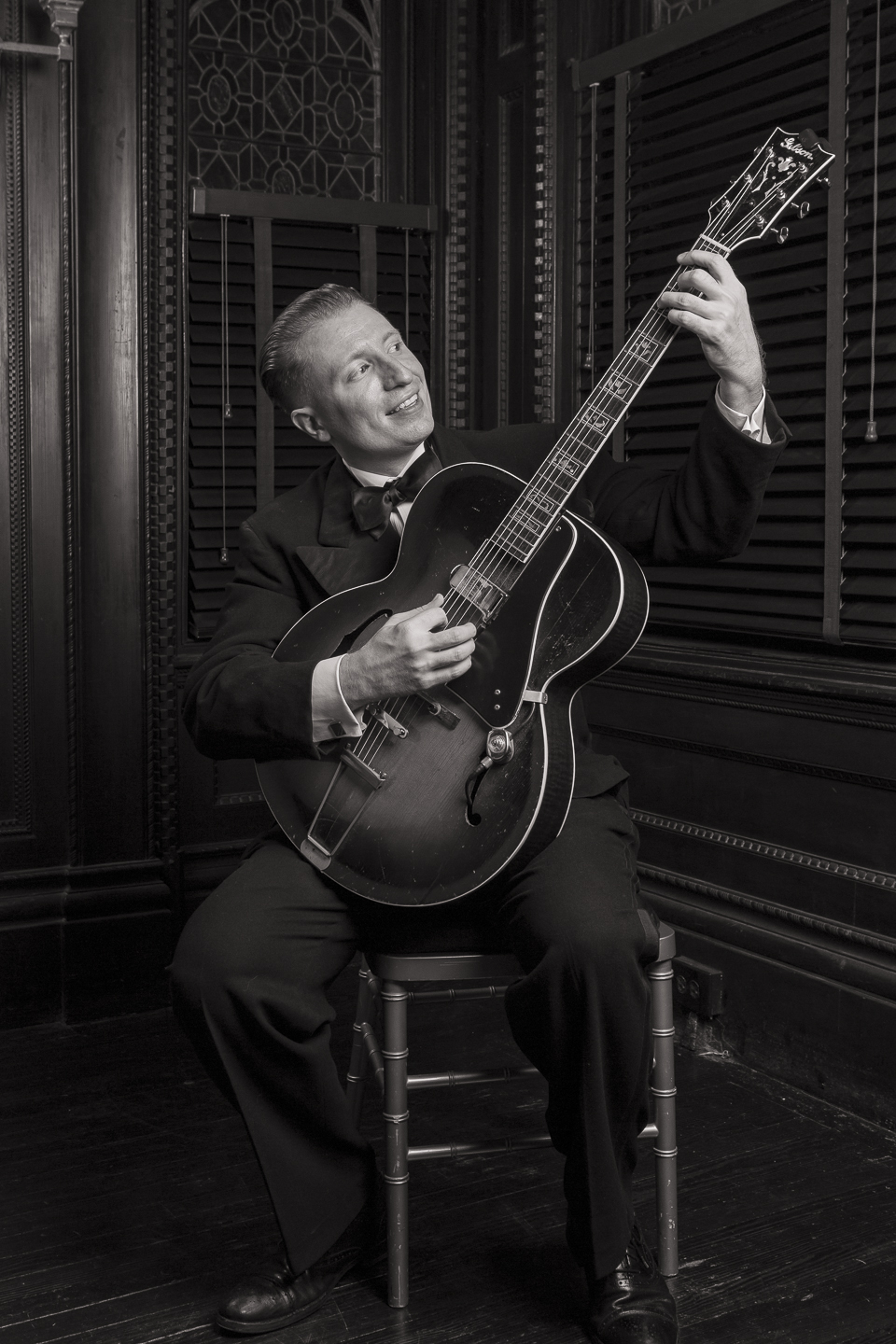

Background information
- Born: Glenn Crytzer; October 13, 1980; Butler, Pennsylvania, U.S.
- Genres: Orchestral jazz, swing, big band
- Occupations: bandleader, guitarist, composer, arranger
- Instruments: Guitar, banjo, vocal
- Years active: 2006–present
- Website: glenncrytzer.com

Glenn Crytzer (born October 13, 1980) is an American jazz band leader, composer, guitarist, banjoist, and singer.

== Career ==
Crytzer's music features prominently in several films, including the documentaries Old Fashioned: The Story of the Wisconsin Supper Club (2015) and Alive and Kicking (2016). The track "Could This Be Love?", from the Savoy Seven album Uptown Jump, was used in the soundtrack to the Disney fantasy film Christopher Robin (2018).

== Influences ==
Crytzer's influences include Benny Goodman, Count Basie, Chick Webb, Charlie Christian, Jimmie Lunceford, Louis Armstrong, Fats Waller, Bix Beiderbecke, Duke Ellington, Cab Calloway, Jimmy Rushing, and the other "greats" of the 1920s, 30s, and 40s. Rather than solely copying the work of others, however, Crytzer strives to create his own sound within the vintage style, composing and arranging new material that sounds authentic to the period.

== Discography ==
- Chasin' The Blues (2009)
- Harlem Mad (2011)
- Skinny Minne (2012)
- Focus Pocus (2013)
- A Little Love This Christmas (2013)
- Uptown Jump (2015)
- Aint' It Grand? (2018)
- Underneath the Mistletoe (2019)
