= Lady Bird (film) =

2017 film by Greta Gerwig

- Theatrical release poster
- Directed by: Greta Gerwig
- Written by: Greta Gerwig
- Produced by: Scott Rudin; Eli Bush; Evelyn O'Neill
- Starring: Saoirse Ronan; Laurie Metcalf; Tracy Letts; Lucas Hedges; Timothée Chalamet; Beanie Feldstein; Stephen McKinley Henderson; Lois Smith
- Cinematography: Sam Levy
- Edited by: Nick Houy
- Music by: Jon Brion
- Production companies: Scott Rudin Productions; Management 360; IAC Films
- Distributed by: A24 (United States and Canada); Focus Features (International; through Universal Pictures)
- Release dates: September 1, 2017 (Telluride); November 3, 2017 (United States)
- Running time: 94 minutes
- Country: United States
- Language: English
- Budget: $10 million
- Box office: $79 million

Lady Bird is a 2017 American coming-of-age comedy drama film written and directed by Greta Gerwig in her solo directorial debut, starring Saoirse Ronan, Laurie Metcalf, Tracy Letts, Lucas Hedges, Timothée Chalamet, Beanie Feldstein, Stephen McKinley Henderson, and Lois Smith. Set in Sacramento, California, during the early 2000s, it focuses on a high school senior who has a turbulent relationship with her mother.

Filming for Lady Bird took place from August to October 2016 in California and New York. It premiered at the 44th Telluride Film Festival on September 1, 2017, and was released theatrically in the United States on November 3, 2017, by A24, grossing $79 million, becoming their highest-grossing film at the time. The film received widespread critical acclaim, with high praise drawn to Gerwig's screenplay and direction, and the performances of Ronan and Metcalf. It is considered by many critics as one of the best films of 2017 and one of the best films of the 2010s and the 21st century. Lady Bird was chosen by the National Board of Review, the American Film Institute, and Time magazine as one of the top ten films of 2017. At the 90th Academy Awards, it earned five nominations: Best Picture, Best Actress (for Ronan), Best Supporting Actress (for Metcalf), Best Original Screenplay, and Best Director. At the 75th Golden Globe Awards, the film won two awards—Best Motion Picture (Musical or Comedy) and Best Actress in a Musical or Comedy (for Ronan)—and was nominated for two others. It was also nominated for three British Academy Film Awards. The film was released with a soundtrack.

== Plot ==
In the fall of 2002, Christine McPherson, who calls herself "Lady Bird", is a senior at a Catholic high school (Note: Christine attends an all-girls Catholic school which has an adjoining Catholic boys' high school, with which the students participate in co-educational activities.) in Sacramento, California. Despite her family's financial struggles, she longs to attend a prestigious college in "a city with culture" on the East Coast. When Lady Bird's mother Marion tells her that she is ungrateful and her dreams are unrealistic, Lady Bird jumps from the moving car, breaking her arm.

Lady Bird and her best friend Julie join their school's theater program where Lady Bird meets her new boyfriend Danny. She spends her last Thanksgiving before graduation with Danny's wealthy family instead of her mother. When Lady Bird catches Danny kissing a boy, she breaks up with him. Marion convinces Lady Bird to earn money working at a coffee shop. She tries to become more popular by bonding with popular students Kyle and Jenna, exaggerating her family's wealth and vandalizing a nun's car with Jenna. She reconciles with Danny after he apologizes and expresses his fear of coming out. Lady Bird leaves the theater program and spends less time with Julie.

Lady Bird's new relationships begin to fall apart. After she is suspended from school for heckling a guest speaker at an anti-abortion assembly, Jenna discovers Lady Bird had lied about Danny's grandmother's house being hers. Lady Bird kisses Kyle at a party, and they confess to being virgins. After they have sex, Kyle admits he lied about his virginity then attempts to gaslight Lady Bird into thinking he didn't. Lady Bird seeks comfort from her mother, and Marion provides it unconditionally.

Marion begs Lady Bird to apply to California colleges, revealing Lady Bird's father, Larry, has lost his job and can't afford out-of-state tuition. Larry secretly encourages her to apply to her dream schools, resolving to refinance their home mortgage if necessary. Lady Bird is dismayed to learn that her presumptive destination is UC Davis, only half an hour away. She is waitlisted for a university in New York City, but does not tell Marion.

On prom night, Kyle, Jenna, and Jenna's boyfriend skip the prom in favor of a house party. Lady Bird visits Julie instead. They rekindle their friendship and go to prom together. Lady Bird's family take her to a restaurant to celebrate. Danny runs into them and accidentally reveals the waitlist to Marion. Lady Bird gets the silent treatment from her mother for the remainder of the summer, and when she is accepted and her parents drop her off at the airport to leave for New York, Marion refuses to say goodbye.

In New York, Lady Bird finds several heartfelt, unfinished letters from Marion in her luggage, secretly collected by Larry from the trash. Lady Bird is touched and readopts her given name, Christine. She's hospitalized after drinking heavily at a college party, and attends a local church after discharge (Note: Although the scene does not explicitly indicate any particular faith tradition, the church scene was filmed at the First Presbyterian Church in Lower Manhattan.) where she is moved to tears. Christine calls home and leaves a message for her mother, apologizing and thanking her for all of her help.

== Cast ==
- Saoirse Ronan as Christine "Lady Bird" McPherson (Note: The nickname does not derive from former First Lady Lady Bird Johnson, but the Mother Goose nursery rhyme Ladybird Ladybird.)
- Laurie Metcalf as Marion McPherson
- Tracy Letts as Larry McPherson
- Lucas Hedges as Daniel "Danny" O'Neill
- Timothée Chalamet as Kyle Scheible
- Beanie Feldstein as Julianne "Julie" Steffans
- Lois Smith as Sister Sarah Joan
- Stephen McKinley Henderson as Father Leviatch
- Odeya Rush as Jenna Walton
- Jordan Rodrigues as Miguel McPherson
- Marielle Scott as Shelly Yuhan
- Jake McDorman as Mr. Bruno
- John Karna as Greg Anrue
- Bayne Gibby as Casey Kelly
- Laura Marano as Diana Greenway
- Kristen Cloke as Ms Steffans
- Andy Buckley as Matt
- Kathryn Newton as Darlene Bell
- Daniel Zovatto as Jonah Ruiz

== Production ==
=== Development ===
Gerwig spent years writing the screenplay for "Lady Bird". At one point, it was over 350 pages long and had the working title Mothers and Daughters. In 2015, Gerwig and her team secured financing from IAC Films, who produced the film alongside Scott Rudin Productions. Gerwig's manager, Evelyn O'Neill, also served as a producer.

Although the film has been described as "semi-autobiographical", Gerwig has said that "nothing in the movie literally happened in my life, but it has a core of truth that resonates with what I know". To prepare the cast and crew, Gerwig gave them her old high-school yearbooks, photos, and journals, as well as passages written by Joan Didion, and she took them on a tour of her hometown. She told Sam Levy, the director of photography on the film, that she wanted it to feel "like a memory," and said that she "sought to offer a female counterpart to tales like The 400 Blows and Boyhood." The film was Gerwig's first as a solo director, though she had previously co-written and co-directed Nights and Weekends with Joe Swanberg in 2008.

=== Casting ===
In September 2015, Gerwig met with Saoirse Ronan at the Toronto International Film Festival, where they were promoting Maggie's Plan and Brooklyn, respectively. They read through the script in a hotel room, with Ronan reading the part of Lady Bird, and Gerwig reading the other characters. Gerwig realized, by the second page of the reading, that Ronan was the right choice for the title role. In January 2016, Ronan was cast. Gerwig met with Lucas Hedges and offered him his choice of the male parts. He chose Danny. Gerwig cast Laurie Metcalf after watching her theater work, while the rest of the cast, including Tracy Letts, Timothée Chalamet, Beanie Feldstein, John Karna and Jordan Rodrigues, was announced in September 2016.

=== Filming ===
Principal photography was scheduled to begin in March 2016, but was delayed to August because of Ronan's commitments to a Broadway production of The Crucible. Filming began in Sacramento, California on August 30, 2016, for one week. Five weeks were spent on location in Los Angeles, with additional shooting in New York City, and filming wrapped on October 1, 2016. Originally, Gerwig wanted to shoot the film on Super 16 film, but due to budget constraints, she ultimately shot on the Arri Alexa Mini. In post-production, the filmmakers emphasized digital noise, to create the effect of a copy of a photograph.

Ronan dyed her hair red for the role and did not wear makeup to cover her acne, viewing the film as "an opportunity to let a teenager's face in a movie actually look like a teenager's face in real life". To put the cast and crew at ease by knowing exactly how the day would run, Gerwig, using a technique she learned from filmmaker Rebecca Miller, arrived an hour before everyone else. She also banned cell phones on the set, which was a policy she borrowed from her partner, filmmaker Noah Baumbach.

== Release ==
In July 2017, A24 acquired worldwide distribution rights to the film. The film had its world premiere at the Telluride Film Festival on September 1, 2017, and screened at the Toronto International Film Festival on September 8, 2017, and at the New York Film Festival on October 8, 2017. Focus Features acquired international distribution rights to the film. It was released theatrically in the United States on November 3, 2017, in the United Kingdom on February 16, 2018, and in Ireland on February 23, 2018.

== Reception ==
=== Box office ===
Lady Bird grossed $49 million in the United States and Canada, and $30 million in other territories, for a worldwide total of $79 million.

In its limited opening weekend, it grossed $364,437 from four theaters, for a per-theater average of $91,109. It had the second best theater average of 2017, and the highest ever for a film in limited release directed by a woman. The film expanded to 37 theaters in its second weekend, and grossed a three-day total of $1.2 million, finishing tenth at the box office. In its third weekend, the film expanded to 238 theaters, and grossed a three-day total of $2.5 million, finishing eighth at the box office.

The film had its official wide release on November 24, playing in 724 theaters and making $4.1 million over the weekend ($5.4 million over the five-day Thanksgiving frame), finishing eleventh. Expanding to 1,194 theaters the following week the film grossed $4.3 million, returning to eighth place. Lady Bird also became A24's highest-grossing film domestically, ahead of Moonlight, which made $27.9 million. The weekend of January 27, 2018, following the announcement of the film's five Oscar nominations, it made $1.9 million (an increase over the previous week's $1.1 million).

=== Critical response ===
Lady Bird received a standing ovation at its international premiere at the Toronto International Film Festival, and was praised for Ronan and Metcalf's performances, and Gerwig's direction. On Rotten Tomatoes, the film has an approval rating of 99% based on 399 reviews, with an average rating of 8.8/10. The website's critical consensus reads "Lady Bird delivers fresh insights about the turmoil of adolescence and reveals debuting writer-director Greta Gerwig as a fully formed filmmaking talent." On November 27, 2017, it became the film with the most professional reviews to remain at 100% on the site with 164 positive reviews, beating previous record holder Toy Story 2, which had 163 positive reviews at the time. It stayed at 100% until a negative review by Cole Smithey was published; Smithey, who had previously done the same for Toy Story 3's record 100% score, later admitted he intentionally designed his review to lower its score. On Metacritic, the film has a weighted average score of 93 out of 100, based on reviews from 50 critics, indicating "universal acclaim".

A. O. Scott of The New York Times described Lady Bird as "big-screen perfection ... exceptionally well-written, full of wordplay and lively argument. Every line sounds like something a person might actually say, which means that the movie is also exceptionally well acted." Todd McCarthy of The Hollywood Reporter wrote the film was "modestly scaled but creatively ambitious" and "succeeds on its own terms as a piquant audience pleaser", and gave praise to Ronan, who he said "just seems to keep getting better all the time." Peter Debruge of Variety praised Gerwig's direction and script as well as Ronan's performance. Mick LaSalle of the San Francisco Chronicle wrote the film was "simply beautiful" and "warm and inspired", hailing the performances of Ronan and Metcalf as well as Gerwig's direction and screenplay.

The Washington Post's Ann Hornaday described the film as a "triumph of style, sensibility and spirit" while similarly praising Ronan's performance and Gerwig's direction. Peter Travers of Rolling Stone rated the film 3.5 out of four stars in which he deemed it as "simply irresistible" and complimented the film's plot and narrative while highlighting the performances of Ronan and Metcalf in which he stated as an "Oscar calling" and Gerwig's direction as "full-blown triumph". He also declared it as one of the year's best films. Richard Roeper of the Chicago Sun-Times called the film "unique and original and fresh and wonderful" and "appealing" while lauding the performances (particularly Metcalf and Letts) in which he remarked that "There's no level of acting on a higher plane than what [Metcalf] and [Letts] achieve in this film. This is what greatness looks like." Alonso Duralde of TheWrap remarked that "Gerwig the actress skillfully pivots between the wacky and the poignant, so it's no surprise that Gerwig the auteur so delicately balances hilarity and heartbreak".

In Paste, Jim Vorel argued that the film portrays an abusive maternal relationship.

== Accolades ==
Lady Bird garnered a variety of awards and nominations. The film was chosen by the National Board of Review, the American Film Institute, and Time magazine as one of the top 10 films of 2017. In 2018, Lady Bird was awarded The ReFrame Stamp in the 2017 Narrative & Animated Feature category.

At the 90th Academy Awards, it was nominated for Best Picture, Best Director and Best Original Screenplay for Gerwig, Best Actress for Ronan, and Best Actress in a Supporting Role for Metcalf. It did not win in any of the five categories in which it was nominated.

The film also received eight nominations at the 23rd Critics' Choice Awards, including Best Picture, Best Director, Best Actress, Best Supporting Actress, Best Original Screenplay, and Best Acting Ensemble. At the 75th Golden Globe Awards, it was nominated for Best Motion Picture – Musical or Comedy (won), Best Actress – Musical or Comedy for Ronan (won), Best Supporting Actress for Metcalf, and Best Screenplay. At the 24th Screen Actors Guild Awards, it was nominated for Outstanding Performance by a Female Actor in a Leading Role for Ronan, Outstanding Performance by a Female Actor in a Supporting Role for Metcalf, and Outstanding Performance by a Cast in a Motion Picture.

In a series of articles regarding the best of the 2010s in film, IndieWire ranked Lady Bird as the 10th best film of the decade. Rolling Stone ranked it 23rd, The A.V. Club ranked it 10th, Business Insider ranked it 5th, and Consequence of Sound ranked it 90th. It was the 13th most overall mentioned on best of decade lists tying with Spider-Man: Into the Spider-Verse according to Metacritic. In 2018, IndieWire writers ranked the script the eighth best American screenplay of the 21st century. The February 2020 issue of New York Magazine lists Lady Bird as among "The Best Movies That Lost Best Picture at the Oscars." In 2021, members of Writers Guild of America West (WGAW) and Writers Guild of America, East (WGAE) ranked its screenplay 16th in WGA’s 101 Greatest Screenplays of the 21st Century (so far). In June 2025, the film ranked number 39 on The New York Times' list of "The 100 Best Movies of the 21st Century" and number 36 on the "Readers' Choice" edition of the list. In July 2025, it ranked number 29 on Rolling Stone's list of "The 100 Best Movies of the 21st Century."

== Potential sequels ==
In February 2018, on an episode of The A24 Podcast, Gerwig expressed interest in making spiritual successors to Lady Bird, saying "I would like to do a quartet of Sacramento films" modeled on the Neapolitan Novels of Elena Ferrante.

== See also ==
- 2017 in film
- List of American films of 2017
- 90th Academy Awards
- 71st British Academy Film Awards
- 75th Golden Globe Awards
- 24th Screen Actors Guild Awards
- 89th National Board of Review Awards
- 23rd Critics' Choice Awards
