= Bryce Jacobs =

Australian composer, producer, and musician

Bryce Jacobs (born Bryson Kenneth Jacobs) is an Australian composer, producer and multi-instrumentalist, most famous in the composing world for his style that uses classical orchestral techniques and electronica elements, but highly infused with guitar and vocal textures.

== Early life and career ==
After completing a Bachelor of Music in Performance at the Sydney Conservatorium of Music, Jacobs returned 18 months later to complete a master's degree in composition. As he started learning the stylistic standards of both classic orchestral, jazz, and rock, he went on to design, and build, a new style of guitar. The instrument he created used twelve individual strings (not courses) and electronic pitch shifters, thereby allowing it to reach seven octaves. Shortly afterwards, Jacobs started performing as a session and touring musician for Australian artists including Josh Pyke and Genevieve Maynard, and international artists such as Sophie B. Hawkins.

In 2006, Jacobs started his film scoring work, copying parts on Happy Feet. This was then followed by work as an orchestrator on Jumper, Gabriel, Australia, and P.S. I Love You. In 2008, Bryce moved to the United States, where he started working at Hans Zimmer's company Remote Control Productions. Once there, he made a name for himself with scores that focused on achieving an orchestral approach to textualizing with guitars, most notably on the score for Rush. He also worked with composer Ramin Djawadi on numerous projects, including Clash of the Titans, Medal of Honor, Flash Forward, Prison Break, and Breakout Kings. Jacobs' first solo score was for the film Bad Karma (2012), starring Ray Liotta and Dominic Purcell, and he later collaborated with Scottish singer-songwriter, KT Tunstall, on the indie film Carried (2015). In 2017, Jacobs created the soundtrack for the Syfy adaptation of 12 Monkeys, and then for the comedy Random Tropical Paradise. In 2018, Bryce composed the score for Icon Pictures’ Yowie series and composed music for Walt Disney Pictures’ Christopher Robin, which also featured his guitar and vocal performances. Most recently, Bryce was Song Producer, Vocalist and Performer for Netflix's Daybreak (2019 TV series).

== Filmography ==
=== Film ===
| Year | Title | Role | Notes |
|---|---|---|---|
| 2018 | Christopher Robin | Composer (additional music) | Director: Marc Forster |
| 2018 | Skyscraper | Composer (additional music) | Director: Rawson Marshall Thurber |
| 2017 | Random Tropical Paradise | Composer | Director: Sanjeev Sirpal |
| 2016 | Mechanic: Resurrection | Composer (additional music) | Director: Dennis Gansel |
| 2015 | National Lampoon: Drunk Stoned Brilliant Dead | Composer | Director: Douglas Tirola |
| 2015 | Fifty Shades of Grey | Musician (guitars) | Director: Sam Taylor-Johnson |
| 2014 | Drive Hard | Composer | Director: Brian Trenchard-Smith |
| 2013 | Rush | Composer (additional music) | Director: Ron Howard |
| 2012 | The Watermen | Composer | Director: Matt L. Lockhart |
| 2012 | Red Dawn | Composer (additional music) | Director: Dan Bradley |
| 2012 | Bad Karma | Composer | Director: Suri Krishnamma |
| 2008 | Australia | Additional Orchestrator | Director: Baz Luhrmann |
| 2008 | Jumper | Orchestrator | Director: Doug Liman |

=== Television ===
| Year | Title | Role | Notes |
|---|---|---|---|
| 2020 | Daybreak | Song Producer | |
| 2017 | Doomsday | Composer (additional music) | |
| 2017 | 12 Monkeys | Composer | |
| 2016 | Broken | Composer | |
| 2015 | Blood and Oil | Composer (Additional music) | |
| 2015 | Chicago Fire | Composer (Additional music) | |
| 2012 | Dark Prophet | Composer | |
| 2011 | Breakout Kings | Composer (additional music) | |
| 2009 | Prison Break | Assistant Composer | |

=== Video games ===
| Year | Title | Role | Notes |
|---|---|---|---|
| 2012 | Medal of Honor: Warfighter | Composer (additional music) | |
| 2011 | Call of Duty: Modern Warfare 3 | Musical Arranger | |
| 2011 | Shift 2 Unleashed | Composer (Additional music) | |
| 2010 | Medal of Honor (2010) | Composer (additional music) | |

== Internet ==
| Year | Title | Role | Notes |
|---|---|---|---|
| 2018 | Yowie Series | Composer | |
