= Evelyn O'Neill =

American film producer

- Education: Harvard University; University of California, Los Angeles.
- Occupations: Talent manager and producer
- Years active: 1990–present

Evelyn O'Neill is an American talent manager and film producer. She is best known for producing the critically acclaimed film Lady Bird, for which she was co-nominated for the Academy Award for Best Picture at the 90th Academy Awards. She is also a founding partner of Entertainment 360 (formerly Entertainment 360) and the talent manager for Julianne Moore, Chadwick Boseman, Salma Hayek, Daniel Kaluuya, Bryce Dallas Howard, and Greta Gerwig.

== Career ==
O'Neill graduated cum laude from Harvard University and enrolled in the master's program in Film History, Theory and Criticism at the University of California, Los Angeles, She started her career in the late 1980s as an assistant to Suzan Bymel, with whom she founded the agency Bymel O'Neill & Associates in 1994.

In 2002, O'Neill and Bymel, together with Eric Kranzler, David Seltzer, Guymon Casady, and Daniel Rappaport began Management 360, a talent and literary management company. In 2009, The Hollywood Reporter listed her as #90 on their 100 Most Influential Women in the Entertainment Industry list. In 2017, O'Neill produced Lady Bird, with her Management 360 client and actress turned director Greta Gerwig directing and with Scott Rudin and Eli Bush as producers. The film was nominated for awards, winning the Academy Award for Best Picture.

== Filmography ==
- 2017: Lady Bird (producer)
- 2006: Faceless (TV Movie) (executive producer)
- 2005: Trust the Man (executive producer)
- 2000: Talk to Me (TV Series) (producer - 6 episodes)
- 1998: House Rules (TV Series) (producer - 7 episodes)
