= Christopher Robin (film) =

2018 film by Marc Forster

- Theatrical release poster
- Directed by: Marc Forster
- Screenplay by: Alex Ross Perry; Tom McCarthy; Allison Schroeder
- Story by: Greg Brooker; Mark Steven Johnson
- Based on: Characters from Disney's Winnie the Pooh by: A. A. Milne; E. H. Shepard
- Produced by: Brigham Taylor; Kristin Burr
- Starring: Ewan McGregor; Hayley Atwell; Jim Cummings; Nick Mohammed; Brad Garrett
- Cinematography: Matthias Koenigswieser
- Edited by: Matt Chessé
- Music by: Geoff Zanelli; Jon Brion
- Production companies: Walt Disney Pictures; 2DUX² Productions
- Distributed by: Walt Disney Studios; Motion Pictures
- Release dates: July 30, 2018 (Burbank); August 3, 2018 (United States)
- Running time: 104 minutes
- Country: United States
- Language: English
- Budget: $65–70 million
- Box office: $197.7 million

Christopher Robin is a 2018 American live-action animated fantasy comedy drama film inspired by the children's book series Winnie-the-Pooh by A. A. Milne illustrated by E. H. Shepard, and part of the Disney franchise. The film was directed by Marc Forster from a screenplay by Alex Ross Perry, Tom McCarthy and Allison Schroeder. Ewan McGregor stars as the title character, alongside Hayley Atwell as his wife Evelyn, with the voices of Jim Cummings (reprising his roles as Winnie the Pooh and Tigger), Nick Mohammed as Piglet, and Brad Garrett as Eeyore. The story follows an adult Christopher Robin, who has lost his sense of imagination only to be reunited with his childhood friend Winnie the Pooh, whom he must escort back to the Hundred Acre Wood to find his friends.

Plans of a live-action Winnie the Pooh adaptation were announced back in April 2015, and Forster was confirmed as the director in November 2016. McGregor signed on as Christopher Robin in April 2017 and principal photography began in August of that year in the United Kingdom, lasting until November.

Christopher Robin premiered in Burbank, California on July 30, 2018, and was released in the United States on August 3, by Walt Disney Studios Motion Pictures. The film received generally positive reviews from critics, who praised its performances, musical score, and visual effects. It grossed $197.7 million worldwide, becoming the highest-grossing film in Disney's Winnie the Pooh franchise, surpassing The Tigger Movie (2000). The film received an Academy Award nomination for Best Visual Effects at the 91st Academy Awards.

== Plot ==
After his living toy friends from the Hundred Acre Wood throw him a farewell party before he departs for boarding school, Christopher Robin reassures Winnie the Pooh that he will never forget him. Nevertheless, his rough experiences at school and his father's death force his maturation, and he soon forgets his Hundred Acre Wood friends. He later marries architect Evelyn, has a daughter named Madeline, serves in the British Army during World War II, and gets a job as Director of Efficiency at Winslow Luggages in London, unintentionally neglecting his family. Christopher's superior, Giles Winslow Jr., tells him to decrease expenditures by 20%, largely by choosing which employees to lay off, and to present his plan on Monday. Christopher misses joining his family at their countryside cottage in Sussex for a summer-ending weekend.

The next morning, Pooh wakes up to find his friends are missing. Looking for them, he enters a door that Christopher normally came out of, and finds himself in London. He reunites with Christopher, who is shocked to see Pooh but takes him home, before bringing him back to Sussex on the train the following day. Passing by the cottage, they enter the Hundred Acre Wood. Pooh, attempting to return Christopher's compass, trips into Christopher's briefcase, spilling his papers. Christopher angrily reminds Pooh that he is now an adult, before they are separated in the fog. Christopher falls into a Heffalump trap, which is flooded by rainfall.

Christopher discovers Eeyore and Piglet, who lead him to the others, hiding in a log from what they believe to be a Heffalump but is the squeaking of a rusty, fallen weather vane from Owl's house. He pretends to defeat the Heffalump, proving his identity. When they reunite with Pooh, Christopher apologizes for his earlier outburst and explains his dilemma. Pooh forgives and embraces him. The next day, Christopher hurries out of the Hundred Acre Wood to make his presentation after Tigger gives him his briefcase.

After Pooh discovers that Tigger removed Christopher's paperwork when drying his briefcase, Pooh, Tigger, Piglet and Eeyore decide to travel to London to return it. Madeline, wanting to dissuade her father about sending her to boarding school, recognizes them from Christopher's drawings and joins them. Evelyn discovers a note Madeline wrote, and invites Christopher to search for their daughter just as he discovers gifts that Tigger left him. Madeline's group stows away in crates, but Tigger, Eeyore and Piglet are accidentally ejected, and encounter her parents. Pooh and Madeline arrive near the Winslow building, and reunite with Christopher and the others, but Madeline trips on some steps and loses all but one of the papers. Christopher assures Madeline that she is too important to him to be sent away.

Using the paper Madeline saved, Christopher improvises a new plan involving selling luggage at reduced prices to ordinary people to increase demand, and giving employees paid leave. Winslow Jr. dismisses the idea, but his father Giles Winslow Sr. warmly agrees to it. Christopher further humiliates Winslow Jr., who contributed nothing to the plan, instead playing golf all weekend. Christopher finally takes his family into the Hundred Acre Wood to meet his friends for a picnic.

== Cast ==
=== Live-action actors ===
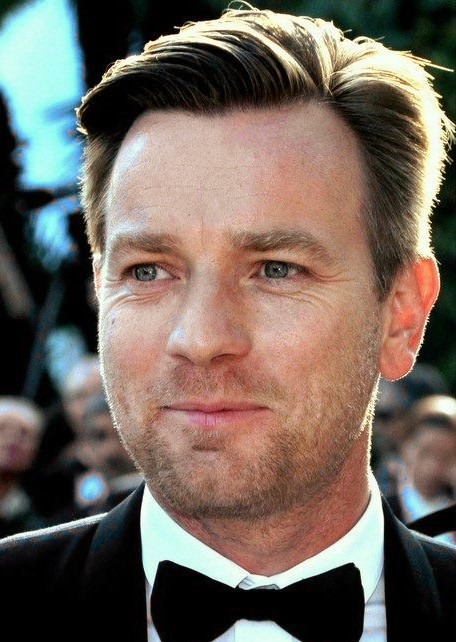
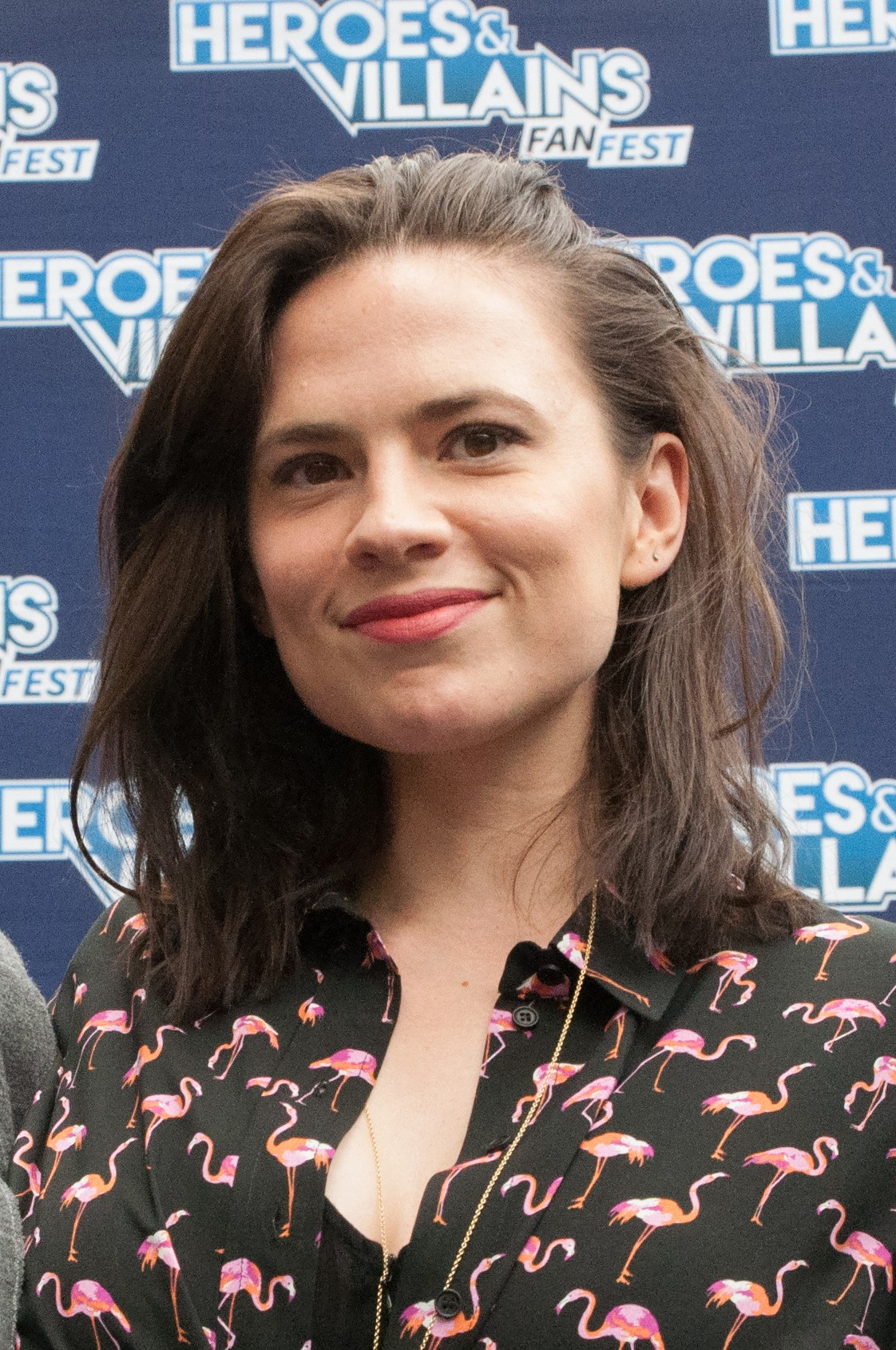
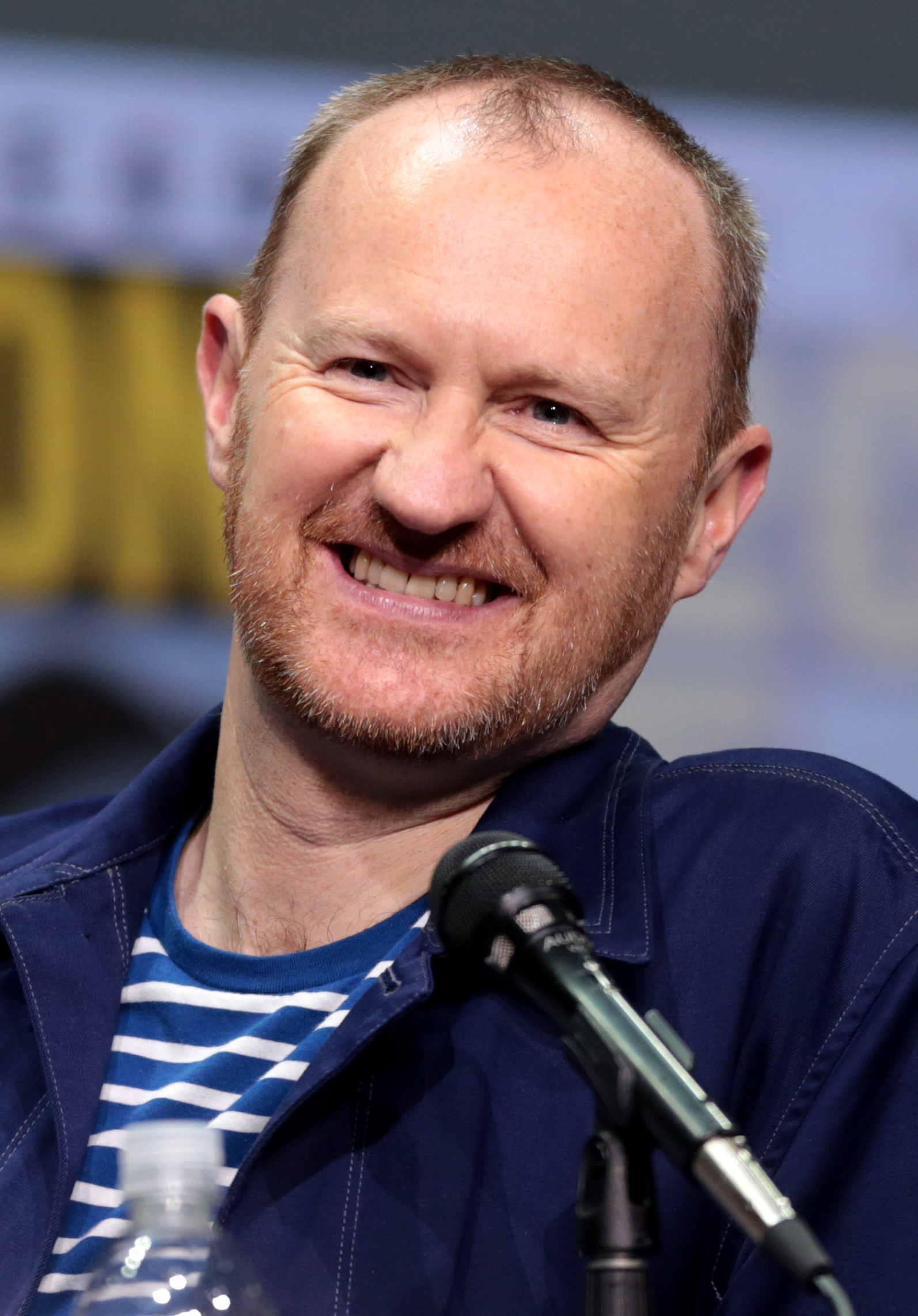
Ewan McGregor (left), Hayley Atwell and Mark Gatiss portray Christopher Robin, Evelyn Robin and Giles Winslow Junior.
- Ewan McGregor as Christopher Robin, a businessman working as an efficiency expert at Winslow Luggages who was once an imaginative boy. McGregor said that "[he] was very charmed by the script and the fact that they take Christopher Robin as a man [of his] age and that Winnie the Pooh comes back to him in a difficult time in his life. [McGregor found] it really moving", and said that "[Christopher] recognizes that he would like to be closer to [his daughter]", and said that "there was something of coming together as a father and a daughter" that appealed to him as a father of 4 daughters. McGregor said that "[the actors' performances] wouldn't be nearly as effective, wouldn't feel as real and good, if it wasn't for [the voice cast]", as he has someone he can play opposite to. McGregor stated that "[he] really [likes] playing [Christopher Robin], and [he] really [felt] like [he] wanted to play" the character. Atwell said that McGregor's performance can let people see "the Man, but underneath [the audience] see the boy that he was". Director Marc Foster said that McGregor was "the perfect Christopher Robin", as he felt he "was able to capture [the] spirit that was needed to portray Christopher Robin as an adult person".
  - Orton O'Brien as Young Christopher Robin.
- Hayley Atwell as Evelyn Robin, Christopher's wife who works as an architect. Foster said that "it was important for [him] to find" in Atwell "a very strong woman" that also is relatable and "can stand up for herself and doesn't play a victim or play into that because ultimately when [Christopher Robin denies his love to Evelyn], she's still a woman who believes in him, but also strong enough to stand up for herself". McGregor was happy when he was told that Hayley Atwell was also cast for the film, having previously worked together on Cassandra's Dream. Atwell said that the film's story is "a charming one, and a funny one, and ultimately a story about a man coming back to his family" which she felt will appeal audiences.
- Bronte Carmichael as Madeline Robin, Christopher and Evelyn's daughter
  - Elsa Minell Solak as a 3-year-old Madeline Robin.
- Mark Gatiss as Giles Winslow Jr., Christopher's boss at Winslow Luggages
- Oliver Ford Davies as Giles Winslow Sr., the father of Giles Winslow
- Ronkẹ Adékoluẹjo as Katherine Dane
- Adrian Scarborough as Hal Gallsworthy
- Roger Ashton-Griffiths as Ralph Butterworth
- Ken Nwosu as Paul Hastings
- John Dagleish as Matthew Leadbetter
- Amanda Lawrence as Joan MacMillan
- Katy Carmichael as Daphne de Sélincourt, Christopher Robin's mother
- Paul Chahidi as Cecil Hungerford
- Tristan Sturrock as A. A. Milne, Christopher Robin's father
- Matt Berry as Policeman Bobby
- Simon Farnaby as a Taxi driver
- Mackenzie Crook as a Newspaper Seller
- Clara McGregor as a Girl in Aircraft Office

=== Voice actors ===
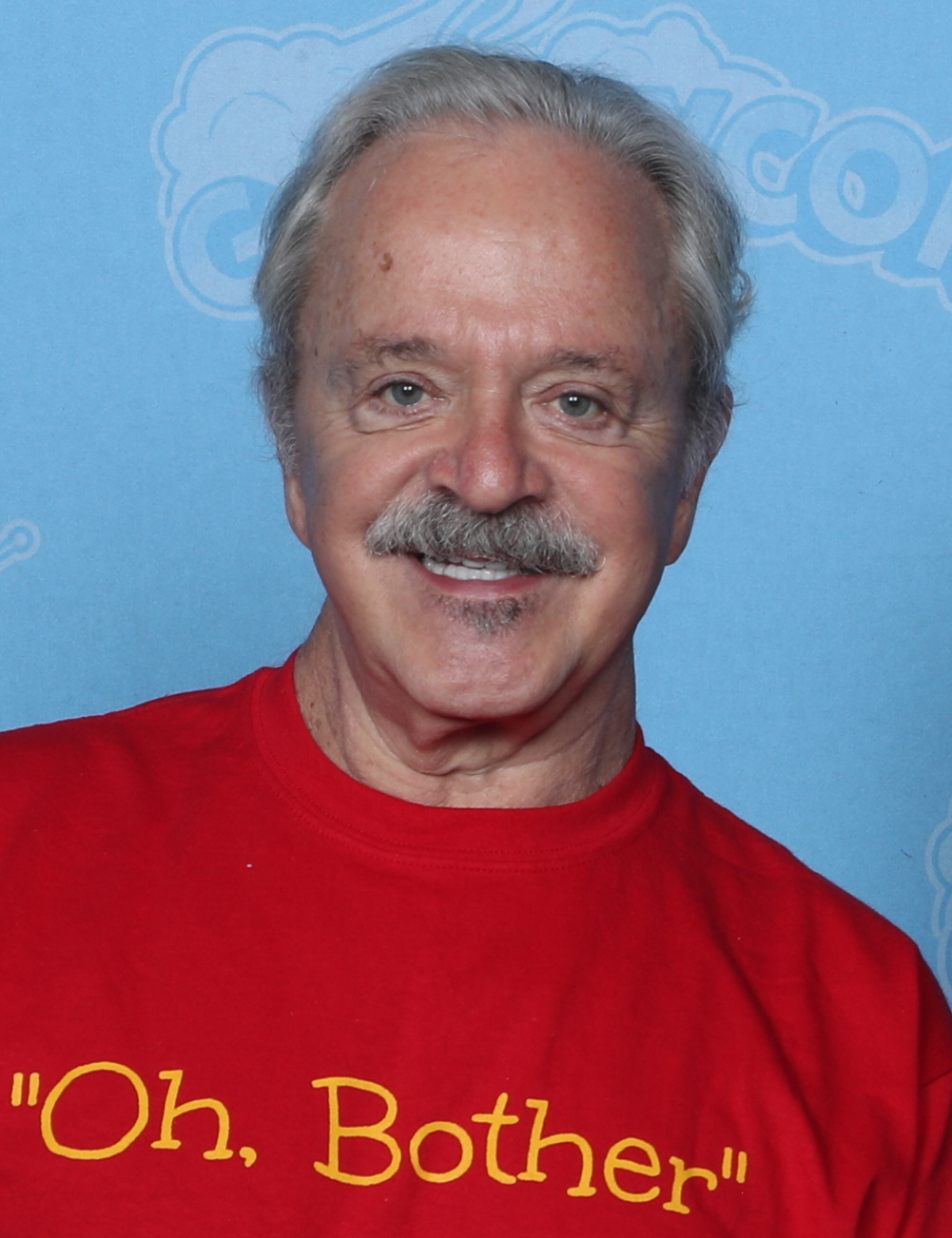
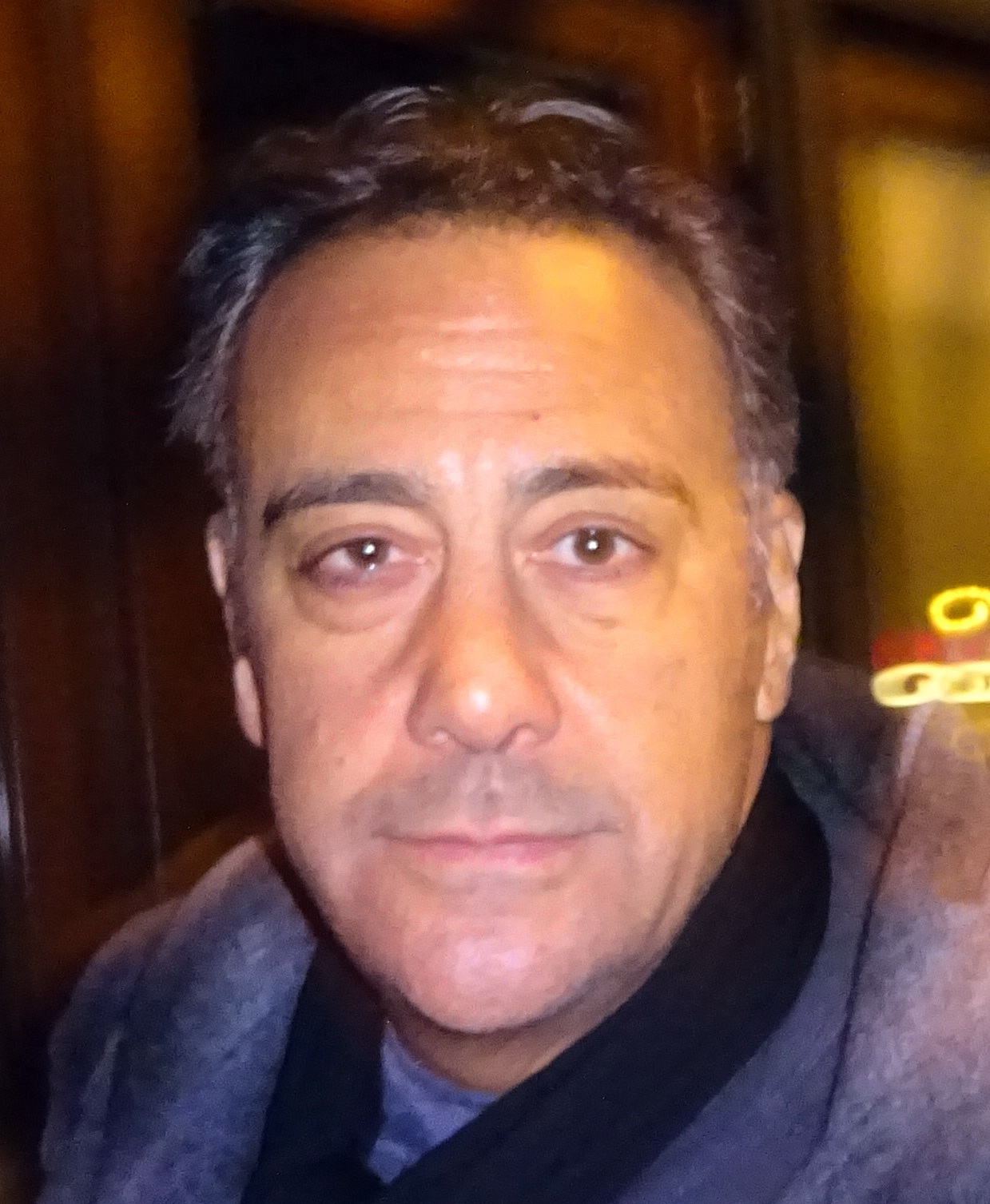
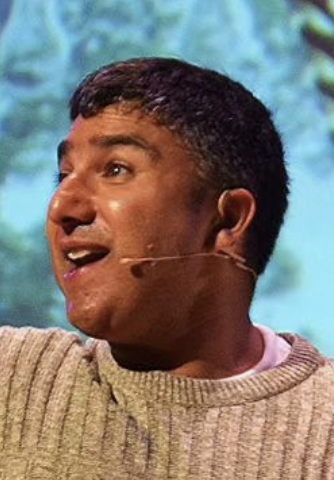
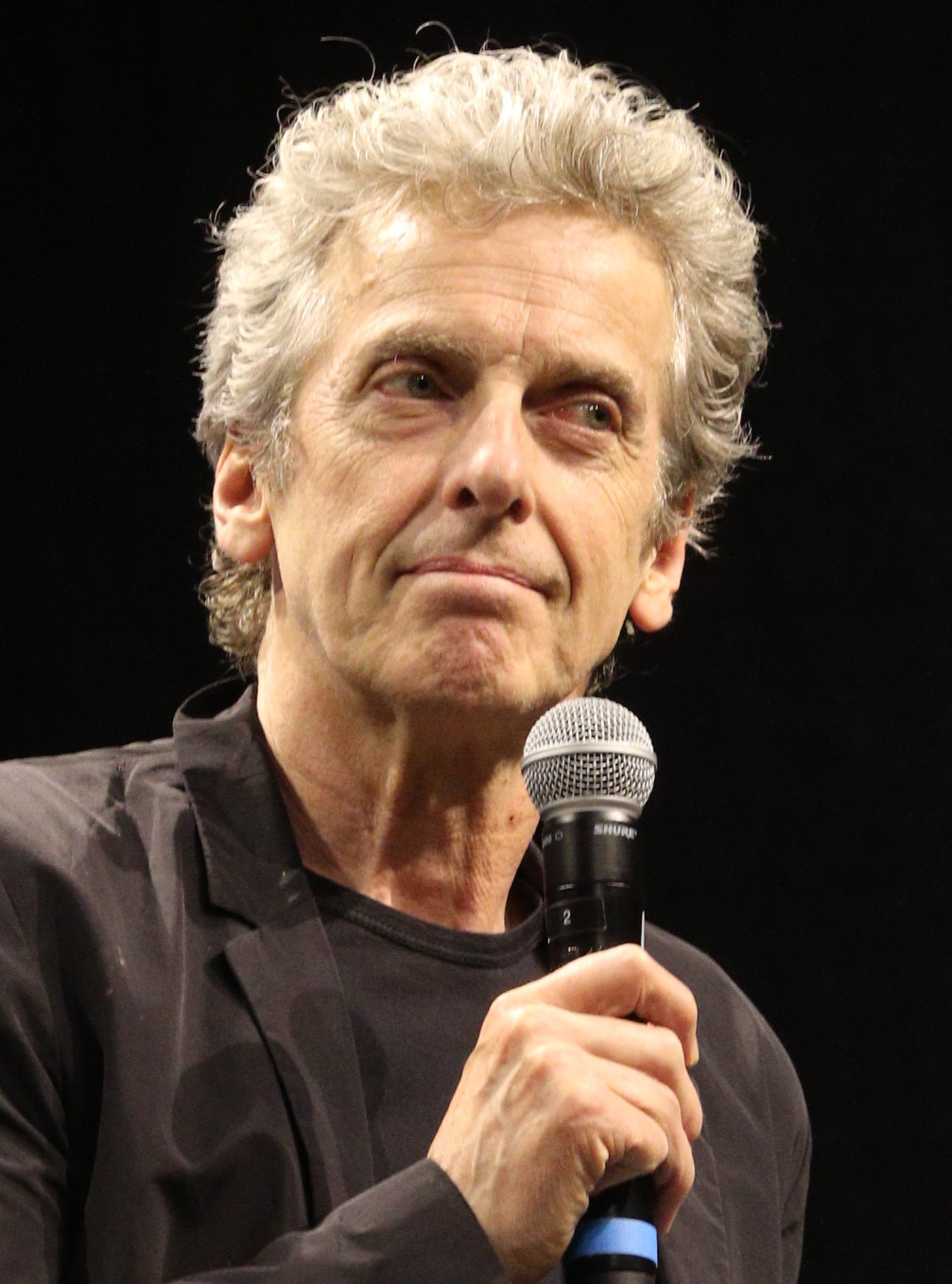
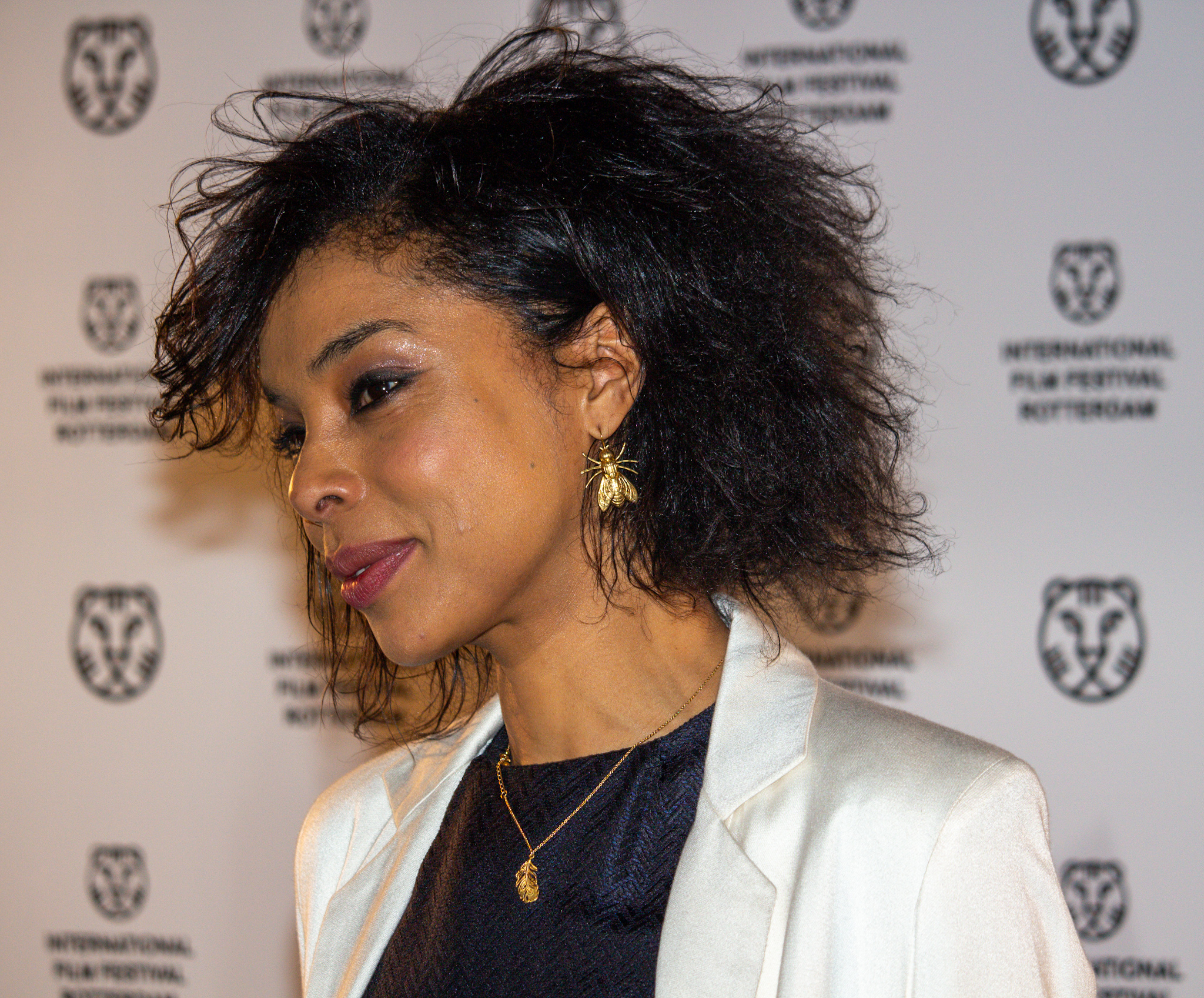
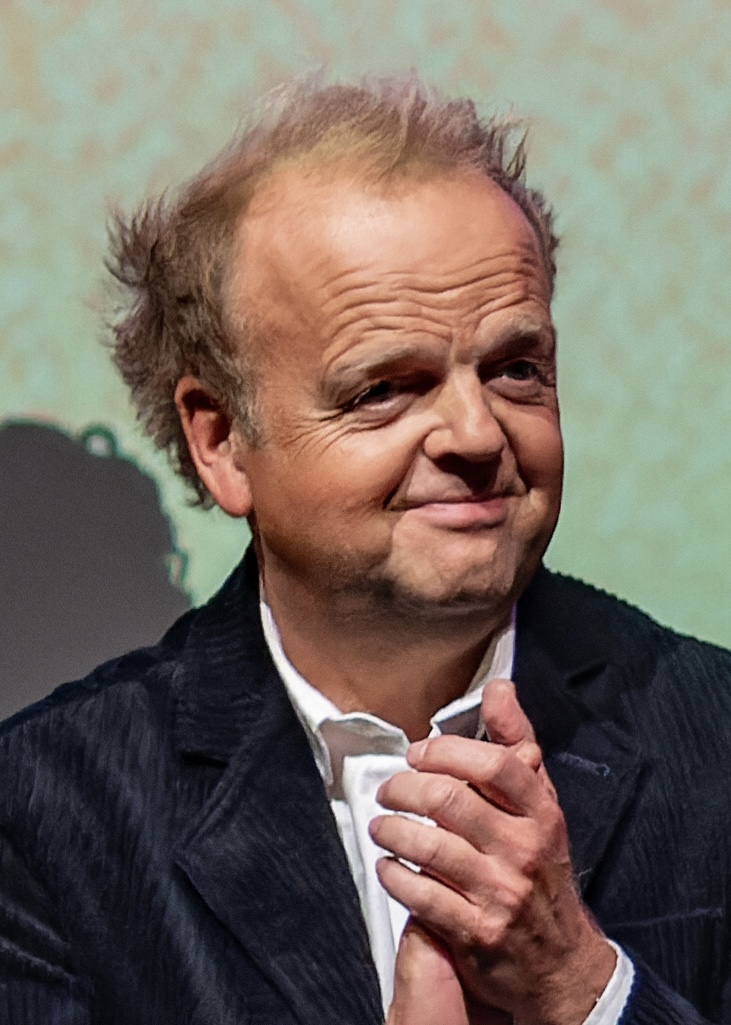
Top row: Jim Cummings, Brad Garrett and Nick Mohammed voice Winnie the Pooh, Tigger, Eeyore and Piglet
Bottom row: Peter Capaldi, Sophie Okonedo and Toby Jones voice Rabbit, Kanga and Owl.
- Jim Cummings as the voices of:
  - Winnie the Pooh, a friendly, absent-minded, honey-loving teddy bear who lives in the Hundred Acre Wood, and Christopher's closest childhood friend. Cummings has been the voice of Pooh since 1988. Atwell said that many of Pooh's lines were taken from A. A. Milne's original books, which she felt managed to capture "the wisdom of Pooh" who she said is "a bear of very little brain, but also a bear of very big heart". Kristen Burr felt that "They were so lucky to get Jim, as soon as the audience hear[s] him read his lines, a feeling of nostalgia washes over the audience and makes them smile".
  - Tigger, a free-spirited and energetic toy tiger, and one of Pooh's friends, who loves to bounce around on his tail like a spring. Cummings has been the regular voice of Tigger since 1999, and voiced the character many times as an understudy for Paul Winchell.
- Brad Garrett as Eeyore, an old pessimistic toy donkey and one of Pooh's friends with a habit of losing his tail. Garrett previously voiced the character in video games Disney's Animated Storybook: Winnie the Pooh and the Honey Tree and Ready to Read with Pooh. He later returned to voice the character in Ralph Breaks the Internet.
- Nick Mohammed as Piglet, a nervous, stuttering toy piglet and Pooh's best friend.
- Peter Capaldi as Rabbit, a short-tempered rabbit who likes to be in charge of things.
- Sophie Okonedo as Kanga, a mother toy kangaroo.
- Sara Sheen as Roo, Kanga's adventurous son.
- Toby Jones as Owl, a wise owl.

== Production ==
=== Development ===
Initially in 2003, Brigham Taylor, inspired by the last chapter of The House at Pooh Corner, pitched to Disney an idea about a Winnie the Pooh film focusing on an adult Christopher Robin. However, due to other Pooh projects being in development at the time, the project was not pitched for a film. In 2015, Kristin Burr later convinced Taylor to resurrect the project, which the two then started working on that year.

On April 2, 2015, Walt Disney Pictures announced that a live-action adaptation based on the characters from the Winnie the Pooh franchise was in development, which would take a similar pattern to Alice in Wonderland (2010), Maleficent (2014), and Cinderella (2015). Alex Ross Perry was hired to write the script and Brigham Taylor hired to produce the film, about an adult Christopher Robin returning to the Hundred Acre Wood to spend time with Pooh and the gang. On November 18, 2016, it was reported that the studio had hired Marc Forster to direct the film, titled Christopher Robin, and the project would have "strong elements of magical realism as it seeks to tell an emotional journey with heartwarming adventure." On March 1, 2017, Tom McCarthy was hired to rewrite the existing screenplay.

=== Casting ===
On April 26, 2017, Ewan McGregor was cast as the lead while Allison Schroeder was recruited to do additional work on the script. On June 22, 2017, it was revealed that Gemma Arterton had been in negotiations to portray the wife of the title character, but ultimately, she passed on the role. In August 2017, Hayley Atwell and Mark Gatiss were respectively cast as Christopher's wife Evelyn and boss Giles Winslow. Nick Mohammed was cast as Piglet, while Jim Cummings was confirmed to be reprising his role as Winnie the Pooh, and Brad Garrett was revealed to be voicing Eeyore (he previously voiced the character in the Winnie the Pooh and the Honey Tree CD-ROM game). In January 2018, Peter Capaldi, Sophie Okonedo, and Toby Jones were cast as Rabbit, Kanga, and Owl, respectively. Chris O'Dowd was originally set to voice Tigger, with Roger L. Jackson voice-doubling for him, but he was replaced by Cummings, who has played the character partially from 1989 until fully since 2000, after audiences in test screenings reacted negatively towards how O'Dowd voiced the character.

=== Filming ===
Principal photography began in early August 2017, in the United Kingdom, and wrapped on November 4, 2017. Much of the Hundred Acre Wood scenes took place at Ashdown Forest, which was the original inspiration for the setting, as well as Windsor Great Park, at Shepperton Studios and at Dover seafront and the former Dover Marine Station, now the town's cruise terminal which doubled as a London railway station. Filming also took place at Pinewood Studios. The film was shot in a mix of formats: some scenes were shot in the Panavision anamorphic format on both 35 mm film and Arri Alexa digital cameras, while other sequences were filmed on 65 mm film in both the spherical Panavision System 65 and anamorphic Ultra Panavision 70 formats. All were matted to a 2.40:1 aspect ratio for a consistent look.

=== Music ===
The original soundtrack to the film features original score composed by Jon Brion and Geoff Zanelli, with additional music written by Zak McNeil, Bryce Jacobs, Paul Mounsey, Philip Klein, and three songs—"Goodbye Farewell", "Busy Doing Nothing", and "Christopher Robin"—written by Disney Legend Richard M. Sherman. It was released on August 3, 2018 alongside the film, through Walt Disney Records.

The film is dedicated to Jóhann Jóhannsson, who was initially hired as composer, shortly before his death on February 9, 2018.

=== Visual effects ===
Studios Framestore and Method Studios, led the animation for the Hundred Acre Wood characters, with VFX Supervisor Chris Lawrence and Animation Supervisor Michael Eames leading the teams.

== Release ==
Christopher Robin opened in Burbank on July 30, 2018, and was released on August 3, 2018, by Walt Disney Studios Motion Pictures. The film was denied a release in China, as some have speculated it was due to censorship of Winnie-the-Pooh in China since mid-2017. Other industry insiders speculated it was likely due to reasons such as the film's size and the presence of other Hollywood films in the market.

=== Novelization ===
A tie-in novelization of the film written by Elizabeth Rudnick was published by Disney Publishing Worldwide on July 3, 2018.

=== Home media ===
Christopher Robin was released on DVD and Blu-ray on November 6, 2018. The film debuted in second place behind Incredibles 2 on the NPD VideoScan First Alert chart for the week ending on November 11, 2018. The film became available to stream on Netflix in the United States and Canada on March 5, 2019, before being moved to Disney+ on September 5, 2020.

== Reception ==
=== Box office ===
Christopher Robin grossed $99.2 million in the United States and Canada, and $98.4 million in other territories, for a total worldwide gross of $197.7 million.

In the United States and Canada, Christopher Robin was released alongside The Spy Who Dumped Me, The Darkest Minds, and Death of a Nation: Can We Save America a Second Time?. The film made $9.5 million on its first day, including $1.5 million from Thursday night previews. It went on to debut to $24.6 million, finishing second at the box office behind holdover Mission: Impossible – Fallout. The film fell 47% to $13 million in its second weekend, finishing third behind The Meg and Mission: Impossible – Fallout. The film finished sixth in its third through fifth weekends, grossing $8.9 million, $6.3 million, and $5.3 million, respectively.

=== Critical response ===
On the review aggregator website Rotten Tomatoes, the film has an approval rating of 73% based on 273 reviews, with an average rating of 6.2/10. The website's critical consensus reads: "Christopher Robin may not equal A. A. Milne's stories – or their animated Disney adaptations – but it should prove sweet enough for audiences seeking a little childhood magic." On Metacritic, the film has a weighted average score of 60 out of 100, based on 43 critics, indicating "mixed or average" reviews. Audiences polled by CinemaScore gave the film an average grade of "A" on an A+ to F scale, while PostTrak reported filmgoers gave it 4.5 out of 5 stars.

Ben Kenigsberg of The New York Times reviewed the film and said: "Once Christopher Robin softens its insufferable, needlessly cynical conception of the title character, it offers more or less what a Pooh reboot should: a lot of nostalgia, a bit of humor and tactile computer animation." And David Sims of The Atlantic wrote, "It's an odd, melancholic experience that at times recalls Terrence Malick as it does A. A. Milne, but there will certainly be some viewers in its exact wheelhouse."

Michael Phillips of the Chicago Tribune gave the film three out of four stars and said, "Pooh's wisdom and kindness cannot be denied. The same impulses worked for the two Paddington movies, God knows. Christopher Robin isn't quite in their league, but it's affecting nonetheless."

Richard Lawson of Vanity Fair gave the film a positive review and heavily praised the voice performance from Cummings, calling it "Oscar-worthy". Overall, he said, "As Winnie the Pooh (and Tigger too), the veteran voice actor gives such sweet, rumpled, affable life to the wistful bear of literary renown that it routinely breaks the heart. Cummings's performance understands something more keenly than the movie around it; he taps into a vein of humor and melancholy that is pitched at an exact frequency, one that will speak to child and adult alike. His Pooh is an agreeable nuisance and an accidental philosopher, delivering nonsensical (and yet entirely sensible) adages in a friendly, deliberate murmur ringed faintly with sadness. I wanted to (gently) yank him from the screen and take him home with me, his fuzzy little paw in mine as we ambled to the subway, the summer sun fading behind us. He's a good bear, this Pooh."

Conversely, Alonso Duralde of TheWrap called the film "slow and charmless" and wrote, "What we're left with is a Hook-style mid-life crisis movie aimed at kids, designed to shame parents who spend too much time at the office and not enough with their families."

Helen O'Hara of Empire magazine gave the film two out of five stars and said, "Everyone's trying hard, but they can't quite live up to the particularly gentle, warm tone of Pooh himself. Unlike the bear of very little brain, this is a film pulled in different directions with entirely too many thoughts in its head".

The performance of Ewan McGregor as Christopher Robin was particularly well received. David Fear of Rolling Stone said, "He's an actor who can roll with this movie's punches, whether it requires him to be light on his feet or dragged down by existential despair, exhilarated by childlike play or exasperated by a house-wrecking creature who says things like, 'People say nothing is impossible, but I do nothing every day'." Adam Forsgren for East Idaho News wrote, "First and foremost is McGregor's performance in the title role. The guy sells being the put-upon, overburdened office drone so well that it's a treat to see him begin to rediscover his younger self and let himself play...McGregor is the glue that holds this whole movie together." Stephanie Zacharek of Time magazine stated, "But it's doubtful the movie would work at all if not for McGregor: He turns Christopher's anxiety into a haunting presence, the kind of storm cloud that we can all, now and then, feel hovering above us. Yet McGregor is also an actor capable of expressing unalloyed delight. And when, as Christopher Robin, he finally does, some of that delight rubs off on us too."

Brian Lowry also noted in his review for CNN, "Give much of the credit to McGregor in the thankless task of playing opposite his adorably furry co-stars, ably handling the comedy derived from the fact that he doesn't dare let others see them." Odie Henderson of Rogerebert.com gave the film two out of four stars and said: "Christopher Robin can't reconcile its darkness and its light. But if these folks want to write an Eeyore movie that stays firmly planted in the Wood, I'll be first in line to see it."

Simran Hans of The Guardian gave the film a two out of five stars, and noted, "Christopher's furry friends don't appear to be figments of his imagination. If they're not a metaphor for a misplaced sense of fun (or a midlife crisis), the film's tone ends up being weirdly adult for a kids' film."

=== Accolades ===
Accolades received by Christopher Robin (film)
Award	Date of ceremony	Category	Recipient(s)	Result	Ref.
Academy Awards	February 24, 2019	Best Visual Effects	Christopher Lawrence, Mike Eames, Theo Jones, and Chris Corbould	Nominated	
Annie Awards	February 2, 2019	Outstanding Achievement for Character Animation in a Live Action Production	Arslan Elver, Laurent Laban, Kayn Garcia, Claire Blustin, and Marc-André Coulombe	Nominated	
Asian Academy Creative Awards	December 6, 2019	Best Visual or Special FX in TV Series or Feature Film	Christopher Robin	Won	
Golden Trailer Awards	May 29, 2019	Best Animation/Family	"Into The Wood" (The Propeller Group)	Nominated	
Golden Trailer Awards	May 29, 2019	Best Home Ent Family/Animation	"Announce Trailer" (Tiny Hero)	Nominated	
Humanitas Prize	February 8, 2019	Family Feature Film	Alex Ross Perry, Tom McCarthy, Allison Schroeder, Greg Brooker, and Mark Steven Johnson	Nominated	
People's Choice Awards	November 11, 2018	The Family Movie of 2018	Christopher Robin	Nominated	
San Diego Film Critics Society	December 10, 2018	Best Visual Effects	Christopher Robin	Runner-up	
Visual Effects Society Awards	February 5, 2019	Outstanding Visual Effects in a Photoreal Feature	Chris Lawrence, Steve Gaub, Michael Eames, Glenn Melenhorst, and Chris Corbould	Nominated	
Visual Effects Society Awards	February 5, 2019	Outstanding Animated Character in a Photoreal Feature	Arslan Elver, Kayn Garcia, Laurent Laban, and Mariano Mendiburu for "Tigger"	Nominated	
