= Houston Film Critics Society Awards 2017 =

Annual US film awards ceremony

11th Houston Film Critics Society Awards
- Date: January 6, 2018
- Location: Midtown Arts and Theater Complex Houston, Houston, Texas
- Presented by: Houston Film Critics Society
- Website: www.houstonfilmcritics.org

The 11th Houston Film Critics Society Awards nominations were announced on December 12, 2017. The ceremony was held on January 6, 2018.

== Winners and nominees ==
Winners are listed first and highlighted with boldface.

Best Picture	Best Foreign Language Film
**Lady Bird**; The Big Sick; Call Me by Your Name; Dunkirk; The Florida Project; Get Out; Logan; The Post; The Shape of Water; Three Billboards Outside Ebbing, Missouri	**Thelma** • Norway; BPM (Beats Per Minute) • France; Blade of the Immortal • Japan; First They Killed My Father • Cambodia; The Square • Sweden
Best Actor	Best Actress
**James Franco - The Disaster Artist**; Timothée Chalamet - Call Me by Your Name; Daniel Kaluuya - Get Out; Robert Pattinson - Good Time; Andy Serkis - War for the Planet of the Apes	**Sally Hawkins - The Shape of Water**; Frances McDormand - Three Billboards Outside Ebbing, Missouri; Brooklynn Prince - The Florida Project; Margot Robbie - I, Tonya; Saoirse Ronan - Lady Bird
Best Supporting Actor	Best Supporting Actress
**Sam Rockwell - Three Billboards Outside Ebbing, Missouri**; Willem Dafoe - The Florida Project; Richard Jenkins - The Shape of Water; Patrick Stewart - Logan; Michael Stuhlbarg - Call Me by Your Name	**Allison Janney - I, Tonya**; Holly Hunter - The Big Sick; Dafne Keen - Logan; Laurie Metcalf - Lady Bird; Octavia Spencer - The Shape of Water
Best Director	Best Cinematography
**Greta Gerwig - Lady Bird**; Guillermo del Toro - The Shape of Water; Christopher Nolan - Dunkirk; Jordan Peele - Get Out; Steven Spielberg - The Post	**Blade Runner 2049 - Roger Deakins**; Call Me by Your Name - Sayombhu Mukdeeprom; Dunkirk - Hoyte van Hoytema; The Shape of Water - Dan Laustsen; Wonder Wheel - Vittorio Storaro
Best Animated Feature Film	Best Documentary Feature
**Coco**; The Breadwinner; Despicable Me 3; The Lego Batman Movie; Loving Vincent	**Jane**; Faces Places; Kedi; Step; The Work
Best Original Score	Best Original Song
**The Shape of Water - Alexandre Desplat**; Blade Runner 2049 - Benjamin Wallfisch and Hans Zimmer; Dunkirk - Hans Zimmer; The Post - John Williams; War for the Planet of the Apes - Michael Giacchino	**"Remember Me" - Coco**; "Evermore" - Beauty and the Beast; "I Get Overwhelmed" - A Ghost Story; "Never Forget" - Murder on the Orient Express; "Visions of Gideon" - Call Me by Your Name
Best Screenplay	Best Visual Effects
**Lady Bird - Greta Gerwig**; The Big Sick - Emily V. Gordon and Kumail Nanjiani; Get Out - Jordan Peele; The Post - Elizabeth Hanna and Josh Singer; Three Billboards Outside Ebbing, Missouri - Martin McDonagh	**Blade Runner 2049**; The Shape of Water; War for the Planet of the Apes
Best Poster	Texas Independent Film Award
**The Shape of Water**; Baby Driver; It; Logan Lucky; Mother!	**A Ghost Story**; Mr. Roosevelt; Mustang Island; The Secret Life of Lance Letscher; Song to Song

== Movies with multiple nominations and awards ==
The following films received multiple nominations:

Nominations	Film
9	The Shape of Water
5	Call Me by Your Name
5	Lady Bird
4	Dunkirk
4	Get Out
4	The Post
4	Three Billboards Outside Ebbing, Missouri
3	The Big Sick
3	Blade Runner 2049
3	The Florida Project
3	Logan
3	War for the Planet of the Apes
2	A Ghost Story
2	Coco
2	I, Tonya
