= San Diego Film Critics Society Awards 2017 =

Annual US film awards ceremony

The 22nd San Diego Film Critics Society Awards were announced on December 11, 2017.

== Winners and nominees ==
=== Best Film ===
Get Out

- Call Me by Your Name
- Dunkirk
- Lady Bird
- Three Billboards Outside Ebbing, Missouri

=== Best Director ===
Greta Gerwig – Lady Bird

- Guillermo del Toro – The Shape of Water
- Martin McDonagh – Three Billboards Outside Ebbing, Missouri
- Christopher Nolan – Dunkirk
- Jordan Peele – Get Out

=== Best Male Actor ===
James McAvoy – Split

- Timothée Chalamet – Call Me by Your Name
- James Franco – The Disaster Artist
- Gary Oldman – Darkest Hour
- Robert Pattinson – Good Time

=== Best Female Actor ===
Sally Hawkins – Maudie

- Sally Hawkins – The Shape of Water
- Frances McDormand – Three Billboards Outside Ebbing, Missouri
- Margot Robbie – I, Tonya
- Saoirse Ronan – Lady Bird

=== Best Male Supporting Actor ===
Sam Rockwell – Three Billboards Outside Ebbing, Missouri

- Willem Dafoe – The Florida Project
- Woody Harrelson – Three Billboards Outside Ebbing, Missouri
- Ethan Hawke – Maudie
- Oscar Isaac – Suburbicon

=== Best Female Supporting Actor ===
Allison Janney – I, Tonya (TIE)
Laurie Metcalf – Lady Bird (TIE)

- Holly Hunter – The Big Sick
- Catherine Keener – Get Out
- Bria Vinaite – The Florida Project

=== Best Comedic Performance ===
Daniel Craig – Logan Lucky

- James Franco – The Disaster Artist
- Lil Rel Howery – Get Out
- Ezra Miller – Justice League
- Ray Romano – The Big Sick

=== Best Original Screenplay ===
Jordan Peele – Get Out

- Emily V. Gordon and Kumail Nanjiani – The Big Sick
- Greta Gerwig – Lady Bird
- Martin McDonagh – Three Billboards Outside Ebbing, Missouri
- Christopher Nolan – Dunkirk

=== Best Adapted Screenplay ===
Scott Neustadter and Michael H. Weber – The Disaster Artist

- Sofia Coppola – The Beguiled
- James Gray – The Lost City of Z
- James Ivory – Call Me by Your Name
- Virgil Williams and Dee Rees – Mudbound

=== Best Animated Film ===
My Life as a Zucchini

- The Boss Baby
- Coco
- Loving Vincent
- My Entire High School Sinking Into the Sea

=== Best Documentary ===
Jane

- Ex Libris: The New York Public Library
- Faces Places
- Last Men in Aleppo
- The Work

=== Best Foreign Language Film ===
Thelma

- BPM (Beats per Minute)
- Faces Places
- The Other Side of Hope
- The Square

=== Best Cinematography ===
Hoyte van Hoytema – Dunkirk

- Roger Deakins – Blade Runner 2049
- Darius Khondji – The Lost City of Z
- Dan Laustsen – The Shape of Water
- Ben Richardson – Wind River

=== Best Costume Design ===
Mark Bridges – Phantom Thread (TIE)
Jacqueline Durran – Beauty and the Beast (TIE)

- Stacey Battat – The Beguiled
- Jenny Eagan – Hostiles
- Sonia Grande – The Lost City of Z
- Luis Sequeira – The Shape of Water

=== Best Editing ===
Paul Machliss and Jonathan Amos – Baby Driver

- Michael Kahn and Sarah Broshar – The Post
- Jon Gregory – Three Billboards Outside Ebbing, Missouri
- Lee Smith – Dunkirk
- Sidney Wolinsky – The Shape of Water

=== Best Production Design ===
Paul D. Austerberry – The Shape of Water

- Nathan Crowley – Dunkirk
- Sarah Greenwood – Beauty and the Beast
- Alessandra Querzola and Dennis Gassner – Blade Runner 2049
- Anne Ross – The Beguiled

=== Best Visual Effects ===
War for the Planet of the Apes

- Beauty and the Beast
- Blade Runner 2049
- Dunkirk
- The Shape of Water

=== Best Use of Music in a Film ===
Baby Driver

- Beauty and the Beast
- Call Me by Your Name
- Dunkirk
- The Shape of Water

=== Breakthrough Artist ===
Timothée Chalamet

- Greta Gerwig
- Barry Keoghan
- Sophia Lillis
- Jordan Peele
- Brooklynn Prince

=== Best Ensemble ===
Mudbound

- Get Out
- Lady Bird
- The Post
- Three Billboards Outside Ebbing, Missouri

=== Best Body of Work ===
Michael Stuhlbarg for Call Me by Your Name, The Post, and The Shape of Water
