= Washington D.C. Area Film Critics Association Award for Best Original Screenplay =

Award given by the Washington D.C. Area Film Critics Association

The Washington D.C. Area Film Critics Association Award for Best Original Screenplay is one of the annual awards given by the Washington D.C. Area Film Critics Association.

== Winners and nominees ==
=== 2000s ===
Year	Writer(s)	Film
2002	Nia Vardalos	My Big Fat Greek Wedding
2003	Sofia Coppola	Lost in Translation
2003	Bob Peterson, David Reynolds, and Andrew Stanton	Finding Nemo
2003	Guillermo Arriaga	21 Grams
2003	Steven Knight	Dirty Pretty Things
2003	Catherine Hardwicke and Nikki Reed	Thirteen
2004	Alexander Payne and Jim Taylor	Sideways
2005	Paul Haggis and Bobby Moresco	Crash
2005	George Clooney and Grant Heslov	Good Night, and Good Luck.
2005	Craig Brewer	Hustle & Flow
2005	Angus MacLachlan	Junebug
2005	Noah Baumbach	The Squid and the Whale
2006	Michael Arndt	Little Miss Sunshine
2007	Diablo Cody	Juno
2008	Jenny Lumet	Rachel Getting Married
2009	Quentin Tarantino	Inglourious Basterds
2009	Scott Neustadter and Michael H. Weber	(500) Days of Summer
2009	Mark Boal	The Hurt Locker
2009	Joel Coen and Ethan Coen	A Serious Man
2009	Bob Peterson and Pete Docter	Up

=== 2010s ===
Year	Writer(s)	Film
2010	Christopher Nolan	Inception
2010	Mike Leigh	Another Year
2010	Mark Heyman, Andres Heinz, and John McLaughlin	Black Swan
2010	Lisa Cholodenko and Stuart Blumberg	The Kids Are All Right
2010	David Seidler	The King's Speech
2011	Will Reiser	50/50
2011	Michel Hazanavicius	The Artist
2011	Annie Mumolo and Kristen Wiig	Bridesmaids
2011	Woody Allen	Midnight in Paris
2011	Thomas McCarthy	Win Win
2012	Rian Johnson	Looper
2012	Quentin Tarantino	Django Unchained
2012	Paul Thomas Anderson	The Master
2012	Wes Anderson and Roman Coppola	Moonrise Kingdom
2012	Mark Boal	Zero Dark Thirty
2013	Spike Jonze	Her
2013	Eric Warren Singer and David O. Russell	American Hustle
2013	Woody Allen	Blue Jasmine
2013	Nicole Holofcener	Enough Said
2013	Joel Coen and Ethan Coen	Inside Llewyn Davis
2014	Alejandro G. Iñárritu, Nicolás Giacobone, Alexander Dinelaris, Jr., and Armando Bo	Birdman or (The Unexpected Virtue of Ignorance)
2014	Richard Linklater	Boyhood
2014	Wes Anderson	The Grand Budapest Hotel
2014	Phil Lord and Christopher Miller	The Lego Movie
2014	Damien Chazelle	Whiplash
2015	Pete Docter, Meg LeFauve, Josh Cooley, and Ronnie del Carmen	Inside Out
2015	Matt Charman, Joel Coen, and Ethan Coen	Bridge of Spies
2015	Alex Garland	Ex Machina
2015	Tom McCarthy and Josh Singer	Spotlight
2015	Amy Schumer	Trainwreck
2016	Damien Chazelle	La La Land
2016	Taylor Sheridan	Hell or High Water
2016	Yorgos Lanthimos and Efthimis Filippou	The Lobster
2016	Kenneth Lonergan	Manchester by the Sea
2016	Barry Jenkins and Tarell Alvin McCraney	Moonlight
2017	Jordan Peele	Get Out
2017	Emily V. Gordon and Kumail Nanjiani	The Big Sick
2017	Greta Gerwig	Lady Bird
2017	Guillermo del Toro and Vanessa Taylor	The Shape of Water
2017	Martin McDonagh	Three Billboards Outside Ebbing, Missouri
2018	Deborah Davis and Tony McNamara	The Favourite
2018	Bo Burnham	Eighth Grade
2018	Paul Schrader	First Reformed
2018	Brian Hayes Currie, Peter Farrelly, and Nick Vallelonga	Green Book
2018	Alfonso Cuaron	Roma
2019	Noah Baumbach	Marriage Story
2019	Rian Johnson	Knives Out
2019	Quentin Tarantino	Once Upon a Time...in Hollywood
2019	Bong Joon-ho and Han Jin-won	Parasite
2019	Jordan Peele	Us

=== 2020s ===
Year	Writer(s)	Film
2020	Emerald Fennell	Promising Young Woman
2020	Lee Isaac Chung	Minari
2020	Abraham Marder and Darius Marder	Sound of Metal
2020	Andy Siara	Palm Springs
2020	Aaron Sorkin	The Trial of the Chicago 7
2021	Kenneth Branagh	Belfast
2021	Mike Mills	C'mon C'mon
2021	Zach Baylin	King Richard
2021	Paul Thomas Anderson	Licorice Pizza
2021	Fran Kranz	Mass
2022	Daniel Kwan and Daniel Scheinert	Everything Everywhere All At Once
2022	Martin McDonagh	The Banshees of Inisherin
2022	Steven Spielberg and Tony Kushner	The Fabelmans
2022	Jordan Peele	Nope
2022	Todd Field	Tár
2023	Celine Song	Past Lives
2023	Alex Convery	Air
2023	Justine Triet and Arthur Harari	Anatomy of a Fall
2023	Greta Gerwig and Noah Baumbach	Barbie
2023	David Hemingson	The Holdovers
2023	Samy Burch and Alex Mechanik	May December
2024	Jesse Eisenberg	A Real Pain
2024	Sean Baker	Anora
2024	Brady Corbet and Mona Fastvold	The Brutalist
2024	Justin Kuritzkes	Challengers
2024	Coralie Fargeat	The Substance
