= Emily V. Gordon =

American writer, producer and podcast host (born 1979)

Emily Gordon
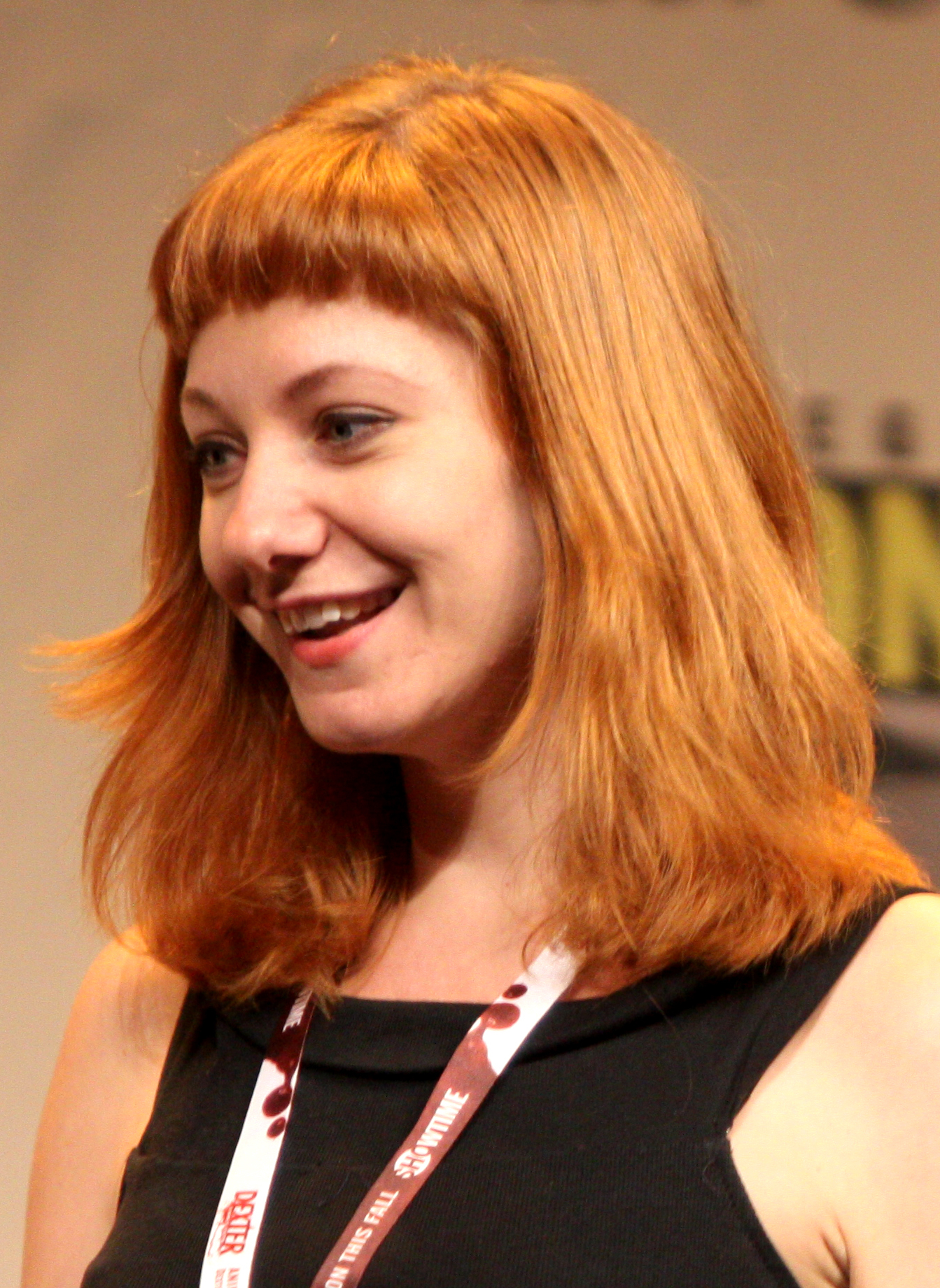
- Gordon in 2012
- Born: May 3, 1979 (age 47); Winston-Salem, North Carolina, U.S.
- Education: East Carolina University (BA); University of North Carolina, Greensboro (MS, EdS)
- Occupations: Writer, producer
- Spouse: Kumail Nanjiani (m. 2007)

Emily V. Gordon (born May 3, 1979) is an American writer, producer, and podcast host. She co-wrote the 2017 romantic comedy film The Big Sick, based on her relationship with her husband and frequent collaborator, comic Kumail Nanjiani. Gordon and Nanjiani won the Independent Spirit Award for Best First Screenplay for The Big Sick; they were also nominated for the Academy Award for Best Original Screenplay, among many other nominations.

Gordon began her career as a family and couples therapist before becoming a writer and comedy producer. She co-created the live show The Meltdown with Jonah and Kumail and its television counterpart for Comedy Central, and has written for television (The Carmichael Show), a book (Super You), and for several online and print publications.

== Early life ==
Gordon was born and raised in Winston-Salem, North Carolina. She received a BA in psychology from East Carolina University and an MS/EdS in couples and family counseling from the University of North Carolina at Greensboro.

== Career ==
=== Counseling career ===
Gordon was a practicing therapist from 2004 to 2009, working in North Carolina, Chicago, Illinois (where she moved in 2005), and Brooklyn, New York (where she moved in 2007).

=== Writing and comedy ===
Gordon began her comedy career in New York, where she worked at Comix comedy club and produced a live show with Pete Holmes. By the time she moved to Los Angeles in 2010, Gordon was pursuing comedy and freelance writing full-time.

Gordon has written two webseries aimed at teenagers, called Power Up and ExploreD, at Disney.com. She wrote for the second season of The Carmichael Show on NBC, writing an episode called "New Neighbors". In addition to writing, Gordon also produces comedy. In 2010, she created a weekly live show co-hosted by Jonah Ray and Kumail Nanjiani called The Meltdown with Jonah and Kumail, located in the back of comic bookstore Meltdown Comics; Gordon served as producer and booker. In 2011, she was asked by Chris Hardwick, who wanted to turn the space into a curated comedy venue, to act as program director. She served as program director of the Nerdist Showroom at Meltdown Comics from 2011 to 2012. In 2013, Comedy Central ordered a pilot for The Meltdown with Jonah and Kumail, which was made a series in 2014; Gordon was an executive producer.

From 2011 to 2015, Gordon and Nanjiani co-hosted a Nerdist network podcast called The Indoor Kids, which "isn't just about video games, but it isn't not about video games." In 2020, Gordon and Nanjiani co-hosted a podcast called Staying In with Emily and Kumail, about the quarantine due to COVID-19.

Gordon was signed to adapt Cynthia D’Aprix Sweeney's 2016 novel The Nest for Amazon's film studio. Joey Soloway and Andrea Sperling will produce the feature film.

=== Super You ===
Gordon's first book, Super You: Release Your Inner Superhero, a tongue-in-cheek self-improvement guide, was released in 2015.

=== The Big Sick ===
Gordon co-wrote the screenplay of and co-executive produced the 2017 film The Big Sick, with her husband Kumail Nanjiani. The critically acclaimed film is based on the beginning of their relationship, with Nanjiani playing himself, and Gordon (renamed Emily Gardner) played by Zoe Kazan. The Big Sick was directed by Michael Showalter and produced by Judd Apatow.

Gordon and Nanjiani's script won the Independent Spirit Award for Best First Screenplay. It was also nominated for a 2018 Academy Award for Best Original Screenplay, as well as screenwriting awards from the Writers Guild of America, the Gotham Awards, and a dozen critics' associations.

== Personal life ==
Gordon has been married to actor and comedian Kumail Nanjiani since 2007. It is her second marriage. She met Nanjiani at a comedy show in Chicago where he was performing and she lightly heckled him, an encounter depicted in The Big Sick. In the ensuing months, they began dating but Gordon fell seriously ill and was put into a medically induced coma before being diagnosed with Still's disease. She recovered three months later, and a year after first meeting, they married. Before moving to Los Angeles, they lived in Chicago and New York.

== Filmography ==
Selected credits

Year	Title	Credited as		Notes
Year	Title	Writer	Executive producer	Notes
2014–16	The Meltdown with Jonah and Kumail	Yes	Yes	Co-creator; 24 episodes
2017	The Big Sick	Yes	Yes	Film
2015–19	Crashing	Yes	No	Staff writer; season 2 (8 episodes)
2020–22	Little America	Yes	Yes	Co-creator; 16 episodes
2022	Welcome to Chippendales	No	Yes	6 episodes
2026	Taskmaster	No	No	Series 21, 2 episodes, voice only

== Awards and nominations ==
Date of ceremony	Award	Category	Nominated work	Result (Note: All awards and nominations Shared with Kumail Nanjiani.)	Ref.
March 4, 2018	Academy Awards	Best Original Screenplay	The Big Sick	Nominated	
January 8, 2018	Austin Film Critics Association	Best Original Screenplay	The Big Sick	Nominated	
December 12, 2017	Chicago Film Critics Association	Best Original Screenplay	The Big Sick	Nominated	
January 11, 2018	Critics' Choice Movie Awards	Best Original Screenplay	The Big Sick	Nominated	
December 7, 2017	Detroit Film Critics Society	Best Screenplay	The Big Sick	Nominated	
December 23, 2017	Florida Film Critics Circle	Best Original Screenplay	The Big Sick	Nominated	
January 12, 2018	Georgia Film Critics Association	Best Original Screenplay	The Big Sick	Nominated	
November 27, 2017	Gotham Awards	Best Screenplay	The Big Sick	Nominated	
January 6, 2018	Houston Film Critics Society	Best Screenplay	The Big Sick	Nominated	
March 3, 2018	Independent Spirit Awards	Best First Screenplay	The Big Sick	Won	
December 11, 2017	San Diego Film Critics Society	Best Original Screenplay	The Big Sick	Nominated	
December 10, 2017	San Francisco Film Critics Circle	Best Original Screenplay	The Big Sick	Nominated	
December 18, 2017	Seattle Film Critics Society	Best Screenplay	The Big Sick	Nominated	
December 17, 2017	St. Louis Film Critics Association	Best Original Screenplay	The Big Sick	Nominated	
December 8, 2017	Washington D.C. Area Film Critics Association	Best Original Screenplay	The Big Sick	Nominated	
February 11, 2018	Writers Guild of America	Best Original Screenplay	The Big Sick	Nominated	
