= Dallas–Fort Worth Film Critics Association Awards 2017 =

Awards show for film held in Dallas, TX in 2017

23rd Dallas–Fort Worth Film Critics Association Awards
- Date: December 13, 2017
- Location: Dallas, Texas
- Country: United States
- Presented by: Dallas–Fort Worth Film Critics Association
- Website: dfwcritics.com

The 23rd Dallas–Fort Worth Film Critics Association Awards honoring the best in film for 2017 were announced on December 13, 2017. These awards "recognizing extraordinary accomplishment in film" are presented annually by the Dallas–Fort Worth Film Critics Association (DFWFCA), based in the Dallas–Fort Worth metroplex region of Texas. The organization, founded in 1990, includes 30 film critics for print, radio, television, and internet publications based in north Texas. The Dallas–Fort Worth Film Critics Association began presenting its annual awards list in 1993.

The Shape of Water was the DFWFCA's most awarded film of 2017, taking five top honors: Best Picture, Best Director (Guillermo del Toro), Best Actress (Sally Hawkins), Best Cinematography, and Best Musical Score.

== Winners ==
Winners are listed first and highlighted with boldface. Other films ranked by the annual poll are listed in order. While most categories saw 5 honorees named, categories ranged from as many as 10 (Best Film) to as few as 2 (Best Animated Film, Best Cinematography, Best Screenplay, and Best Musical Score).

=== Category awards ===
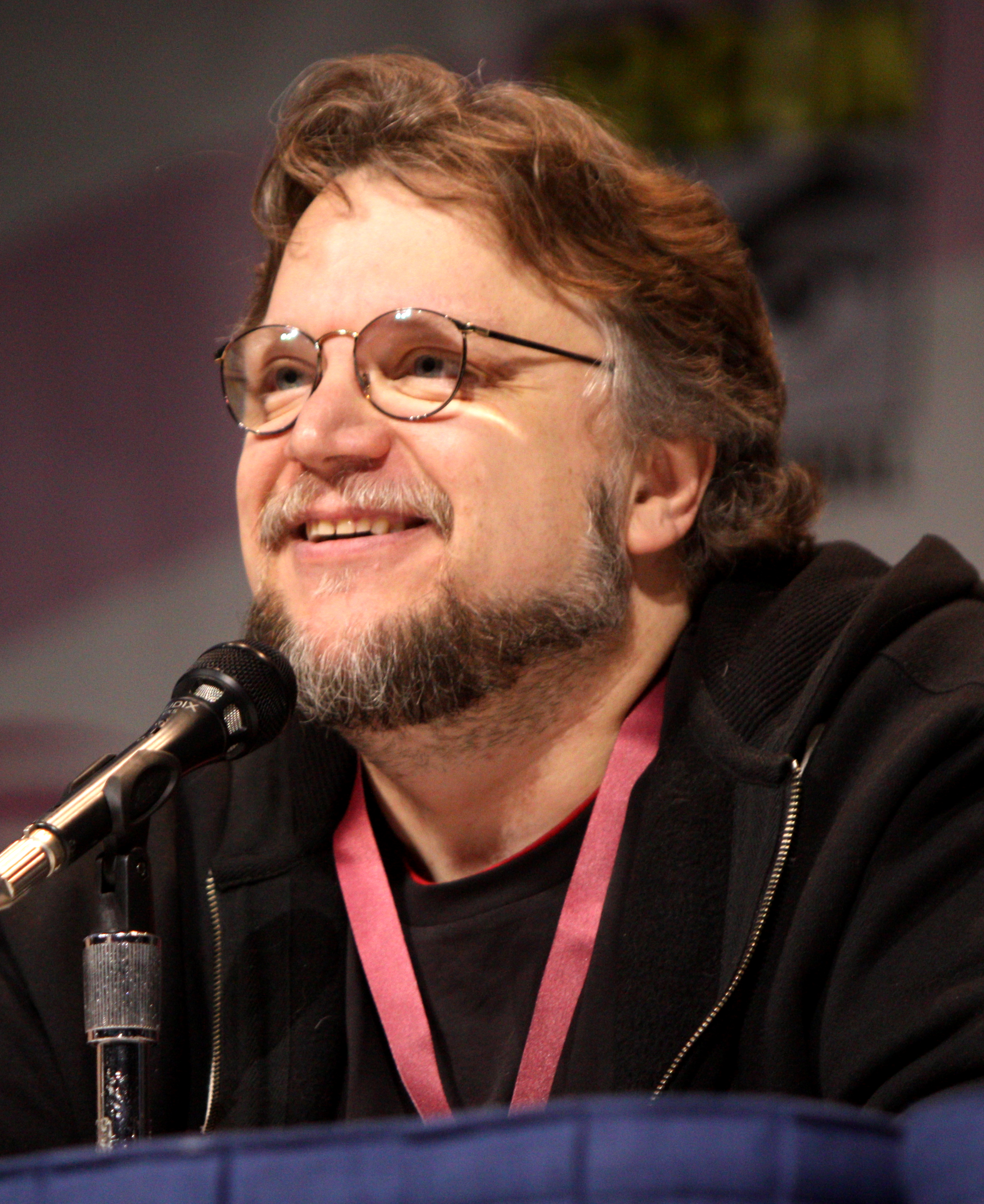
Guillermo del Toro, Best Director winner

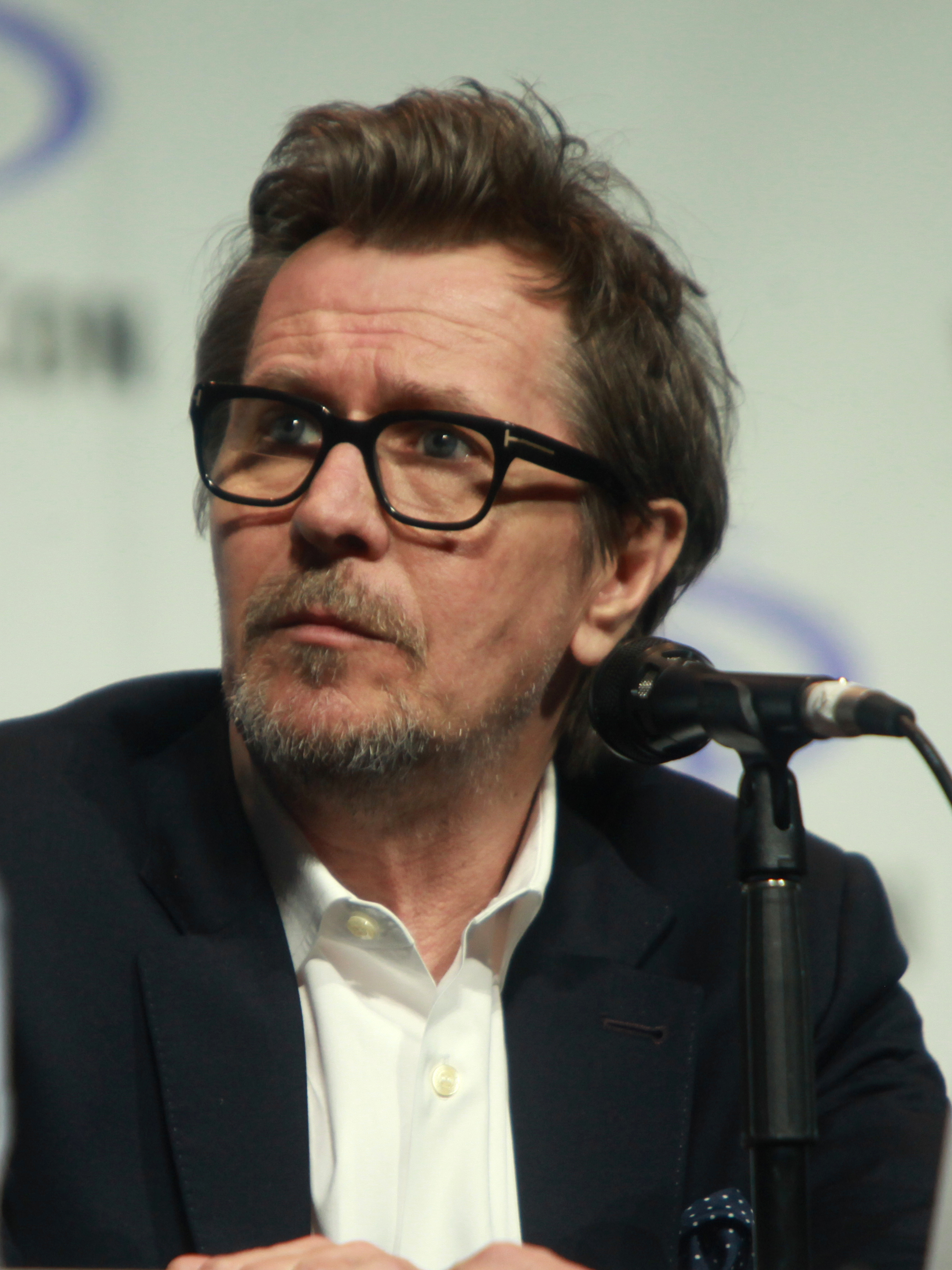
Gary Oldman, Best Actor winner

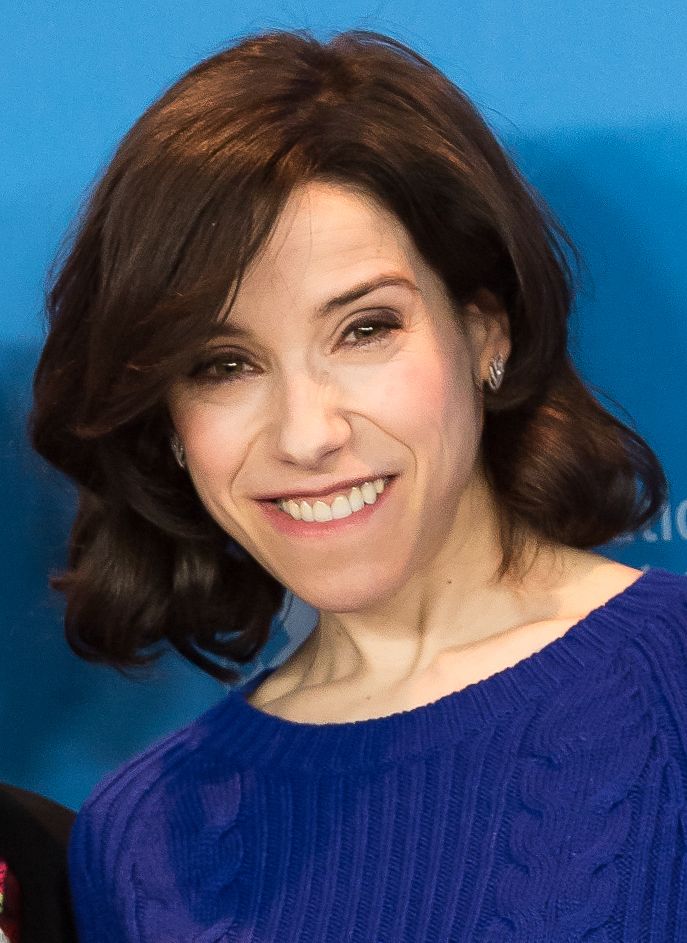
Sally Hawkins, Best Actress winner

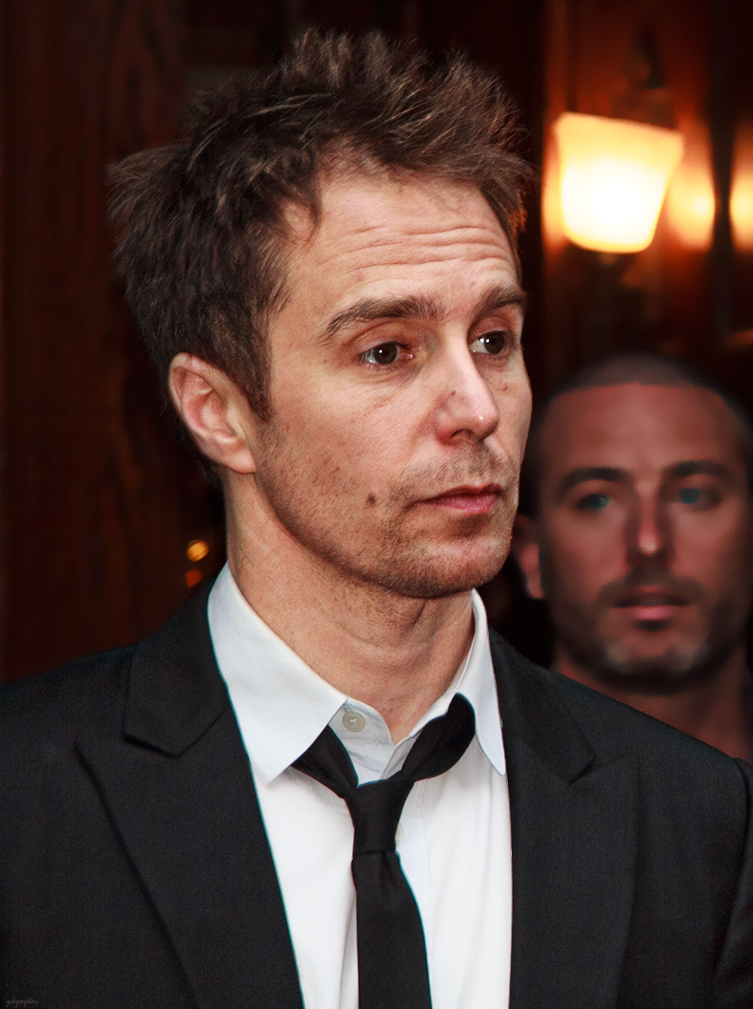
Sam Rockwell, Best Supporting Actor winner

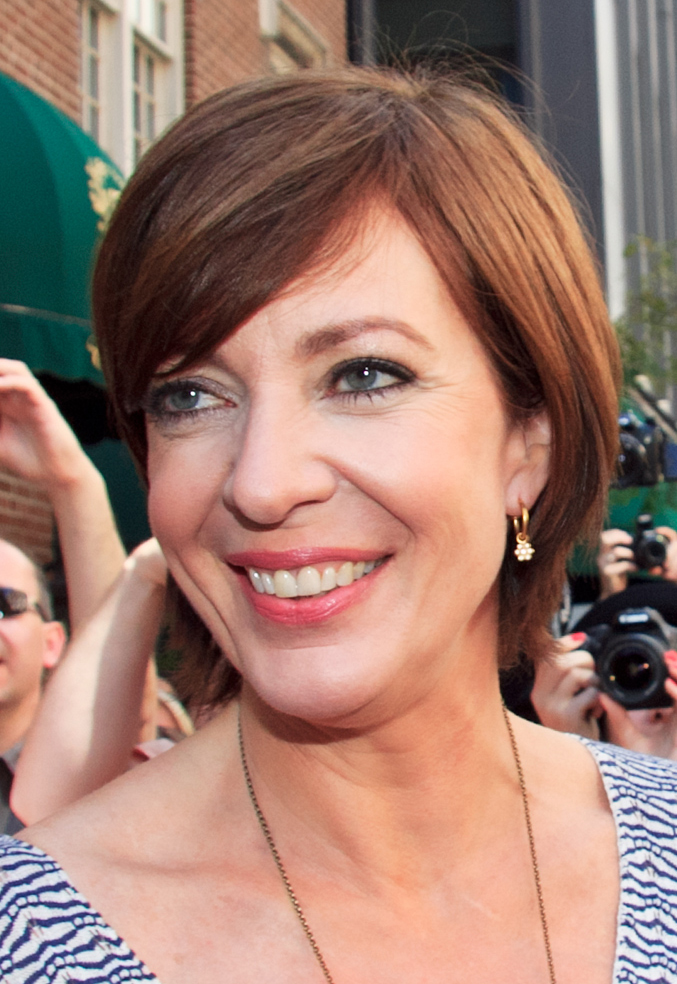
Allison Janney, Best Supporting Actress winner

Best Picture	Best Foreign Language Film
1. **The Shape of Water**; 2. The Post; 3. Lady Bird; 4. Call Me by Your Name; 5. Get Out; 6. Dunkirk; 7. Three Billboards Outside Ebbing, Missouri; 8. I, Tonya; 9. The Florida Project; 10. Darkest Hour	1. **The Square** • Sweden; 2. Thelma • Norway; 3. BPM (Beats per Minute) • France; 4. First They Killed My Father • Cambodia; 5. In the Fade • Germany
Best Actor	Best Actress
1. **Gary Oldman** – Darkest Hour as Winston Churchill; 2. James Franco – The Disaster Artist as Tommy Wiseau; 3. Daniel Day-Lewis – Phantom Thread as Reynolds Woodcock; 4. Timothée Chalamet – Call Me by Your Name as Elio Perlman; 5. Tom Hanks – The Post as Ben Bradlee	1. **Sally Hawkins** – The Shape of Water as Elisa Esposito; 2. Frances McDormand – Three Billboards Outside Ebbing, Missouri as Mildred Hayes; 3. Margot Robbie – I, Tonya as Tonya Harding; 4. Saoirse Ronan – Lady Bird as Christine "Lady Bird" McPherson; 5. Meryl Streep – The Post as Katharine Graham
Best Supporting Actor	Best Supporting Actress
1. **Sam Rockwell** – Three Billboards Outside Ebbing, Missouri as Officer Jason Dixon; 2. Willem Dafoe – The Florida Project as Bobby Hicks; 3. Richard Jenkins – The Shape of Water as Giles; 4. Armie Hammer – Call Me by Your Name as Oliver; 5. Woody Harrelson – Three Billboards Outside Ebbing, Missouri as Sheriff Bill Willoughby	1. **Allison Janney** – I, Tonya as LaVona Golden; 2. Laurie Metcalf – Lady Bird as Marion McPherson; 3. Mary J. Blige – Mudbound as Florence Jackson; 4. Holly Hunter – The Big Sick as Beth Gardner; 5. Octavia Spencer – The Shape of Water as Zelda Fuller
Best Director	Best Documentary Film
1. **Guillermo del Toro** – The Shape of Water; 2. Greta Gerwig – Lady Bird; 3. Christopher Nolan – Dunkirk; 4. Steven Spielberg – The Post; 5. Jordan Peele – Get Out	1. **City of Ghosts**; 2. Jane; 3. An Inconvenient Sequel: Truth to Power; 4. Ex Libris: The New York Public Library; 5. Last Men in Aleppo
Best Animated Film	Best Cinematography
1. **Coco**; 2. Loving Vincent	1. **Dan Laustsen** – The Shape of Water; 2. Roger Deakins – Blade Runner 2049
Best Screenplay	Best Musical Score
1. **Greta Gerwig** – Lady Bird; 2. Guillermo del Toro and Vanessa Taylor – The Shape of Water	1. **Alexandre Desplat** – The Shape of Water; 2. Hans Zimmer – Dunkirk

=== Individual awards ===
==== Russell Smith Award ====
- The Florida Project, for "best low-budget or cutting-edge independent film"
