= Houston Film Critics Society Award for Best Screenplay =

Annual US film award

The Houston Film Critics Society Award for Best Screenplay is an annual award given by the Houston Film Critics Society.

== Winners ==
=== 2000s ===
Year	Winner	Writer(s)
2007	Juno	Diablo Cody
2007	Atonement	Christopher Hampton
2007	Michael Clayton	Tony Gilroy
2007	No Country for Old Men	Joel Coen and Ethan Coen
2007	The Savages	Tamara Jenkins
2008	Slumdog Millionaire	Simon Beaufoy
2008	The Curious Case of Benjamin Button	Eric Roth
2008	The Dark Knight	Christopher Nolan and Jonathan Nolan
2008	Doubt	John Patrick Shanley
2008	Milk	Dustin Lance Black
2009	Up in the Air	Jason Reitman and Sheldon Turner
2009	The Hurt Locker	Mark Boal
2009	Inglourious Basterds	Quentin Tarantino
2009	In the Loop	Jesse Armstrong, Simon Blackwell, Armando Iannucci, and Tony Roche
2009	Precious: Based on the Novel "Push" by Sapphire	Geoffrey S. Fletcher

=== 2010s ===
Year	Winner	Writer(s)
2010	The Social Network	Aaron Sorkin
2010	Inception	Christopher Nolan
2010	The Kids Are All Right	Lisa Cholodenko and Stuart Blumberg
2010	Toy Story 3	John Lasseter, Andrew Stanton, Lee Unkrich, and Michael Arndt
2010	Winter's Bone	Debra Granik and Anne Rosellini
2011	The Descendants	Alexander Payne, Nat Faxon, and Jim Rash
2011	50/50	Will Reiser
2011	The Artist	Michel Hazanavicius
2011	Midnight in Paris	Woody Allen
2011	Win Win	Tom McCarthy
2012	Lincoln	Tony Kushner
2012	Argo	Chris Terrio
2012	Looper	Rian Johnson
2012	Silver Linings Playbook	David O. Russell
2012	Zero Dark Thirty	Mark Boal
2013	12 Years a Slave	John Ridley
2013	American Hustle	Eric Warren Singer and David O. Russell
2013	Before Midnight	Richard Linklater, Julie Delpy, and Ethan Hawke
2013	Her	Spike Jonze
2013	Inside Llewyn Davis	Joel Coen and Ethan Coen
2014	Boyhood	Richard Linklater
2014	Birdman	Alejandro G. Iñárritu, Nicolás Giacobone, Alexander Dinelaris Jr., and Armando Bo
2014	The Grand Budapest Hotel	Wes Anderson and Hugo Guinness
2014	Nightcrawler	Dan Gilroy
2014	Whiplash	Damien Chazelle
2015	Spotlight	Tom McCarthy and Josh Singer
2015	The Hateful Eight	Quentin Tarantino
2015	The Martian	Drew Goddard
2015	Room	Emma Donoghue
2015	Steve Jobs	Aaron Sorkin
2016	Hell or High Water	Taylor Sheridan
2016	Arrival	Eric Heisserer
2016	La La Land	Damien Chazelle
2016	Manchester by the Sea	Kenneth Lonergan
2016	Moonlight	Barry Jenkins
2017	Lady Bird	Greta Gerwig
2017	The Big Sick	Emily V. Gordon & Kumail Nanjiani
2017	Get Out	Jordan Peele
2017	The Post	Liz Hannah and Josh Singer
2017	Three Billboards Outside Ebbing, Missouri	Martin McDonagh
2018	The Favourite	Deborah Davis & Tony McNamara
2018	Eighth Grade	Bo Burnham
2018	First Reformed	Paul Schrader
2018	If Beale Street Could Talk	Barry Jenkins
2018	Vice	Adam McKay
2019	Knives Out	Rian Johnson
2019	The Farewell	Lulu Wang
2019	Marriage Story	Noah Baumbach
2019	Once Upon a Time in Hollywood	Quentin Tarantino
2019	Parasite	Bong Joon-ho and Han Jin-won

=== 2020s ===
Year	Winner	Writer(s)
2020	Promising Young Woman	Emerald Fennell
2020	Minari	Lee Isaac Chung
2020	Nomadland	Chloé Zhao
2020	One Night in Miami...	Kemp Powers
2020	Sound of Metal	Derek Cianfrance, Abraham Marder and Darius Marder
2020	The Trial of the Chicago 7	Aaron Sorkin
2021	The Power of the Dog	Jane Campion
2021	Belfast	Kenneth Branagh
2021	CODA	Sian Heder
2021	Don't Look Up	Adam McKay
2021	Licorice Pizza	Paul Thomas Anderson
2022	The Banshees of Inisherin	Martin McDonagh
2022	Everything Everywhere All at Once	Daniel Kwan Daniel Scheinert
2022	The Fabelmans	Steven Spielberg and Tony Kushner
2022	Tár	Todd Field
2022	Women Talking	Sarah Polley and Miriam Toews
2023	American Fiction	Cord Jefferson
2023	Barbie	Greta Gerwig and Noah Baumbach
2023	The Holdovers	David Hemingson
2023	Oppenheimer	Christopher Nolan
2023	Past Lives	Celine Song
2023	Poor Things	Tony McNamara
2024	Anora	Sean Baker
2024	The Brutalist	Brady Corbet and Mona Fastvold
2024	Conclave	Peter Straughan
2024	Nickel Boys	RaMell Ross and Joslyn Barnes
2024	A Real Pain	Jesse Eisenberg
2024	Sing Sing	Clint Bently and Greg Kwedar
