= Washington D.C. Area Film Critics Association Awards 2017 =

Annual US film awards ceremony

16th WAFCA Awards
- Date: December 8, 2017

Highlights
- Best Film: Get Out
- Best Director: Christopher Nolan for Dunkirk
- Best Actor: Gary Oldman
- Best Actress: Frances McDormand

The 16th Washington D.C. Area Film Critics Association Awards were announced on December 8, 2017.

== Winners and nominees ==
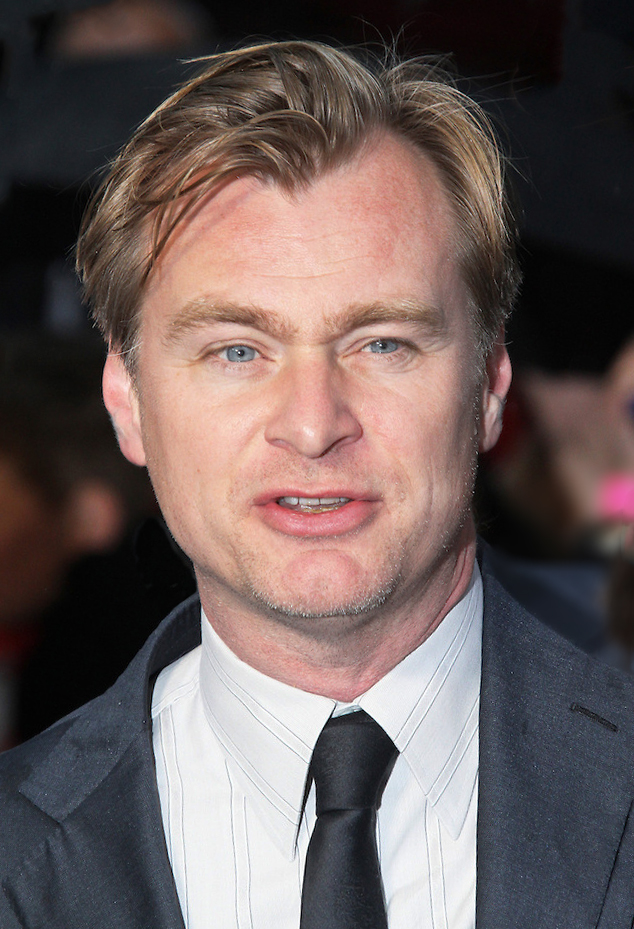
Christopher Nolan, Best Director winner

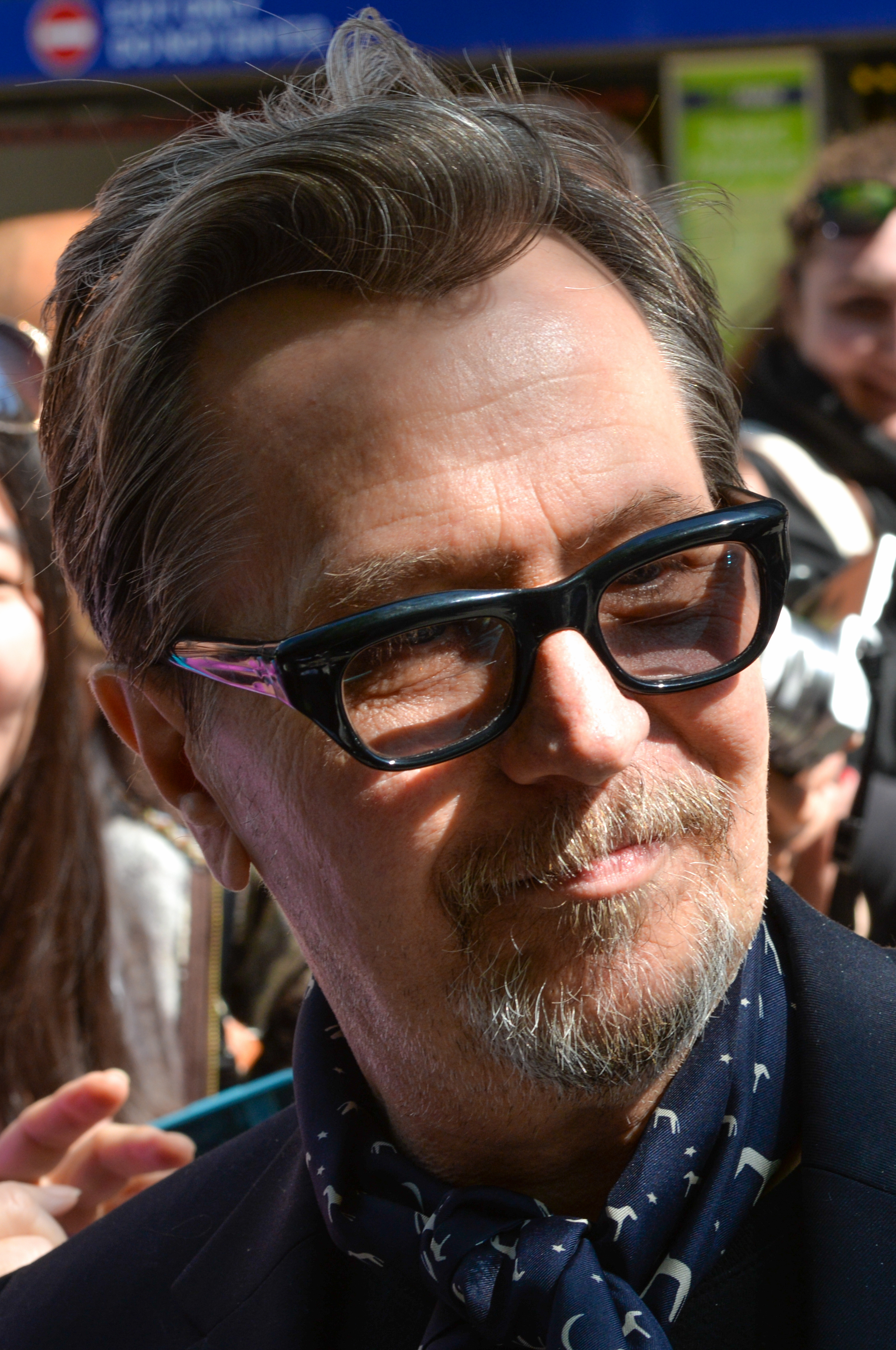
Gary Oldman, Best Actor winner

Frances McDormand, Best Actress winner

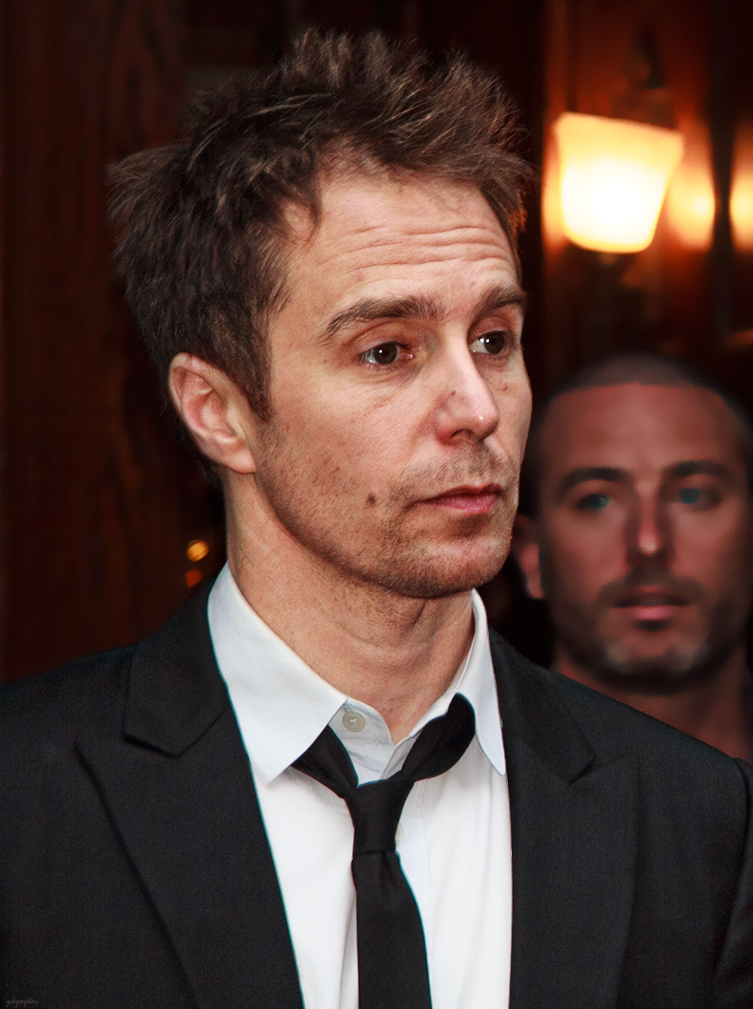
Sam Rockwell, Best Supporting Actor winner

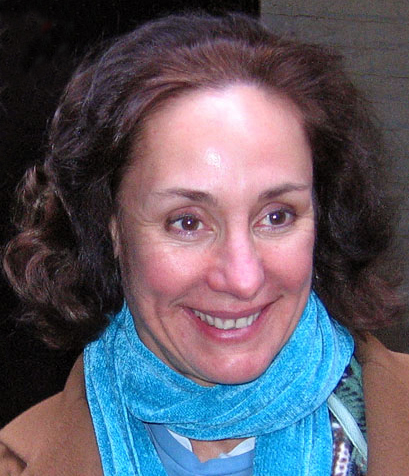
Laurie Metcalf, Best Supporting Actress winner

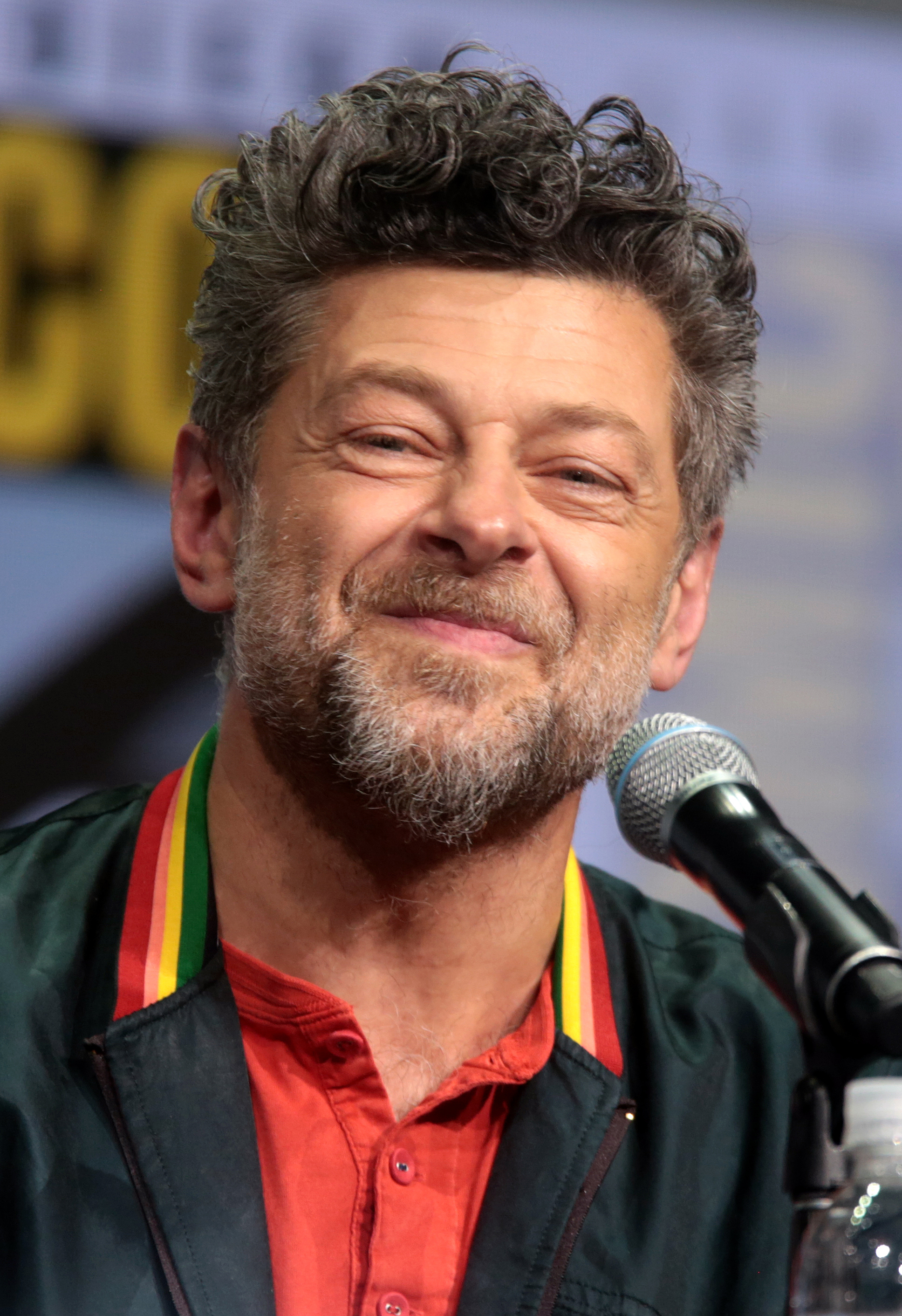
Andy Serkis, Best Motion Capture Performance winner

Best Film

- Get Out

- Call Me by Your Name
- Dunkirk
- Lady Bird
- Three Billboards Outside Ebbing, Missouri

Best Director

- Christopher Nolan – Dunkirk

- Guillermo del Toro – The Shape of Water
- Greta Gerwig – Lady Bird
- Jordan Peele – Get Out
- Dee Rees – Mudbound

Best Actor

- Gary Oldman – Darkest Hour

- Timothée Chalamet – Call Me by Your Name
- Daniel Day-Lewis – Phantom Thread
- James Franco – The Disaster Artist
- Daniel Kaluuya – Get Out

Best Actress

- Frances McDormand – Three Billboards Outside Ebbing, Missouri

- Sally Hawkins – The Shape of Water
- Margot Robbie – I, Tonya
- Saoirse Ronan – Lady Bird
- Meryl Streep – The Post

Best Supporting Actor

- Sam Rockwell – Three Billboards Outside Ebbing, Missouri

- Willem Dafoe – The Florida Project
- Armie Hammer – Call Me by Your Name
- Jason Mitchell – Mudbound
- Michael Stuhlbarg – Call Me by Your Name

Best Supporting Actress

- Laurie Metcalf – Lady Bird

- Mary J. Blige – Mudbound
- Tiffany Haddish – Girls Trip
- Holly Hunter – The Big Sick
- Allison Janney – I, Tonya

Best Adapted Screenplay

- Virgil Williams and Dee Rees – Mudbound

- Hampton Fancher and Michael Green, story by Hampton Fancher – Blade Runner 2049
- James Ivory – Call Me by Your Name
- Scott Neustadter and Michael H. Weber – The Disaster Artist
- Aaron Sorkin – Molly's Game

Best Original Screenplay

- Jordan Peele – Get Out

- Guillermo del Toro and Vanessa Taylor – The Shape of Water
- Greta Gerwig – Lady Bird
- Emily V. Gordon and Kumail Nanjiani – The Big Sick
- Martin McDonagh – Three Billboards Outside Ebbing, Missouri

Best Ensemble

- Three Billboards Outside Ebbing, Missouri – Frances McDormand, Woody Harrelson, Sam Rockwell, John Hawkes, Peter Dinklage, Lucas Hedges, Abbie Cornish, Samara Weaving, Caleb Landry Jones, Clarke Peters, Darrell Britt-Gibson, Kathryn Newton, Kerry Condon, and Željko Ivanek

- Dunkirk – Fionn Whitehead, Tom Glynn-Carney, Jack Lowden, Harry Styles, Aneurin Barnard, James D'Arcy, Barry Keoghan, Kenneth Branagh, Cillian Murphy, Mark Rylance, and Tom Hardy
- It – Jaeden Lieberher, Bill Skarsgård, Wyatt Oleff, Jeremy Ray Taylor, Sophia Lillis, Finn Wolfhard, Jack Dylan Grazer, Chosen Jacobs, Nicholas Hamilton, and Jackson Robert Scott
- Mudbound – Carey Mulligan, Garrett Hedlund, Jason Clarke, Jason Mitchell, Mary J. Blige, Jonathan Banks, and Rob Morgan
- The Post – Meryl Streep, Tom Hanks, Sarah Paulson, Bob Odenkirk, Tracy Letts, Bradley Whitford, Bruce Greenwood, Carrie Coon, and Matthew Rhys

Best Animated Feature

- Coco

- The Breadwinner
- Despicable Me 3
- The Lego Batman Movie
- Loving Vincent
- The Boss Baby
- Cars 3

Best Documentary Film

- Jane

- City of Ghosts
- Faces Places
- An Inconvenient Sequel: Truth to Power
- Step

Best Foreign Language Film

- BPM (Beats per Minute) • France

- First They Killed My Father • Cambodia
- In the Fade • Germany
- The Square • Sweden
- Thelma • Norway

Best Cinematography

- Roger Deakins – Blade Runner 2049

- Dan Laustsen – The Shape of Water
- Rachel Morrison – Mudbound
- Sayombhu Mukdeeprom – Call Me by Your Name
- Hoyte van Hoytema – Dunkirk

Best Editing

- Paul Machliss and Jonathan Amos – Baby Driver

- Gregory Plotkin – Get Out
- Lee Smith – Dunkirk
- Joe Walker – Blade Runner 2049
- Sidney Wolinsky – The Shape of Water

Best Original Score

- Hans Zimmer and Benjamin Wallfisch – Blade Runner 2049

- Carter Burwell – Three Billboards Outside Ebbing, Missouri
- Alexandre Desplat – The Shape of Water
- Michael Giacchino – Coco
- Hans Zimmer – Dunkirk

Best Production Design

- Dennis Gassner (production design) and Alessandra Querzola (set decoration) – Blade Runner 2049

- Paul Denham Austerberry (production design), Shane Vieau (set decoration), and Jeff Melvin (set decoration) – The Shape of Water
- Aline Bonetto (production design) and Anna Lynch-Robinson (set decoration) – Wonder Woman
- Nathan Crowley (production design) and Gary Fettis (set decoration) – Dunkirk
- Sarah Greenwood (production design) and Katie Spencer (set decoration) – Beauty and the Beast

Best Youth Performance

- Brooklynn Prince – The Florida Project

- Dafne Keen – Logan
- Sophia Lillis – It
- Millicent Simmonds – Wonderstruck
- Jacob Tremblay – Wonder

Best Animated Voice Performance

- Anthony Gonzalez – Coco

- Will Arnett – The Lego Batman Movie
- Gael García Bernal – Coco
- Michael Cera – The Lego Batman Movie
- Bradley Cooper – Guardians of the Galaxy Vol. 2

Best Motion Capture Performance

- Andy Serkis – War for the Planet of the Apes

- Dan Stevens – Beauty and the Beast
- Steve Zahn – War for the Planet of the Apes
- Taika Waititi – Thor: Ragnarok

The Joe Barber Award for Best Portrayal of Washington, D.C.

- The Post

- An Inconvenient Sequel: Truth to Power
- Last Flag Flying
- Mark Felt: The Man Who Brought Down the White House
- Spider-Man: Homecoming

== Multiple nominations and awards ==
These films had multiple nominations:

- 7 nominations: Dunkirk and The Shape of Water
- 6 nominations: Call Me by Your Name, Mudbound, and Three Billboards Outside Ebbing, Missouri
- 5 nominations: Blade Runner 2049, Get Out, and Lady Bird
- 4 nominations: Coco
- 3 nominations: The Lego Batman Movie
- 2 nominations: An Inconvenient Sequel: Truth to Power, The Big Sick, Beauty and the Beast, The Disaster Artist, The Florida Project, It, I, Tonya, The Post, and War for the Planet of the Apes

The following films received multiple awards:

- 3 wins: Blade Runner 2049 and Three Billboards Outside Ebbing, Missouri
- 2 wins: Coco and Get Out
