= The Big Sick =

2017 American romantic comedy-drama film by Michael Showalter

- Theatrical release poster
- Directed by: Michael Showalter
- Written by: Emily V. Gordon; Kumail Nanjiani
- Produced by: Judd Apatow; Barry Mendel
- Starring: Kumail Nanjiani; Zoe Kazan; Holly Hunter; Ray Romano; Anupam Kher
- Cinematography: Brian Burgoyne
- Edited by: Robert Nassau
- Music by: Michael Andrews
- Production companies: FilmNation Entertainment; Apatow Productions
- Distributed by: Amazon Studios; Lionsgate
- Release dates: January 20, 2017 (Sundance); June 23, 2017 (United States)
- Running time: 120 minutes
- Country: United States
- Language: English
- Budget: $5 million
- Box office: $56.4 million

The Big Sick is a 2017 American romantic comedy-drama film directed by Michael Showalter and written by Emily V. Gordon and Kumail Nanjiani. It stars Nanjiani, Zoe Kazan, Holly Hunter, Ray Romano, Adeel Akhtar, and Anupam Kher. Gordon and Nanjiani wrote the film based on their relationship; it follows an interracial couple who must deal with cultural differences after Emily (Kazan) becomes ill.

The film had its world premiere at the Sundance Film Festival on January 20, 2017. It began a limited theatrical release on June 23, 2017, by Amazon Studios and Lionsgate, before going wide on July 14, 2017. One of the most acclaimed films of 2017, it was chosen by American Film Institute as one of the top 10 films of the year and was nominated for the Academy Award for Best Original Screenplay. With a budget of $5 million, it grossed $56 million worldwide, becoming one of the highest-grossing independent films of 2017.

== Plot ==
Kumail is a struggling standup comedian, who hooks up with a UChicago grad student, Emily, after a performance at the local comedy club. Despite being from different races (Kumail is ethnically Pakistani while Emily is white), they start dating. After a few months, Emily confronts Kumail about photographs of other women she found in his apartment. Kumail says it's 'just a cultural thing' (these are women he has met for an arranged marriage), but Emily rejects the idea and breaks up with him.

Deciding to focus on his career, Kumail targets a spot at the Montreal Comedy Festival. He is offered to audition, and hooks up with an audience member that same night. Lying in bed, Kumail receives a distress call, informing him that Emily needs help after being admitted to the hospital.

Kumail goes to check on her, where doctors use his signature to place Emily in a medical coma, then asking him to inform her family. The next day, Terry and Beth arrive from North Carolina. They are cold towards Kumail, but he continues checking in on Emily. Eventually, the three bond when doctors prepare Emily for surgery. Terry and Beth defend Kumail from racial hecklers at the comedy club, and spend the night with him at Emily's apartment, playing drinking games.

Kumail ignores his family's calls, as they attempt to set him up with other women for an arranged marriage. His parents show up at his apartment, leading to an argument in which they threaten to disown him. That evening, Emily's condition worsens, and Kumail bombs his Montreal audition as a result.

Miraculously, Emily responds to anti-inflammatory treatment the next morning, and awakens from coma. She is diagnosed with a rare adult-onset Still's disease, but will fully recover. Unaware that Kumail was by her side throughout, she refuses to meet him and rejects his idea to get back together.

Dejected, Kumail decides to leave for New York with his comedian friends, and start over in pursuit of a career in standup. Emily hears the news and is disappointed. Kumail's parents are shocked by his decision, but bid him farewell nonetheless, showing that they mean to patch things up with him.

In New York, Kumail performs a new set at a local club. He is heckled/cheered by an audience member, who turns out to be Emily. She announces she is there to see 'someone'. During the credits, photographs of the wedding between Kumail and Emily are shown, showing that Kumail's parents and family attended.

== Cast ==
- Kumail Nanjiani as a fictionalized version of himself, an aspiring stand-up comic
- Zoe Kazan as Emily Gardner, Kumail's girlfriend. She is a fictionalized version of Kumail's wife Emily V. Gordon
- Holly Hunter as Beth Gardner, Emily's mother
- Ray Romano as Terry Gardner, Emily's father
- Anupam Kher as Azmat Nanjiani, Kumail's father
- Zenobia Shroff as Sharmeen Nanjiani, Kumail's mother
- Adeel Akhtar as Naveed Nanjiani, Kumail's brother
- Bo Burnham as CJ, a stand-up comic and Kumail's friend
- Aidy Bryant as Mary, a stand-up comic and Kumail's friend
- Kurt Braunohler as Chris, a stand-up comic and Kumail's friend and roommate
- Vella Lovell as Khadija, a woman Kumail's parents set him up with
- Jeremy Shamos as Bob Dalavan, a talent agent
- David Alan Grier as Andy Dodd, the owner of the Playground Stadium and MC for its comedy shows
- Ed Herbstman as Sam Highsmith, a stand-up comic who is not liked by the others
- Shenaz Treasurywala as Fatima Nanjiani, Kumail's sister-in-law
- Rebecca Naomi Jones as Jesse
- Kuhoo Verma as Zubeida
- Mitra Jouhari as Yazmin
- Celeste Arias as Denise
- Jeff Blumenkrantz as Dr. Wright
- Linda Emond as Dr. Cunningham
- Susham Bedi as Tina, Khadija's mother
- Rahul Bedi as Farhan, Khadija's father

== Production ==
=== Development ===
In December 2015, it was announced Kumail Nanjiani would star in the film from a screenplay written by him and wife Emily V. Gordon, while Judd Apatow would produce alongside Barry Mendel, under their Apatow Productions banner, with FilmNation Entertainment financing the film. Michael Andrews composed the film's score.

=== Casting ===
In February 2016, Zoe Kazan joined the cast, along with Holly Hunter and Ray Romano in April 2016. Unlike many of the other portrayals in The Big Sick, Romano's and Hunter's roles in the film were not modeled after Emily V. Gordon's actual parents. Instead, Hunter said that she never contacted or spoke with Gordon's mother before playing the part, as she wanted to "feel my own freedom with the character". In May 2016, Aidy Bryant, Bo Burnham, Adeel Akhtar and Kurt Braunohler also joined the cast of the film. David Alan Grier was cast in The Big Sick after he met with Gordon when she was a writer for The Carmichael Show. Grier's role was part of a larger subplot that was ultimately cut from the film's release.

Anupam Kher's casting in the film was reported in June 2016. He was directly contacted by Kumail Nanjiani, as Nanjiani's father had recommended Kher play the role. According to Kher, his character's last scene in the film was the first scene he had filmed for the production. The Big Sick marks Kher's 500th appearance in a feature film.

=== Writing ===
The screenplay for The Big Sick is written by Emily V. Gordon and her husband Kumail Nanjiani and is loosely based on the real-life courtship between them before their marriage in 2007. According to Nanjiani, the idea to make a script about them was first inspired by the film's eventual co-producer Judd Apatow when the two met while appearing in a 2012 episode of the You Made It Weird podcast. Developed over the course of three years, the script has been called semi-autobiographical because, in addition to the two lead characters modeled after them, many of the events occurring during Gordon and Nanjiani's relationship are noted as being portrayed to an extent in the film.

Though not part of the original script, a real-life incident involving Holly Hunter heckling an unnamed player during a US Open tennis match inspired a similar scene in the film where Nanjiani's character is heckled during one of his stand-up sets.

=== Filming ===
Principal photography began on May 11, 2016.

== Release ==
The Big Sick premiered at the Sundance Film Festival on January 20, 2017. Shortly after, Amazon Studios acquired distribution rights to the film, after bids from Sony Pictures Worldwide Acquisitions, Fox Searchlight Pictures, Focus Features and Paramount Pictures. The $12 million acquisition marked the second-largest deal of the 2017 festival. Lionsgate partnered with Amazon on the U.S. release, and spent around $20 million on marketing the film. It also screened at South by Southwest on March 16, 2017, where it won an Audience Award in the category Festival Favorites. The film began a limited release on June 23, 2017, before going wide on July 14, 2017.

== Reception ==
=== Box office ===
The Big Sick grossed $42.9 million in the United States and Canada, and $13.4 million in other territories, for a total gross of $56.2 million.

In the film's limited opening weekend, it made $421,577 from five theaters (a per-theater gross of $84,315, the best of 2017 until Lady Bird in November), finishing 17th at the box office. The film expanded to 2,597 theaters on July 14, 2017, and was projected to gross $9–11 million over the weekend. It grossed $7.6 million over the weekend, finishing fifth at the box office. On July 25, the film crossed $26 million, becoming the second highest-grossing independent film of 2017.

=== Critical response ===
On review aggregator Rotten Tomatoes, the film holds an approval rating of 98% based on 306 reviews, with an average rating of 8.30/10. The site's critical consensus reads, "Funny, heartfelt, and intelligent, The Big Sick uses its appealing leads and cross-cultural themes to prove the standard romcom formula still has some fresh angles left to explore." It was rated as Rotten Tomatoes' #1 summer movie of 2017. On Metacritic, the film received an average score of 86 out of 100, based on 47 critics, indicating "universal acclaim". Audiences polled by CinemaScore gave the film an average grade of "A" on an A+ to F scale.

In a review for the Toronto Star, Peter Howell gave The Big Sick four stars out of four, praising the film as "hilarious and heartbreaking", as well as applauding the performances of the entire cast. Richard Roeper of the Chicago Sun-Times praised the film: "It is funny and smart and wise and silly, it is romantic and sweet and just cynical enough, and it is without a doubt one of the best romantic comedies I have seen in a long time." The Big Sick was also selected as an "NYT Critic's Pick" by Manohla Dargis of The New York Times. In her review, Dargis praised Michael Showalter's direction and the screenplay by Emily V. Gordon and Kumail Nanjiani for "revitalizing an often moribund subgenre with a true story of love, death and the everyday comedy of being a 21st-century American."

While praising the lead performances, Robbie Collin of The Daily Telegraph wrote a mixed review for The Big Sick. Collin contends that director Showalter "never comes close to dampening down its leading couple's inextinguishable appeal." In a negative review for The New Yorker, Richard Brody wrote that the film "suffers from an excess of pleasantness, and this very pleasantness thins out its substance, blands out its tone, weakens its comedy."

=== Controversy ===
There was backlash against the movie due to South Asian women being portrayed as stereotypical and undesirable. Also, Vella Lovell, an actress who is not of South Asian descent, played a Pakistani love interest with a strained accent.

In 2021, Kumail Nanjiani said, "Our movie was the first one in a long time where there were multiple Desi female characters, and the first few you see are reduced...People wanted to see themselves. It's something I completely regret. I would not do it that way now."

=== Accolades ===
According to a poll conducted by AwardsDaily in July 2017, polling one hundred critics, The Big Sick was voted the second best film of 2017 so far, behind Get Out.

Award	Date of ceremony	Category	Recipient(s)	Result	Ref.
AARP's Movies for Grownups Awards	February 5, 2018	Best Supporting Actress	Holly Hunter	Nominated	
AARP's Movies for Grownups Awards	February 5, 2018	Best Intergenerational Film	The Big Sick	Nominated	
Academy Awards	March 4, 2018	Best Original Screenplay	Emily V. Gordon and Kumail Nanjiani	Nominated	
American Film Institute	January 5, 2018	Top Ten Films of the Year	The Big Sick	Won	
Austin Film Critics Association	January 8, 2018	Best Supporting Actress	Holly Hunter	Nominated	
Austin Film Critics Association	January 8, 2018	Best Original Screenplay	Emily V. Gordon and Kumail Nanjiani	Nominated	
Austin Film Critics Association	January 8, 2018	Top 10 Films	The Big Sick	9th Place	
Chicago Film Critics Association	December 12, 2017	Best Supporting Actress	Holly Hunter	Nominated	
Chicago Film Critics Association	December 12, 2017	Best Original Screenplay	Emily V. Gordon and Kumail Nanjiani	Nominated	
Critics' Choice Movie Awards	January 11, 2018	Best Picture	The Big Sick	Nominated	
Critics' Choice Movie Awards	January 11, 2018	Best Supporting Actress	Holly Hunter	Nominated	
Critics' Choice Movie Awards	January 11, 2018	Best Original Screenplay	Emily V. Gordon and Kumail Nanjiani	Nominated	
Critics' Choice Movie Awards	January 11, 2018	Best Comedy	The Big Sick	Won	
Critics' Choice Movie Awards	January 11, 2018	Best Actor in a Comedy	Kumail Nanjiani	Nominated	
Critics' Choice Movie Awards	January 11, 2018	Best Actress in a Comedy	Zoe Kazan	Nominated	
Dallas–Fort Worth Film Critics Association	December 13, 2017	Best Supporting Actress	Holly Hunter	4th Place	
Detroit Film Critics Society	December 7, 2017	Best Screenplay	Emily V. Gordon and Kumail Nanjiani	Nominated	
Detroit Film Critics Society	December 7, 2017	Best Supporting Actress	Holly Hunter	Nominated	
Detroit Film Critics Society	December 7, 2017	Best Ensemble	The cast of The Big Sick	Nominated	
Empire Awards	March 18, 2018	Best Comedy	The Big Sick	Nominated	
Florida Film Critics Circle	December 23, 2017	Best Supporting Actress	Holly Hunter	Nominated	
Florida Film Critics Circle	December 23, 2017	Best Original Screenplay	Emily V. Gordon and Kumail Nanjiani	Nominated	
Florida Film Critics Circle	December 23, 2017	Best Cast	The cast of The Big Sick	Nominated	
Georgia Film Critics Association	January 12, 2018	Best Picture	The Big Sick	Nominated	
Georgia Film Critics Association	January 12, 2018	Best Supporting Actress	Holly Hunter	Nominated	
Georgia Film Critics Association	January 12, 2018	Best Original Screenplay	Emily V. Gordon and Kumail Nanjiani	Nominated	
Gotham Awards	November 27, 2017	Best Screenplay	Emily V. Gordon and Kumail Nanjiani	Nominated	
Houston Film Critics Society	January 6, 2018	Best Picture	The Big Sick	Nominated	
Houston Film Critics Society	January 6, 2018	Best Supporting Actress	Holly Hunter	Nominated	
Houston Film Critics Society	January 6, 2018	Best Screenplay	Emily V. Gordon and Kumail Nanjiani	Nominated	
Humanitas Prize	February 16, 2018	Feature – Comedy	Emily V. Gordon and Kumail Nanjiani	Nominated	
IGN Awards	December 19, 2017	Movie of the Year	The Big Sick	Nominated	
IGN Awards	December 19, 2017	Best Comedy Movie	The Big Sick	Runner-up	
IGN Awards	December 19, 2017	Best Lead Performer in a Movie	Kumail Nanjiani	Nominated	
IGN Awards	December 19, 2017	Best Supporting Performer in a Movie	Holly Hunter	Nominated	
IGN Awards	December 19, 2017	Best Supporting Performer in a Movie	Ray Romano	Nominated	
Independent Spirit Awards	March 3, 2018	Best Supporting Female	Holly Hunter	Nominated	
Independent Spirit Awards	March 3, 2018	Best First Screenplay	Emily V. Gordon and Kumail Nanjiani	Won	
IndieWire Critics Poll	December 19, 2017	Best Supporting Actress	Holly Hunter	4th Place	
London Film Critics' Circle	January 28, 2018	Supporting Actress of the Year	Holly Hunter	Nominated	
Make-Up Artists and Hair Stylists Guild	February 24, 2018	Feature Motion Picture: Best Contemporary Makeup	Kirsten Sylvester and Leo Won	Nominated	
Make-Up Artists and Hair Stylists Guild	February 24, 2018	Feature Motion Picture: Best Contemporary Hair Styling	Tonia Ciccone and Toni Roman-grimm	Nominated	
Online Film Critics Society	December 28, 2017	Best Supporting Actress	Holly Hunter	Nominated	
Palm Springs International Film Festival	January 2, 2018	Career Achievement Award	Holly Hunter	Won	
Producers Guild of America Awards	January 20, 2018	Best Theatrical Motion Picture	Judd Apatow and Barry Mendel	Nominated	
San Diego Film Critics Society	December 11, 2017	Best Supporting Actress	Holly Hunter	Nominated	
San Diego Film Critics Society	December 11, 2017	Best Original Screenplay	Emily V. Gordon and Kumail Nanjiani	Nominated	
San Diego Film Critics Society	December 11, 2017	Best Comedic Performance	Ray Romano	Nominated	
San Francisco Film Critics Circle	December 10, 2017	Best Supporting Actress	Holly Hunter	Nominated	
San Francisco Film Critics Circle	December 10, 2017	Best Original Screenplay	Emily V. Gordon and Kumail Nanjiani	Nominated	
Santa Barbara International Film Festival	January 31, 2018	Virtuoso Award	Kumail Nanjiani	Won	
Satellite Awards	February 10, 2018	Best Film	The Big Sick	Nominated	
Satellite Awards	February 10, 2018	Best Supporting Actress	Holly Hunter	Nominated	
Screen Actors Guild Awards	January 21, 2018	Outstanding Performance by a Cast in a Motion Picture	The cast of The Big Sick	Nominated	
Screen Actors Guild Awards	January 21, 2018	Outstanding Performance by a Female Actor in a Supporting Role	Holly Hunter	Nominated	
Seattle Film Critics Society	December 18, 2017	Best Supporting Actress	Holly Hunter	Nominated	
Seattle Film Critics Society	December 18, 2017	Best Screenplay	Emily V. Gordon and Kumail Nanjiani	Nominated	
South by Southwest	March 18, 2017	Audience Award: Festival Favorites	The Big Sick	Won	
St. Louis Film Critics Association	December 17, 2017	Best Supporting Actress	Holly Hunter	Runner-up	
St. Louis Film Critics Association	December 17, 2017	Best Original Screenplay	Emily V. Gordon and Kumail Nanjiani	Nominated	
Washington D.C. Area Film Critics Association	December 8, 2017	Best Supporting Actress	Holly Hunter	Nominated	
Washington D.C. Area Film Critics Association	December 8, 2017	Best Original Screenplay	Emily V. Gordon and Kumail Nanjiani	Nominated	
Women Film Critics Circle	December 17, 2017	Best Screen Couple	The Big Sick	Won	
Writers Guild of America Awards	February 11, 2018	Best Original Screenplay	Emily V. Gordon and Kumail Nanjiani	Nominated	

== See also ==
- Satte Pe Satta. At minute 1:54:56 in The Big Sick, the father of the co-star (played by Kumail Nanjiani) reveals that he and the mother saw Satte Pe Satta on their first date.
