= The Nest (novel) =

2016 novel by Cynthia D'Aprix Sweeney

- First edition
- Author: Cynthia D'Aprix Sweeney
- Language: English
- Published: 22 March 2016 (Ecco Press)
- Publication place: United States
- Media type: Print (Hardcover)
- ISBN: 978-0-06-241421-2

The Nest is the bestselling debut novel by Cynthia D'Aprix Sweeney, published on March 22, 2016. The book debuted at #3 on the New York Times Best Seller list in Hardcover Fiction for April 10, 2016, and rose to #2 the following week, when it also debuted at #3 on the combined print and e-book list.

== Plot and main characters ==
Leo, Melody, Jack and Bea are four siblings of the Plumb family living in and around New York. They are set to receive money from a trust fund, which they call the "Nest", when Melody, the youngest, turns 40. However, Leo's reckless actions at a wedding party necessitate premature withdrawals from the Nest, causing tension among the siblings.

- Leo: Former director of a popular magazine and website
- Jack: Antiques dealer and husband to Walker; Jack is secretly in debt
- Bea: A writer associated with the "Glitterary Girls" set
- Melody: A helicopter parent mother to twin daughters who are preparing for college admissions

== Reception ==
The literary imprint Ecco obtained world English rights to the book for a seven-figure deal.

According to Los Angeles Times, "The Nest is an addictive, poignant read with an enticing premise: four adult siblings fighting over the trust fund they're all counting on to bail them out of their particular disappointments and self-inflicted disasters." The Washington Post slated the book as "a comedy of filial greed and affection." The New York Times reported "Ms. Sweeney writes like a pro when it comes to moving her chess pieces around a crowded board."
