= The Post (film) =

2017 film by Steven Spielberg

- Theatrical release poster
- Directed by: Steven Spielberg
- Written by: Josh Singer; Liz Hannah
- Produced by: Steven Spielberg; Kristie Macosko Krieger; Amy Pascal
- Starring: Meryl Streep; Tom Hanks; Sarah Paulson; Bob Odenkirk; Tracy Letts; Bradley Whitford; Bruce Greenwood; Matthew Rhys
- Cinematography: Janusz Kamiński
- Edited by: Michael Kahn; Sarah Broshar
- Music by: John Williams
- Production companies: 20th Century Fox; DreamWorks Pictures; Participant Media; Amblin Partners; Amblin Entertainment; Pascal Pictures; Star Thrower Entertainment
- Distributed by: 20th Century Fox
- Release dates: December 14, 2017 (Newseum); December 22, 2017 (United States)
- Running time: 116 minutes
- Country: United States
- Language: English
- Budget: $50 million
- Box office: $179.8 million

The Post is a 2017 American political thriller film about The Washington Post and the publication of the Pentagon Papers. It was directed and produced by Steven Spielberg, and written by Liz Hannah and Josh Singer. It stars Meryl Streep as Katharine Graham, the publisher of the Washington Post, and Tom Hanks as Ben Bradlee, the longtime executive editor of The Washington Post, with Sarah Paulson, Bob Odenkirk, Tracy Letts, Bradley Whitford, David Cross, Bruce Greenwood, Carrie Coon, Alison Brie, and Matthew Rhys in supporting roles.

Set in 1971, The Post depicts the true story of attempts by journalists at The Washington Post to publish the infamous Pentagon Papers, a set of classified documents regarding 30-year involvement of the United States government in the Vietnam War and earlier in French Indochina back to the 1940s.

Principal photography began in New York City in May 2017 and wrapped in July 2017. The film premiered at the Newseum in Washington, D.C., on December 14, 2017, and went into limited release in the United States by 20th Century Fox on December 22, 2017. It entered wide release on January 12, 2018, and grossed $179 million worldwide.

The film received positive reviews; critics praised Spielberg's direction, the performances (particularly Streep, Hanks, and Odenkirk) and the film's references and allusions to the presidencies of Richard Nixon and then-incumbent Donald Trump. The Post was chosen by the National Board of Review as the best film of 2017 and was named as one of the top 10 films of the year by Time magazine and the American Film Institute. The Post was nominated for Best Picture and Best Actress (for Streep) at the 90th Academy Awards, and received six nominations at the 75th Golden Globe Awards: Best Motion Picture – Drama, Best Director, Best Actress – Drama (for Streep), Best Actor – Drama (for Hanks), Best Screenplay, and Best Original Score.

== Plot ==
In 1966, U.S. State Department analyst Daniel Ellsberg is embedded with American soldiers in Vietnam. He documents the conflict's on-the-ground reality and soon realizes the Vietnam War is unwinnable. Upon returning to the U.S., he delivers his report to Secretary of Defense Robert McNamara, who agrees. However, Ellsberg is left disillusioned when McNamara publicly continues justifying deploying more American troops.

After his mission ends, Ellsberg works for the RAND Corporation, a think-tank with access to classified information. Over the following years he secretly copies thousands of classified pages documenting long-term U.S. interference in Vietnam, dating back to the Truman administration; once he finishes copying the full collection, he leaks it to journalist Neil Sheehan at The New York Times.

In 1971, Katharine Graham has been the owner and publisher of provincial newspaper The Washington Post for eight years since the suicide of her husband Phil Graham, the former publisher, and the death of her father Eugene Meyer, the former owner. Though lacking journalistic and business experience, Graham hopes to take the company public and secure investment for higher-quality national news. She appoints the bullish Ben Bradlee as the Post's executive editor.

Bradlee aligns with Graham's vision, but her male-dominated board view her as a widowed woman in over her head. Graham is also a prominent D.C. socialite, so Bradlee has to repeatedly assert his editorial independence whenever the paper runs a story critical of her friends. McNamara, one of these friends, tells Graham that an "unflattering" story about him is being published the next day in The New York Times—the first of Sheehan's scoops from Ellsberg's documents.

As the Post's editors discuss how they might further pursue the story, an anonymous woman leaves one hundred pages of the leaked documents on a reporter's desk. Bradlee sees it as a chance get ahead of the Times on a major story in the Post's own backyard, but a federal district court issues its injunction against the Times. Graham—concerned about both the Post's liability and her own social standing—orders Bradlee to respect the injunction.

Post assistant editor Ben Bagdikian tracks down Ellsberg, a former colleague at RAND, as the source. Ellsberg gives him the full 4,000-page report and Post reporters dig through the pages, but their attorneys advise against publishing lest Richard Nixon's administration file criminal charges. Agonizing over whether to publish, Graham confers with McNamara and her disapproving board. They warn that she will face social exile in D.C., retaliation from President Richard Nixon, and loss of investors.

However, Bradlee argues that they have a strong public-interest defense, and it could transform the Post into the important journalistic institution that Graham aims for. The documents also revealed that his own circle of elite D.C. friends, including John F. Kennedy, lied to him to garner sympathetic coverage; he argues that Graham's friendships with figures like McNamara should not influence her decision.

Graham gives the go-ahead to print. However, Bagdikian then reveals he used the same source as Sheehan instead of independently verifying the documents. The Post's lawyers panic—it puts Graham and Bradlee in contempt of court under the original injunction. This opens them to further criminal liability under the Espionage Act.

The Post and Times appear before the Supreme Court to plead their First Amendment rights. In solidarity, other newspapers across the U.S. publish information from Ellsberg's documents. On June 30, 1971, the Supreme Court rules 6–3 in the newspapers' favor, vindicating Graham's decision. In response, Nixon permanently bars the Post from the White House.

One year later, Watergate complex security guard Frank Wills discovers a burglary-in-progress and calls the police, inadvertently kicking off the Watergate scandal.

== Cast ==
- Meryl Streep as Katharine Graham
- Tom Hanks as Ben Bradlee
- Sarah Paulson as Antoinette "Tony" Pinchot Bradlee
- Bob Odenkirk as Ben Bagdikian
- Tracy Letts as Fritz Beebe
- Bradley Whitford as Arthur Parsons
- Bruce Greenwood as Robert McNamara
- Carolyn McCormick as Margaret McNamara
- Matthew Rhys as Daniel Ellsberg
- Alison Brie as Lally Graham Weymouth
- Carrie Coon as Meg Greenfield
- Jesse Plemons as Roger Clark
- David Cross as Howard Simons
- Zach Woods as Anthony Essaye
- Michael Stuhlbarg as A. M. Rosenthal
- David Costabile as Art Buchwald
- Pat Healy as Philip L. Geyelin
- John Rue as Gene Patterson
- Rick Holmes as Murrey Marder
- Philip Casnoff as Chalmers Roberts
- Jessie Mueller as Judith Martin
- Stark Sands as Donald E. Graham
- Michael Cyril Creighton as Jake
- Coral Peña as Nancy
- Brent Langdon as Paul Ignatius
- Gary Wilmes as Punch Sulzberger
- Christopher Innvar as James L. Greenfield
- James Riordan as Vice Admiral Joseph Francis Blouin
- Kelly AuCoin as Assistant Attorney General Kevin Maroney
- Tom Bair as William Rehnquist (voice)
- Jennifer Dundas as Liz Hylton
- Cotter Smith as William Macomber
- Justin Swain as Neil Sheehan
- Will Denton as Michael, The Runner
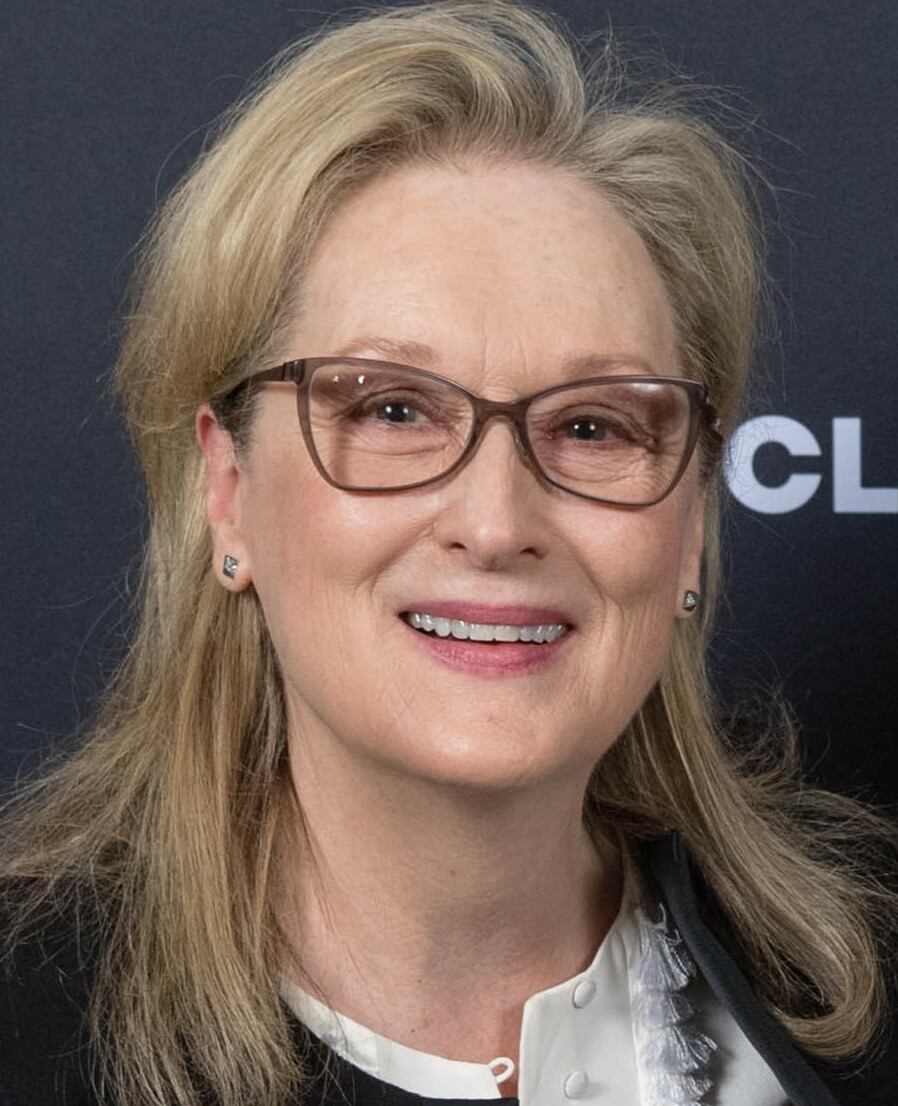
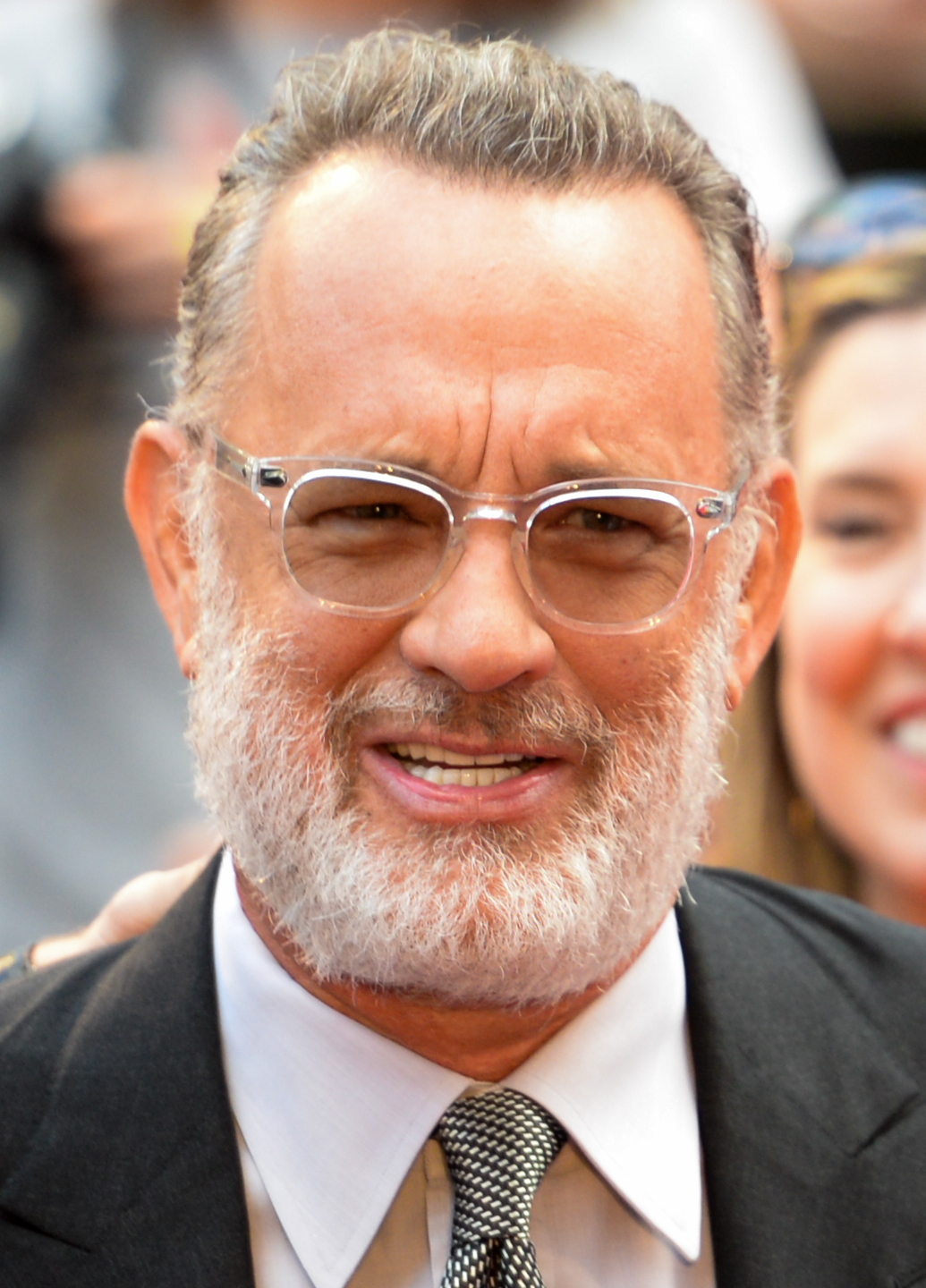
Meryl Streep (left) and Tom Hanks play Katharine Graham and Ben Bradlee, respectively. Streep garnered critical acclaim for her performance as Graham, earning a nomination for the Academy Award for Best Actress.

== Production ==
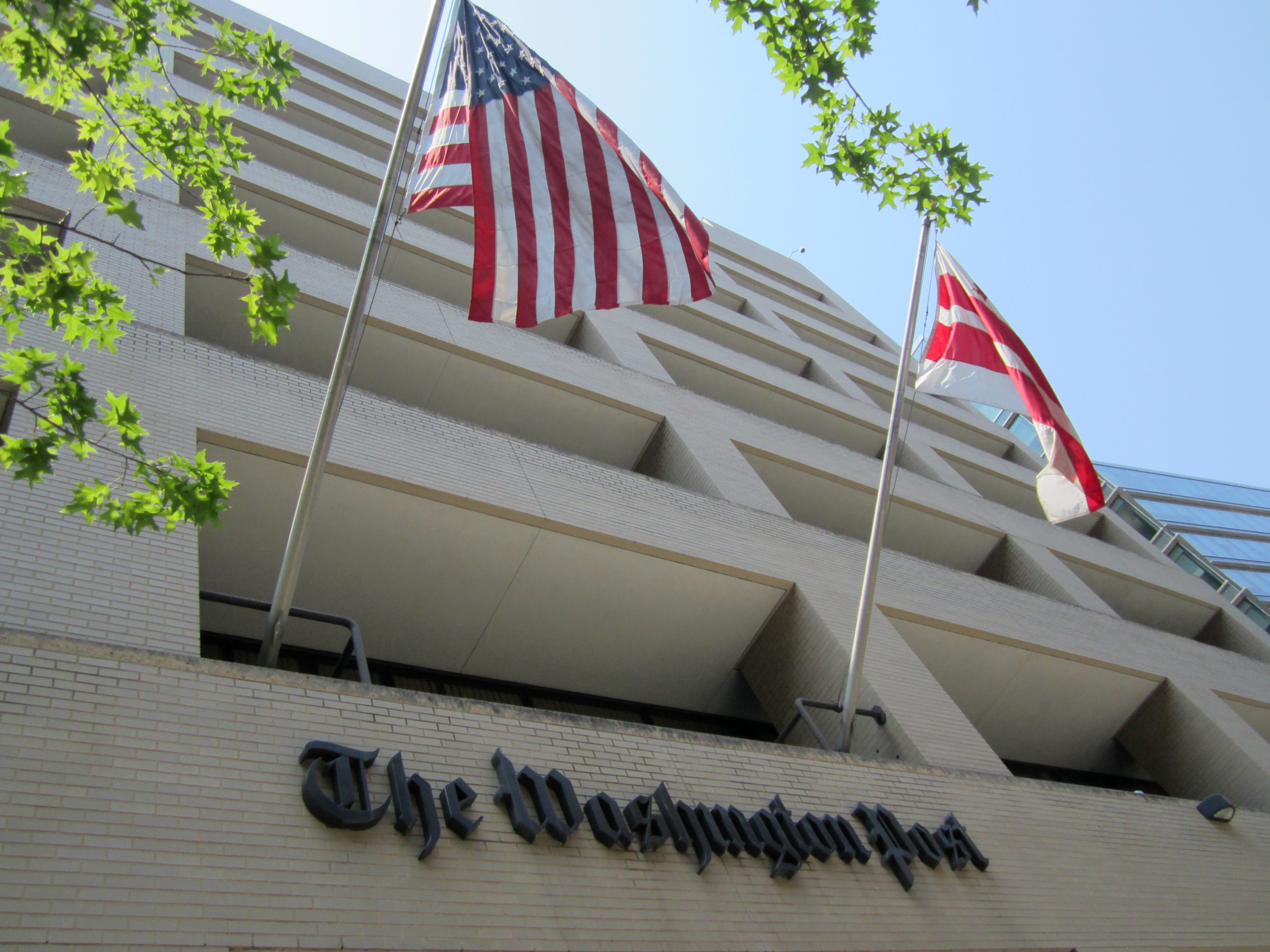
Previous HQ of The Washington Post on 15th Street NW in Washington, D.C.

In October 2016, Amy Pascal won a bid for the rights to the screenplay The Post, written by Liz Hannah. In February 2017, Steven Spielberg cancelled The Kidnapping of Edgardo Mortara with The Weinstein Company after a casting setback, and consequently opened his schedule to other potential films to direct. The following month, it was announced that Spielberg was in negotiations to direct and produce the film, with Meryl Streep and Tom Hanks in talks for the roles of Katharine Graham and Ben Bradlee, respectively. The Post is the first time that Spielberg, Streep, and Hanks had all worked together on a film.

Spielberg read the screenplay and decided to direct the film as soon as possible, saying that "when I read the first draft of the script, this wasn't something that could wait three years or two years — this was a story I felt we needed to tell today." Spielberg worked on The Post while post-production work continued on the visual-effects-heavy Ready Player One, a situation familiar to him from concurrently producing, in the early 1990s, Jurassic Park and Schindler's List. Josh Singer was hired to re-write the screenplay ten weeks before filming.

As filming commenced, a number of New York Times figures who were associated with the Pentagon Papers case—among them James Greenfield, James Goodale, Allan M. Siegal, and Max Frankel—objected to the film's production due to the script's lack of emphasis on the Times' role in breaking the story. Goodale, who was at the time the Times's in-house counsel, later called the film "a good movie but bad history."

Spielberg used the real audio tapes of Nixon in the White House: no voice actor was used for the role, who appears only silhouetted.

=== Filming ===
The film began principal photography in New York on May 30, 2017. On June 6, 2017, it was announced that the project, retitled The Papers, would also star Alison Brie, Carrie Coon, David Cross, Bruce Greenwood, Tracy Letts, Bob Odenkirk, Sarah Paulson, Jesse Plemons, Matthew Rhys, Michael Stuhlbarg, Bradley Whitford, and Zach Woods. On August 25, 2017, the film's title reverted to The Post. Spielberg finished the final cut of the film on November 6, 2017, with the final sound mix also completed along with the musical score a week later, on November 13.

=== Costume design ===
Writing for The New York Times, Manohla Dargis indicated some high points in the costume design used in the film stating, "The costume designer Ann Roth subtly brightens Katharine, taking her from leaden gray to free-flowing gold."

== Soundtrack ==
When Steven first approached me about [The Post], we talked about Kay Graham and Ben Bradlee and what opportunities the film might present for me. When I've thought about it, I've never been in a newsroom – you know, with the clattering of a thousand typewriters in those days... Now no one's using them, it's all silent. But it must have been quite a noisy environment, really – everyone running back and forth. So I thought, "Well, how are you gonna get any music in a newsroom?"

— John Williams on composing the score

The score for the film was written by John Williams; it is his 28th collaboration with Spielberg. The music is a combination of traditional orchestral instrumentation and what Williams has called "very light, computerised electronic effects." Williams was originally attached to write the music for Spielberg's 2018 film Ready Player One, but, because both films had similar post-production schedules, Williams chose to work on The Post, while Alan Silvestri composed for Ready Player One. Spielberg has said that The Post was a rare instance in which he went to the recording sessions "having not heard a note" in advance.

Recording began on October 30, 2017, in Los Angeles. The soundtrack was released digitally by Sony Classical Records on December 22, 2017, and in physical form on January 12, 2018.

== Release ==
The Post premiered at the Newseum in Washington, D.C. on December 14, 2017. It began a limited theatrical release in the United States on December 22, 2017, and a wide release on January 12, 2018. The film is distributed internationally through Amblin Partners' distribution agreements with Universal Pictures, Reliance Entertainment, and Entertainment One. The film was released by Reliance in India. Tom Hanks said he would not be interested in appearing at a potential White House screening for President Donald Trump.

=== Marketing ===
The first official image from The Post was released on October 31, 2017. The trailer for The Post premiered exclusively on The Late Show with Stephen Colbert, on November 7, 2017, and the film's poster, designed by BLT Communications, was released the next day. The first TV spot, titled "Uncover the Truth", was released on November 21, 2017. Music for the trailer featured the Boston Typewriter Orchestra.

== Home media ==
The Post was released on Digital HD on April 3 and on Ultra HD Blu-ray, Blu-ray and DVD on April 17, 2018, by 20th Century Fox Home Entertainment in North America and in the United Kingdom and Australia via Entertainment One.

== Reception ==
=== Box office ===
The Post grossed $81.9 million in the United States and Canada, and $97.9 million in other territories, for a worldwide total of $179.8 million, against a production budget of $50 million.

During The Post's limited opening weekend, December 22 to 24, it grossed $526,011 (and a total of $762,057 over the four-day Christmas weekend) from nine theaters. The following weekend, the film grossed $561,080 for a per-theater average of $62,342, one of the highest of 2017. The film had its wide release alongside the openings of The Commuter, Paddington 2 and Proud Mary, and was projected to gross around $20 million from 2,819 theaters over the weekend. It made $5.9 million on its first day and $18.6 million over the weekend (and a four-day MLK weekend total of $23.4 million), finishing second at the box office behind holdover Jumanji: Welcome to the Jungle. 66% of its opening weekend audience was over the age of 35. It dropped 37% the following weekend to $12.2 million, finishing 4th behind Jumanji and newcomers 12 Strong and Den of Thieves. It dropped to 5th in its third week of wide release, grossing $8.9 million.

=== Critical response ===
On review aggregator Rotten Tomatoes, the film has an approval rating of 88% based on 409 reviews, with an average rating of 7.90/10. The website's critical consensus reads, "The Post's period setting belies its bitingly timely themes, brought compellingly to life by director Steven Spielberg and an outstanding ensemble cast." On Metacritic, the film has a weighted average score of 83 out of 100, based on 51 critics, indicating "universal acclaim". Audiences polled by CinemaScore gave the film an average grade of "A" on an A+ to F scale, while PostTrak reported 63% of audience members gave the film a "definite recommend".

Alonso Duralde of TheWrap praised the acting and Spielberg's direction, though he noted the script was too on-the-nose at times, saying, "The Post passes the trickiest tests of a historical drama: it makes us understand that decisions validated by the lens of history were difficult ones to make in the moment, and it generates suspense over how all the pieces fell into place to make those decisions come to fruition." David Ehrlich of IndieWire gave the film an A− and wrote: "Nobody needs to be reminded that history tends to go in circles, but The Post is so vital because it captures the ecstasy of trying to break the chain and bend things towards justice; defending the fundamental tenets of the Constitution hasn't been this much fun since Hamilton."

Chris Nashawaty, writing for Entertainment Weekly, gave the film a positive review, but also compared it with previous journalism films such as All the President's Men stating, "Spielberg makes these crucial days in American history easy to follow. But if you look at The Post next to something like All the President's Men, you see the difference between having a story passively explained to you and actively helping to untangle it. That's a small quibble with an urgent and impeccably acted film. But it's also the difference between a very good movie and a great one."

Manohla Dargis of The New York Times awarded the film an NYT Critic's Pick with a strong acknowledgment of Spielberg as director saying, "Mostly, (the Post decision to publish) went down fast, a pace that Mr. Spielberg conveys with accelerated rhythms, flying feet, racing cameras and an enjoyably loose approach to the material. With his virtuosic, veteran crew, Mr. Spielberg paints the scene vividly and with daubs of beauty; most notably, he creates distinct visual realms for the story's two main overlapping, at times colliding, worlds. Katharine reigns over one; at first she's all but entombed in her darkly lighted, wood-paneled empire. Ben rules the other, overseeing the talking and typing warriors of the glaring, noisily freewheeling newsroom".

Matt Bobkin, writing for Exclaim!, gave the film a 6 out of 10 score, saying the film "has all the makings of an awards season hit, but is too calculated to reflect today's ragged, tenuous sociopolitical climate."

Matt Zoller Seitz of RogerEbert.com reflected on the film nearly two years after its release, noting that due to the film's accessibility and Spielberg's invisible style of direction, critics underrated the film and tended to take its story literally such as by fact-checking historical details, in spite of the film being a "coded commentary" and doubling "as a stealth portrait of the media’s responsibility in the age of Trump, and in any age."

Bob Woodward, a Washington Post journalist who reported on the Watergate scandal, expressed that the film is a "masterpiece".

=== Portrayal of The New York Times ===
The film portrays the original role that The New York Times had in breaking the Pentagon Papers and then emphasizes The Washington Post's subsequent involvement. In an interview with the Columbia Journalism Review, former New York Times associates James Greenfield, who coordinated the Pentagon Papers project as the Times foreign editor; James Goodale, the Times' general counsel at the time; and Max Frankel, the Times' Washington bureau chief when the Papers were published, criticized the film's more minor portrayal of the paper, although The New York Times is shown as publishing the Pentagon Papers before The Washington Post and having also set the stage for the major legal battle between the press and the United States government. The newspaper also won the 1972 Pulitzer Prize for Public Service for its contributions.

The 1972 Pulitzer jury of journalists noted in their recommendation not only the significance of Daniel Ellsberg's Pentagon Papers leak, but also that of Times reporters Neil Sheehan, Hedrick Smith, Fox Butterfield and E. W. Kenworthy, and stated that their effort was "a combination of investigative reporting, analysis, research, and writing — all of which added to a distinctly meritorious public service, not only for readers of The Times but also for an entire nation." Goodale noted in an article for The Daily Beast that the Times published the Papers after Ellsberg had leaked them to Sheehan, and further stated that the film "creates a false impression that the Post was a major player in such publication. It's as though Hollywood had made a movie about the Times' triumphant role in Watergate." On PBS NewsHour, Goodale further said, "Although a producer has artistic license, I think it should be limited in a situation such as this, so that the public comes away with an understanding of what the true facts are in this case . . . And I think that if you're doing a movie now, when [President Donald] Trump is picking on the press for 'fake news', you want to be authentic. You don't want to be in any way fake."

== Accolades ==
Award	Date of ceremony	Category	Nominee(s)	Result	Ref.
AARP's Movies for Grownups Awards	February 5, 2018	Best Director	Steven Spielberg	Nominated	
AARP's Movies for Grownups Awards	February 5, 2018	Best Actor	Tom Hanks	Nominated	
AARP's Movies for Grownups Awards	February 5, 2018	Best Actress	Meryl Streep	Nominated	
AARP's Movies for Grownups Awards	February 5, 2018	Best Time Capsule	The Post	Nominated	
AARP's Movies for Grownups Awards	February 5, 2018	Readers' Choice Poll	The Post	Nominated	
Academy Awards	March 4, 2018	Best Picture	Amy Pascal, Steven Spielberg and Kristie Macosko Krieger	Nominated	
Academy Awards	March 4, 2018	Best Actress	Meryl Streep	Nominated	
Alliance of Women Film Journalists	January 9, 2018	Best Ensemble Cast – Casting Director	Ellen Lewis	Nominated	
Alliance of Women Film Journalists	January 9, 2018	Best Woman Screenwriter	Liz Hannah and Josh Singer	Nominated	
American Cinema Editors	January 26, 2018	Best Edited Feature Film – Dramatic	Michael Kahn and Sarah Broshar	Nominated	
American Film Institute	January 5, 2018	Top Ten Films of the Year	The Post	Won	
Art Directors Guild	January 27, 2018	Excellence in Production Design for a Period Film	Rick Carter	Nominated	
Casting Society of America	January 18, 2018	Big Budget – Drama	Rori Bergman, Karlee Fomalont, Ellen Lewis and Kate Sprance	Nominated	
The Cinema for Peace Award for the Most Valuable Film of the Year	February 15, 2018			Won	
Critics' Choice Movie Awards	January 11, 2018	Best Picture	The Post	Nominated	
Critics' Choice Movie Awards	January 11, 2018	Best Director	Steven Spielberg	Nominated	
Critics' Choice Movie Awards	January 11, 2018	Best Actor	Tom Hanks	Nominated	
Critics' Choice Movie Awards	January 11, 2018	Best Actress	Meryl Streep	Nominated	
Critics' Choice Movie Awards	January 11, 2018	Best Original Screenplay	Liz Hannah and Josh Singer	Nominated	
Critics' Choice Movie Awards	January 11, 2018	Best Acting Ensemble	The cast of The Post	Nominated	
Critics' Choice Movie Awards	January 11, 2018	Best Editing	Michael Kahn and Sarah Broshar	Nominated	
Critics' Choice Movie Awards	January 11, 2018	Best Score	John Williams	Nominated	
Dallas–Fort Worth Film Critics Association	December 13, 2017	Best Film	The Post	2nd Place	
Dallas–Fort Worth Film Critics Association	December 13, 2017	Best Director	Steven Spielberg	4th Place	
Dallas–Fort Worth Film Critics Association	December 13, 2017	Best Actor	Tom Hanks	5th Place	
Dallas–Fort Worth Film Critics Association	December 13, 2017	Best Actress	Meryl Streep	5th Place	
Detroit Film Critics Society	December 7, 2017	Best Ensemble	The cast of The Post	Won	
Detroit Film Critics Society	December 7, 2017	Best Screenplay	Liz Hannah and Josh Singer	Nominated	
Florida Film Critics Circle	December 23, 2017	Best Cinematography	Janusz Kamiński	Nominated	
Georgia Film Critics Association	January 12, 2018	Best Production Design	Rick Carter, Kim Jennings and Deborah Jensen	Nominated	
Georgia Film Critics Association	January 12, 2018	Best Original Score	John Williams	Nominated	
Georgia Film Critics Association	January 12, 2018	Best Ensemble	The cast of The Post	Nominated	
Golden Globe Awards	January 7, 2018	Best Motion Picture – Drama	The Post	Nominated	
Golden Globe Awards	January 7, 2018	Best Director	Steven Spielberg	Nominated	
Golden Globe Awards	January 7, 2018	Best Actor – Motion Picture Drama	Tom Hanks	Nominated	
Golden Globe Awards	January 7, 2018	Best Actress – Motion Picture Drama	Meryl Streep	Nominated	
Golden Globe Awards	January 7, 2018	Best Screenplay	Liz Hannah and Josh Singer	Nominated	
Golden Globe Awards	January 7, 2018	Best Original Score	John Williams	Nominated	
Houston Film Critics Society	January 6, 2018	Best Picture	The Post	Nominated	
Houston Film Critics Society	January 6, 2018	Best Director	Steven Spielberg	Nominated	
Houston Film Critics Society	January 6, 2018	Best Original Screenplay	Liz Hannah and Josh Singer	Nominated	
Houston Film Critics Society	January 6, 2018	Best Score	John Williams	Nominated	
Humanitas Prize	February 16, 2018	Feature – Drama	Liz Hannah and Josh Singer	Nominated	
IndieWire Critics Poll	December 19, 2017	Best Picture	The Post	10th Place	
National Board of Review	January 4, 2018	Best Film	The Post	Won	
National Board of Review	January 4, 2018	Best Actor	Tom Hanks	Won	
National Board of Review	January 4, 2018	Best Actress	Meryl Streep	Won	
National Society of Film Critics	January 6, 2018	Best Supporting Actor	Michael Stuhlbarg	2nd Place (Note: Also nominated for Call Me by Your Name and The Shape of Water)	
New York Film Critics Online	December 10, 2017	Top 10 Films	The Post	Won	
Online Film Critics Society	December 28, 2017	Best Ensemble	The cast of The Post	Nominated	
Producers Guild of America Awards	January 20, 2018	Best Theatrical Motion Picture	Amy Pascal, Steven Spielberg and Kristie Macosko Krieger	Nominated	
San Diego Film Critics Society	December 11, 2017	Best Editing	Michael Kahn and Sarah Broshar	Nominated	
San Diego Film Critics Society	December 11, 2017	Best Ensemble	The cast of The Post	Nominated	
San Francisco Film Critics Circle	December 10, 2017	Best Editing	Michael Kahn	Nominated	
Saturn Awards	June 27, 2018	Best Thriller Film	The Post	Nominated	
Seattle Film Critics Society	December 18, 2017	Best Picture of the Year	The Post	Nominated	
Seattle Film Critics Society	December 18, 2017	Best Actress	Meryl Streep	Nominated	
Seattle Film Critics Society	December 18, 2017	Best Ensemble	The cast of The Post	Nominated	
St. Louis Film Critics Association	December 17, 2017	Best Film	The Post	Nominated	
St. Louis Film Critics Association	December 17, 2017	Best Director	Steven Spielberg	Runner-up	
St. Louis Film Critics Association	December 17, 2017	Best Actor	Tom Hanks	Nominated	
St. Louis Film Critics Association	December 17, 2017	Best Actress	Meryl Streep	Nominated	
St. Louis Film Critics Association	December 17, 2017	Best Editing	Michael Kahn and Sarah Broshar	Nominated	
St. Louis Film Critics Association	December 17, 2017	Best Original Score	John Williams	Nominated	
Washington D.C. Area Film Critics Association	December 8, 2017	Best Actress	Meryl Streep	Nominated	
Washington D.C. Area Film Critics Association	December 8, 2017	Best Ensemble	The cast of The Post	Nominated	
Washington D.C. Area Film Critics Association	December 8, 2017	Best Portrayal of Washington D.C.	The Post	Won	
Women Film Critics Circle	December 17, 2017	Karen Morley Award	The Post	Nominated	
Writers Guild of America Awards	February 11, 2018	Paul Selvin Award	Liz Hannah and Josh Singer	Won	

== See also ==
- All the President's Men: 1976 Best Picture nominee about the Post's later efforts to break the Watergate scandal, with Ben Bradlee also portrayed, and which opens at the same moment in which The Post closes - Frank Wills' discovery of the Watergate break-in.
- The Most Dangerous Man in America (2009 Oscar-nominated documentary)
- The Pentagon Papers (2003 film)
- Mark Felt: The Man Who Brought Down the White House (2017 film)
