= Alessandra Querzola =

Italian set decorator

- Occupation: Set decorator
- Years active: 1995-present

Alessandra Querzola is an Italian set decorator born in Trieste. She is best known for her work on the 2017 film Blade Runner 2049 for which she was nominated for the Academy Award for Best Production Design.

== Filmography ==
- 2017: Blade Runner 2049
- 2016: The Man from U.N.C.L.E. (set decorator: Italy)
- 2015: Avengers: Age of Ultron (location set decorator)
- 2015: Blackhat (assistant set decorator)
- 2014: Pompeii (set decorator: prep)
- 2012: Skyfall (assistant set decorator)
- 2010: The Tourist (assistant set decorator)
- 2009: Nine (assistant set decorator: Italy)
- 2008: Quantum of Solace (assistant set decorator)
- 2007: Charlie Wilson's War (set decorator: Morocco)
- 2005: Casanova (set dresser)
- 2005: Dominion: Prequel to the Exorcist (set decorator: Italy)
- 2004: The Life Aquatic with Steve Zissou (lead person)
- 2004: Envy (set decorator: Italy)
- 2003: The Order (assistant set decorator) / (lead set dresser)
- 2002: Gangs of New York (property coordinator)
- 2000: The Luzhin Defence (set dresser: Italy)
- 1999: The Children of the Century (set decorator: Italy)
- 1999: A Midsummer Night's Dream (assistant set decorator) / (lead set dresser)
- 1998: Dangerous Beauty (assistant set decorator) / (lead set dresser)
- 1997: Nel profondo paese straniero (assistant production designer)
- 1996: The English Patient (assistant set decorator)
- 1994: Only You (set decorator: Italy)
- 1992: The Timekeeper (Short) (set decorator/props coordinator: Italy)
- 1992: Inspector Morse (TV Series) (set decorator assistant - 1 episode)
- 1988: Provvisorio quasi d'amore (Short) (assistant art director)
