= Jane (2017 film) =

2017 American documentary about Jane Goodall

- Theatrical release poster
- Directed by: Brett Morgen
- Written by: Brett Morgen
- Produced by: Brett Morgen; Bryan Burk; Tony Gerber; James Smith
- Starring: Jane Goodall
- Cinematography: Ellen Kuras
- Edited by: Joe Beshenkovsky
- Music by: Philip Glass
- Production companies: National Geographic Studios; Public Road Productions
- Distributed by: National Geographic Documentary Films; Fox Searchlight Pictures (uncredited); Abramorama
- Release dates: September 10, 2017 (TIFF); October 20, 2017 (United States)
- Running time: 90 minutes
- Country: United States
- Language: English
- Box office: $1.8 million

Jane is a 2017 American biographical documentary film directed and written by Brett Morgen about primatologist, ethologist, and anthropologist Jane Goodall.

During the 2017 Toronto International Film Festival, the film's world premiere was at the Winter Garden Theatre on September 10, 2017.

== Synopsis ==
In 1957, Jane Goodall is assigned by paleoanthropologist Louis Leakey to observe chimpanzees in the jungles of Tanzania (the site of the future Gombe Stream National Park). She is an untrained 26-year-old, but grew up with a love of animals and the outdoors. She conducts her research while living at a camp with her mother, Vanne, as a chaperone.

After five months of observing a chimp community, Jane reports to Leakey that she has observed chimpanzees modifying objects to make effective tools. This discovery is met with pushback from the scientific community and misogynistic headlines in the press. Yet, she is given a new grant from the National Geographic Society. Documentary filmmaker Hugo van Lawick is sent to record Jane's research in color 16 mm film. Their work relationship soon becomes romantic. After Hugo’s assignment at Gombe concludes, he asks Jane to marry him and she accepts.

Jane offers food to the chimps in an effort to lessen their fear of her, so she can observe them more closely. This results in the animals' becoming aggressive and destructive at her campsite. She sets up a feeding station to deescalate the situation. The dominant female of the chimpanzee troop, Flo, gives birth to a son, Flint. This is the first time a mother-infant chimpanzee relationship is observed from birth in the wild.

Jane and Hugo tour Europe and the United States, presenting their work and raising money. Jane becomes the “National Geographic cover girl." A research center is built in Gombe and brings in students to collect more data on the chimpanzees.

Hugo and Jane work together on the Serengeti; Hugo makes films about the wildlife, while Jane writes books, observes various animal species, and manages the Gombe research from afar. They have a son, nicknamed "Grub.” Jane initially plans to study his development in comparison to chimpanzee infants, but gives up the project when she realizes that she simply “wants to be there in the moment.”

Jane returns to Gombe with Grub. She attempts to home school her son, but he is eventually sent back to England to live with his grandmother. A polio outbreak ravages the chimpanzee troop. The eldest male is euthanized due to severe paralysis, and the rest of the troop are vaccinated. After the outbreak, the researchers are no longer allowed to touch the chimpanzees. Later on, Flo dies suddenly and the fallout in the troop is significant. The adolescent Flint starves to death, caused by depression over the loss of his mother. The chimp community splits their territory, creating a northern group and a southern group. Eventually the northern chimpanzees eradicate the southern ones. Jane is shocked by the brutality, and comes to believe that the human practice of war originates from genetics.

Jane and Hugo divorce, as they are often separated due to their work. Jane considers the truly unique trait of humankind to be sophisticated language, and how it gives us the ability to teach younger generations about past successes and failures. Beginning in October 1986, Jane travels extensively to raise awareness about chimpanzees and wildlife conservation. After completing school, Grub moves to Dar es Salaam, Tanzania and becomes a master boat builder. Hugo makes films on the Serengeti, to great acclaim, until his death in 2002.

== Production ==
It makes use of footage filmed by Hugo van Lawick that was rediscovered in 2014.

== Reception ==
=== Critical reception ===
On review aggregator website Rotten Tomatoes, the film holds an approval rating of 98% based on 93 reviews, and an average rating of 8.4/10. The website's critical consensus reads, "Jane honors its subject's legacy with an absorbing, beautifully filmed, and overall enlightening look at her decades of invaluable work." On Metacritic, the film has a weighted average score of 87 out of 100, based on 24 critics, indicating "universal acclaim".

=== Awards and nominations ===
Year	Award/Festival	Category	Nominee(s)	Result
2017	25th Hamptons International Film Festival	Zelda Penzel “Giving Voice to the Voiceless” Award	Brett Morgen	Nominated
2017	61st BFI London Film Festival	The Grierson Award for Best Documentary	Brett Morgen	Nominated
2017	26th Philadelphia Film Festival	Student Choice Award	Brett Morgen	Won
2017	2nd Critics' Choice Documentary Awards	Best Documentary	Brett Morgen	Won
2017	8th Hollywood Music in Media Awards	Original Score – Documentary	Philip Glass	Won
2017	31st Leeds International Film Festival	Audience Award – Cinema Versa	Brett Morgen	Won
2017	89th National Board of Review Awards	Best Documentary Film		Won
2017	43rd Los Angeles Film Critics Association Awards	Best Documentary Film		Nominated
2017	30th International Documentary Film Festival Amsterdam	IDFA Audience Award		Nominated
2017	16th Washington D.C. Area Film Critics Association Awards	Best Documentary		Won
2018	11th Cinema Eye Honors	Cinema Eye Audience Choice Prize		Won
2018	11th Cinema Eye Honors	Outstanding Achievement in Editing	Joe Beshenkovsky	Nominated
2018	11th Cinema Eye Honors	Outstanding Achievement in Original Music Score	Philip Glass	Won
2018	11th Cinema Eye Honors	The Unforgettables	Jane Goodall	Won
2018	29th Producers Guild of America Awards	Outstanding Producer of Documentary Theatrical Motion Pictures	Brett Morgen, Bryan Burk, Tony Gerber, James Smith	Won
2018	70th Primetime Creative Arts Emmy Awards	Outstanding Cinematography for a Nonfiction Program	Ellen Kuras, Hugo van Lawick (posthumously for pre-existing photography)	Won
2018	70th Primetime Creative Arts Emmy Awards	Outstanding Directing for a Documentary/Nonfiction Program	Brett Morgen	Won
2018	70th Primetime Creative Arts Emmy Awards	Outstanding Sound Editing for Nonfiction Programming	Warren Shaw, Joshua Paul Johnson, Odin Benitez, Peter Staubli, Will Digby, Suzana Peric, Tara Blume	Nominated
2018	70th Primetime Creative Arts Emmy Awards	Outstanding Sound Mixing for a Nonfiction Program	David E. Fluhr, Marc Fishman, Lee Smith, Derek Lee	Nominated
2018	70th Primetime Creative Arts Emmy Awards	Outstanding Picture Editing For A Nonfiction Program	Joe Beshenkovsky, Brett Morgen, Editor Will Znidaric, Editor	Nominated
2018	70th Primetime Creative Arts Emmy Awards	Exceptional Merit In Documentary Filmmaking	Brett Morgen, Bryan Burk, James Smith, Tim Pastore	Nominated
2018	70th Primetime Creative Arts Emmy Awards	Outstanding Writing for Nonfiction Programming	Brett Morgen	Nominated
2018	Cinema for Peace awards	The International Green Film Award	Brett Morgen	Won
