= The Beatles – A Four-Film Cinematic Event =

Upcoming four biopics about the Beatles

- Created by: Sam Mendes
- Owners: Sony Pictures Entertainment; Apple Corps; Neal Street Productions

Films and television
- Films: John Lennon film (2028); Paul McCartney film (2028); George Harrison film (2028); Ringo Starr film (2028)

Miscellaneous
- Produced by: Sam Mendes; Pippa Harris; Julie Pastor; Alexandra Derbyshire
- Directed by: Sam Mendes
- Written by: Jez Butterworth; Peter Straughan; Jack Thorne
- Starring: Harris Dickinson; Paul Mescal; Joseph Quinn; Barry Keoghan

Official website
- The Beatles on Neal Street Productions

The Beatles – A Four-Film Cinematic Event is an upcoming series of four biographical films based on the lives and career of the Beatles. Each film is being directed by Sam Mendes and written by Jez Butterworth, Peter Straughan and Jack Thorne. Produced by Columbia Pictures in association with Neal Street Productions, and Apple Corps, all four films are to be released throughout April 2028. Each one of the "stand alone, individual stories" is set to be told from the perspective of one band member: John Lennon, Paul McCartney, George Harrison, and Ringo Starr, who will be played by Harris Dickinson, Paul Mescal, Joseph Quinn, and Barry Keoghan, respectively.

Mendes had conceived the idea of films about the Beatles in 2022. Beginning in late 2023, he discussed the plans with Sony Pictures, and convinced each of the band members and the estates. By February 2024, Sony Pictures and Neal Street Productions finished a deal to produce four distinct films. By March 2025, Dickinson, Mescal, Quinn, and Keoghan were confirmed to play the main roles. Production had begun by November 2025, with further casting announced in February 2026.

== Cast ==
- Harris Dickinson as John Lennon
- Paul Mescal as Paul McCartney
- Joseph Quinn as George Harrison
- Barry Keoghan as Ringo Starr
- Saoirse Ronan as Linda McCartney
- Mia McKenna-Bruce as Maureen Starkey
- Anna Sawai as Yoko Ono
- Aimee Lou Wood as Pattie Boyd
- James Norton as Brian Epstein
- Harry Lloyd as George Martin
- David Morrissey as Jim McCartney
- Leanne Best as Mimi Smith
- Bobby Schofield as Neil Aspinall
- Daniel Hoffmann-Gill as Mal Evans
- Arthur Darvill as Derek Taylor
- Adam Pally as Allen Klein
- Lucy Boynton as Jane Asher
- Farhan Akhtar as Ravi Shankar
- Morfydd Clark as Cynthia Lennon
- Harry Lawtey as Stuart Sutcliffe
- Ben Schwartz as Murray the K
- Adrian Scarborough as Allan Williams
- Adam Lawrence as Pete Best

== Production ==
=== Development ===
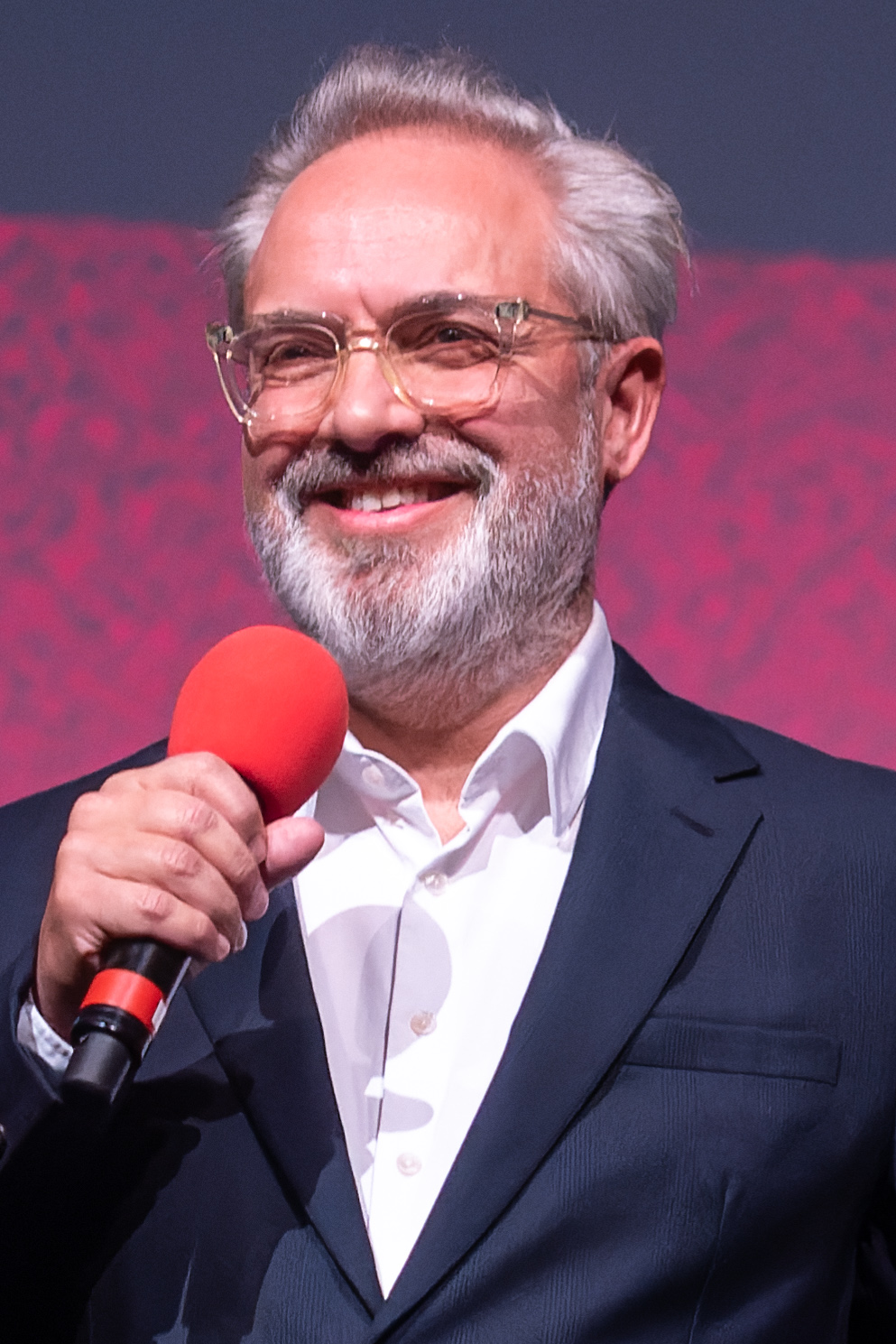
Mendes in 2022, at the London premiere of Empire of Light

By late 2023, director Sam Mendes began discussing plans to make films regarding the English rock band, the Beatles, with Sony Pictures Entertainment (SPE). He had met with SPE's Tom Rothman and Elizabeth Gabler, and stated that he had chosen SPE due to "Tom and Elizabeth's passion for the idea and commitment to propelling these films theatrically in an innovative and exciting way." Mendes had conceived of the idea in 2022 and convinced the estates of each of the band members. By February 2024, SPE and Mendes's production company Neal Street Productions finished a deal to produce four distinct films, one for each band member: John Lennon, Paul McCartney, George Harrison, and Ringo Starr. Mendes was set to direct each film alongside Neal Street Productions partner Pippa Harris and Julie Pastor, while Jeff Jones will executive produce for Apple Corps Limited. The estates and families of each band member also granted full life story and musical rights for the films, while Mendes was granted creative freedom.

In March 2025, at an industry convention CinemaCon in Las Vegas, Rothman described the quadruple premiere as "the first bingeable theatrical experience." The official tagline for the films is: "Each man has his own story, but together they are legendary."

=== Writing ===
In May 2025, it was announced that Jez Butterworth, Peter Straughan, and Jack Thorne would co-write the screenplays for all four movies. Starr and Mendes discussed the films for two days. There, Starr read the entire script for his film and offered Mendes extensive feedback, especially with scenes involving him, his family, and his first wife Maureen Starkey.

=== Casting ===
Main cast of the series

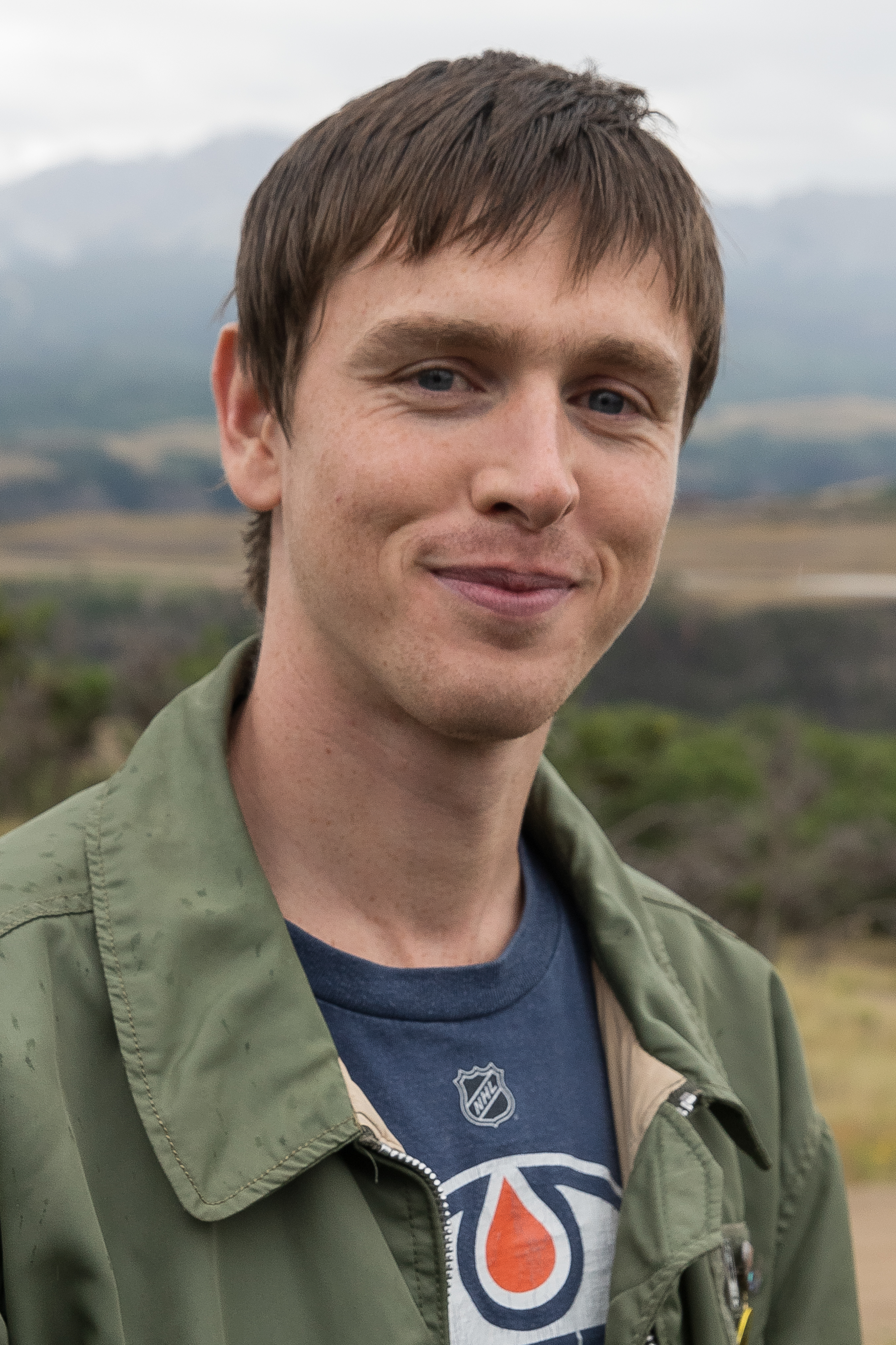
Harris Dickinson (John Lennon)

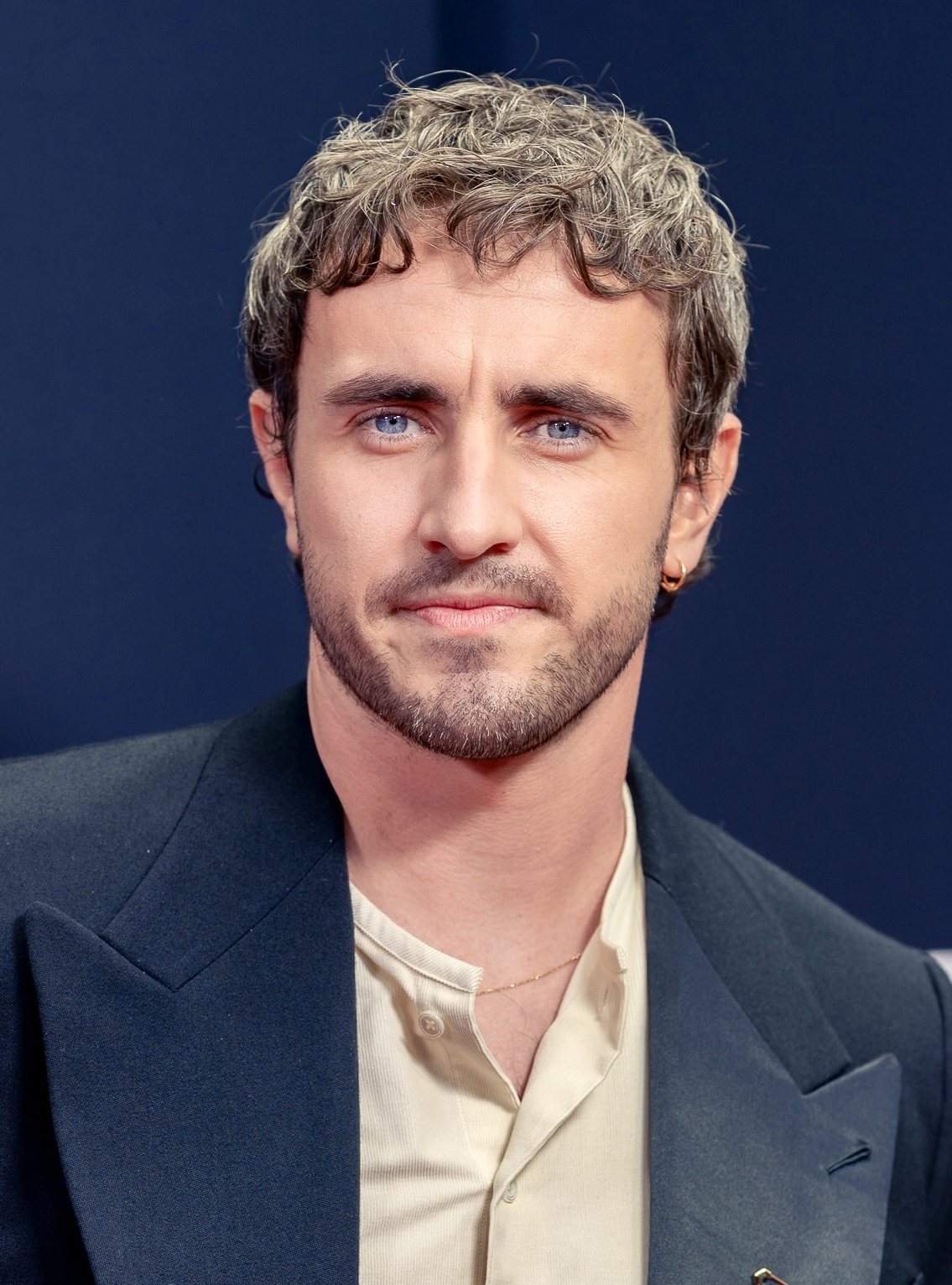
Paul Mescal (Paul McCartney)

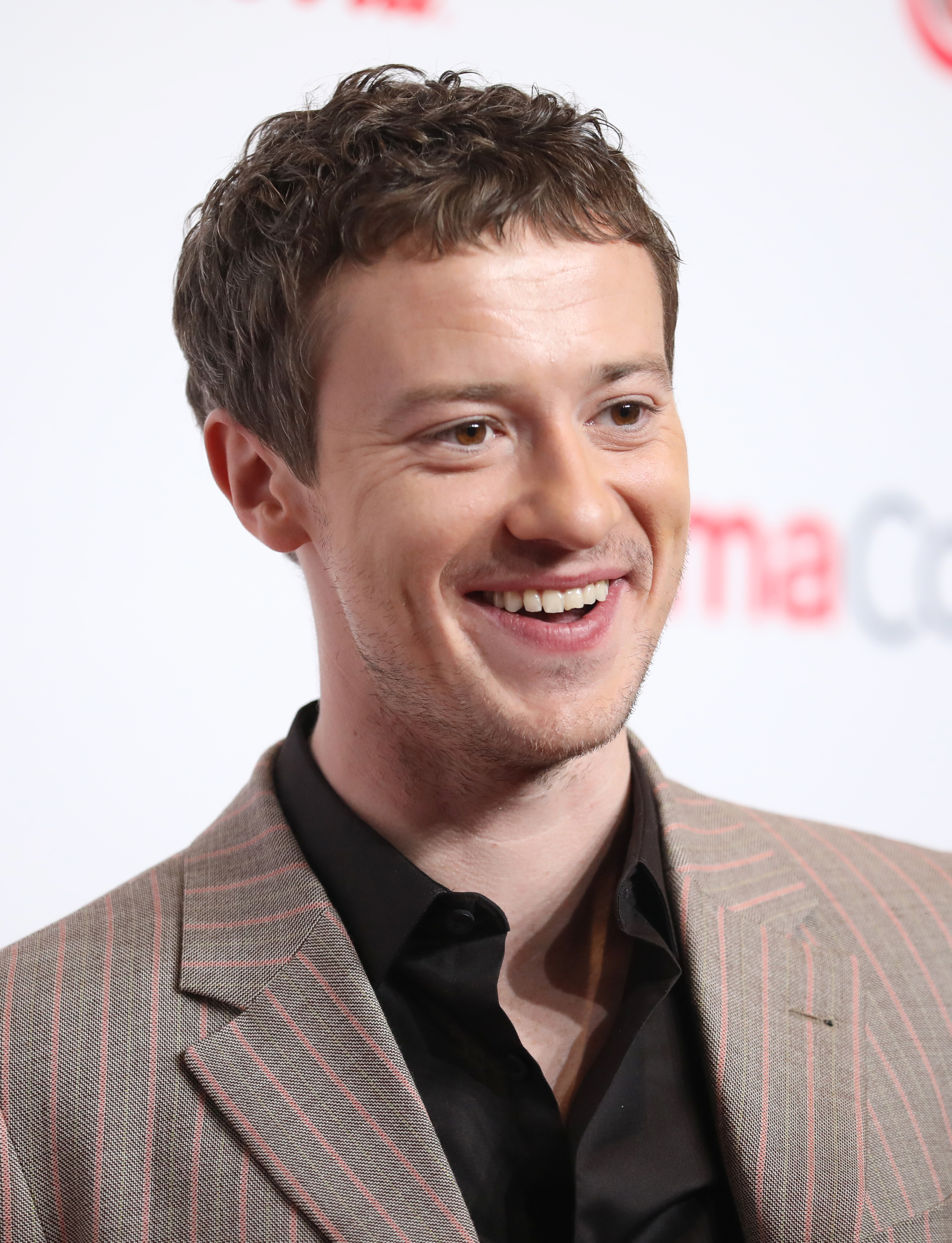
Joseph Quinn (George Harrison)

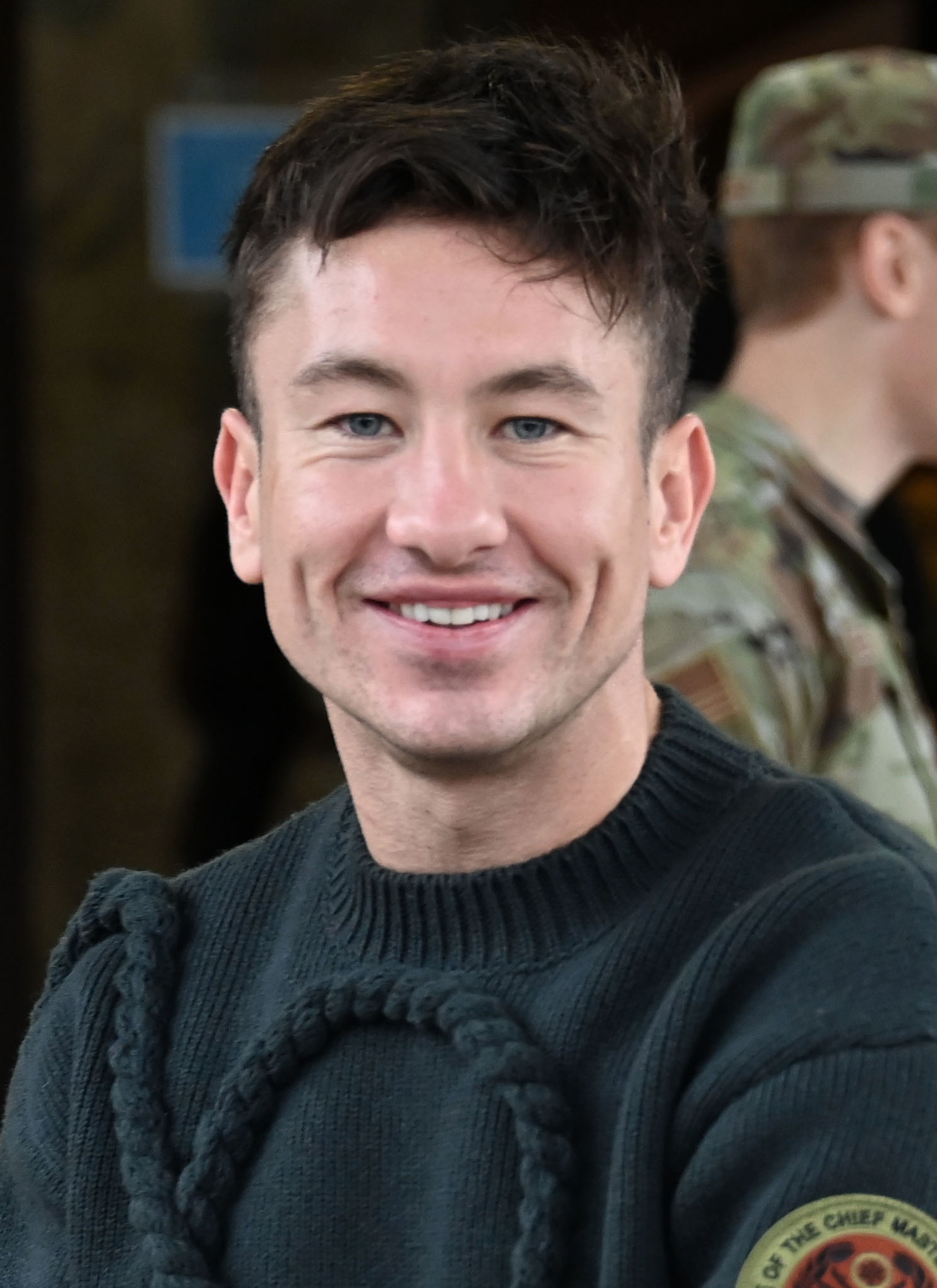
Barry Keoghan (Ringo Starr)

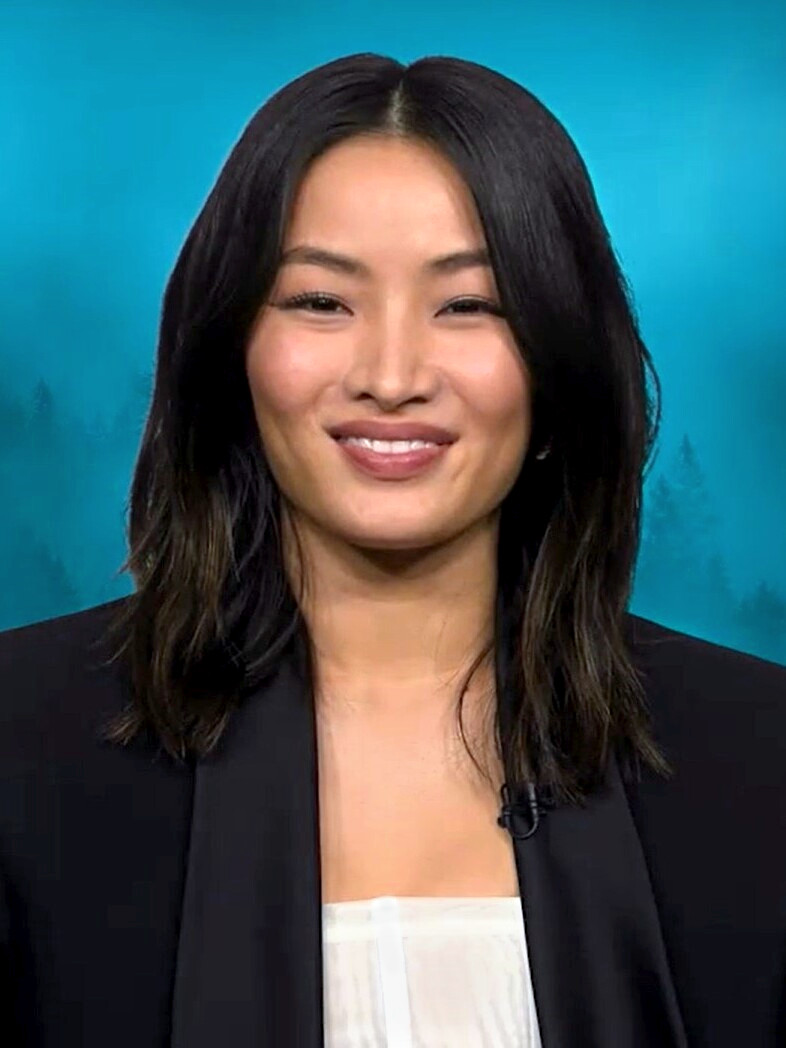
Anna Sawai (Yoko Ono)

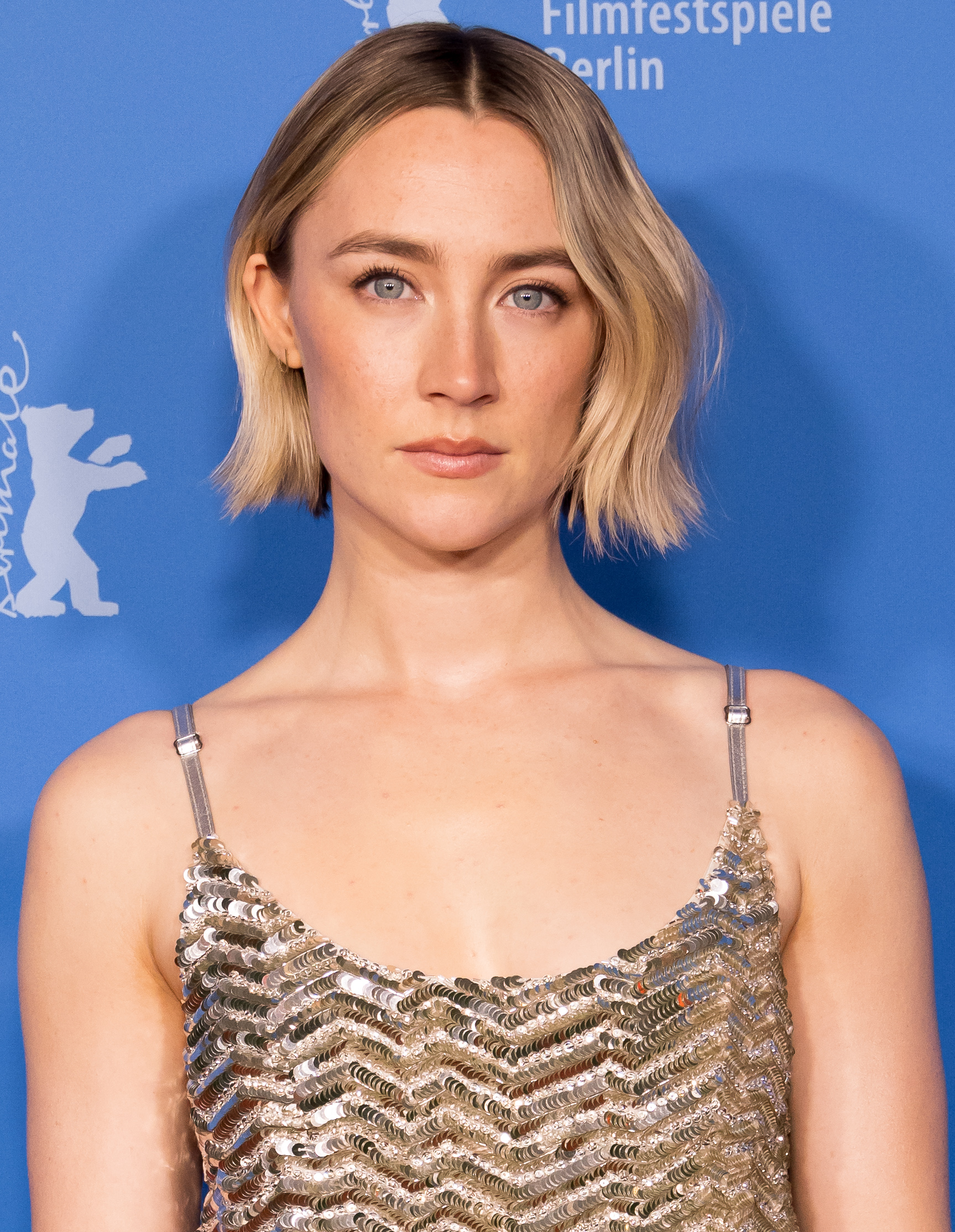
Saoirse Ronan (Linda McCartney)

Aimee Lou Wood (Pattie Boyd)

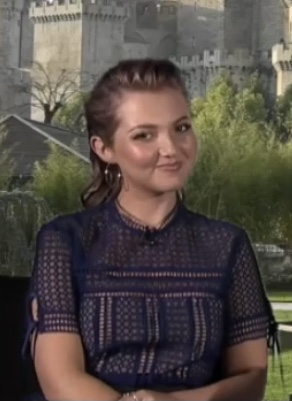
Mia McKenna-Bruce (Maureen Starkey)

The actors playing the title roles, along with their respective partners

In June 2024, Harris Dickinson, Paul Mescal, Barry Keoghan, and Charlie Rowe were in contention to play the members. Keoghan as Starr was confirmed in November 2024. Mescal was confirmed as McCartney in December, with Joseph Quinn reportedly chosen to play Harrison. Asa Butterfield and Finn Wolfhard also auditioned for the role of Harrison. Anna Sawai was rumoured to have been cast as Yoko Ono, but Sawai disputed this in February 2025. At CinemaCon in March 2025, Dickinson as Lennon and Quinn as Harrison were confirmed, with the pair appearing on stage alongside Mendes, Mescal as McCartney, and Keoghan as Starr.

In October 2025, it was announced that Saoirse Ronan would play Linda McCartney, while Mia McKenna-Bruce was cast as Maureen Starkey. Additionally, Sawai was officially confirmed as being in discussions for the role of Ono, with Aimee Lou Wood in negotiations to play Pattie Boyd. Meanwhile, James Norton was cast as Brian Epstein. The castings of McKenna-Bruce, Ronan, Sawai and Wood were officially confirmed at the end of October. In November 2025, Harry Lloyd joined the cast. In December, David Morrissey, Leanne Best, Bobby Schofield, Daniel Hoffman-Gill, Arthur Darvill and Adam Pally were added to the cast. Lucy Boynton, Farhan Akhtar, Morfydd Clark, and Harry Lawtey were cast in February 2026. In June 2026, Ben Schwartz joined the cast.

In preparation for her role as Yoko Ono, Anna Sawai has been consuming media related to and produced by the artist. She hoped that the films will help clear up public misconceptions and share Yoko’s perspective. Sawai enthused about Dickinson, Mescal, Quinn, and Keoghan's “surreal” musical harmony during their rehearsals.

=== Filming ===
Production was set to begin by mid-2025, with the intention of shooting all the films back-to-back. In March 2025, Mendes said that it would take him more than a year to shoot all four movies.

Filming had begun by November 2025. It was reported that the production was not granted permission to film at the Abbey Road location over concerns regarding closing the road. Starr also visited the film set. In January 2026, Mescal stated production was still "a while away from finishing" and that he would be doing his own singing in the film, with filming to be "my job for all of 2026". Scenes recreating the band arriving in New York City for The Ed Sullivan Show were filmed in London in February. Mescal and Keoghan also filmed scenes in Liverpool that March. Between May and June filming with Dickinson, Mescal, Quinn and Keoghan occurred in Barcelona and Salou, Spain. Mescal and Keoghan were also spotted filming scenes on a yacht recreating a 1964 vacation taken by McCartney and Starr that month.

In August 2026, filming occurred at Abbey Road for a scene featuring over 80 extras and vintage vehicles. On August 16, 2026, Dickinson, Mescal, Quinn, and Keoghan were filmed recreating the iconic cover of the Beatles' 1969 album Abbey Road at the zebra crossing outside Abbey Road Studios. In September 2026, the cast was spotted recreating the opening scene from A Hard Day's Night. On September 30, filming took place in Bangor, North Wales, recreating the band's 1967 visit to Bangor. On October 5, filming took place with Mescal and Dickinson around the former Liverpool College of Art, recreating the time when John Lennon was studying at the art school. A few days later, filming with Mescal and Dickinson took place at Mendips on Menlove Avenue in Liverpool, outside of John Lennon's childhood home. On November 8, filming took place at Camber Sands, recreating the band's 1963 beach photo shoot for the Reveille newspaper.

The crew for the films consists of cinematographer Greig Fraser, editor Lee Smith, production designers Stefania Cella, Mark Tildesley and Neal Callow, and costume designer Sinéad Kidao.

== Marketing ==
In January 2026, Sony Pictures released first images of each main actor in character, on postcards distributed at the Liverpool Institute for Performing Arts, as well as other iconic Beatles locations including Lennon's childhood home; The Beatles Statue, and The Cavern Club in Liverpool; the Kaiserkeller, and the Star-Club in Hamburg; Strawberry Fields in Central Park; and at various record stores, shops, cafes and bars in Tokyo. The following day, Sony Pictures released the same pictures digitally. On 19 August 2026, Apple Corps and Universal Music Group (UMG) announced a new long-term global partnership covering the Beatles' physical and digital merchandising, licensing and e-commerce. The agreement was announced ahead of the planned 2027 opening of The Beatles at 3 Savile Row fan experience and the 2028 release of the four films.

For 2028, Apple Corps are relocating and expanding The Beatles Story museum in Liverpool, that will incorporate sets and props from Mendes' films, amongst original artefacts and reconstructed sets to trace the band's history. As the plans were announced in October 2026, Mendes said that filming the Beatles films in Liverpool had "brought home just how extraordinary the band's legacy in the city is", adding that the experience would help support emerging talent.

== Release ==
The films, an untitled John Lennon film, an untitled Paul McCartney film, an untitled George Harrison film, and an untitled Ringo Starr film, were initially expected to be released in 2027, but were later confirmed to be scheduled for simultaneous release on 7 April 2028, described as the "first bingeable theatrical experience."

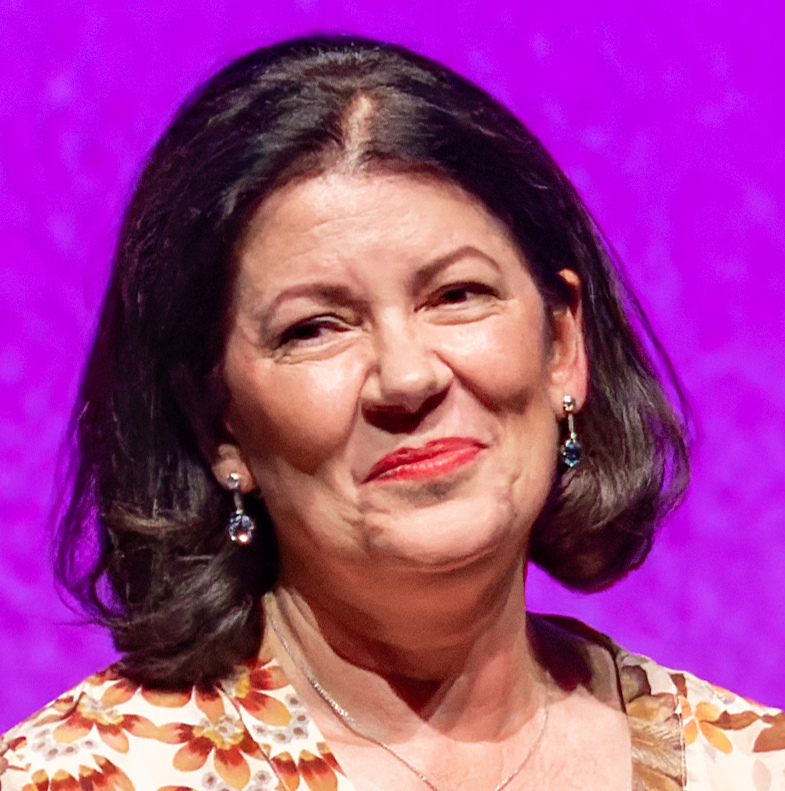
Harris at the London Film Festival in 2022

In July 2026, Sony Pictures chairman Tom Rothman cited that the four films have the potential to be a "big theatrical bet" as the box office is "roaring" while he feels that the audience want diverse, new programming after how the COVID-19 pandemic and the 2023 Hollywood labour disputes negatively affected movie business, so he hopes that people can remember what fun is with something that feels special now that everyone wants to make everything into an event, just like the Beatles who are international and may get the audience to not stay at home in "another Friday night".

In October 2026, at the BFI London Film Festival, producer Harris said all four films are slated to release "in April 2028," and that they "stand alone as individual stories of each of those four men, but they have a cumulative power."

=== Comments on simultaneous premieres ===
Industry critics analysed Sony's planned simultaneous release of all four Beatles biopics. In February 2026, Screen Rant noted the challenge of convincing audiences to buy four tickets in one go, especially since the film focused on Starr may draw less interest than those about Lennon or McCartney, potentially feeling like mandatory homework. The website also highlighted easier, cheaper unified marketing, a lower overall break-even point if just one or two of the films succeed, quadrupled chances for word-of-mouth hits, and the excitement of an unprecedented experiment.

In October 2026, The Hollywood Reporter reported that despite the previous announcement that all four films would be released simultaneously, Sony and the filmmakers had yet to finalise a release strategy due to concerns about differing box office performance between all four films, and were considering not reporting the individual box office returns for all four films, or getting theatres to offer a four-ticket bundle in an attempt to make sure that not one film was seen as doing better than the others.

== See also ==
- Outline of the Beatles
- The Beatles timeline
- The Beatles in popular culture
- Hamburg Days – upcoming British television drama series about the Beatles' early career
