= List of awards and nominations received by Paul Mescal =

Paul Mescal awards and nominations
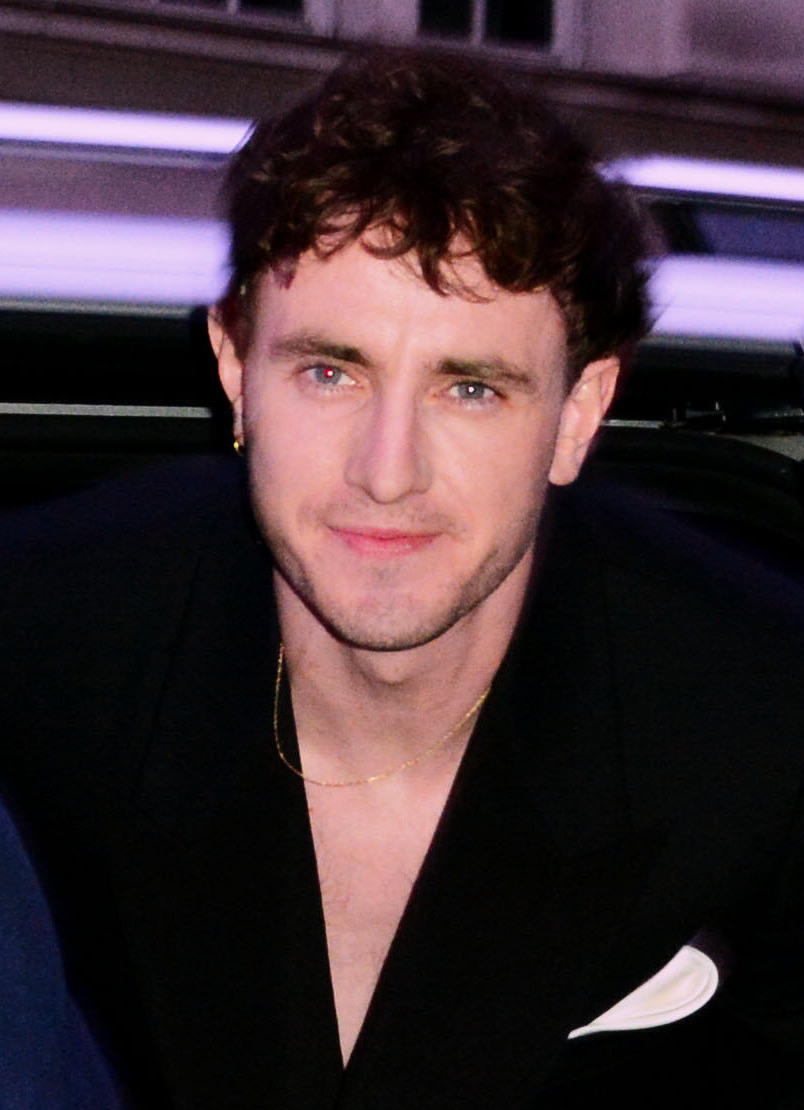
- Mescal at the London Film Critics Circle Awards 2023
Awards and nominations
Award	Wins	Nominations
Academy Awards	0	1
Actor Awards	0	2
BAFTA Awards	2	5
Critics' Choice Awards	0	3
Emmy Awards	0	1
European Film Awards	0	1
Golden Globe Awards	0	1
Laurence Olivier Awards	1	1

Totals (Note: Certain award groups do not simply award one winner. They acknowledge several different recipients, have runners-up, and have third place. Since this is a specific recognition and is different from losing an award, runner-up mentions are considered wins in this award tally. For simplification and to avoid errors, each award in this list has been presumed to have had a prior nomination.)
- Wins: 18
- Nominations: 100

Paul Mescal is an Irish actor known for his roles on stage and screen. His accolades include two BAFTA Awards and a Laurence Olivier Award as well as nominations for an Academy Award, a Primetime Emmy Award, and two Critics' Choice Awards.

He first gained recognition for his breakout starring role as Connell Waldron, a complex romantic lead struggling with identity, romance, and mental health issues in the BBC / Hulu romantic drama miniseries Normal People (2020). The series was an adaptation of the Sally Rooney 2018 novel of the same name. He earned acclaim for his performance as well as the British Academy Television Award for Best Actor along with nominations for the Primetime Emmy Award for Outstanding Lead Actor in a Limited Series or Movie and the Critics' Choice Movie Award for Best Actor.

On film, he portrayed an emotionally unavailable father in the Charlotte Wells directed independent drama film Aftersun (2022) earned him many nominations, including for the Academy Award for Best Actor, BAFTA Award for Best Actor in a Leading Role, and Critics' Choice Movie Award for Best Actor. He received the Academy Museum of Motion Pictures Vantage Award for his contribution to film. That following year he was nominated for BAFTA Award for Best Actor in a Supporting Role for playing a mysterious neighbor in the psychological drama All of Us Strangers (2024).

Mescal has also received the Laurence Olivier Award for Best Actor for his portrayal of Stanley Kowalski in the 2022 West End revival of the play A Streetcar Named Desire. He reprised his role Off-Broadway in New York City earning acclaim as well as a Theater World Award and nominations a Drama League Award, and a Dorian Award for his performance.

== Major associations ==
=== Academy Awards ===
Year	Category	Nominated work	Result	Ref.
2023	Best Actor	Aftersun	Nominated	

=== Actor Awards ===
Year	Category	Nominated work	Result	Ref.
2026	Outstanding Cast in a Motion Picture	Hamnet	Nominated	
2026	Outstanding Male Actor in a Supporting Role	Hamnet	Nominated	

=== BAFTA Awards ===
Year	Category	Nominated work	Result	Ref.
British Academy Film Awards
2023	Best Actor in a Leading Role	Aftersun	Nominated	
2024	Best Actor in a Supporting Role	All of Us Strangers	Nominated	
2026	Best Actor in a Supporting Role	Hamnet	Nominated	
British Academy Television Awards
2021	Best Actor	Normal People	Won	
British Academy Scotland Awards
2023	Best Actor Film	Aftersun	Won	

=== Critics' Choice Awards ===
Year	Category	Nominated work	Result	Ref.
Critics' Choice Movie Awards
2023	Best Actor	Aftersun	Nominated	
2026	Best Supporting Actor	Hamnet	Nominated	
Critics' Choice Television Awards
2021	Best Actor in a Movie/Miniseries	Normal People	Nominated	

=== Emmy Awards ===
Year	Category	Nominated work	Result	Ref.
Primetime Emmy Awards
2020	Outstanding Lead Actor in a Limited Series or Movie	Normal People	Nominated	

=== European Film Awards ===
Year	Category	Nominated work	Result	Ref.
2022	European Actor	Aftersun	Nominated	

=== Golden Globe Awards ===
Year	Category	Nominated work	Result	Ref.
2026	Best Supporting Actor – Motion Picture	Hamnet	Nominated	

=== Laurence Olivier Awards ===
Year	Category	Nominated work	Result	Ref.
2023	Best Actor	A Streetcar Named Desire	Won	

== Miscellaneous accolades ==
Organizations	Year	Category	Work	Result	Ref.
Academy Museum of Motion Pictures	2024	Vantage Award	—N/a	Honored	
AACTA International Awards	2021	Best Actor in a Series	Normal People	Nominated	
AACTA International Awards	2026	Best Supporting Actor	Hamnet	Nominated	
British Independent Film Awards	2022	Best Supporting Performance	God's Creatures	Nominated	
British Independent Film Awards	2022	Best Joint Lead Performance	Aftersun	Nominated	
British Independent Film Awards	2023	Best Supporting Performance	All of Us Strangers	Won	
Broadcasting Press Guild Awards	2021	Best Actor	Normal People	Nominated	
Broadcasting Press Guild Awards	2021	Breakthrough Award	Normal People	Nominated	
Dorian Awards	2020	Best TV Performance – Actor	Normal People	Nominated	
Dorian Awards	2023	Film Performance of the Year	Aftersun	Nominated	
Dorian Awards	2024	Supporting Film Performance of the Year	All of Us Strangers	Nominated	
Gotham Independent Film Awards	2022	Best Lead Performance	Aftersun	Nominated	
IFTA Film & Drama Awards	2021	Best Lead Actor – TV Drama	Normal People	Won	
IFTA Film & Drama Awards	2023	Best Lead Actor – Film	Aftersun	Won	
IFTA Film & Drama Awards	2023	Best Supporting Actor – Film	God's Creatures	Nominated	
IFTA Film & Drama Awards	2024	Best Supporting Actor – Film	All of Us Strangers	Won	
IFTA Film & Drama Awards	2025	Best Lead Actor – Film	Gladiator II	Nominated	
IFTA Film & Drama Awards	2026	Best Supporting Actor – Film	Hamnet	Won	
Independent Spirit Awards	2023	Best Lead Performance	Aftersun	Nominated	
MTV Movie & TV Awards	2021	Best Breakthrough Performance	Normal People	Nominated	
Royal Television Society Programme Awards	2021	Actor: Male	Normal People	Nominated	
Palm Springs International Film Festival	2026	Vanguard Award	Hamnet	Honored (Note: Shared with Jessie Buckley and Chloé Zhao)	
Satellite Awards	2026	Best Actor in a Supporting Role	Hamnet	Nominated	

== Theater awards ==
Organizations	Year	Category	Work	Result	Ref.
Drama League Awards	2025	Distinguished Performance Award	A Streetcar Named Desire	Nominated	
Dorian Awards	2025	Outstanding Performance in an Off-Broadway Play	A Streetcar Named Desire	Nominated	
Theater World Award	2025	Outstanding Broadway or Off-Broadway Debut Performance	A Streetcar Named Desire	Won	

== Other associations ==
Award	Year	Category	Nominated work	Result	Ref.
Astra Film Awards	2023	Best Actor	Aftersun	Nominated	
Astra Film Awards	2026	Best Supporting Actor - Drama	Hamnet	Nominated	
Alliance of Women Film Journalists	2023	Best Actor	Aftersun	Nominated	
Alliance of Women Film Journalists	2026	Best Supporting Actor	Hamnet	Nominated	
Alliance of Women Film Journalists	2026	Best Ensemble Cast & Casting Director	Hamnet	Nominated	
Austin Film Critics Association	2023	Best Actor	Aftersun	Nominated	
Chicago Film Critics Association	2022	Best Actor	Aftersun	Nominated	
Chlotrudis Awards	2023	Best Actor	Aftersun	Won	
Columbus Film Critics Association	2023	Best Lead Performance	Aftersun	Nominated	
Dallas–Fort Worth Film Critics Association	2025	Best Supporting Actor	Hamnet	4th place	
Denver Film Critics Society	2023	Best Actor	Aftersun	Nominated	
Denver Film Critics Society	2026	Best Supporting Actor	Hamnet	Nominated	
DiscussingFilm Critic Awards	2023	Best Actor	Aftersun	Nominated	
DiscussingFilm Critic Awards	2026	Best Supporting Actor	Hamnet	Nominated	
Dublin Film Critics' Circle	2022	Best Actor	Aftersun	Nominated	
Festival du nouveau cinéma	2022	Prix d'interprétation	Aftersun	Won	
Florida Film Critics Circle	2022	Best Actor	Aftersun	Nominated	
Georgia Film Critics Association	2023	Best Actor	Aftersun	Nominated	
Greater Western New York Film Critics Association	2022	Best Actor	Aftersun	Nominated	
Houston Film Critics Society	2026	Best Supporting Actor	Hamnet	Nominated	
Indiana Film Journalists Association	2022	Best Lead Performance	Aftersun	Nominated	
Indiana Film Journalists Association	2025	Best Supporting Performance	Hamnet	Nominated	
International Cinephile Society	2023	Best Actor	Aftersun	Won	
Kansas City Film Critics Circle	2023	Best Actor	Aftersun	Nominated	
Latino Entertainment Journalists Association	2023	Best Actor	Aftersun	Nominated	
Latino Entertainment Journalists Association	2026	Best Supporting Actor	Hamnet	Nominated	
London Film Critics' Circle	2023	Actor of the Year	Aftersun	Nominated	
London Film Critics' Circle	2023	British/Irish Actor of the Year	Aftersun	Nominated	
London Film Critics' Circle	2024	British/Irish Actor of the Year	All of Us Strangers / God's Creatures; Foe / Carmen	Won	
London Film Critics' Circle	2024	Supporting Actor of the Year	All of Us Strangers	Nominated	
Michigan Movie Critics Guild	2025	Best Supporting Actor	Hamnet	Nominated	
Minnesota Film Critics Alliance	2023	Best Actor	Aftersun	Nominated	
Minnesota Film Critics Alliance	2026	Best Supporting Actor	Hamnet	Nominated	
Music City Film Critics Association	2023	Best Actor	Aftersun	Nominated	
National Society of Film Critics	2023	Best Actor	Aftersun	Runner-up	
North Dakota Film Society	2023	Best Actor	Aftersun	Nominated	
North Dakota Film Society	2024	Best Supporting Actor	All of Us Strangers	Nominated	
North Dakota Film Society	2026	Best Supporting Actor	Hamnet	Nominated	
North Dakota Film Society	2026	Best Ensemble	Hamnet	Nominated	
North Texas Film Critics Association	2025	Best Supporting Actor	Hamnet	Nominated	
North Texas Film Critics Association	2025	Gary Murray Award	Hamnet	Nominated	
Online Association of Female Film Critics	2022	Best Male Lead	Aftersun	Nominated	
Online Film Critics Society	2023	Best Actor	Aftersun	Nominated	
Portland Critics Association	2025	Best Supporting Performance	Hamnet	Nominated	
Puerto Rico Critics Association	2026	Best Supporting Actor	Hamnet	Nominated	
San Francisco Bay Area Film Critics Circle	2023	Best Actor	Aftersun	Nominated	
San Francisco Bay Area Film Critics Circle	2025	Best Supporting Actor	Hamnet	Nominated	
Seattle Film Critics Society	2023	Best Actor in a Leading Role	Aftersun	Nominated	
SESC Film Festival	2023	Best Foreign Actor (Critics Award)	Aftersun	Won	
SESC Film Festival	2023	Best Foreign Actor (Audience Award)	Aftersun	Won	
St. Louis Film Critics Association	2022	Best Actor	Aftersun	Nominated	
St. Louis Film Critics Association	2025	Best Supporting Actor	Hamnet	Nominated	
St. Louis Film Critics Association	2025	Best Ensemble	Hamnet	Nominated	
Sunset Film Circle Awards	2022	Best Actor	Aftersun	Nominated	
Toronto Film Critics Association	2023	Best Actor	Aftersun	Won	
UK Film Critics Association	2022	Actor of the Year	Aftersun	Nominated	
Vancouver Film Critics Circle	2023	Best Actor	Aftersun	Nominated	
Washington D.C. Area Film Critics Association	2022	Best Actor	Aftersun	Nominated	
Washington D.C. Area Film Critics Association	2025	Best Ensemble	Hamnet	Nominated	

== See also ==
- List of Irish actors
- List of Academy Award winners and nominees from Ireland
- List of actors with Academy Award nominations
