= Caro Newling =

English theatre producer

Caroline Denise "Caro" Newling OBE (born 12 April 1957) is an English theatre producer and currently vice-president of the Society of London Theatre. Newling established the Donmar Warehouse with director Sam Mendes in 1992 and ran the London venue for ten years. Newling and Mendes produced over 70 productions together at the Donmar Warehouse including Cabaret (1993), Company (1995), The Glass Menagerie (1995), The Blue Room (1998) and Electra (1999). Newling and Mendes left the Donmar Warehouse in 2002 to found Neal Street Productions with Pippa Harris. In 2012, Newling, Mendes and Harris were joined by former BBC director of UK drama Nicolas Brown.

Neal Street Productions projects, produced by Caro Newling, have included The Ferryman, This House, Shrek the Musical and Charlie and the Chocolate Factory.

== Early years ==
Caroline Denise Newling was born on 12 April 1957. Newling is the adopted daughter of Alfred John Newling and Evelyn Fowler. She attended Brighton & Hove High School and Roedean. Newling studied at Warwick University from 1975 to 1978 and at Webber Douglas Academy of Dramatic Art in 1981.

== Career ==
After graduating from Warwick University, Newling began her career as an Assistant Stage Manager at Theatre Royal Stratford East, from 1978 to 1980.

Newling joined Ballet Rambert as Marketing Officer in 1984, working under Artistic Director Robert North, and moved to the Almeida Theatre as a Press Representative in 1985, under Artistic Director Pierre Audi.

In 1986, Newling joined the team at the Royal Shakespeare Company as a Press Officer for Mobile Tour, eventually becoming a Senior Press Representative during Terry Hands’ tenure as the artistic director.

While working for the RSC, Newling met director Sam Mendes and together they set up the initial incarnation of the Donmar Warehouse in 1991. The theatre opened in 1992, with Newling and Mendes continuing to run the venue until 2002. Together, Newling and Mendes produced over 70 productions, several of which transferred to the West End and Broadway, including Cabaret (1993), Company (1995), The Glass Menagerie (1995), The Blue Room (1998), and Electra (1999).

After a 10-year stint at the Donmar Warehouse, Newling and Mendes left to set up their own independent production company with TV producer Pippa Harris called Neal Street Productions, now 15 years old. Nicolas Brown also became a company director of Neal Street Productions in 2012, following a stint as director of UK drama for the BBC.

In 2015, Neal Street Productions was bought by All 3 Media. At Neal Street Productions, Newling has produced a number of theatrical productions in London's West End and on Broadway including the West End transfer of This House (2017), Shrek the Musical (2011), Charlie and the Chocolate Factory (2013) and The Ferryman (2017). Shrek the Musical now enjoys its second UK tour, with Laura Main (Call the Midwife) playing Princess Fiona, whilst Charlie and the Chocolate Factory is currently touring the US, both finishing in January 2019. On behalf of Neal Street Productions, Newling was co-producer of the award-winning play The Ferryman, written by Jez Butterworth (Britannia) starring Paddy Considine (Informer), which had record-breaking runs both at the Royal Court Theatre and The Gielgud Theatre and is currently enjoying a critically acclaimed run on Broadway.

Newling was the architect of The Bridge Project, bringing about a collaboration with the Old Vic Theatre in London and the Brooklyn Academy of Music in New York City. The collaboration extended over three years and included productions of The Winter's Tale (2009), The Cherry Orchard (2009), As You Like It (2010), The Tempest (2010) and Richard III (2011). All of The Bridge Project productions were directed by Sam Mendes and, combined, played to audiences in over 15 cities around the world.

Newling's other projects at Neal Street Productions have included UK and world premiere productions of David Lindsay Abaire's award-winning Fuddy Meers (2004), Anna in the Tropics (2004), David Hare's The Vertical Hour (2006), a new stage version of All About My Mother (2007) adapted by Sam Adamson, The House of Special Purpose (2009) by Heidi Thomas and Richard Greenberg's Three Days of Rain (2009) and most recently, The Moderate Soprano, starring Roger Allam and Nancy Carroll (2018) and Neal Street's co-production of The Lehman Trilogy (2018) with the National Theatre. The Lehman Trilogy, commissioned by Neal Street Production's three years ago, paired Pierre Audi of Park Avenue Armory with Rufus Norris of The National Theatre, resulting in a major co-production between both institutions.

After its Broadway engagement in March 2019, The Lehman Trilogy will transfer to the West End's Piccadilly Theatre in May 2019.

Newling is also co-producing a new musical theatre adaptation of Local Hero which will begin performances at the Lyceum Theatre in Edinburgh in March 2019 ahead of a season at London's Old Vic. Developed with the Lyceum Theatre and London's Old Vic, this will be their first ever co-production, together with Caledonia Productions and Creative Scotland, ultimately building relationships between David Grieg, Mark Knopfler, John Crowley and Scott Pask.

Other productions that have transferred to the West End or to Broadway during Newling's time at Neal Street Productions include Sunday in the Park with George (2006), Hamlet (2009), Mary Stuart (2009), Enron (2010), Red (2010), South Downs/The Browning Version (2012) and Merrily We Roll Along (2013).

Caro Newling was President of the Society of London Theatre from 2014 to 2017.

Neal Street Productions has a series of new productions in development.

== Board memberships ==
Caro Newling has been Chair of the Linbury Prize for Stage Design since 2009 and was made an honorary fellow of The Royal Welsh College Music and Drama in July 2017.

In October 2018, Caro Newling announced she was stepping down as Chair of Paines Plough after nine years, having led the charge to build Roundabout and consolidate James Grieve and George Perrin’s regime to re-vitalise the company.

Newling has sat on the boards of several of the UK's leading theatres and arts organisations during her career including the National Theatre (2002–2010), Chichester Festival Theatre (1999–2003), Made in Brighton Ltd (Director 2003 to 2006) and Adventures in Motion Pictures (1995–1997).

== Honours ==
Caro Newling was made an honorary fellow of the Royal Welsh College of Music & Drama in July 2017.

In 2018, Caro Newling was awarded an OBE for services to theatre.
