= Paul Mescal =

Irish actor (born 1996)

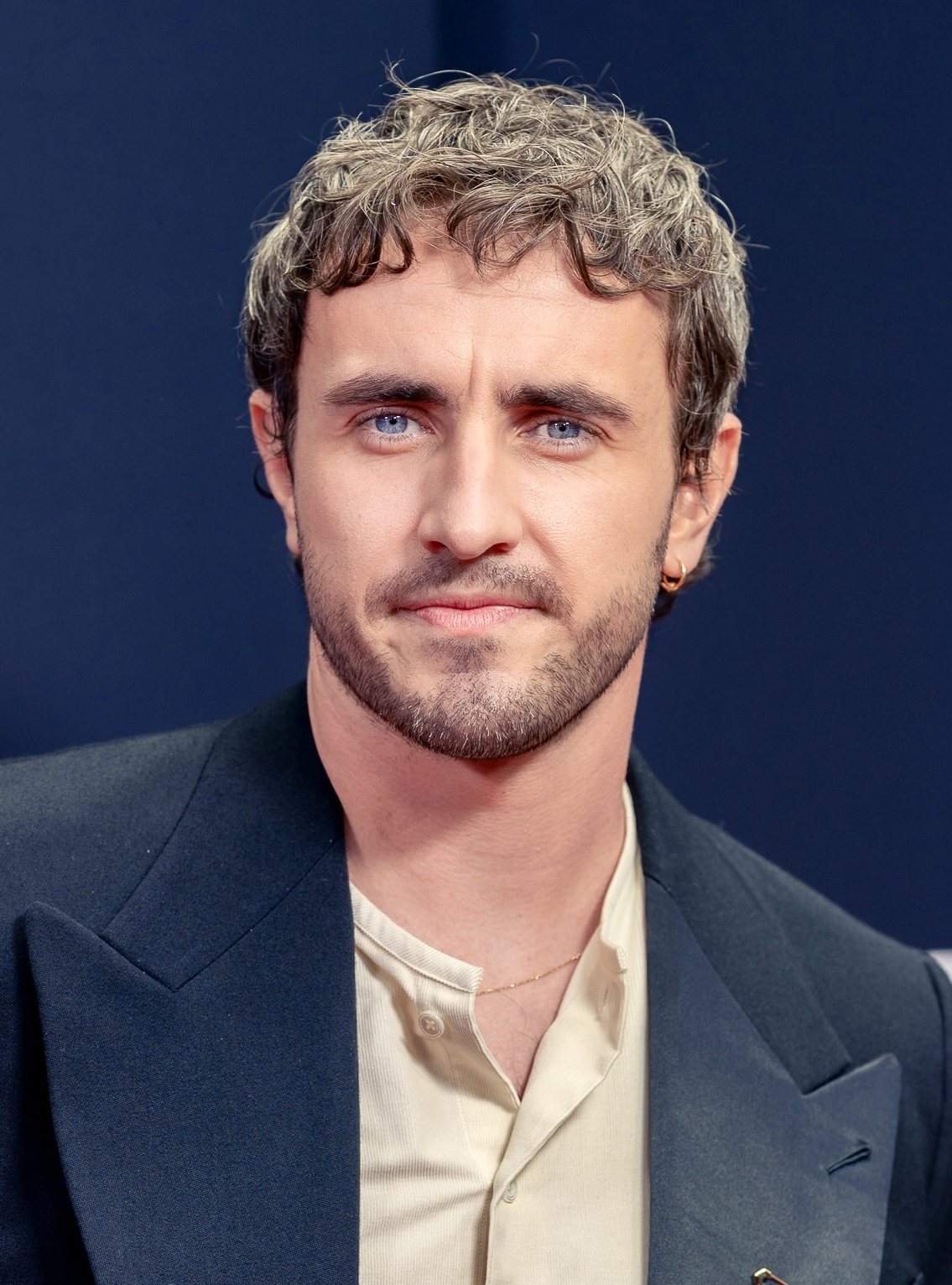
- Mescal in 2025
- Born: Paul Colm Michael Mescal; 2 February 1996 (age 30); Dublin, Ireland
- Education: Trinity College, Dublin (BA)
- Occupation: Actor
- Years active: 2017–present
- Relatives: Nell Mescal (sister)
- Awards: Full list

Paul Colm Michael Mescal (/ˈmɛskəl/ MESS-kəl; born 2 February 1996) is an Irish actor. His accolades include two BAFTA Awards and a Laurence Olivier Award, in addition to nominations for an Academy Award, a Primetime Emmy Award, and a Golden Globe Award.

Born in Dublin and raised in Maynooth, he studied acting at The Lir Academy and then performed in plays in Dublin theatres. Mescal's breakthrough came with a leading role in the BBC / Hulu romantic drama miniseries Normal People (2020), earning him the British Academy Television Award for Best Actor and a nomination for the Primetime Emmy Award for Outstanding Lead Actor in a Limited or Anthology Series or Movie.

Mescal transitioned to film acting with his debut in the psychological drama The Lost Daughter (2021). For his performance as a troubled father in the coming-of-age drama Aftersun (2022), he received a nomination for the Academy Award for Best Actor. He gained further recognition for his performances in the psychological drama All of Us Strangers (2023), the historical action film Gladiator II (2024), and for his portrayal of William Shakespeare in Hamnet (2025).

On stage, he portrayed Stanley Kowalski in a West End revival of the Tennessee Williams play A Streetcar Named Desire (2022), which won him the Laurence Olivier Award for Best Actor.

== Early life and education ==
Paul Colm Michael Mescal was born on 2 February 1996 in Dublin and raised in Maynooth, County Kildare, by Dearbhla Mescal Ni Molloy, a Garda, and Paul Mescal, a teacher who also acted semi-professionally. Mescal has a younger sister, the singer-songwriter Nell Mescal, and a younger brother, Donnacha.

Mescal attended Maynooth Post Primary School. He was a minor and under-21 Gaelic football player for Kildare and a member of the Maynooth GAA club. Gaelic footballer Brian Lacey praised Mescal's skills as a defender, while physical trainer Cian O'Neill described him as "mature beyond his years... very developed and very strong". Mescal gave up the sport after a jaw injury.

He performed on stage for the first time at age 16 in a school production, portraying the eponymous Phantom in the musical The Phantom of the Opera, after which he auditioned and gained admission to The Lir Academy at Trinity College Dublin. He graduated with a Bachelor of Arts in acting in 2017. He secured agents for his acting career prior to his graduation.

== Career ==
=== 2017–2020: Career beginnings ===
After earning his Bachelor of Arts degree, Mescal was offered roles in two theatre productions, Angela's Ashes and The Great Gatsby; he took on the latter and starred as the titular Jay Gatsby at the Gate Theatre in Dublin. In The Irish Times, Peter Crawley highlighted his work as a "butterfly of self-creation among an ensemble in constant motion and fluttering improvisation". He also portrayed the Prince in a contemporary retelling of Hans Christian Andersen's The Red Shoes at the same theatre that year. Mescal appeared in the world premiere of the 2018 play Asking for It by Louise O'Neill, co-produced by Landmark Productions and The Everyman in Cork. The production later transferred to the Abbey Theatre in Dublin; Steve Cummins of The Times commended his distinctive performance. The same year, he made his London stage debut in The Plough and the Stars at the Lyric Hammersmith and starred in the Rough Magic productions of A Midsummer Night's Dream for the Kilkenny Arts Festival and A Portrait of the Artist as a Young Man for the Dublin Theatre Festival. In 2020, he performed in the play The Lieutenant of Inishmore at Dublin's Gaiety Theatre.

Mescal starred in his first television role in the drama miniseries Normal People, an adaptation of the 2018 novel of the same name by Sally Rooney. It premiered in the UK on BBC Three and in the US on Hulu in 2020. He played student Connell Waldron; he viewed the role as different from himself in the way Waldron's traits include hesitance and emotional unavailability. Like the actor did in real life, the character plays Gaelic football and attends Trinity College. The role propelled Mescal to fame. He earned acclaim as well as the BAFTA TV Award for Best Actor for his performance. In their respective reviews for Variety and Slate, Caroline Framke called Mescal's navigation through the character's emotional collapse "breathtaking", while Willa Paskin noted his concurrent embodiment of "intelligence, insecurity and quiet confidence". He also received nominations for the Primetime Emmy Award for Outstanding Lead Actor in a Limited Series or Movie and the Critics' Choice Television Award for Best Actor in a Movie/Miniseries.

Mescal starred in Drifting, a short film, which was screened at the 2020 Galway Film Fleadh. He played a firefighter in the Channel 5 miniseries The Deceived and appeared in the music video for the song "Scarlet" by The Rolling Stones in August. Reviewing The Deceived, The Independent critic Ed Power highlighted Mescal's effortless "sleepy-eyed charm" and "flawless" Donegal accent.

=== 2021–present: Rise to prominence ===
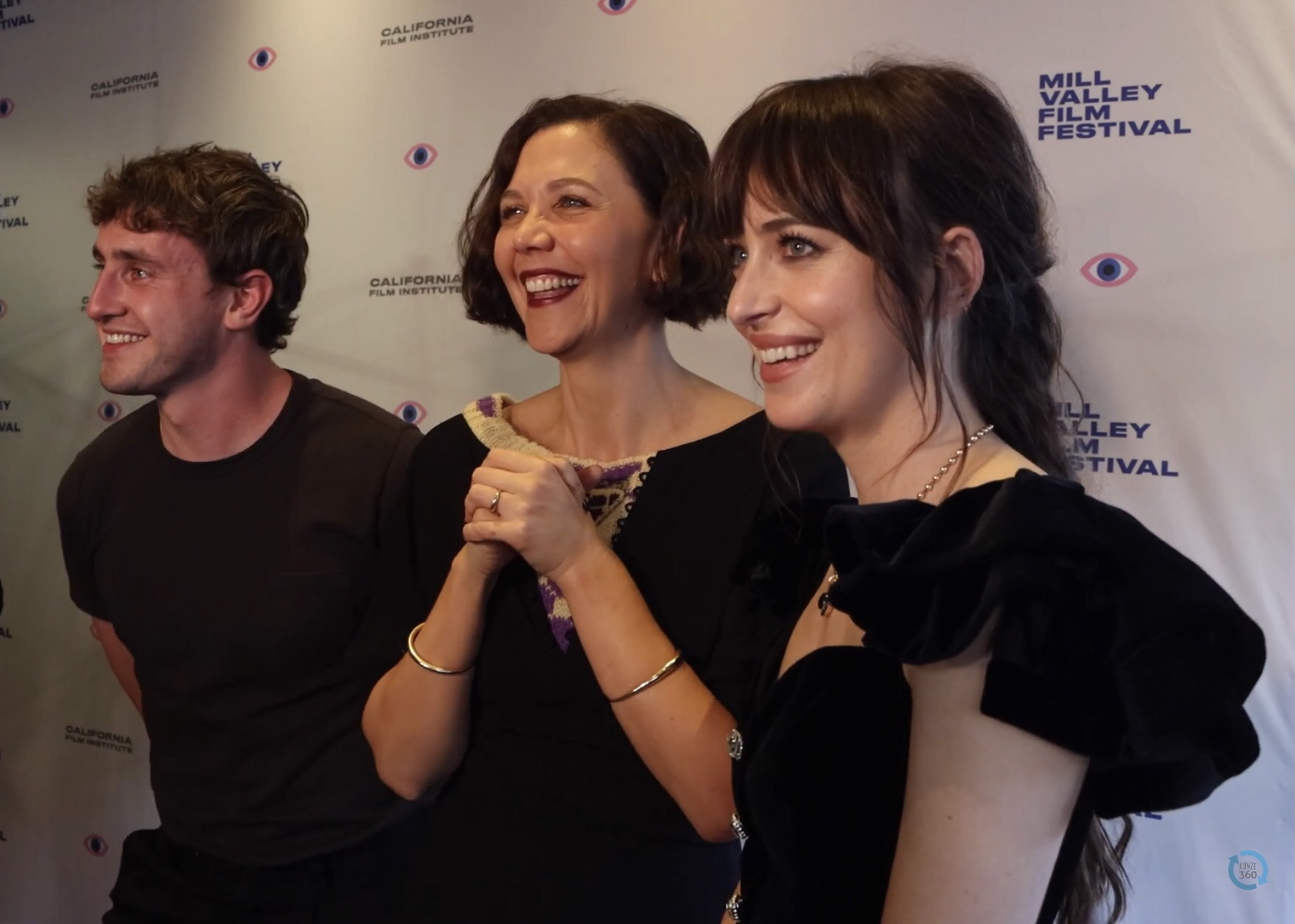
Mescal, Maggie Gyllenhaal, and Dakota Johnson promoting The Lost Daughter

Mescal made his feature film debut with a supporting role in The Lost Daughter, directed by Maggie Gyllenhaal in her directorial debut. Released in 2021, the psychological drama garnered favourable reviews. A year later, Mescal starred as a man accused of sexual assault in the psychological drama God's Creatures and as a troubled young father in the drama Aftersun, both of which premiered at the 2022 Cannes Film Festival. The two films received positive reviews with Mescal's performances gaining praise. IndieWire critic Kate Erbland found Mescal's work in God's Creatures "powerful" and "quietly chilling". Reviewing Aftersun, Peter Travers of ABC News highlighted his "disarming charm and elemental power" in his portrayal of a "complex role". He received nominations for the Academy Award for Best Actor and the BAFTA Award for Best Actor in a Leading Role for the latter.

Mescal starred in Carmen, which premiered at the 2022 Toronto International Film Festival and was theatrically released in 2023. IndieWire's David Ehrlich said that Mescal asserts his "gravitas" and "poise" playing a veteran of the US military. Mescal portrayed Stanley Kowalski in a revival of the play A Streetcar Named Desire by Tennessee Williams at the Almeida Theatre beginning in December 2022. The production met with acclaim and transferred to the West End in March 2023. The Times's Dominic Maxwell found him "tremendous" and opined that he "makes the latent violence of Stanley Kowalski into something easy, tangible, vibrant yet unactorly". Mescal won the Laurence Olivier Award for Best Actor for the role.

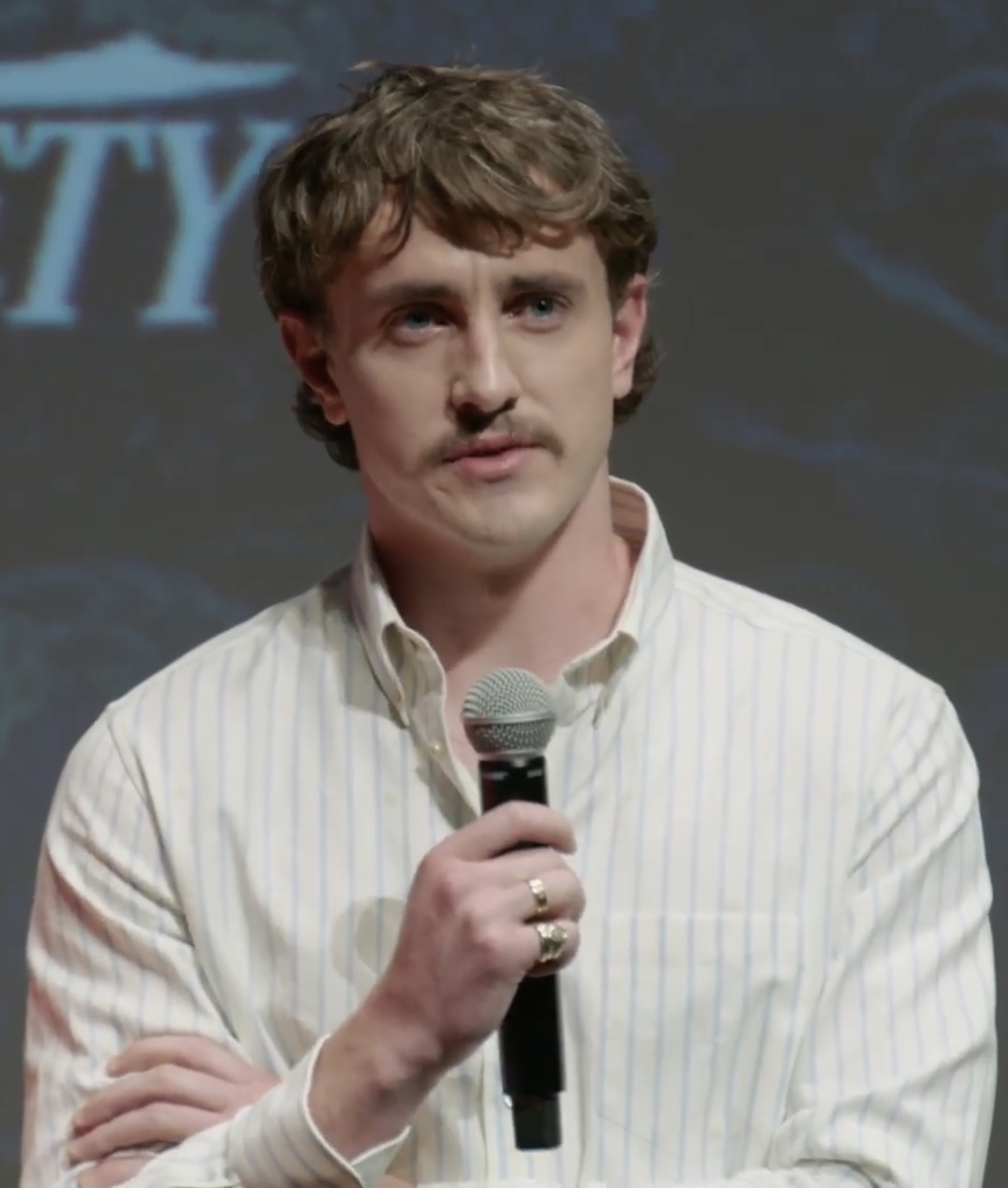
Mescal at the 2022 Directors' Fortnight in Cannes

In 2023, Mescal starred alongside Andrew Scott in All of Us Strangers, a loose adaptation of the novel Strangers by Taichi Yamada. He pursued the project as he was keen to play a "vivacious" and "front-footed" character for the first time in his career. It premiered at the 50th Telluride Film Festival. The Hollywood Reporter's David Rooney commended the "warm, sexy chemistry" between Mescal and Scott. For the role, Mescal received a nomination for the BAFTA Award for Best Actor in a Supporting Role. He also starred opposite Saoirse Ronan in Foe, an adaptation of Iain Reid's science fiction novel of the same name; the film was not well received by critics.

In 2024, Mescal was honoured by the Academy Museum of Motion Pictures with the Vantage Award, for emerging artists. He expanded to big-budget films with his starring role in Gladiator II, Ridley Scott's sequel to the 2000 historical drama, taking over the role played in childhood by Spencer Treat Clark. Scott cast him after watching his performance in Normal People. In preparation, Mescal practiced strength training, fight choreography, horse training, and sword fighting for six months. Slant Magazine's Jake Cole wrote, "Mescal gives a performance that recalls Russell Crowe's no-nonsense Maximus from Gladiator, right down to speaking in some of the same cadences and inflections". The film earned $460 million worldwide.

Mescal starred in The History of Sound, a 2025 romantic drama opposite Josh O'Connor, and portrayed William Shakespeare in Chloé Zhao's 2025 period drama Hamnet, based on the novel of the same name. He replaced Blake Jenner in the lead role of composer Franklin Shepard in Richard Linklater's Merrily We Roll Along, a film adaptation of the 1981 musical of the same name, which is set to be filmed over 20 years. Mescal has also been cast as Paul McCartney in Sam Mendes' four-part biopic on the Beatles, with the first scheduled to be released in April 2028. Mescal will return to the stage in 2027 in revivals of A Whistle in the Dark at the Abbey Theatre and National Theatre, and Death of a Salesman at the National Theatre.

In October 2026, Mescal was announced as an executive producer on the Irish short film Mary Is Missing.

== Personal life ==
Mescal speaks English and Irish. He moved from his native Ireland to London in 2020. In 2022, he said that he had bought a property in Ireland, with the intention of spending time there when he is not working. Mescal plays the piano and has performed covers of songs with his sister, singer Nell Mescal. In July 2020, he performed spoken word and sang with singer Dermot Kennedy at the Natural History Museum in London. He participated in a virtual stage reading of the play This Is Our Youth by Kenneth Lonergan as part of a series benefiting the Actors Fund of America charity in October 2020.

He is open about seeing a therapist, which he says is "to keep sane". He has said that fans should not feel entitled to know about his personal life and that he is not comfortable inviting any access into that part of his life.

He dated American singer Phoebe Bridgers from 2020 until December 2022. During their relationship, he appeared in Bridgers' music video for the song "Savior Complex", and provided backing vocals for Bridgers' cover of "So Much Wine", originally by The Handsome Family. Proceeds from the song were donated to the Los Angeles LGBT Center.

Mescal has been in a relationship with American singer and songwriter Gracie Abrams since 2024. He is credited as a cowriter on Abrams' song "Imaginary Friend".

In October 2026, he signed an open letter backing author Sally Rooney, whose books were withdrawn from sale in the United Kingdom due to her support for Palestine Action, and calling the withdrawal an "affront to basic principles of free speech and expression".

== Acting credits ==
Key
†	Denotes films that have not yet been released

=== Film ===
Year	Title	Role	Notes	Ref.
2021	The Lost Daughter	Will		
2022	God's Creatures	Brian O'Hara		
2022	Aftersun	Calum Patterson		
2022	Carmen	Aidan		
2023	All of Us Strangers	Harry		
2023	Foe	Junior		
2024	Gladiator II	Lucius Verus Aurelius / "Hanno"		
2025	The History of Sound	Lionel Worthing	Also executive producer	
2025	Hamnet	William Shakespeare		
2028	The Beatles – A Four-Film Cinematic Event †	Paul McCartney	Filming	
TBA	Merrily We Roll Along †	Franklin Shepard	Filming over 20 years	

=== Television ===
Year	Title	Role	Notes	Ref.
2020	Normal People	Connell Waldron	Miniseries	
2020	The Deceived	Seán McKeogh	Miniseries	
2024	Saturday Night Live	Himself (host)	Episode: "Paul Mescal/Shaboozey"	

=== Theatre ===
Year	Title	Role	Notes	Ref.
2017	The Great Gatsby	Jay Gatsby	Gate Theatre, Dublin	
2017–2018	The Red Shoes	Prince	Gate Theatre, Dublin	
2018	The Plough and the Stars	Lieutenant Langon	Lyric Theatre, London	
2018	Asking for It	Bryan	The Everyman, Cork	
2018	Asking for It	Bryan	Abbey Theatre, Dublin	
2018	A Midsummer Night's Dream	Demetrius	Kilkenny Arts Festival	
2018	A Portrait of the Artist as a Young Man	Stephen Dedalus	Dublin Theatre Festival	
2020	The Lieutenant of Inishmore	Mad Padraic	Gaiety Theatre, Dublin	
2022–2023	A Streetcar Named Desire	Stanley Kowalski	Almeida Theatre, London	
2023	A Streetcar Named Desire	Stanley Kowalski	Phoenix Theatre, London	
2025	A Streetcar Named Desire	Stanley Kowalski	Noël Coward Theatre, West End	
2025	A Streetcar Named Desire	Stanley Kowalski	BAM, Off-Broadway	
2027	A Whistle in the Dark	Michael Carney Jr.	Abbey Theatre, Dublin	
2027	A Whistle in the Dark	Michael Carney Jr.	National Theatre, London	
2027	Death of a Salesman	Biff Loman	National Theatre, London	

=== Music videos ===
Year	Title	Artist(s)	Ref.
2020	"Scarlet"	The Rolling Stones	
2020	"Savior Complex"	Phoebe Bridgers	

== Discography ==
Soundtrack

Year	Song	Film	Ref.
2023	"Slip Away"	Carmen	
2023	"Lullaby / Beyond – Vive La Musique"	Carmen	

== See also ==
- List of Irish actors
- List of Academy Award winners and nominees from Ireland
- List of actors with Academy Award nominations
