= The Magic Faraway Tree (film) =

British family film

- Theatrical release poster
- Directed by: Ben Gregor
- Screenplay by: Simon Farnaby
- Based on: The Faraway Tree by Enid Blyton
- Produced by: Pippa Harris; Nicholas Brown; Danny Perkins; Jane Hooks
- Starring: Andrew Garfield; Claire Foy; Nonso Anozie; Nicola Coughlan; Jessica Gunning; Jennifer Saunders; Rebecca Ferguson
- Cinematography: Zac Nicholson
- Edited by: Gary Dollner
- Music by: Isabella Summers
- Production companies: Palisades Park Pictures; Ashland Hill Media Finance; Neal Street Productions; Elysian Film Group
- Distributed by: Entertainment Film Distributors (United Kingdom); Vertical (United States)
- Release dates: 27 March 2026 (United Kingdom); 21 August 2026 (United States)
- Running time: 110 minutes
- Countries: United Kingdom; United States
- Language: English
- Box office: $35 million

The Magic Faraway Tree is a 2026 fantasy adventure film directed by Ben Gregor from a screenplay written by Simon Farnaby, adapted from Enid Blyton's book series The Faraway Tree. It stars Andrew Garfield, Claire Foy, Nonso Anozie, Nicola Coughlan, Jessica Gunning, Jennifer Saunders, and Rebecca Ferguson. It follows three young siblings who move with their parents to the countryside and discover a realm of magical worlds.

The film was released in the United Kingdom on 27 March 2026 and was released in the United States on 21 August 2026.

On 14 May 2026, it was announced that two sequels were in the works, and that production would commence in 2027.

== Plot ==
Tim and Polly Thompson live in the city with their three technology-addicted children, Beth (the eldest daughter), Joe (the only son and the middle child) and Fran (the youngest daughter). Polly is an inventor and has recently completed work on a new smart fridge for her company. However, upon learning they have secretly added hidden cameras to her design in order to spy on customers, she resigns from the job. Tim sees it as an opportunity to fulfil a dream they have long had of moving to the countryside and starting a home-grown tomato sauce business. Despite the two older children's protests, Tim and Polly choose a property out in the country and the family departs.

The Thompsons arrive at their new home to find that it is a ramshackle barn with no electricity or running water. The kindly farmers who sold them the barn decide to give them a few weeks to fix it up before committing to the £20,000 purchase. Fran, who is mute, speaks for the first time in years after an encounter with a fairy named Silky, who drops her purse by mistake and is overjoyed when Fran returns it. As thanks, Silky and her friend the Angry Pixie sneak into Fran's room at night to deliver an invitation for her to come to tea with them at the 'Magic Faraway Tree' in a nearby woodland.

Despite her parents warning her not to wander off, Fran follows the map and arrives at the Magic Faraway Tree, which transports her to a magical realm above the clouds. There, she reunites with Silky and meets other eccentric characters including Moonface, the Saucepan Man, Mr. Watzisname and Dame Washalot. They explain that a new land arrives at the top of the tree every day for them to visit. On that day, it is the Land of Goodies, which is full of oversized sweets including chocolates. Fran partakes of the treats and narrowly escapes being trapped in the land as it rotates away from the tree.

Meanwhile, Tim and Polly begin to fix up the barn and its farm equipment. Dissatisfied with her new home, Beth posts a letter to the children's grandmother, Polly's unscrupulous mother who works in London, asking her to come and take them away. Fran returns from the tree and nobody believes her story initially. Tim and Polly instruct Joe and Beth to accompany Fran during playtime and, though they are skeptical, agree to go with her to the Magic Faraway Tree. They are soon whisked away to the magical realm together, where they visit the Land of Birthdays. There, they meet the Birthday Elves, who offer them one wish each. Beth makes an offhanded wish for Tim's tomato sauce enterprise to fail, so that they can go back home; Joe and Fran waste their wishes on turning into a video game character and gaining a different voice respectively. The elves send them to the basement to visit Mr. Oom Boom Boom, a loud man who is able to reverse the wishes but tries to claim Silky as payment. The children rescue her and flee from the Land of Birthdays.

Over the following weeks, the members of the Thompson family grow closer as the children reconnect with their imaginations; Tim and Polly finally begin growing tomatoes. Eventually, Polly's mother arrives in response to Beth's letter, and gives a deadline for the sauce business to succeed or she will take the children away with her to London. Tim decides to hold a festival for the grand opening but, when the day finally arrives, all the tomatoes turn rotten and inedible as a result of Beth's wish. Feeling guilty for her self-serving actions, Beth rallies the other children to return to the Magic Faraway Tree and seek a way to reverse the wish.

Remembering Dame Washalot mentioning a Land of Spells, the children go to the Land of Know-It-Alls, where the children are informed by 'the Great Know-All' that they can get there via an aeroplane in the next room to fly between the lands, which Joe is able to use his video game experience to pilot. In the Land of Spells, Fran leads her siblings in a family song to encourage a merchant to part with the spell they need. The merchant is touched and agrees to hand it over. On their way back, the plane is waylaid at a dark land ruled by Dame Snap, a vicious headmistress who is running a strict school. Dame Snap captures the group and forces them to attend class. They purposely misbehave to give themselves detention so they can escape. When it turns out that detention is prison and they are unable to escape, the group talk - it is revealed that Tim used to visit the Magic Faraway Tree as a child. It touches Moonface that 'Timmy' came back and he comes up with a plan to escape.

The children make it back to the tomato farm with the reversal spell just in time for the grand opening. Tim and Polly are stunned to discover that their tomatoes are restored, bigger and healthier than before. The farmers arrive to complete the Thompsons' ownership of the barn, while the grandmother is thwarted by the business's success. As the whole village celebrates, Tim and Moonface briefly reunite.

== Cast ==
- Andrew Garfield as Tim Thompson
- Claire Foy as Polly Thompson
- Delilah Bennett-Cardy as Bethany “Beth” Thompson
- Phoenix Laroche as Joseph "Joe" Thompson
- Billie Gadsdon as Francesca "Fran" Thompson
- Nicola Coughlan as Silky
- Nonso Anozie as Moonface
- Jessica Gunning as Dame Washalot
- Jennifer Saunders as Grandma Thompson
- Rebecca Ferguson as Dame Snap
- Dustin Demri-Burns as the Saucepan Man
- Mark Heap as Mr. Oom Boom Boom
- Oliver Chris as Mr. Watzisname
- Jos Vantyler as The Birthday Elf
- Lenny Henry as The Great Know-All
- Michael Palin as Know-All
- Simon Russell Beale as Know-All
- Hiran Abeysekera as Angry Pixie
- Pippa Bennett-Warner as Hannah
- Simon Farnaby as the farmer
- Claire Keelan as the farmer's wife
- Ramon Tikaram as the market stall seller
- Judi Dench as the fridge

== Production ==
Simon Farnaby was attached to an adaptation of Enid Blyton's books in 2017, with options being placed on all four books in the series. The film was set up at StudioCanal. However, when personnel staffers were leaving StudioCanal to set up the Elysian Film Group, development continued on the live action feature film adaptation of The Faraway Tree.

In January 2024, it was reported that Elysian Film Group and Neal Street Productions would be producing the film, with Ben Gregor on board as director, and producers Pippa Harris, Nicolas Brown and Danny Perkins. The film would be adapted into the modern day, with director Gregor saying that it would tap into 21st century children's post-pandemic anxiety; it would still use characters from the books, such as Moonface, Saucepan Man, Dame Washalot, Silky, Angry Pixie and Mister Watzisname, as well as the lands at the top of the tree including the Land of Goodies and the Land of Birthdays.

In May 2024, Andrew Garfield and Claire Foy were confirmed in the cast to play Tim and Polly. Nicola Coughlan, Nonso Anozie and Jessica Gunning were among additional casting announced the following month; Jennifer Saunders, Hiran Abeysekera, Pippa Bennett-Warner and Rebecca Ferguson were added in August. The cast includes child actors Delilah Bennett-Cardy, Billie Gadsdon and Phoenix Laroche.

In November 2024, it was announced that the original musical score would be composed by Isabella Summers, from the band Florence and the Machine. The film would also contain an original song by Summers.

Principal photography on the film began at Shinfield Studios in Berkshire in June 2024. Filming wrapped in September 2024 and the film entered post-production shortly afterwards.

== Release ==
The Magic Faraway Tree was released theatrically in the United Kingdom on 27 March 2026. In April 2026, Vertical acquired the U.S. distribution rights for a 21 August release.

== Reception ==
=== Box office ===
The film debuted with £2.8 million ($3.7 million) at the box office. Premiering in the UK in March 2026, the film grossed more than $20 million there, plus more than $7 million in Australia. The film was the highest-grossing UK independent film in the first half of 2026.

=== Critical response ===
On the review aggregator website Rotten Tomatoes, 80% of 111 critics' reviews are positive, with an average rating of 6.4/10. The website's consensus reads: "Warm, charming, and quietly uplifting, The Magic Faraway Tree delivers a playful mix of whimsical characters, gentle humor, and a timely message about unplugging, making it an engaging and enjoyable family adventure."

=== Accolades ===
Award	Date of ceremony	Category	Recipient	Result	Ref.
National Film Awards UK	July 1, 2026	Best Feature Film	The Magic Faraway Tree	Nominated	
National Film Awards UK	July 1, 2026	Best Actress	Claire Foy	Nominated	
National Film Awards UK	July 1, 2026	Best Supporting Actress	Nicola Coughlan	Nominated	
National Film Awards UK	July 1, 2026	Best Supporting Actress	Jessica Gunning	Nominated	
National Film Awards UK	July 1, 2026	Best Supporting Actress	Jennifer Saunders	Nominated	
National Film Awards UK	July 1, 2026	Best Supporting Actor	Andrew Garfield	Nominated	
National Film Awards UK	July 1, 2026	Best Supporting Actor	Nonso Anozie	Nominated	
National Film Awards UK	July 1, 2026	Best Comedy	The Magic Faraway Tree	Won	
National Film Awards UK	July 1, 2026	Best Producer	Pippa Harris & Nicholas Brown	Nominated	
National Film Awards UK	July 1, 2026	Best British Film	The Magic Faraway Tree	Nominated	
