= The Beatles in popular culture =

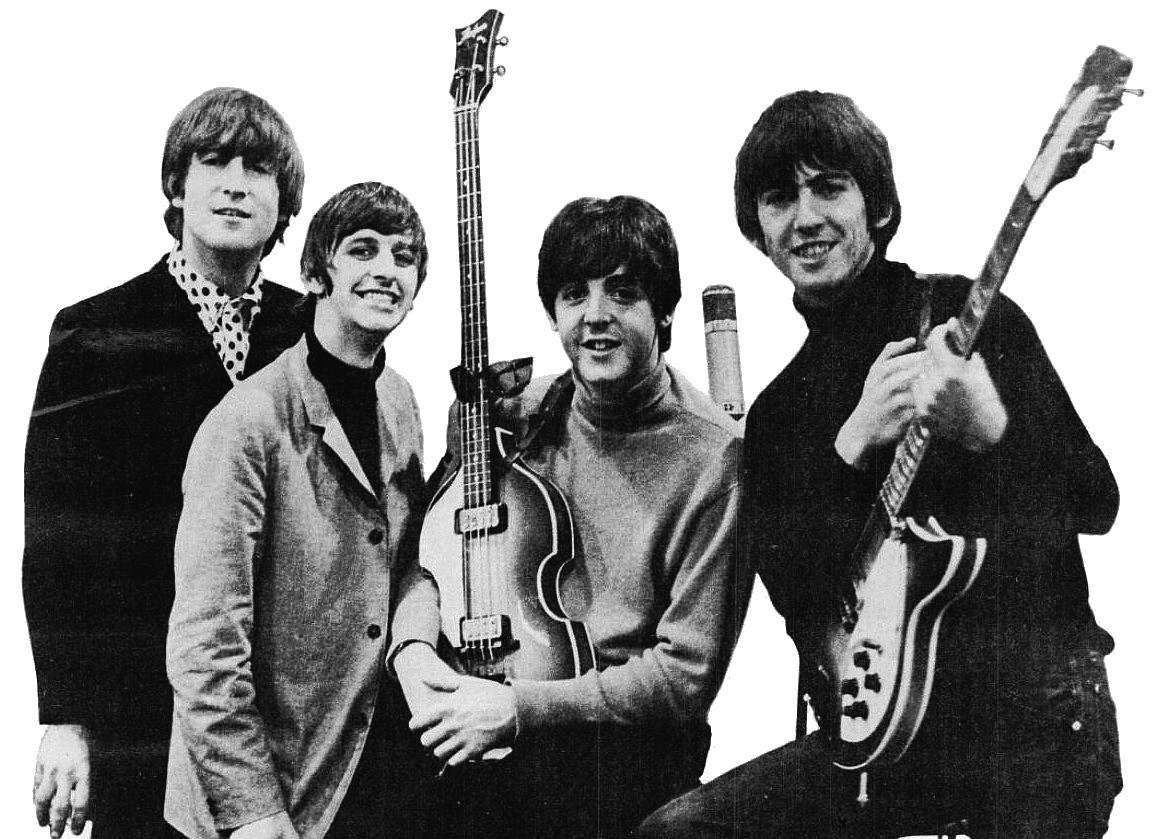
The Beatles in 1965.

This is a list of references to English rock group the Beatles in popular culture.

== Television ==
- The Beatles, a late 1960s American fictional animated television series featuring the band's musical misadventures.
- Petticoat Junction, "The Ladybugs": Hoping to cash in on Beatlemania, Uncle Joe recruits Billie Jo, Betty Jo, Bobbie Jo, and Sally to form a Beatles-like pop group.
- The Beagles, a 1967–1968 American animated television series in which its name is a takeoff on The Beatles.
- The Rutles, a mid 1970s series of sketches on the BBC television series Rutland Weekend Television, which would lead to the 1978 mockumentary film All You Need Is Cash.
- Sesame Street featured a parody band called "the Beetles", a group of four bugs with Liverpool accents and Beatle hair performing parodies of their songs, such as "Letter B" and "Hey Food".
- In the Dark Skies episode "Dark Days Night", a Hive plot to hijack the Beatles' broadcast on The Ed Sullivan Show and activate their latest agenda for world domination.
- In The Powerpuff Girls episode "Meet the Beat-Alls", Mojo Jojo, "Him", Princess Morbucks, and Fuzzy Lumpkins form a group of supervillains named "The Beat-Alls". There are many additional references to the Beatles, their history, songs, and albums through the episode. Also, in two parts of the episode, all 4 Beatles appear in their animated forms from The Beatles cartoon series and the Yellow Submarine film.
- The Beatles appeared and were mentioned several times in The Simpsons. Specifically, the episode "Homer's Barbershop Quartet" roughly parallels the Beatles' story, providing numerous references. The three surviving members of the band, at the time, have guest starred as themselves during the series on separate occasions.
- In the Wonder Pets! episode "Save the Beetles!", the Wonder Pets save a rock band named The Beetles, consisting of four Liverpudlian insects, whose yellow submarine is tangled in kelp. The band also performs a song titled "Kelp!", a parody of "Help!".
- In the Doraemon episode “The Nobeatles are Born!”, Nobita Nobi clones himself with one of Doraemon’s gadgets and forms a band called the Nobeatles, a portmanteau of his name and the Beatles.
- In the Amphibia episode "Battle of the Bands", in the scene where Sasha Waybright sees Anne Boonchuy's concept art for the group bug outfits, Marcy Wu the drummer of a band named "Sasha and The Sharps", is doing the peace sign. This could somewhat be a reference to Ringo Starr, who also does the peace sign. This reference is seen once again in the episode "Turning Point", where Sasha Waybright sees Anne Boonchuy's journal.
- Doctor Who featured a brief cameo of The Beatles in the second episode of season 1 "The Devil's Chord", which aired in 2024. The episode takes place in an alternate universe in which music is not valued and is seen as unnecessary, with John Lennon and Paul McCartney helping to bring the joy of music back to the universe.

== Film ==
- In the 1964 James Bond film Goldfinger, Bond is disparaging of the group, commenting: "My dear girl, there are some things that just aren't done, such as drinking Dom Perignon '53 above the temperature of 38 degrees Fahrenheit. That's just as bad as listening to the Beatles without earmuffs!"
- The 1967 film The Jungle Book features four vultures named Buzzie, Flaps, Ziggy and Dizzy, with Liverpudlian accents and mop-top hair style referencing the Beatles.
- The 1976 film All This and World War II features cover versions of Beatles songs by various famous musicians that are juxtaposed with World War II newsreel footage and 20th Century Fox films.
- The 1978 film I Wanna Hold Your Hand is about "Beatlemania" and is a fictionalized account of the day of the Beatles' first appearance on The Ed Sullivan Show.
- The rock musical Sgt. Pepper's Lonely Hearts Club Band, released in 1978, featured Beatles covers by the Bee Gees, Peter Frampton, Aerosmith, Earth, Wind & Fire and many other musical and non-musical celebrities.
- The 1978 television film All You Need Is Cash (based on a single sketch from a mid-1970s sketch series called Rutland Weekend Television) traces the career of a British rock group called The Rutles in mockumentary style.
- The 1986 film Ferris Bueller's Day Off features at least two references to the Beatles: Ferris (Matthew Broderick) states his admiration of John Lennon's quote "I don't believe in Beatles, I just believe in me," and later sneaks onto a parade float and lip-synchs to "Twist and Shout", to positive reception from the crowd.
- The 1994 film Backbeat chronicles the Beatles' Hamburg days.
- The 2000 Icelandic film Angels of the Universe, which focuses on schizophrenia and is mainly set in a psychiatric hospital, features one character, Óli, who believes himself to have written most Beatles songs and to have transmitted them to The Beatles via telepathy, even after the split of the band. "Hey Jude" is being "composed" by Óli in one scene of the film.
- In the 2001 film I Am Sam, Sam's daughter is named after the song "Lucy in the Sky with Diamonds". Lucy's idyllic early years are accompanied by "Across the Universe". Sam and Rita's relationship is seen growing to "Golden Slumbers". Sam's lawyer's name comes from The Beatles' song "Lovely Rita", a point made by Lucy. At the end of the film, "Two of Us" is used.
- The 2007 film Across the Universe is a musical that takes place during the 1960s. 34 Beatles compositions were performed in the film along with names of characters referenced in their music and multiple small allusions to The Beatles are scattered throughout the film.
- In the 2007 comedy film Walk Hard: The Dewey Cox Story, fictional Dewey Cox meets The Beatles who are purposefully portrayed satirically by Jack Black as Paul McCartney, Paul Rudd as John Lennon, Jason Schwartzman as Ringo Starr, and Justin Long as George Harrison.
- The 2008 film I'm Not There features a segment in the mid-1960s in which singer Jude Quinn (a fictionalised version of Bob Dylan, played by Cate Blanchett) visits London and is briefly seen fraternising with the Beatles.
- The 2019 film Yesterday written by Richard Curtis and directed by Danny Boyle is set in a world where no one has ever heard of The Beatles apart from one man. The film contains covers of many of their songs, including the titular track: Yesterday.
- A series of four films under the umbrella title The Beatles — A Four-Film Cinematic Event is to be released in April 2028. Each film is directed by Sam Mendes, and produced by Sony Pictures Entertainment, Neal Street Productions, and Apple Corps. Each film is set to be told from the perspective of each band member.

== Video games ==
- EarthBound had a large number of references to The Beatles.
- The Beatles: Rock Band, developed by Harmonix Music Systems, was released 9 September 2009.
- Beatle Quest
- Wolfenstein: The New Order and Wolfenstein: The New Colossus, an alternative history games developed by MachineGames, features a German singing version of The Beatles under the name "Die Käfer", who sing Nazi propaganda songs, which are mostly parodies of real-life Beatles songs.

== The Beatles mentioned in song ==
- "All I Want for Christmas is a Beatle", a 1963 novelty song by Dora Bryan.
- "A Letter to the Beatles", a 1964 novelty song by the Four Preps.
- "Pop Hates the Beatles", a 1964 song parody by Allan Sherman done in the tune of "Pop! Goes the Weasel".
- 1964 song, "The Beatles Are in Town" by the Fondettes.
- "We Love You Beatles", a 1964 novelty song by The Carefrees.
- 1964 song, "I Want a Beatle for Christmas" by Becky Lee Beck.
- 1965 song "A Simple Desultory Philippic" by Simon and Garfunkel: "I been Rolling Stoned and Beatled till I'm blind"
- 1969 song, "Pink Wine Sparkles in the Glass" by the Guess Who: "McCartney and Lennon just paid all the bills..."
- The Who song "The Seeker": "I asked Bobby Dylan, I asked the Beatles..."
- Mott the Hoople song "All the Young Dudes": "And my brother back at home with his Beatles and his Stones..."
- 1970 song "Ball of Confusion (That's What the World Is Today)" by The Temptations: "Unemployment rising fast, the Beatles new record's a gas"
- 1970 song "God" by former Beatles member John Lennon: "I don't believe in Beatles!"
- 1971 song "American Pie" by Don McLean: "While the Sergeants played a marching tune..."
- 1971 song "Dental Hygiene Dilemma" by Frank Zappa: "It's the same and mysterious exotic oriental fragrance as what the Beatles get off on."
- 1971 song "Never Been to Spain" by Hoyt Axton: "Well I've never been to England but I kinda like the Beatles"
- In the 1975 song "Don't Call Us, We'll Call You by Sugarloaf: features the lyric, "and it sounds like John, Paul & George" followed by the riff from "I Feel Fine"
- 1975 song "Shooting Star" by Bad Company: "Johnny was a schoolboy when he heard his first Beatles song. 'Love Me Do', I think it was from there it didn't take him long."
- 1976 song "Shangri-La" by Electric Light Orchestra: "Faded like the Beatles on 'Hey Jude'..."
- 1976 song "Keep On Rockin'" by Sammy Hagar: "I've been Beatled, I've been Rolling Stoned"
- 1977 song "1977" by The Clash: "No Beatles, Elvis or The Rolling Stones"
- 1977 song "Taxman, Mr. Thief" by Cheap Trick, whose title and lyrics reference the Beatles' "Taxman": "Like the Beatles he ain't human..."
- 1978 song "Born in the 50's" by the Police: "They screamed when the Beatles sang"
- 1978 song "Gone with the Music" by Voyage: "All you need is love and the music"
- In the 1979 song "London Calling" by The Clash, the line "Phony Beatlemania has bitten the dust" appears to be aimed at the movement itself. However, Mick Jones stated in an interview that "[the line] was aimed at all the touristy sound-alike rock bands in London in the late '70s." and that he and the rest of the band were fans of the group.
- 1982 song "Are the Good Times Really Over" by Merle Haggard: "Before the Beatles and yesterday"
- 1983 song, "Beatles Forever" by Electric Light Orchestra.
- 1983 song "The Late Great Johnny Ace" by Paul Simon: "It was the year of the Beatles"
- 1985 song "Life in a Northern Town" by The Dream Academy: "It felt like the world would freeze, with John F. Kennedy and The Beatles"
- 1986 song "One Love" by Whodini: "Now I know what the Beatles were thinkin' of when they said that money can't buy you love."
- 1987 song "Rocket" by Def Leppard: "...Sergeant Pepper and the band"
- 1989 song "We Didn't Start the Fire" by Billy Joel: “British Beatlemania...”
- 1990 song "Here We Go (Let's Rock & Roll)" by C+C Music Factory: "Ed Sullivan was on the TV screens to be seen with the Beatles and the Jackson 5"
- 2000 song "I Hate Pop Songs" by Suicidal Tendencies: "How many bands can rip off the Beatles"
- Gorillaz song "Revolving Doors": "I sit in a diner, And the Beatles play..."
- 2010 song "Gorgeous" by Kanye West: "And what's a black Beatle anyway?"
- 2011 song "Beatles and Stones" by Beady Eye: "Like Beatles and Stones"
- In the 2017 song "Echame La Culpa" by Demi Lovato and Luis Fonsi, the line "Play me like The Beatles, baby, just let it be" references the band and their song "Let it Be".
- In the 2018 song "Going Bad" by Meek Mill featuring Drake, the latter raps, "I got more slaps than the Beatles", referencing how he beat the band's record for the most top-ten singles on the Billboard Hot 100 chart within a single year, which they had previously held since 1964. After beating the record, Drake got a tattoo of himself walking in front of the group in their Abbey Road formation, appearing to be waving back at them.

== See also ==
- Outline of the Beatles
- The Beatles timeline
