= Nell Mescal =

Irish singer

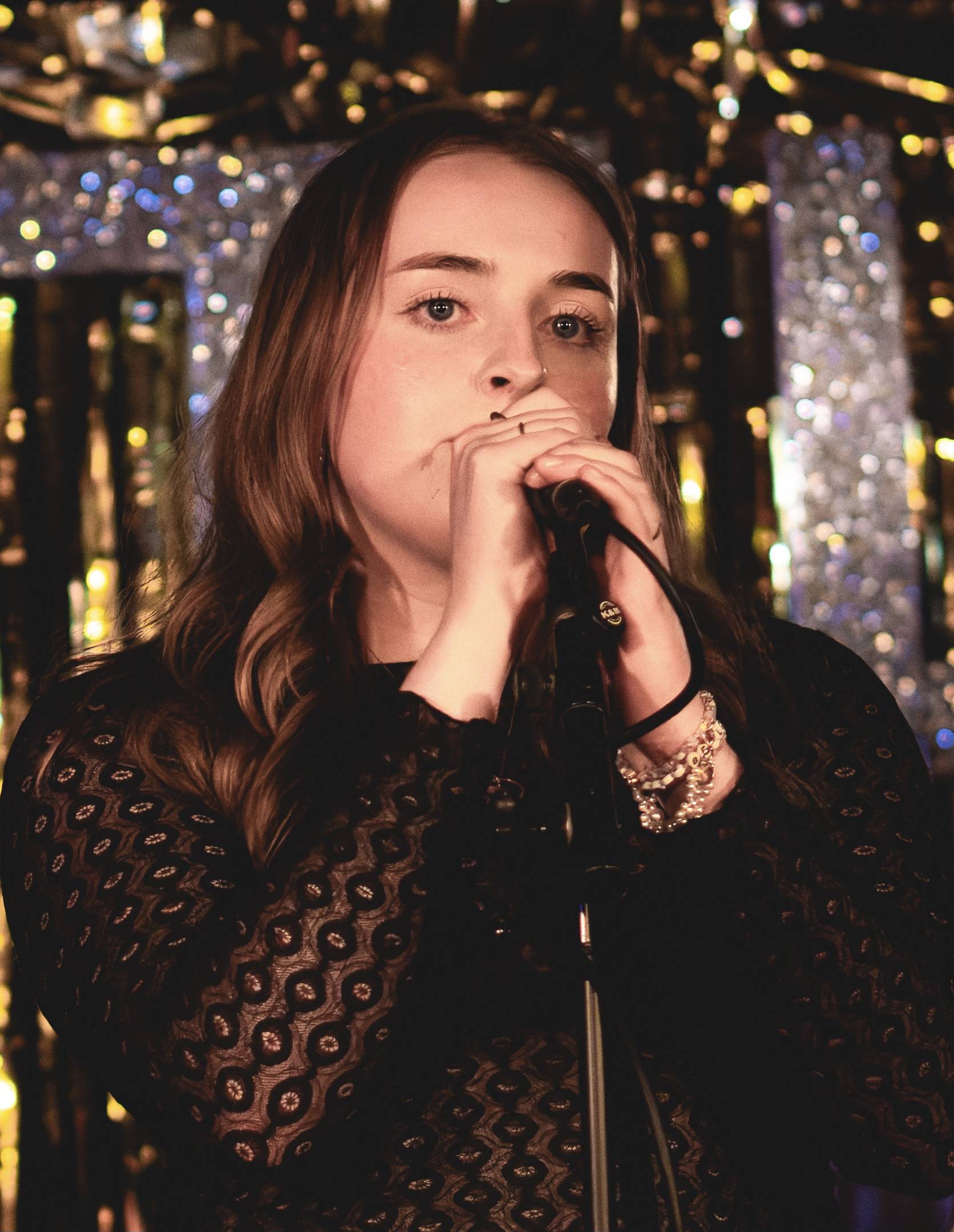
- Mescal performing at Moth Club in July 2024

Background information
- Born: 28 April 2003 (age 23); Maynooth, County Kildare, Ireland
- Genres: Indie pop; indie folk
- Instruments: Vocals; piano
- Years active: 2020–present
- Labels: Q Prime; LAB; Atlantic Records
- Website: nellmescal.com

Nell Mescal (born 28 April 2003) is an Irish singer-songwriter.

== Early life ==
Mescal is from Maynooth, County Kildare. She is the younger sister of actor Paul Mescal. They have performed a few song covers as a duet. They also have a middle brother, Donnacha.

Mescal was bullied at school. When she was 14, she was diagnosed with scoliosis and had to have back surgery. It was during her recovery time off from school that she honed her music skills. At 17, she spent three months in Brighton where her career began. She left school early in October 2021 for London to pursue music full-time.

== Career ==
Mescal released her debut single "Crash" in 2020, working with producer John Leader. This was followed by "Deja Vu", "Swingsets", and "Missing You". She gained attention through song covers she posted on social media, catching the eye of public figures such as Jennifer Garner and James Bay. She performed professionally for the first time at Shoreditch House in 2021, supporting Phoebe Bridgers.

In 2022, Mescal released the single "Graduating", which she wrote about her decision to forgo finishing school in favour of music, and opened two tours, including the UK leg of Phoebe Green's. Her first headline show took place at the Social in Fitzrovia that September, and she was also part of in Victoria Park's All Points East line-up.

This was followed by another single "Homesick", which Mescal performed with her band on RTÉ One's The Late Late Show in January 2023, marking her first television appearance. With the release of the single "Punchline", Mescal announced a UK and Ireland headline tour, beginning in October 2023. She played at a number of festivals, including The Great Escape Festival, BST Hyde Park, Dot to Dot Festival, Latitude Festival, Boardmasters Festival, Electric Picnic, Kendal Calling, and Live at Leeds. She also supported Birdy's Dublin show.

In January 2024, alongside releasing single "Killing Time", Mescal announced her debut EP Can I Miss it for a Minute?, set to be published in May 2024 via LAB Records. Mescal described it as a "concept EP written about growing up, moving away, friendship breakups, and trying to navigate between current emotions and negative memories".

Mescal signed with Atlantic Records in 2025 and released the demo track "Thin". In 2026, Mescal released the singles, “Kissing the Ground” and “Settles”.

== Artistry ==
Mescal grew up listening to Mary Chapin Carpenter and Fleetwood Mac through her parents. She said she has sung her whole life and began writing music when she was 13. She has named artists such as Birdy, Lennon Stella, Jensen McRae, Orla Gartland, Taylor Swift, Bon Iver, the 1975, and Finneas O'Connell as inspirations of hers. NME compared Mescal's music to early Tate McRae and Lucy Dacus.

== Personal life ==
In 2026, Mescal opened up about her sexuality and revealed her relationship with Internet personality Madison Cawley.

== Discography ==
=== EPs ===
Title	Release date	Track Listing
Teeth	8 September 2023	1. "Teeth"; 2. "Punchline"; 3. "In My Head"; 4. "Homesick"
Can I Miss it for a Minute?	3 May 2024	1. "Warm Body"; 2. "Yellow Dresser"; 3. "Killing Time"; 4. "Electric Picnic"; 5. "July"
The Closest We'll Get	24 October 2025	1. "Middle Man"; 2. "The Closest We'll Get"; 3. "Carried Away"; 4. "See You Again"; 5. "Lose You Altogether"; 6. "Sweet Relief"

=== Singles ===
Year	Title	Album/EP
2020	"Crash"	Non-album single
2020	"Déjà Vu"	Non-album single
2020	"Swingsets"	Non-album single
2020	"Missing You"	Non-album single
2022	"Graduating"	Non-album single
2023	"Homesick"	Teeth
2023	"In My Head"	Teeth
2023	"Punchline"	Teeth
2024	"Killing Time"	Can I Miss it for a Minute?
2024	"Warm Body"	Can I Miss it for a Minute?
2024	"Yellow Dresser"	Can I Miss it for a Minute?
2025	"Thin (demo)"	Non-album single
2025	"Carried Away"	The Closest We'll Get
2026	"Kissing the Ground"	N/A
2026	"Settles"	N/A
2026	"Hers"	

=== As featured artist ===
Year	Title	Artist	Album/EP
2024	"orange juice [Edit]"	Alfie Jukes	Non-album single
