= Pippa Harris =

British film and television producer

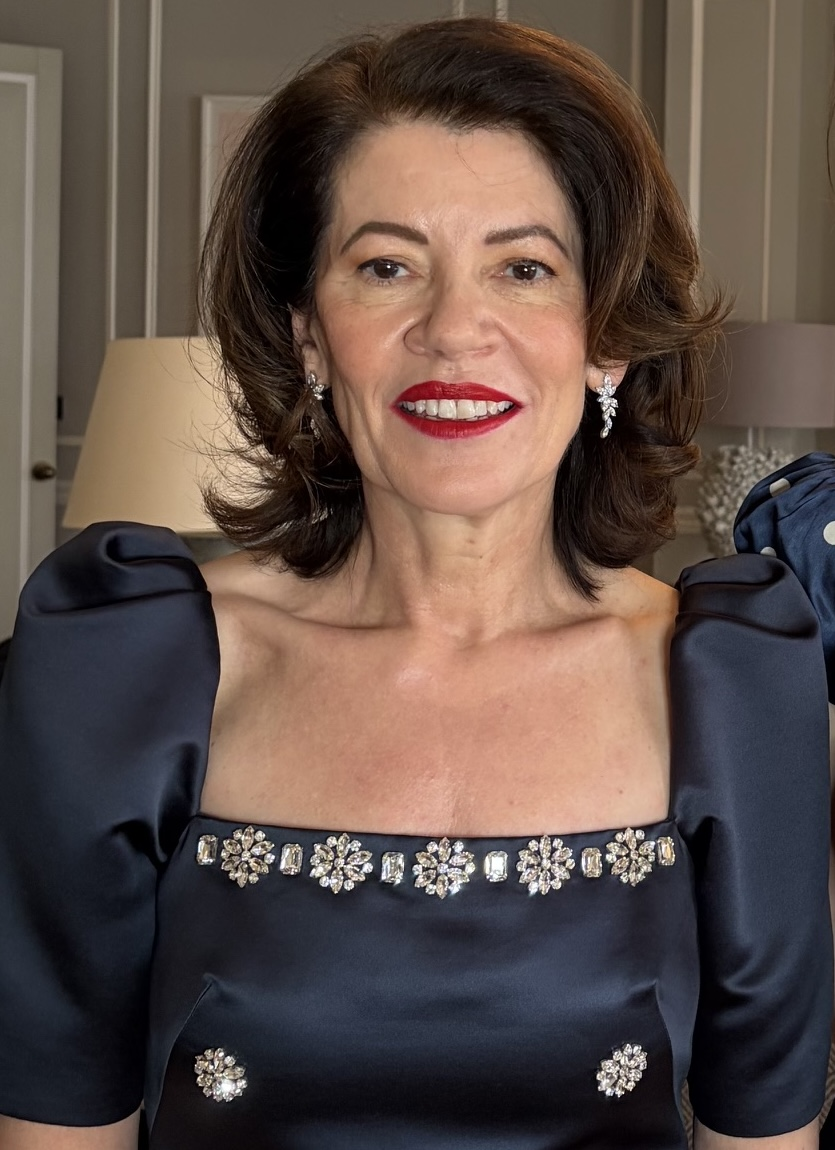
- Harris ahead of the BAFTAs 2026
- Born: Philippa Jill Olivier Harris; 1967 (age 58–59); Oxford, England
- Education: Robinson College, Cambridge
- Occupations: Film and Television producer
- Known for: Call the Midwife, 1917, Hamnet

Dame Philippa Jill Olivier Harris DBE (born 27 March 1967), known as Pippa Harris and Dame Pippa Harris, is a British film and television producer. She co-founded Neal Street Productions in 2003 with Sam Mendes and Caro Newling.

Harris was a script editor at ITV and Channel Four before becoming a development executive at BBC Films and then an executive producer for BBC Drama Serials. In that role her projects included Warriors and Love in a Cold Climate. Harris became Head of Drama Commissioning for the BBC in 2001. Commissions during her time there included Daniel Deronda and The Lost Prince.

Harris has produced several films including the acclaimed 2026 film Hamnet, directed by Chloé Zhao and starring Jessie Buckley and Paul Mescal, and The Magic Faraway Tree. She has also executive produced Things We Lost in the Fire and Revolutionary Road starring Leonardo DiCaprio and Kate Winslet. For TV Harris produced Stuart: A Life Backwards featuring Tom Hardy and Benedict Cumberbatch and executive produced Call the Midwife, Penny Dreadful and The Hollow Crown and Britannia. Harris served as Adviser to the former leader of the Liberal Democrats Nick Clegg MP, with whom she had studied at Robinson College, Cambridge.

For the film 1917 directed by Sam Mendes, Harris received various accolades, including an Academy Award for Best Picture nomination, two BAFTA Awards and a Golden Globe Award.

In June 2026, Pippa Harris was included in Variety's Inaugural Women's Impact Report UK, celebrating women whose leadership, creativity and influence are shaping the future of the entertainment and creative industries.

== Early years ==
Harris is the granddaughter of medical doctor Noël Olivier. She was educated at Oxford High School for Girls and Robinson College, Cambridge, where she graduated with a degree in English in 1989.

== Career ==
Harris started her career as a production assistant at Jacaranda Productions in 1989 and progressed quickly through roles as a script editor for ITV and Channel 4 before becoming development executive at BBC Films. She was then promoted to Executive Producer, BBC Drama Serials. Harris worked on Warriors (1999), Care (2000), The Sleeper (2000) The Way We Live Now (2001) and Love in a Cold Climate (2001).

In 2001, Harris became Head of Drama Commissioning for the BBC, working with Jane Tranter. Her BBC commissions included Cutting It (2002), Flesh and Blood (2002), Daniel Deronda (2002), The Lost Prince (2003) and State of Play (2003).

In 2003, Pippa Harris co-founded Neal Street Productions with partners Sam Mendes and Caro Newling. Since forming the company, Harris has produced several films, including Jarhead (2005), Starter for 10 (2006) and Blood (2012). She has executive produced Things We Lost in the Fire (2007), Revolutionary Road (2008) and Away We Go (2009).

For television, Harris has produced Stuart: A Life Backwards (2007) as well as the frightening psychological thriller, Penny Dreadful created and written by John Logan for Showtime / Sky Atlantic. She also executively produced the critically acclaimed, BAFTA nominated Shakespeare film series, The Hollow Crown (2012) and The Hollow Crown: The War of the Roses (2016), as well as Britannia (2018) which was the first co-production between Sky and Amazon Prime Video in 2018, starring Kelly Reilly, David Morrissey, Zoë Wanamaker, Liana Cornell and Stanley Weber.

She made a cameo appearance in series 15, episode 8 of Call The Midwife as an mourner during the funeral of Sister Monica Joan.

Harris currently serves as the executive producer of the BAFTA and NTA winning series Call the Midwife.

In 2018, Harris was appointed Chair of BAFTA, after a year as the Deputy Chair and she was then appointed BAFTA's VP for Television in 2021. Pippa is also Chair of The Charleston Trust and is a board member of the Royal Foundation of the Prince and Princess of Wales.

She is the editor of her grandmother's correspondence with poet Rupert Brooke between 1908 and 1915.

== Damehood ==
Harris was elevated to a Dame Commander of the Order of the British Empire (DBE) in the 2015 Dissolution Honours Lists on 27 August 2015.

== Board memberships ==
Pippa Harris is BAFTA's Vice President for Television, having previously Chaired the BAFTA Film Committee 2015-2017, and having been Chair of the Academy in 2018-2020. Since 2021, Pippa Harris has been Chair of Trustees at Charleston. She has served on its board since 2015. Pippa has also been a governor of Central School of Speech and Drama, and a Trustee of the Creative Society.

In 2023, Harris was selected to join the board of the Royal Foundation Charity.

== Accolades ==
- Producers Guild Award for Outstanding Producer of Theatrical Motion Pictures for Hamnet
- Academy Award for Best Picture nomination for 1917
- BAFTA Award for Best Film for 1917
- BAFTA Award for Outstanding British Film for 1917
- Golden Globe Award for Best Motion Picture – Drama for 1917
- Producers Guild Award for Outstanding Producer of Theatrical Motion Pictures for 1917
- Academy Award for Best Picture nomination for Hamnet
- Golden Globe Award for Best Motion Picture – Drama for Hamnet
- Producers Guild Award for Outstanding Producer of Theatrical Motion Pictures nomination for Hamnet

== Bibliography ==
- Brooke, Rupert; Olivier, Noel (1991). Harris, Pippa (ed.). Song of love: the letters of Rupert Brooke and Noël Olivier. Crown Publishing. ISBN 978-0-517-59090-4. Full text on Internet Archive
