= Scarlet (song) =

2020 single by The Rolling Stones

Single by The Rolling Stones featuring Jimmy Page

from the album Goats Head Soup (2020 reissue)
- Released: 22 July 2020
- Recorded: October 1974
- Length: 3:44
- Label: Polydor
- Songwriter: Jagger/Richards
- Producer: Jimmy Miller

The Rolling Stones singles chronology
"Criss Cross" (2020)	"Scarlet" (2020)	"Troubles a' Comin" (2021)

Music video
- "Scarlet" on YouTube

"Scarlet" is a song by English rock band the Rolling Stones featuring guitarist Jimmy Page. The song was released through Polydor as a single from the reissue of the 1973 album Goats Head Soup on 22 July 2020.

== Background and composition ==
"Scarlet" is written by Mick Jagger and Keith Richards, and produced by Jimmy Miller. It is described as "a raw, scratchy, loose limbed and actually rather sweet ditty with a cod reggae feel and lots [...] of guitars". The lyrics narrate "a girl named Scarlet who is doing [Jagger] wrong". It was recorded in October 1974. Jagger stated that the song originated in musician Ronnie Wood's home in Richmond, London during a studio session with Richards and guitarist Jimmy Page, while Richards recalled walking in during the end of rock band Led Zeppelin's session, after which their guitarist, Page, "decided to stay". It is thought to be titled after Page's daughter, Scarlet Page. When asked why it went unreleased for nearly 50 years, Jagger said that the song "wasn't really a Rolling Stones record".

== Remixes ==
On 14 August 2020, the band released a remix by rock band the War on Drugs, which introduced "a pulsing new groove that kicks into double-time for the chorus". A second remix, featuring rock band the Killers and DJ Jacques Lu Cont was released on 28 August. It involved "a resonant, reverberating opening" and "layers of symphonic touches".

== Music video ==
The music video stars Irish actor Paul Mescal, and was filmed at Claridge's Hotel in London with social distancing. It depicts Mescal in hotel rooms and empty bars, leaving the titular character desolate voice messages, drinking, dancing, and eventually collapsing in the lobby. The music video was directed by Chris Barrett and Luke Taylor, and released on 6 August 2020.

== Personnel ==
Credits adapted from AllMusic.

The Rolling Stones

- Mick Jagger – vocals, guitar
- Keith Richards – guitar

Additional personnel

- Ian Stewart – piano
- Ric Grech – bass
- Howard Kilgour – engineering
- Jimmy Miller – production
- Jimmy Page – guitar
- Bruce Rowland – drums
- Rod Thear – engineering

== Charts ==
Chart (2020)	Peak position
US Adult Alternative Airplay (Billboard)	31
