= Louise O'Neill =

Irish writer

- Born: 1985 (age 40–41); Clonakilty, Ireland
- Occupations: Novelist; freelance journalist
- Writing career
- Language: English
- Genre: Young adult fiction
- Subject: Feminist issues
- Notable work: Asking For It
- Notable awards: 2014 Irish Book Awards Newcomer of the Year: Only Ever Yours; 2015 Irish Book Awards Children's Book of the Year (Senior): Asking For It

Louise O'Neill is an Irish author who writes primarily for young adults.

== Early Life ==
She was born in 1985 and grew up in Clonakilty, in West Cork, Ireland. Her father ran their family butcher shop. She has a sister.

== Career ==
O'Neill moved to New York City in 2010. Upon returning to Ireland in 2011, O'Neill began her first novel Only Ever Yours, which was published in 2014. She has since won the Sunday Independent Newcomer of the Year at the 2014 Bord Gáis Energy Irish Book Awards; the Children's Books Ireland Eilís Dillon Award for a First Children's Book; and The Bookseller's inaugural YA Book Prize 2015. The success of her debut, originally published as a novel for young adults, led Quercus to issue a new edition in 2015 aimed at a general audience. The Guardian called O'Neill "the best YA fiction writer alive today".

Her second book, Asking For It, was a number-one bestseller in Ireland and won several awards, including being named Irish Times Book of the Month in September 2015, Book of the Year at the Irish Book Awards 2015, the honour prize for fiction at the CBI awards 2016. and the American Library Association's Michael L. Printz Honor for excellence in literature written for young adults. The New York Times called it "riveting and essential". Asking For It was one of the top ten best-selling books in Ireland in 2016.

She sold the rights to two of her books: Killer Content acquired the film and TV rights for Only Ever Yours, and Bandit Television owns TV rights for Asking For It.

O'Neill works as a freelance journalist for a number of Irish national newspapers and magazines, covering feminist issues, fashion and pop culture. As of 2016, she has written as a weekly columnist for the Irish Examiner. She was a contributor to I Call Myself A Feminist, a collection of essays from women under 30 explaining why they see themselves as feminists. She won the Literature Award at the Irish Tatler Women of the Year Awards 2015, Best Author at the Stellar Shine Awards 2015 and the Praeses Elite award by Trinity College Dublin.

She hosted the RTÉ2 television documentary, Asking For It?: Reality Bites, based on her second book, which aired on 1 November 2016. In the documentary O'Neill explored the issue of consent and tackling sexual assault and rape culture in Ireland.

Asking For It was adapted for stage by Landmark Productions. It premiered at the Cork Midsummer Festival 2018 before running at Dublin's Abbey Theatre.

O’Neill's third novel, Almost Love, was published in March 2018 by Riverrun. The Surface Breaks, a reimagining of The Little Mermaid, was published by Scholastic in May 2018.

In September 2026, she was a guest on the How to Fail Podcast, hosted by Elizabeth Day.

== Books ==
- Only Ever Yours (2014) - this novel, set in a dystopian world where only boys are born naturally, follows the lives of two girls (created in laboratories) who must fight for the honor of being selected as a "companion" (wife).
- Asking For It (2015) - the story of Emma, an eighteen-year student in rural Ireland who is raped. The novel deals with the fallout of this event as it impacts both, her family life, and relationships with her friends.
- Almost Love (2018) - structured into two sections, "Now" and "Then", which take place in reverse chronological order, the plot of this novel revolves around Sarah, a woman in her late twenties who finds herself teaching at a prestigious Dublin school instead of pursuing her art. Sarah struggles with dissatisfaction towards her relationship with her boyfriend, her friends and her past.
- The Surface Breaks (2018) - a feminist reimagining of The Little Mermaid by Hans Christian Andersen. In this re-telling, the mermaid (Gaia) struggles to break free from her oppressive father in order to find her place in the world.
- Idol (2022).

== Awards ==
On 19 November 2021, Louise O'Neill was conferred with an Honorary Doctorate in Law (L.L.D) from University College Cork (UCC) in recognition of her work's role in bringing problematic issues to the fore in contemporary discourse. Current UCC President Prof. John O'Halloran remarked:

"I am delighted that Louise O'Neill is the recipient of an Honorary Doctorate in our final November conferring ceremonies. Louise's seminal work has held a mirror up to Irish society, and forced us to confront uncomfortable truths about our culture that were all-pervasive, but of which we rarely speak. While her skill is in writing on complex and challenging issues in a manner that engages, and not patronises, young audiences, her work transcends age categorisations and carries valuable lessons for us all."
