= Robert North (choreographer) =

American choreographer (born 1945)

Robert North (born 1 June 1945) is an American dancer and choreographer with extensive works in ballet and modern dance. He studied at the Royal Ballet School and the London School of Contemporary Dance. His early career was mainly with London Contemporary Dance Theatre, of which he was a founding member, and Ballet Rambert, where he was artistic director from 1981 to 1986. He later directed for Teatro Regio in Italy, Gothenburg Ballet in Sweden, Corpo di Ballo dell'Arena di Verona in Italy, Scottish Ballet, and Theater Krefeld und Mönchengladbach in Germany. Among his most popular works is the 1974 modern dance work Troy Game.
