= Asking for It (novel) =

2015 Irish novel

- First edition
- Author: Louise O’Neill
- Publisher: Quercus
- Publication place: Ireland
- ISBN: 978 1 78429 586 8

Asking for It is a book by Irish author Louise O’Neill that was released in 2015. It won the Bord Gáis Energy Book of the Year award.

It has since been adapted into a play, which in 2018 won the Audience Choice award at the Irish Times Irish Theatre awards.

== Premise ==
When Emma, a popular girl and the queen bee of her secondary school—a character whom O’Neill deliberately portrays as dislikable—is raped by several boys from her hometown, she finds the world she has built crumbling around her as the town turns against her.

== Critical response ==
Giulia Mastrontoni has said that novels such as Asking for It present an opportunity to introduce conversations about rape to second level school students. Though this can present issues, Mastrontoni contends thats conversations focused around novels with a sound criminological approach, such as Asking for It, would allow students to "better understand the insidious implications of rape representations, and […] to question their standpoint on rape in a safe, educational environment."
