= Aftersun =

2022 film by Charlotte Wells

- Release poster
- Directed by: Charlotte Wells
- Written by: Charlotte Wells
- Produced by: Adele Romanski; Amy Jackson; Barry Jenkins; Mark Ceryak
- Starring: Paul Mescal; Frankie Corio; Celia Rowlson-Hall
- Cinematography: Gregory Oke
- Edited by: Blair McClendon
- Music by: Oliver Coates
- Production companies: BBC Film; Screen Scotland; Tango; BFI; Pastel; Unified Theory
- Distributed by: Mubi (United Kingdom); A24 (United States)
- Release dates: 21 May 2022 (Cannes); 21 October 2022 (United States); 18 November 2022 (United Kingdom)
- Running time: 101 minutes
- Countries: United Kingdom; United States
- Language: English
- Box office: $9.7 million

Aftersun is a 2022 independent semi-autobiographical coming-of-age drama film written and directed by Charlotte Wells in her feature directorial debut. Starring Paul Mescal, Frankie Corio, and Celia Rowlson-Hall, the film is loosely based on Wells' childhood and follows an 11-year-old Scottish girl on holiday with her father at a Turkish resort on the eve of his 31st birthday.

Aftersun had its world premiere at the Cannes Film Festival on 21 May 2022, where Wells was nominated for the Caméra d'Or. It was theatrically released in the United States on 21 October and in the United Kingdom on 18 November. The film received widespread acclaim from critics, who praised the direction, screenplay, cinematography, visuals, and performances of Corio and Mescal.

Aftersun received four nominations at the 76th BAFTA Awards, where Wells won for Outstanding Debut by a British Writer, Director or Producer. Mescal was nominated as Best Actor at the 95th Academy Awards, in addition to receiving BAFTA nomination in the same category. The National Board of Review named Aftersun one of the best films of 2022 and Sight and Sound ranked it first on its list of the best films of 2022. Since then, it has been cited as among the best films of the 2020s and the 21st century.

== Plot ==
In 1999, Scottish 11-year-old Sophie Patterson travels to a Turkish holiday resort with her 30-year-old father, Calum, who moved to London after separating amicably from her mother. Sophie records the holiday on a MiniDV camera, the footage of which is interspersed throughout the film. Over the course of the holiday, Sophie befriends and observes various other teenage British tourists at the resort, including meeting and playing arcade games with a boy named Michael. Calum exhibits signs of depression and internal turmoil, which he tries to hide from Sophie beneath a facade of contentment. During his time alone, he practices tai chi and reads self-help books; he also hides his smoking from Sophie.

One day, Sophie and Calum go scuba diving. Sophie loses her expensive scuba mask; her father feigns nonchalance, but she senses his actual feelings and comforts him. Calum later tells their diving instructor that he is surprised he has lived to be 30. Soon after, the two go to a rug shop, where she sees him grapple with the cost of one he likes. He declines to buy the rug, but later returns alone to do so.

The next night, Sophie and Calum attend a karaoke night during which the former signs them up for a song. Calum refuses to sing with Sophie despite her insistence; Sophie sings "Losing My Religion" alone as he watches. Upset at being left alone by him, Sophie refuses to return to their room and hangs out with tourists she had previously met playing pool. Michael creeps up on Sophie from behind, frightening her. They later kiss beside a pool. Meanwhile, Calum walks into the nearby ocean. When Sophie returns to their room, she finds him asleep naked and gently covers him with a sheet.

The two reconcile the next day while travelling to the mud baths and Calum apologises for his behaviour the previous night. Sophie surprises him by having other tourists sing "For He's a Jolly Good Fellow" for his 31st birthday. Calum watches stoically before later sobbing in the hotel room alone; on the floor is a postcard addressed to Sophie that tells her to never forget that he loves her. On the last night of their holiday, Calum and Sophie dance to "Under Pressure" in a loving embrace. At the airport the next morning, Calum waves goodbye and sends Sophie off on her flight home. In the present day, the adult Sophie lives in New York City with her wife and young child. The rug Calum bought, worn with use, lies on their bedroom floor. Sophie watches the MiniDV footage from Turkey.

Interspersed throughout the film are abstract, dreamlike sequences in which the adult Sophie stands in the middle of a crowded rave, catching glimpses of Calum dancing emotionally through strobing lights. Throughout the sequences, Sophie attempts to get closer to him, eventually briefly embracing him; with their hands wrapped around each other, Calum ultimately falls from Sophie's grasp. In the final scene, Calum packs the camcorder away and walks down the airport hallway after having waved goodbye to Sophie, opening the doors to the rave.

== Cast ==
- Paul Mescal as Calum Patterson
- Frankie Corio as Sophie Patterson
- Celia Rowlson-Hall as adult Sophie
- Brooklyn Toulson as Michael
- Sally Messham as Belinda
- Spike Fearn as Olly
- Harry Perdios as Toby
- Ruby Thompson as Laura
- Ethan James Smith as Scott
- Kayleigh Coleman as Jane

== Production ==
Aftersun is director and writer Charlotte Wells' feature film debut. Calling it "emotionally autobiographical", she sought to delve into "a different period" in a relationship between a young parent and a daughter than what she explored in her 2015 debut short film Tuesday. Frankie Corio was one of over 800 applicants before being cast. Filming took place in Ölüdeniz, Turkey. During the two-week rehearsal period Corio and Mescal spent time at a holiday resort in order to make their dynamic more authentic.

In 2025, Charlotte Wells spoke about the production of Aftersun and her collaboration with Mescal, calling their partnership "the start of a potential De Niro–Scorsese relationship". She discussed the film's continued resonance while serving on the Bright Horizons jury at the Melbourne International Film Festival and the Venice Film Festival, where she chaired the Luigi De Laurentiis Award jury.

== Music ==
=== Soundtrack ===
Featured songs
No.	Title	Artist(s)	Length
1.	"High Hopes"	Mac Prindy	3:02
2.	"Lucky You"	The Lightning Seeds	3:53
3.	"Macarena (Bayside Boys Remix)"	Los del Río	4:12
4.	"My Oh My"	Aqua	3:24
5.	"Road Rage"	Catatonia	5:09
6.	"Tender"	Blur	7:40
7.	"Drinking in L.A."	Bran van 3000	3:56
8.	"Real Gone Kid"	Deacon Blue	4:03
9.	"5,6,7,8"	Steps	3:22
10.	"Losing My Religion"	R.E.M.	4:28
11.	"Unchained Melody"	The Righteous Brothers	3:37
12.	"Tubthumping"	Chumbawamba	4:38
13.	"The Tide is High"	The Paragons	2:43
14.	"Never Ever"	All Saints	6:29
15.	"Gamsız Hayat"	Candan Erçetin	3:50
16.	"Under Pressure"	Queen and David Bowie	4:08

=== Score ===
Oliver Coates wrote and composed the film's original score. The score was released as Aftersun (Original Motion Picture Soundtrack) by Invada Records and Lakeshore Records on January 13, 2023. The released score contains the following tracks:

No.	Title	Length
1.	"Memory Opening"	1:21
2.	"One Without"	4:03
3.	"Bus"	2:04
4.	"DVCAM"	1:27
5.	"Swimming Pool - Sky"	2:56
6.	"Boat"	1:36
7.	"Ocean>Rave"	2:14
8.	"Gliders Peace of Mind"	2:58
9.	"Tai Chi"	3:00
10.	"Sophie Pool With the Guys"	2:10
11.	"Night"	4:28
12.	"Limit"	4:04
13.	"Happy Birthday Sophie"	2:23
14.	"Last Dance (Score)"	2:39
Total length:		37:23

"One Without" is used during the film's final scene and credits and was described by Pitchfork as a key cue in the film.

== Release and reception ==
The film premiered as part of Critics' Week during the 2022 Cannes Film Festival, where it won a jury prize. It screened at the Edinburgh International Film Festival, the Melbourne International Film Festival, the Telluride Film Festival, the Toronto International Film Festival, the BFI London Film Festival, the New York Film Festival, the New Hampshire Film Festival, the Adelaide Film Festival, and the Athens International Film Festival.

Aftersun was distributed in Austria, France, Germany, India, Ireland, Italy, Latin America, Spain, Turkey and the United Kingdom by Mubi and in the United States and Canada by A24. It was released in the United States on 21 October 2022 and in the United Kingdom on 18 November. The film was released for video on demand in the United States on 20 December and was made available to stream on Mubi on 5 January 2023 in countries where Mubi distributes the film.

=== Critical response ===
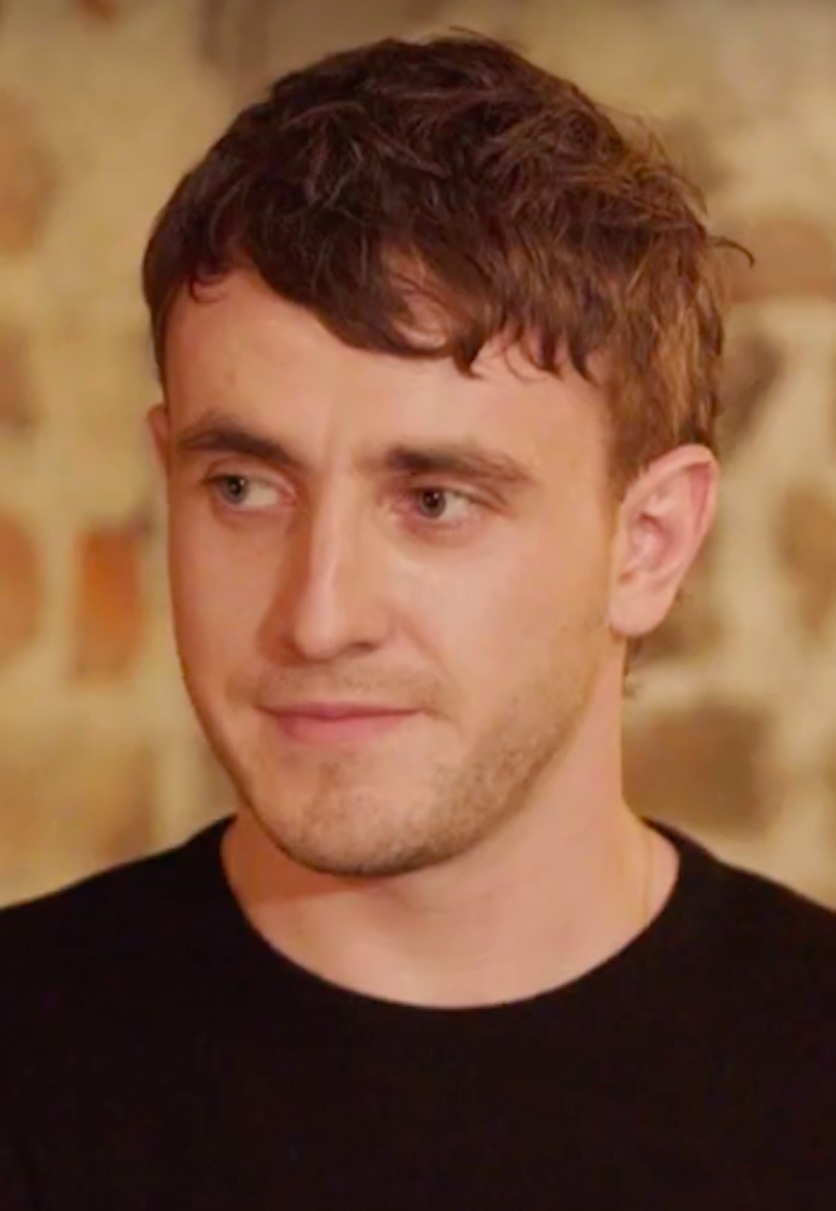
Paul Mescal garnered critical acclaim for his performance and earned Oscar and BAFTA nominations for Best Lead Actor.

On Rotten Tomatoes, Aftersun holds an approval rating of 96% based on 245 reviews, with an average rating of 8.8/10. The website's critics consensus reads, "Led by Frankie Corio's tremendous performance, Aftersun deftly ushers audiences to the intersection between our memories of loved ones and who they really are." Metacritic assigned the film a weighted average score of 95 out of 100 based on 46 critics, indicating "universal acclaim".

The New York Times critic A.O. Scott called the film "astonishing and devastating", writing that Wells was "very nearly reinventing the language of film, unlocking the medium's often dormant potential to disclose inner worlds of consciousness and feeling." Screen Daily's Fionnuala Halligan wrote that Wells' "measured but relentless probing ... mark her out as one of the most promising new voices in British cinema in recent years". Guy Lodge of Variety called the film "sensuous, sharply moving". Carlos Aguilar of TheWrap praised Gregory Oke's "visually fluid" cinematography, saying it "evokes a radiant melancholia". In Empire, Beth Webb called the film a "deftly orchestrated, empathetic and honest character study" and "A triumph of new British filmmaking." In 2023, filmmaker Claire Denis said: "Never before have I felt the power of a point of view that immerses us into gazes that dare to secretly spar in front of the lens of a small videocamera. We are pulled in by the characters' words too, which comprise a kind of game that slowly reveals the father to his almost adolescent daughter." In 2024, filmmaker Christopher Nolan said Aftersun was one of his favorite films, calling it "just a beautiful film". In 2025, actors Vicky Krieps, Dolly de Leon and Stephen Merchant, composer Carter Burwell, and filmmakers Sofia Coppola and Joachim Trier listed Aftersun among their favorite films of the 21st century.

Several critics have pointed out the film's resonances with the work of Margaret Tait; as Mark Kermode of The Guardian writes, "There are also clear traces of the films of Margaret Tait in Wells's craft, specifically Blue Black Permanent (1992), which seems to have served as a tonal reference (a volume of Tait's writings is prominently displayed on screen)." In an interview, Wells acknowledged Tait's impact on her, particularly Blue Black Permanent, saying, "It's a special film and it relates in many ways to what I was doing". A copy of Tait's Poems, Stories and Writings lies between a tai chi manual and a self-help book in Calum's pile of holiday readings. Pat Brown of Slant Magazine called the film's "Under Pressure" sequence one of the best movie scenes of 2022, saying that it "brings to the surface what was kept simmering throughout: the searing pain of loss that's led Sophie to reflect on the past."

In 2024, Collider ranked the film sixth on its list of the "30 Best Movies of the 2020s (So Far)," with Jeremy Urquhart calling it "a film about growing up and reinterpreting who your parents are or were, as people, once you're old enough to see the world how they might've seen it when you were just a kid. Any descriptions of what Aftersun is about—or what emotions it inspires—ultimately undersell it. One really has to watch it and engage with it to feel and understand exactly what it's going for." Business Insider included it on its list of the "25 Best British Movies of the Last Ten Years". IndieWire ranked a line spoken by Sophie ("I think it’s nice that we share the same sky") 10th on its list of the "22 Best Movie Quotes of 2022". The site also ranked the film third on its list of "The 100 Best Movies of the 2020s (So Far)" in June 2025. In 2025, Aftersun ranked 78th on The New York Times's list of the "100 Best Movies of the 21st Century" and 35th on the "Readers' Choice" edition of the list.
