= Neal Street Productions =

British film, television and theatre production company

- Type: Subsidiary
- Industry: Film; Television; Theatre
- Founded: 2003; 23 years ago
- Founders: Sam Mendes; Pippa Harris; Caro Newling
- Headquarters: Covent Garden, London, UK
- Key people: Nicolas Brown; Sam Mendes; Pippa Harris; Caro Newling
- Parent: All3Media (2015–2026); Banijay UK (2026–present)
- Website: nealstreetproductions.com

Neal Street Productions is a British film, television and theatre production company founded by Sam Mendes, Pippa Harris and Caro Newling in 2003.

== History ==
The company was set up in 2003 by Sam Mendes, Pippa Harris and Caro Newling. Its offices are located in a converted warehouse on Neal Street in Covent Garden, London. Nicolas Brown joined in 2013 to work across the film and TV portfolio. The company's movies include Revolutionary Road, Jarhead and Starter for 10. Their TV dramas include the award-winning Stuart: A Life Backwards with Tom Hardy and Benedict Cumberbatch, Penny Dreadful and Call the Midwife. In theatre Neal Street has produced The Bridge Project, Shrek The Musical and the musical adaptation of Charlie and the Chocolate Factory. More recently in 2017/8, Neal Street has produced The Ferryman written by Jez Butterworth, directed by Sam Mendes. Also written by Jez Butterworth, Neal Street produced Britannia which was the first co-production between Sky and Amazon Prime Video in 2018, starring Kelly Reilly, David Morrissey, Zoë Wanamaker, Liana Cornell and Stanley Weber.

Call the Midwife’s fourth series averaged over 11 million (UK) viewers and during its run was the UK's most watched TV programme, the 2017 Christmas Special was BBC One's highest viewed programme on Christmas Day. Penny Dreadful was written by John Logan and starred Josh Hartnett, Eva Green, Timothy Dalton and Rory Kinnear. The Hollow Crown is a series of Shakespeare films for the BBC/PBS, starring Ben Whishaw, Tom Hiddleston, Jeremy Irons, Benedict Cumberbatch, Judi Dench, Hugh Bonneville, Keeley Hawes and Sophie Okonedo. Neal Street are developing the live-action adaptation of Enid Blyton's book series The Magic Faraway Tree, alongside StudioCanal.

In 2015, the company was acquired by All3Media.

== Productions ==
=== Television ===
- Stuart: A Life Backwards (2007)
- The Hollow Crown
  - Richard II (2012)
  - Henry IV (Parts 1 and 2) (2012)
  - Henry V (2012)
- Call the Midwife (2012–present)
- Penny Dreadful (2014–16)
  - Penny Dreadful: City of Angels (2020)
- Britannia (2018–21)
- Informer (2018)
- The Franchise (2024)
- The Magnus (Unreleased)

=== Film ===
- Jarhead (2005)
- Starter for 10 (2006)
- Things We Lost in the Fire (2007)
- Revolutionary Road (2008)
- Away We Go (2009)
- 1917 (2019)
- Empire of Light (2022)
- Hamnet (2025)
- The Magic Faraway Tree (2026)
- The Beatles – A Four-Film Cinematic Event (Note: Including Untitled Paul McCartney film, Untitled John Lennon film, Untitled George Harrison film and Untitled Ringo Starr film) (2028)

=== Theatre ===
- The Hound of the Baskervilles (West Yorkshire Playhouse, 2007)
- Shrek the Musical (Broadway/West End/Touring, 2008–)
- The House of Special Purpose (Chichester Festival Theatre, 2009)
- Mary Stewart on Broadway (Shubert Theatre, 2009)
- The Bridge Project
- Charlie and the Chocolate Factory (West End/Broadway/Touring, 2013–, co-production with Warner Bros. Theater Ventures)
- The Ferryman (Royal Court Theatre, 2017, co-production with Sonia Friedman)
