= 3 Savile Row =

18th-century townhouse in Mayfair, London, England

Coordinates: 51°30′38″N 0°08′23″W

3 Savile Row in 2024

Plaque on No. 3 marking the Beatles's last live performance

3 Savile Row is an 18th-century townhouse on Savile Row in the Mayfair district of West London. It has been notable since the late 1960s as the headquarters of Apple Corps, the multimedia corporation owned by The Beatles. It was the site of the band's rooftop concert, their final live performance, on 30 January 1969. It is currently being renovated to reopen as an exhibition about the band called "The Beatles at 3 Savile Row", subject to planning consent being granted.

== Description ==
The building was built as a terraced townhouse in c.1733. It has 4 storeys and a basement. The interior retains fine panelling and plasterwork. The original staircase has been lost. It has been listed Grade II* on the National Heritage List for England since September 1958.

== History ==
It was built as part of the Burlington Estate in c.1733. Beauchamp Seymour, 1st Baron Alcester was resident at No 3. in the 1890s. Montague Guest wrote to The Times from the house in 1885 on the condition of the deteriorating Wellington Monument. Lady Irene Congrave gave birth to her son at No. 3 in 1907. The women's rights activist Maud Palmer, Countess of Selborne wrote to The Times on the subject of women's suffrage in June 1912. The will of Lady Layard, the wife of Austen Henry Layard included No.3 and the Palazzo Cappello Layard in Venice as her properties. The freehold of No.3 was put up for auction in April 1913 by Elliot, Son and Boynton. It was listed as having a total area of 4,200 ft. The antiques dealer Basil Dighton exhibited his 18th-century French line engravings at the house in December 1913. Dighton's exhibition was visited by Queen Mary, Edward, Prince of Wales, Princess Mary, and Princess Henry of Battenberg on 23 December. A memorial plaque for the Jane Austen's House Museum in Hampshire, to mark the centenary of her birth, was displayed at the house for three weeks in July 1917. The Queen and Princess Mary visited the gallery for a second time to see old English coloured engravings in July 1918. Portraits in pencil by Violet Manners, Duchess of Rutland were displayed by Dighton in July 1924. Almacks Club moved to No. 3 in 1936.

=== The Beatles ===
In July 1968, the Beatles moved Apple Corps, their multimedia corporation, into 3 Savile Row. Apple purchased the building on 22 June for £500,000 (equivalent to £4,600,000 in 2025). A studio was built in the basement; though it was poorly designed, the Beatles recorded Let It Be there before a new studio was constructed in 1971 at an estimated cost of $1.5 million. Various artists, including Badfinger, Mary Hopkin, and Marc Bolan recorded in the basement studio until it closed in May 1975. The Beatles' final live performance, known as the "rooftop concert", was held on the roof of the building, on 30 January 1969, and was recorded for the documentary film Let It Be; the last words of the band, spoken by John Lennon as the police stopped the performance, were "I hope we passed the audition." By 1983 Richard Williams wrote in The Times that No.3 had become "a shrine". In May 2026, Apple Corps announced that the building is set to be reopened as an exhibition space, which will be opened to the public in 2027.
