= The Doctor (play) =

2019 West End play by Robert Icke

- Written by: Robert Icke

Premiere
- Date: 10 August 2019
- Place: Almeida Theatre

The Doctor is a 2019 play by Robert Icke. It is a reimagining of the 1912 play Professor Bernhardi by Arthur Schnitzler.

== Plot ==
The play follows Professor Ruth Wolff, the Founding Director of the Elizabeth Institute, who refuses to let a Catholic priest into the operating room where a girl is dying from a botched self-administered abortion. After a recording of the physical altercation with the priest goes viral on the internet, Ruth begins to receive severe backlash from some of the hospital staff, the girl’s father, a network of social media users, and eventually, a TV panel of social activist groups. Each of the panellists question Ruth’s intention for prohibiting the priest’s entrance, who is later revealed to be a Black man, and criticize her refusal to identify with labels. The Doctor explores themes of identity, race, privilege, religion, mental health, and sexuality. In the original production, nontraditional casting methods were employed, such as color-conscious casting, to manipulate the audience’s expectations and internal biases towards identity groups.

== Production history ==
=== Almeida Theatre ===
The production premiered at the Almeida Theatre on August 10, 2019. It was created and directed by Robert Icke, designed by Hildegard Bechtler, lighting was designed by Natasha Chivers and sound by Tom Gibbons. It was Icke's final production as the Associate Director of the Almeida. It is an adaptation of Viennese dramatist Arthur Schnitzler's 1912 play Professor Bernhardi.

English actress Juliet Stevenson's performance as Dr. Ruth Wolff in The Doctor received critical praise. Stevenson won the 2019 Critics’ Circle Theatre Award for Best Actress, and was nominated for both the Laurence Olivier Award and the Evening Standard Award for Best Actress. Robert Icke won the Evening Standard Award for Best Director. Live music was provided by drummer Hannah Ledwidge to underscore the tension and pacing within each scene.

=== Adelaide Festival ===
The play headlined the Adelaide Festival in early 2020, completing its run narrowly before the coronavirus pandemic closed theatres worldwide.

=== UK Tour/West End ===
The Adelaide Festival cast had been contracted to play a run in the West End starting in April 2020, but this was postponed due to the coronavirus pandemic. The play toured from 5 September 2022 and opened on 29 September 2022 at the Duke of York's Theatre in London.

=== European transfers ===
In 2021, the same creative team premiered a Dutch-language version at Internationaal Theater Amsterdam, in a translation by Aus Greidanus Jr and starring the actors of the ITA ensemble.

A German-language version in a translation by Christina Schlögl opened at the Burgtheater in Vienna on 7 January 2022, bringing the play full circle to the city where its source play, Professor Bernhardi, was originally composed.

== Critical reception ==
On its premiere in London, The Doctor met with positive reviews. Michael Billington of The Guardian awarded the play five stars, and praised its handling of themes like identity politics and medical ethics. In another five-star review, Fiona Mountford of The Telegraph described it as: "thrilling series of games of theatricality and rugpulling in which nothing is quite what – or who – it seems. We are, the play says from its slickly impersonal set on a slow revolve, far more complex than a series of simplistic labels." Writing for The New York Times, Matt Wolf gave a more mixed review, saying that the play "may not quite reach the heights" of Icke's previous work, and that "[y]ou might argue that Mr. Icke takes on more themes than he can handle." Aleks Sierz praised the play's pacing, acting and dialogue, which he described as "moving as well as energizing."

It was nominated for the Laurence Olivier Award for Best New Play, in addition to Stevenson's Best Actress nomination.

== Characters and cast ==
Character	Original Cast 2019	Adelaide Festival 2020	ITA 2021	Vienna 2022	West End 2022	New York 2023
Ruth Wolff	Juliet Stevenson	Juliet Stevenson	Janni Goslinga	Sophie von Kessel	Juliet Stevenson	Juliet Stevenson
Sami	Ria Zmitrowicz	Liv Hill	Ilke Paddenburg	Maresi Riegner	Matilda Tucker	Matilda Tucker
Father	Paul Higgins	Jamie Parker	Bart Slegers	Philipp Hauss	John Mackay	John Mackay
Charlie	Joy Richardson	Joy Richardson	Nadia Amin	Sandra Selimovic	Juliet Garricks	Juliet Garricks
Michael Copley	Oliver Alvin Wilson	Chris Colquhoun	Joy Delima	Bless Amada	Chris Colquhoun	Chris Colquhoun
Paul Murphy	Daniel Rabin	Daniel Rabin	Aus Greidanus jr.	Gunther Eckes	Daniel Rabin	Daniel Rabin
Roger Hardiman	Naomi Wirthner	Naomi Wirthner	Maria Kraakman	Zeynep Buyraç	Naomi Wirthner	Naomi Wirthner
Jemima Flint	Nathalie Armin	Shelly Conn	Dewi Reijs	Stacyian Jackson	Preeya Kalidas	Preeya Kalidas
Brian Cyprian	Pamela Nomvete	Anni Domingo	Farida van den Stoom	Ernest Allan Hausmann	Doña Croll	Doña Croll
Junior Doctor	Kirsty Rider	Millicent Wong	Sam Ghilane	Safira Robens	Sabrina Wu	Jaime Schwarz
Rebecca Roberts	Mariah Louca	Mariah Louca	Iris Amber Stenger	Bardo Böhlefeld	Mariah Louca	Mariah Louca

== Awards and nominations ==
=== 2019 West End production ===
Year	Award	Category	Nominee	Result	Ref.
2019	Evening Standard Theatre Awards	Best Director	Robert Icke	Won	
2019	Evening Standard Theatre Awards	Best Actress	Juliet Stevenson	Nominated	
2019	Critics Circle Theatre Awards	Best Actress	Juliet Stevenson	Won	
2020	Laurence Olivier Awards	Best New Play	Robert Icke	Nominated	
2020	Laurence Olivier Awards	Best Actress	Juliet Stevenson	Nominated	

=== 2022 Netherlands Production ===
Year	Award	Category	Nominee	Result	Ref.
2022	VSCD Toneelprijzen	Theo D'Or	Janni Goslinga	Nominated	
2022	VSCD Toneelprijzen	Colombina	Ilke Paddenburg	Nominated	

=== 2023 Off-Broadway production ===
Year	Award	Category	Nominee	Result	Ref.
2023	Drama Desk Awards	Outstanding Lead Performance in a Play	Juliet Stevenson	Nominated	
2023	Drama Desk Awards	Best Adaptation	Robert Icke	Nominated	
