= 1984 (play) =

2013 play by Robert Icke and Duncan Macmillan

- Written by: Robert Icke, Duncan Macmillan (play)
- Based on: Nineteen Eighty-Four by George Orwell

Premiere
- Date: 13 September 2013
- Place: Nottingham Playhouse

1984 is a 2013 play by Robert Icke and Duncan Macmillan based on the 1949 novel Nineteen Eighty-Four by George Orwell.

== Production history ==
The production premiered at the Nottingham Playhouse on Friday 13 September 2013 in a co-production with Headlong. It was created and directed by Robert Icke and Duncan Macmillan, designed by Chloe Lamford, lighting was designed by Natasha Chivers, sound by Tom Gibbons, and video by Tim Reid.

Following a UK tour, the production transferred to the Almeida Theatre in Islington from 8 February to 29 March 2014 where it later transferred to London's West End to the Playhouse Theatre from 28 April to 23 August 2014 where it was co-produced by the Almeida Theatre and Sonia Friedman Productions. The production was nominated for Best New Play at the 2014 Laurence Olivier Awards but lost to Chimerica, another Almeida Theatre production. This was followed by another UK tour.

In 2015 the production returned to the Playhouse Theatre in the West End from 12 June to 5 September. Following the 2015 West End run, the production toured Nottingham and Bath before travelling to Melbourne in Australia and Santa Monica, Boston, and Washington, D.C. in the United States.

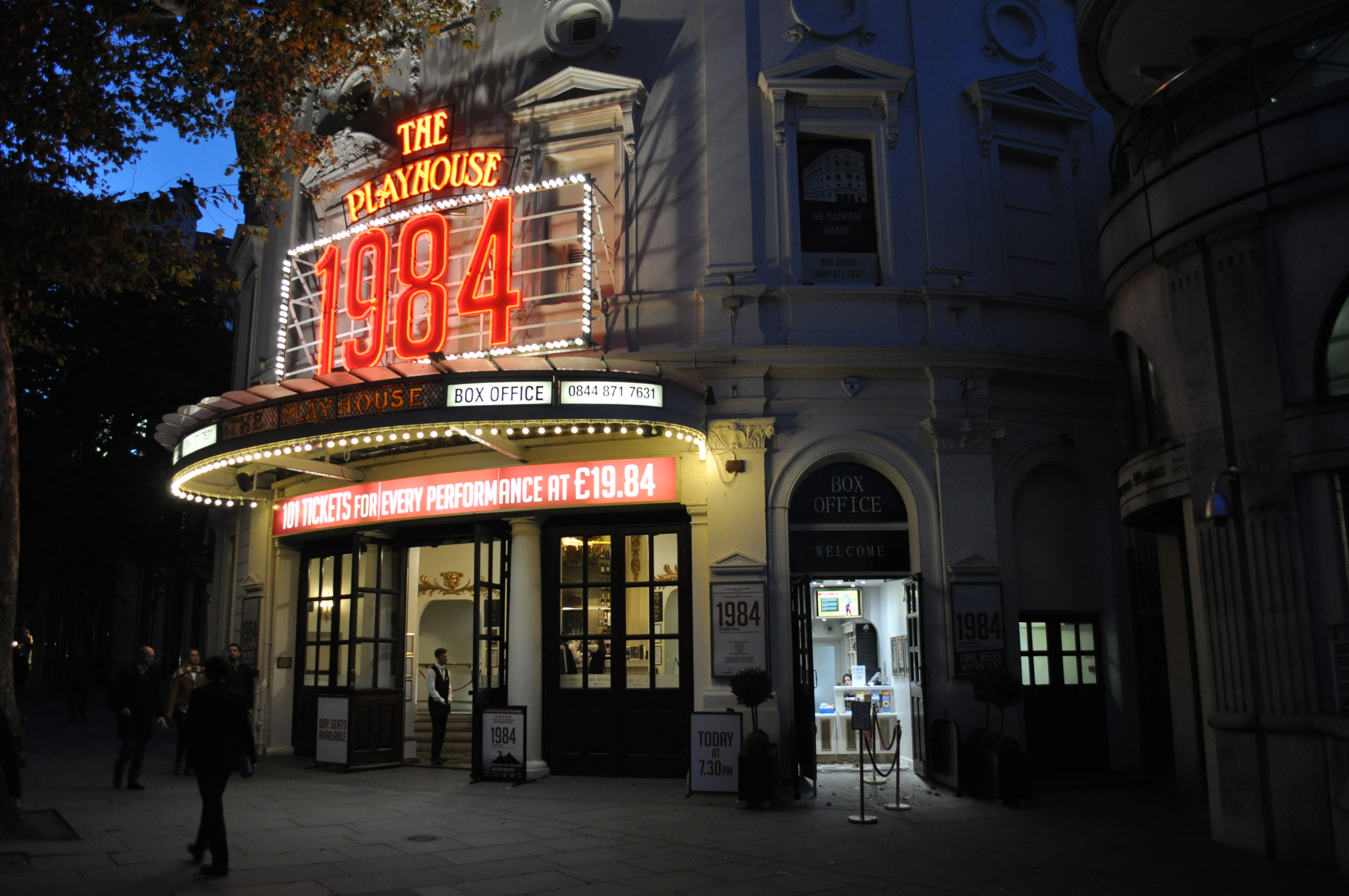
2016 production of 1984 at the Playhouse Theatre in the West End

In 2016 the production returned for a third time to the Playhouse Theatre in the West End from 14 June to 29 October.

In 2017, Icke and Macmillan released a US edition of the play, and directed a new American cast for the play's opening on Broadway. The Broadway production opened at the Hudson Theatre on June 22 (previews beginning May 18) for a limited run until October 8, starring Tom Sturridge, Olivia Wilde and Reed Birney.

Due to audience reactions to the shocking content, security guards were placed within the Hudson Theatre.

Before opening night of the show, those under the age of 13 were barred from attending, after actors had spotted a small child in the audience.

In 2017, a version of the production played on an Australian tour, playing in Adelaide, Melbourne, Brisbane, Sydney, Canberra, and Perth, from 13 May through to 13 August.

== Extreme content and audience reactions ==
The play includes extreme torture scenes. It also includes non-linear staging, strobe lights, sudden blackouts and jackhammer sounds. Due to the shocking nature of the play, some audience members reacted strongly, including leaving the show, fainting, screaming at cast members, and vomiting. Two audience members had police called on them after getting into a fight after the show. Among these audience members, actress Jennifer Lawrence was in attendance at a show before leaving and vomiting.

== Characters and cast ==
Character	Nottingham	West End	Broadway
Character	2013	2014	2017
Winston	Mark Arends	Sam Crane	Tom Sturridge
O'Brien	Tim Dutton	Tim Dutton	Reed Birney
Charrington	Stephen Fewell	Stephen Fewell	Michael Potts
Martin	Christopher Patrick Nolan	Christopher Patrick Nolan	Carl Hendrick Louis
Syme	Matthew Spencer	Matthew Spencer	Nick Mills
Parsons	Gavin Spokes	Simon Coates	Wayne Duvall
Mrs Parsons	Mandi Symonds	Mandi Symonds	Cara Seymour
Julia	Hara Yannas	Hara Yannas	Olivia Wilde
The Child	Jemima Wright	Harriet Turnbull	Sami Bray

== Awards and nominations ==
Original Production Awards

- Winner — 2014 UK Theatre Awards Best Director — Duncan Macmillan and Robert Icke
- Winner — 2013 Liverpool Arts Awards Best Director — Duncan Macmillan and Robert Icke
- Winner — 2013 Liverpool Arts Awards Best Actor — Mark Arends
- Winner — Broadway World Awards Los Angeles Best Featured Actor — Tim Dutton

=== Original Broadway production ===
Year	Award Ceremony	Category	Nominee	Result
2018	Tony Award	Best Sound Design of a Play	Tom Gibbons	Nominated
2018	Drama Desk Award	Outstanding Sound Design in a Play	Tom Gibbons	Nominated
2018	Drama Desk Award	Outstanding Lighting Design in a Play	Natasha Chivers	Nominated
2018	Outer Critics Circle Award	Outstanding Projection Design (Play or Musical)	Tim Reid	Nominated
