= Duncan Macmillan (playwright) =

English playwright and theatre director (born 1980)

- Born: 1980 (age 45–46); England
- Occupations: Playwright; theatre director
- Notable work: Lungs; People, Places and Things; Every Brilliant Thing; 1984

Duncan Macmillan (born 1980) is an English playwright and theatre director. He is best known for his plays Lungs, People, Places and Things, Every Brilliant Thing, and the stage adaptation of the George Orwell novel Nineteen Eighty-Four, which he co-adapted and co-directed with Robert Icke.

Macmillan's play Lungs had a major revival at the Old Vic theatre in 2019, starring Matt Smith and Claire Foy.

Macmillan co-created and wrote the 2020 BBC television drama series Trigonometry with Effie Woods.

== Biography ==
Macmillan first rose to prominence through the Bruntwood Playwriting Competition at Manchester's Royal Exchange Theatre, winning two awards in its inaugural year for his play Monster, which was also nominated for a TMA Best New Play Award and a Manchester Evening News Best New Play Award.

=== Major plays ===
Many of Macmillan's major plays take as their central theme a contemporary socio-political issue: Lungs explores parenthood, People, Places and Things addiction and recovery, and Every Brilliant Thing considers the issue of suicidality.

==== Lungs ====
His play Lungs was first produced at the Studio Theatre in Washington DC and has subsequently been performed around the world, receiving its German-language premiere as 'Atmen' at the Schaubühne where it entered the repertory, directed by Katie Mitchell. Lungs has also premiered in South Africa as "Longe" in 2016 at the Vrystaat Kunstefees, winning the award for Best Upcoming Talent. The British production of the play, starring Kate O'Flynn and Alistair Cope under the direction of Richard Wilson received the 2013 Offiefor Best New Play.

==== People, Places and Things ====
Macmillan's play People, Places and Things opened at the National Theatre in a co-production with Headlong Theatre Company in 2015 and was nominated for Best New Play at the Olivier Awards. It transferred to the Wyndham's Theatre in London's West End in 2016 and will transfer to St Ann's Warehouse in New York in 2017. It was directed by Jeremy Herrin and starred Denise Gough, who won the Olivier Award for Best Actress for her performance in 2016.

The play is a harrowing look at drug and alcohol addiction and recovery. Its writing was prompted by Macmillan's desire to write a leading part for an actress: he has said he "wrote this play believing very strongly that there were a lot of brilliant actresses who just weren't getting parts that would push them and that they could excel in." Gough's performance met with widespread critical acclaim.

==== Every Brilliant Thing ====
Every Brilliant Thing was produced by Paines Plough and Pentabus, enjoyed sold-out runs at three consecutive Edinburgh Festivals and continues to tour worldwide. During its 2014–2015 run at the Barrow Street Theatre in New York, it was filmed for broadcast on HBO (first aired in 2016). It is an interactive monologue, performed with audience participation. Its original performer was the comedian Jonny Donahoe. The Barrow Street production was a New York Times "Critic's Pick". A revival of Every Brilliant Thing, featuring Lenny Henry, Jonny Donahoe, Ambika Mod, Sue Perkins, and Minnie Driver, played at @sohoplace in London's West End from August 1 until November 8, 2025, and was directed by Macmillan. A transfer of the West End production of Every Brilliant Thing, featuring Daniel Radcliffe, opened at Broadway's Hudson Theatre in March 2026. Radcliffe performed through the end of May followed by Mariska Hargitay through early July and closing with Tracee Ellis Ross.

Macmillan has described his reason for writing the play as a desire to communicate to people "You're not alone, you're not weird, you will get through it, and you've just got to hold on. That's a very uncool, unfashionable thing for someone to say, but I really mean it. I didn't see anyone discussing suicidal depression in a useful or interesting or accurate way."

==== 1984 ====
Macmillan co-adapted and co-directed with Robert Icke a theatrical version of George Orwell's book Nineteen Eighty-Four, a production that has toured the U.K. and Internationally, had three runs in the West End and played on Broadway in the summer of 2017. As co-director with Robert Icke, Macmillan was awarded a UK Theatre Best Director award.

==== Don Juan Comes Back from the War ====
Macmillan adapted Don Juan Comes Back from the War by Ödön von Horváth for the National Theatre Studio and Finborough Theatre in 2012. The production was directed by Andrea Ferran as part of the Leverhulme Emerging Directors Bursary and was nominated for four Offies.

==== Game of Thrones: The Mad King ====
Game of Thrones: The Mad King will be presented by the Royal Shakespeare Company and will premiere in summer 2026. It is a prequel written by Macmillan to George R. R. Martin's epic fantasy novel series A Song of Ice and Fire.

=== Collaboration with Katie Mitchell ===
British director Katie Mitchell has directed several of Macmillan's plays. Their collaborations include a play at the Royal Court Theatre titled 2071, which Macmillan later co-authored as a book on climate science with Professor Chris Rapley. Macmillan's play The Forbidden Zone premiered at the Salzburg Festival before entering the repertoire of the Schaubühne Berlin and transferring to London's Barbican Theatre.

Their collaborations have been invited to Theatertreffen, Festival D'Avignon and awarded the Nestroy Theatre Prize. They also collaborated on the film Unseen, produced by Warp and Film 4.

His collaboration with Mitchell led to his meeting Leo Warner, the video designer who directed Macmillan's adaptation of City of Glass in 2017.

=== Purpose and characteristics ===
Macmillan has said "Most of what I want to say isn’t particularly coherent; it’s about trying to find a form to articulate an anxiety or concern I have." "My plays all have some internal contradiction that I can’t resolve."
