= Robert Icke =

English playwright and theatre director (born 1986)

- Born: Robert William Icke; 29 November 1986 (age 39); Stockton-on-Tees, England, UK
- Education: Kings College, Cambridge (BA)
- Occupations: playwright, theatre director
- Website: Official website

Robert Icke FRSL (/aɪk/; born 29 November 1986) is an English playwright and theatre director. He has been referred to as the "great hope of British theatre."

He is best known for his plays Oedipus, The Doctor, and his modern adaptations of classic texts, including versions of Oresteia, Mary Stuart, and 1984, devised with Duncan Macmillan.

== Early life and education ==
Born in Stockton-on-Tees to a non-theatrical family, he was taken to see a production of Richard III starring Kenneth Branagh as a teenager, which inspired him to take up writing and directing. He set up a theatre company, Arden Theatre, and directed a series of shows at ARC Theatre & Arts Centre, Stockton-on-Tees between 2003 and 2008. These include several Shakespeare plays.

He studied at Ian Ramsey Church of England School in Stockton, where he achieved 13 A* grades at GCSE, before attending Queen Elizabeth Sixth Form College in Darlington. He read English at Kings College, Cambridge.

Mentored by Michael Grandage through his early career, he worked as an assistant and associate director to Thea Sharrock, Michael Attenborough and Trevor Nunn.

== Career ==
=== 2010-12, Headlong ===
In 2010, Icke replaced Ben Power as associate director at Headlong. His interview for the post involved him giving a critique of Enron. He directed touring productions of Romeo and Juliet, the first production of Boys by Ella Hickson and 1984, written and directed with Duncan Macmillan, which began at Nottingham Playhouse then toured in 2013 and after an extended further life, opened on Broadway in 2017.

=== 2013-19, Almeida Theatre ===
In 2013, Icke left Headlong to take up a post as associate director at the Almeida Theatre. His work there began with the Almeida transfer of his Headlong 1984 in early 2014, which transferred to the Playhouse Theatre in the West End later that year, before transferring to Broadway in 2017. In summer 2014, he directed the European premiere of Mr. Burns, a Post-Electric Play by Anne Washburn, which provoked a violently divided critical reaction. In early 2015, he directed Tobias Menzies in The Fever in a site-specific production in a hotel room in Mayfair.

In 2015, Icke wrote and directed a version of Oresteia at the Almeida, as the opening production of a season of Greek tragedy. A free adaptation of Aeschylus' original running at nearly four hours with three intermissions, Icke added a prologue to the Aeschylus text concerning the sacrifice of Iphigenia: a "70-minute prequel that dramatises both what led up to that sacrifice and the act itself", which critic Dominic Maxwell described as "a masterpiece".

Icke followed this in 2016 with his own adaptations of Uncle Vanya, starring Paul Rhys, and Mary Stuart, in which Juliet Stevenson and Lia Williams tossed a coin to alternate the two central roles of Mary Stuart and Elizabeth I. Mary Stuart transferred to the West End in 2018, opening to rave reviews.

Icke made his National Theatre debut with The Red Barn, starring Mark Strong and Elizabeth Debicki in 2016.

After several months of rumours, Andrew Scott played Hamlet in Icke's modern dress production at the Almeida in early 2017. The production, which presented a Scandi-noir surveillance state, received rave reviews and transferred to the Harold Pinter Theatre, produced by Sonia Friedman. Hamlet was filmed and broadcast on BBC Two on Easter Saturday 2018.

In summer 2019, Icke stepped down from his Almeida role after six years to focus on his freelance career. The Doctor, which premiered at the Almeida Theatre on August 10, 2019, was his final production as the associate director of the Almeida, and won the Evening Standard's Award for Best Director in 2019. It was pronounced 'the play of the decade' by The Times.

=== 2018-23, Internationaal Theater Amsterdam ===
Icke's text of his adaptations of 1984, Oresteia, Uncle Vanya, Mary Stuart, The Wild Duck and his 'performance text' of Hamlet are published by Oberon Books. In March 2019, Icke won the Kurt Hübner award for the German adaptation of Oresteia.

In 2018, Icke opened his new adaptation of Sophocles' Oedipus for Ivo van Hove's company Toneelgroep Amsterdam, starring Hans Kesting and Marieke Heebink. This production was selected for the Dutch Theatre Festival 2018 and was performed at the Edinburgh International Festival in 2019. Following this, his sequel to A Doll's House, Children of Nora, opened in Amsterdam in 2020.

In 2020, Icke was announced as the first Ibsen Artist in Residence at ITA, supported by the Philip Loubser Foundation, which committed him to making productions with the company from 2020 to 2022. In 2021, Icke's play The Doctor premiered at ITA to a positive reception, and in 2022, his new production Judas premiered with the company.

The New York transfers of Icke's Hamlet and Oresteia were dedicated to the memory of Peter Brook, with whom Icke had a close friendship. Brook also introduced Icke to Andrei Serban, who regularly directs productions of Icke's adaptations in Romania and Hungary.

=== 2024-present ===
Icke's compression of Henry IV, Parts 1 and 2 as Player Kings starring Sir Ian McKellen as Falstaff opened to strong reviews in London's West End in the Spring of 2024. His adaptation of Oedipus opened later the same year at Wyndham's Theatre, starring Mark Strong and Lesley Manville, to rave reviews. It is slated for a Broadway transfer in 2025.

In early 2025, Icke's controversial play, Manhunt, dealing with the life and death of Raoul Moat, opened at the Royal Court Theatre starring Samuel Edward-Cook.

In March 2026, Icke's latest version of Romeo and Juliet, starring Noah Jupe and Sadie Sink, opened at Harold Pinter Theatre to positive reviews. Later in the same year, Icke's own adaptation of The Lives of Others opened at the Adelphi Theatre to positive reviews.

== Personal life ==
Icke is a father.

== Style and reputation ==
Icke has said that, in his work on classics, he searches for a return "to the impulse of the original play, to clear away the accumulated dust of its performance history. So much of great drama was profoundly troubling when it was first done. The word radical actually means to go back to the root. They rioted at Ibsen's A Doll’s House...Audiences shouldn't be allowed to feel nothing."

He has described his philosophy of adaptation as

like using a foreign plug. You are in a country where your hairdryer won't work when you plug it straight in. You have to find the adaptor which will let the electricity of now flow into the old thing and make it function.

Icke has also spoken about the importance of attracting younger audiences to the theatre, describing theatre's elderly audience as "a big problem ...the industry’s going to have to address and sort out because otherwise we’re dead. In 50 or 60 years, there will be no audience." He courted controversy in 2016 by admitting that he thought audiences should leave plays in the interval if they found them boring.

Sarah Crompton has written of Icke's methods for initiating projects, "he finds an actor he wants to collaborate with and then they discuss the play that actor wants to perform", noting "the way he is quietly building relationships with an entire group of actors and bringing them back to work on successive projects." Icke tends to work with the same performers (a group that Natasha Tripney has dubbed "Team Icke") including repeat collaborations with Mark Strong, Luke Thompson, Lia Williams, Tobias Menzies, Juliet Stevenson, Jessica Brown Findlay, Lorna Brown, Daniel Rabin, Rudi Dharmalingham, Joshua Higgott, and Angus Wright.

=== Critical response ===
Lyn Gardner, in The Guardian, was the first mainstream critic to praise Icke's work. Reviewing his Headlong Romeo and Juliet, she wrote

From its opening moments, when a digital clock starts to count the minutes, Icke offers a story in which elements of time and fate are compressed and heightened. In places it's like Sliding Doors, suggesting alternative scenarios... It employs the cross-cutting techniques of movies and TV with startling aplomb, and plays on the drama's presentiments of disaster through dreams and hallucinations... It's terrific, and hails the arrival of some thrilling young actors and an impressive new director.

Though he has failed to satisfy some of the conservative broadsheet critics, such as Dominic Cavendish, Icke has found favour with others, including Susannah Clapp in The Observer, who described him as "one of the most important forces in today’s theatre."

Icke's work, according to Megan Vaughan, "is a sign that the UK’s once stuffy middle-class theatre culture is waking up to more exciting and less prescriptive techniques."

Icke has been praised for successfully balancing technology and artistry in his work. Quentin Letts in The Sunday Times states, "Icke shows are never boring to watch. At a mere 32, he has become the most skilled (or perhaps least irritating) proponent of the ambient-noise/video-screen brigade. His Hamlet had CCTV in the corridors of Elsinore, and in his Mary Stuart, the two main actresses decided only at the start of each performance which of them would play which part. With other directors, this sort of thing can feel forced. With Icke, there is usually enough artistic truthfulness to get you over any grumpiness."

== Works ==
- Romeo and Juliet by Shakespeare, Headlong, UK Tour (2012)
- Boys by Ella Hickson, Headlong, Soho Theatre (2012)
- The Alchemist by Ben Jonson, Liverpool Playhouse (2012)
- 1984 by George Orwell, devised with Duncan Macmillan, Nottingham Playhouse (2013), UK and World Tours, Almeida Theatre (2014), Playhouse Theatre (2014, 2015, 2016), Hudson Theatre (2017)
- Mr Burns by Anne Washburn, Almeida Theatre (2014)
- The Fever by Wallace Shawn, Almeida Theatre (site-specific) (2015)
- Oresteia by Aeschylus (adapted by Robert Icke), Almeida Theatre and Trafalgar Studios (2015), Schauspiel Stuttgart (2018), Park Avenue Armory (2022)
- Uncle Vanya by Chekhov (adapted by Robert Icke), Almeida Theatre (2016)
- The Red Barn by Simenon (adapted by David Hare), National Theatre (2016)
- Mary Stuart by Schiller (adapted by Robert Icke), Almeida Theatre (2016) and Duke of York's Theatre (2018)
- Hamlet by Shakespeare, Almeida Theatre and Harold Pinter Theatre (2017), Park Avenue Armory (2022)
- The Wild Duck after Henrik Ibsen, Almeida Theatre (2018)
- The Crucible by Arthur Miller, Theater Basel (2019)
- The Doctor by Robert Icke (after Professor Bernhardi by Arthur Schnitzler), Almeida Theatre (2019), UK Tour/West End (2022), and Park Avenue Armory (2023)
- Player Kings by Shakespeare, Noel Coward Theatre (2024)
- Oedipus after Sophocles, Toneelgroep Amsterdam (2018), Wyndham's Theatre (2024), Studio 54 (2025)
- Manhunt by Robert Icke, Royal Court Theatre (2025)
- Romeo & Juliet by Shakespeare, Harold Pinter Theatre (2026)
- The Lives of Others by Florian Henckel von Donnersmarck, Adelphi Theatre (2026)

== Awards and honours ==
In 2016, Icke became the youngest ever winner of the Laurence Olivier Award for Best Director.

Icke was elected Fellow of the Royal Society of Literature in June 2018.

Icke was awarded the Classical Association Prize in Summer 2025.

=== Awards and nominations ===
Year	Award	Category	Work	Result
2014	Laurence Olivier Award	Best New Play	1984	Nominated
2015	Critics’ Circle Theatre Award	Best Director	Oresteia	Won
2015	Evening Standard Theatre Award	Best Director	Oresteia	Won
2016	Laurence Olivier Award	Best Director	Oresteia	Won
2019	Kurt Hübner award		Orestie	Won
2019	Evening Standard Theatre Award	Best Director	The Doctor and The Wild Duck	Won
2020	Laurence Olivier Award	Best New Play	The Doctor	Nominated
2023	Drama Desk Award	Outstanding Adaptation	Oresteia	Nominated
2025	Laurence Olivier Award	Best Revival	Oedipus	Won
2025	Critics' Circle Theatre Award	Best Director	Oedipus	Won
2026	Tony Award	Best Revival of a Play	Oedipus	Nominated
2026	Tony Award	Best Direction of a Play	Oedipus	Nominated
2026	Outer Critics Circle Award	Outstanding New Broadway Play	Oedipus	Nominated
2026	Outer Critics Circle Award	Outstanding Direction of a Play	Oedipus	Nominated
2026	Drama Desk Award	Outstanding Adaptation	Oedipus	Won

== See also ==
- List of British playwrights since 1950
- List of English speaking theatre directors in the 20th and 21st centuries
