= Almeida Theatre =

Theatre in Islington, London

- 1833: Islington Literary and Scientific Society; 1875: Wellington Club
- Official logo

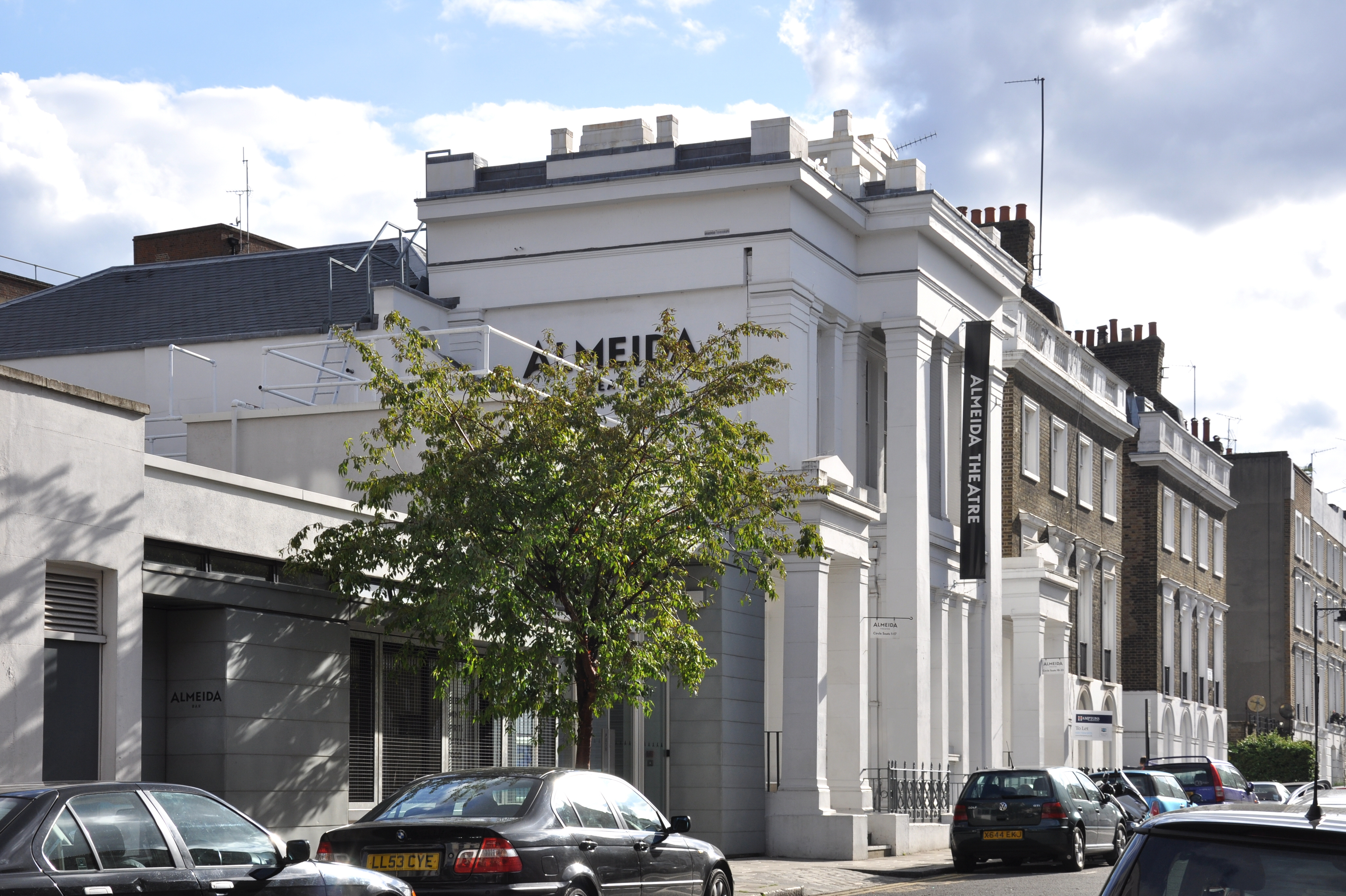
- Almeida Theatre in June 2011
- Interactive map of Almeida Theatre
- Location: Islington; London, N1; United Kingdom
- Coordinates: 51.5395°N 0.1032°W
- Owner: Almeida Theatre trust
- Capacity: 325, over two levels
- Type: Producing house
- Designation: Grade II listed
- Production: Short seasons
- Public transit: Essex Road

Construction
- Opened: 1833 (as reading rooms)
- Rebuilt: 1982 (as theatre); 2000
- Architects: Roumieu and Gough

Website
- almeida.co.uk

The Almeida Theatre is a 325-seat producing house located on Almeida Street off Upper Street in the London Borough of Islington. The theatre opened in 1980, and produces a diverse range of drama. Successful plays are often transferred to West End theatres.

== Building ==
The building that now houses the theatre was originally constructed in 1837 for the newly formed Islington Literary and Scientific Society. It included a library, reading room, museum, laboratory, and a lecture theatre seating 500. The architects were the fashionable partnership of Robert Lewis Roumieu and Alexander Dick Gough. The library was sold off in 1872 and the building was disposed of in 1874 to the Wellington Club (Almeida Street then being called Wellington Street) which occupied it until 1886. In 1885 the hall was used for concerts, balls, and public meetings. The Salvation Army bought the building in 1890, renaming it the Wellington Castle Barracks (Wellington Castle Citadel from 1902). To suit the building's new purpose, the front-facing lecture hall's tiered benches were replaced so that the congregation was seated in the conventional position, facing away from the front, and a balcony was added. The Salvationists remained there until 1955. For a few years from 1956 the building was a factory and showroom for Beck's British Carnival Novelties, then remained empty until in 1972 a campaign began to turn it into a theatre.

The building was Grade II listed by English Heritage in 1972. The current modified building retains the listing.

== History ==
=== Foundation ===
The campaign to open the building as a theatre was led by the Lebanese-born opera and theatre director Pierre Audi, after he had acquired the derelict building in 1979. A public appeal was launched and in 1980, with the building renovated, the theatre opened with a festival of avant-garde music and performance, held both there and at other Islington venues, with Audi as the Artistic Director. Under Audi the theatre's reputation grew and its annual contemporary music festival became highly regarded.

=== 1980s ===
The Almeida International Festival of Contemporary Music and Performance included concert presentations and productions of new, commissioned operas from Europe, Russia, North America, Japan, Argentina, and Morocco. Among the hundreds of composers, musicians and ensembles featured in frequent world and local premiere performances were Steve Reich, Philip Glass, Lou Harrison, Conlon Nancarrow, Morton Feldman, Elliott Carter, Virgil Thomson, Frederic Rzewski, Arvo Pärt, Alfred Schnittke, Wolfgang Rihm, Claude Vivier, Toru Takemitsu, Giacinto Scelsi, Michael Finnissy, Gerald Barry, Somei Satoh, Takehisa Kosugi, Jo Kondo, Sylvano Bussotti, Luis de Pablo, Capricorn, Spectrum, Music Projects/London, Singcircle, the Arditti Quartet, and the London Sinfonietta.

Peter Greenaway's 1983 series of films for Channel 4 Four American Composers featured Almeida presentations of works by John Cage, Robert Ashley and Philip Glass. In 1985 Ástor Piazzolla, the renowned Argentine tango composer and bandoneón player, made a week-long appearance with his Quinteto Nuevo Tango. For several years, the American pianist and composer Yvar Mikhashoff conceived and co-ordinated concert programming, including At the Tomb of Charles Ives: A Celebration of American Experimental Music 1905-1985 which featured world and UK premieres of works by Cage, Nancarrow, Glass, Feldman, Harrison, Rzewski, Charles Ives, George Antheil, Henry Brant, Anthony Braxton, Carla Bley, Roger Reynolds, Charles Wuorinen, and Lukas Foss and two piano marathons he performed himself: The Great American Piano Marathon: 70 works from 70 years in 7 Hours and 50 Tangos - 50 Composers - A Tango Marathon: Selections from the International Tango Collection.

The Almeida housed a producing company which commissioned and staged several theatre works and operas and was a London "receiving house" for Fringe, avant-garde, regional and international theatre productions. Touring companies from the UK were regularly hosted, including Complicité, Shared Experience, Joint Stock, Cheek by Jowl and the Leicester Haymarket, alongside international guest companies from the Philippines, Tibet, Israel, Ireland and Czechoslovakia. Stage directors of Almeida Theatre Company productions included Pierre Audi, Ian McDiarmid, Yuri Lyubimov, Tim Albery, Mike Bradwell, David Hayman, and Jean Jourdheuil. Works by directors Robert Wilson, Robert Lepage, Phelim McDermott, Julia Bardsley, Deborah Warner, Simon McBurney, Annabel Arden and several others were featured in Almeida presentations.

Peter Brook's Bouffes du Nord company played there in 1982 (Brook's company had been one of Audi's original influences for the project). The 1985 Almeida Theatre Company production of The Possessed, a co-production with the Théâtre de l'Europe in Paris which also toured to the Piccolo Teatro in Milan and the Teatro Comunale di Bologna, was Russian director Yuri Lyubimov's first to originate in the West after he defected in 1983 and featured music by Alfred Schnittke, design by Stefanos Lazaridis, and actors Nigel Terry, Clive Merrison, Harriet Walter, and Michael Feast. Ronald Harwood's documentary drama, The Deliberate Death of a Polish Priest premiered at the Almeida in October 1985, an early example of a transcript of a trial of the political murderers of Father Jerzy Popiełuszko. In 1987, the Almeida also became home to Motley Theatre Design Course, under the directorship of Margaret Harris.

The Not the RSC Festival was presented at the Almeida in 1986 and 1987.

=== 1990s ===
In 1990 the Scot Ian McDiarmid and the South African Jonathan Kent took over as joint artistic directors. McDiarmid's first production as director was Howard Barker's Scenes from an Execution, with Glenda Jackson in the lead.

Work by major playwrights, old and new, British and foreign was staged and the theatre acquired an artistic reputation comparable to the leading theatres in central London. According to playwright David Hare, "it reinvented the European repertoire for London audiences and made British theatre more cosmopolitan and outward going". Organised as a non-profit producing theatre, its productions regularly played to packed houses and frequently (14 productions between 1990 and 2002) transferred to London's West End and to New York's Broadway.

In 1993 the theatre won the Laurence Olivier Award for Outstanding Achievement in an Affiliate Theatre.

One of the keys to the success and reputation of the Almeida during the 1990s were the stagings of various plays by Harold Pinter. These included revivals of Betrayal in 1991 and No Man's Land in 1992 and premières of Party Time in 1991 and Moonlight in 1993.

During their time at the theatre, McDiarmid and Kent were described by The Guardian as "[making] Islington a centre of enlightened internationalism"; and, as they were about to leave their positions in 2002, Michael Billington, in same newspaper, summed up their achievements as threefold:

Three things have made the Almeida the most exciting theatre in Britain. First, an eclectically international programme: everything from Molière and Marivaux to Brecht and Neil LaBute. Second, top-level casting that has given us Ralph Fiennes in Hamlet and Ivanov, Kevin Spacey in The Iceman Cometh and Juliette Binoche in Naked. Third, a territorial expansion that has seen the Almeida colonise the Hackney Empire, the old Gainsborough film studios and even a converted bus depot in King's Cross".

=== 1999 to present ===
In November 1999, the Almeida was awarded £1.5 million by the Arts Council of England to undertake essential repairs to the theatre. The work began early in 2001 when the theatre was closed, and the company moved temporarily to a converted bus station at King's Cross. National Lottery backing of £5.8 million allowed for a complete restoration designed by Burrell Foley Fischer.

The restoration included rebuilding and extending the foyer, installing more comfortable seating and access, plus better backstage facilities with the stage area re-built for flexibility and strength, the roof improved and insulated, the lighting grid strengthened, complete re-wiring, and technical equipment updated. Michael Attenborough took over as artistic director in 2002 and, following the completion of its restoration, the theatre was re-opened in May 2003 with a production of Ibsen's The Lady from the Sea, directed by Trevor Nunn. The theatre's artistic remit was the presentation of bold and adventurous play choices staged to the highest possible standards, in productions which revealed them in a new light. This included classics from the British, American and Irish repertoire, foreign classics in newly commissioned versions, and new plays. In October 2012 Attenborough announced that he would step down early in 2013.

Rupert Goold was appointed Artistic Director in February 2013, taking up the post full-time in September 2013. His association with the Almeida Theatre Company began in 2008 when he directed Stephen Adly Guirgis' The Last Days of Judas Iscariot. In 2013 his Headlong theatre company co-produced the premiere of Lucy Kirkwood's Chimerica, directed by Lyndsey Turner, at the Almeida: the show subsequently transferred to the West End, winning five Olivier Awards in 2014. Goold's first Almeida production as full-time artistic director was the world premiere production of American Psycho: A new musical thriller (initially programmed by Michael Attenborough), which ran from 3 December 2013 to 1 February 2014. In 2014 he directed the premiere of Mike Bartlett's play King Charles III, which, following its sold-out run at the Almeida, transferred to Wyndham's Theatre and Broadway.

== Almeida Projects ==
Almeida Projects is the Almeida Theatre's education and community programme. It was founded in its current form in 2003 by Rebecca Manson Jones, after Michael Attenborough's appointment as artistic director. Almeida Projects activity includes durational residencies with partner schools, a subsidised ticket scheme for school groups visiting the theatre, productions of new plays for young people inspired by the main programme, the Young Friends of the Almeida scheme, social networking Teachers' Evenings for local performing arts teachers and a training programme for workshop leaders.

Almeida Projects works closely with nine partner schools in Islington: Central Foundation Boys' School, Elizabeth Garrett Anderson School, Highbury Fields School, Highbury Grove School, Islington Arts and Media School, Mount Carmel Catholic College for Girls, The Bridge School and City and Islington College. The Young Friends of the Almeida Theatre scheme was established in May 2008 to enable local young people to take part in activities outside of school. It currently has over 700 members and includes the Young Friends of the Almeida Creative Board, composed of young people who take an active role in planning and promoting all Young Friends activities.

== Digital Theatre ==
The Almeida was one of the launch theatres for Digital Theatre, a project which makes theatre productions available in video download form. The first performance that was filmed was "Parlour Song".

== Artistic directors ==
- Pierre Audi (1979–1989)
- Jonathan Kent and Ian McDiarmid (1990–2002)
- Michael Attenborough (2002–2013)
- Rupert Goold (2013–2026)
- Dominic Cooke (2026–)

== Notable productions ==
=== 1980s ===
- Interrogations by Yoshi Oida (1981)
- A Dybbuk for Two People, adapted by Bruce Myers (1982)
- L'Os (The Bone) by Birago Diop, Théâtre des Bouffes du Nord, directed by Peter Brook (1982)
- Cage at 70: a concert series featuring works by John Cage including Roaratorio based on Finnegans Wake by James Joyce, Almeida Festival (1982)
- Perfect Lives/Private Parts, television opera by Robert Ashley, Almeida Festival (1983)
- Four Saints in Three Acts, opera by Gertrude Stein and Virgil Thomson, Almeida Festival (1983)
- Hedda Gabler, Almeida Theatre Company, directed by Tim Albery (1984)
- Mrs Gauguin by Helen Cooper, Almeida Theatre Company, directed by Mike Bradwell (1984)
- Melancholy Jacques written and directed by Jean Jourdheuil, Almeida Productions at the Edinburgh Festival/Traverse Theatre and the Bush Theatre featuring Simon Callow (1984)
- The Possessed, Almeida Theatre Company, directed by Yuri Lyubimov, music by Alfred Schnittke, designed by Stefanos Lazaridis (1985)
- At the Tomb of Charles Ives: A Celebration of American Experimental Music 1905-1985, Almeida Festival (1985)
- Kopernikus, opera by Claude Vivier, Almeida Festival, directed by Pierre Audi (1985)
- Man Equals Man by Bertolt Brecht, Almeida Theatre Company, directed by David Hayman (1985)
- Cupboard Man, a dereck, dereck Production, adapted for the stage by Julia Bardsley and Phelim McDermott from the short story by Ian McEwan (1985)
- King Lear, Kick Theatre Company, directed by Deborah Warner (1985)
- The Saxon Shore by David Rudkin, Almeida Theatre Company, directed by Pierre Audi (1986)
- Creditors by August Strindberg, Almeida Theatre Company, directed by Ian McDiarmid (1986)
- Coriolanus, Kick Theatre Company, directed by Deborah Warner (1986)
- The Story of the Eye and the Tooth, El-Hakawati Theatre Company, directed by François Abu Salem (1986)
- Milva Sings Brecht, song recital by Milva (1986)
- Gaudete, a dereck, dereck Production, adapted for the stage by Julia Bardsley and Phelim McDermott from the prose poem by Ted Hughes (1986)
- The Great Hunger by Tom MacIntyre from Patrick Kavanagh, Abbey Theatre, directed by Patrick Mason (1986)
- Not the RSC Festival (1986–87)
- Jakob Lenz, opera by Wolfgang Rihm, Almeida Opera, directed by Pierre Audi (1987)
- Hamletmachine by Heiner Mueller, directed by Robert Wilson (1987)
- The Tourist Guide by Botho Strauss, Almeida Theatre Company, directed by Pierre Audi featuring Tilda Swinton and Paul Freeman (1987)
- Théâtre de Complicité retrospective (1988–89)
- The Undivine Comedy, opera by Michael Finnissy, Almeida Opera (1988)
- Golem, opera by John Casken, Almeida Opera, directed by Pierre Audi (1989)
- The Vinegar Works, a dereck, dereck Production, adapted for the stage by Julia Bardsley and Phelim McDermott from the illustrated books by Edward Gorey (1989)
- Polygraph by Robert Lepage and Marie Brassard (1989)
- Indigo, performed March 1989. Cast included Caroline Lee-Johnson, Hakeem Kae-Kazim, Dougray Scott and Brian Protheroe. Directed by Keith Boak.

=== 1990s ===
- Scenes from an Execution, by Howard Barker, starring Glenda Jackson (1990)
- The Intelligence Park, opera by Gerald Barry, Almeida Opera, directed by David Fielding (1990)
- Europeras III and IV by John Cage, Almeida Festival (1990)
- Betrayal by Harold Pinter, directed by David Leveaux, starring Cheryl Campbell, Martin Shaw and Bill Nighy (1991)
- Lulu, adapted from Earth Spirit and Pandora's Box by Frank Wedekind, directed by Ian McDiarmid starring Joanne Whalley (1991)
- Party Time and Mountain Language by Harold Pinter (1991)
- The Rules of the Game by Luigi Pirandello, translated and adapted by David Hare, directed by Jonathan Kent, starring Nicola Pagett and Richard Griffiths (1992)
- Medea by Euripides, directed by Jonathan Kent, starring Diana Rigg (1992)
- No Man's Land by Harold Pinter, directed by David Leveaux, starring Paul Eddington and Harold Pinter (1992)
- The Deep Blue Sea by Terence Rattigan, directed by Karel Reisz, starring Penelope Wilton and Linus Roache (1993)
- The Showman by Thomas Bernhard, directed by Jonathan Kent, starring Alan Bates (1993)
- Moonlight by Harold Pinter, directed by David Leveaux, starring Ian Holm, Anna Massey, Douglas Hodge, Michael Sheen, Claire Skinner, Edward de Souza and Jill Johnson (1993)
- Life of Galileo by Bertolt Brecht, adapted by David Hare (1994)
- The Playboy of the Western World by J.M.Synge (1994) starring Aidan Gillen and Aisling O'Sullivan (1994)
- Molly Sweeney by Brian Friel (1994)
- The Winter Guest by Sharman MacDonald, directed by Alan Rickman, starring Phyllida Law, Siân Thomas and Sheila Reid (1995)
- Gangster No. 1 by Louis Mellis and David Scinto, directed by Jonathan Kent starring Peter Bowles, Richard Johnson, Sharon Duce, Kenneth Colley and John Cater (1995)
- "1953" by Craig Raine, directed by Patrick Marber (1996)
- Who's Afraid of Virginia Woolf? by Edward Albee, starring Diana Rigg and David Suchet (1996)
- Ivanov by Anton Chekhov, adapted by David Hare, starring Ralph Fiennes and Bill Paterson (1997)
- The Government Inspector, by Nikolai Gogol, adapted by John Byrne, starring Ian McDiarmid and Tom Hollander (1997)
- Naked by Luigi Pirandello, adapted by Nicholas Wright directed by Jonathan Kent, starring Juliette Binoche (1998)
- The Iceman Cometh by Eugene O'Neill, starring Kevin Spacey, Tim Pigott-Smith and Mark Strong (1998)
- The Play About the Baby by Edward Albee, directed by Howard Davies, starring Alan Howard, Frances de la Tour, Rupert Penry Jones and Zöe Waites (1998)
- Certain Young Men by Peter Gill, directed by Peter Gill (1999)
- Speer by Esther Vilar, translated by Martin Wagner, directed by Klaus Maria Brandauer, starring Klaus Maria Brandauer and Sven Erich Bechtolf (1999)
- Aunt Dan and Lemon by Wallace Shawn, starring Miranda Richardson (1999)

=== 2000s ===
- Celebration and The Room by Harold Pinter, directed by Harold Pinter, starring Keith Allen, Lindsay Duncan, Lia Williams, Danny Dyer and George Harris (2000)
- Hedda Gabler by Henrik Ibsen, adapted and directed by Richard Eyre, starring Eve Best and Benedict Cumberbatch (2005)
- Stephen Dillane's Macbeth by William Shakespeare, directed by Travis Preston (2005-2010)
- Dying for It by Moira Buffini after Erdman, directed by Anna Mackmin (2007)
- Cloud Nine by Caryl Churchill, directed by Thea Sharrock, starring Tobias Menzies and Nicola Walker (2007)
- The Last Days of Judas Iscariot by Stephen Adly Guirgis, directed by Rupert Goold, co-production with Headlong (2008)
- Rosmersholm by Henrik Ibsen, adapted by Mike Poulton, directed by Anthony Page, starring Helen McCrory (2008)
- Waste by Harley Granville Barker, directed by Samuel West (2008)
- Parlour Song by Jez Butterworth, directed by Ian Rickson, starring Toby Jones (2009)
- When the Rain Stops Falling by Andrew Bovell, directed by Michael Attenborough (2009)
- Rope by Patrick Hamilton (produced in association with Sonia Friedman Production), directed by Roger Michell, starring Bertie Carvel and Phoebe Waller-Bridge (2009)

=== 2010s ===
- Through a Glass Darkly by Ingmar Bergman, adapted by Jenny Worton, directed by Michael Attenborough (2010)
- The Master Builder by Henrik Ibsen in translation by Kenneth McLeish, directed by Travis Preston, starring Gemma Arterton, Stephen Dillane and John Light (2011)
- The Knot of the Heart by David Eldridge, directed by Michael Attenborough, starring Sophie Stanton (2011)
- My City written and directed by Stephen Poliakoff (2011)
- The House of Bernarda Alba by Federico García Lorca, adapted by Emily Mann, directed by Bijan Sheibani (2012)
- Children's Children by Matthew Dunster, directed by Jeremy Herrin (2012)
- Filumena by Eduardo De Filippo, adapted by Tanya Ronder, directed by Michael Attenborough (2012)
- King Lear by William Shakespeare, directed by Michael Attenborough, starring Jonathan Pryce (2012)
- Chimerica by Lucy Kirkwood, directed by Lyndsey Turner, starring Stephen Campbell Moore (2013)
- Little on the Inside by Alice Birch, directed by Lucy Morrison (2013)
- Ghosts by Henrik Ibsen, adapted and directed by Richard Eyre (2013)
- American Psycho: a new musical thriller, directed by Rupert Goold, starring Matt Smith (2013)
- 1984 by George Orwell, adapted by Duncan MacMillan and Robert Icke, directed by Robert Icke (2014)
- King Charles III by Mike Bartlett, directed by Rupert Goold, starring Tim Pigott-Smith (2014)
- Mr Burns: A Post-Electric Play by Anne Washburn, directed by Robert Icke (2014)
- Little Revolution by Alecky Blythe, directed by Joe Hill-Gibbins (2014)
- The Merchant of Venice by William Shakespeare, directed by Rupert Goold (2014)
- Game by Mike Bartlett, directed by Sacha Wares (2015)
- Carmen Disruption by Simon Stephens, directed by Michael Longhurst, starring Noma Dumezweni (2015)
- Oresteia by Aeschylus, adapted and directed by Robert Icke, starring Lia Williams and Jessica Brown Findlay (2015)
- Bakkhai by Euripides, directed by James MacDonald, starring Ben Whishaw (2015)
- Medea by Euripides, directed by Rupert Goold, starring Kate Fleetwood (2015)
- Uncle Vanya by Anton Chekhov, adapted and directed by Robert Icke, starring Jessica Brown Findlay and Tobias Menzies (2016)
- Richard III by William Shakespeare, directed by Rupert Goold, starring Ralph Fiennes and Vanessa Redgrave (2016)
- Oil by Ella Hickson, directed by Carrie Cracknell (2016)
- Mary Stuart by Friedrich Schiller, adapted and directed by Robert Icke, starring Juliet Stevenson and Lia Williams, music by Laura Marling (2016)
- Hamlet by William Shakespeare, directed by Robert Icke, starring Andrew Scott, Jessica Brown Findlay and Juliet Stevenson (2017) (successful production that transferred to West End's Harold Pinter Theatre)
- The Treatment by Martin Crimp, directed by Lyndsey Turner, starring Indira Varma, Julian Ovenden, Gary Beadle, Matthew Needham (2017)
- Ink by James Graham, directed by Rupert Goold, starring Bertie Carvel (2017)
- Against by Christopher Shinn, directed by Ian Rickson, starring Ben Whishaw (2017)
- Albion by Mike Bartlett, directed by Rupert Goold, starring Victoria Hamilton (2017)
- The Twilight Zone based on stories by Rod Serling, Charles Beaumont and Richard Matheson, adapted by Anne Washburn, directed by Richard Jones (2017)
- Summer and Smoke by Tennessee Williams, directed by Rebecca Frecknall, starring Patsy Ferran and Matthew Needham (2018)
- The Writer by Ella Hickson, directed by Blanche McIntyre, starring Romola Garai and Samuel West (2018)
- Machinal by Sophie Treadwell, directed by Natalie Abrahami, starring Emily Berrington and Denise Black (2018)
- Dance Nation by Clare Barron, directed by Bijan Sheibani, starring Brendan Cowell and Sarah Hadland (2018)
- The Wild Duck by Henrik Ibsen, directed by Robert Icke, starring Nicholas Farrell and Lyndsey Marshal (2018)
- The Tragedy of King Richard the Second by William Shakespeare, directed by Joe Hill-Gibbins, starring Simon Russell Beale and Leo Bill (2018)
- The Duchess of Malfi by John Webster, directed by Rebecca Frecknall (2019)
- Shipwreck by Anne Washburn, directed by Rupert Goold (2019)

=== 2020s ===
- The Tragedy of Macbeth by William Shakespeare, directed by Yael Farber, starring James McArdle and Saoirse Ronan (2022)
- The Chairs by Eugène Ionesco, translated and directed by Omar Elerian (2022)
- Patriots by Peter Morgan, directed by Rupert Goold, starring Tom Hollander and Will Keen (2022) (Transferred to Noel Coward Theatre, West End and Ethel Barrymore Theater, Broadway)
- Tammy Faye by Elton John, Jake Shears, and James Graham, directed by Rupert Goold, starring Andrew Rannells and Katie Brayben (2022) (Transferred to Palace Theater, Broadway)
- A Streetcar Named Desire by Tennessee Williams, directed by Rebecca Frecknall, starring Patsy Ferran, Paul Mescal, and Anjana Vasan (2022) (Transferred to Phoenix Theatre, West End)
- The Secret Life of Bees by Lynn Nottage, Duncan Sheik, and Susan Birkenhead, based on the novel of the same name by Sue Monk Kidd, directed by Whitney White (2023)
- Romeo and Juliet by William Shakespeare, directed by Rebecca Frecknall, starring Toheeb Jimoh and Isis Hainsworth (2023)
- A Mirror by Sam Holcroft, directed by Jeremy Herrin, starring Jonny Lee Miller (2023) (Transferred to Trafalgar Theatre, West End)
- Portia Coughlan by Marina Carr, directed by Carrie Cracknell, starring Alison Oliver (2023)
- Cold War by Elvis Costello, Conor McPherson, based on the film of the same name by Paweł Pawlikowski, directed by Rupert Goold (2023)
- King Lear by William Shakespeare, directed by Yaël Farber, starring Danny Sapani (2024)
- The Years by Eline Arbo, adapted with Stephanie Bain, based on the novel of the same name by Annie Ernaux, directed by Eline Arbo (2024) (Transferred to Harold Pinter Theatre, West End)
- Angry and Young season, including Roots by Arnold Wesker, directed by Diyan Zora, and Look Back in Anger by John Osborne, directed by Atri Banerjee (2024)
- Cat on a Hot Tin Roof by Tennessee Williams, directed by Rebecca Frecknall, starring Daisy Edgar-Jones and Kingsley Ben-Adir (2024)
- Otherland by Chris Bush, directed by Ann Yee (2025)
- Rhinoceros by Eugène Ionesco, translated and directed by Omar Elerian (2025)
- 1536 by Ava Pickett, directed by Lyndsey Turner (2025)
- A Moon for the Misbegotten by Eugene O'Neill, directed by Rebecca Frecknall, starring Ruth Wilson and Michael Shannon (2025)
- Romans: A Novel by Alice Birch, directed by Sam Pritchard, starring Kyle Soller (2025)
- The Line of Beauty by Jack Holden, based on the novel of the same name by Alan Hollinghurst, directed by Michael Grandage (2025)
- Christmas Day by Sam Grabiner, directed by James Macdonald (2025)
- American Psycho by Roberto Aguirre-Sacasa, directed by Rupert Goold (2026, revival of 2013 production)
- A Doll's House by Henrik Ibsen, adapted by Anya Reiss, directed by Joe Hill-Gibbins, starring Romola Garai (2026)
- Under the Shadow by Carmen Nasr, based on the film of the same name by Babak Anvari, directed by Nadia Latif, starring Leila Farzad (2026)
- Cleansed by Sarah Kane, directed by Rebecca Frecknall (2026)
- Golden Boy by Clifford Odets, directed by Sam Yates, starring Josh O'Connor (2026)
- Desire Under the Elms by Eugene O'Neill, directed by Ebenezer Bamgboye (2026)
