= Oedipus (Icke play) =

2018 play by Robert Icke

- Poster for the 2025 Broadway production
- Written by: Robert Icke
- Characters: Oedipus; Jocasta; Teiresias; Creon; Merope; Eteocles; Polyneices; Antigone; Corin; Driver
- Genre: Drama

Premiere
- Date: 8 April 2018
- Place: Toneelgroep Amsterdam

Oedipus is a 2018 play by Robert Icke. It is a reimagining of the play Oedipus Tyrannos by Sophocles, set on the evening of an election.

== Plot ==
Oedipus is a politician on the verge of winning a landslide election. As his family gather for an evening together, and as the polls close, Oedipus' life starts to fall apart. As a clock ticks down to his victory in real time, the truth about who he is emerges.

== Production history ==
=== Toneelgroep Amsterdam (2018) ===
Having been invited by Ivo van Hove to Toneelgroep Amsterdam, Icke wrote Oedipus specifically for the actors of the ensemble. Icke wrote in English, and the script was translated into Dutch by Rob Klinkenberg. Working with his regular creative team, designer Hildegard Bechtler, lighting designer Natasha Chivers, video designer Tal Yarden and sound designer Tom Gibbons, Icke's production premiered on 8 April 2018 in the Melkweg's Rabozaal. Its critical success led to Icke making a further four productions with the company. Icke stated his goal as "...to provide for an audience today the impact and immediacy of the original before we all knew its twists and turns". Icke spoke later of the production as a "love story", specifying: "It's easy in Oedipus to make the audience go, 'Ugh, incest.' The difficult thing is to make them want the incest to continue. The challenge is to take the audience to the place they didn't know they could go." The Dutch production toured, including to the Edinburgh International Festival in 2019, where it received rave reviews from the UK theatre press. It was later filmed as an ITA Live capture.

=== West End (2024) ===
In 2019, Sonia Friedman announced that Icke's production would open in the West End in 2020, starring Mark Strong and Helen Mirren. Following the COVID pandemic, Mirren's schedule prohibited her participation and Lesley Manville was announced as the production's new Jocasta. The same creative team worked on the production, and the script was published by Nick Hern Books.

It opened at the Wyndham's Theatre on the 15th October 2024 to ecstatic reviews from the UK press. Icke, Manville and Strong all won Critics' Circle Theatre Awards and Manville an Olivier Award for Best Actress. The production was named the Best Revival at the Olivier Awards in 2025.

=== Broadway (2025) ===
The production, led by Strong and Manville, transferred to Studio 54 in the fall of 2025 and played a successful season until February 2026. Anne Reid made her Broadway debut in the role of Merope, aged 90. The production was nominated for seven Tony Awards, including Best Revival of a Play and nominations for Strong and Manville.

=== Elsewhere ===
The production, with the same creative team, opened in the fall of 2025 in Athens at the Onassis Stegi, performed in Greek. The same creative team opened a production in German at the Residence Theatre in Munich.

The play opened the 2027 season for the Sydney Theatre Company, starring Heather Mitchell and Richard Roxburgh.

== Critical reception ==
Icke's production has largely been received well by critics. Sarah Hemming wrote in her five-star Financial Times review of the London production:

Icke's staging buzzes with resonance in a world where truth is a contested commodity and politicians promising change stride across the public domain, where arguments rage about who belongs and who doesn't. But it also goes much deeper. It reaches far into the nagging question of how much any of us really want to know, evoking that sudden lurch of panic when a partner's infidelity, a redundancy or a medical diagnosis pulls the rug from under us and shifts our perception of who we are.

In The New York Times, Alexis Soloski praised the show, calling Strong's and Manville's performances "superb" and Icke's script "electrifying".

== Characters and cast ==
Character	Amsterdam	Edinburgh	West End	Broadway	Athens	Munich
Character	2018	2019	2024	2025		2026
Oedipus	Hans Kesting	Hans Kesting	Mark Strong	Mark Strong	Nikos Kouris	Florian von Manteuffel
Jocasta	Marieke Heebink	Marieke Heebink	Lesley Manville	Lesley Manville	Karyofyllia Karabeti	Barbara Horvath
Merope	Frieda Pittoors	Frieda Pittoors	June Watson	Anne Reid	Rania Oikonomidou	Rita Russek
Creon	Aus Greidanus jr.	Aus Greidanus jr.	Michael Gould	John Carroll Lynch	Alexandros Mylonas	Robert Dölle
Antigone	Helene Devos	Gaite Jansen	Phia Saban	Olivia Reis	Danai-Arsenia Filidou	Linda Blümchen
Polyneices	Harm Duco Schut	Harm Duco Schut	James Wilbraham	James Wilbraham	Giannis Tsoumarakis	Dominik Weileder
Eteocles	Josha Stradowski	Josha Stradowski	Jordan Scowen	Jordan Scowen	Giorgos Ziakas	Volodymyr Melnykov
Teiresias	Hugo Koolschijn	Hugo Koolschijn	Samuel Brewer	Samuel Brewer	Kostas Nikouli	Steffen Höld
Driver	Bart Slegers	Bart Slegers	Gary McDonald	Teagle F. Bougere	Sokratis Patsikas	Thomas Reisinger
Corin	Fred Goessens	Alexander Elmecky	Bhasker Patel	Bhasker Patel	Takis Sakellariou	Michael Goldberg
Lichas	Violet Brackman	Violet Brackman	Sara Hazemi	Ani Mesa-Perez	Chara Giota	Daria Welsch

== Awards and nominations ==
=== 2018 Netherlands Production ===
Year	Award	Category	Nominee	Result	Ref.
2018	VSCD Toneelprijzen	Theo D'Or	Marieke Heebink	Nominated	

=== 2024 West End production ===
Year	Award	Category	Nominee	Result	Ref.
2025	Critics' Circle Theatre Award	Best Actress	Lesley Manville	Won	
2025	Critics' Circle Theatre Award	Best Actor	Mark Strong	Won	
2025	Critics' Circle Theatre Award	Best Director	Robert Icke	Won	
2025	Laurence Olivier Awards	Best Revival		Won	
2025	Laurence Olivier Awards	Best Actress	Lesley Manville	Won	
2025	Laurence Olivier Awards	Best Actor	Mark Strong	Nominated	
2025	Laurence Olivier Awards	Best Director	Robert Icke	Nominated	
2025	Laurence Olivier Awards	Best Theatre Choreographer	Hofesh Shechter	Nominated	
2025	Laurence Olivier Awards	Best Sound Design	Christopher Shutt	Nominated	

=== 2025 Broadway production ===
Year	Award	Category	Nominee	Result	Ref.
2026	Tony Awards	Best Revival of a Play		Nominated	
2026	Tony Awards	Best Actor in a Play	Mark Strong	Nominated	
2026	Tony Awards	Best Actress in a Play	Lesley Manville	Won	
2026	Tony Awards	Best Direction of a Play	Robert Icke	Nominated	
2026	Tony Awards	Best Scenic Design in a Play	Hildegard Bechtler	Nominated	
2026	Tony Awards	Best Lighting Design in a Play	Natasha Chivers	Nominated	
2026	Tony Awards	Best Sound Design in a Play	Tom Gibbons	Nominated	
2026	Drama Desk Awards	Outstanding Lead Performance in a Play	Lesley Manville	Won	
2026	Drama Desk Awards	Outstanding Sound Design of a Play	Tom Gibbons	Won	
2026	Drama Desk Awards	Outstanding Projection Design	Tal Yarden	Won	
2026	Drama Desk Awards	Outstanding Adaptation	Robert Icke	Won	
2026	Outer Critics Circle Awards	Outstanding New Broadway Play		Nominated	
2026	Outer Critics Circle Awards	Outstanding Lead Performer in a Broadway Play	Lesley Manville	Nominated	
2026	Outer Critics Circle Awards	Outstanding Direction of a Play	Robert Icke	Nominated	
2026	Theatre World Award	Honoree	Lesley Manville	Won	
