= 2071 (play) =

Play about climate change

- Poster for the original 2014 production with the tagline "Climate change takes centre stage in this urgent new piece of theatre"
- Written by: Duncan MacMillan; Chris Rapley
- Subject: Climate change
- Genre: monologue

Premiere
- Date: 6 November 2014
- Place: Royal Court Theatre, London
- Directed by: Katie Mitchell

The play 2071 is a "dramatised lecture" written by Chris Rapley, a climate scientist, and playwright Duncan MacMillan. It was first performed in 2014 at the Royal Court Theatre in London and was directed by Katie Mitchell.

== Plot ==
The play is in Rapley's voice and was first performed by him in 2014 at the Royal Court Theatre, London. The piece is partially a memoir of Rapley's life and career and partially an explanation of climate change and of the controversies surrounding it. The title, 2071, is the year in which Rapley's oldest grandchild will be 67 years old, which was Rapley's age when he first performed it in 2014.

== Production ==
The original production was directed by Katie Mitchell; designer Chloe Lamford’s incorporated "swirling video images behind him that illustrate Rapley’s arguments and have a strange beauty of their own". The videos were done by Luke Halls, and Paul Clark composed music for the production. The production was done jointly with the Deutsches Schauspielhaus in Hamburg, Germany. In December, 2014, it was presented there in English with German subtitles added.

A short-run production was mounted in August 2019 at the Episcopal Actors Guild in New York, with actor Robert Meksin as Rapley, directed by Carin Zakes, to benefit 350.org.

== Reviews ==
Reviewing the play, Michael Billington, theatre critic for The Guardian since 1971, wrote "if we look to theatre to increase our awareness of the human condition, the evening succeeds on all counts". Some reviewers were less enthusiastic, with Aleks Sierz writing, "Why is the Royal Court hosting such devised work, and not commissioning playwrights to create new metaphor-rich plays about this subject?"

== Publication ==
In 2015, the script of the play was published in England with the title 2071: The World We’ll Leave Our Grandchildren, and a translation into German, 2° Grad, was published in Germany.
