= Professor Bernhardi =

Play by Arthur Schnitzler

Professor Bernhardi (1912) is one of the best known plays written by the Viennese dramatist, short story writer and novelist Arthur Schnitzler. It was first performed in Berlin at the Kleines Theater in 1912, but banned in Austria until the collapse of the Austro-Hungarian Empire as a result of World War I. Although billed as a "comedy in five acts", the play explores antisemitism and Austrian-Jewish identity.

== Plot ==
The setting is Vienna, 1900. Professor Bernhardi is a Jewish physician, director of the Elisabethinum, a clinic named in honor of Empress Elisabeth of Austria. A young woman in his care is dying of sepsis following an abortion. Unaware that she is on the brink of death, she is happy and believes herself to be recovering. Father Reder, a priest summoned by a nurse arrives to give the patient the last rites but Bernhardi refuses him admission. He wants to spare her the anguish she would suffer were she to realize that she is about to die. The priest argues that she must be absolved of sin before she dies, especially since she has undergone an abortion. While Bernhardi and Father Reder are arguing, the girl dies, having been told by the nurse that the priest arrived. Her death was hastened by having realized that her condition was terminal and she died in a state of fear.

A press campaign causes public outcry. False testimony and fabrications about Bernhardi striking the priest inflame the endemic antisemitism. Bernhardi faces trial. Professor Ebenwald, a man with influence among corrupt judicial officers offers to pay a bribe so that Bernhardi can avoid trial. He will do this on condition that Bernhardi agrees to instate a Christian physician rather than Dr. Wenger, a Jewish physician Bernhardi had wanted to appoint based on merit. Bernhardi refuses Ebenwald's suggestion.

Bernhardi is visited by Father Reder. Reder admits that Bernhardi acted properly and in accordance with his duty as the patient's physician. Bernhardi asks why Reder did not say as much during the legal proceedings. He answers that he could not because that would have been to acknowledge that Bernhardi had more right to send him away than he had right to administer the last rites. He claims that he stayed silent because of divine inspiration which compelled him to protect the church. When Bernhardi questions him about this, he accuses Bernhardi of refusing admission to the patient because of hostility towards the Catholic Church. The verdict of the trial is given. Bernhardi loses his post in the clinic he helped to found, is sentenced to two months in prison and loses his license to practice medicine. He refuses to appeal the decision.

The play ends with a philosophical discussion of the case between Bernhardi and a friend, Winkler, following Bernhardi's release.

== Characters ==
- Professor Bernhardi, professor for internal medicine and director of the Elizabethinum
- Franz Reder, priest of the Church of Holy Florian
- Sister Ludmilla, a nurse
- Professor Ebenwald, professor of surgery, vice-director of the Elizabethinum
- Professor Flint, minister of culture and education, professor of surgery and childhood friend of Bernhardi, later his opponent
- Oskar Bernhardi, Professor Bernhardi's son and his assistant
- Doctor Goldenthal, attorney-at-law
- Kulka, a reporter
- Winkler, Bernhardi's friend

== Adaptations ==
In 2019, the play was reimagined as The Doctor by writer and director Robert Icke. The Doctor premiered at the Almeida Theatre on August 10, 2019. The production was planned to transfer to London's West End, but was postponed due to the coronavirus pandemic. In 2021 the Almeida theatre production was invited to perform at the Adelaide Festival in Australia, the most prestigious theatrical festival in the Southern hemisphere. 2023 saw the production 'revived' at the King James Theatre in London, followed by a transfer to The Park Avenue Armory Theatre in New York. Also in 2023, the play, entitled "Docteure" in Québec, is presented by Compagnie Jean-Duceppe at Théâtre Jean-Duceppe, Place des Arts in Montréal. The lead role of Dr. Rachelle Wolff is played by actress Pascale Montpetit. The same year also Uppsala stadsteater, Uppsala, Sweden, presented the play. The director was Carolina Frände.
