= Jorge Dorado =

Spanish director

- Born: Jorge Dorado; December 8, 1976 (age 49); Madrid, Spain
- Education: Complutense University of Madrid
- Occupations: Director; screenwriter; producer
- Years active: 1998–present

Jorge Dorado (born December 8, 1976) is a Spanish director, screenwriter and producer. He received Goya Award nominations for his short film La guerra, his documentary short Nuevos tiempos, and his directorial feature film debut Mindscape.

== Career ==
He studied Communication Studies at the Complutense University of Madrid. He began his career working in as assistant director on films like Bad Education and Talk to Her by Pedro Almodóvar, The Devil's Backbone by Guillermo del Toro and Moulin Rouge! by Baz Luhrmann.

As director, he has made five short films and a documentary, among them, The War (co-directed with Luis Berdejo, a candidate for the Goya Award in 2006, and with more than 50 international awards). He also shot and directed the 2012 short film El Otro. For five years, working as advertising director, he was responsible for campaigns for Nintendo, Bancaja, Movistar, and the Olympic big campaign, for which he was nominated Best New Commercials Director in Spain, and more.

His film Mindscape, a psychological thriller, is Dorado's first feature, as well as the first chapter in a collaboration between Ombra Films (formed by Orphan & Unknown director Jaume Collet-Serra with Juan Solá) and StudioCanal. The film stars Mark Strong, Brian Cox and Taissa Farmiga.
