= The Lives of Others (play) =

2026 play by Robert Icke

- Original language: English
- Written by: Robert Icke
- Based on: 2006 film The Lives of Others by Florian Henckel von Donnersmarck
- Genre: Political drama Psychological thriller

Premiere
- Date: 29 October 2026
- Place: Adelphi Theatre, London
- Directed by: Robert Icke

The Lives of Others is a play adapted by Robert Icke, based on Florian Henckel von Donnersmarck's film of the same name.

Directed by Icke, the world premiere production of The Lives of Others opened at the Adelphi Theatre in October 2026.

== Production ==
The Lives of Others was scheduled to begin previews at the Adelphi Theatre in London's West End on 14 October 2026. This was later cancelled due to technical issues and the show subsequently began the next day. The official opening night took place on 29 October, for a limited run until 9 January 2027. Lead casting includes Keira Knightley as Christa-Maria Sieland, Stephen Dillane as Gerd Wiesler and Luke Thompson as Georg Dreyman.

The original production featured design by Hildegard Bechtler, lighting by Jon Clark, video design by Tal Yarden, original music by Max Richter and sound design by Giles Thomas.

== Cast and characters ==
Character	West End
Character	2026
Christa-Maria Sieland	Keira Knightley
Gerd Wiesler	Stephen Dillane
Georg Dreyman	Luke Thompson
Hauser	Calum Finlay
Actress	Lucy Doyle
Lehmann	Josh Gordon
Grubitz	Paul Higgins
Mrs Meineke	Leda Hodgson
Jerska	Nick Holder
Graphologist	Sibylla Meienberg
Wallner	Irfan Shamji
Meier	Richard Sutton
Hempf	Andrew Woodall
