= Liza Marshall =

English film producer

- Born: Liza Louise Marshall; March 1972 (age 54)
- Education: Wadham College, Oxford
- Occupation: Film producer
- Years active: 2000–present
- Spouse: Mark Strong

Liza Louise Marshall (born 1972) is an English film and TV producer best known for producing the 2025 film Hamnet. Early in her career, Marshall worked as a script reader and script editor before moving into producing, working in that capacity at the BBC and as head of drama at Channel 4, and later producing a number of theatrical feature films. In 2019, she optioned the rights to Maggie O'Farrell's novel Hamnet and served as a producer on the eventual film adaptation, for which she was one of the recipients of the 2025 BAFTA Award for Outstanding British Film and the Golden Globe Award for Best Motion Picture – Drama, in addition to being nominated for the Academy Award for Best Picture and the Producers Guild of America Award.

== Early life and education ==
Marshall was educated at St Paul's Girls' School in London and at Wadham College, Oxford, where she read history. At Oxford, her friends included Martha Lane Fox and Andy Cato. Her interest in producing began as a university student, where she helped to stage productions of plays at colleges, including a production of Richard III.

== Career ==
Marshall's first job in the TV industry was as an assistant to a casting director on the British medical soap opera Peak Practice. After realising that she wanted to work with writers, she transitioned to working as a script reader and script editor, including an early job on the soap opera London Bridge. Her first job as a producer was on the 2000 drama series The Sins. She would go on to work as a producer for the BBC for seven years. Following this, she was head of drama at Channel 4 for five years.

One of her first feature films as a producer was Ken Loach's drama It's a Free World... which premiered at the 2007 Venice Film Festival; the film's screenwriter Paul Laverty went on to win the Golden Osella at the festival for Best Screenplay. Later productions include the adaptation Before I Go to Sleep starring Nicole Kidman, Colin Firth and Mark Strong, and The End We Start From starring Jodie Comer.

In 2019, she read a copy of Maggie O'Farrell's Hamnet, five months before it was published, and made a successful bid for the film rights to the novel. Marshall would later team with Pippa Harris, Sam Mendes and Steven Spielberg to produce the film. Marshall's first choice as director was Academy Award winner Chloé Zhao, who signed on in 2023 to direct and co-write the adaptation. Hamnet premiered at the 52nd Telluride Film Festival in August 2025 and would go on to be nominated for eight Oscars at the 98th Academy Awards, including a Best Picture nomination for Marshall and the other producers.

== Personal life ==
Marshall is married to the actor Mark Strong, with whom she has two sons. In a 2014 interview with Strong, it was stated that they first met during the production of the 2002 BBC drama series Fields of Gold, which Marshall produced and Strong acted in.
