= Eisenhorn: Xenos =

2016 science-fiction action video game

- Developer: Pixel Hero Games
- Publisher: Pixel Hero Games
- Series: Warhammer 40,000
- Platforms: Microsoft Windows, iOS, Android
- Release: 10 August 2016
- Genre: Action-adventure game
- Mode: Single-player

Eisenhorn: Xenos is a third-person science-fiction action-adventure game produced and developed by Pixel Hero Games. Set in the Warhammer 40,000 universe, it is based on the novel Xenos, the first book of the Eisenhorn trilogy by Dan Abnett. It was scheduled for release on May 19, 2016, but was ultimately pushed back to August. It was released on Steam for PC on 10 August 2016.

On July 19th, 2019, the game was delisted from Steam and mobile stores "at the request of the publisher."

== Plot ==
The gameplay centers around the Inquisition that moves amongst mankind like an avenging shadow, striking down the enemies of humanity with complete ruthlessness. Imperial inquisitor Gregor Eisenhorn (voiced by Mark Strong) faces a vast interstellar cabal and the dark power of daemons, all racing to recover an arcane text of supreme and abominable power — an ancient tome known as the Necroteuch.

== Reception ==
Reception

Aggregate score
Aggregator	Score
Metacritic	(PC) 46/100 (iOS) 63/100

Review score
Publication	Score
TouchArcade	2.5/5

Eisenhorn: Xenos received "generally unfavorable" reviews for Microsoft Windows and "mixed or average" reviews for iOS. The game's graphics, combat system and controls were criticized; in addition, it was hard for some players to understand the plot without knowledge of the original novel.
