= Mindscape (2013 film) =

- Theatrical release poster
- Directed by: Jorge Dorado
- Screenplay by: Guy Holmes
- Story by: Martha Holmes; Guy Holmes
- Produced by: Jaume Collet-Serra; Mercedes Gamero; Peter Safran; Juan Sola
- Starring: Mark Strong; Taissa Farmiga; Saskia Reeves; Richard Dillane; Indira Varma; Noah Taylor; Alberto Ammann; Brian Cox
- Cinematography: Óscar Faura
- Edited by: Jaime Valdueza
- Music by: Lucas Vidal; John Ottman
- Production companies: Ombra Films; Antena 3 Films; StudioCanal; The Safran Company
- Distributed by: Warner Bros. Pictures (Spain); StudioCanal (United Kingdom); Vertical Entertainment (United States)
- Release dates: October 13, 2013 (Sitges); January 24, 2014 (Spain); June 6, 2014 (United States)
- Running time: 99 minutes
- Countries: Spain; United Kingdom; United States; France
- Language: English
- Budget: $4.4 million
- Box office: $1.2 million

Mindscape (also known as Anna) is a 2013 internationally co-produced psychological thriller science-fiction film, and the directorial debut of Spanish filmmaker Jorge Dorado. The film stars Mark Strong, Taissa Farmiga, Noah Taylor, and Brian Cox. The screenplay was written by Guy Holmes and follows John, a detective with the ability to enter people's memories; he takes on the case of a brilliant but troubled 16-year-old girl, Anna, to determine whether she is a sociopath or a victim of psychological trauma.

The world premiere was held at the 46th Sitges Film Festival on October 13, 2013, and received critical acclaim from audiences in its native Spain. Warner Bros. released the film in Spain on January 24, 2014. Elsewhere, the film received mixed to negative reviews and was a commercial failure. The film had its North American premiere at the Dallas International Film Festival on April 5, 2014. The film was retitled Anna for North America, where it was released through video on demand on May 6, 2014, and in a limited release on June 6, 2014, by Vertical Entertainment.

== Plot ==
Following top secret experiments, people called "viewers" have developed the psychic ability to enter people's memories. John Washington, a recent widower, is one such gifted individual. Washington works for Mindscape, the world's top memory detective agency, which offers the abilities of their psychic employees to help solve criminal cases, although their findings aren't yet recognized as evidence in court.

During a session that goes wrong, John suffers a stroke and is left incapacitated for two years. Financially ruined, he still owns the beach house where his wife died, but refuses to sell it. Desperate for money, he asks his old superior, Sebastian, for a new job. The case is that of a brilliant but troubled 16-year-old girl, Anna Greene, who is on a hunger strike. Her stepfather wants her sent to a mental institution, which Anna's mother and Anna herself are against. John is sent to end her hunger strike.

John and Anna begin their therapy sessions, focusing on Anna's time at a prestigious girls' school and several incidents that happened there. John finds himself drawn to Anna, while, at the same time wary of her. Anna's nurse, Judith, whom John has just started dating, is thrown off the staircase, and Anna is blamed. John harbors suspicions towards Anna's stepfather, who he believes has hired a man to shadow him, as well as toward Sebastian, who John learns has withheld a file on Anna from him. Anna's behavior toward John becomes more flirtatious, and she draws a portrait of him with the caption, "You are my only safe place."

John learns that Anna had been involved in a sexual relationship with her photography teacher, Tom Ortega, who took erotic pictures of her. However, when he interviews Ortega, who is now serving time in prison, he insists that Anna was the aggressor and set him up. John and Anna go back to an incident at the school where three of Anna's classmates were poisoned. Anna blames it on another student, nicknamed Mousey. However, when John interviews one of the poisoned girls, she says Mousey does not exist. Anna is able to regain his trust by showing him a photograph of herself and Mousey.

John and Anna recover an image of Sebastian approaching her as a four-year-old, which causes John to believe that Anna was sexually molested by Sebastian as a child. Sebastian however vehemently denies this, asking John why he would put him on the case if he had something like that to hide. John informs Anna's parents of his diagnosis and suggests they do not institutionalize their daughter. At home, John discovers that the note on Anna's portrait of him matches one supposedly written by Mousey on the photograph. Going through Anna's yearbook, he sees that the girl from Anna's memories was not nicknamed Mousey. Just then he gets a frantic phone call from Anna.

John races to her home to find that someone has broken in. From the home's security room, he sees Anna, distraught at discovering the murdered bodies of her parents, fleeing in panic from an unseen assailant. John calls the police but is told that someone else has already called them. He follows Anna into the woods. She tells him she is sorry, and runs away. The police arrest John for supposedly attacking Anna. There is blood on his hands and other evidence which seem to indicate that he broke into the home, drugged her parents, who are revealed to still be alive, then attacked Anna.

After being jailed, John is visited by the man who had been following him. It turns out that this man is another memory detective who has been conducting sessions with John to recover the truth about Anna. The memory detective concludes that Anna manipulated her own memories in order to frame John as her killer. She likely faked her own death in order to escape her parents, who she knew would never stop searching for her if she were alive. John apologizes to Sebastian, who promises to use this new information to secure John's release.

Elsewhere, Anna arranges to have John sent a single red rose, along with a picture of her holding a recent newspaper to show that she is still alive. John, now released from prison, drives to the beach house to find a new family has bought it. He is then able to move on with his life and find peace with Judith.

== Cast ==
- Mark Strong as John Washington
- Taissa Farmiga as Anna Greene
- Brian Cox as Sebastian Cunningham
- Saskia Reeves as Michelle Greene
- Richard Dillane as Robert
- Indira Varma as Judith Morrow
- Noah Taylor as Peter Lundgren
- Alberto Ammann as Tom Ortega
- Jessica Barden as Megan "Mousey" Scanlon
- Clare Calbraith as Jaime Feld
- Julio Perillán as Senator Rockford
- Rod Hallett as Detective Worner
- Sanny van Heteren as Samantha Harris
- Antonia Clarke as Susan Merrick
- Frida Palsson as Anna Washington
- Simon Cohen as Ralph

== Production ==
=== Development ===
In 2011, Jaume Collet-Serra set up Ombra Films with his friend Juan Solá. Mindscape is collaboration between Ombra and The Safran Company. Olivier Courson, from The Safran Company, said of the film, "We are delighted to see the first film out of Ombra Films starting to shoot. We strongly believe in our partnership with Jaume Collet-Serra, a very talented director and producer." The script was written by Guy Holmes.

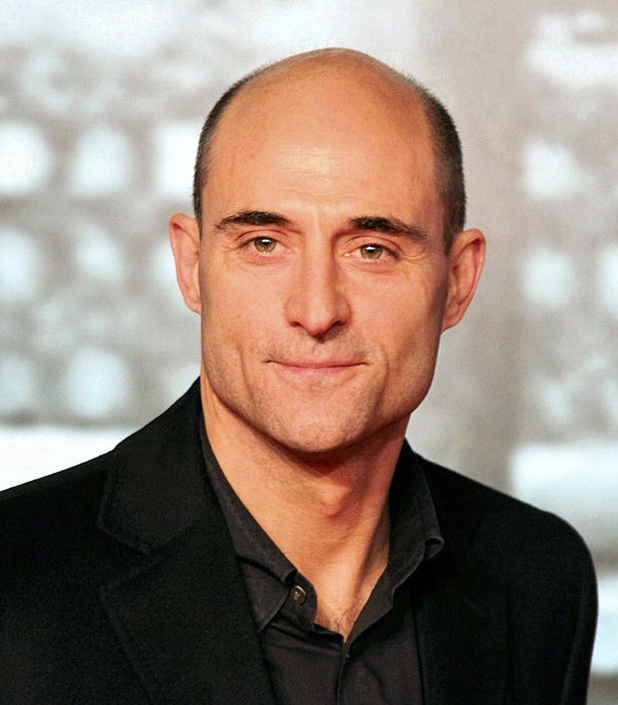
Strong plays John Washington

Mindscape is the first chapter in a collaboration between Ombra Films, The Safran Company and Antena 3 Films, in association with Miguel A. Faura for Roxbury Pictures, and with the participation of Televisió de Catalunya. The film was made on an estimated budget of $4.35 million. StudioCanal handled the film's distribution in the United Kingdom, France, and Germany, as well as its international sales. The film marked Jorge Dorado's feature film directorial debut. Dorado was previously a second-unit director known for a segment in 2007's Limonchello. Lucas Vidal composed the musical score.

=== Casting ===
The casting of Mark Strong, Taissa Farmiga, and Brian Cox in main roles was reported on October 17, 2012, the day after filming had begun. In an interview with Spanish film magazine Fotogramas, Strong said that the film is "a classic detective story, with some science-fiction elements." Dorado cited films such as Vertigo and Chinatown as inspirations, and said that the film is a "cryptic puzzle for the audience to solve."

=== Filming ===
Principal photography for the film began on October 16, 2012, in Madrid, Spain. Filming also took place in Barcelona and its surrounding areas; Dordogne, France; and Montreal, Quebec, Canada. In October 2012, the crew spent time filming on location at the Château d'Essendiéras in Dordogne. On January 3, 2014, Alain Bainée, the film's art director, was nominated at the Gaudí Awards for Best Production Director.

== Distribution ==
=== Marketing ===
In August 2013, Warner Bros. published the first official theatrical release poster. The film's first trailer was released on October 3, 2013. The second official theatrical release poster was released in October 2013, a few days before Sitges Film Festival. The English trailer was released on October 28, 2013.

=== Release ===
Mindscape celebrated its world premiere at the 46th Sitges Film Festival, opening the Official Fantàstic Competition on October 13, 2013. StudioCanal handled the film's distribution in the United Kingdom, France, and Germany, as well as its international sales, and financed the picture. The film subsequently screened at the Festival international du film fantastique de Gérardmer, the Glasgow Film Festival, and the Dallas International Film Festival.

Warner Bros. released the film in Spain on January 24, 2014. Vertical Entertainment picked up the thriller from StudioCanal on the eve of the European Film Market for North America. The film was re-titled Anna for its North American release. The film received a video on demand release on May 6, 2014, prior to being released in a limited release on June 6, 2014. Mindscape was released in Singapore on May 8, 2014, and in Japan on September 27, 2014. It was released in the United Kingdom on July 25, 2014, and had its television premiere there on December 29, 2015, on Film4.

=== Home media ===
The film was released on DVD and Blu-ray in Spain on June 3, 2014, and on DVD in the United States on August 5, 2014. A Blu-ray edition of the film has yet to be released in the United States. It was released on August 25, 2014, in the United Kingdom, on August 26, 2014, in the Netherlands, and on November 20, 2014, in Germany. As of April 2016, DVD sales in the United States totalled $69,043.

== Reception ==
=== Box office ===
Opening in 154 theaters, the film debuted with a weekend total of $397,978, with a per-theater average of $2,584 in its native Spain. On its second weekend, the film grossed $196,146, with a per-theater average of $1,211. As of August 1, 2014, the film has grossed $1,145,614. It was released in Singapore on May 8, 2014, and made a total of $72,586. Mindscape has made a total of $1,218,200 from Spain and Singapore's combined grosses.

The film was released through video on demand on May 6, 2014, and then in 15 theaters across the United States on June 6, 2014. It performed poorly at the box office; in its opening weekend, the film made $2,541. The film stayed in theaters for only one week, grossing $4,288 domestically. The film was released in the United Kingdom in July 2014, with box office totals only reaching $185. It made a total of $1,256,607 at the worldwide box office.

=== Critical response ===
Review aggregator website Rotten Tomatoes gave the film a 33% approval rating, based on 21 reviews, with an average rating of 4.90/10. On Metacritic it has a score of 42 out of 100, based on reviews from 7 critics, indicating "mixed or average reviews".

After the 46th Sitges Film Festival film critic Jordi Cierco from Fin de la Historia said that the film was an "intriguing thriller and [had a] good script." Shelagh Rowan-Legg from Screen Anarchy said, "It's an old-school Hitchcock-style thriller with some interesting sci-fi twists and a narrative reminiscent of films such as Vertigo, sustained by Dorado's assured direction and great performances by Mark Strong and Taissa Farmiga." COPE wrote, "The analysis of all its parts could not be more positive: novice filmmaker Jorge Dorado handles perfectly the technical complexity of his film, Taissa Farmiga is already a cult figure for fans of dark film, Lucas Vidal's band rebilled very solid sound, and photography [by] Óscar Faura is once again impressive." José Hernández, of the website Cineol, gave the film a mixed to positive review, giving it 3 stars out of 5. Hernández liked the "very well shot thriller, good cast and rhythm" but said the film is "very commercial, like Red Lights and Intruders."

Jonathan Holland from The Hollywood Reporter said, "An over-the-top B-movie concept, a satisfyingly twisty plotline and an intriguing central tandem are the hallmarks of a sharp-witted film that delivers all the traditional elements but which lacks the flair factor." Jose Manuel Cuéllar from ABC wrote, "It is a film executed with much talent. A debut feature that promises gold." La Vanguardia gave the film a score of 100%, with the site's consensus reading, "Mindscape is a film of ambiguities, of half truths, of entire lies. Specifically, it is a film of atmosphere. Where what it is, is not what seems: neither the pain of the investigator nor his salvation, nor the poor girl, victim or not." AlloCiné assigned the film a weighted average of 3.5 out of 5, stating, "The reason for which Mindscape managed to stand out at Sitges is because it is an irrefutably solvent product, which works with the precision of a clock and in which scarcely there are fissures that should not. The movie has a cocktail of references for movie fans, from the psychological cinema of M. Night Shyamalan to the mind games of Inception."

The performances of Strong and Farmiga received critical acclaim. Spain's oldest film magazine Fotogramas wrote that the best of the movie was "the relationship between the detective traumatized by a tragic past (Strong) and the femme fatale (hypnotic Farmiga, a teenager very Hannibal Lecter)." The magazine went on to state, "The film has marvellous equal protagonists." La Razón wrote, "Luck has befallen Jorge Dorado for having Strong's contained portrayal, which personifies this tireless seeker of sordid pasts, and for the hypnotic Farmiga, the precocious youngster with ambiguous and intelligent class, because between them they are able to grow in the climax of the film. The scenes [are] splashed with a slight eroticism and concentrate a good part of the promising thriller." However, the website went on to say that the story loses its footing in the final stretch, as it "leaves too many loose threads."

=== Accolades ===
Award	Category	Recipient(s)	Result	Ref.
Sitges Film Festival	Official Selection	Mindscape	Won	
Sitges Film Festival	Best Motion Picture	Mindscape	Nominated	
Gaudí Awards	Best Production Director	Alain Bainée	Nominated	
Goya Awards	Goya Award for Best New Director	Jorge Dorado	Nominated	
Brussels International Fantastic Film Festival	Golden Raven Statuette	Mindscape	Nominated	
Neox Fan Awards	Best Spanish Film of the Year	Mindscape	10th	
