= Mark Strong =

British actor (born 1963)

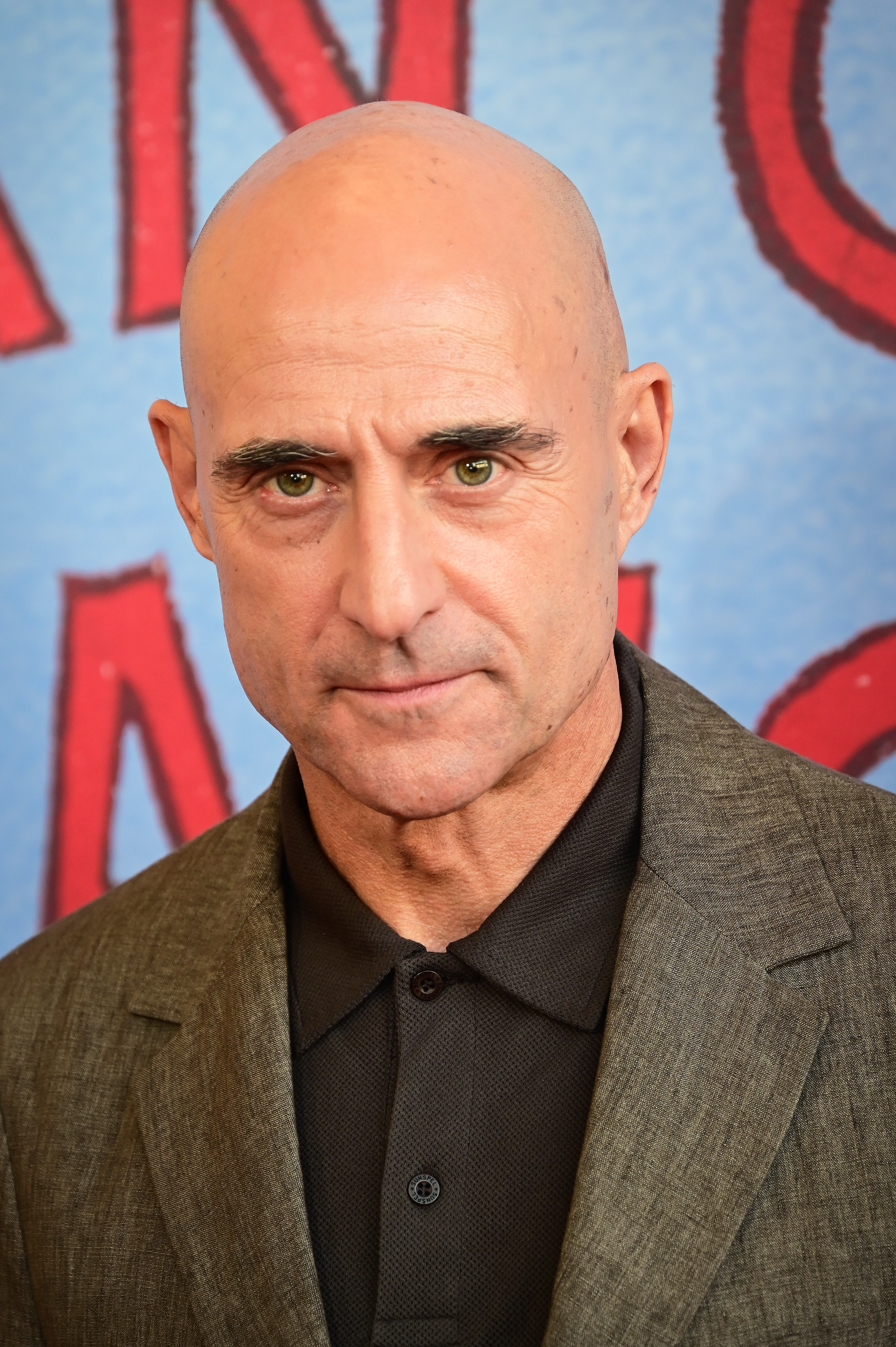
- Strong in 2026
- Born: Marco Giuseppe Salussolia; 5 August 1963 (age 63); London, England
- Education: Wymondham College; Royal Holloway, University of London; Bristol Old Vic Theatre School
- Occupation: Actor
- Years active: 1989–present
- Spouse: Liza Marshall
- Children: 2

Mark Strong (born Marco Giuseppe Salussolia; 5 August 1963) is an English actor. Strong is known for his starring roles on stage as well as for his villainous roles in historical dramas and franchise films. He has received accolades including a Laurence Olivier Award and a BAFTA TV Award as well as nominations for two Tony Awards, a Drama Desk Award and an Actor Award.

Strong's film roles include in Oliver Twist (2005), Sunshine (2007), Stardust (2007), Sherlock Holmes (2009), Kick-Ass (2010), Robin Hood (2010), Tinker Tailor Soldier Spy (2011), Zero Dark Thirty (2012), The Imitation Game (2014), 1917 (2019), and Cruella (2021). He has also taken roles in franchise films such as in Kingsman: The Secret Service (2014) and Kingsman: The Golden Circle (2017) and as Dr. Thaddeus Sivana in Shazam! (2019) and Shazam! Fury of the Gods (2023). On television, he played Terry "Tosker" Cox on the serial Our Friends in the North (1996), Carmine Falcone on The Penguin (2024), and Emperor Javicco Corrino on Dune: Prophecy (2024-present).

On stage, he played Orsino in a production of William Shakespeare's Twelfth Night (2002) which earned him a nomination for the Laurence Olivier Award for Best Performance in a Supporting Role. He portrayed a repressed longshoreman in the Arthur Miller play A View from the Bridge on the West End in 2014 and Broadway in 2015 which earned him the Laurence Olivier Award for Best Actor and nomination for the Tony Award for Best Actor in a Play respectively. He took on the title role in Robert Icke's adaptation of the Greek tragedy Oedipus in the West End in 2024 and Broadway in 2025, earning nominations for the Laurence Olivier Award for Best Actor and the Tony Award for Best Actor in a Play.

== Early life and education ==
Strong was born Marco Giuseppe Salussolia in the Islington borough of London on 5 August 1963, the son of an Austrian mother and an Italian father. His father left the family soon after Strong's birth, and Strong was brought up by his mother while she worked as an au pair. He later said, "The home I grew up in was a flat in Myddelton Square in London's Islington, a beautiful Georgian square with a huge church in the middle. We moved around a lot when I was young. I remember flats in Walthamstow, Clapton, Stoke Newington, and Edmonton." He said in 2008 that when he was a child he was inspired to become an actor by watching French actor Alain Delon, but clarified in 2019 that he did not consider acting as a career until he was older.

When Strong was young, his mother legally changed his name to help him fit in with his English peers. He was baptised a Catholic. He attended Wymondham College in Morley, Norfolk, where he sang in two punk bands, the Electric Hoax and Private Party—the latter's name based on the idea that people would not attend their shows, thinking they were private parties. Strong had ambitions to become a lawyer but returned to London after one year of studying German law at LMU Munich. He subsequently studied English and drama at Royal Holloway, University of London before attending the Bristol Old Vic Theatre School.

== Career ==
=== 1990–1999: Career beginnings ===
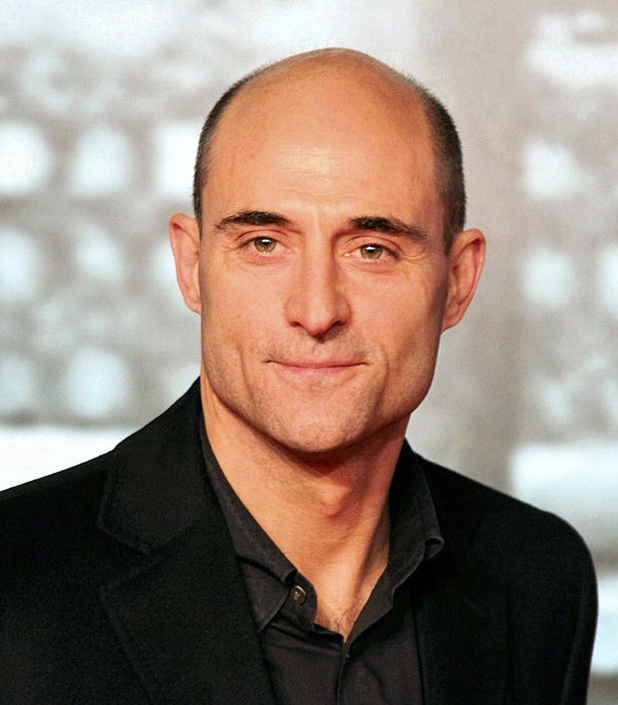
Strong at the Berlin premiere of Sherlock Holmes in 2010

Strong appeared in two Prime Suspect serials for ITV as Inspector (later Detective Chief Superintendent) Larry Hall, in Prime Suspect 3 (1993) and Prime Suspect 6 (2003). He also had starring roles in two BBC Two drama serials, Our Friends in the North (1996) and The Long Firm (2004), earning a BAFTA nomination for the latter. He also played the villainous Colonel Brand in Sharpe's Mission (1996). He portrayed the romantic lead, Mr. Knightley, in the 1996 ITV adaptation of Jane Austen's novel Emma. He then played the role of Steve in the 1997 film adaptation of Nick Hornby's Fever Pitch. He dubbed Daniel Craig's voice in the 1997 German-language film Obsession.

At the beginning of the 2000s, Strong appeared in Heartlands and in Shakespeare's Twelfth Night at the Donmar Warehouse, for which he was nominated for the 2003 Laurence Olivier Award for Best Performance in a Supporting Role. He was later featured in Roman Polanski's Oliver Twist (2005), played Mussawi in the film Syriana (2005), and played an assassin named Sorter in Revolver (2005). He portrayed the traitorous Wictred in Tristan & Isolde, showing his talent with swordplay, and from 2006 until 2012 he provided the narration in the BBC's genealogy series Who Do You Think You Are?.

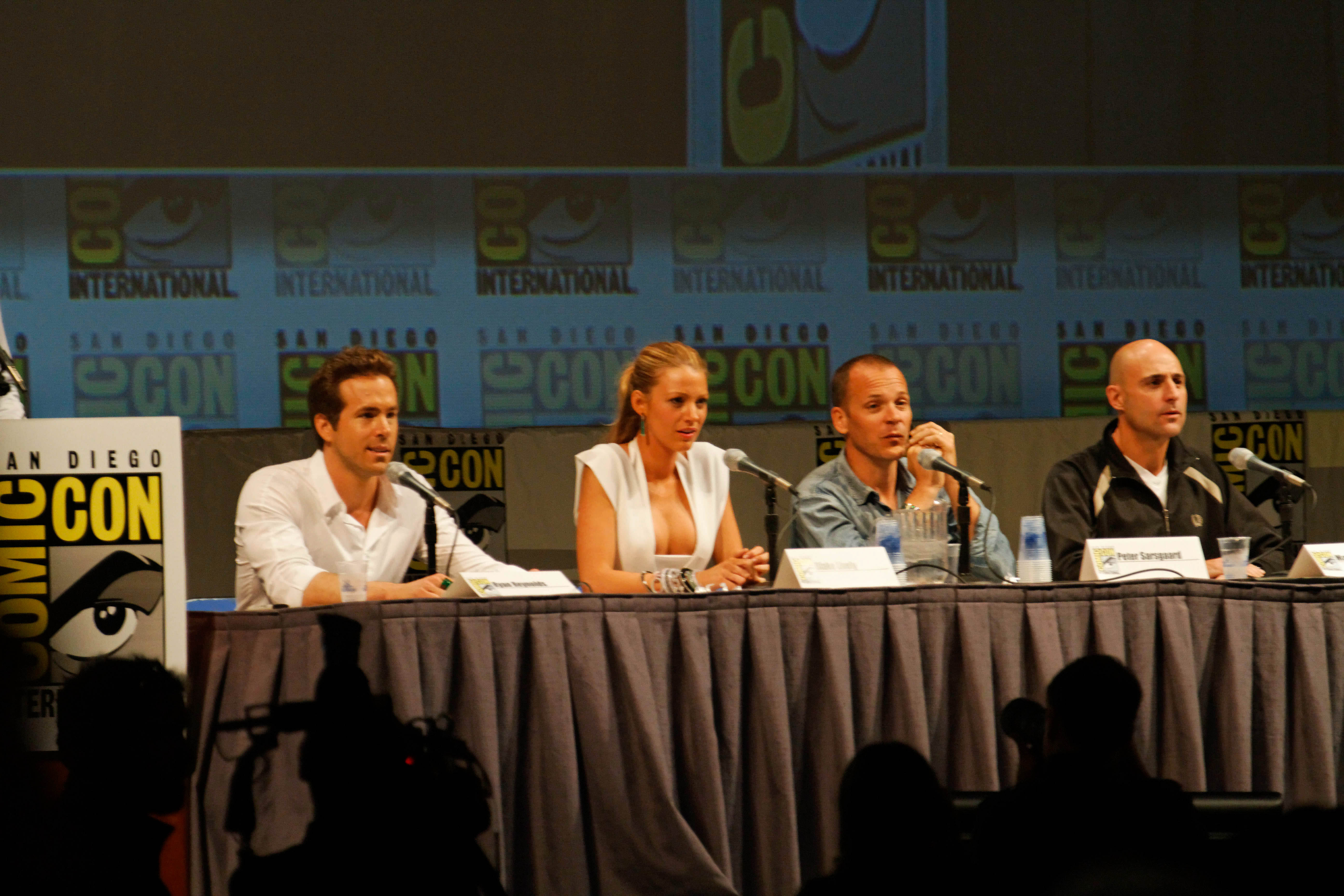
Strong with the cast of Green Lantern at the 2010 San Diego Comic-Con

=== 2007–2014: Villain roles for film ===
Despite the persistence of rumours, Strong maintains that he was never offered the part of Anton Chigurh in the 2007 film No Country for Old Men. That year he played Pinbacker, the insane captain of Icarus I in Sunshine. Also in 2007, he portrayed Prince Septimus, the youngest of the seven Stormhold princes, in Stardust. In 2008, he played Nick Calderelli in Miss Pettigrew Lives for a Day, Mannie Miesel in Flashbacks of a Fool, Finn in Babylon A.D., Archy in RocknRolla, and Philipp Bouhler in Good. Also in 2008, he portrayed Hani Salaam, the Jordanian intelligence chief and director of the feared GID in Body of Lies, marking his first collaboration with English director Ridley Scott. Strong's performance as Hani Salaam earned him a nomination for the London Critics Circle Film Award for Best British Supporting Actor, and his performance was mentioned by several critics, with Scott calling it "a marvel of exotic suavity and cool insinuation" while Ebert "particularly admired" his aura of suave control.

In 2009, Strong played a lead part in the Channel 4 film Endgame, and he played Lord Blackwood, the main villain, in Sherlock Holmes, who has somehow returned after his execution with a plot to take over the British Empire using an arsenal of dark arts and new technologies. It was his third project with director Guy Ritchie. He went on to work with Ridley Scott a second time in the 2010 epic adventure film Robin Hood, portraying antagonist Sir Godfrey. That year, he also played Frank D'Amico, the head of a criminal organisation, in Kick-Ass. Strong says he is drawn to playing antagonists, trying to "understand the purpose of the character" and building a believable individual.

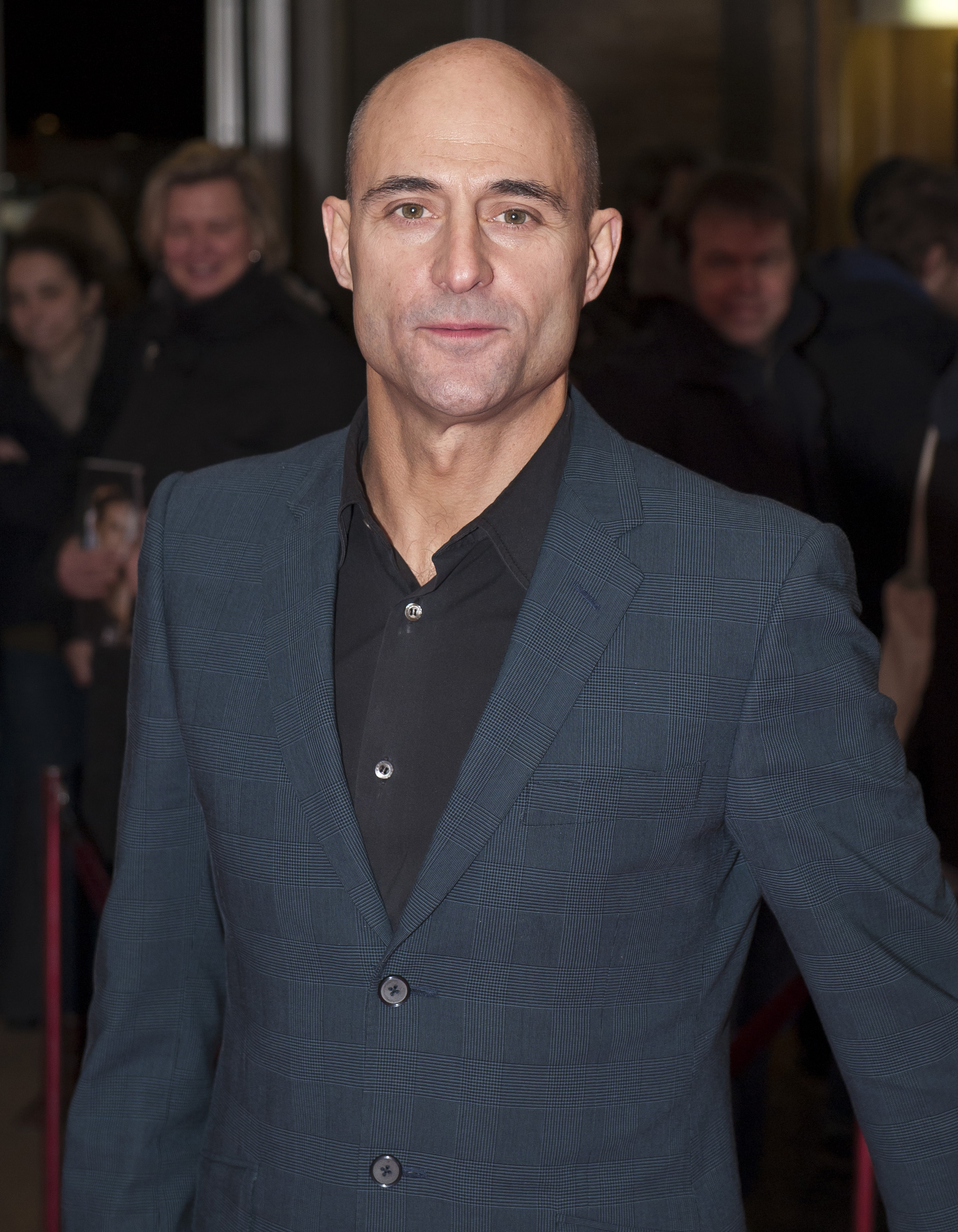
Strong at the 2011 Berlin International Film Festival

In 2011, Strong played Thaal Sinestro, a Green Lantern and Hal Jordan's mentor, in the superhero film Green Lantern. Strong said the film "closely follows the early comics" and elaborated, "Sinestro starts out as Hal Jordan's mentor, slightly suspicious and not sure of him." Strong went on to state that the character "is a military guy but isn't immediately bad". He also revealed that the outfit and other aspects of the character closely follow his early comic history. Also in 2011, he voiced Pod in The Secret World of Arrietty and Captain Titus of the Ultramarines Chapter in the video game Warhammer 40,000: Space Marine. The same year, Strong played Jim Prideaux in the film adaptation of Tinker Tailor Soldier Spy, which was earlier played by Ian Bannen in the 1979 series. The film premiered in competition at the 68th Venice International Film Festival on 5 September 2011.

Strong played Clive Cornell in The Guard (2011), which is the most successful independent Irish film of all time in terms of Irish box-office receipts, overtaking The Wind that Shakes the Barley (2006). He next portrayed the role of Jacob Sternwood in the British thriller Welcome to the Punch. He played Matai Shang, the leader of the Therns in John Carter (2012), and starred in the action thriller film Zero Dark Thirty (2012). The film had its premiere in Los Angeles on 19 December 2012 and had its wide release on 11 January 2013. The film received wide critical acclaim and was nominated for five Academy Awards, including Best Picture.

In November 2012, Strong was cast in Mindscape, a film in which a man with the ability to enter people's memories begins working on the case of a brilliant but problematic teenager to determine whether she is a sociopath or the victim of trauma. The film came to American cinemas in June 2014. Jaguar Cars produced an advertisement in 2014, initially shown during Super Bowl XLVIII and later online and on television, featuring Strong alongside fellow English actors Ben Kingsley and Tom Hiddleston. It was themed around their recent film roles as villains, and used the tagline "it's good to be bad". That same year, Strong co-starred in the historical drama film The Imitation Game as MI6 chief Stewart Menzies.

=== 2015–present: Broadway debut and other work ===
In 2015, Strong won the Olivier Award for Best Actor for his role in A View from the Bridge, which he starred in as Eddie Carbone at the Young Vic. When Strong went over to perform the play on Broadway in New York, he received similar levels of acclaim, and was nominated for the Drama Desk Award for Outstanding Actor in a Play and the Tony Award for Best Actor in a Play for his performance. In 2016, he co-starred with Sacha Baron Cohen in the action-comedy film Grimsby, playing a top MI6 secret agent with Cohen as his idiotic football hooligan brother. Later that year, he starred in a production of The Red Barn, by David Hare, which premiered in October 2016 at the National Theatre, (Lyttelton Stage), and co-starred in the political thriller Miss Sloane, directed by John Madden. The film premiered at the AFI Film Festival in November 2016.

Since 2017, Strong has narrated the pre-show etiquette clips presented before films at Vue Cinemas. In 2018, he starred in the hostage thriller Stockholm, and had the leading role in Fox network's Deep State, an espionage thriller in which he portrays an ex-spy named Max Easton, who after the death of his son, is brought out of retirement unwillingly, to avenge his death. In 2019, he portrayed the villain Doctor Thaddeus Sivana in the superhero film Shazam!. In the same year, Strong appeared briefly as the British Captain Smith in Sam Mendes’ World War I film 1917. In March 2020, Strong narrated public information films for the UK government which outlined how the British public should approach daily life during the COVID-19 pandemic. In March 2021, Strong was the castaway on BBC Radio 4's Desert Island Discs. Later that same year, he co-starred in the Disney comedy-drama film Cruella.

== In the media ==
GQ magazine named Strong as one of its 50 best dressed men in 2015. He has named David Bowie as his style icon.

== Personal life ==
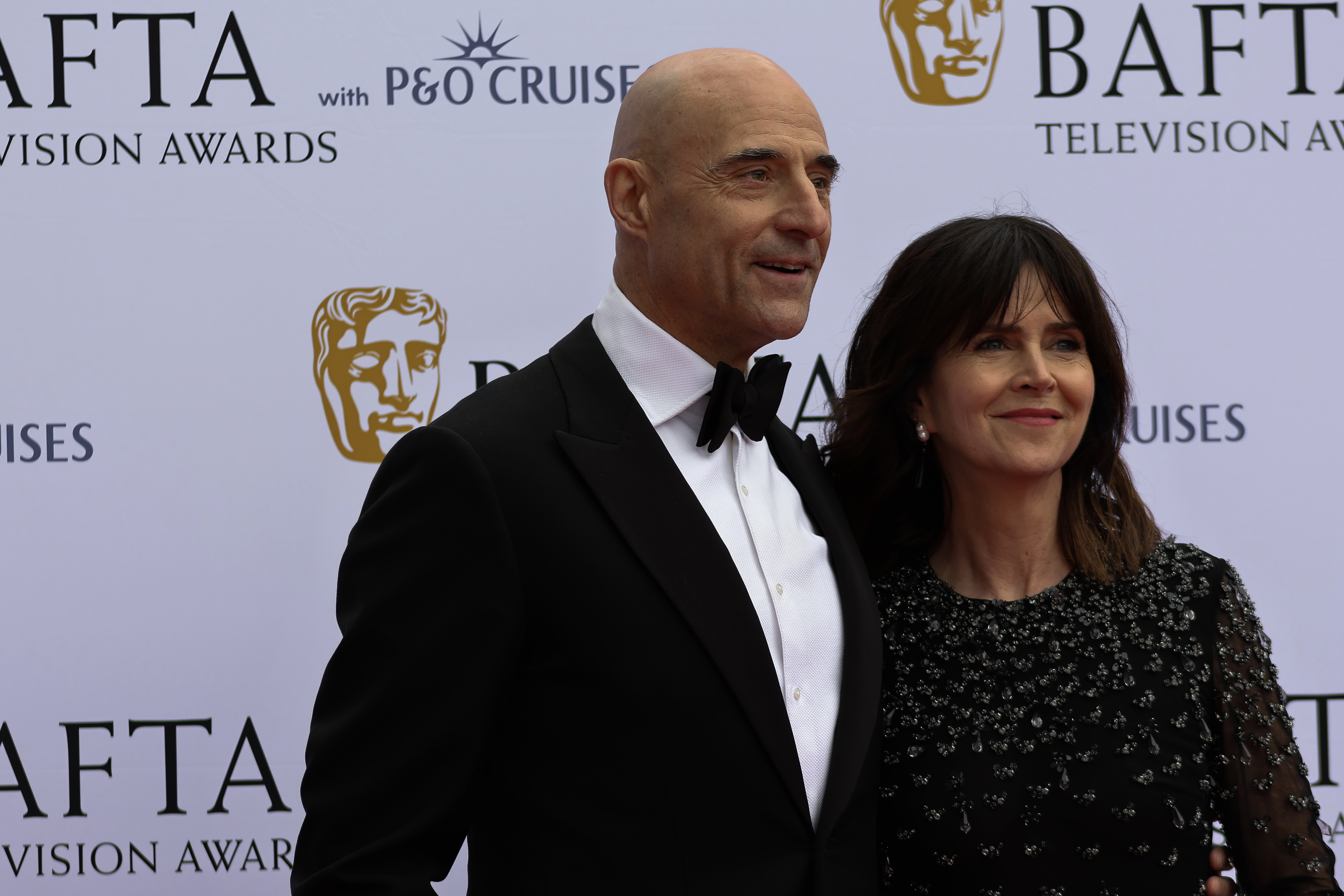
Strong and Marshall in 2026

Strong is married to television producer Liza Marshall, with whom he has two sons: Gabriel and Roman. They live in North London, which Strong discussed in 2007: "I've got no desire to live anywhere else. I was born here, my wife was born here, my kids were born here, and this is where we're going to stay. [...] I'm able to keep my head below the parapet. I get on with my work, I have a family, and I get on the Tube. It just so happens that I'm doing this job."

Strong is a lifelong fan of Arsenal F.C. and started attending games when he was seven years old. He has named Ace in the Hole, Blade Runner, His Girl Friday, The Night of the Hunter, This Is Spinal Tap, and the work of the Coen brothers as his favourite films. He speaks fluent German and some Italian, and provided the German dubbing in scenes from the film Obsession in which Daniel Craig's character speaks German with an English accent. He and Craig previously lived together, became friends, and co-starred in the BBC drama Our Friends in the North. Craig is also the godfather of Strong's son Roman.

== Acting credits ==
=== Film ===
Key
†	Denotes films that have not yet been released

Year	Title	Role	Director	Notes	Ref.
1993	Century	Policeman	Stephen Poliakoff		
1994	Captives	Kenny	Angela Pope		
1997	Fever Pitch	Steve	David Evans		
1997	Obsession	John MacHale (voice)	Peter Sehr	Voice role (Note: Dubbed Daniel Craig's German dialogue)	
1998	The Man with Rain in His Shoes	Dave Summers	Maria Ripoll		
1999	Elephant Juice	Frank	Sam Miller		
1999	Sunshine	István Sors	István Szabó		
2001	To End All Wars	Dusty Miller	David L. Cunningham		
2001	Hotel	Ferdinand	Mike Figgis		
2001	The Martins	Doug	Tony Grounds		
2001	Superstition	Antonio Gabrieli	Kenneth Hope		
2002	Heartlands	Ian	Damien O'Donnell		
2003	It's All About Love	Arthur	Thomas Vinterberg		
2005	Revolver	Sorter	Guy Ritchie		
2005	Oliver Twist	Toby Crackit	Roman Polanski		
2005	Syriana	Mussawi	Stephen Gaghan		
2006	Tristan & Isolde	Lord Wictred	Kevin Reynolds		
2006	Scenes of a Sexual Nature	Louis	Ed Blum		
2007	Sunshine	Pinbacker	Danny Boyle		
2007	Stardust	Prince Septimus	Matthew Vaughn		
2008	Miss Pettigrew Lives for a Day	Nick Calderelli	Bharat Nalluri		
2008	Flashbacks of a Fool	Mannie Miesel	Baillie Walsh		
2008	Babylon A.D.	Finn	Mathieu Kassovitz		
2008	RocknRolla	Archy	Guy Ritchie		
2008	Body of Lies	Hani Salaam	Ridley Scott		
2008	Good	Philipp Bouhler	Vicente Amorim		
2009	Endgame	Neil Barnard	Pete Travis		
2009	The Young Victoria	Sir John Conroy	Jean-Marc Vallée		
2009	Sherlock Holmes	Lord Henry Blackwood	Guy Ritchie		
2010	Kick-Ass	Frank D'Amico	Matthew Vaughn		
2010	Robin Hood	Sir Godfrey	Ridley Scott		
2010	The Way Back	Andrei Khabarov	Peter Weir		
2011	The Guard	Clive Cornell	John Michael McDonagh		
2011	The Eagle	Guern / Lucius Caius Metellus	Kevin Macdonald		
2011	Green Lantern	Thaal Sinestro	Martin Campbell		
2011	Arrietty	Pod (voice)	Hiromasa Yonebayashi	UK English dub	
2011	Tinker Tailor Soldier Spy	Jim Prideaux	Tomas Alfredson		
2011	Black Gold	Sultan Amar	Jean-Jacques Annaud		
2012	John Carter	Matai Shang	Andrew Stanton		
2012	Zero Dark Thirty	George	Kathryn Bigelow		
2013	Welcome to the Punch	Jacob Sternwood	Eran Creevy		
2013	Justin and the Knights of Valour	Heraclio (voice)	Manuel Sicilia		
2013	Blood	Robert Seymour	Nick Murphy		
2014	Unity	Narrator (voice)	Shaun Monson	Documentary	
2014	Closer to the Moon	Max Rosenthal	Nae Caranfil		
2014	Before I Go to Sleep	Dr. Nasch	Rowan Joffe		
2014	Mindscape	John Washington	Jorge Dorado		
2014	The Imitation Game	Stewart Menzies	Morten Tyldum		
2014	Kingsman: The Secret Service	Merlin	Matthew Vaughn		
2016	Grimsby	Sebastian Graves	Louis Leterrier		
2016	Approaching the Unknown	Captain William Stanaforth	Mark Elijah Rosenberg		
2016	The Siege of Jadotville	Conor Cruise O'Brien	Richie Smyth		
2016	Miss Sloane	Rodolfo Schmidt	John Madden		
2017	6 Days	Max Vernon	Toa Fraser		
2017	Kingsman: The Golden Circle	Merlin	Matthew Vaughn		
2018	The Catcher Was a Spy	Werner Heisenberg	Ben Lewin		
2018	Stockholm	Gunnar Sorensson	Robert Budreau		
2019	Shazam!	Thaddeus Sivana	David F. Sandberg		
2019	1917	Captain Smith	Sam Mendes		
2021	Cruella	John	Craig Gillespie		
2021	Charlotte	Alfred Wolfsohn (voice)	Tahir Rana, Éric Warin		
2022	Tár	Eliot Kaplan	Todd Field		
2022	Nocebo	Felix	Lorcan Finnegan		
2023	Shazam! Fury of the Gods	Thaddeus Sivana	David F. Sandberg	Cameo appearance	
2023	Murder Mystery 2	Miller	Jeremy Garelick		
2023	Dead Shot	Holland	Charles Guard, Thomas Guard		
2023	The Critic	David Brooke	Anand Tucker		
2023	The End We Start From	N	Mahalia Belo	Also executive producer	
2024	Atlas	General Jake Boothe	Brad Peyton		
2024	The Silent Hour	Detective Doug Slater	Brad Anderson		
2025	Shadow Force	Jack Cinder	Joe Carnahan		
TBA	Cry to Heaven	Cardinal Calvino	Tom Ford	Post-production	

=== Television ===
Year	Title	Role	Notes	Ref.
1989	EastEnders	Telephone Engineer	1 episode	
1989	After Henry	Roger	Episode: "Wedding Bells"	
1990	The Bill	P.C. Gibb	Episode: "A Clean Division"	
1990	Inspector Morse	Mike Butterworth	Episode: "Masonic Mysteries"	
1990	TECX	Eberhard Braun	Episode: "A Question of Chemistry"	
1993	Prime Suspect 3	Inspector Larry Hall	2 episodes	
1993	The Buddha of Suburbia	Second TV Producer	2 episodes	
1994	Between the Lines	David Lacey	Episode: "A Face in the Crowd"	
1995	Kavanagh QC	Randall	Episode: "The Sweetest Thing"	
1996	Emma	George Knightley	TV movie	
1996	Our Friends in the North	Terry "Tosker" Cox	Limited series	
1996	Sharpe	Colonel Brand	Episode: Sharpe's Mission	
1997	Band of Gold	Ed Smithson	3 episodes	
1998	Spoonface Steinberg	Father	Limited series	
1999	Trust	Michael Mitcham	Limited series	
2000	Bomber	Col. Chris Forsyth	Limited series	
2000	Anna Karenina	Stiva Oblonsky	Limited series	
2002	The Jury	Len Davies	Limited series	
2003	Prime Suspect 6: The Last Witness	Det. Chief Supt. Larry Hall	1 episode	
2003	Henry VIII	Duke of Norfolk	Limited series	
2004	The Long Firm	Harry Starks	Limited series	
2006	Low Winter Sun	Det. Sgt. Frank Agnew	2 episodes	
2006–2012	Who Do You Think You Are?	Narrator (voice)	Main role	
2013	Low Winter Sun	Det. Sgt. Frank Agnew	Main role, 10 episodes	
2013	The Great Martian War 1913–1917	Narrator (voice)	Documentary	
2018	Deep State	Max Easton	Main role, 8 episodes	
2018	Untamed Romania	Narrator (voice)	Documentary	
2019	The Dark Crystal: Age of Resistance	Ordon (voice)	4 episodes	
2019–2021	Temple	Daniel Milton	Main role, 15 episodes; Also executive producer	
2020	Home Game	Narrator (voice)	Documentary series; 8 episodes	
2024	The Legend of Vox Machina	Trent Ikithon (voice)	Episode: Cloak and Dagger	
2024	Dune: Prophecy	Emperor Javicco Corrino	Main role, 5 episodes	
2024	The Penguin	Carmine Falcone	Limited series	
2025	Nine Perfect Strangers	David	Main role (season 2)	
2025	The Mighty Nein	Trent Ikithon (voice)		
TBA	Neuromancer	Armitage	In production	

=== Theatre ===
Year	Title	Role	Venue	Ref.
1986–1987	Love's Labour's Lost	Performer	Bristol Old Vic, Bristol	
1988–1989	The Man Who Came to Dinner	Performer	Barbican Centre, London	
1988–1992	Fuenteovejuna	Captain Flores	Royal National Theatre, London	
1989	Richard III	Performer	Barbican Centre, London	
1989	Henry VI, Part 1	Bastard of Orleans	Barbican Centre, London	
1989	Edward IV	Performer	Barbican Centre, London	
1989	The Man Who Came to Dinner	Sandy	Barbican Centre, London	
1989	H.I.D.	Officer	Almeida Theatre, London	
1990	Richard III	First Murderer / Lord Lovel / Duke of Norfolk	Royal National Theatre, London	
1990	King Lear	First Servant / Captain	Royal National Theatre, London	
1991	Napoli Milionaria	Errico	Royal National Theatre, London	
1991–1992	Murmuring Judges	DC Barry Hopper	Royal National Theatre, London	
1994	Johnny On a Spot	Nicky Allen	Royal National Theatre, London	
1996–1997	Death of a Salesman	Biff Loman	Royal National Theatre, London	
1996–1997	Death of a Salesman	Biff Loman	Theatre Royal, Bath	
1997	Closer	Dan Woolf (replacement)	Royal National Theatre, London	
1998	The Iceman Cometh	Rocky Pioggi	Almeida Theatre, London	
1999–2000	Speed-the-Plow	Bobby Gould	Theatre Royal, Bath	
2000	Speed-the-Plow	Bobby Gould	New Ambassadors Theatre, London	
2000	Speed-the-Plow	Bobby Gould	Duke of York's Theatre, London	
2002	Twelfth Night	Orsino	Donmar Warehouse, London	
2002	Uncle Vanya	Mikhail Lvovich Astrov	Donmar Warehouse, London	
2014–2016	A View from the Bridge	Eddie Carbone	Wyndham's Theatre, London	
2014–2016	A View from the Bridge	Eddie Carbone	Young Vic, London	
2015–2016	A View from the Bridge	Eddie Carbone	Lyceum Theatre, New York	
2016–2017	The Red Barn	Donald Dodd	Royal National Theatre, London	
2024–2025	Oedipus	Oedipus	Wyndham's Theatre, London	
2025–2026	Oedipus	Oedipus	Studio 54, New York	

=== Radio ===
Year	Title	Role	Notes	Ref.
2021	Desert Island Discs	Himself		

=== Video games ===
Year	Title	Role	Ref.
2010	Kick-Ass: The Game	Frank D'Amico	
2011	Warhammer 40,000: Space Marine	Captain Titus of the Ultramarines	
2013	Total War: Rome II	Silanus	
2016	Eisenhorn: Xenos	Inquisitor Gregor Eisenhorn	
2018	Battlefield V	Single Player Narrator	
2021	The Artful Escape	Stargordon	
TBA	Squadron 42	Captain Thomas Wade	

== Awards and nominations ==
Year	Association	Category	Work	Result	Ref.
2005	BAFTA TV Award	Best Actor	The Long Firm	Nominated	
2011	Central Ohio Film Critics Association	Best Cast	Tinker Tailor Soldier Spy	Won	
2014	Critic's Circle Theatre Award	Best Actor	A View from the Bridge	Won	
2025	Critic's Circle Theatre Award	Best Actor	Oedipus	Won	
2026	Dorian Award	Outstanding Lead Performance in a Broadway Play	Oedipus	Nominated	
2016	Drama Desk Award	Outstanding Actor in a Play	A View from the Bridge	Nominated	
2011	Georgia Film Critics Association	Best Cast	Tinker Tailor Soldier Spy	Won	
2014	Gopo Award	Best Actor in a Leading Role	Closer to the Moon	Nominated	
2003	Laurence Olivier Awards	Best Actor in a Supporting Role	Twelfth Night	Nominated	
2015	Laurence Olivier Awards	Best Actor	A View from the Bridge	Won	
2025	Laurence Olivier Awards	Best Actor	Oedipus	Nominated	
2008	London Film Critics Circle Awards	Best British Supporting Actor	Body of Lies	Nominated	
2009	MTV Movie Award	Best Fight	Sherlock Holmes (with Robert Downey, Jr.)	Nominated	
2010	MTV Movie Award	Best Fight	Kick-Ass (with Chloë Grace Moretz)	Nominated	
2016	Outer Critics Circle Award	Outstanding Actor in a Play	A View from the Bridge	Nominated	
2014	Palm Springs International Film Festival	Best Ensemble	The Imitation Game	Won	
2014	San Diego Film Critics Society	Best Ensemble	The Imitation Game	Nominated	
2014	Screen Actors Guild Award	Outstanding Cast in a Motion Picture	The Imitation Game	Nominated	
2019	Teen Choice Award	Choice Movie Villain	Shazam!	Nominated	
2016	Theatre World Award	Distinguished Performance	A View from the Bridge	Won	
2016	Tony Awards	Best Actor in a Play	A View from the Bridge	Nominated	
2026	Tony Awards	Best Actor in a Play	Oedipus	Nominated	
