= Stefanos Lazaridis =

British stage designer (1942–2010)

- Born: 28 July 1942 (age 83); Dire Dawa
- Citizenship: Ethiopia
- Occupation(s): Scenographer, Director, Costume designer

Lazaridis in his later years

Stefanos Lazaridis (28 July 1942 – 8 May 2010) was a British stage designer, best known for his work in opera. Originally intended for a business career, he studied stage design in London, and was quickly in demand in theatres and opera houses, working with John Copley and other directors.

Originally his style was lavish and naturalistic, but he changed to a less traditional style, working with David Pountney and other more avant garde directors at English National Opera and elsewhere.

He occasionally directed operas, and was for a short time director of the Greek National Opera.

== Life and career ==
Lazaridis was born in Dire Dawa, Ethiopia, son of a prosperous expatriate Greek businessman, Nicholas Lazaridis. He was educated at the Greek School in Addis Ababa and the Ecole Internationale in Geneva. In 1962 he went to London to take a course in business administration, but instead enrolled at the Byam Shaw School of Art in Kensington and later transferred to the Central School of Speech and Drama where he studied theatre design. His fellow Greek, the designer Nicholas Georgiadis, took him on as an apprentice, and he designed his first theatre production in Guildford in 1967, Tennessee Williams's Eccentricities of a Nightingale. He attracted attention for his designs for Antony Tudor's "Knight Errant" for The Royal Ballet's touring company in 1968, and was invited to design a new production of Carmen for the director John Copley at Sadler's Wells Opera in 1970.

Lazaridis's early designs were naturalistic and lavish, and suited Copley's approach to production. They worked together both at English National Opera (ENO) (The Seraglio, 1971, Il trovatore, 1972) and Covent Garden (Le nozze di Figaro, 1971, Don Giovanni, 1973). In the 1980s, Lazaridis worked a great deal with David Pountney at ENO. His design style moved away from opulent naturalism, and embraced Pountney's non-naturalistic approach. Pountney later wrote,

Nowadays it is quite common for designers to direct, and, to be honest, most of them can't. Stefan couldn't direct either – he did try once or twice – but his great significance as a designer is that he always designed as a director. You could also say that he designed as a dramaturg – the interpretation of which would be that for him the idea of the staging was always a greater priority than the way it looked: that would logically follow once the idea was clear.

Lazaridis designed more than 30 productions for ENO. Pountney rated among the best of them Rusalka, Hansel and Gretel, Dr Faustus and Lady Macbeth of Mtsensk, the last of them set in a meat-packing factory. Other directors with whom Lazaridis worked were Nicholas Hytner, Patrick Garland, Colin Graham, Tim Albery and Phyllida Lloyd. Not all his productions were well received. The Times described his set for an ENO Tosca as "one of the ugliest and drabbest ever devised for Tosca." Together with the director Steven Pimlott, Lazaridis presented a 1989 Carmen in the vast Earls Court arena in London, which The Times considered "a new benchmark in the intelligent popularisation of opera.".

With Pountney, Lazaridis worked on three lake-stage productions for the Bregenz Festival, Der fliegende Holländer (1989), Nabucco (1991) and Fidelio (1995). Pountney called Lazaridis's designs for these productions "astonishing … The opportunity to work on this scale somehow triggered Stefan's most sensitive dramaturgical instincts, allied to his phenomenal aesthetic sense and understanding of scale."

Away from opera, Lazaridis designed productions of a wide range of plays from a show about the Mitford sisters to Ibsen dramas and Shakespeare comedy. In 1993 he directed and designed the Duran Duran tour of the U.S.

Among Lazaridis's later designs for the opera house was the Covent Garden Ring cycle (2004–06) directed by Keith Warner, of which The Guardian wrote, "Warner and Lazaridis can't decide if the Ring is heroic myth, political allegory, or human story. Instead, they cram the stage with a vast range of imagery, from the uninspired video art which depicts Siegfried's journey on the Rhine, to the surrealist kitsch of the Gibichung Hall and the dark naturalism of the hunt scene."

Between 2006 and 2007 Lazaridis was artistic director and general manager of the Greek National Opera; he found himself frustrated in his attempts to vitalise the company, and resigned. Pountney observed, "the Greeks have themselves to blame that they squandered such an astounding talent."

National Life Stories conducted an interview (C1173/28) with Lazaridis in 2007 for An Oral History of Theatre Design collection held by the British Library.

Lazaridis died of cancer at the age of 67. He was survived by Tim Williams, his partner of 47 years.
