= Chris Rapley =

British scientist and scientific administrator

Chris Rapley CBE
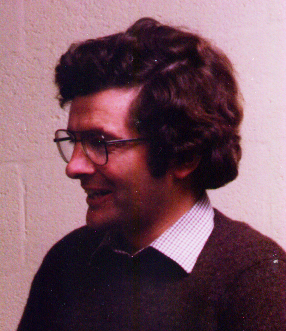
- Rapley in 1980
- Born: 8 April 1947 (age 79)
- Education: King Edward's School, Bath
- Alma mater: Jesus College, Oxford; University of Manchester; University College London
- Occupations: Scientist, NASA Solar Maximum Mission, 1975 and 1981 Lecturer, Department of Space and Climate Physics, University College London, 1981-1987; Professor, Remote Sensing Science at University College London, 1991-1997; Director, British Antarctic Survey, 1998-2007 Director, Science Museum, 2007-2010
- Spouse: Norma Khan
- Children: 2

Christopher Graham Rapley CBE (born 8 April 1947) is a British scientist and scientific administrator. He is emeritus Professor of Climate Science at University College London, a member of the Academia Europaea, a member of the UK Clean Growth Fund Advisory Board, and a member of the UK Parliamentary and Scientific Committee. His previous posts include Director of the Science Museum, London, Director of the British Antarctic Survey, Chair of the European Science Foundation's European Space Sciences Committee, Chairman of the London Climate Change Partnership, President of the Scientific Committee on Antarctic Research, Vice President of the European Science Foundation's European Polar Board, executive director of the International Geosphere-Biosphere Programme, and Director of UCL Mullard Space Science Laboratory's (MSSL) Remote Sensing Group.

== Life and career ==
Born on 8 April 1947, Rapley was educated at King Edward's School, Bath, Jesus College, Oxford (obtaining a BA in Physics in 1969), Manchester University, Jodrell Bank (obtaining a MSc in Radio Astronomy in 1976) and University College, London (obtaining a PhD in X-ray Astronomy in 1976).

Rapley married Norma Khan in 1970 and they have twin daughters, Emma Jane and Charlotte Anne.

In the 1970s he was instrument scientist on two Skylark sounding rocket payloads flown from Woomera, Australia to study the Soft X-ray Diffuse Background, on four Aerobee flights from White Sands, New Mexico in collaboration with the Lockheed Missile and Space Co's (LMSC) Palo Alto research laboratory to test a new design of solar X-ray spectrometer. He was instrument scientist for the Bent Crystal Spectrometer and Flat Crystal Spectrometer detector package flown on NASA's Solar Maximum Mission as part of the X-Ray Polychromator provided by UCL MSSL, LMSC and the Rutherford Appleton Laboratory.

Between 1975 and 1981, Rapley was a scientist on NASA's Solar Maximum Mission, and was then a lecturer at the Department of Space and Climate Physics of University College London from 1981 to 1987. He was professor of Remote Sensing Science at University College London from 1991 to 1997.

In 1994 whilst on a sabbatical at NASA's Jet Propulsion Laboratory he contributed to the design of the Cassini RADAR instrument to study Saturn's largest moon, Titan. He led numerous ESA-funded studies on the use of radar altimeters to study Earth's polar ice, land and inland water, underpinning the ESA Earth Observation satellite series ERS-1, ERS-2, and Envisat. The MSSL group provided the on-board calibration sources for the UK Along-Track Scanning Radiometer flown on the same spacecraft. He was Chair of the International Council of Science - World Meteorological Organisation's International Planning Group for the International Polar Year 2007-2008 and a member of the IPY Steering Committee.

From 1995 to 1997 he was executive director of the International Geosphere-Biosphere Programme, heading up the Secretariat hosted by the Royal Swedish Academy of Sciences in Stockholm.

He was Director of the British Antarctic Survey from 1998 to 2007. During his time as Director, he helped Al Gore with the "Live Earth" concert (7 July 2007) by arranging for the Rothera Research Station's in-house band, Nunatak, to perform in Antarctica as part of the event.

Rapley became a Fellow of St Edmund's College, Cambridge in 1999. He was awarded a CBE in 2003. In 2007, he was appointed as Director of the Science Museum. where he was instrumental in the creation of the 'atmosphere' climate science gallery, the first of its kind in a major museum.

From 2012 to 2016 he was a member, then chair, of the European Space Agency Director General's High-Level Science Policy Advisory Committee. In 2020 he was appointed Chair of the European Science Foundation's European Space Sciences Committee, and in 2022 was appointed as a member of the European Space Agency Director General's High Level Advisory Group on the Human and Robotic Space Exploration for Europe. His current interests are in the role of climate scientists in society, the communication of climate science and the need to better balance the discovery of new facts about the climate system and the delivery of actionable information and benefit to society. Addressing this goal, from 2010 - 2019 he was Chair of the UCL Policy Commission on Communicating Climate Science, and more recently (until mid 2025) Chair of the UCL Climate Action Unit which seeks to help institutions overcome obstacles to establish their 'agency to act' on climate change.

=== Portrait ===
Rapley agreed to sit for Jon Edgar in Fittleworth during 2009 as part of the sculptor's environmental series of heads.

=== Theatre and media ===
Rapley co-wrote a one-man play 2071 with playwright Duncan Macmillan, which he performed at London's Royal Court Theatre in November 2014, continuing to Hamburg and Brussels. The play was published by John Murray in June 2015. The book '2071 - The World We'll Leave Our Grandchildren' is available from John Murray. In 2019 Rapley was the Science Consultant on BBC1's ‘Climate Change – The Facts’ presented by Sir David Attenborough, and in 2020 on the BBC1 three-part series based around Greta Thunberg, 'Greta Thunberg: A Year to Change the World'.

=== Criticism of Museum Oil and Gas Sponsorship ===
In October 2021 Rapley resigned from the Science Museum Group's Scientific Advisory Board over the issue of gallery and exhibit sponsorship by oil and gas companies, citing; "The reality of the climate crisis, the need to abolish fossil fuels as quickly as possible, and analyses such as the recent Carbon Tracker Report which bring into question the commitment of the oil and gas companies to do so".

=== Recognition ===
In 2008 he was awarded the Edinburgh Science Medal for having made 'a significant contribution to the understanding and wellbeing of humanity'.

Cultural offices
Preceded by Jon Tucker	Director of the Science Museum; 2007 – 2010	Succeeded by Ian Blatchford
