= Headlong (theatre company) =

British theatre company

- Type: Theatre group
- Purpose: Theatre
- Location: England, UK
- Website: headlong.co.uk

Headlong Theatre Limited (commonly just Headlong) is a British touring theatre company, formed in 1974 and named until 2006 as the Oxford Stage Company.

Its artistic directors have included Rupert Goold (2005–2013) and Jeremy Herrin (2013–2020). Its current artistic director is Holly Race Roughan.

Plays produced by Headlong include The House Party, A View from the Bridge, untitled f*ck m*ss s**gon play, Best of Enemies, People, Places & Things and Enron, and major digital theatre innovations Signal Fires and Unprecedented.
