= Critics Choice Awards =

American annual film awards

- Current: 31st Critics' Choice Awards
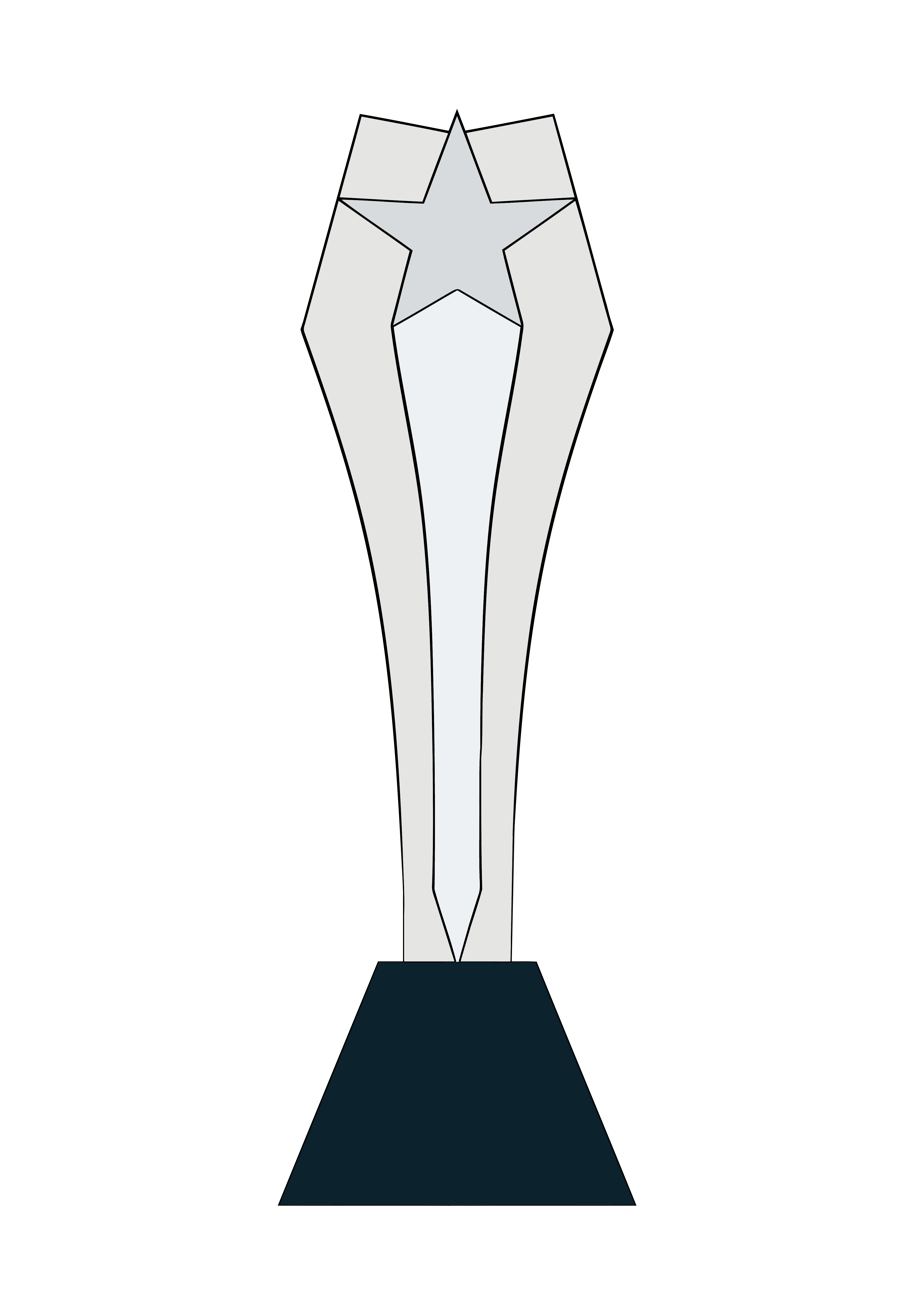
- Awarded for: The finest in cinematic achievements
- Country: United States
- Presented by: Critics Choice Association
- First award: 1996 (for 1995 films)
- Website: www.criticschoice.com

Most recent Critics Choice Award winners
- Best in films in 2025
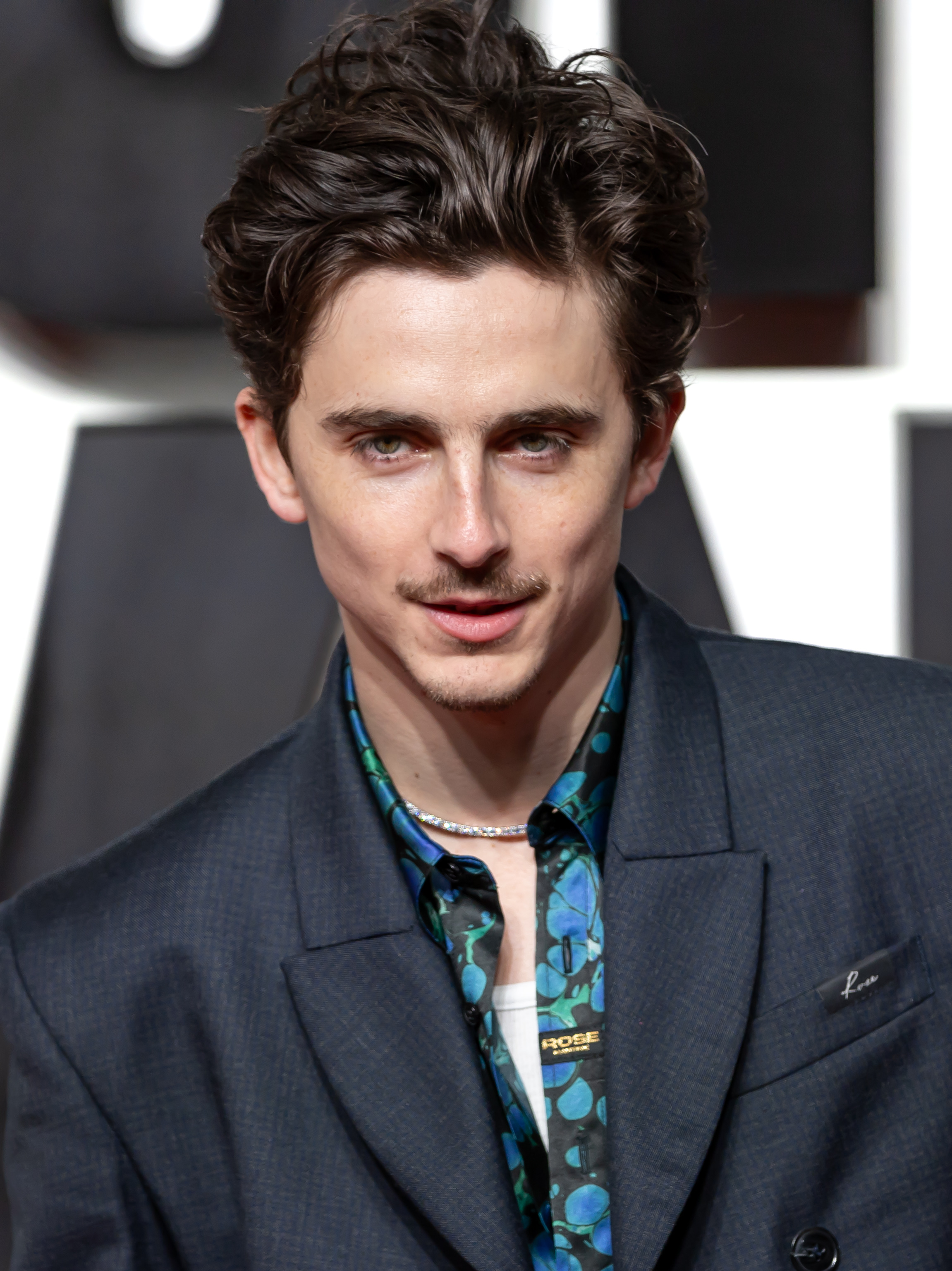

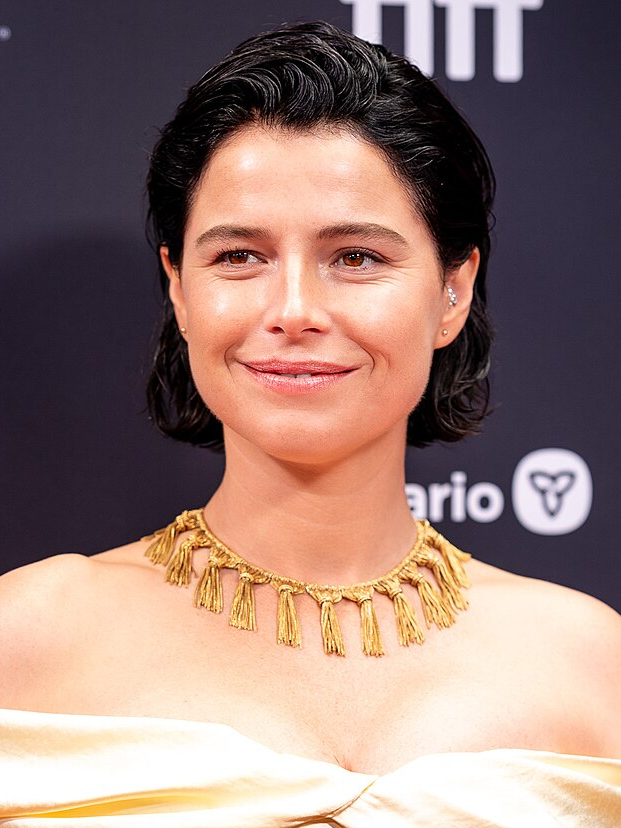

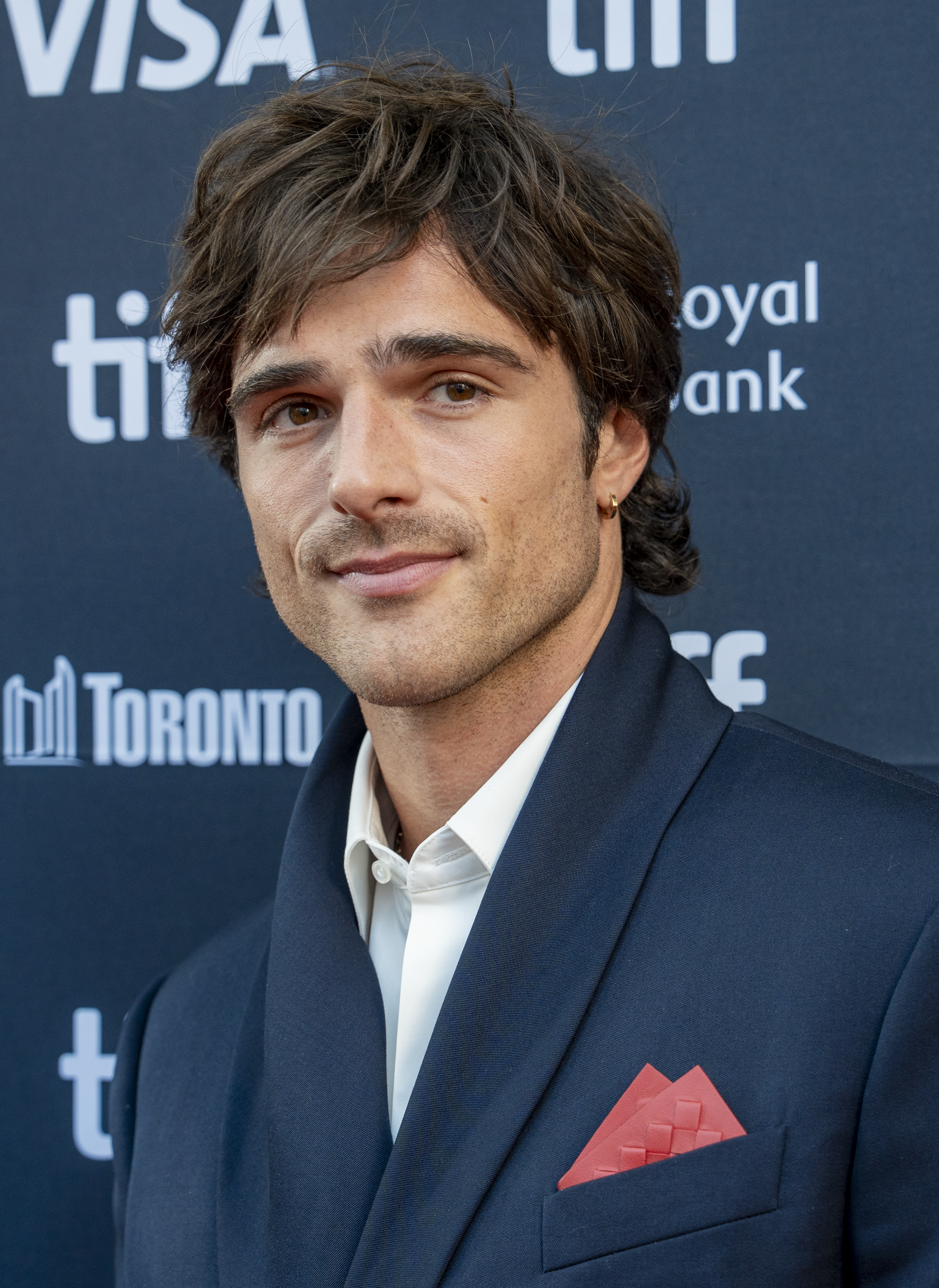

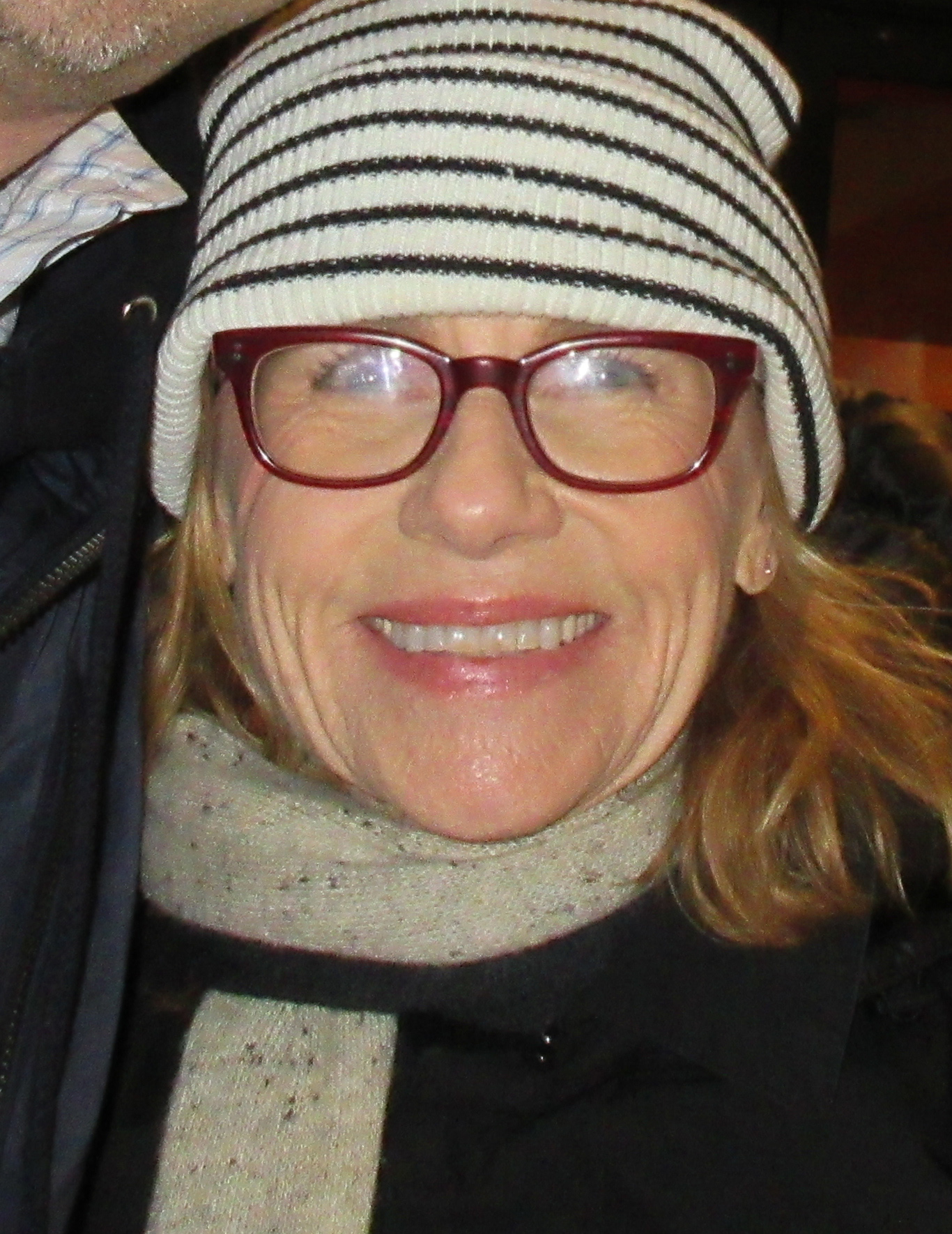

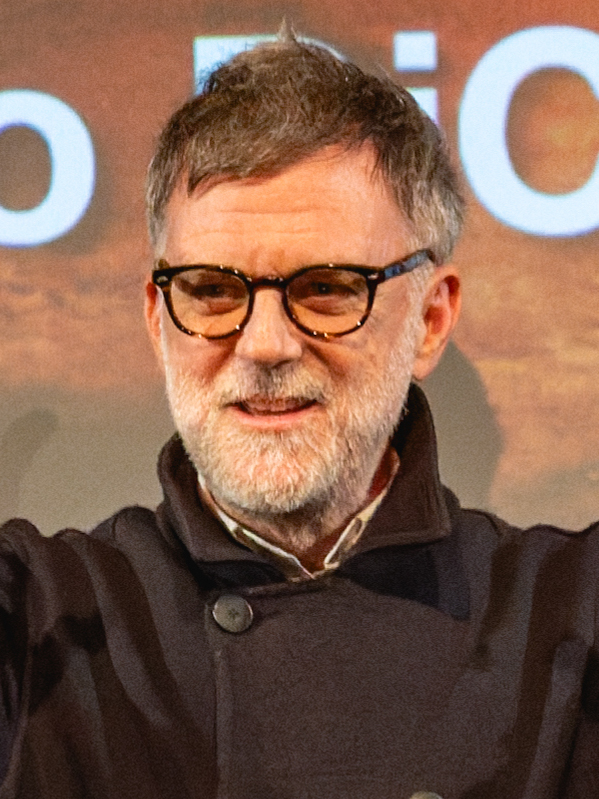

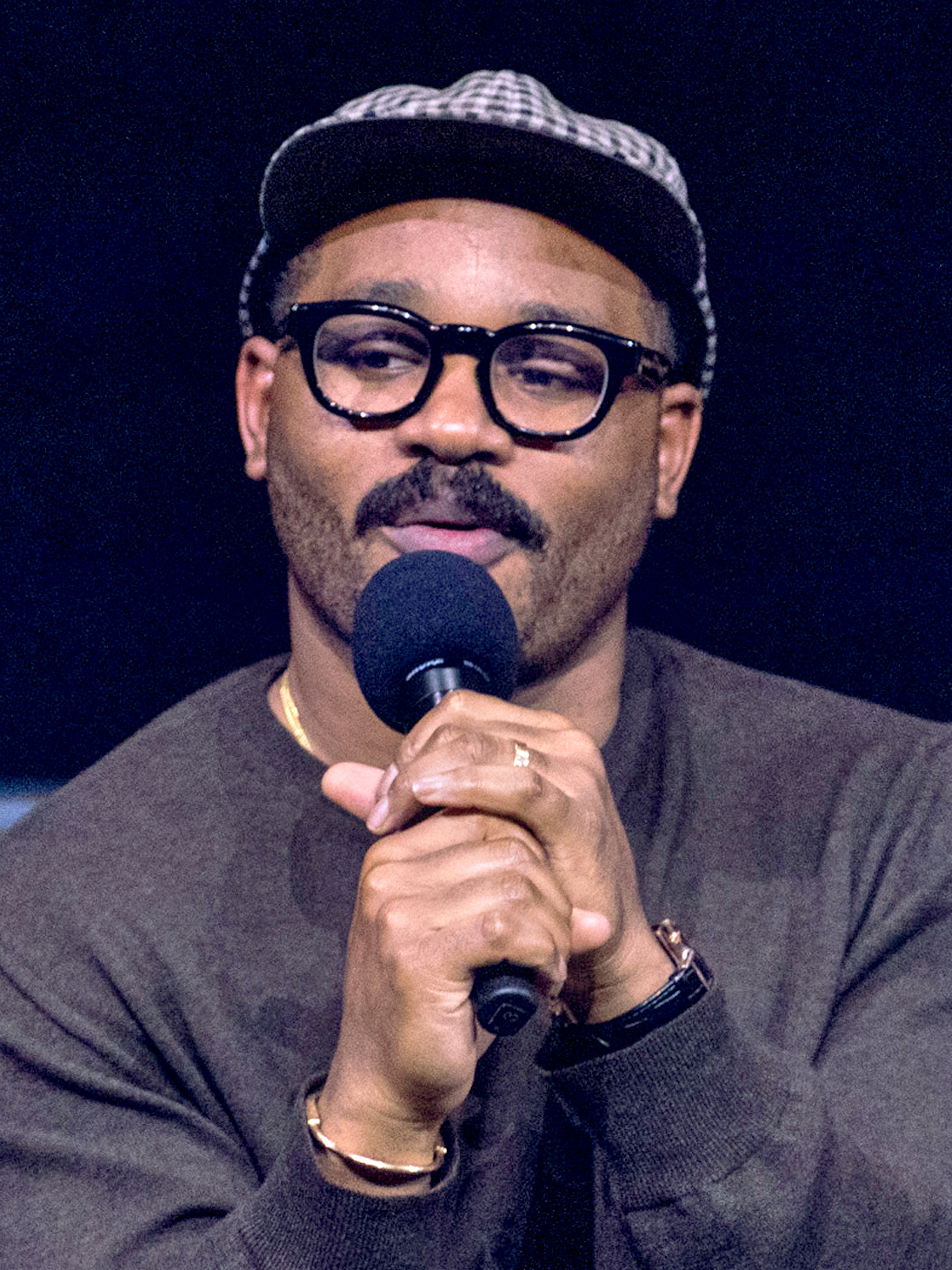
Award	Best Actor	Best Actress
Winner	Timothée Chalamet (Marty Supreme)	Jessie Buckley (Hamnet)
Award	Best Supporting Actor	Best Supporting Actress
Winner	Jacob Elordi (Frankenstein)	Amy Madigan (Weapons)
Award	Best Picture, Director, Adapted Screenplay	Best Original Screenplay
Winner	Paul Thomas Anderson (One Battle After Another)	Ryan Coogler (Sinners)
Previous Best Picture
Anora
Best Picture
One Battle After Another

The Critics Choice Awards (formerly known as the Broadcast Film Critics Association Award) is an awards show presented annually by the American Critics Choice Association (CCA) to honor the finest in cinematic achievement. Written ballots are submitted during a week-long nominating period, and the resulting nominees are announced in December. The winners chosen by subsequent voting are revealed at the annual Critics Choice Movie Awards ceremony in January. Additionally, special awards are given out at the discretion of the BFCA Board of Directors.

== History ==
The awards were originally named simply Critics Choice Awards. In 2010, the word Movie was added to their name, to differentiate them from the Critics Choice Television Awards, which were first bestowed the following year by the newly created Broadcast Television Critics Association. The name Critics Choice Awards now officially refers to the ceremony honoring performances in both film and television.

From 2006 through 2009, the awards ceremony was held in the Santa Monica Civic Auditorium. From 2010 through 2012, it took place in the refurbished, historic Hollywood Palladium. Broadcasting the ceremony began with the sixth ceremony on E! Entertainment Television in 2001 for four years, followed by The WB Network for two years, before returning to E! for a year. VH1 took over the broadcast in 2008. The live television broadcast of the event moved from VH1 to The CW in 2013, with the 19th ceremony airing on January 16, 2014, live from the Barker Hangar in Santa Monica, California. In October 2014, it was announced that the Critics Choice Movie Awards would move to A&E for 2015 and 2016.

It then returned to The CW for 2017, where it aired until 2024. Traditionally the ceremony has aired in the second week of January, deferring to the Golden Globe Awards, which has long claimed the first Sunday of January to open up the previous year's film awards season. It then claimed the first Sunday of January in 2022 after the Hollywood Foreign Press Association became enshrined in controversy over a lack of membership diversity and other building issues, and after the organization had not done enough, an industry boycott developed to the point where NBC said it would not carry the 2022 ceremony and would not televise it again until the HPFA made significant progress in fixing its issues. The CCA then claimed the first January, and by October 26, 2021, a simulcast agreement with TBS (which is a sister network to The CW through their joint venture between Paramount Global and Warner Bros. Discovery) was announced to broaden its viewership.

The show moved to cable channel E!, with a replay on Peacock, in 2025. In 2026, the show will air on both USA Network and E!.

== Categories ==
Current

- Best Picture (since 1995)
- Best Director (since 1995)
- Best Actor (since 1995)
- Best Actress (since 1995)
- Best Supporting Actor (since 1995)
- Best Supporting Actress (since 1995)
- Best Young Performer (since 1996)
- Best Adapted Screenplay (since 2009)
- Best Original Screenplay (since 2009)
- Best Comedy (since 2005)
- Best Animated Feature (since 1998)
- Best Foreign Language Film (since 1995)
- Best Cinematography (since 2009)
- Best Production Design (since 2009)
- Best Costume Design (since 2009)
- Best Makeup (since 2009)
- Best Editing (since 2009)
- Best Score (since 1999)
- Best Song (since 1998)
- Best Visual Effects (since 2009)
- Best Sound (2009–11; since 2025)
- Best Casting and Ensemble (since 2025)
- Best Stunt Design (since 2025)

Retired

- Best Acting Ensemble (2001–24)
- Best Action Movie (2009–19)
- Best Actor in an Action Movie (2012–16)
- Best Actress in an Action Movie (2012–16)
- Best Actor in a Comedy (2012–18)
- Best Actress in a Comedy (2012–18)
- Best Digital Acting Performance (2002)
- Best Documentary Feature (1995–2015)
- Best Family Film (1997–2007)
- Best Popular Film (2004)
- Best Sci-Fi/Horror Movie (2012–19)

== Films with multiple nominations and wins ==
The following films received at least ten nominations:

Nominations	Title
18	Barbie
16	Sinners
14	The Shape of Water
14	The Favourite
14	The Irishman
14	Everything Everywhere All at Once
14	One Battle After Another
13	Lincoln
13	12 Years a Slave
13	American Hustle
13	Birdman
13	Mad Max: Fury Road
13	Oppenheimer
13	Poor Things
12	Black Swan
12	La La Land
12	Black Panther
12	Once Upon a Time in Hollywood
12	Mank
12	Killers of the Flower Moon
11	The King's Speech
11	True Grit
11	The Artist
11	Hugo
11	Les Misérables
11	The Grand Budapest Hotel
11	Belfast
11	West Side Story
11	The Fabelmans
11	Conclave
11	Wicked
11	Frankenstein
11	Hamnet
10	Inglourious Basterds
10	Nine
10	Inception
10	Silver Linings Playbook
10	Gravity
10	Arrival
10	Moonlight
10	First Man
10	Minari
10	Dune
10	The Power of the Dog
10	Dune: Part Two
10	Emilia Pérez

The following films received at least 5 awards:

Awards	Title
9	Mad Max: Fury Road
8	La La Land
8	Oppenheimer
7	Gravity
7	Birdman
6	Gladiator
6	Avatar
6	Inception
6	Barbie
5	Sideways
5	Slumdog Millionaire
5	Everything Everywhere All at Once

== Ceremonies ==
#	Date	Venue	Host	Network
1st	January 22, 1996	—N/a	—N/a	—N/a
2nd	January 20, 1997	—N/a	—N/a	—N/a
3rd	January 20, 1998	—N/a	—N/a	—N/a
4th	January 25, 1999	—N/a	—N/a	—N/a
5th	January 24, 2000	—N/a	—N/a	—N/a
6th	January 22, 2001	—N/a	—N/a	—N/a
7th	January 11, 2002	—N/a	—N/a	—N/a
8th	January 17, 2003	—N/a	—N/a	—N/a
9th	January 10, 2004	—N/a	—N/a	—N/a
10th	January 10, 2005	Wiltern Theatre, Los Angeles	Eric McCormack	The WB
11th	January 9, 2006	Santa Monica Civic Auditorium, Santa Monica	Dennis Miller	The WB
12th	January 14, 2007	Santa Monica Civic Auditorium, Santa Monica	—N/a	E!
13th	January 7, 2008	Santa Monica Civic Auditorium, Santa Monica	D. L. Hughley	VH1
14th	January 8, 2009	Santa Monica Civic Auditorium, Santa Monica	—N/a	VH1
15th	January 15, 2010	Hollywood Palladium, Los Angeles	Kristin Chenoweth	VH1
16th	January 14, 2011	Hollywood Palladium, Los Angeles	—N/a	VH1
17th	January 12, 2012	Hollywood Palladium, Los Angeles	Rob Huebel and Paul Scheer	VH1
18th	January 10, 2013	Barker Hangar at the Santa Monica Airport, Santa Monica	Sam Rubin	The CW
19th	January 16, 2014	Barker Hangar at the Santa Monica Airport, Santa Monica	Aisha Tyler	The CW
20th	January 15, 2015	Hollywood Palladium, Los Angeles	Michael Strahan	A&E
21st	January 17, 2016	Barker Hangar at the Santa Monica Airport, Santa Monica	T.J. Miller	A&E, Lifetime and LMN
22nd	December 11, 2016	Barker Hangar at the Santa Monica Airport, Santa Monica	T.J. Miller	A&E
23rd	January 11, 2018	Barker Hangar at the Santa Monica Airport, Santa Monica	Olivia Munn	The CW
24th	January 13, 2019	Barker Hangar at the Santa Monica Airport, Santa Monica	Taye Diggs	The CW
25th	January 12, 2020	Barker Hangar at the Santa Monica Airport, Santa Monica	Taye Diggs	The CW
26th	March 7, 2021	Barker Hangar at the Santa Monica Airport, Santa Monica	Taye Diggs	The CW
27th	March 13, 2022	Fairmont Century Plaza, Los Angeles; Savoy Hotel, London	Nicole Byer and Taye Diggs	The CW and TBS
28th	January 15, 2023	Fairmont Century Plaza, Los Angeles	Chelsea Handler	The CW
29th	January 14, 2024	Barker Hangar at the Santa Monica Airport, Santa Monica	Chelsea Handler	The CW
30th	February 7, 2025	Barker Hangar at the Santa Monica Airport, Santa Monica	Chelsea Handler	E!
31st	January 4, 2026	Barker Hangar at the Santa Monica Airport, Santa Monica	Chelsea Handler	E! and USA Network
