= Critics' Choice Television Award for Best Variety Series =

Television award

- Awarded for: Best Variety Series
- Country: United States
- Presented by: Critics Choice Association
- First award: 2026
- Currently held by: Last Week Tonight with John Oliver (2026)
- Website: criticschoice.com

The Critics' Choice Television Award for Best Variety Series is one of the award categories presented annually by the Critics Choice Association. It was first introduced at the 31st Critics' Choice Awards in 2026.

== Winners and nominees ==
=== 2020s ===
| Year | Title | Network |
|---|---|---|
| 2026 | Last Week Tonight with John Oliver | HBO |
| 2026 | Conan O'Brien Must Go | HBO Max |
| 2026 | Saturday Night Live | NBC |

== See also ==
- Primetime Emmy Award for Outstanding Variety Series
- Primetime Emmy Award for Outstanding Scripted Variety Series
