= Critics' Choice Movie Award for Best Stunt Design =

Award given by the Critics Choice Association

- Awarded for: Best Stunt Design
- Country: United States
- Presented by: Critics Choice Association
- First award: 2026
- Currently held by: Wade Eastwood for Mission: Impossible – The Final Reckoning (2026)
- Website: criticschoice.com

The Critics' Choice Movie Award for Best Stunt Design is one of the Critics' Choice Movie Awards given to people working in the film industry by the Critics Choice Association. It was first introduced at the 31st Critics' Choice Awards in 2026.

== Winners and nominees ==
=== 2020s ===
Year	Film	Nominees	Ref.
2026	Mission: Impossible – The Final Reckoning	Wade Eastwood	
2026	Ballerina	Stephen Dunlevy, Kyle Gardiner, Jackson Spidell, Jeremy Marinas, Jan Petřina, Domonkos Párdányi, and Kinga Kósa-Gavalda	
2026	F1	Gary Powell, Luciano Bacheta, and Craig Dolby	
2026	One Battle After Another	Brian Machleit	
2026	Sinners	Andy Gill	
2026	Warfare	Giedrius Nagys	

== See also ==
- Actor Award for Outstanding Action Performance by a Stunt Ensemble in a Motion Picture
