= 31st Critics' Choice Awards =

2026 US film and television awards

- Official poster
- Date: January 4, 2026
- Site: Barker Hangar, Santa Monica, California, United States
- Hosted by: Chelsea Handler

Highlights
- Most wins: Film: Frankenstein / Sinners (4); Television: Adolescence (4)
- Most nominations: Film: Sinners (17); Television: Adolescence (6)
- Best Picture: One Battle After Another
- Best Comedy Series: The Studio
- Best Drama Series: The Pitt
- Best Limited Series: Adolescence
- Website: www.criticschoice.com

Television/radio coverage
- Network: E! / USA Network
- Viewership: 730,000

The 31st Critics' Choice Awards were presented on January 4, 2026, at the Barker Hangar at the Santa Monica Airport in Santa Monica, California, honoring the finest achievements of filmmaking and television programming in 2025. The ceremony was broadcast on E! and USA Network, and was hosted by comedian Chelsea Handler for the fourth consecutive year.

The nominations for both the film and television categories were announced on cable's E! and USA Network's channels. Additionally, the announcement of the nominations were streamed on criticschoice.com, as well as the CCA, E!, E! Online and the USA Network's YouTube channels; the nominations were also announced on the CCA's social media channels. The livestream was hosted by television personalities Keltie Knight and Erin Lim Rhodes.

Ryan Coogler's period supernatural horror film Sinners led the film nominations with seventeen, followed by Paul Thomas Anderson's action thriller One Battle After Another with fourteen. For the television categories, the Netflix limited series Adolescence led the nominations with six, followed by the romantic comedy series Nobody Wants This with five.

== Ceremony information ==
For the first time, shortlists for eleven "below-the-line" categories were unveiled in November 2025. Sinners received the most mentions with thirteen, being the only film to be named on all eleven of the lists and earning across-the-board recognition in every category. Additionally, four new categories were introduced: three for film (Best Casting and Ensemble, Best Sound, and Best Stunt Design) and one for television (Best Variety Series).

Preceding the ceremony, the red carpet special LIVE from E!: Critics Choice Awards aired live from 2:00–4:00 p.m. PT/5:00–7:00 p.m. ET on both E! and USA Network. The special was hosted by Keltie Knight and Justin Sylvester, along with Will Marfuggi and Erin Lim Rhodes. Throughout the ceremony, Real Time Recap (a live format that activated on the E! Entertainment Instagram during the commercial breaks) delivered exclusive and instant content as they unfolded.

== Winners and nominees ==
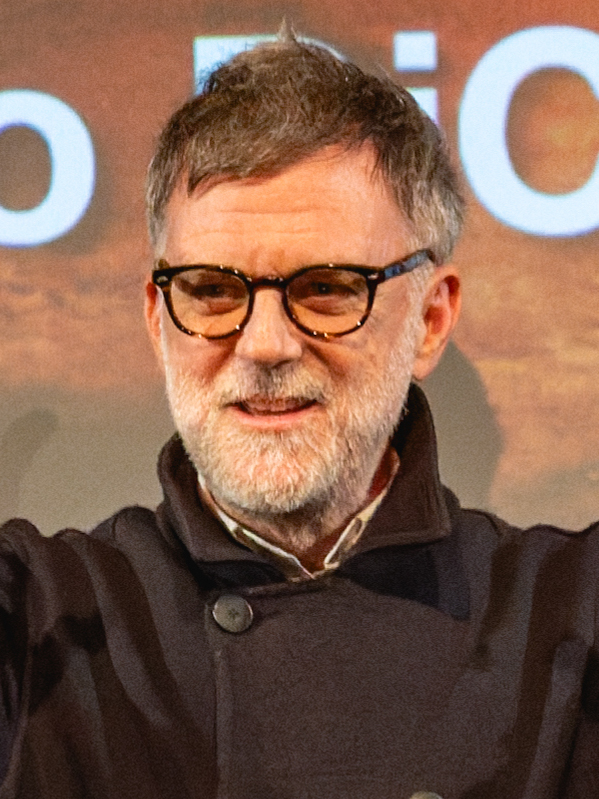
Paul Thomas Anderson, Best Director and Best Adapted Screenplay winner

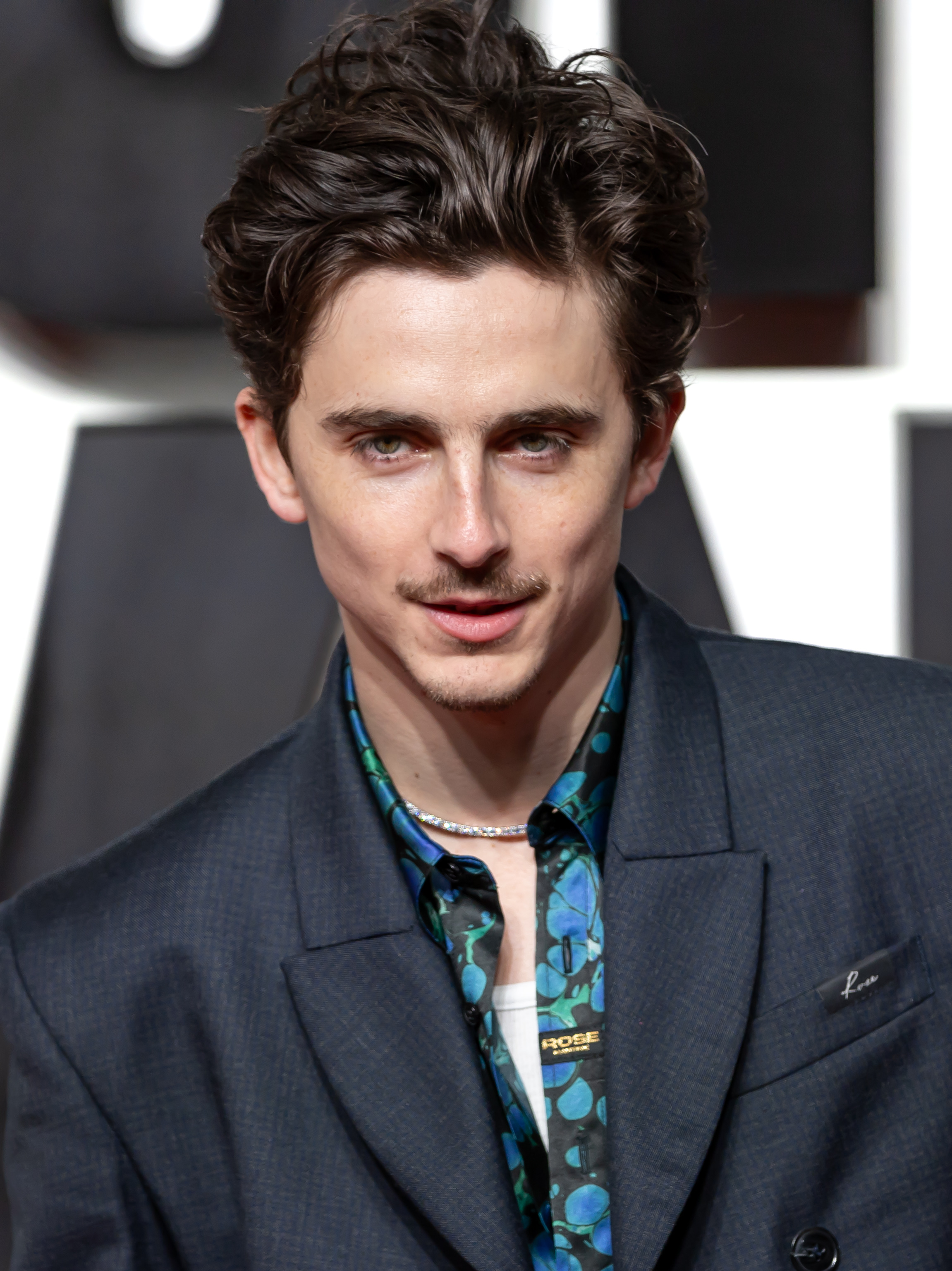
Timothée Chalamet, Best Actor winner

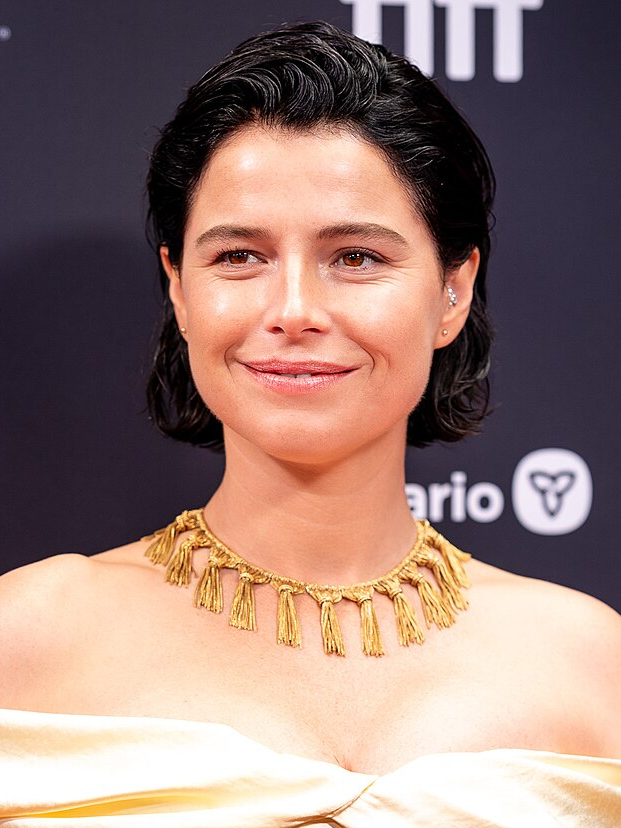
Jessie Buckley, Best Actress winner

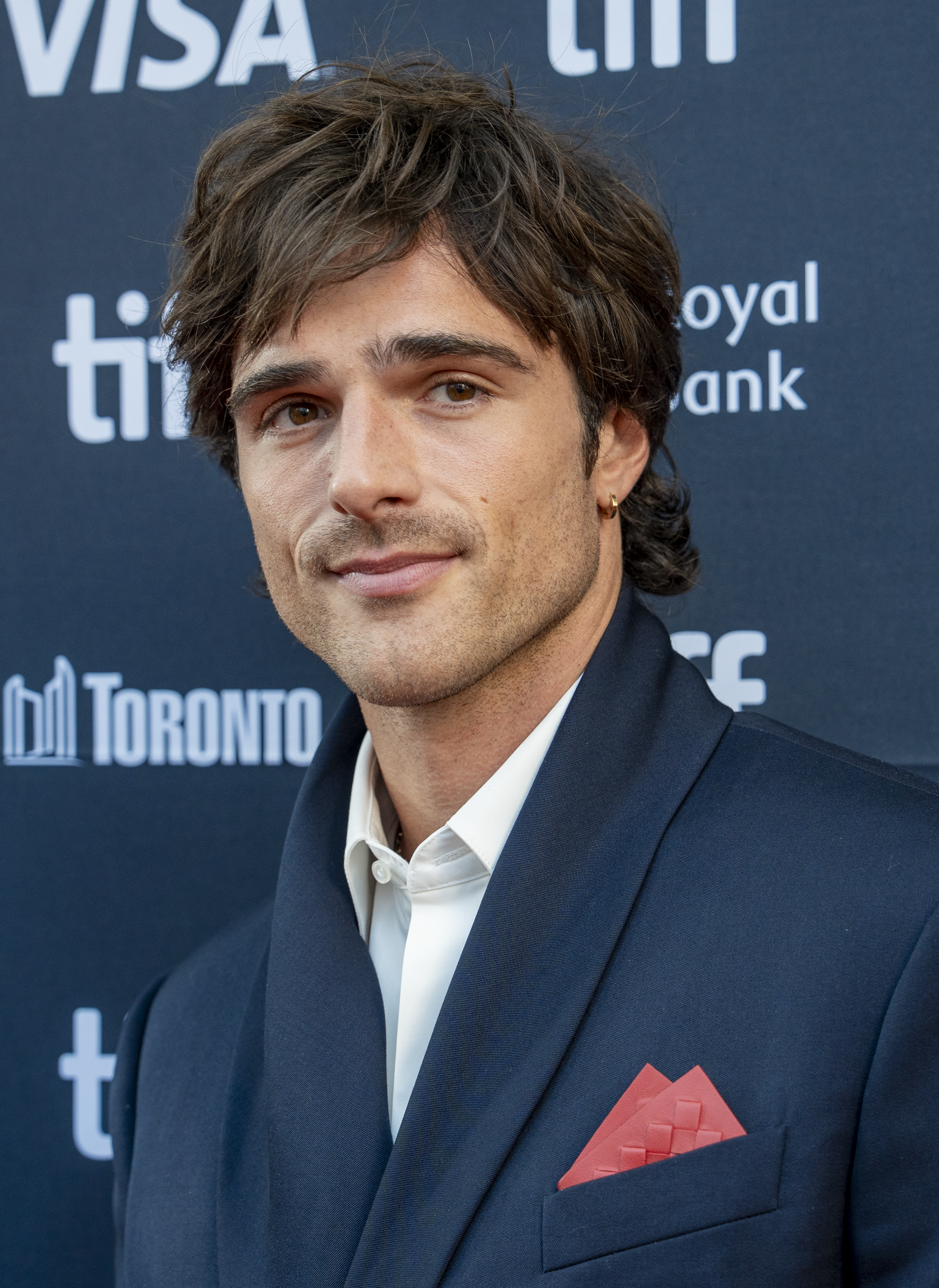
Jacob Elordi, Best Supporting Actor winner

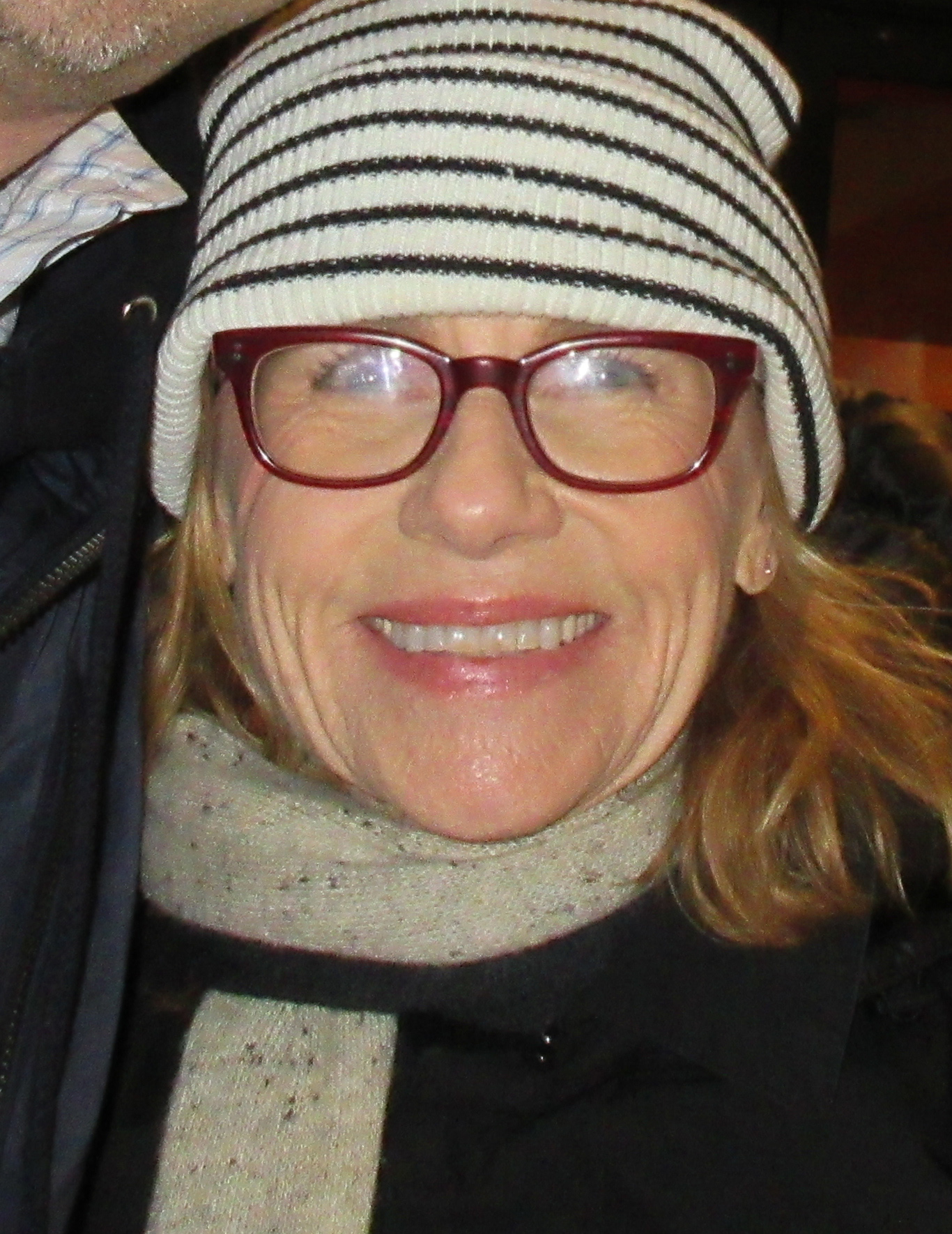
Amy Madigan, Best Supporting Actress winner

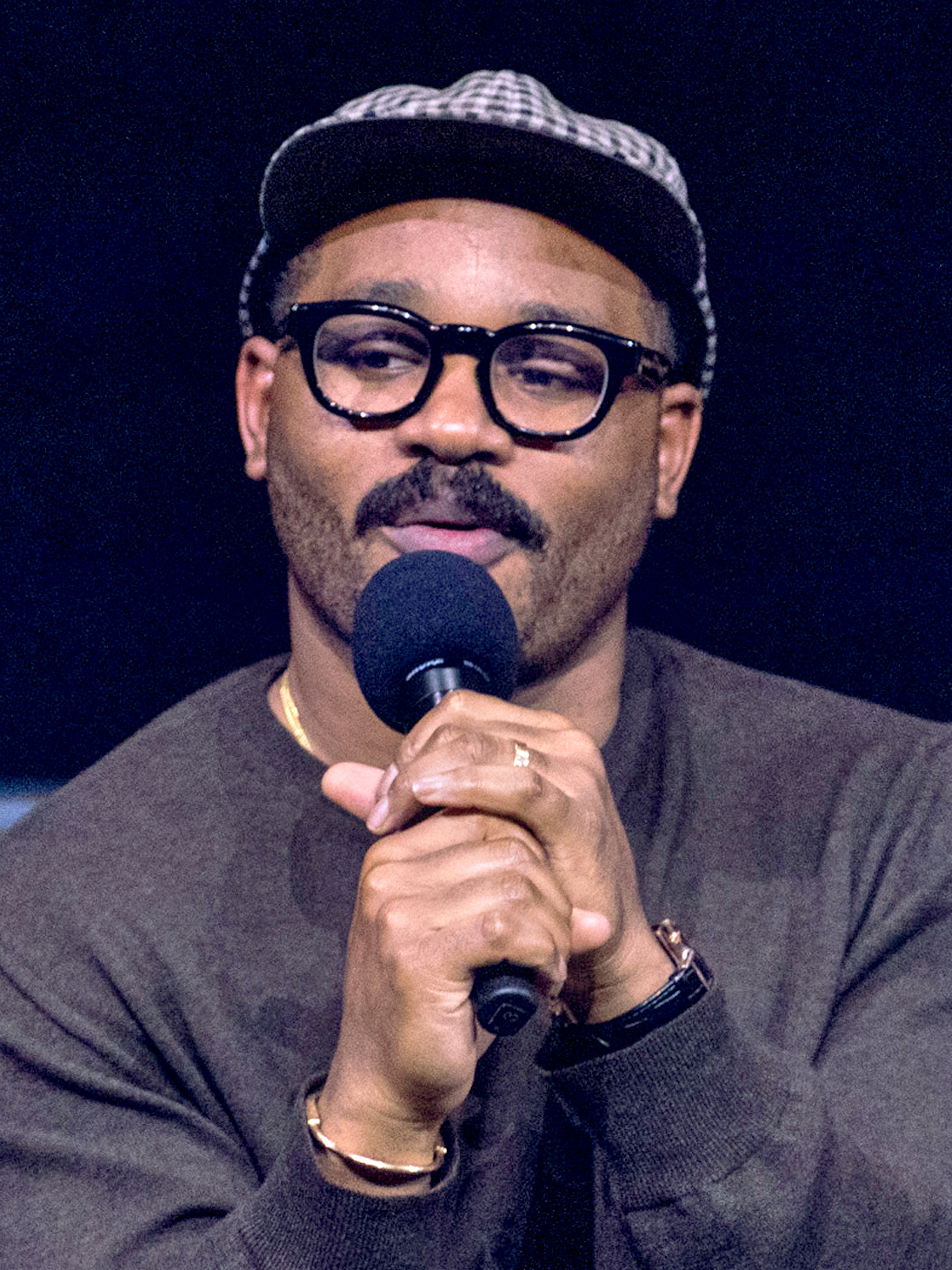
Ryan Coogler, Best Original Screenplay winner

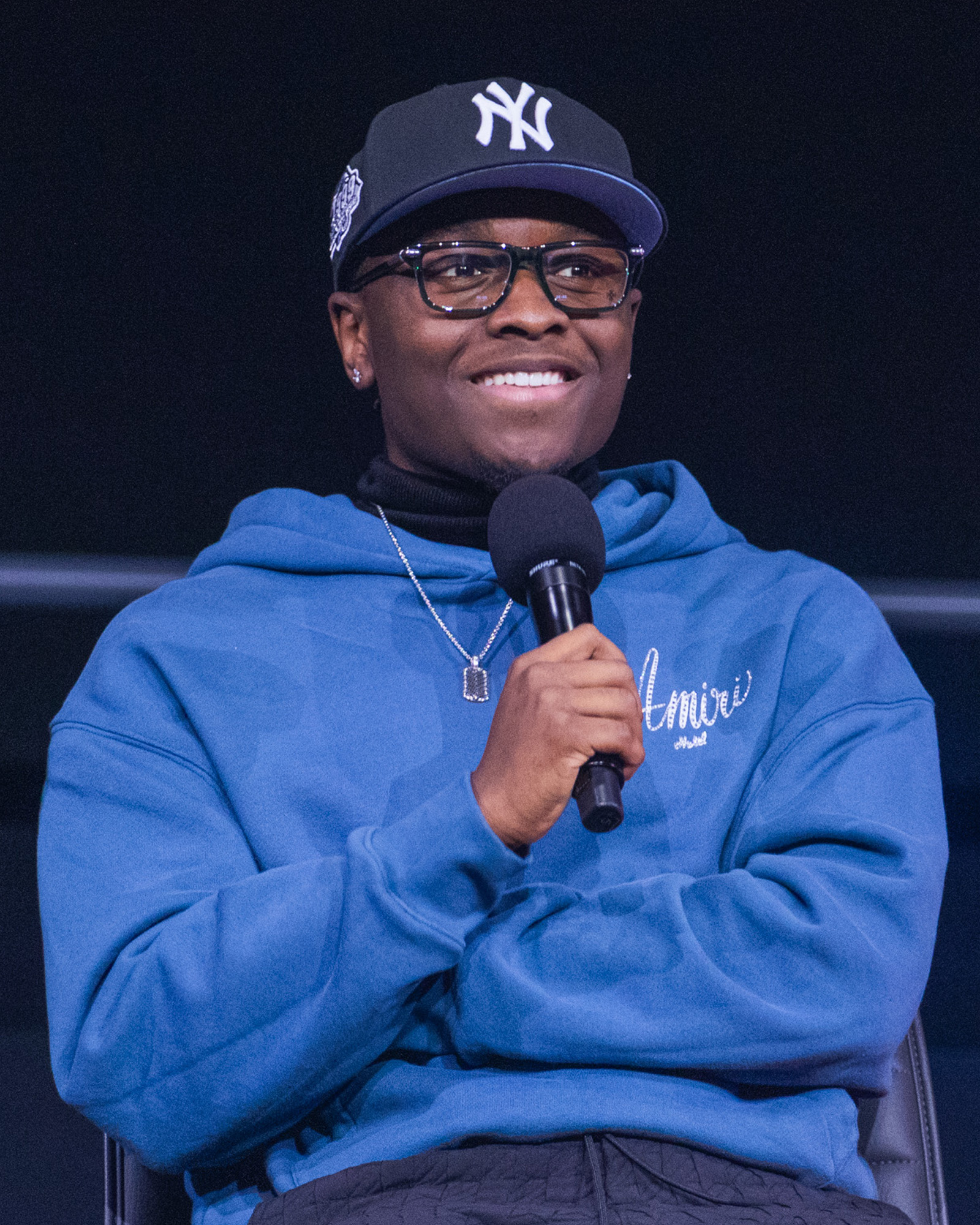
Miles Caton, Best Young Actor/Actress winner

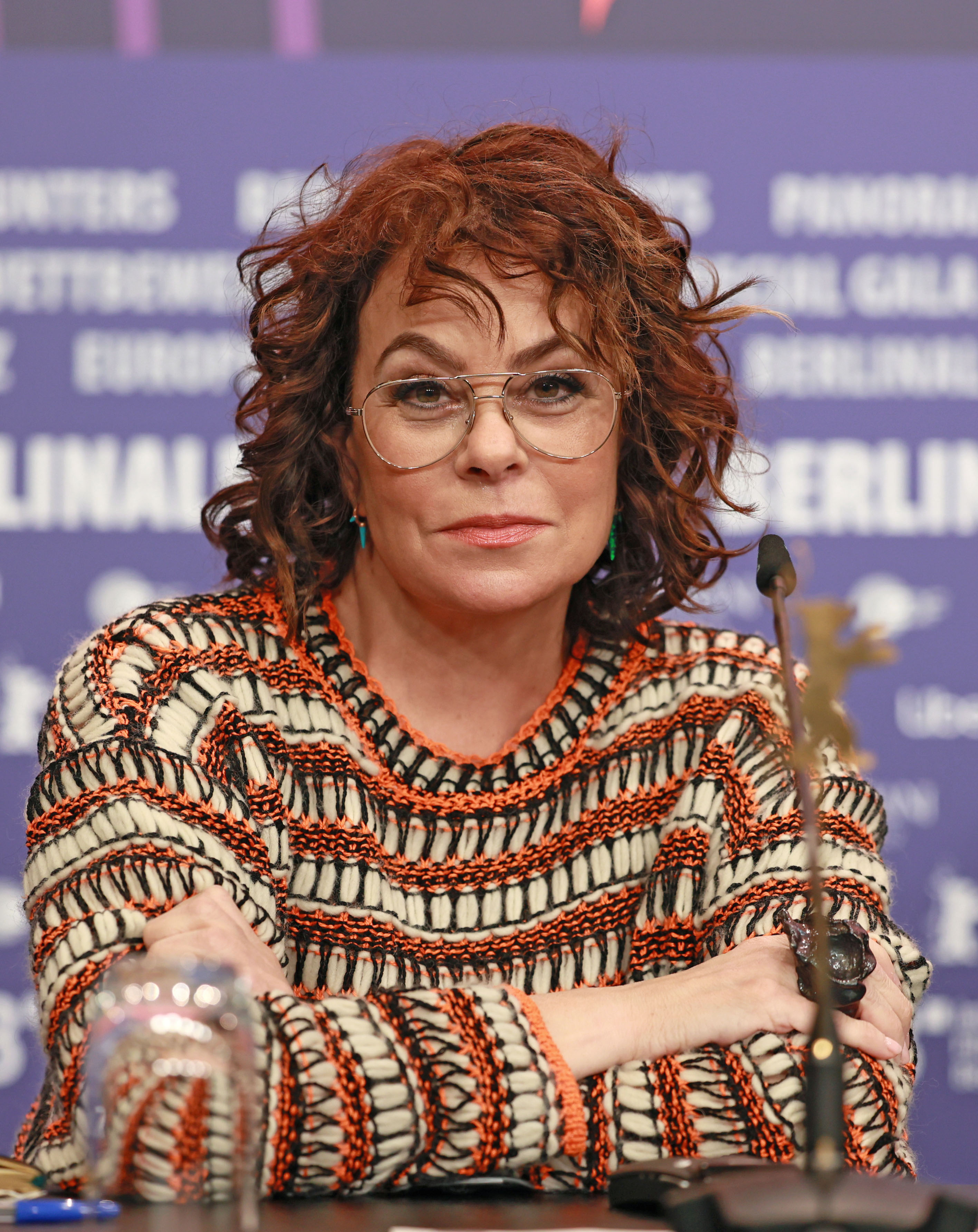
Francine Maisler, Best Casting and Ensemble winner

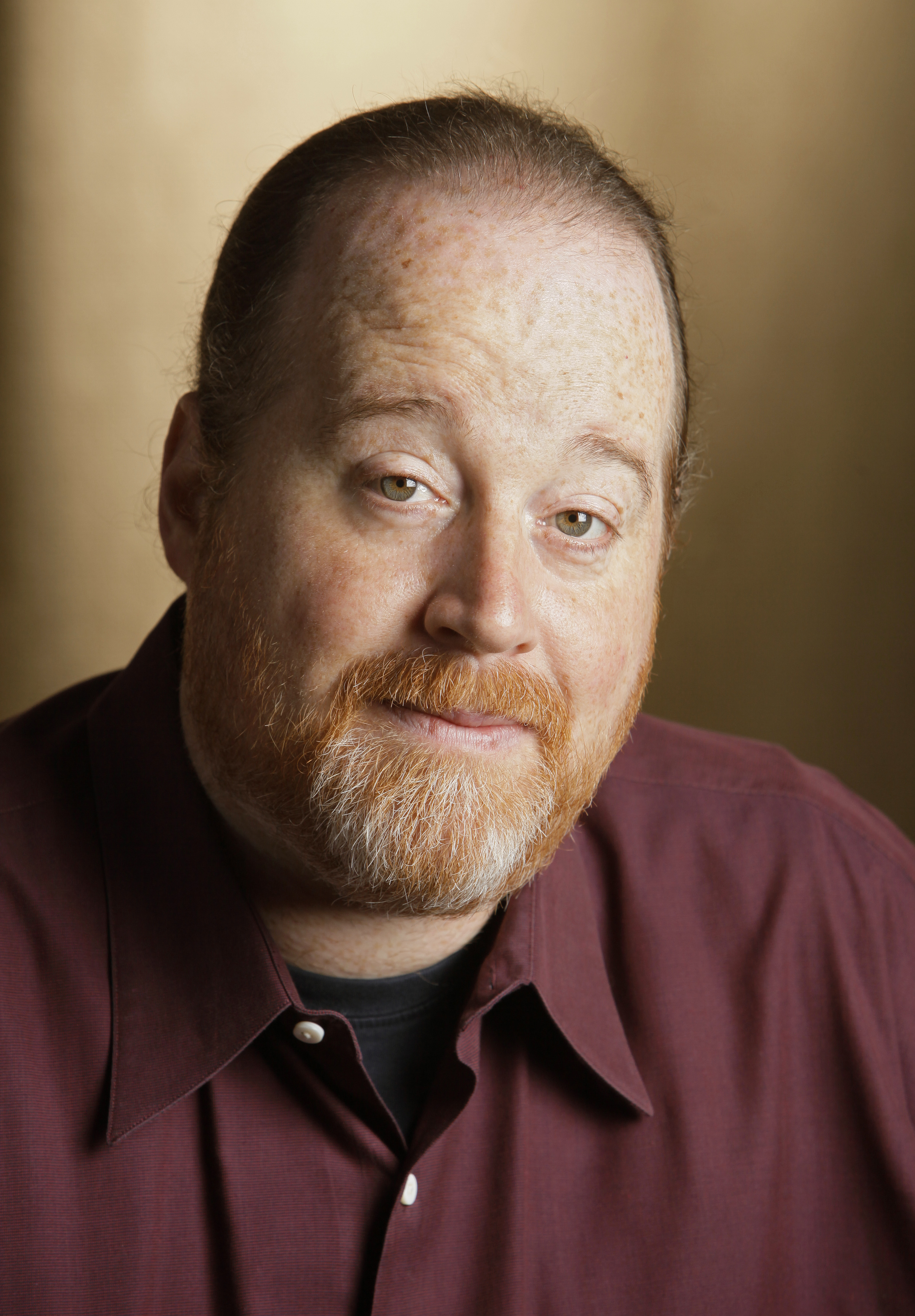
Stephen Mirrione, Best Editing winner

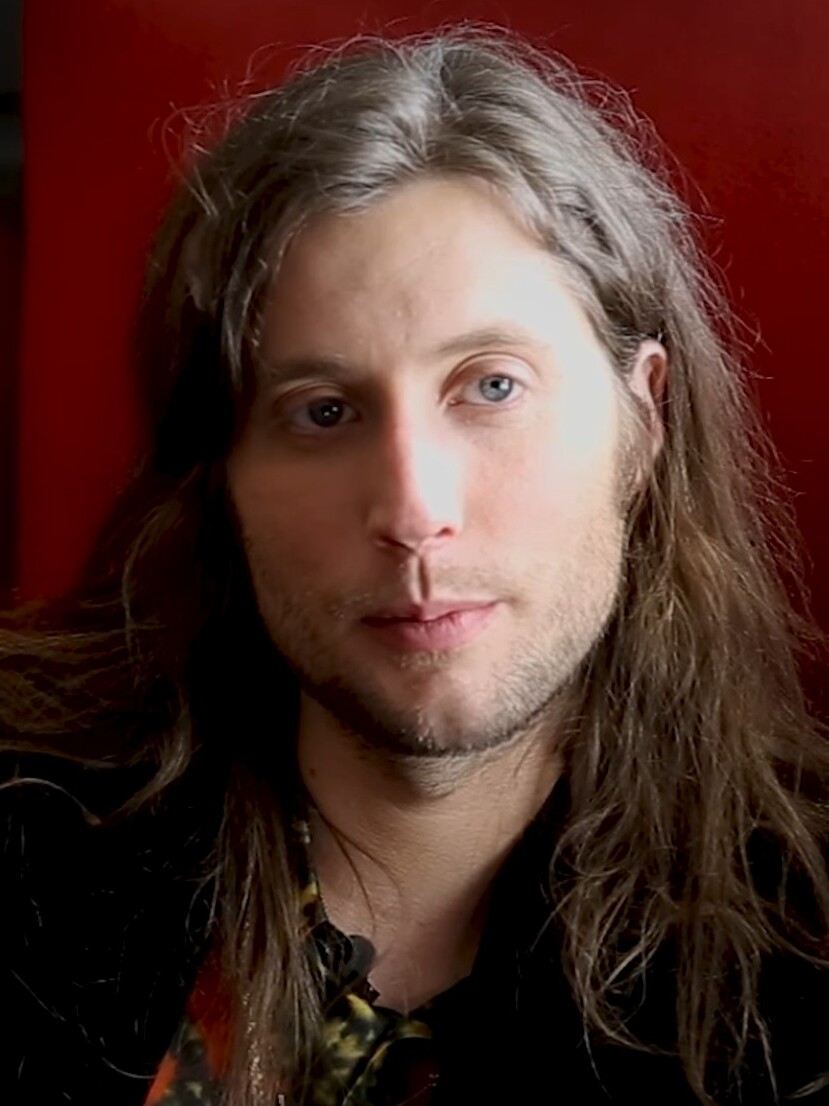
Ludwig Göransson, Best Score winner

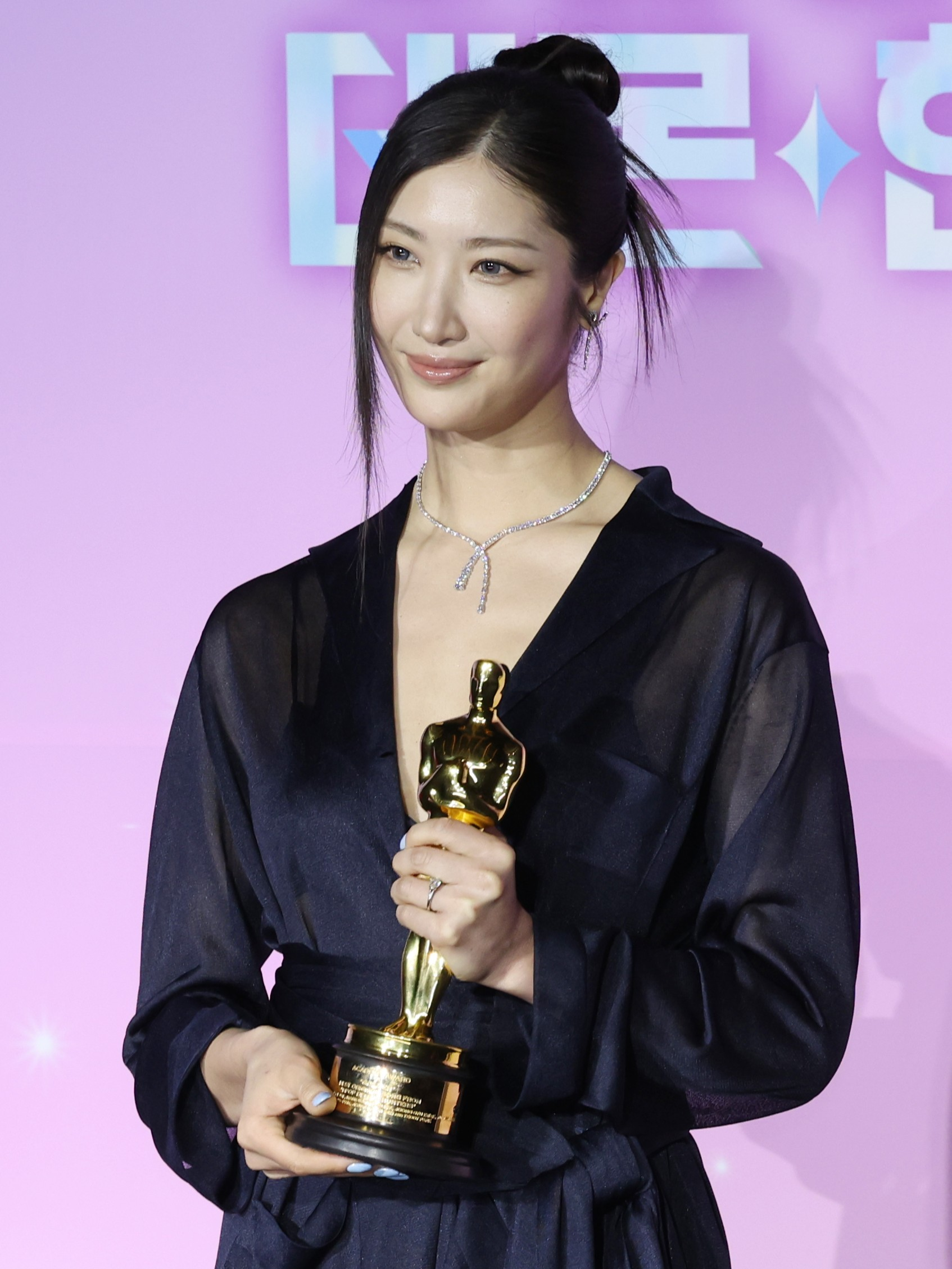
Ejae, Best Song co-winner

=== Film ===
Best Picture: One Battle After Another; Bugonia (Note: Nominated for Best Science Fiction/Fantasy Movie at the 6th Critics' Choice Super Awards); Frankenstein; Hamnet; Jay Kelly; Marty Supreme; Sentimental Value; Sinners (Note: Won Best Horror Movie at the 5th Critics' Choice Super Awards); Train Dreams; Wicked: For Good	Best Director: Paul Thomas Anderson – One Battle After Another; Ryan Coogler – Sinners; Guillermo del Toro – Frankenstein; Josh Safdie – Marty Supreme; Joachim Trier – Sentimental Value; Chloé Zhao – Hamnet
Best Actor: Timothée Chalamet – Marty Supreme as Marty Mauser; Leonardo DiCaprio – One Battle After Another as Bob Ferguson; Joel Edgerton – Train Dreams as Robert Grainier; Ethan Hawke – Blue Moon as Lorenz Hart; Michael B. Jordan – Sinners as Elijah "Smoke" Moore / Elias "Stack" Moore (Note: Won Best Actor in a Horror Movie at the 5th Critics' Choice Super Awards); Wagner Moura – The Secret Agent as Marcelo Alves / Armando Solimões / Fernando Solimões	Best Actress: Jessie Buckley – Hamnet as Agnes Shakespeare; Rose Byrne – If I Had Legs I'd Kick You as Linda; Chase Infiniti – One Battle After Another as Willa Ferguson; Renate Reinsve – Sentimental Value as Nora Borg; Amanda Seyfried – The Testament of Ann Lee as Ann Lee; Emma Stone – Bugonia as Michelle Fuller (Note: Nominated for Best Actress in a Science Fiction/Fantasy Movie at the 6th Critics' Choice Super Awards)
Best Supporting Actor: Jacob Elordi – Frankenstein as The Creature (Note: Nominated for Best Actor in a Science Fiction/Fantasy Movie at the 6th Critics' Choice Super Awards); Benicio del Toro – One Battle After Another as Sensei Sergio St. Carlos; Paul Mescal – Hamnet as William Shakespeare; Sean Penn – One Battle After Another as Col. Steven J. Lockjaw; Adam Sandler – Jay Kelly as Ron Sukenick; Stellan Skarsgård – Sentimental Value as Gustav Borg	Best Supporting Actress: Amy Madigan – Weapons as Gladys (Note: Nominated for Best Actress in a Horror Movie at the 6th Critics' Choice Super Awards) (Note: Won Best Villain in a Movie in a Movie at the 6th Critics' Choice Super Awards); Elle Fanning – Sentimental Value as Rachel Kemp; Ariana Grande – Wicked: For Good as Galinda "Glinda" Upland; Inga Ibsdotter Lilleaas – Sentimental Value as Agnes Borg Pettersen; Wunmi Mosaku – Sinners as Annie (Note: Nominated for Best Actress in a Horror Movie at the 5th Critics' Choice Super Awards); Teyana Taylor – One Battle After Another as Perfidia Beverly Hills
Best Young Actor/Actress: Miles Caton – Sinners as Samuel "Sammie" Moore; Everett Blunck – The Plague as Ben; Cary Christopher – Weapons as Alex Lilly; Shannon Mahina Gorman – Rental Family as Mia Kawasaki; Jacobi Jupe – Hamnet as Hamnet Shakespeare; Nina Ye – Left-Handed Girl as I-Jing	Best Casting and Ensemble: Sinners – Francine Maisler; Hamnet – Nina Gold; Jay Kelly – Douglas Aibel and Nina Gold; Marty Supreme – Jennifer Venditti; One Battle After Another – Cassandra Kulukundis; Wicked: For Good – Tiffany Little Canfield and Bernard Telsey
Best Original Screenplay: Ryan Coogler – Sinners; Noah Baumbach and Emily Mortimer – Jay Kelly; Ronald Bronstein and Josh Safdie – Marty Supreme; Zach Cregger – Weapons; Eva Victor – Sorry, Baby; Eskil Vogt and Joachim Trier – Sentimental Value	Best Adapted Screenplay: Paul Thomas Anderson – One Battle After Another; Clint Bentley and Greg Kwedar – Train Dreams; Park Chan-wook, Lee Kyoung-mi, Don McKellar, and Lee Ja-hye – No Other Choice; Guillermo del Toro – Frankenstein; Will Tracy – Bugonia; Chloé Zhao and Maggie O'Farrell – Hamnet
Best Cinematography: Train Dreams – Adolpho Veloso; F1 – Claudio Miranda; Frankenstein – Dan Laustsen; Hamnet – Łukasz Żal; One Battle After Another – Michael Bauman; Sinners – Autumn Durald Arkapaw	Best Editing: F1 – Stephen Mirrione; A House of Dynamite – Kirk Baxter; Marty Supreme – Ronald Bronstein and Josh Safdie; One Battle After Another – Andy Jurgensen; The Perfect Neighbor – Viridiana Lieberman; Sinners – Michael P. Shawver
Best Costume Design: Frankenstein – Kate Hawley; Hamnet – Malgosia Turzanska; Hedda – Lindsay Pugh; Kiss of the Spider Woman – Colleen Atwood and Christine Cantella; Sinners – Ruth E. Carter; Wicked: For Good – Paul Tazewell	Best Production Design: Frankenstein – Tamara Deverell and Shane Vieau; The Fantastic Four: First Steps – Jille Azis and Kasra Farahani; Hamnet – Fiona Crombie and Alice Felton; Marty Supreme – Jack Fisk and Adam Willis; Sinners – Hannah Beachler and Monique Champagne; Wicked: For Good – Nathan Crowley and Lee Sandales
Best Score: Sinners – Ludwig Göransson; F1 – Hans Zimmer; Frankenstein – Alexandre Desplat; Hamnet – Max Richter; Marty Supreme – Daniel Lopatin; One Battle After Another – Jonny Greenwood	Best Song: "Golden" (Ejae, Mark Sonnenblick, Ido, 24, and Teddy) – KPop Demon Hunters; "Clothed by the Sun" (Daniel Blumberg) – The Testament of Ann Lee; "Drive" (Ed Sheeran, John Mayer, and Blake Slatkin) – F1; "I Lied to You" (Raphael Saadiq and Ludwig Göransson) – Sinners; "The Girl in the Bubble" (Stephen Schwartz) – Wicked: For Good; "Train Dreams" (Nick Cave and Bryce Dessner) – Train Dreams
Best Hair and Makeup: Frankenstein – Mike Hill, Jordan Samuel, and Cliona Furey; 28 Years Later – Flora Moody and John Nolan; Sinners – Siân Richards, Ken Diaz, Mike Fontaine, and Shunika Terry; The Smashing Machine – Kazu Hiro, Felix Fox, and Mia Neal; Weapons – Leo Satkovich, Melizah Wheat, and Jason Collins; Wicked: For Good – Frances Hannon, Mark Coulier, and Laura Blount	Best Sound: F1 – Al Nelson, Gwendolyn Yates Whittle, Gary A. Rizzo, Juan Peralta, and Gareth John; Frankenstein – Nathan Robitaille, Nelson Ferreira, Christian Cooke, Brad Zoern, and Greg Chapman; One Battle After Another – José Antonio García, Christopher Scarabosio, and Tony Villaflor; Sinners – Chris Welcker, Benny Burtt, Brandon Proctor, Steve Boeddeker, Felipe Pacheco, and David V. Butler; Sirāt – Laia Casanovas; Warfare – Mitch Low, Glenn Freemantle, Ben Barker, Howard Bargroff, and Richard Spooner
Best Visual Effects: Avatar: Fire and Ash – Joe Letteri, Richard Baneham, Eric Saindon, and Daniel Barrett; F1 – Ryan Tudhope, Nikeah Forde, Robert Harrington, Nicolas Chevallier, Eric Leven, Edward Price, and Keith Dawson; Frankenstein – Dennis Berardi, Ayo Burgess, Ivan Busquets, and José Granell; Mission: Impossible – The Final Reckoning – Alex Wuttke, Ian Lowe, Jeff Sutherland, and Kirstin Hall; Sinners – Michael Ralla, Espen Nordahl, Guido Wolter, and Donnie Dean; Superman – Stéphane Ceretti, Enrico Damm, Stéphane Nazé, and Guy Williams	Best Stunt Design: Mission: Impossible – The Final Reckoning – Wade Eastwood; Ballerina – Stephen Dunlevy, Kyle Gardiner, Jackson Spidell, Jeremy Marinas, Jan Petřina, Domonkos Párdányi, and Kinga Kósa-Gavalda; F1 – Gary Powell, Luciano Bacheta, and Craig Dolby; One Battle After Another – Brian Machleit; Sinners – Andy Gill; Warfare – Giedrius Nagys
Best Animated Feature: KPop Demon Hunters; Arco; Elio; In Your Dreams; Little Amélie or the Character of Rain; Zootopia 2	Best Comedy: The Naked Gun (Note: Nominated for Best Action Movie at the 6th Critics' Choice Super Awards); The Ballad of Wallis Island; Eternity; Friendship; The Phoenician Scheme; Splitsville
Best Foreign Language Film: The Secret Agent • Brazil; Belén • Argentina; It Was Just an Accident • Iran; Left-Handed Girl • Taiwan; No Other Choice • South Korea; Sirāt • Spain

=== Television ===
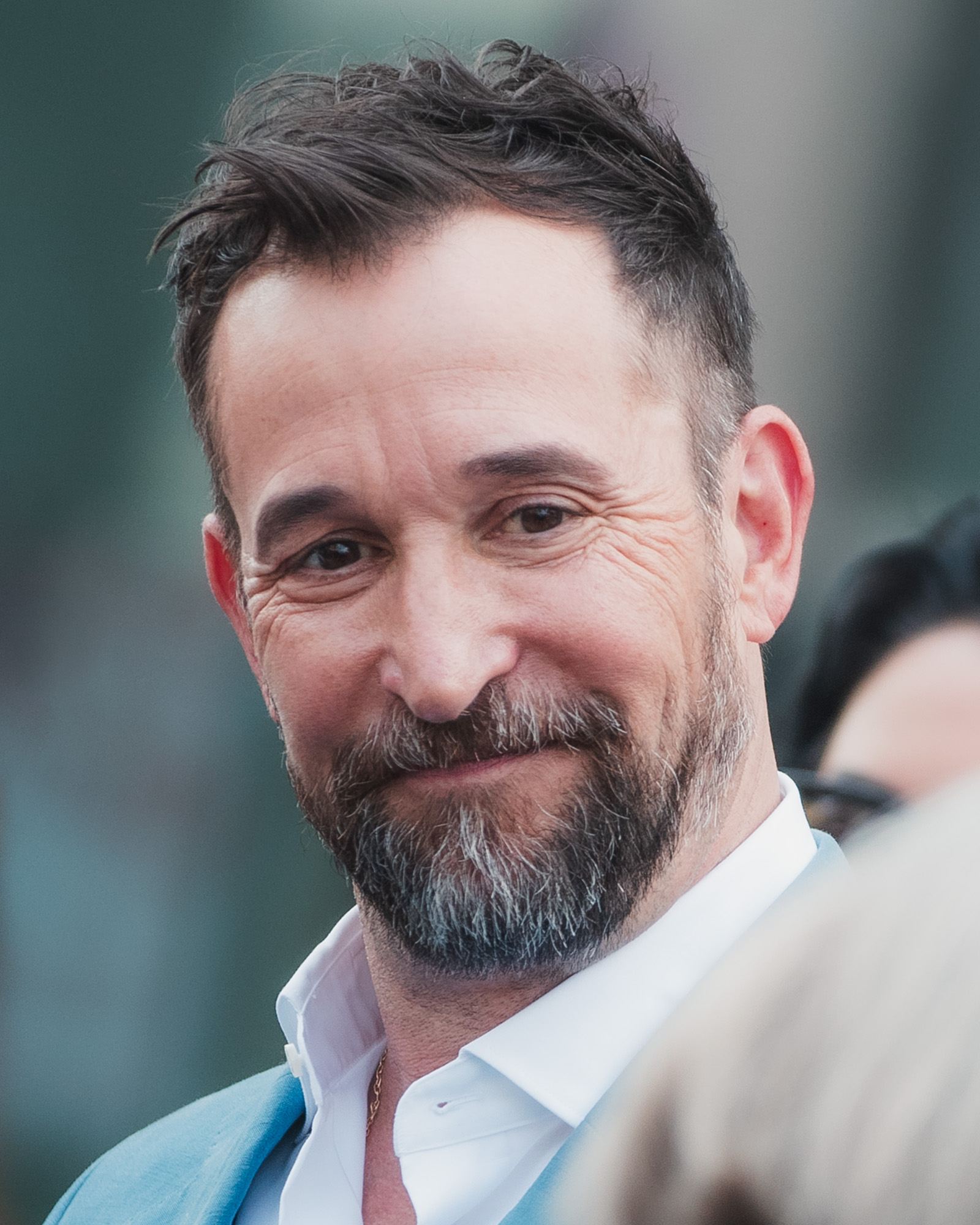
Noah Wyle, Best Actor in a Drama Series winner

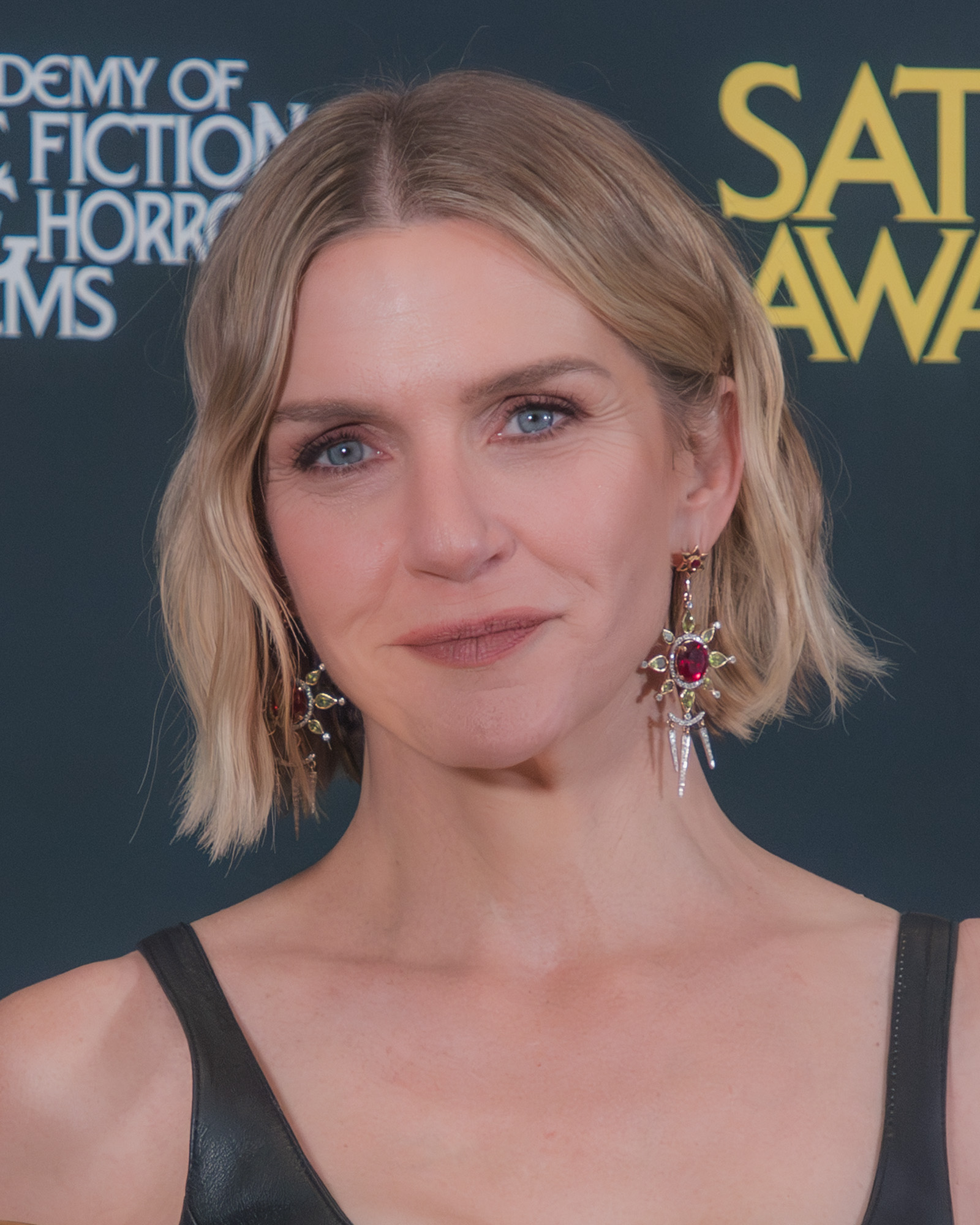
Rhea Seehorn, Best Actress in a Drama Series winner

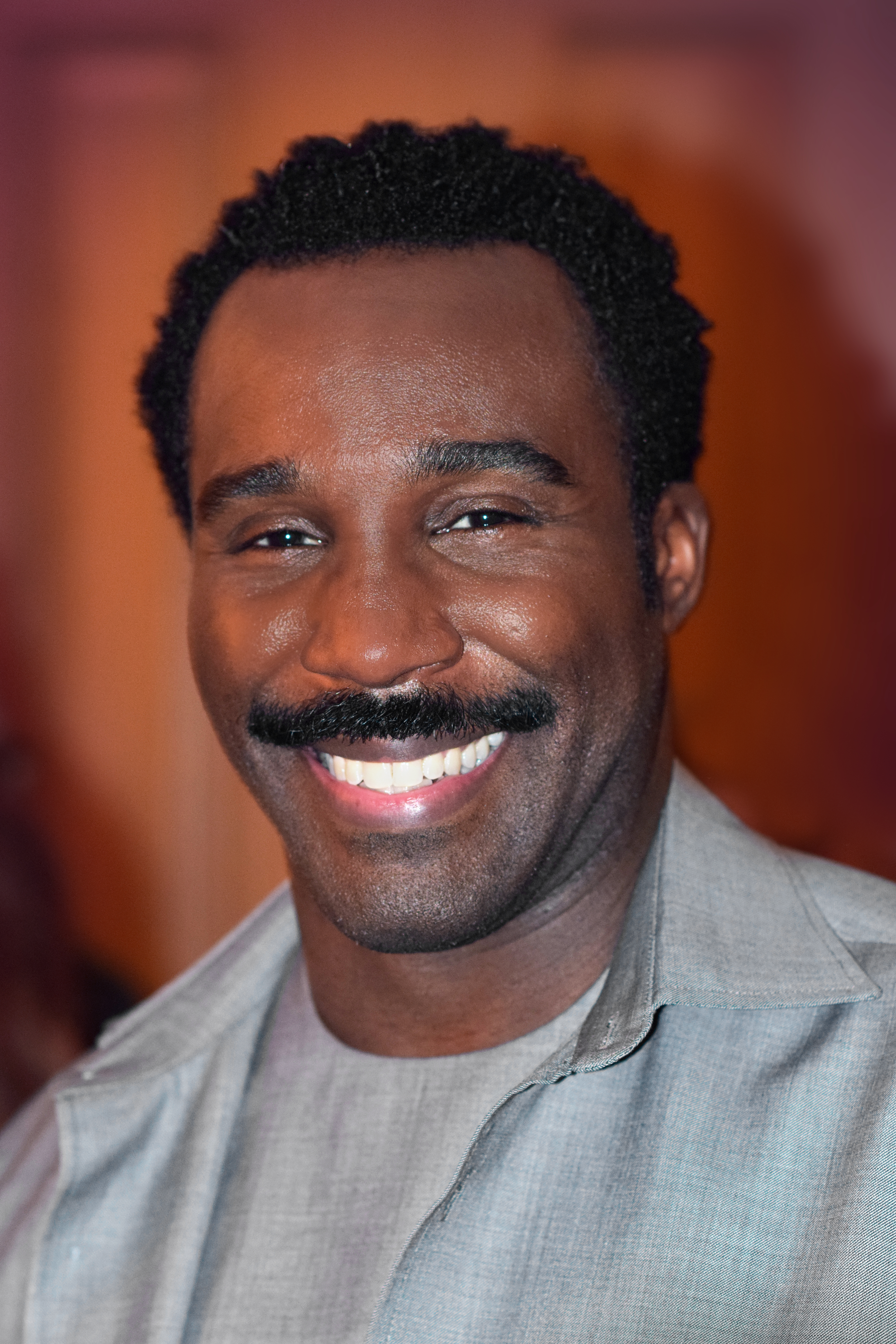
Tramell Tillman, Best Supporting Actor in a Drama Series winner

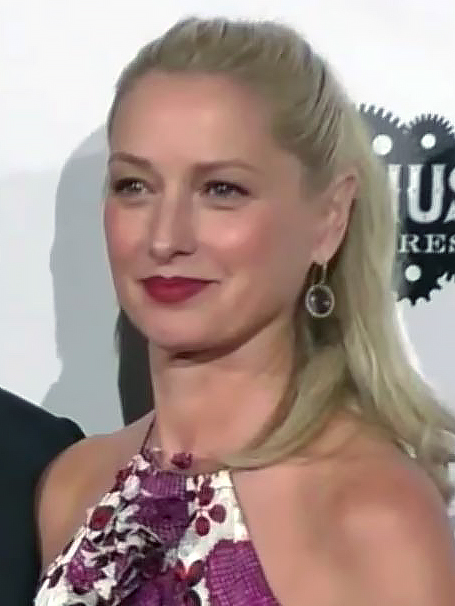
Katherine LaNasa, Best Supporting Actress in a Drama Series winner

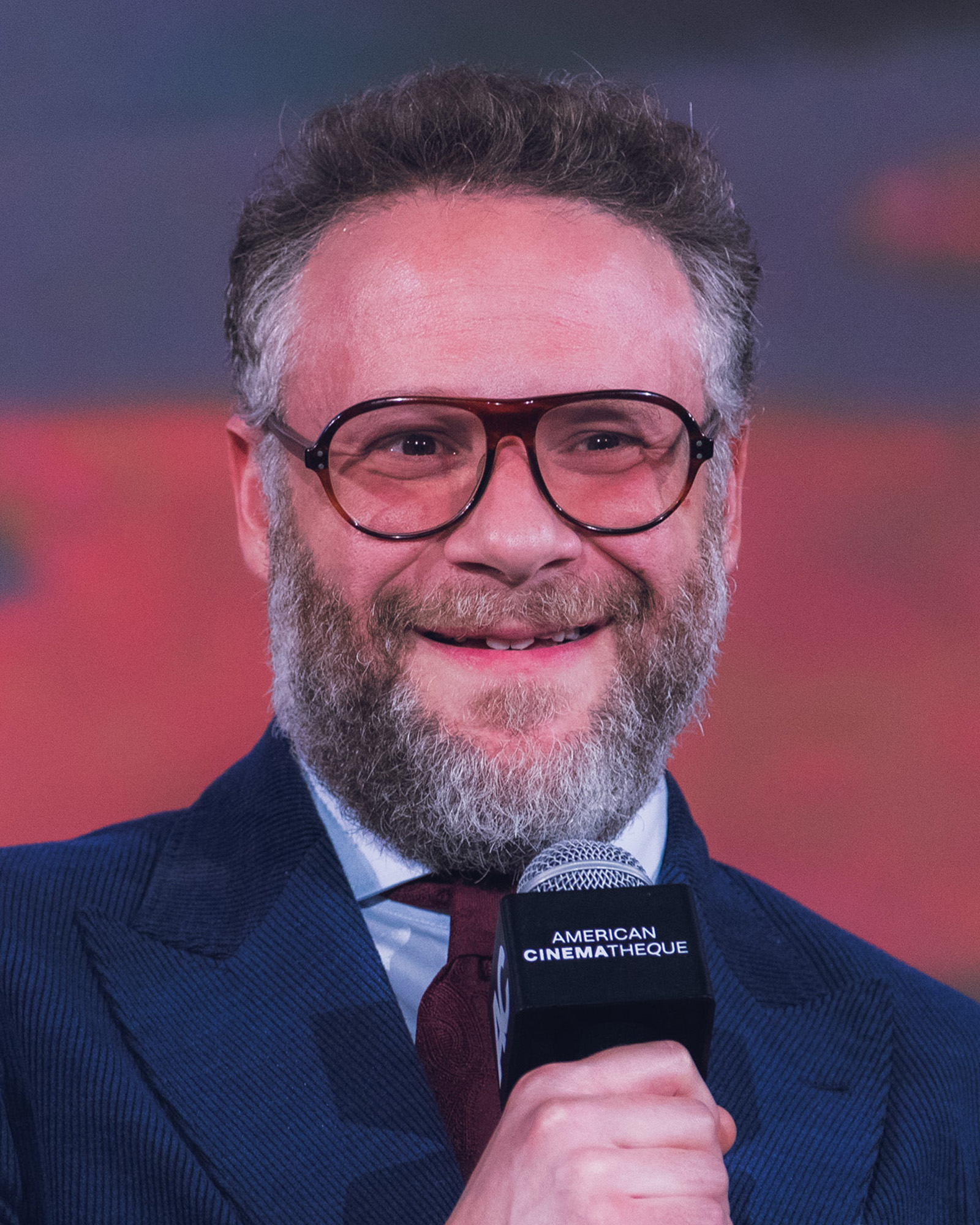
Seth Rogen, Best Actor in a Comedy Series winner

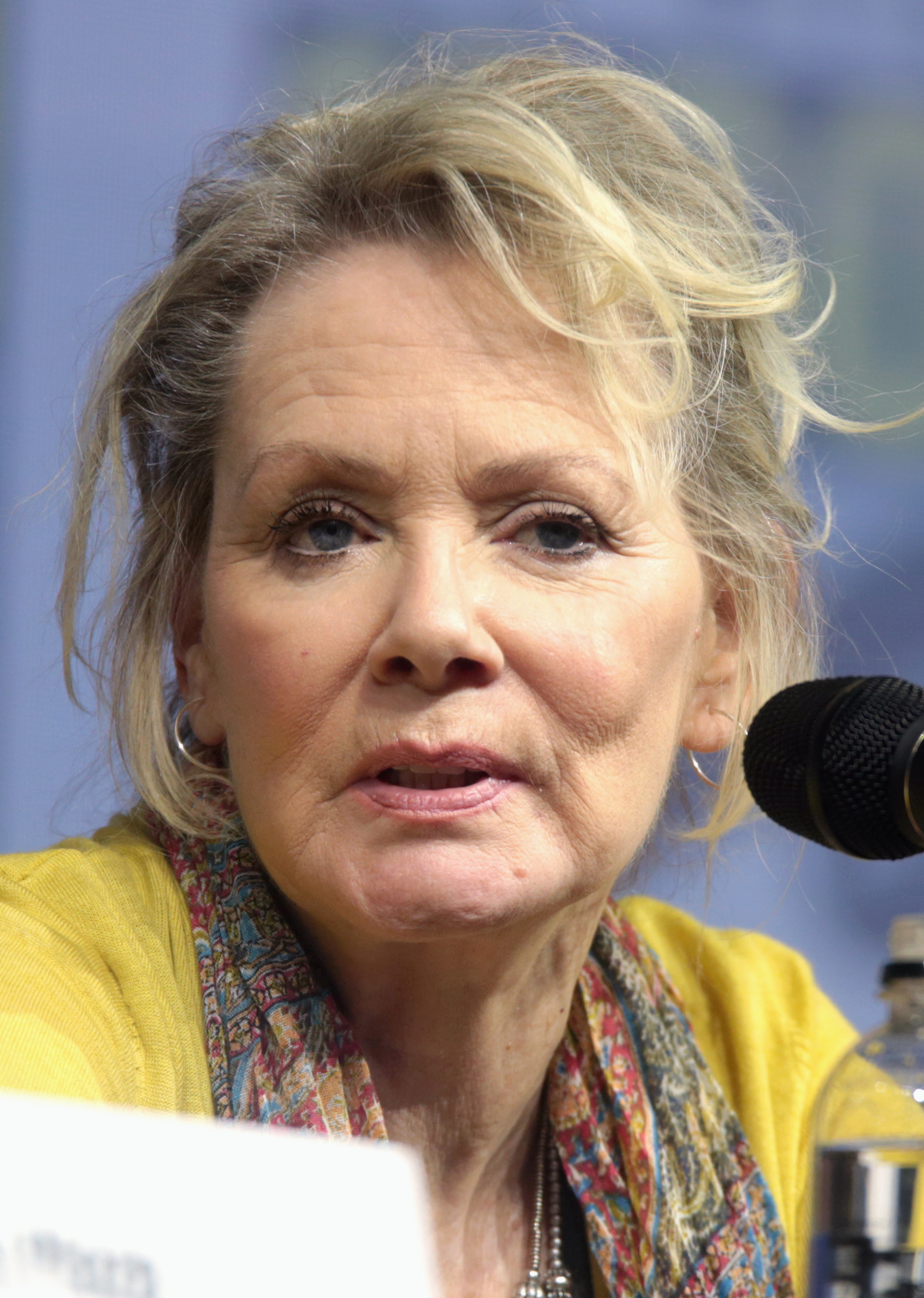
Jean Smart, Best Actress in a Comedy Series winner

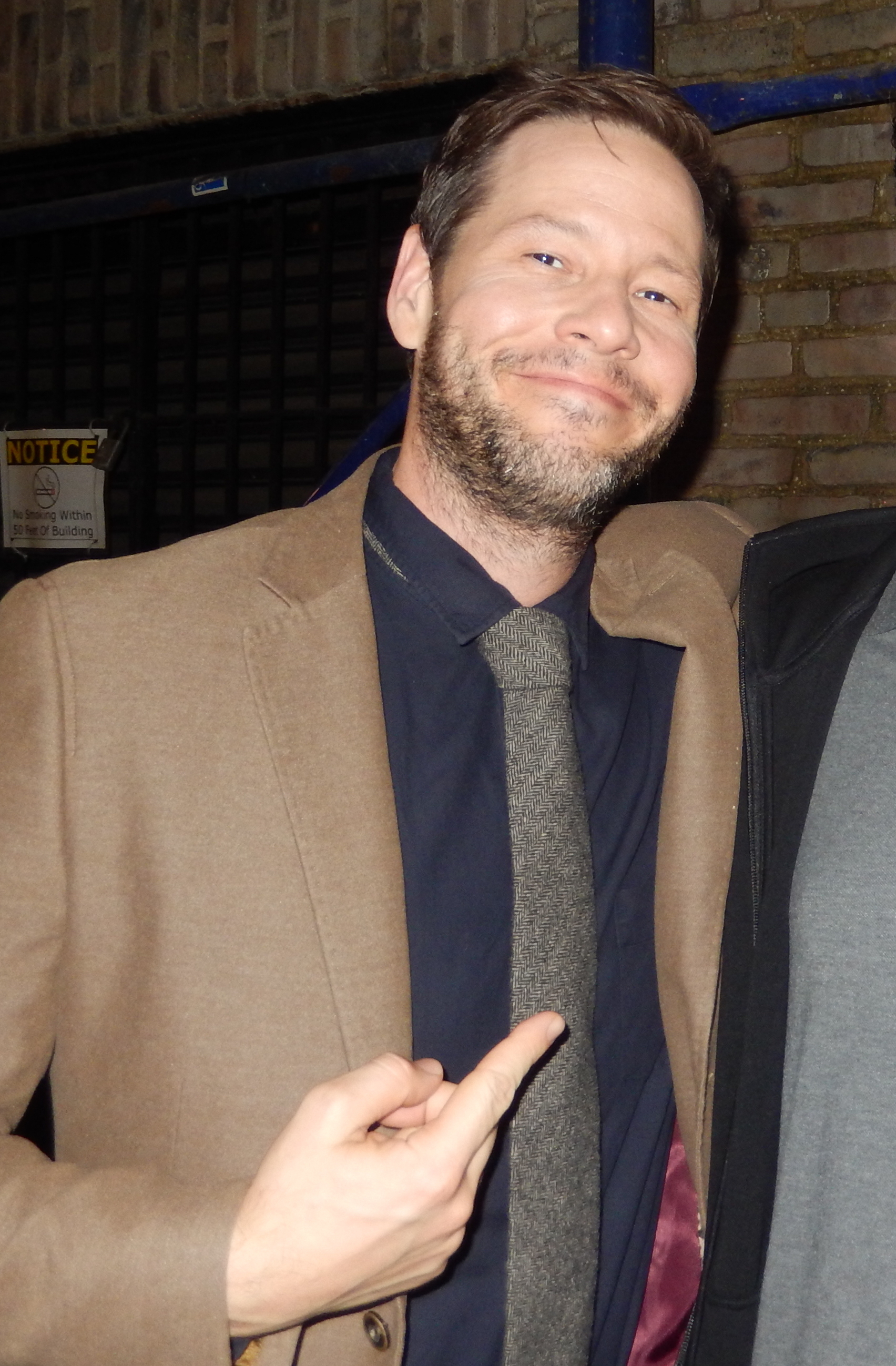
Ike Barinholtz, Best Supporting Actor in a Comedy Series winner

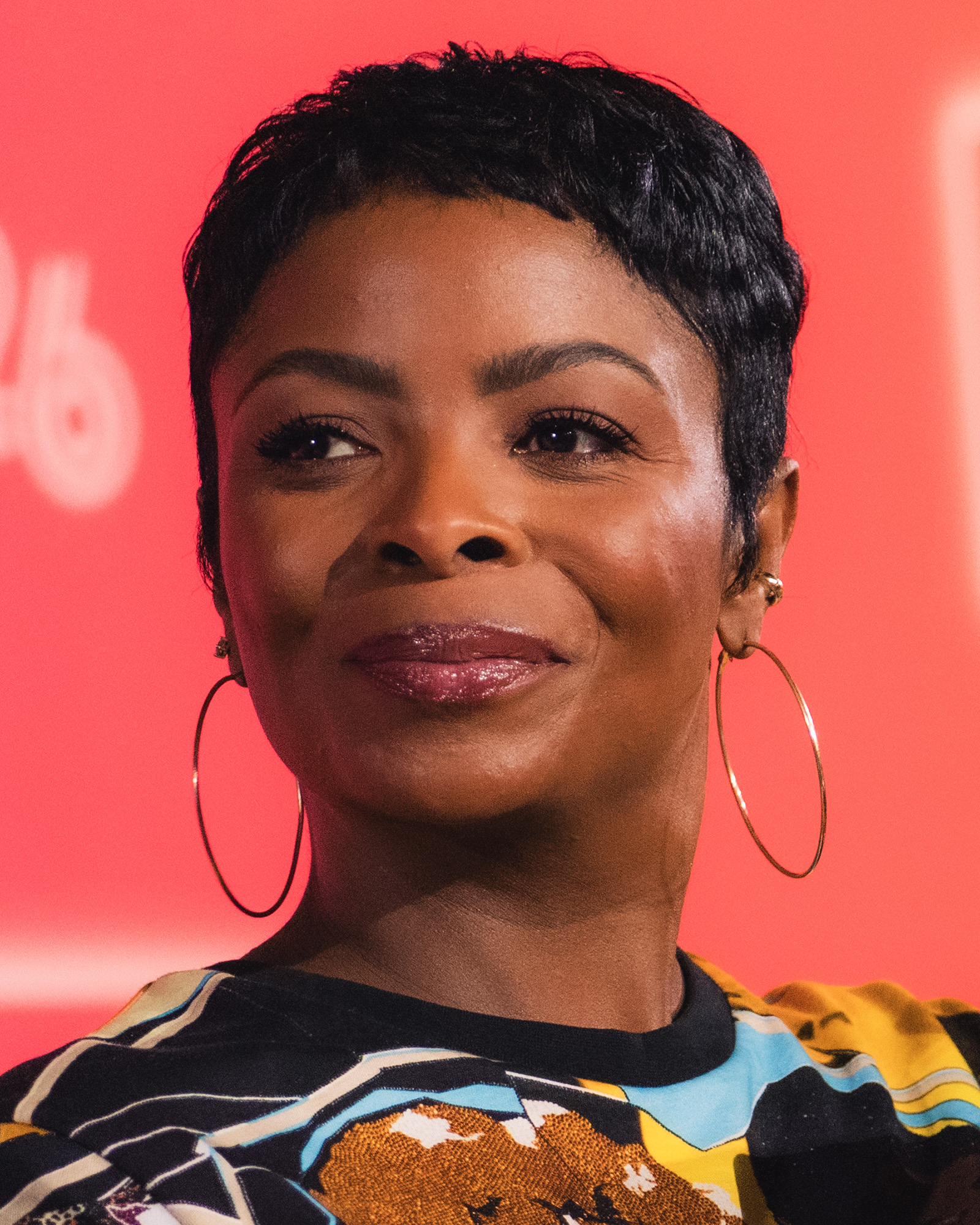
Janelle James, Best Supporting Actress in a Comedy Series winner

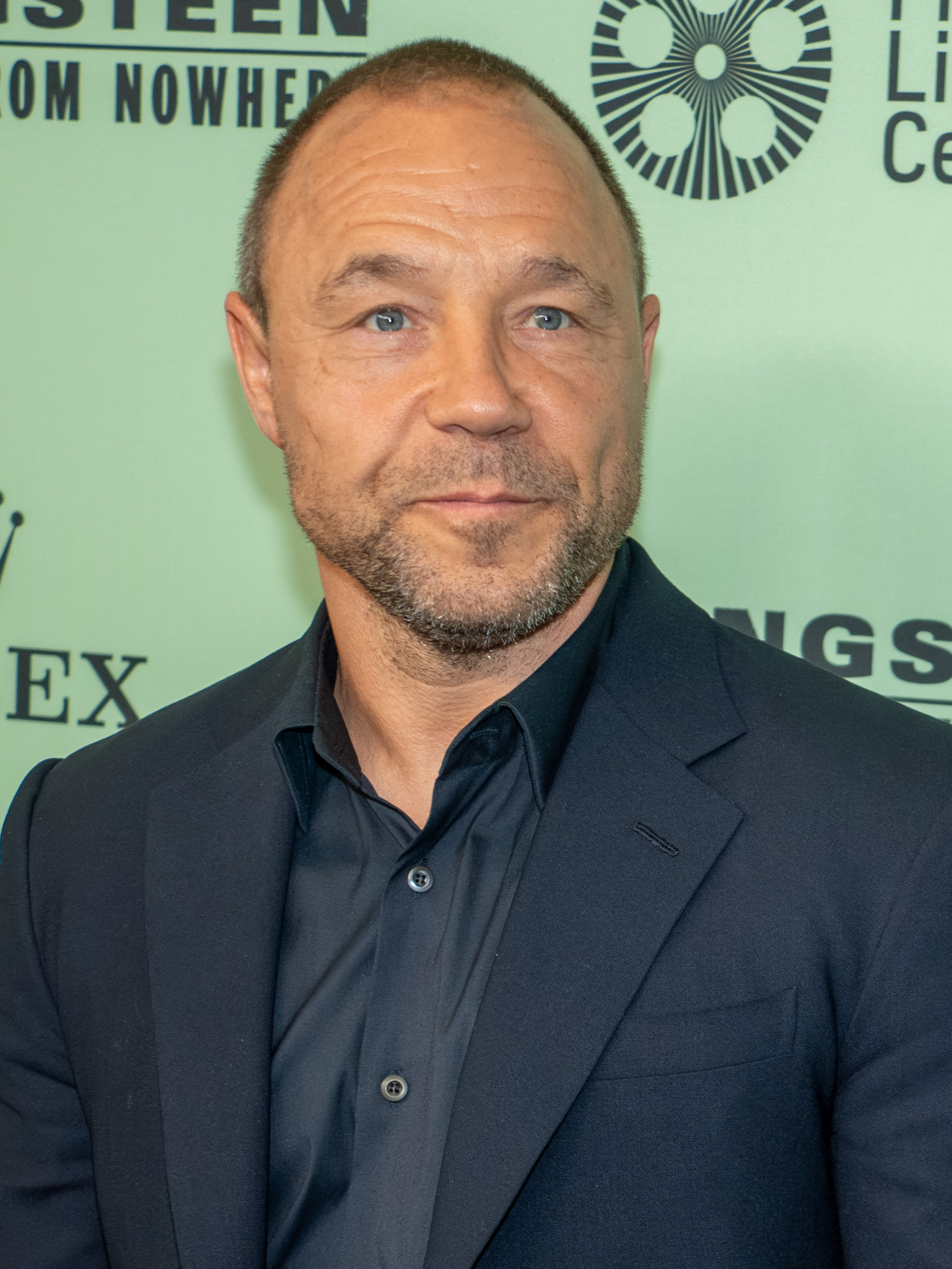
Stephen Graham, Best Actor in a Limited Series or Movie Made for Television winner

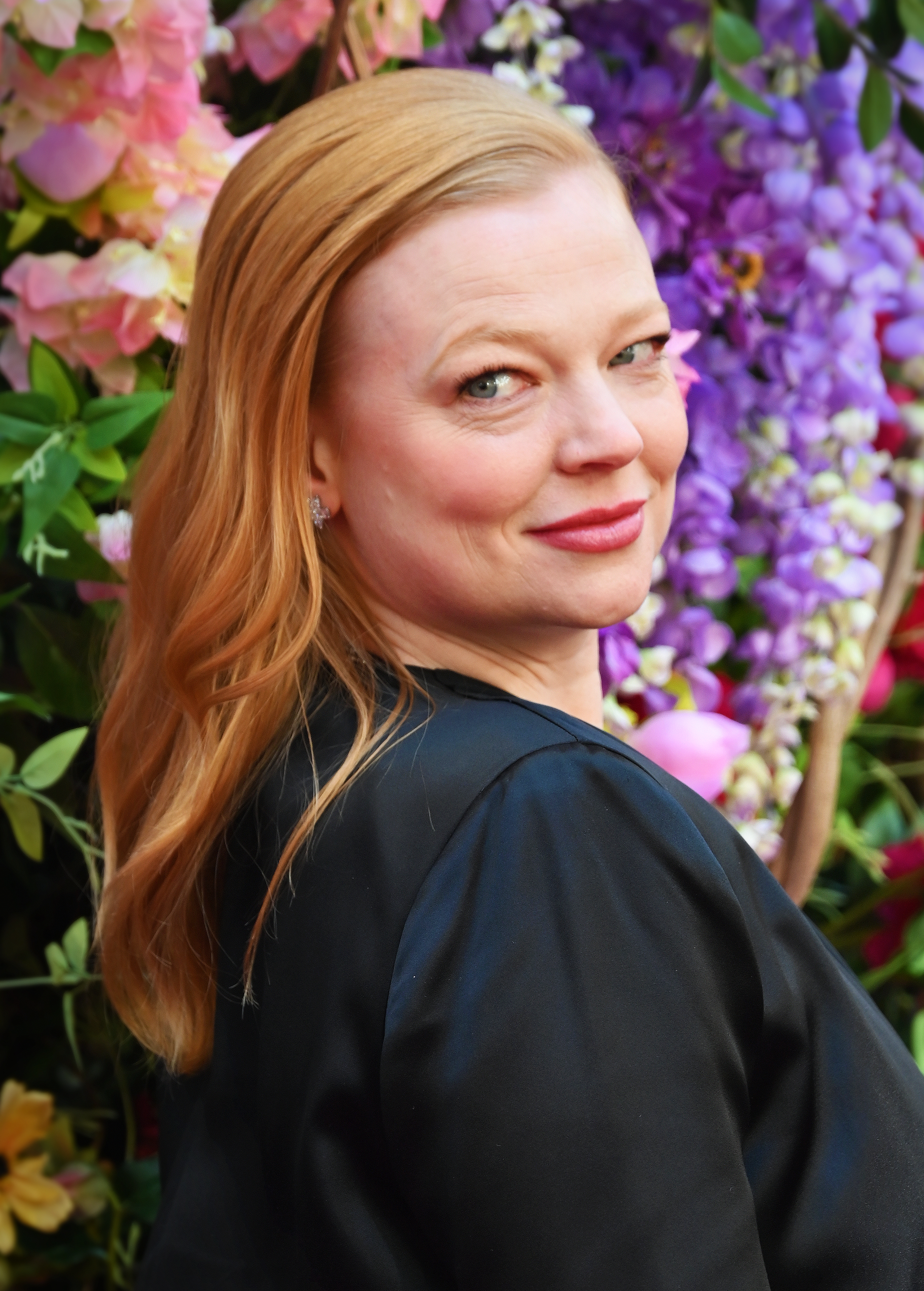
Sarah Snook, Best Actress in a Limited Series or Movie Made for Television winner

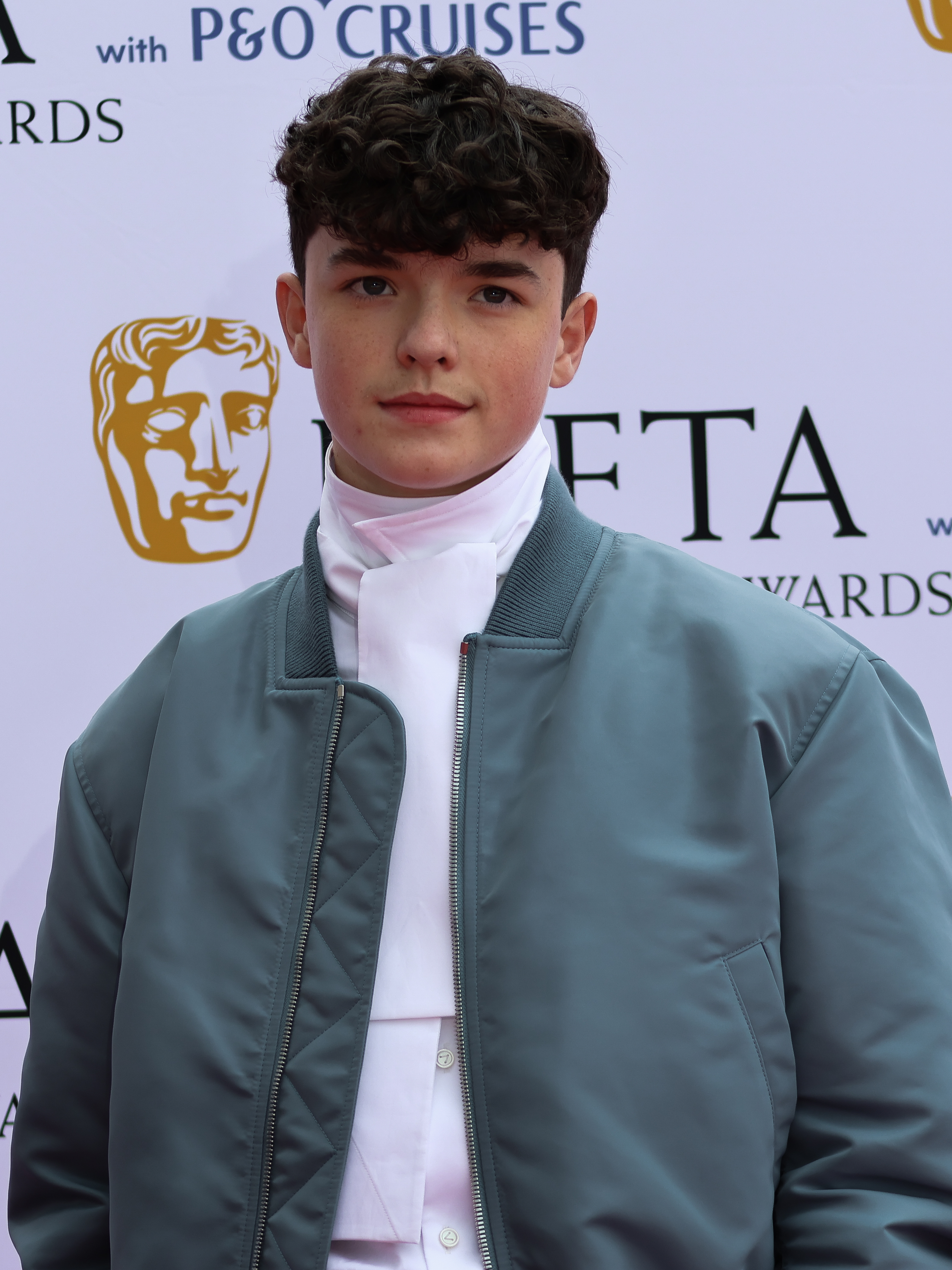
Owen Cooper, Best Supporting Actor in a Limited Series or Movie Made for Television winner

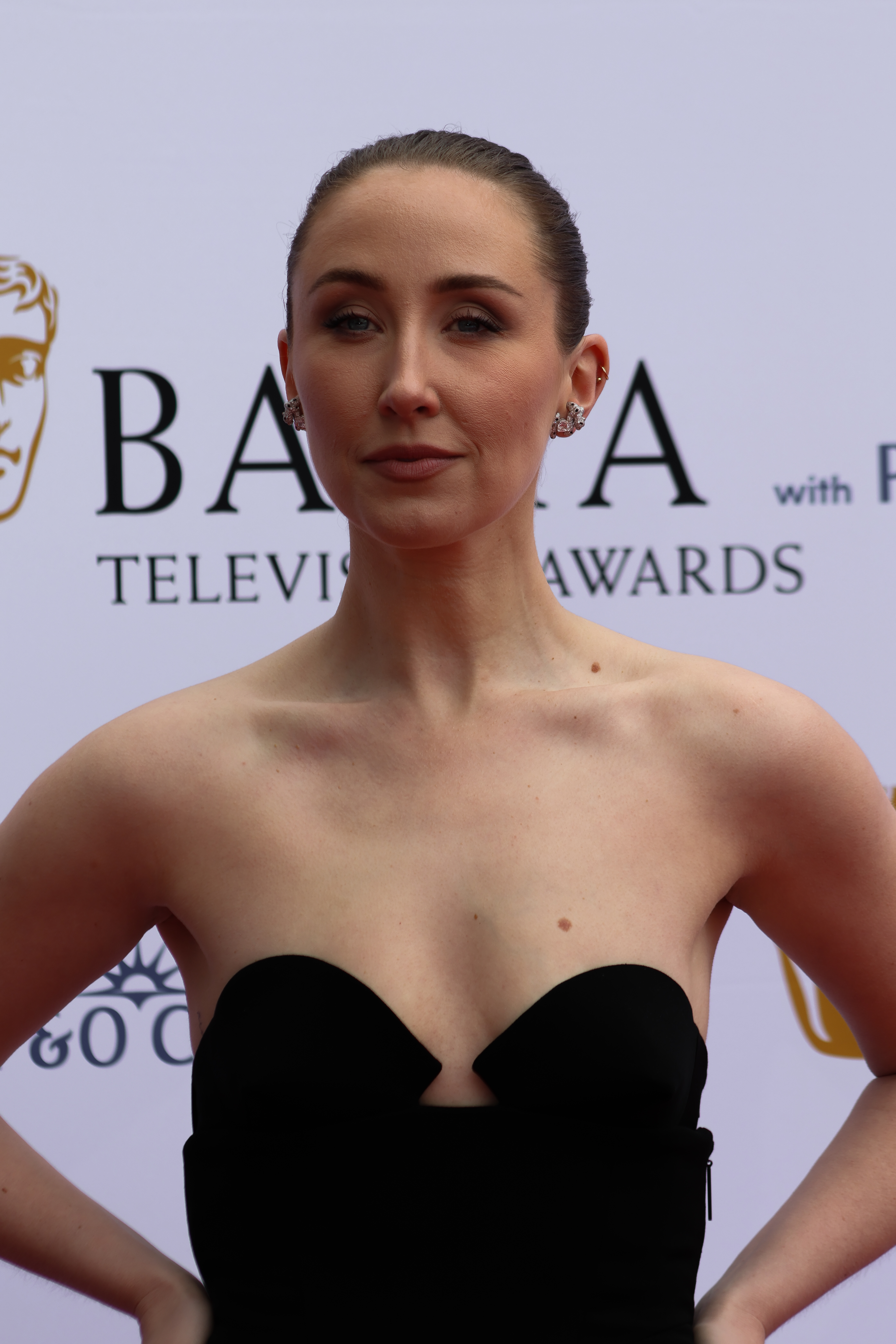
Erin Doherty, Best Supporting Actress in a Limited Series or Movie Made for Television winner

Best Drama Series: The Pitt (HBO Max); Alien: Earth (FX) (Note: Nominated for Best Science Fiction/Fantasy Series, Limited Series or Made-for-TV Movie at the 6th Critics' Choice Super Awards); Andor (Disney+) (Note: Won Best Science Fiction/Fantasy Series, Limited Series or Made-for-TV Movie at the 5th Critics' Choice Super Awards); The Diplomat (Netflix); Paradise (Hulu); Pluribus (Apple TV) (Note: Won Best Science Fiction/Fantasy Series, Limited Series or Made-for-TV Movie at the 6th Critics' Choice Super Awards); Severance (Apple TV) (Note: Nominated for Best Science Fiction/Fantasy Series, Limited Series or Made-for-TV Movie at the 5th Critics' Choice Super Awards); Task (HBO Max) (Note: Won Best Action Series, Limited Series or Made-for-TV Movie at the 6th Critics' Choice Super Awards)
Best Actor in a Drama Series: Noah Wyle – The Pitt as Dr. Michael "Robby" Robinavitch (HBO Max); Sterling K. Brown – Paradise as Xavier Collins (Hulu) (Note: Nominated for Best Actor in an Action Series, Limited Series or Made-for-TV Movie at the 5th Critics' Choice Super Awards) (Note: Won Best Actor in an Action Series, Limited Series or Made-for-TV Movie & Best Actor in a Science Fiction/Fantasy Series, Limited Series or Made-for-TV Movie at the 6th Critics' Choice Super Awards); Diego Luna – Andor as Cassian Andor (Disney+) (Note: Won Best Actor in a Science Fiction/Fantasy Series, Limited Series or Made-for-TV Movie at the 5th Critics' Choice Super Awards); Mark Ruffalo – Task as Tom Brandis (HBO Max) (Note: Nominated for Best Actor in an Action Series, Limited Series or Made-for-TV Movie at the 6th Critics' Choice Super Awards); Adam Scott – Severance as Mark Scout / Mark S. (Apple TV) (Note: Nominated for Best Actor in a Science Fiction/Fantasy Series, Limited Series or Made-for-TV Movie at the 5th Critics' Choice Super Awards); Billy Bob Thornton – Landman as Tommy Norris (Paramount+)	Best Actress in a Drama Series: Rhea Seehorn – Pluribus as Carol Sturka (Apple TV) (Note: Won Best Actress in a Science Fiction/Fantasy Series, Limited Series or Made-for-TV Movie at the 6th Critics' Choice Super Awards); Kathy Bates – Matlock as Madeline "Matty" Matlock / Madeline Kingston (CBS); Carrie Coon – The Gilded Age as Bertha Russell (HBO Max); Britt Lower – Severance as Helena Eagan / Helly R. (Apple TV) (Note: Won Best Actress in a Science Fiction/Fantasy Series, Limited Series or Made-for-TV Movie at the 5th Critics' Choice Super Awards); Bella Ramsey – The Last of Us as Ellie (HBO Max) (Note: Nominated for Best Actress in a Horror Series, Limited Series or Made-for-TV Movie at the 5th Critics' Choice Super Awards) (Note: Nominated for Best Actress in a Superhero Series, Limited Series or Made-for-TV Movie at the 5th Critics' Choice Super Awards); Keri Russell – The Diplomat as Katherine "Kate" Wyler (Netflix)
Best Supporting Actor in a Drama Series: Tramell Tillman – Severance as Seth Milchick (Apple TV); Patrick Ball – The Pitt as Dr. Frank Langdon (HBO Max); Billy Crudup – The Morning Show as Cory Ellison (Apple TV); Ato Essandoh – The Diplomat as Stuart Hayford (Netflix); Wood Harris – Forever as Eric (Netflix); Tom Pelphrey – Task as Robbie Prendergrast (HBO Max)	Best Supporting Actress in a Drama Series: Katherine LaNasa – The Pitt as Dana Evans (HBO Max); Nicole Beharie – The Morning Show as Christine Hunter (Apple TV); Denée Benton – The Gilded Age as Peggy Scott (HBO Max); Allison Janney – The Diplomat as Grace Hagen Penn (Netflix); Greta Lee – The Morning Show as Stella Bak (Apple TV); Skye P. Marshall – Matlock as Olympia Lawrence (CBS)
Best Comedy Series: The Studio (Apple TV); Abbott Elementary (ABC); Elsbeth (CBS); Ghosts (CBS) (Note: Nominated for Best Horror Series, Limited Series or Made-for-TV Movie at the 6th Critics' Choice Super Awards); Hacks (HBO Max); Nobody Wants This (Netflix); Only Murders in the Building (Hulu); The Righteous Gemstones (HBO Max)
Best Actor in a Comedy Series: Seth Rogen – The Studio as Matt Remick (Apple TV); Adam Brody – Nobody Wants This as Noah Roklov (Netflix); Ted Danson – A Man on the Inside as Charles Nieuwendyk (Netflix); David Alan Grier – St. Denis Medical as Ron (NBC); Danny McBride – The Righteous Gemstones as Jesse Gemstone (HBO Max); Alexander Skarsgård – Murderbot as Murderbot (Apple TV)	Best Actress in a Comedy Series: Jean Smart – Hacks as Deborah Vance (HBO Max); Kristen Bell – Nobody Wants This as Joanne Williams (Netflix); Natasha Lyonne – Poker Face as Charlie Cale (Peacock); Rose McIver – Ghosts as Samantha "Sam" Arondekar (CBS); Edi Patterson – The Righteous Gemstones as Judy Gemstone (HBO Max); Carrie Preston – Elsbeth as Elsbeth Tascioni (CBS)
Best Supporting Actor in a Comedy Series: Ike Barinholtz – The Studio as Sal Saperstein (Apple TV); Paul W. Downs – Hacks as Jimmy LuSaque Jr. (HBO Max); Asher Grodman – Ghosts as Trevor Lefkowitz (CBS); Oscar Nunez – The Paper as Oscar Martinez (Peacock); Chris Perfetti – Abbott Elementary as Jacob Hill (ABC); Timothy Simons – Nobody Wants This as Sasha Roklov (Netflix)	Best Supporting Actress in a Comedy Series: Janelle James – Abbott Elementary as Ava Coleman (ABC); Danielle Brooks – Peacemaker as Leota Adebayo (HBO Max) (Note: Won Best Actress in a Superhero Series, Limited Series or Made-for-TV Movie at the 6th Critics' Choice Super Awards); Hannah Einbinder – Hacks as Ava Daniels (HBO Max); Justine Lupe – Nobody Wants This as Morgan Williams (Netflix); Ego Nwodim – Saturday Night Live as Various Characters (NBC); Rebecca Wisocky – Ghosts as Henrietta "Hetty" Woodstone (CBS)
Best Limited Series: Adolescence (Netflix); All Her Fault (Peacock); Chief of War (Apple TV); Death by Lightning (Netflix); Devil in Disguise: John Wayne Gacy (Peacock); Dope Thief (Apple TV); Dying for Sex (FX on Hulu); The Girlfriend (Prime Video)	Best Movie Made for Television: Bridget Jones: Mad About the Boy (Peacock); Deep Cover (Prime Video); The Gorge (Apple TV); Mountainhead (HBO Max); Nonnas (Netflix); Summer of 69 (Hulu)
Best Actor in a Limited Series or Movie Made for Television: Stephen Graham – Adolescence as Eddie Miller (Netflix); Michael Chernus – Devil in Disguise: John Wayne Gacy as John Wayne Gacy (Peacock) (Note: Nominated for Best Actor in a Horror Series, Limited Series or Made-for-TV Movie at the 6th Critics' Choice Super Awards); Brian Tyree Henry – Dope Thief as Ray Driscoll (Apple TV); Charlie Hunnam – Monster: The Ed Gein Story as Ed Gein (Netflix); Matthew Rhys – The Beast in Me as Nile Jarvis (Netflix); Michael Shannon – Death by Lightning as James A. Garfield (Netflix)	Best Actress in a Limited Series or Movie Made for Television: Sarah Snook – All Her Fault as Marissa Irvine (Peacock); Jessica Biel – The Better Sister as Chloe Taylor (Prime Video); Meghann Fahy – Sirens as Devon DeWitt (Netflix); Michelle Williams – Dying for Sex as Molly Kochan (FX on Hulu); Robin Wright – The Girlfriend as Laura Sanderson (Prime Video); Renée Zellweger – Bridget Jones: Mad About the Boy as Bridget Jones (Peacock)
Best Supporting Actor in a Limited Series or Movie Made for Television: Owen Cooper – Adolescence as Jamie Miller (Netflix); Wagner Moura – Dope Thief as Manny Carvalho (Apple TV); Nick Offerman – Death by Lightning as Chester A. Arthur (Netflix); Michael Peña – All Her Fault as Detective Jim Alcaras (Peacock); Ashley Walters – Adolescence as DI Luke Bascombe (Netflix); Ramy Youssef – Mountainhead as Jeffrey "Jeff" Abredazi (HBO Max)	Best Supporting Actress in a Limited Series or Movie Made for Television: Erin Doherty – Adolescence as Briony Ariston (Netflix); Betty Gilpin – Death by Lightning as Lucretia Garfield (Netflix); Marin Ireland – Devil in Disguise: John Wayne Gacy as Elizabeth Piest (Peacock); Sophia Lillis – All Her Fault as Carrie Finch (Peacock); Julianne Moore – Sirens as Michaela "Kiki" Kell (Netflix); Christine Tremarco – Adolescence as Manda Miller (Netflix)
Best Animated Series: South Park (Comedy Central); Bob's Burgers (Fox); Harley Quinn (HBO Max); Long Story Short (Netflix); Marvel Zombies (Disney+); Your Friendly Neighborhood Spider-Man (Disney+)	Best Foreign Language Series: Squid Game (Netflix) • South Korea; Acapulco (Apple TV) • United States; Last Samurai Standing (Netflix) • Japan; Mussolini: Son of the Century (MUBI) • France / Italy; Red Alert (Paramount+) • Israel; When No One Sees Us (HBO Max) • Spain
Best Talk Show: Jimmy Kimmel Live! (ABC); The Daily Show (Comedy Central); Hot Ones (YouTube); Late Night with Seth Meyers (NBC); The Late Show with Stephen Colbert (CBS); Watch What Happens Live with Andy Cohen (Bravo)	Best Comedy Special: SNL50: The Anniversary Special (NBC); Brett Goldstein: The Second Best Night of Your Life (HBO Max); Caleb Hearon: Model Comedian (HBO Max); Leanne Morgan: Unspeakable Things (Netflix); Marc Maron: Panicked (HBO Max); Sarah Silverman: PostMortem (Netflix)
Best Variety Series: Last Week Tonight with John Oliver (HBO Max); Conan O'Brien Must Go (HBO Max); Saturday Night Live (NBC)

== Multiple nominations ==
=== Films ===
The following twenty films received multiple nominations:

Film	Distributor(s)	Nominations
Sinners	Warner Bros. Pictures	17
One Battle After Another	Warner Bros. Pictures	14
Frankenstein	Netflix	11
Hamnet	Focus Features	11
Marty Supreme	A24	8
F1	Apple Original Films / Warner Bros. Pictures	7
Sentimental Value	Neon	7
Wicked: For Good	Universal Pictures	7
Train Dreams	Netflix	5
Jay Kelly	Netflix	4
Weapons	Warner Bros. Pictures	4
Bugonia	Focus Features	3
KPop Demon Hunters	Netflix	2
Left-Handed Girl	Netflix	2
Mission: Impossible – The Final Reckoning	Paramount Pictures	2
No Other Choice	Neon	2
The Secret Agent	Neon	2
Sirāt	Neon	2
The Testament of Ann Lee	Searchlight Pictures	2
Warfare	A24	2

=== Television ===
The following twenty-eight series received multiple nominations:

Series	Network	Nominations
Adolescence	Netflix	6
Nobody Wants This	Netflix	5
All Her Fault	Peacock	4
Death by Lightning	Netflix	4
The Diplomat	Netflix	4
Ghosts	CBS	4
Hacks	HBO Max	4
The Pitt	HBO Max	4
Severance	Apple TV	4
Abbott Elementary	ABC	3
Devil in Disguise: John Wayne Gacy	Peacock	3
Dope Thief	Apple TV	3
The Morning Show	Apple TV	3
The Righteous Gemstones	HBO Max	3
The Studio	Apple TV	3
Task	HBO Max	3
Andor	Disney+	2
Bridget Jones: Mad About the Boy	Peacock	2
Dying for Sex	FX on Hulu	2
Elsbeth	CBS	2
The Gilded Age	HBO Max	2
The Girlfriend	Prime Video	2
Matlock	CBS	2
Mountainhead	HBO Max	2
Paradise	Hulu	2
Pluribus	Apple TV	2
Saturday Night Live	NBC	2
Sirens	Netflix	2

== Multiple wins ==
=== Films ===
The following five films received multiple awards:

Film	Distributor(s)	Wins
Frankenstein	Netflix	4
Sinners	Warner Bros. Pictures	4
One Battle After Another	Warner Bros. Pictures	3
F1	Apple Original Films / Warner Bros. Pictures	2
KPop Demon Hunters	Netflix	2

=== Television ===
The following three series received multiple awards:

Series	Network	Wins
Adolescence	Netflix	4
The Pitt	HBO Max	3
The Studio	Apple TV	3

== Presenters ==
Name(s)	Role
Noah Schnapp	Presented the award for Best Young Actor/Actress
Ali Larter; Michelle Randolph	Presented the award for Best Supporting Actress and Best Supporting Actor in a Limited Series or Movie Made for Television
Hannah Einbinder	Presented the award for Best Actor in a Limited Series or Movie Made for Television
François Arnaud; Sherry Cola	Presented the award for Best Actress in a Limited Series or Movie Made for Television
Quinta Brunson	Presented the award for Best Limited Series
Justin Hartley	Presented the award for Best Casting and Ensemble
Marcello Hernández; Sebastian Maniscalco	Presented the award for Best Talk Show
Tramell Tillman; Jessica Williams	Presented the award for Best Supporting Actress and Best Supporting Actor in a Comedy Series
Rhea Seehorn	Presented the award for Best Actor in a Comedy Series
Diego Luna	Presented the award for Best Actress in a Comedy Series
Kaley Cuoco	Presented the award for Best Comedy Series
Jessica Biel	Presented the award for Best Supporting Actor
Ethan Hawke	Presented the award for Best Supporting Actress
Arden Cho; Ejae	Presented the award for Best Supporting Actress and Best Supporting Actor in a Drama Series
Jean Smart	Presented the award for Best Actor in a Drama Series
William H. Macy	Presented the award for Best Actress in a Drama Series
Alicia Silverstone; Bradley Whitford	Presented the award for Best Drama Series
Owen Cooper; Mckenna Grace	Presented the award for Best Song and Best Animated Feature
Ava DuVernay	Presented the award for Best Director
Jeff Goldblum	Presented the award for Best Actress
Kate Hudson	Presented the award for Best Actor
Kleber Mendonça Filho; Wagner Moura	Presented the award for Best Picture

== See also ==
- 98th Academy Awards
- 77th Primetime Emmy Awards
- 5th Critics' Choice Super Awards
- 6th Critics' Choice Super Awards
- 10th Critics' Choice Documentary Awards
