= List of accolades received by Hamnet =

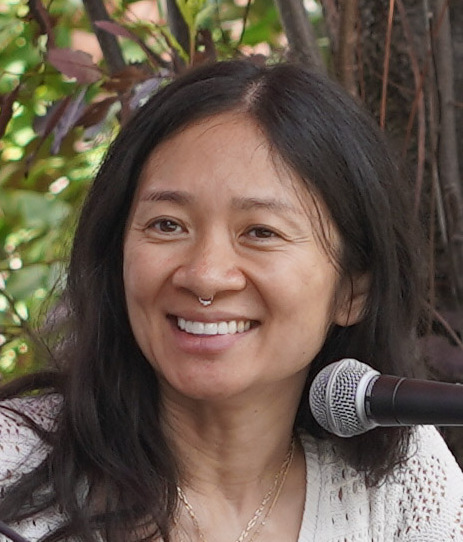
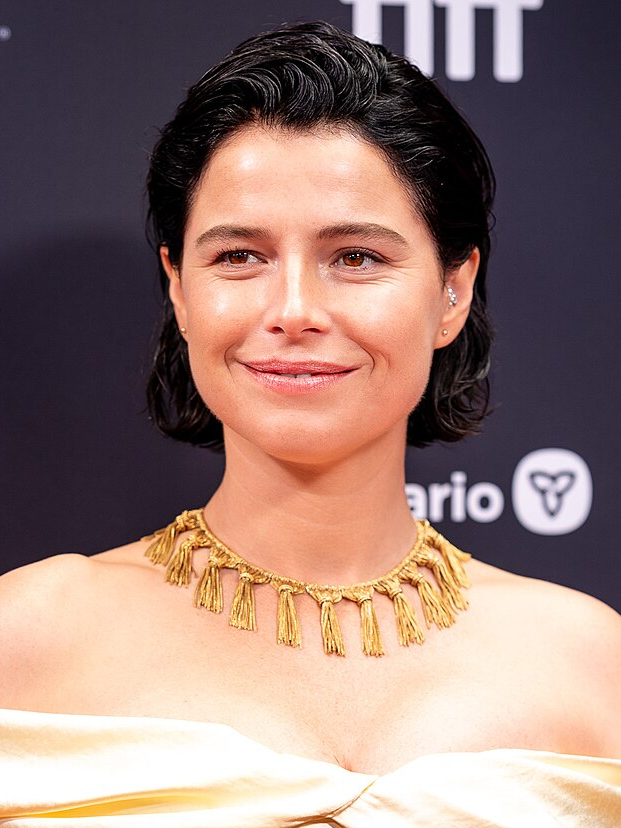
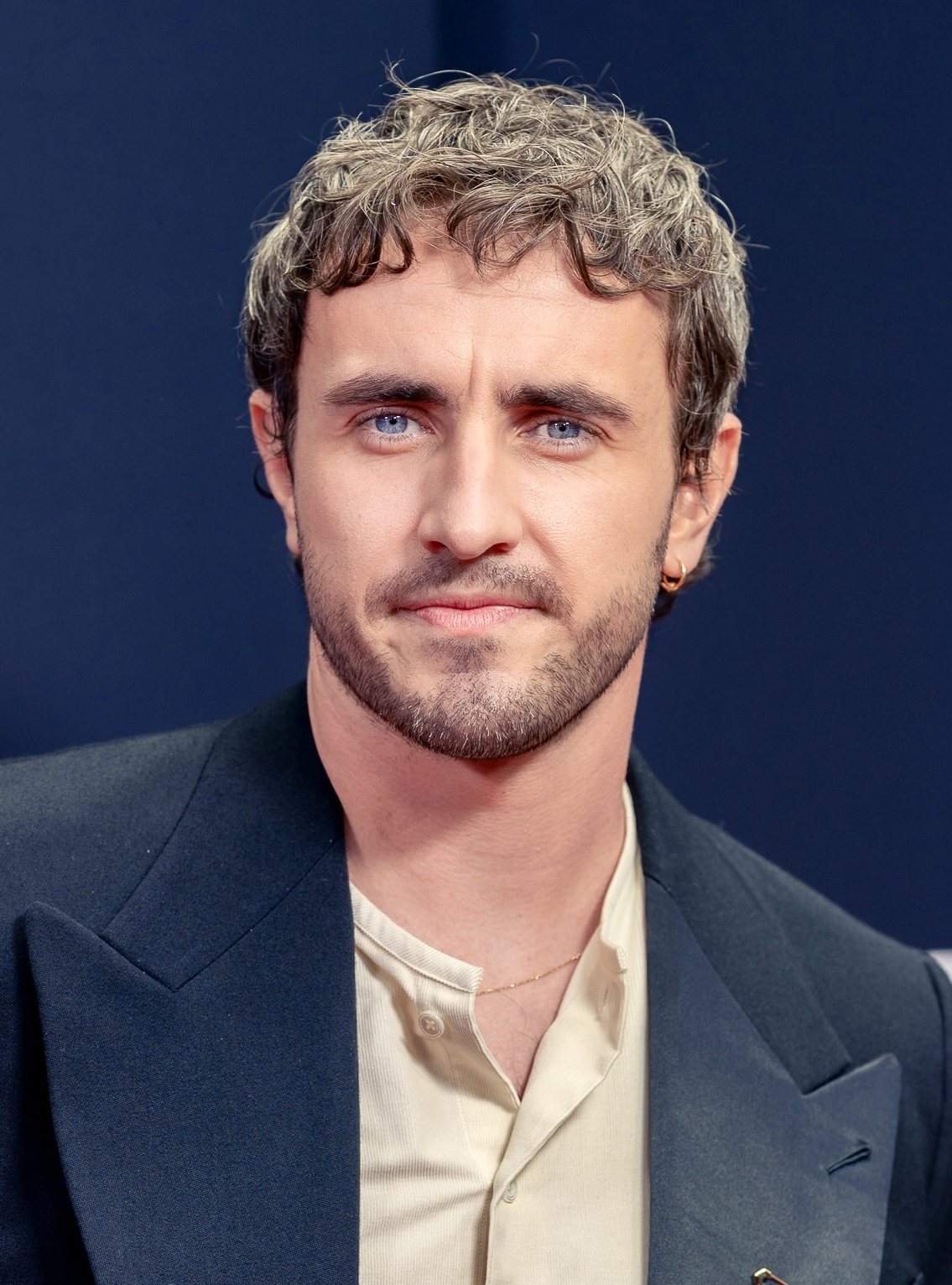
- The film received numerous accolades for Chloé Zhao's (left) direction and screenplay, and the performances of Jessie Buckley (center) and Paul Mescal (right).
Accolades
Award	Wins	Nominations
AACTA International Awards	0	6
AARP Movies for Grownups Awards	1	1
Academy Awards	1	8
Actor Awards	1	3
Alliance of Women Film Journalists	3	10
American Film Institute Awards	1	1
Astra Film Awards	2	10
Austin Film Critics Association Awards	0	1
British Academy Film Awards	2	11
BFI London Film Festival	1	1
Boston Online Film Critics Association	1	1
Camerimage	0	1
Celebration of Asian Pacific Cinema and Television	1	1
Chicago Film Critics Association	0	3
Costume Designers Guild	0	1
Critics' Choice Movie Awards	1	11
Dallas–Fort Worth Film Critics Association	4	4
Directors Guild of America Awards	0	1
Dorian Awards	0	4
Georgia Film Critics Association	1	6
Golden Globe Awards	2	6
Gotham Film Awards	0	2
Hollywood Music in Media Awards	0	1
Houston Film Critics Society	1	5
IFTA Film & Drama Awards	4	4
International Cinephile Society	0	3
Kansas City Film Critics Circle	0	4
Las Vegas Film Critics Society	0	3
Middleburg Film Festival	2	2
Mill Valley Film Festival	2	2
NAACP Image Awards	0	1
New Mexico Film Critics Association Awards	4	4
New York Film Critics Online	1	10
Online Film Critics Society	1	7
Palm Springs Film Festival	1	1
Phoenix Film Critics Society	3	3
Producers Guild of America Awards	0	1
San Diego Film Critics Society	2	9
San Diego International Film Festival	2	2
San Francisco Bay Area Film Critics Circle Awards	1	7
Satellite Awards	3	10
Seattle Film Critics Society	2	5
Society of Composers & Lyricists Awards	0	1
Southeastern Film Critics Association	2	2
St. Louis Film Critics Association	1	10
Toronto Film Critics Association	3	3
Toronto International Film Festival	1	1
Valladolid International Film Festival	1	1
Vancouver Film Critics Circle	0	4
Virginia Film Festival	1	1
Washington D.C. Area Film Critics Association Awards	1	9
Women Film Critics Circle	4	4

Totals (Note: Certain award groups do not simply award one winner. They acknowledge several different recipients, have runners-up, and have third place. Since this is a specific recognition and is different from losing an award, runner-up mentions are considered wins in this award tally. For simplification and to avoid errors, each award in this list has been presumed to have had a prior nomination.)
- Wins: 62
- Nominations: 203

Hamnet is a 2025 biographical period film directed by Chloé Zhao, who co-wrote the screenplay with Maggie O'Farrell, based on the 2020 novel by O'Farrell. The film dramatises the family life of William Shakespeare and his wife Agnes Hathaway (Note: Agnes Hathaway in the novel and film (instead of 'Anne') to avoid confusion with the actress with the same name. In her father's will, her first name was listed as Agnes. This had led some scholars and others to claim that she should be referred to as Agnes Hathaway.) as they cope with the death of their 11-year-old son Hamnet. It stars Jessie Buckley and Paul Mescal as Agnes and William, alongside Emily Watson, Joe Alwyn, and Noah Jupe in supporting roles.

Hamnet had its world premiere at the 52nd Telluride Film Festival on 29 August 2025 and received a limited theatrical release by Focus Features in the United States and Canada on 26 November. It received a wide theatrical release on 5 December and was released by Universal Pictures in the United Kingdom on 9 January 2026. Critical reception was positive, with Buckley's performance receiving particular praise. It was listed among the top ten films of 2025 by the American Film Institute. The film won Best Motion Picture – Drama and Best Actress in a Motion Picture – Drama for Buckley at the 83rd Golden Globe Awards. At the 79th British Academy Film Awards, the film won Outstanding British Film as well as Best Actress in a Leading Role for Buckley. It was also nominated in eight categories at the 98th Academy Awards, including Best Picture, Best Director and Best Actress for Buckley.

== Accolades ==
Award	Date of ceremony	Category	Nominee(s)	Result	Ref.
AACTA International Awards	6 February 2026	Best Film	Hamnet	Nominated	
AACTA International Awards	6 February 2026	Best Direction	Chloé Zhao	Nominated	
AACTA International Awards	6 February 2026	Best Actress	Jessie Buckley	Nominated	
AACTA International Awards	6 February 2026	Best Supporting Actor	Paul Mescal	Nominated	
AACTA International Awards	6 February 2026	Best Supporting Actress	Emily Watson	Nominated	
AACTA International Awards	6 February 2026	Best Screenplay	Chloé Zhao and Maggie O'Farrell	Nominated	
AARP Movies for Grownups Awards	10 January 2026	Best Picture	Hamnet	Won	
Academy Awards	15 March 2026	Best Picture	Liza Marshall, Pippa Harris, Nicolas Gonda, Steven Spielberg, and Sam Mendes	Nominated	
Academy Awards	15 March 2026	Best Director	Chloé Zhao	Nominated	
Academy Awards	15 March 2026	Best Actress	Jessie Buckley	Won	
Academy Awards	15 March 2026	Best Adapted Screenplay	Chloé Zhao and Maggie O'Farrell	Nominated	
Academy Awards	15 March 2026	Best Casting	Nina Gold	Nominated	
Academy Awards	15 March 2026	Best Costume Design	Malgosia Turzanska	Nominated	
Academy Awards	15 March 2026	Best Production Design	Fiona Crombie and Alice Felton	Nominated	
Academy Awards	15 March 2026	Best Original Score	Max Richter	Nominated	
Actor Awards	1 March 2026	Outstanding Performance by a Cast in a Motion Picture	Joe Alwyn, Jessie Buckley, Noah Jupe, Paul Mescal, and Emily Watson	Nominated	
Actor Awards	1 March 2026	Outstanding Performance by a Female Actor in a Leading Role	Jessie Buckley	Won	
Actor Awards	1 March 2026	Outstanding Performance by a Male Actor in a Supporting Role	Paul Mescal	Nominated	
Alliance of Women Film Journalists	31 December 2025	Best Film	Hamnet	Nominated	
Alliance of Women Film Journalists	31 December 2025	Best Director	Chloé Zhao	Nominated	
Alliance of Women Film Journalists	31 December 2025	Best Actress	Jessie Buckley	Won	
Alliance of Women Film Journalists	31 December 2025	Best Actor, Supporting	Paul Mescal	Nominated	
Alliance of Women Film Journalists	31 December 2025	Best Screenplay, Adapted	Chloé Zhao and Maggie O'Farrell	Won	
Alliance of Women Film Journalists	31 December 2025	Best Ensemble Cast & Casting Director	Nina Gold & Lucy Amos	Nominated	
Alliance of Women Film Journalists	31 December 2025	Best Cinematography	Łukasz Żal	Nominated	
Alliance of Women Film Journalists	31 December 2025	Best Editing	Affonso Gonçalves & Chloé Zhao	Nominated	
Alliance of Women Film Journalists	31 December 2025	Best Female Director	Chloé Zhao	Won	
Alliance of Women Film Journalists	31 December 2025	Best Female Writer	Chloé Zhao and Maggie O'Farrell	Nominated	
American Film Institute Awards	4 December 2025	Top 10 Films	Hamnet	Won (Note: Also awarded to nine other films.)	
Astra Film Awards	9 January 2026	Best Picture - Drama	Hamnet	Nominated	
Astra Film Awards	9 January 2026	Best Director	Chloé Zhao	Nominated	
Astra Film Awards	9 January 2026	Best Actress - Drama	Jessie Buckley	Won	
Astra Film Awards	9 January 2026	Best Supporting Actor - Drama	Paul Mescal	Nominated	
Astra Film Awards	9 January 2026	Best Adapted Screenplay	Chloé Zhao and Maggie O'Farrell	Nominated	
Astra Film Awards	9 January 2026	Best Young Performer	Jacobi Jupe	Won	
Astra Film Awards	9 January 2026	Best Original Score	Max Richter	Nominated	
Astra Film Awards	11 December 2025	Best Cinematography	Łukasz Żal	Nominated	
Astra Film Awards	11 December 2025	Best Costume Design	Malgosia Turzanska	Nominated	
Astra Film Awards	11 December 2025	Best Production Design	Fiona Crombie and Alice Felton	Nominated	
Austin Film Critics Association	18 December 2025	Best Actress	Jessie Buckley	Nominated	
British Academy Film Awards	22 February 2026	Best Film	Liza Marshall, Pippa Harris, Nicolas Gonda, Steven Spielberg, and Sam Mendes	Nominated	
British Academy Film Awards	22 February 2026	Best Director	Chloé Zhao	Nominated	
British Academy Film Awards	22 February 2026	Best Actress in a Leading Role	Jessie Buckley	Won	
British Academy Film Awards	22 February 2026	Best Actor in a Supporting Role	Paul Mescal	Nominated	
British Academy Film Awards	22 February 2026	Best Actress in a Supporting Role	Emily Watson	Nominated	
British Academy Film Awards	22 February 2026	Best Adapted Screenplay	Chloé Zhao and Maggie O'Farrell	Nominated	
British Academy Film Awards	22 February 2026	Best Costume Design	Malgosia Turzanska	Nominated	
British Academy Film Awards	22 February 2026	Best Production Design	Fiona Crombie and Alice Felton	Nominated	
British Academy Film Awards	22 February 2026	Best Makeup and Hair	Nicole Stafford	Nominated	
British Academy Film Awards	22 February 2026	Best Original Score	Max Richter	Nominated	
British Academy Film Awards	22 February 2026	Outstanding British Film	Chloé Zhao, Liza Marshall, Pippa Harris, Nicolas Gonda, Steven Spielberg, Sam Mendes, and Maggie O'Farrell	Won	
BFI London Film Festival	6 November 2025	Audience Award for Best Feature	Hamnet	Won	
Boston Online Film Critics Association	20 December 2025	Top Ten Films of 2025	Hamnet	8th place	
Camerimage	22 November 2025	Golden Frog	Łukasz Żal	Nominated	
Celebration of Asian Pacific Cinema and Television	14 November 2025	Vanguard Award	Chloé Zhao	Won	
Chicago Film Critics Association	11 December 2025	Best Actress	Jessie Buckley	Nominated	
Chicago Film Critics Association	11 December 2025	Best Adapted Screenplay	Chloé Zhao and Maggie O'Farrell	Nominated	
Chicago Film Critics Association	11 December 2025	Best Cinematography	Łukasz Żal	Nominated	
Costume Designers Guild	12 February 2026	Excellence in Period Film	Malgosia Turzanska	Nominated	
Critics' Choice Movie Awards	4 January 2026	Best Picture	Hamnet	Nominated	
Critics' Choice Movie Awards	4 January 2026	Best Director	Chloé Zhao	Nominated	
Critics' Choice Movie Awards	4 January 2026	Best Actress	Jessie Buckley	Won	
Critics' Choice Movie Awards	4 January 2026	Best Supporting Actor	Paul Mescal	Nominated	
Critics' Choice Movie Awards	4 January 2026	Best Young Actor/Actress	Jacobi Jupe	Nominated	
Critics' Choice Movie Awards	4 January 2026	Best Casting and Ensemble	Nina Gold	Nominated	
Critics' Choice Movie Awards	4 January 2026	Best Adapted Screenplay	Chloé Zhao and Maggie O'Farrell	Nominated	
Critics' Choice Movie Awards	4 January 2026	Best Cinematography	Łukasz Żal	Nominated	
Critics' Choice Movie Awards	4 January 2026	Best Costume Design	Malgosia Turzanska	Nominated	
Critics' Choice Movie Awards	4 January 2026	Best Production Design	Fiona Crombie and Alice Felton	Nominated	
Critics' Choice Movie Awards	4 January 2026	Best Score	Max Richter	Nominated	
Dallas–Fort Worth Film Critics Association	17 December 2025	Best Picture	Hamnet	4th place	
Dallas–Fort Worth Film Critics Association	17 December 2025	Best Director	Chloé Zhao	3rd place	
Dallas–Fort Worth Film Critics Association	17 December 2025	Best Actress	Jessie Buckley	Runner-up	
Dallas–Fort Worth Film Critics Association	17 December 2025	Best Supporting Actor	Paul Mescal	4th place	
Directors Guild of America Awards	7 February 2026	Outstanding Directing – Feature Film	Chloé Zhao	Nominated	
Dorian Awards	3 March 2026	Film of the Year	Hamnet	Nominated	
Dorian Awards	3 March 2026	Director of the Year	Chloé Zhao	Nominated	
Dorian Awards	3 March 2026	Film Performance of the Year	Jessie Buckley	Nominated	
Dorian Awards	3 March 2026	Screenplay of the Year	Chloé Zhao and Maggie O'Farrell	Nominated	
Georgia Film Critics Association	27 December 2025	Best Picture	Hamnet	Nominated	
Georgia Film Critics Association	27 December 2025	Best Director	Chloé Zhao	Nominated	
Georgia Film Critics Association	27 December 2025	Best Actress	Jessie Buckley	Won	
Georgia Film Critics Association	27 December 2025	Best Adapted Screenplay	Chloé Zhao and Maggie O'Farrell	Nominated	
Georgia Film Critics Association	27 December 2025	Best Production Design	Fiona Crombie and Alice Felton	Nominated	
Georgia Film Critics Association	27 December 2025	Best Original Score	Max Richter	Nominated	
Golden Globe Awards	11 January 2026	Best Motion Picture - Drama	Hamnet	Won	
Golden Globe Awards	11 January 2026	Best Director	Chloé Zhao	Nominated	
Golden Globe Awards	11 January 2026	Best Actress in a Motion Picture - Drama	Jessie Buckley	Won	
Golden Globe Awards	11 January 2026	Best Supporting Actor - Motion Picture	Paul Mescal	Nominated	
Golden Globe Awards	11 January 2026	Best Screenplay	Chloé Zhao and Maggie O'Farrell	Nominated	
Golden Globe Awards	11 January 2026	Best Original Score	Max Richter	Nominated	
Gotham Film Awards	1 December 2025	Best Feature	Liza Marshall, Nicolas Gonda, Pippa Harris, Sam Mendes, and Steven Spielberg	Nominated	
Gotham Film Awards	1 December 2025	Outstanding Lead Performance	Jessie Buckley	Nominated	
Hollywood Music in Media Awards	19 November 2025	Best Original Score in a Feature Film	Max Richter	Nominated	
Houston Film Critics Society	20 January 2026	Best Picture	Hamnet	Nominated	
Houston Film Critics Society	20 January 2026	Best Director	Chloé Zhao	Nominated	
Houston Film Critics Society	20 January 2026	Best Actress	Jessie Buckley	Won	
Houston Film Critics Society	20 January 2026	Best Supporting Actor	Paul Mescal	Nominated	
Houston Film Critics Society	20 January 2026	Best Casting	Nina Gold	Nominated	
IFTA Film & Drama Awards	February 20, 2026	Best Lead Actress	Jessie Buckley	Won	
IFTA Film & Drama Awards	February 20, 2026	Best Supporting Actor	Paul Mescal	Won	
IFTA Film & Drama Awards	February 20, 2026	Best Script	Maggie O'Farrell and Chloe Zhao	Won	
IFTA Film & Drama Awards	February 20, 2026	Best International Film	Hamnet	Won	
International Cinephile Society	8 February 2026	Best Picture	Hamnet	Nominated	
International Cinephile Society	8 February 2026	Best Actress	Jessie Buckley	Nominated	
International Cinephile Society	8 February 2026	Best Adapted Screenplay	Chloé Zhao and Maggie O'Farrell	Nominated	
Kansas City Film Critics Circle	21 December 2025	Best Film	Hamnet	Nominated	
Kansas City Film Critics Circle	21 December 2025	Best Actress	Jessie Buckley	Nominated	
Kansas City Film Critics Circle	21 December 2025	Best Adapted Screenplay	Chloé Zhao and Maggie O'Farrell	Nominated	
Kansas City Film Critics Circle	21 December 2025	Best Cinematography	Łukasz Żal	Nominated	
Las Vegas Film Critics Society	19 December 2025	Best Actress	Jessie Buckley	Nominated	
Las Vegas Film Critics Society	19 December 2025	Best Costume Design	Malgosia Turzanska	Nominated	
Las Vegas Film Critics Society	19 December 2025	Youth Male Performance	Jacobi Jupe	Nominated	
Middleburg Film Festival	19 October 2025	Visionary Director Award	Chloé Zhao	Honored	
Middleburg Film Festival	20 October 2025	Narrative Feature Audience Award	Hamnet	Won (Note: Award shared with Rental Family.)	
Mill Valley Film Festival	3 October 2025	Mill Valley Film Festival Award	Jessie Buckley	Honored	
Mill Valley Film Festival	14 October 2025	Overall Audience Favorite	Hamnet	Won	
NAACP Image Awards	28 February 2026	Outstanding Writing in a Motion Picture	Chloé Zhao	Nominated	
New Mexico Film Critics Association Awards	December 21, 2025	Best Picture	Hamnet	Won	
New Mexico Film Critics Association Awards	December 21, 2025	Best Director	Chloé Zhao	Won	
New Mexico Film Critics Association Awards	December 21, 2025	Best Adapted Screenplay	Chloé Zhao and Maggie O’Farrell	Won	
New Mexico Film Critics Association Awards	December 21, 2025	Best Editing	Affonso Gonçalves and Chloé Zhao	Won	
National Film Awards UK	1 July 2026	Best Drama	Hamnet	Nominated	
National Film Awards UK	1 July 2026	Best Director	Chloé Zhao	Nominated	
National Film Awards UK	1 July 2026	Best Actress	Jessie Buckley	Nominated	
National Film Awards UK	1 July 2026	Best Supporting Actress	Emily Watson	Nominated	
National Film Awards UK	1 July 2026	Best Supporting Actor	Paul Mescal	Nominated	
National Film Awards UK	1 July 2026	Outstanding Performance	Jacobi Jupe	Nominated	
New York Film Critics Online	15 December 2025	Best Picture	Hamnet	Nominated	
New York Film Critics Online	15 December 2025	Best Director	Chloé Zhao	Nominated	
New York Film Critics Online	15 December 2025	Best Actress	Jessie Buckley	Won	
New York Film Critics Online	15 December 2025	Best Supporting Actor	Noah Jupe	Nominated	
New York Film Critics Online	15 December 2025	Best Supporting Actor	Paul Mescal	Nominated	
New York Film Critics Online	15 December 2025	Best Screenplay	Chloé Zhao and Maggie O'Farrell	Nominated	
New York Film Critics Online	15 December 2025	Best Ensemble Cast	Hamnet	Nominated	
New York Film Critics Online	15 December 2025	Best Cinematography	Łukasz Żal	Nominated	
New York Film Critics Online	15 December 2025	Best Use of Music	Hamnet	Nominated	
New York Film Critics Online	15 December 2025	Best Breakthrough Performer	Jacobi Jupe	Nominated	
Online Film Critics Society	26 January 2026	Best Picture	Hamnet	Nominated	
Online Film Critics Society	26 January 2026	Best Director	Chloé Zhao	Nominated	
Online Film Critics Society	26 January 2026	Best Actress	Jessie Buckley	Won	
Online Film Critics Society	26 January 2026	Best Adapted Screenplay	Chloé Zhao and Maggie O'Farrell	Nominated	
Online Film Critics Society	26 January 2026	Best Cinematography	Łukasz Żal	Nominated	
Online Film Critics Society	26 January 2026	Best Costume Design	Malgosia Turzanska	Nominated	
Online Film Critics Society	26 January 2026	Best Production Design	Fiona Crombie and Alice Felton	Nominated	
Palm Springs Film Festival	2 January 2026	Vanguard Award	Hamnet	Honored	
Phoenix Film Critics Society	15 December 2025	Top Ten Films	Hamnet	Won	
Phoenix Film Critics Society	15 December 2025	Best Actress in a Leading Role	Jessie Buckley	Won	
Phoenix Film Critics Society	15 December 2025	Best Performance by a Youth	Jacobi Jupe	Won	
Producers Guild of America Awards	28 February 2026	Best Theatrical Motion Picture	Liza Marshall, Pippa Harris, Nicolas Gonda, Steven Spielberg, and Sam Mendes	Nominated	
San Diego Film Critics Society	15 December 2025	Best Film	Hamnet	Nominated	
San Diego Film Critics Society	15 December 2025	Best Director	Chloé Zhao	Nominated	
San Diego Film Critics Society	15 December 2025	Best Actress	Jessie Buckley	Won (Note: Tied with Rose Byrne for If I Had Legs I'd Kick You.)	
San Diego Film Critics Society	15 December 2025	Best Adapted Screenplay	Chloé Zhao and Maggie O'Farrell	Nominated	
San Diego Film Critics Society	15 December 2025	Best Cinematography	Łukasz Żal	Nominated	
San Diego Film Critics Society	15 December 2025	Best Editing	Affonso Gonçalves and Chloé Zhao	Nominated	
San Diego Film Critics Society	15 December 2025	Best Costume Design	Malgosia Turzanska	Nominated	
San Diego Film Critics Society	15 December 2025	Best Production Design	Fiona Crombie and Alice Felton	Nominated	
San Diego Film Critics Society	15 December 2025	Best Youth Performance	Jacobi Jupe	Runner-up	
San Diego International Film Festival	19 October 2025	Best Gala Film	Hamnet	Won	
San Diego International Film Festival	22 October 2025	Audience Choice: Best Gala Film	Hamnet	Won	
San Francisco Bay Area Film Critics Circle	14 December 2025	Best Film	Hamnet	Nominated	
San Francisco Bay Area Film Critics Circle	14 December 2025	Best Director	Chloé Zhao	Nominated	
San Francisco Bay Area Film Critics Circle	14 December 2025	Best Actress	Jessie Buckley	Runner-up	
San Francisco Bay Area Film Critics Circle	14 December 2025	Best Supporting Actor	Paul Mescal	Nominated	
San Francisco Bay Area Film Critics Circle	14 December 2025	Best Adapted Screenplay	Chloé Zhao and Maggie O'Farrell	Nominated	
San Francisco Bay Area Film Critics Circle	14 December 2025	Best Cinematography	Łukasz Żal	Nominated	
San Francisco Bay Area Film Critics Circle	14 December 2025	Best Production Design	Fiona Crombie and Alice Felton	Nominated	
Satellite Awards	10 March 2026	Best Motion Picture - Drama	Hamnet	Won	
Satellite Awards	10 March 2026	Best Director	Chloé Zhao	Won	
Satellite Awards	10 March 2026	Best Actress in a Motion Picture - Drama	Jessie Buckley	Won	
Satellite Awards	10 March 2026	Best Actor in a Supporting Role	Paul Mescal	Nominated	
Satellite Awards	10 March 2026	Best Adapted Screenplay	Chloé Zhao and Maggie O'Farrell	Nominated	
Satellite Awards	10 March 2026	Best Cinematography	Łukasz Żal	Nominated	
Satellite Awards	10 March 2026	Best Editing	Affonso Gonçalves and Chloé Zhao	Nominated	
Satellite Awards	10 March 2026	Best Costume Design	Malgosia Turzanska	Nominated	
Satellite Awards	10 March 2026	Best Production Design	Fiona Crombie and Alice Felton	Nominated	
Satellite Awards	10 March 2026	Best Original Score	Max Richter	Nominated	
Seattle Film Critics Society	15 December 2025	Best Picture	Hamnet	Nominated	
Seattle Film Critics Society	15 December 2025	Best Director	Chloé Zhao	Nominated	
Seattle Film Critics Society	15 December 2025	Best Actress in a Leading Role	Jessie Buckley	Won	
Seattle Film Critics Society	15 December 2025	Best Cinematography	Łukasz Żal	Nominated	
Seattle Film Critics Society	15 December 2025	Best Youth Performance	Jacobi Jupe	Won	
Society of Composers & Lyricists Awards	6 February 2026	Outstanding Original Score for a Studio Film	Max Richter	Nominated	
Southeastern Film Critics Association	15 December 2025	Top 10 Films of 2025	Hamnet	6th place	
Southeastern Film Critics Association	15 December 2025	Best Actress	Jessie Buckley	Won	
St. Louis Film Critics Association Awards	14 December 2025	Best Film	Hamnet	Nominated	
St. Louis Film Critics Association Awards	14 December 2025	Best Director	Chloé Zhao	Nominated	
St. Louis Film Critics Association Awards	14 December 2025	Best Actress	Jessie Buckley	Won	
St. Louis Film Critics Association Awards	14 December 2025	Best Supporting Actor	Paul Mescal	Nominated	
St. Louis Film Critics Association Awards	14 December 2025	Best Adapted Screenplay	Chloé Zhao and Maggie O'Farrell	Nominated	
St. Louis Film Critics Association Awards	14 December 2025	Best Cinematography	Łukasz Żal	Nominated	
St. Louis Film Critics Association Awards	14 December 2025	Best Music Score	Max Richter	Nominated	
St. Louis Film Critics Association Awards	14 December 2025	Best Costume Design	Malgosia Turzanska	Nominated	
St. Louis Film Critics Association Awards	14 December 2025	Best Production Design	Fiona Crombie and Alice Felton	Nominated	
St. Louis Film Critics Association Awards	14 December 2025	Best Scene	The Globe theatrical production	Nominated	
Toronto Film Critics Association	7 December 2025	Best Picture	Hamnet	Runner-up	
Toronto Film Critics Association	7 December 2025	Outstanding Lead Performance	Jessie Buckley	Runner-up	
Toronto Film Critics Association	7 December 2025	Best Adapted Screenplay	Chloé Zhao and Maggie O'Farrell	Runner-up	
Toronto International Film Festival	14 September 2025	People's Choice Award	Hamnet	Won	
Valladolid International Film Festival	1 November 2025	Audience Award	Hamnet	Won	
Vancouver Film Critics Circle	23 February 2026	Best Picture	Hamnet	Nominated	
Vancouver Film Critics Circle	23 February 2026	Best Director	Chloé Zhao	Nominated	
Vancouver Film Critics Circle	23 February 2026	Best Female Actor	Jessie Buckley	Won	
Vancouver Film Critics Circle	23 February 2026	Best Screenplay	Chloé Zhao and Maggie O'Farrell	Nominated	
Virginia Film Festival	30 October 2025	Narrative Feature Audience Award	Hamnet	Won	
Washington D.C. Area Film Critics Association	7 December 2025	Best Film	Hamnet	Nominated	
Washington D.C. Area Film Critics Association	7 December 2025	Best Director	Chloé Zhao	Nominated	
Washington D.C. Area Film Critics Association	7 December 2025	Best Actress	Jessie Buckley	Won	
Washington D.C. Area Film Critics Association	7 December 2025	Best Youth Performance	Jacobi Jupe	Nominated	
Washington D.C. Area Film Critics Association	7 December 2025	Best Ensemble	Hamnet	Nominated	
Washington D.C. Area Film Critics Association	7 December 2025	Best Adapted Screenplay	Chloé Zhao and Maggie O'Farrell	Nominated	
Washington D.C. Area Film Critics Association	7 December 2025	Best Editing	Affonso Gonçalves and Chloé Zhao	Nominated	
Washington D.C. Area Film Critics Association	7 December 2025	Best Production Design	Fiona Crombie and Alice Felton	Nominated	
Washington D.C. Area Film Critics Association	7 December 2025	Best Score	Max Richter	Nominated	
Women Film Critics Circle	21 December 2025	Best Movie About Women	Hamnet	Runner-up	
Women Film Critics Circle	21 December 2025	Best Movie By a Woman	Chloé Zhao	Won	
Women Film Critics Circle	21 December 2025	Best Actress	Jessie Buckley	Won	
Women Film Critics Circle	21 December 2025	Best Screen Couple	Jessie Buckley and Paul Mescal	Runner-up	
