= Land (O'Farrell novel) =

2026 novel by Maggie O'Farrell

Land by Maggie O'Farrell
- 2026 hardcover book jacket
- Author: Maggie O'Farrell
- Audio read by: Dane Whyte O'Hara
- Cover artist: Cat O'Neil
- Language: English
- Subject: Family, Irish Potato Famine
- Genre: Historical fiction
- Set in: mostly, western coast of Ireland
- Published: 2 June 2026
- Publisher: Alfred A. Knopf
- Media type: Print, E-book, Audio
- Pages: 400
- ISBN: 9780593320648
- OCLC: 1535594466
- Website: Official website

Land is a 2026 historical novel written by Maggie O'Farrell and was published in June 2026 by Alfred A. Knopf. The narrative follows an Irish family after the devastation that laid waste beginning with the 1840's Great Famine also known as the Irish Potato Famine. The protagonist, an Irish map maker, is commissioned by the British in the aftermath to survey Ireland, taking his family along with him. During his journey, he experiences an epiphany, vowing instead to tell the prehistory and true history of the land.

== Plot summary ==
The novel Land takes place in 1860s Ireland, a decade after the Great Famine. The story follows Tomás, a Famine survivor and Irish mapmaker employed by the British. After a profound experience at an ancient spring, he quits his official job. Tomás decides to create a new, unofficial map that documents the land using the native Irish language and essentially underscores local cultural landmarks, rejecting British colonial perspectives. Tomás moves his family from Dublin to the rural coast. His wife, Phina, is anxious about the loss of his salary and the lack of educational opportunities for their daughters. While the first half of the book focuses on Tomás's mapmaking and historical themes, the second half shifts focus to his children as they grow up and leave Ireland.

His son Liam travels to India as a Jesuit missionary, and his daughter Enda emigrates to Quebec to work as a laborer. The younger children, Rose and Eugene, seemingly rooted to the peninsula -- developing a kinship with the widow who once boarded their da (father).

The novel is based on the very few things the author's family members know about her great-great-grandfather, who worked for the British Ordnance Survey on the second revision of the maps of Ireland just after the Great Famine.

== Themes ==
The metaphor of mapping is germane to this story. O'Farrell uses cartography as a central theme. It shows the differences between the measured and gridded-off land that the British colonizers see and the "dreamed" or "recollected" perspectives of the Irish people. The book contrasts the short and emotional life span of family members with the ancient timeline of the earth. It explores how human dramas play out against a landscape that has existed for millions of years. The book deeply delves into the mechanics and the traumatic effects of empire. It contrasts the British Empire’s systematic control of Ireland—through starvation, land seizure, and erasure of culture, with the native population's struggle to survive and resist. The book also shows the broader reach of imperialism as the characters travel to other colonized spaces like India and Canada.

The trade of land surveying and cartography also serves to explore the father's influence on his children. As an orphan Tomás honed these skills from British and wanted his older son to follow in his vocation, but Liam's personality resists. In contrast, exploration appeals to his older daughter's sense of adventure.

== Reception ==
Land is a New York Times bestseller in the Combined Print & E-Book Fiction category

Harper's Bazaar says that "... O’Farrell’s latest [novel] is another touching meditation on parents, children, and home. Following a father-son duo navigating a homeland they hardly recognize in the years following the Great Famine, this book will make your heart ache for Liam, Tomás, and the land they’re trying desperately to hold onto." According to The New Yorker magazine, the author brings together the factual history of the land and technology with folklore and myth, demonstrating how a great story can resurrect the past and give voice to the marginalized.

The Wall Street Journal says, "As the struggling men and women in 'Land' endure defeat and distrust victory, it is their frailty as much as their strength that wins our sympathy and holds our attention." The Times (UK) says that "It is unequivocally a novel about Ireland, the Irish and the Irish diasporic experience... It is also... her most far-reaching, ambitious novel to date... With 'Land', O’Farrell might snag a Booker nomination, an accolade that has so far (unaccountably, to fans) eluded her."

== See also ==
- British rule in Ireland
- Hamnet by Maggie O'Farrell
