= San Francisco Bay Area Film Critics Circle Awards 2025 =

24th San Francisco Bay Area Film Critics Circle Awards

24th SFBAFCC Awards

December 14, 2025

Best Picture:
One Battle After Another

Best Animated Feature:
KPop Demon Hunters

Best Documentary Feature:
Orwell: 2+2=5

Best International Feature Film:
It Was Just an Accident

The 24th San Francisco Bay Area Film Critics Circle Awards, honoring the best in film for 2025, were given on December 14, 2025. The nominations were announced on December 12, 2025, with Paul Thomas Anderson's action thriller One Battle After Another leading the nominations with eleven, followed by Sinners with nine, Sentimental Value with eight and Hamnet with seven.

One Battle After Another received the most awards with five, including Best Picture and Best Director, followed by Sinners with three. Local publicist Karen Larsen was presented with the Marlon Riggs Award.

== Winners and nominees ==
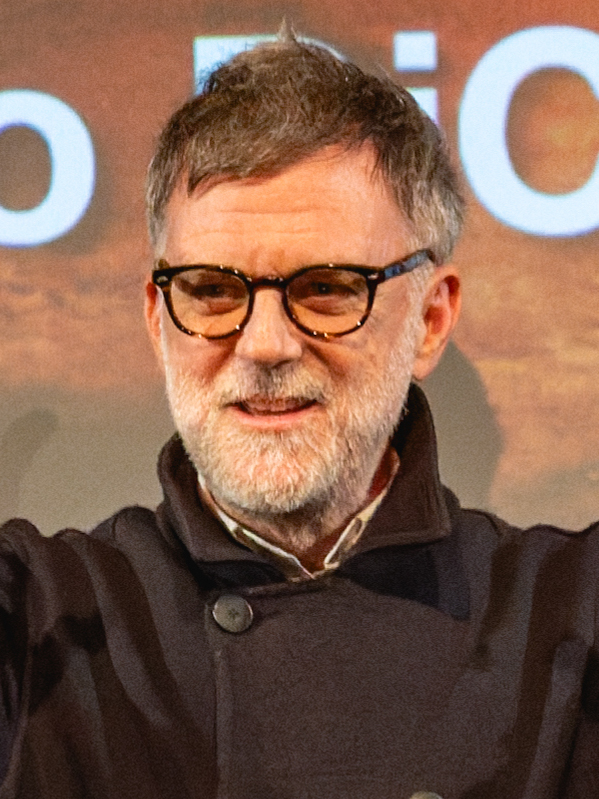
Paul Thomas Anderson, Best Director and Best Adapted Screenplay winner

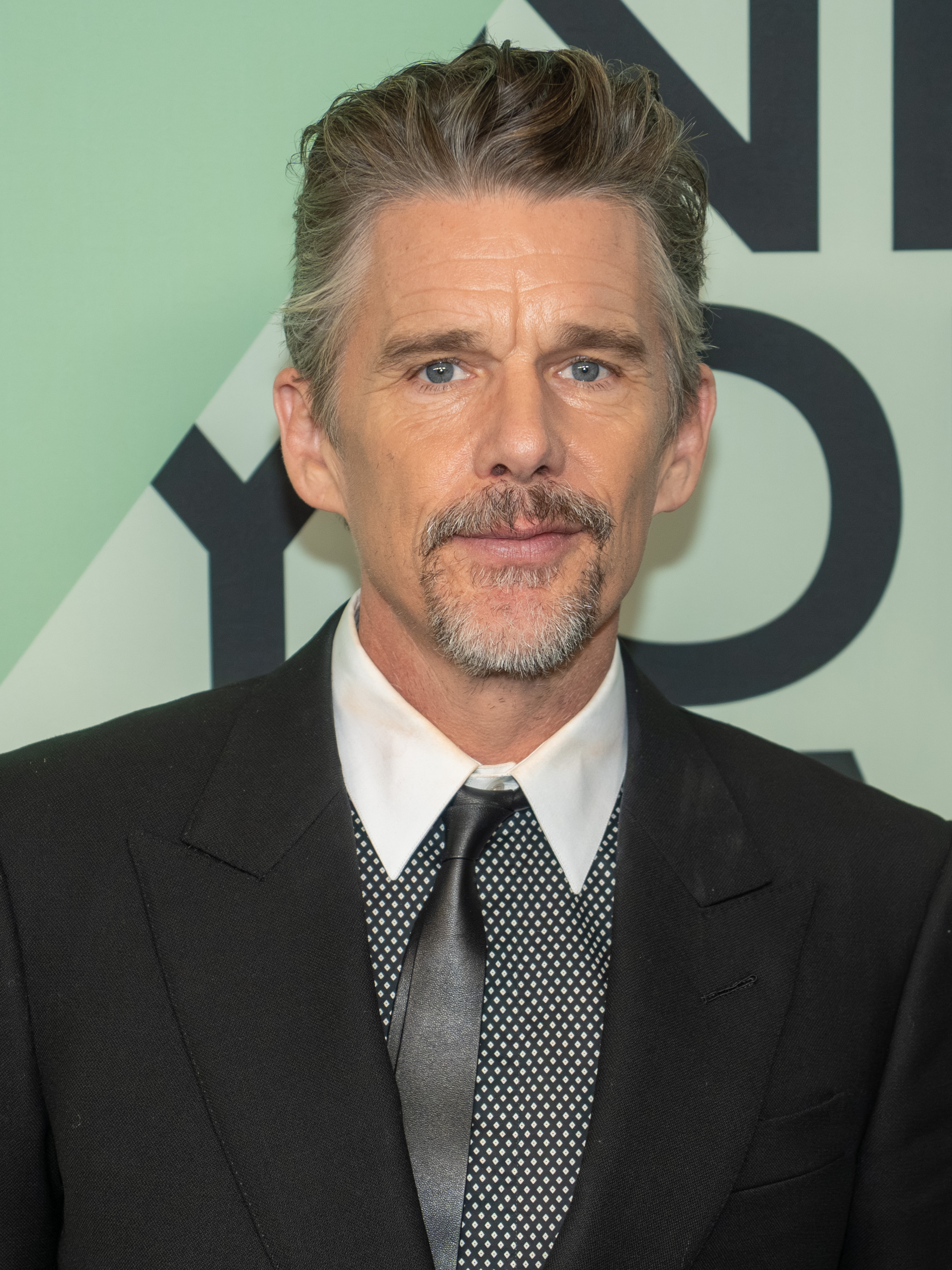
Ethan Hawke, Best Actor winner

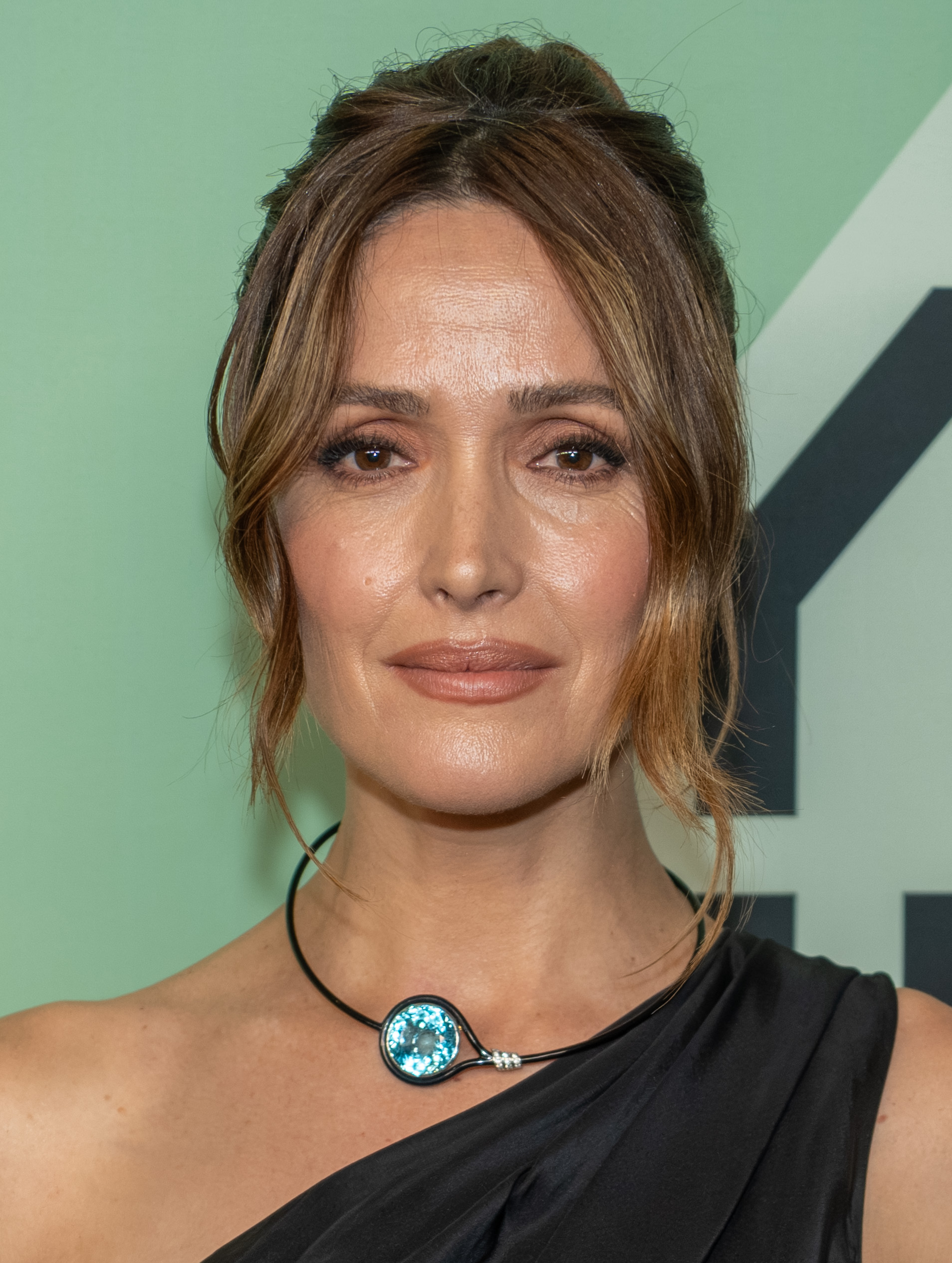
Rose Byrne, Best Actress winner

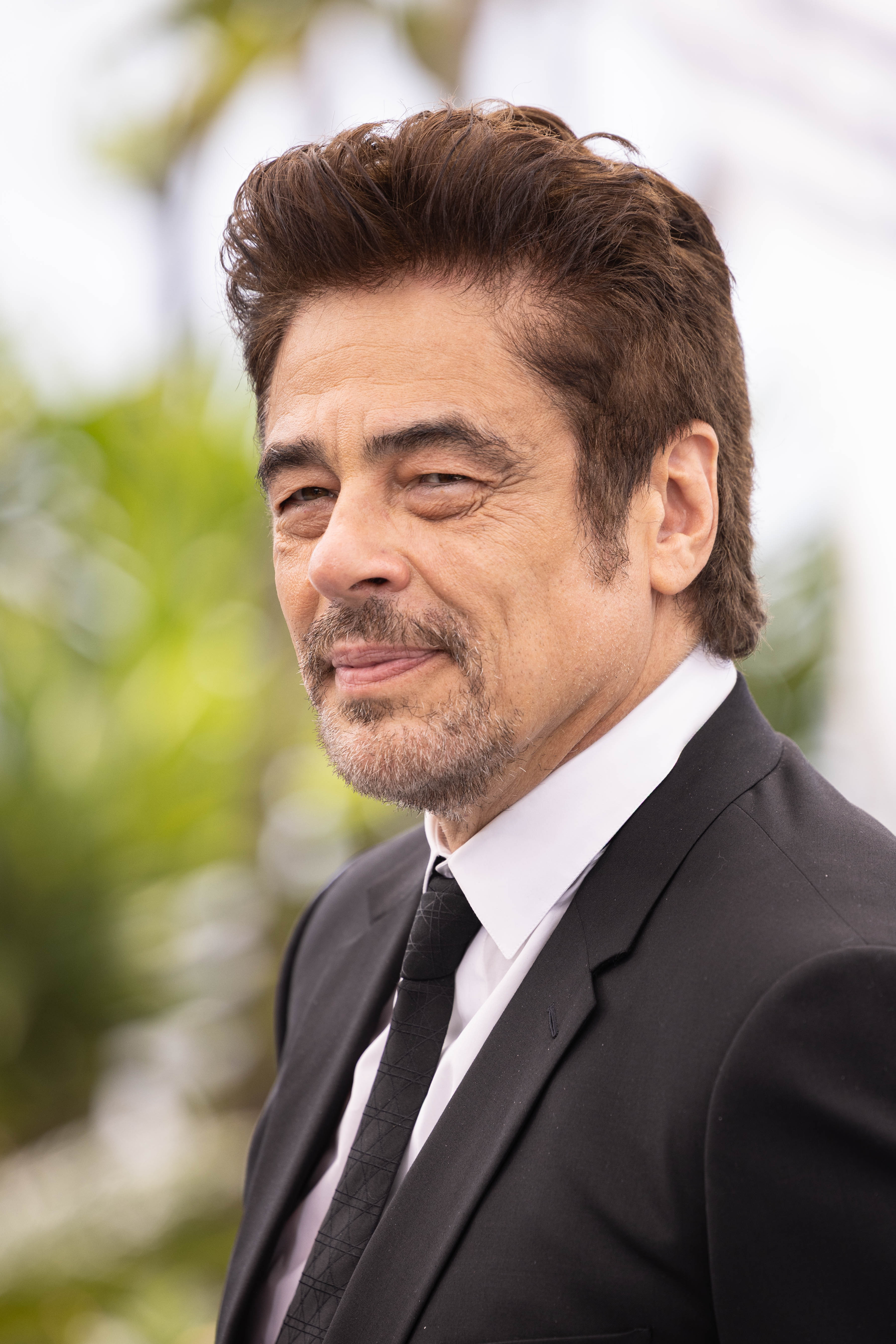
Benicio del Toro, Best Supporting Actor winner

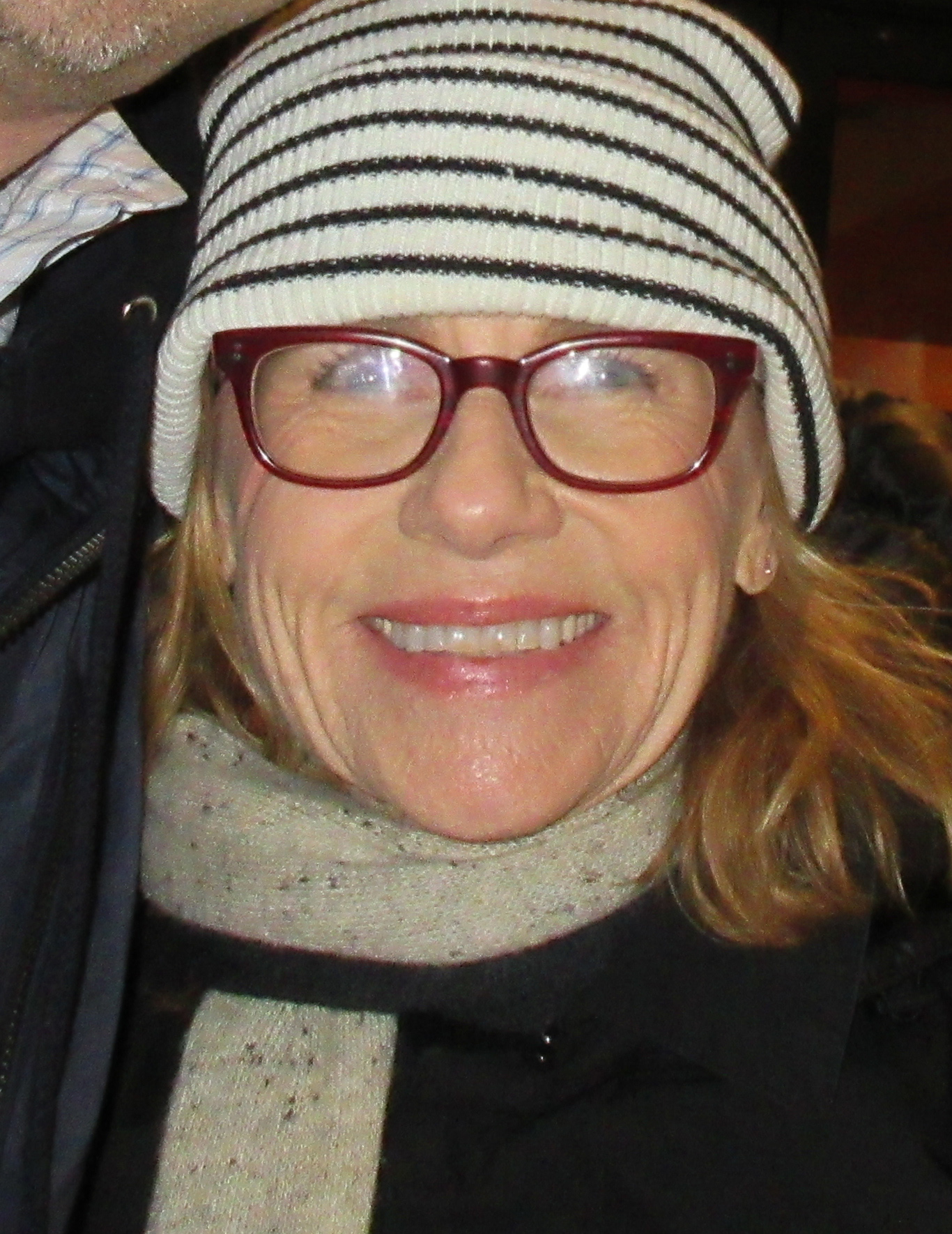
Amy Madigan, Best Supporting Actress winner

These are the nominees for the 24th SFBAFCC Awards. Winners are listed at the top of each list:

Best Picture	Best Director
One Battle After Another; Runner-up: Sinners; Hamnet; Sentimental Value; Train Dreams	Paul Thomas Anderson – One Battle After Another; Runner-up: Ryan Coogler – Sinners; Chloé Zhao – Hamnet; Jafar Panahi – It Was Just an Accident; Joachim Trier – Sentimental Value
Best Actor	Best Actress
Ethan Hawke – Blue Moon as Lorenz Hart; Runner-up: Leonardo DiCaprio – One Battle After Another as Bob Ferguson; Joel Edgerton – Train Dreams as Robert Grainier; Michael B. Jordan – Sinners as Elijah "Smoke" Moore / Elias "Stack" Moore; Wagner Moura – The Secret Agent as Marcelo Alves / Armando Solimões / Fernando Solimões	Rose Byrne – If I Had Legs I'd Kick You as Linda; Runner-up: Jessie Buckley – Hamnet as Agnes Shakespeare; Renate Reinsve – Sentimental Value as Nora Borg; Emma Stone – Bugonia as Michelle Fuller; Eva Victor – Sorry, Baby as Agnes
Best Supporting Actor	Best Supporting Actress
Benicio del Toro – One Battle After Another as Sensei Sergio St. Carlos; Runner-up: Stellan Skarsgård – Sentimental Value as Gustav Borg; Jacob Elordi – Frankenstein as The Creature; Paul Mescal – Hamnet as William Shakespeare; Sean Penn – One Battle After Another as Col. Steven J. Lockjaw	Amy Madigan – Weapons as Gladys; Runner-up: Inga Ibsdotter Lilleaas – Sentimental Value as Agnes Borg Pettersen; Elle Fanning – Sentimental Value as Rachel Kemp; Wunmi Mosaku – Sinners as Annie; Teyana Taylor – One Battle After Another as Perfidia Beverly Hills
Best Original Screenplay	Best Adapted Screenplay
Sentimental Value – Eskil Vogt and Joachim Trier; Runner-up: Sinners – Ryan Coogler; Sorry, Baby – Eva Victor; It Was Just an Accident – Jafar Panahi; Weapons – Zach Cregger	One Battle After Another – Paul Thomas Anderson; Runner-up: Train Dreams – Clint Bentley and Greg Kwedar; Bugonia – Will Tracy; Hamnet – Chloé Zhao and Maggie O'Farrell; No Other Choice – Park Chan-wook, Lee Kyoung-mi, Don McKellar, and Jahye Lee
Best Animated Feature	Best Documentary Feature
KPop Demon Hunters; Runner-up: Zootopia 2; Arco; Elio; Little Amélie or the Character of Rain	Orwell: 2+2=5; Runner-up: The Alabama Solution; Come See Me in the Good Light; The Perfect Neighbor; Riefenstahl
Best International Feature Film	Best Cinematography
It Was Just an Accident • Iran; Runner-up: Sentimental Value • Norway; No Other Choice • South Korea; The Secret Agent • Brazil; Sirāt • Spain	Sinners – Autumn Durald Arkapaw; Runner-up: Train Dreams – Adolpho Veloso; Frankenstein – Dan Laustsen; Hamnet – Łukasz Żal; One Battle After Another – Michael Bauman
Best Film Editing	Best Original Score
One Battle After Another – Andy Jurgensen; Runner-up: Sinners – Michael P. Shawver; F1 – Stephen Mirrione; A House of Dynamite – Kirk Baxter; Marty Supreme – Ronald Bronstein and Josh Safdie	Sinners – Ludwig Göransson; Runner-up: One Battle After Another – Jonny Greenwood; Bugonia – Jerskin Fendrix; Frankenstein – Alexandre Desplat; Train Dreams – Bryce Dessner
Best Production Design
Sinners – Hannah Beachler; Runner-up: Frankenstein – Tamara Deverell; Hamnet – Fiona Crombie; Marty Supreme – Jack Fisk; One Battle After Another – Florencia Martin

== Special awards ==
=== Special Citation for Independent Cinema ===
- Twinless
  - Runner-up: Brother Verses Brother
    - The Encampments
    - Happyend

=== Marlon Riggs Award ===
- Karen Larsen
