= After You've Gone =

After You've Gone may refer to:

== Music ==
- "After You've Gone" (song), a 1918 song written by Turner Layton and Henry Creamer
- After You've Gone, an album by Lenny Solomon
- After You've Gone, a 2004 album by Barre Phillips, Tetsu Saitoh, William Parker, and Joëlle Léandre

== Television and film ==
- After You've Gone (TV series), a 2007–2008 British sitcom
- After You've Gone, 1984 UK film starring Adrian Dunbar
- "After You've Gone", an episode of Jake and the Fatman
- "After You've Gone" (True Detective), a 2014 television episode

== Literature ==
- After You've Gone, a 1989 short-story collection by Alice Adams
- After You've Gone, a 2007 novel by Joan Lingard
- After You've Gone: My Life After Maurie Fields, a 1998 book by Val Jellay

== See also ==
- After You'd Gone
- After You're Gone
