= The Vanishing Act of Esme Lennox =

2006 novel by Maggie O'Farrell

- First edition
- Author: Maggie O'Farrell
- Language: English
- Publisher: Headline Review
- Publication date: 2006
- ISBN: 978-0-75530-843-9

The Vanishing Act of Esme Lennox is a novel by Northern Irish author Maggie O'Farrell, published in 2006 by Headline Review, concerning three generations of a Scottish family.

== Plot ==
Euphemia Esme Lennox was brought up as a child in India with her elder sister Kathleen (Kitty), but following the death of her baby brother Hugo the family moved to Edinburgh. The plot then shifts to the present day: Iris discovers that she has a great-aunt in a psychiatric unit, who has been there for some sixty years. Iris never knew about her great-aunt, as her grandmother Kathleen suffering from Alzheimer's, has never revealed that she had a sister. The narrative shifts between Esme's childhood in the 1930s and the present day as Iris tries to discover the truth about what happened to Esme. It is eventually revealed that Esme is in fact Iris's grandmother, becoming pregnant as a result of rape, and due to her incarceration in the asylum the baby was adopted by Kitty.

== Reception ==
- Jane Gardam writing in The Guardian praises the novel: 'a short book about a long life has the dream-like intensity of imagination and the gift of conveying pain, fear and sometimes rapture for which O'Farrell is known. The prose is spare, yet the Edwardian world it describes crosses two continents and is rich and clear as stained glass. It moves with ease between the mimosa trees of an Indian childhood and the iron-grey seas of Fife in old age. She can make the economical style seem slow, ruminative and rather old-fashioned ("Let us begin with two girls at a dance"), yet except when the host of minor characters occasionally becomes confusing, the story never flags. And it is a story so historically important that one ceases to think of "style" and "the novel" altogether.' and she concludes that 'Beneath the cool Edwardian detail of this elegantly written book lie the horrors of a Gothic novel. Scottish propriety conceals rape and murder, torture, hypocrisy and violent sex. The comfort is that the lunacy laws are now reformed and the small, bewildered orphans of the raj are no more.'
- Kirkus Reviews is generally positive: 'At times, these competing voices, each with a different take on exactly what happened, can be confusing, but by the novel's surprising ending, each has become clear. Despite occasional opacity, this slow-building, impressionistic work amply rewards dedicated readers with a moving human drama.'
- Julia Scheeres from the New York Times writes 'Maggie O’Farrell takes the notion of the loony relative and turns it on its head. What if, against all the odds, the apparently batty aunt might actually be normal and everybody else seems to be nuts?...O’Farrell is a very visual writer, creating dead-on images like the “arched pink rafters” of a dog's mouth and a chandelier's “points of light kaleidoscoping” above a dance floor. This talent serves her well at the novel's startling and darkly rewarding finale. Suffice it to say, sometimes revenge is much more therapeutic than forgiveness.'
- Lesley Mcdowell ends her review in The Independent with 'This triple-hander between Esme, Kitty and Iris's narratives could have become messy and confusing, but O'Farrell never relinquishes control, and her presentation of Kitty's voice, even more confused and fractured than that of Esme's, is a triumph. O'Farrell plays a delicious game between the two sisters, challenging her readers to decide just who is more sane than the other. It is almost too delicious at times: Esme and Kitty's stories are so fascinating that Iris is occasionally poor competition for them. But Iris is there to help fill in the blanks, and that's exactly what this story is: an attempt to fill in those gaps and silences, the holes in a person's life, especially when that person is a woman locked up, forgotten about and ultimately silenced. It is also an exercise in narrative control that works beautifully, and sees O'Farrell raising her game considerably.'
- Ron Charles from the Houston Chronicle explains 'At the heart of this fantastic new novel is a mystery you want to solve until you start to suspect the truth, and then you read on in a panic, horrified that you may be right. The structure of the novel is a challenge, more like a dare, the kind of purposefully scrambled puzzle that makes you wonder if it's all just too much work to figure out who's talking and when this happened and what that means. But forge on: O'Farrell isn't merely showing off; she's forcing us to participate in a family's ghastly conspiracy of forgetting...In O'Farrell's fierce, engrossing novel, the crimes of the past rear up with surprising vengeance. Esme Lennox won't vanish again anytime soon.'
