= Before (TV series) =

- Genre: Drama; Psychological thriller; Supernatural horror
- Created by: Sarah Thorp
- Showrunner: Sarah Thorp
- Starring: Billy Crystal; Jacobi Jupe; Maria Dizzia; Ava Lalezarzadeh; Rosie Perez; Judith Light
- Composer: Jay Wadley
- Country of origin: United States
- Original language: English
- No. of episodes: 10

Production
- Executive producers: Billy Crystal; Adam Bernstein; Eric Roth; Sarah Thorp; Jet Wilkinson
- Running time: 28-35 minutes
- Production companies: Jennilind Productions; My Name Is Cavale; Vanessa Productions; Paramount Television Studios

Original release
- Network: Apple TV+
- Release: October 25 – December 20, 2024

Before is an American psychological thriller television miniseries created by Sarah Thorp, who also serves as showrunner and is an executive producer, along with Billy Crystal, Adam Bernstein, Eric Roth, and Jet Wilkinson. It stars Billy Crystal as a child psychiatrist, and features Judith Light, Rosie Perez, and Jacobi Jupe.

Before premiered on October 25, 2024, on Apple TV+.

== Premise ==
A recently widowed child psychiatrist named Eli meets with his next patient, Noah, who mysteriously shows up at his house and appears to know things about him. The child appears to have psychotic episodes that result in harm to himself or others, but the psychiatrist senses something in these episodes that appear to point to a "source" which the psychiatrist appears to relate to.

== Cast ==
=== Main ===
- Billy Crystal as Eli
- Jacobi Jupe as Noah
- Maria Dizzia as Barbara
- Ava Lalezarzadeh as Cleo
- Rosie Perez as Denise
- Judith Light as Lynn

=== Recurring ===
- Sakina Jaffrey as Gail
- Robert Townsend as Jackson
- Miriam Shor as Sue Ann
- Rebecca Ruane as Sophie
- Hope Davis as Dr. Jane

=== Guest ===
- Julia Chan as Therapist
- Itzhak Perlman as Drake
- Delia Cunningham as Shift Nurse
- Barbara Bain as Ruth
- Will Hochman as Benjamin Walker
- Jennifer Esposito as Psychic
- Lenny Venito as Lawrence
- Stephen Wallem as Charlie
- Kineta Kunutu as Doctor

== Episodes ==
No.	Title	Directed by	Written by	Original release date
1	"The Imposter"	Adam Bernstein	Sarah Thorp	October 25, 2024
2	"The Scientist"	Jet Wilkinson	Sarah Thorp	October 25, 2024
3	"The Liar"	Jet Wilkinson	Sarah Thorp	November 1, 2024
4	"Symbols and Signs"	David Petrarca	Sarah Thorp	November 8, 2024
5	"Folie à Deux"	David Petrarca	Emmy Grinwis	November 15, 2024
6	"Fever Dream"	Emmanuel Osei-Kuffour	Desta Tedros Reff	November 22, 2024
7	"The Power of Belief"	Emmanuel Osei-Kuffour	Howie Miller	November 27, 2024
8	"When We Dead Awaken"	Jet Wilkinson	Joseph Sousa	December 6, 2024
9	"And the Darkness Was Called Night"	Zetna Fuentes	Joseph Sousa & Audrey Rosenberg	December 13, 2024
10	"Before"	Jet Wilkinson	Sarah Thorp	December 20, 2024

== Production ==
It was announced in June 2022 that Apple TV+ had ordered the series, which Billy Crystal would star in and Barry Levinson would direct. In December 2023, Judith Light joined the cast, with Adam Bernstein now set to direct the pilot episode, as Levinson had to exit the project. In January 2024, Rosie Perez, Jacobi Jupe, Maria Dizzia, Ava Lalezarzadeh would be added to the main cast, with Hope Davis joining in a recurring capacity.

Filming had begun on the series under the name Winston in New Jersey by May 2023. In June, it was announced it had entered an indefinite hiatus amidst the 2023 Writers Guild of America strike. Upon the strike's conclusion, the series resumed filming in December in Moonachie, New Jersey. It filmed in Hoboken, New Jersey, in January 2024, and later in Independence Township, New Jersey in March. The series used de-aging technology from the artificial intelligence studio, Deep Voodoo.

== Reception ==
The review aggregator website Rotten Tomatoes reported a 32% approval rating with an average rating of 5.2/10, based on 31 critic reviews. The website's critics consensus reads, "Starring Billy Crystal playing against type, Before initially intrigues but doesn't bring enough ideas or variety to sustain what comes after." Metacritic, which uses a weighted average, assigned a score of 46 out of 100 based on 20 critics, indicating "mixed or average" reviews.

== See also ==
- Bridey Murphy
