= The Hand That First Held Mine =

2010 novel by Maggie O'Farrell

The Hand that First Held Mine
- Author: Maggie O'Farrell
- Language: English
- Genre: Novel
- Publisher: Headline Review
- Publication date: 2010
- Publication place: United Kingdom
- Media type: Print (Hardcover & Paperback)
- Pages: 341 pp.

The Hand that First Held Mine is a novel by Northern Irish author Maggie O'Farrell, published in 2010 by Headline Review.

The book is a work of literary fiction that juxtaposes two seemingly unrelated narratives: one set in 1950s London, following an ambitious young woman named Lexie Sinclair who moves from rural Devon to the postwar Soho art scene, and another in the present day, centered around Elina Vilkuna, an artist coping with the challenges of new motherhood. Through alternating chapters, O'Farrell explores themes such as love, memory, identity, and the transformative nature of motherhood. The connection between the two women's lives gradually unfolds as the novel progresses, culminating in a revelation that links them across generations.

In the context of O'Farrell's work, the novel is noted for its exploration of emotional and psychological depth, focusing on memory and identity. It contributed to O'Farrell's reputation as a novelist skilled at blending intimate personal stories with broader thematic concerns.

The book was well received by critics and won the Costa Book Award for Novel in 2010.

== Plot summary ==
The novel alternates between two primary storylines. The first follows Lexie Sinclair, a recent graduate described as rebellious and bored, who leaves her rural home for London in the 1950s. There, she becomes involved in the city's art scene and develops a relationship with magazine editor Innes Kent, 13 years her senior. Lexie's journey explores self-discovery as she navigates professional and personal life at a time when women's independence was influenced by societal norms.

In contrast, the contemporary storyline revolves around Elina Vilkuna, a Finnish-Swedish artist living in modern-day London. After a difficult birth involving a Caesarian section, Elina experiences memory loss and struggles to adjust to motherhood. Her partner Ted, a film editor, also grapples with childhood memories that become more vivid as Elina and Ted's lives are revealed to have ties to Lexie's narrative.

Lexie and Innes move in together. Innes is still married to his estranged wife, Gloria, with whom he has a daughter, Margo. Innes dies suddenly from pneumonia and Lexie has a relationship with Felix, and they have a son, Theo. Following a sudden tragedy, Lexie dies. Margo, unable to have her own children, takes Theo in and raises him as her own, concealing his true parentage. This hidden past affects Theo, who is later revealed to be Ted, experiencing repressed memories of his early life. This emotional trauma resurfaces in the contemporary narrative, contributing to Ted's turmoil as he navigates life with Elina and their newborn child. As Elina recovers from postpartum depression, Ted begins to struggle emotionally.

Elina learns about Lexie's past, which helps her understand Ted's emotional difficulties and her own connection to his history. This understanding allows her to process her own experiences with motherhood. The novel concludes with a sense of hopeful connection. Elina, Ted, and their baby form a new family unit, while also carrying the weight of the past. Acknowledging their intertwined stories aids in healing and allows them to move forward. The emotional burden of their histories begins to lessen as they confront their truths together. Elina embraces her role as a mother, and Ted begins to reconcile aspects of his identity previously hidden from him.

== Release history ==
The Hand That First Held Mine was first published in April 2010 by Headline Publishing Group in the United Kingdom. The book was later released in other markets, including the United States, where it was published by Houghton Mifflin Harcourt. The novel was available in hardcover, paperback, and ebook formats after its initial release. It has since been reprinted and translated into multiple languages, gaining an international readership.

== Theme ==
A central theme of the novel is motherhood and its effect on one's perception of the world. The link between the two timelines is revealed later in the novel.

== Critical ==
The novel received positive critical acclaim for its character development and narrative structure. Critics praised O'Farrell's handling of emotional complexity within a compelling plot. The interweaving of the two storylines, separated by decades but linked by a revelation, was noted as a key strength.

Reviewers, including Day for The Guardian, commented positively on O'Farrell's narrative techniques. "At several points, the narrator steps back from the action, observing the characters from afar," Day wrote. "In the hands of a lesser writer, this technique would be jarring but O'Farrell possesses such a lyrical touch that the passages work with seamless clarity."

While motherhood and postpartum issues are significant topics, some critics highlighted the focus on Ted's struggles: "This novel tears down the walls between the generations, and in an inspired upending of literary convention, places a father's post-natal ravings centre-stage."

Many reviewers found O'Farrell's portrayal of motherhood affecting , describing it as both transformative and overwhelming. Elina's postpartum struggles were noted for their authenticity. Crown, writing for The Guardian, commented that O'Farrell had surpassed the standard set by her previous work. Compared to Esme, she "returns to the domestic sphere of her earlier novels, but with a meatier, more complex agenda." Crown stated that instead of focusing on relationships, this novel tackled "motherhood's bumpy terrain: through her candid depictions of its darknesses and pleasures, she delivers a novel which is just as disturbing, and possibly more potent still, than her last."

However, there was some variation in the reception of the two plot lines. While "O'Farrell is an accomplished storyteller who keeps us guessing until the end... one narrative proves more compelling than the other." Hagestadt of The Independent explained that "the dynamics of [Ted and Elina's] slightly chilly relationship remain a mystery."

== Awards ==
The Hand That First Held Mine was nominated for or won multiple literary awards. It received the 2010 Costa Book Award for Novel. Upon releasing their shortlist, the judges described it as "a powerful story full of dynamic characters, crafted with panache and lyricism." They justified their selection of the winner by stating it is "a book of grand themes and intimate moments. This gripping novel is the one we'd unreservedly recommend."

It was longlisted for the 2012 International Dublin Literary Award, one of 147 titles. It was nominated by Tweebronnen Openbare Bibliotheek (Belgium), London's Public Libraries (UK), and Dunedin Public Libraries (New Zealand).
