= Hamnet (film) =

2025 film by Chloé Zhao

- Theatrical release poster
- Directed by: Chloé Zhao
- Screenplay by: Chloé Zhao; Maggie O'Farrell
- Based on: Hamnet by Maggie O'Farrell
- Produced by: Liza Marshall; Pippa Harris; Nicolas Gonda; Steven Spielberg; Sam Mendes
- Starring: Jessie Buckley; Paul Mescal; Jacobi Jupe; Emily Watson; Joe Alwyn; Noah Jupe
- Cinematography: Łukasz Żal
- Edited by: Chloé Zhao; Affonso Gonçalves
- Music by: Max Richter
- Production companies: Hera Pictures; Neal Street Productions; Amblin Entertainment; Book of Shadows
- Distributed by: Focus Features (United States); Universal Pictures (International)
- Release dates: 29 August 2025 (Telluride); 26 November 2025 (United States); 9 January 2026 (United Kingdom)
- Running time: 126 minutes
- Countries: United Kingdom; United States
- Language: English
- Budget: $30–35 million
- Box office: $109 million

Hamnet is a 2025 historical drama film directed by Chloé Zhao, who co-wrote the screenplay with Maggie O'Farrell, based on the 2020 novel by O'Farrell. The film dramatises the family life of William Shakespeare and his wife Agnes Hathaway (Note: Anne Hathaway's name is Agnes Hathaway in the novel and film. In her father's will, her first name was listed as Agnes.) as they cope with the death of their 11-year-old son Hamnet. It stars Jessie Buckley and Paul Mescal as Agnes and William, alongside Emily Watson, Joe Alwyn, and Jacobi Jupe in supporting roles.

Hamnet had its world premiere at the 52nd Telluride Film Festival on 29 August 2025 and received a limited theatrical release by Focus Features in the United States and Canada on 26 November. It received a wide theatrical release on 5 December and was released by Universal Pictures in the United Kingdom on 9 January 2026. Critical reception was positive, with Buckley's performance receiving particular praise. The film received numerous accolades, including winning the Best Motion Picture – Drama and Best Actress in a Motion Picture – Drama for Buckley at the 83rd Golden Globe Awards, and eight nominations at the 98th Academy Awards, including Best Picture, Best Director for Zhao, with Buckley winning the Academy Award for Best Actress.

== Plot ==
A written prologue states that in Stratford-upon-Avon, England, "Hamnet" and "Hamlet" were considered the same name.

William Shakespeare works as a tutor to pay off his family's debt. He leaves his students after seeing a mysterious Agnes summon a hawk with her falconry glove, and they share a moment. William's mother, Mary, warns him of rumours that Agnes is the daughter of a forest witch who taught her herbal lore, which Agnes later uses to treat a cut on William's forehead. She asks him for a story, and he recounts the legend of Orpheus and Eurydice, delighting her. Agnes reads William's palm, foretelling a successful future for him, and two children at her deathbed. The pair consummate their relationship, impregnating Agnes, leading her family to disown her and forcing her to move in with the Shakespeares. The pair hurriedly marry, and Agnes gives birth to Susanna in the woods.

William retaliates when his father, John, beats him for rejecting manual labour. Seeing William's frustration with writing, Agnes suggests to her brother Bartholomew to send him to London, leaving her and Susanna in Stratford. Later, a pregnant Agnes tries to go outside to give birth, but William's family tells her the river has flooded and keep her in the house, where she gives birth to twins Hamnet and Judith, the latter seemingly stillborn. Remembering being kept from her mother's deathbed as a child, Agnes demands to hold the baby despite superstition. Judith awakes, and Agnes promises to protect her. Years later, a now-successful William returns home intermittently while the children grow up very close. As they bury Agnes's hawk, she tells the children to make a wish to the hawk's spirit, who she says will carry them in its heart. William leaves for London again and tells a distraught Hamnet to look out for the family; Agnes reassures him by foretelling that he will join his father's theatre company in a swordfighting role.

William wanders the streets of London during an outbreak of bubonic plague and watches a puppet show depicting the plague carrying people off to death. In Stratford, Judith contracts plague. As the family treat her, Hamnet lies beside her and evokes the tale of the hawk to encourage her, proclaiming he wants to take her place to trick death. Judith recovers, but Hamnet falls gravely ill and dies; on his deathbed, he envisions himself on a stage calling for his mother and makes a wish to the hawk. William rushes home and is distraught to find Hamnet dead, and his absence strains his marriage to Agnes as they cope with Hamnet's death. William buys the largest house in Stratford and departs for London again, and a distraught Agnes holds his hand and says she now sees nothing. William rehearses his new play Hamlet in London, but is frustrated with his cast's flat delivery. In despair, he leans over the edge of a jetty on the River Thames and recites his "To be, or not to be" soliloquy from the play.

Agnes's stepmother Joan shows her a playbill for a production of Hamlet in London and upbraids her for marrying William, but Agnes rebukes her. Agnes and Bartholomew travel to London to see William. Finding him absent from home, they attend the first performance of Hamlet at the Globe Theatre. Agnes is initially offended, thinking her son's name is being profaned. However, upon seeing William as the ghost of Hamlet's father, she realizes the play is a tribute to Hamnet, and is moved to tears by the scene between Hamlet and his father. Backstage, William, having noticed Agnes, breaks down crying while listening to the play, and returns to see Agnes from the wings. The play progresses as Hamlet engages Laertes in final combat, fulfilling Hamnet's dream for the role. As Hamlet dies, Agnes reaches for the actor's hand as she had held William's when they first met, and the rest of the audience reaches toward him in turn. As Agnes and William share a reconciliatory glance, they see Hamnet's spirit on the stage, as seen earlier in his dying vision. He moves from sadness to a smile before disappearing backstage through a hole resembling the forest cave. For the first time since Hamnet's death, Agnes laughs and smiles.

== Cast ==
- Jessie Buckley as Agnes, William's wife
  - Faith Delaney as young Agnes
- Paul Mescal as William Shakespeare, Agnes's husband
- Emily Watson as Mary Shakespeare, William's mother
- Joe Alwyn as Bartholomew Hathaway, Agnes' younger brother
  - Smylie Bradwell as young Bartholomew
- Jacobi Jupe as Hamnet Shakespeare, William and Agnes's son, and Judith's twin
- Olivia Lynes as Judith Shakespeare, William and Agnes's younger daughter, and Hamnet's twin
- Justine Mitchell as Joan Hathaway, Agnes's stepmother
- David Wilmot as John Shakespeare, William's father
- Bodhi Rae Breathnach as Susanna Shakespeare, William and Agnes's older daughter
- Freya Hannan-Mills as Eliza Shakespeare, William's sister (based on Joan) (Note: Shakespeare had two sisters named Joan, though the first died in infancy, and the name was re-used.)
- James Skinner as Gilbert Shakespeare, William's younger brother
- Elliot Baxter as Richard Shakespeare, William's younger brother
- Dainton Anderson as Edmond Shakespeare, William's youngest brother
- Louisa Harland as Rowan Hathaway, Agnes's mother
- Noah Jupe as the actor who plays Hamlet in Hamlet
- Raphael Goold as the actor who plays Horatio in Hamlet
- Shaun Mason as the actor who plays Claudius in Hamlet
- Matthew Tennyson as the actor who plays Gertrude in Hamlet
- El Simons as the actor who plays Ophelia in Hamlet
- Clay Milner Russell as the actor who plays Laertes in Hamlet
- Sam Woolf as the actor who plays Bernardo in Hamlet
- Hera Gibson as the actor who plays Francisco in Hamlet
- Jack Shalloo as the actor who plays Marcellus in Hamlet
- Javier Marzan as the actor who plays The Fool
- Zac Wishart as Joan's older son, Agnes' stepbrother
- James Lintern as Joan's younger son, Agnes' stepbrother
- Eva Wishart as Joan's older daughter, Agnes' stepsister
- Effie Linnen as Joan's younger daughter, Agnes' stepsister
- Laura Guest as a midwife
- John Mackay as a Edward Woolmer, the local priest
- Albert McCormick as Boy in window
- Eliah Arnstjerna as Drum player
- Edward Anderson as Flute player

== Production ==
A stage production of Maggie O'Farrell's novel was announced in November 2022, with the film rights having been acquired prior to publication by London-based Liza Marshall and her company Hera Pictures, who then partnered with Neal Street Productions. In April 2023, Chloé Zhao was hired to direct the film, and would write the screenplay alongside O'Farrell.

In May 2023, Paul Mescal and Jessie Buckley entered negotiations to star in the film. Mescal confirmed in a January 2024 interview that he and Buckley would star.

Principal photography was originally scheduled to begin in London on 3 June 2024. Production instead began in Wales on 29 July 2024, and wrapped on 30 September. While most of the film was shot in Herefordshire, England, including the village of Weobley, scenes were also filmed in London at the Charterhouse, which served as the largest London location for the production. The scenes set at the Globe Theatre were shot at a replica of the building constructed by production designer Fiona Crombie at Elstree Studios backlot, rather than at Shakespeare's Globe (which Zhao and Crombie felt was too ornate for the film). Joe Alwyn and Emily Watson were added to the cast in August, and Steven Spielberg joined the film as a producer. Łukasz Żal was the cinematographer and Max Richter the film's composer, whose 2004 track "On the Nature of Daylight" is also used in the film.

Music was integral to the production from start to finish with Richter having composed 30 minutes of original music to be used during filming. This music was used by Zhao on set to establish the tone of the film for the actors and crew before Richter worked on the official composition in post-production. Jessie Buckley shared Richter's 2004 track "On the Nature of Daylight" with Zhao during filming, which inspired Zhao to reframe the original ending. "The director played it on set, on a loop over and over, throughout the three days they shot the final sequence of the film, building it into the foundation of Agnes’s reach through time and the veil of death". By the time Richter shared his original composition for the ending with Zhao, she had already committed to "On the Nature of Daylight" for the ending, with the original composition now being used during the credits.

== Literary references ==
In addition to adapting O'Farrell's book, the film repeatedly quotes from the Old English Nine Herbs Charm, an alliterative spell (galdor) from Anglo-Saxon England. The film quotes from two translations of the text: one from philologist Joseph S. Hopkins and another from Stephen Pollington. Regarding the use of his translation in the film, Hopkins says "It is a great joy to play a role in presenting the Nine Plants Spell to such a large audience in the contemporary period, surely providing the most exposure the spell has received since Anglo-Saxon England".

== Release ==
Focus Features acquired worldwide rights to Hamnet in August 2024, with its parent company Universal Pictures handling its international distribution; Indian distribution rights were acquired by Reliance Entertainment in December 2025 under a pre-existing output deal with Amblin Entertainment. It had its world premiere at the 52nd Telluride Film Festival on 29 August 2025. In July 2025, the film was announced as part of the Gala Presentations lineup of the 50th 2025 Toronto International Film Festival, where it won the prestigious People's Choice Award. It was screened in the non-competitive section 'Grand public' of the 20th Rome Film Festival in October 2025 before its theatrical release, in the official selection of the 70th Valladolid International Film Festival on 27 October 2025 (for its Spanish premiere), and closed the 38th Tokyo International Film Festival on 5 November 2025.

The film received a limited theatrical release in the United States on 26 November 2025, ahead of a wide release one week later on 5 December 2025. It would later be released in the United Kingdom on 9 January 2026, and in Australia on 15 January. As of 24 January 2026, screening expanded to a total of 1,276 theatres and ranked #10 at the box office with $1.8 million for a domestic total approaching $18 million.

=== Home media ===
Hamnet was released for streaming, and was then made available on DVD, Blu-ray and Ultra HD Blu-ray for home viewing on 3 March 2026.

== Reception ==
=== Critical response ===
On the review aggregator website Rotten Tomatoes, 86% of 352 critics' reviews are positive, with an average rating of 8.3/10. The website's consensus reads: "Breaking hearts and mending them in one fell swoop, Hamnet speculates on the inspiration behind Shakespeare's masterpiece with palpable emotional force thanks to Jessie Buckley and Paul Mescal's astonishing performances." Metacritic, which uses a weighted average, assigned the film a score of 84 out of 100, based on 54 critics, indicating "universal acclaim".

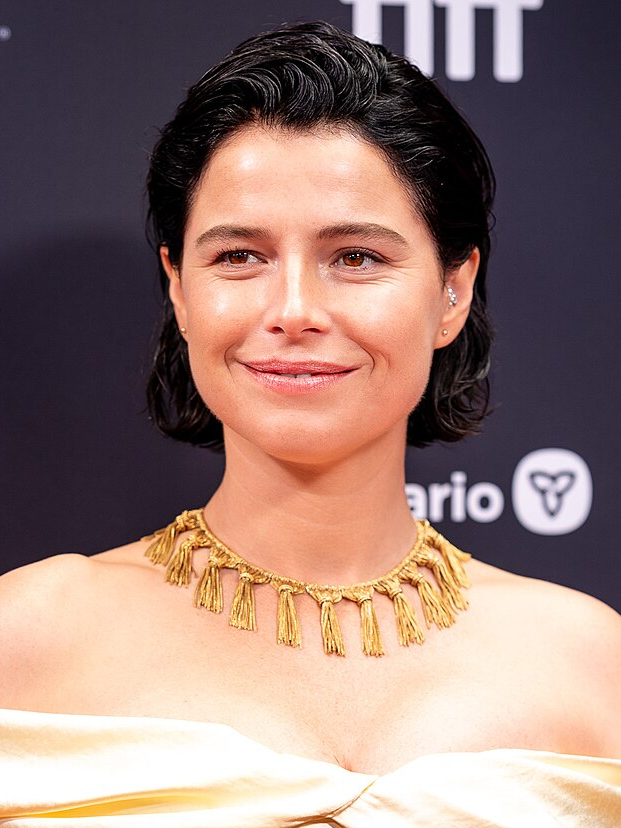
Buckley's performance as Agnes received widespread acclaim from critics, which earned her the Academy Award for Best Actress.

Buckley's performance in particular was widely praised. David Fear of Rolling Stone opined that people "will be talking about Jessie Buckley's performance for years". Screen Daily's Tim Grierson thought Mescal's role was similar to his previous work but "the regularly superb Buckley is revelatory as a wild creature who experiences the exhilaration of motherhood as well as the heartbreak of loss." Johnny Oleksinski at the New York Post wrote, "It's Buckley who's giving one of those rare turns that simply beggars belief. She swings back and forth from cast iron to porcelain. The actress is thunderous, playful, grounded and ethereal." Peter Debruge of Variety declared the film to be "so emotionally raw as to be almost excruciating at times" "featuring a heroic performance from Jessie Buckley".

Bilge Ebiri of Vulture described Hamnet as "devastating, maybe the most emotionally shattering movie I've seen in years". Angie Han of The Hollywood Reporter summed the film in the bottom line as "a tremendously acted heartbreaker". Pete Hammond of Deadline Hollywood wrote that Hamnet, "with its quiet determination to say much about how art is affected by life, is unlike anything else". David Ehrlich of IndieWire affirms that with Hamnet, "It would be hard to imagine a more fitting tribute to Shakespeare's most widely interpreted play." On the performances, Ehrlich notes that the character of Agnes is not built on tropes but is "anchored by the primordial rawness of Buckley's astonishing performance." He found Mescal's performance to be "cathartically transcendent, because it at last rewards that search... as Will starts looking for his son in the space between life and death."

Richard Lawson in The Guardian gave it four stars, calling it a "poignant adaptation of Maggie O'Farrell's 2020 novel with a stirring tearjerker ending". BBC film critics Nicholas Barber and Caryn James deemed the movie to be the best of 2025 thanks to its rich and emotionally touching characters, its themes and its imagery. On the contrary, The Wall Street Journal's Kyle Smith called it a "quintessential Oscar bait (highbrow foundation; maximal crying and emoting) but is dogged by intellectual anachronism."

=== Accolades ===
Hamnet received an assortment of awards and nominations, notably for the direction, performances, screenplay, score, cinematography, costumes, and production design.

The film won the People's Choice Award upon its premiere at the 2025 Toronto International Film Festival. It was subsequently nominated for eight awards at the 98th Academy Awards (winning one), six at the 83rd Golden Globe Awards (winning two, including for Best Motion Picture – Drama), eleven at the 79th British Academy Film Awards (winning two, including for Outstanding British Film), and eleven at the 31st Critics' Choice Awards. For her role in the film, Buckley won the Golden Globe Award for Best Actress in a Motion Picture – Drama, the Critics' Choice Movie Award for Best Actress,, the Actor Award for Outstanding Performance by a Female Actor in a Leading Role, the BAFTA Award for Best Actress in a Leading Role, and the Academy Award for Best Actress. It was selected as one of the top 10 films of 2025 by the American Film Institute.

== See also ==
- List of William Shakespeare screen adaptations
