= San Francisco Bay Area Film Critics Circle Award for Best Supporting Actor =

Annual US film award

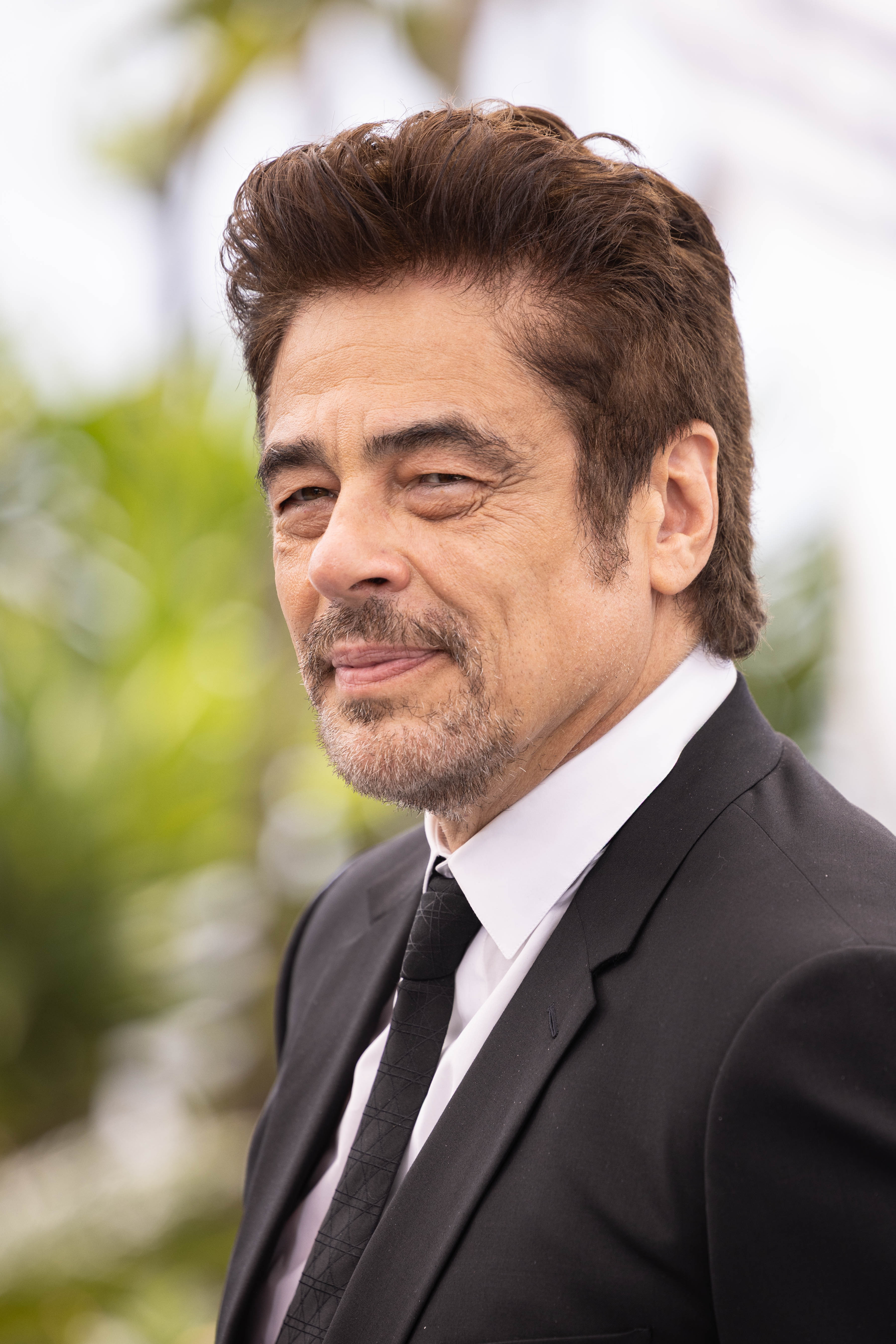
- The 2025 recipient: Benicio del Toro
- Awarded for: Best Performance by an Actor in a Supporting Role
- Country: United States
- Presented by: San Francisco Bay Area Film Critics Circle
- First award: Chris Cooper; Adaptation (2002)
- Currently held by: Benicio del Toro; One Battle After Another (2025)
- Website: sfbafcc.com

The San Francisco Bay Area Film Critics Circle Award for Best Supporting Actor is an award given by the San Francisco Bay Area Film Critics Circle to honor an actor who has delivered an outstanding performance in a supporting role.

== Winners ==
=== 2000s ===
| Year | Winner | Film | Role |
|---|---|---|---|
| 2002 | Chris Cooper | Adaptation. | John Laroche |
| 2003 | Peter Sarsgaard | Shattered Glass | Charles Lane |
| 2004 | Thomas Haden Church | Sideways | Jack Lopate |
| 2005 | Kevin Costner | The Upside of Anger | Denny Davies |
| 2006 | Jackie Earle Haley | Little Children | Ronald James McGorvey |
| 2007 | Casey Affleck | The Assassination of Jesse James... | Robert Ford |
| 2008 | Heath Ledger posthumously | The Dark Knight | The Joker |
| 2009 | Christian McKay | Me and Orson Welles | Orson Welles |

=== 2010s and 2020s ===
| Year | Winner | Film | Role |
|---|---|---|---|
| 2010 | John Hawkes | Winter's Bone | Teardrop Dolly |
| 2011 | Albert Brooks | Drive | Bernie Rose |
| 2012 | Tommy Lee Jones | Lincoln | Thaddeus Stevens |
| 2013 | James Franco | Spring Breakers | Alien |
| 2014 | Edward Norton | Birdman or (The Unexpected Virtue of Ignorance) | Mike Shiner |
| 2015 | Michael Shannon | 99 Homes | Rick Carver |
| 2016 | Mahershala Ali | Moonlight | Juan |
| 2017 | Willem Dafoe | The Florida Project | Bobby Hicks |
| 2018 | Michael B. Jordan | Black Panther | N'Jadaka / Erik "Killmonger" Stevens |
| 2019 | Brad Pitt | Once Upon a Time in Hollywood | Cliff Booth |
| 2020 | Paul Raci | Sound of Metal | Joe |
| 2021 | Kodi Smit-McPhee | The Power of the Dog | Peter |
| 2022 | Ke Huy Quan | Everything Everywhere All at Once | Waymond Wang |
| 2023 | Robert Downey Jr. | Oppenheimer | Lewis Strauss |
| 2024 | Yura Borisov | Anora | Igor |
| 2025 | Benicio del Toro | One Battle After Another | Sergio St. Carlos |
