= Jacobi Jupe =

English child actor (born 2013)

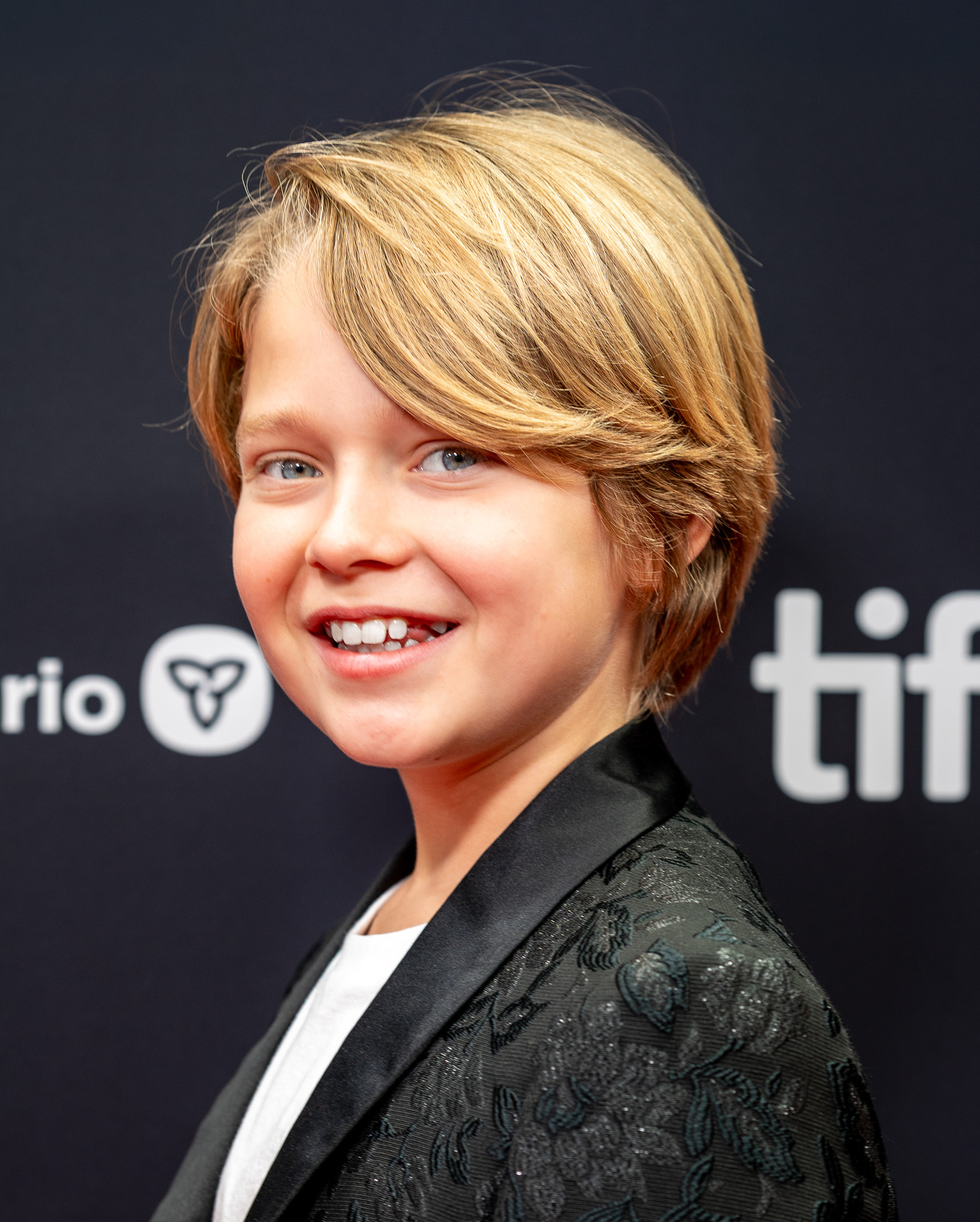
- Jupe in 2025 at the Toronto International Film Festival
- Born: 8 April 2013 (age 13)
- Occupation: Actor
- Years active: 2020–present
- Relatives: Katy Cavanagh (mother); Noah Jupe (brother)

Jacobi Jupe (born 8 April 2013) is an English actor. As a child, he gained recognition for his roles in film and television during the early 2020s before his breakthrough as the title character of Chloé Zhao's Hamnet (2025), which earned him acclaim.

== Life and career ==
Jupe is the son of filmmaker Chris Jupe and actor Katy Cavanagh, and the brother of actor Noah Jupe.

In March 2021, Jupe was cast as Michael Darling in the Disney+ film Peter Pan & Wendy. In January 2024, he was cast in the Apple TV+ miniseries Before. He is best known for playing the titular role in Chloé Zhao's Hamnet, for which he won the Astra Film Award for Best Young Performer, and received nominations for the Critics' Choice Movie Award for Best Young Performer, and the Washington D.C. Area Film Critics Association Award for Best Breakthrough Performance.

== Filmography ==
=== Film ===
Year	Title	Role	Director(s)	Notes
2023	Peter Pan & Wendy	Michael Darling	David Lowery	
2025	Hamnet	Hamnet Shakespeare	Chloé Zhao	
2026	Victorian Psycho	Andrew Pounds	Zachary Wigon	
2027	The Exorcist: Martyrs †	Max Miller	Mike Flanagan	Post-production

=== Television ===
Year	Title	Role	Notes
2021	Britannia	Cyrus	Recurring role; 8 episodes
2023	Tom Jones	Young Tom Jones	Miniseries; 1 episode
2024	Before	Noah	Miniseries; 10 episodes

=== Podcasts ===
Year	Title	Role	Director	Notes
2022	Cupid	Beau	Katy Cavanagh	Voice
