= After You'd Gone =

2000 novel by Maggie O'Farrell

- First edition
- Author: Maggie O'Farrell
- Language: English
- Publisher: Headline Review
- Publication date: 6 April 2000
- Publication place: United Kingdom
- Media type: Print
- Pages: 240
- ISBN: 0-74-727110-0

After You'd Gone is Northern Irish author Maggie O'Farrell's debut novel. Published in 2000 by Headline Review, it garnered 'international acclaim' and won a Betty Trask Award.

O'Farrell began writing the story that would later become "After You'd Gone" during an Arvon Foundation course in Yorkshire, where it received high praise from her tutors, Barbara Trapido and Elspeth Barker.

== Plot introduction ==
The novel centers Alice, a woman who is comatose after a suicide attempt. Through shifting timelines and perspectives, it explores the lives of three generations of women: Alice and her sisters Kirsty and Beth, their complex and secretive mother Ann, and their grandmother Elspeth, in whose North Berwick home they all lived. At the heart of the story is Alice’s relationship with her Jewish romantic partner John, who works in Canary Wharf and is caught in the 1996 Docklands bombing.

== Reception ==
According to Jane Rogers in the second edition of OUP's Good Fiction Guide, the novel was released to 'raptuous reviews'. Rogers commended the 'crystal-clear prose,' stating, "This is a love story and a family saga, but the skill with which it is constructed and written gives startling life to these traditional subjects: feelings of love and grief are rarely so well explored."

Elizabeth Speller, writing in The Guardian, praised the strength of the writing, stating, "What makes this book remarkable is a luminous use of language and imagery that transforms Alice's world into one of elements and sensations—a universe of light, smell, taste, heat, and sound."

Kirkus Reviews concludes, "O’Farrell is an astute observer of little behaviors, the telling fidgets and habits of everyday existence, and she's at her best when piecing these together to create a sense of a real life experienced through fiction. The complex structure works beautifully, communicating the shared and interlocking sufferings of the Raikes women through its carefully worked-out layering of narrative lines. Often painful to read, but finally quite satisfying."
