= San Francisco Bay Area Film Critics Circle Award for Best Director =

Annual US film award

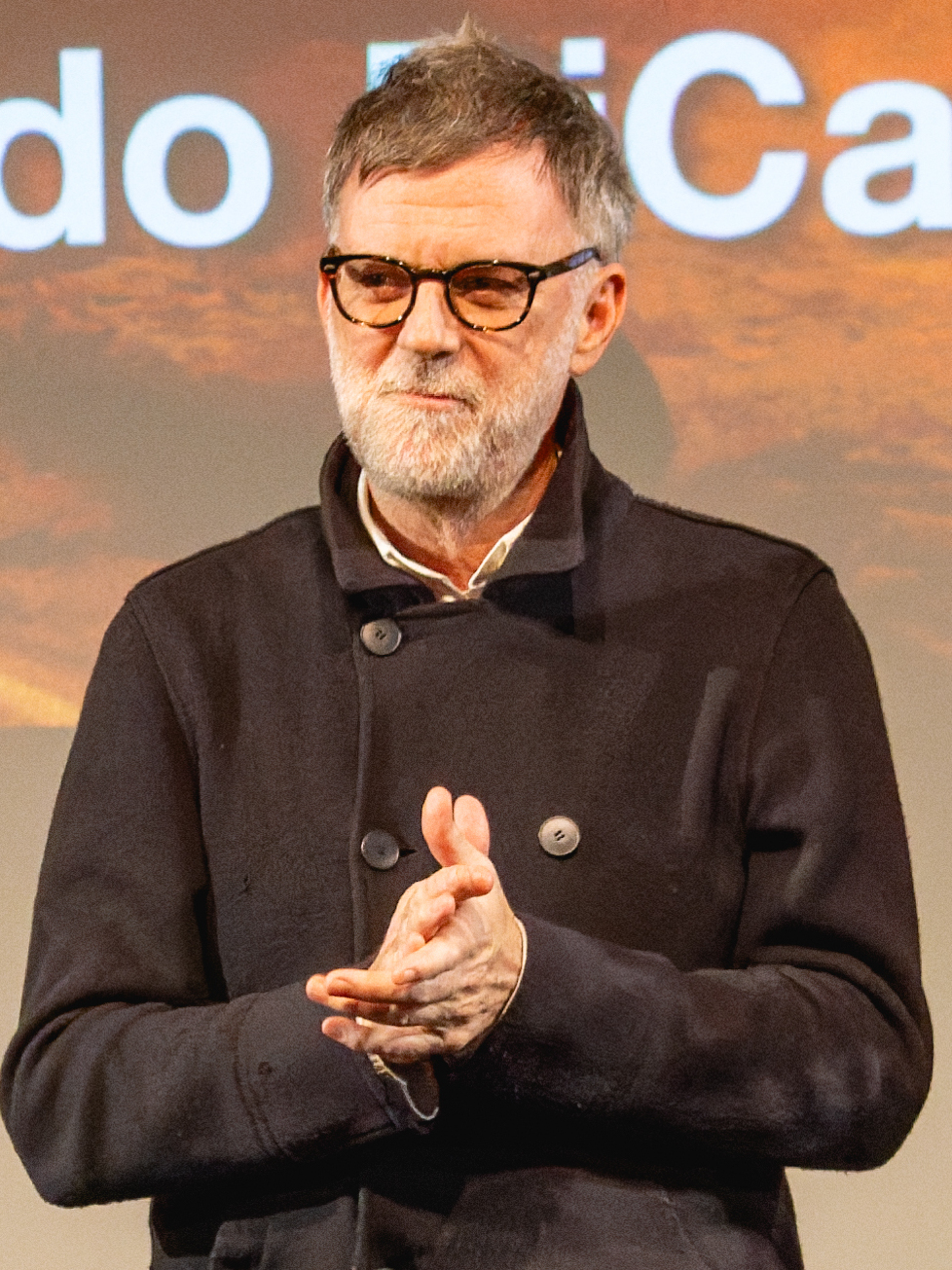
- The 2025 recipient: Paul Thomas Anderson
- Awarded for: Outstanding Directorial Achievement
- Country: United States
- Presented by: San Francisco Bay Area Film Critics Circle
- First award: Todd Haynes; Far from Heaven (2002)
- Currently held by: Paul Thomas Anderson; One Battle After Another (2025)
- Website: sfbafcc.com

The San Francisco Bay Area Film Critics Circle Award for Best Director is an award given by the San Francisco Bay Area Film Critics Circle to honor a film director who has delivered an outstanding directorial achievement in filmmaking.

== Winners ==
=== 2000s ===
| Year | Winner | Film |
|---|---|---|
| 2002 | Todd Haynes | Far from Heaven |
| 2003 | Peter Jackson | The Lord of the Rings: The Return of the King |
| 2004 | Alexander Payne | Sideways |
| 2005 | Ang Lee | Brokeback Mountain |
| 2006 | Paul Greengrass | United 93 |
| 2007 | Joel Coen and Ethan Coen | No Country for Old Men |
| 2008 | Gus Van Sant | Milk |
| 2009 | Kathryn Bigelow | The Hurt Locker |

=== 2010s ===
| Year | Winner | Film |
|---|---|---|
| 2010 | Darren Aronofsky (TIE) | Black Swan |
| 2010 | David Fincher (TIE) | The Social Network |
| 2011 | Terrence Malick | The Tree of Life |
| 2012 | Kathryn Bigelow | Zero Dark Thirty |
| 2013 | Alfonso Cuarón | Gravity |
| 2014 | Richard Linklater | Boyhood |
| 2015 | George Miller | Mad Max: Fury Road |
| 2016 | Barry Jenkins | Moonlight |
| 2017 | Guillermo del Toro | The Shape of Water |
| 2018 | Spike Lee | BlacKkKlansman |
| 2019 | Bong Joon-ho | Parasite |

=== 2020s ===
| Year | Winner | Film | Ref. |
|---|---|---|---|
| 2020 | Chloé Zhao | Nomadland | |
| 2021 | Jane Campion | The Power of the Dog | |
| 2022 | Todd Field | Tár | |
| 2023 | Jonathan Glazer | The Zone of Interest | |
| 2024 | Brady Corbet | The Brutalist | |
| 2025 | Paul Thomas Anderson | One Battle After Another | |
