= Hamnet (novel) =

2020 novel by Maggie O'Farrell

- First edition
- Author: Maggie O'Farrell
- Language: English
- Genre: Historical fiction
- Published: 31 March 2020
- Publisher: Tinder Press
- Publication place: United Kingdom
- Pages: 384
- Awards: Women's Prize (2020), National Book Critics (2020)
- ISBN: 978-1472223791 (1st ed. UK Hardcover)
- OCLC: 1104658967
- Dewey Decimal: 823/.914
- LC Class: PR6065.F36 H35 2020

Hamnet is a 2020 historical fiction novel by Maggie O'Farrell. It is a fictional account of William Shakespeare and Agnes Hathaway's son, Hamnet, who died at the age of eleven in 1596, and focuses on his parents' grief. In Canada, the novel was published under the title Hamnet & Judith.

== Plot and background ==
The book relates to the real-life death of William Shakespeare's only son Hamnet who was buried on 11 August 1596. It describes the circumstances of William Shakespeare's marriage with Agnes Hathaway (portrayed as a herbalist), the birth of their children and subsequent death of Hamnet, potentially from bubonic plague, which influenced Shakespeare's subsequent writing in the tragedy of his play Hamlet. The story includes some of the known facts of Shakespeare's life in the Tudor Period but also includes myths and other imagined fictions surrounding Hamnet's death.

O’Farrell explained in an interview that she "was always baffled and saddened by how little mention he [Hamnet] receives in biographies and literary criticism". She stated she wrote the novel, "to attempt to give him a voice and a presence". She says that she wrote with personal experience, citing her fear at the potential of losing her own child who had contracted meningitis at the age of four. She herself also suffered from encephalitis when aged eight and this left her with an understanding of the serious effects of bedridden illness. The book therefore describes the fighting of childhood illnesses and the subsequent psychological impact of sickness and death. As part of her research, O'Farrell researched Elizabethan era England and visited both Stratford-upon-Avon and the Globe Theatre.

== Publication ==
The book was first published in the United Kingdom on 31 March 2020 by Tinder Press, an imprint of Hachette Livre. It was published in the US on 21 July 2020 by Knopf Publishing Group of Penguin Random House. By early 2022, Hamnet had sold approximately 1.6 million copies. By 2024, it was reported to have exceeded 2 million copies sold, having been translated into 40 languages.

== Critical response and awards ==
In 2020, the book won the Women's Prize for Fiction and National Book Critics Circle Award for Fiction; that December, it was also chosen as Waterstones' Book of the Year. The following year, it was named "Novel of the Year" at the Dalkey Literary Awards, was shortlisted for the Walter Scott Prize, and longlisted for the Andrew Carnegie Medal for Excellence in Fiction. It was described in Literary Review as "a rich story by any stretch of the imagination, and O'Farrell's stretches much, much further than most of ours."

== Adaptations ==
In 2023, a stage adaptation of the novel by Lolita Chakrabarti premiered at the Royal Shakespeare Company in Stratford-upon-Avon, re-opening the Swan Theatre after the COVID-19 pandemic and refurbishment. In September, the play transferred to the Garrick Theatre in London, directed by Erica Whyman and starring Madeleine Mantock as Agnes Hathaway, Tom Varey as William Shakespeare and Ajani Cabey as Hamnet. It was scheduled to play until at least February 2024. The play's U.S. tour premiered at the Chicago Shakespeare Theater in February 2026, followed by additional performances at the Shakespeare Theatre Company in Washington, D.C. and the American Conservatory Theater in San Francisco.

A film adaptation of Hamnet directed by Chloé Zhao was announced in April 2023, with Jessie Buckley as Agnes Hathaway and Paul Mescal as William Shakespeare. The film was released in the United Kingdom in January 2026. It won awards for the Best Motion Picture – Drama at the 83rd Golden Globe Awards, and Outstanding British Film at the 79th British Academy Film Awards. For her role in the film, Buckley won the Golden Globe Award for Best Actress in a Motion Picture – Drama, the Critics' Choice Movie Award for Best Actress,, the Actor Award for Outstanding Performance by a Female Actor in a Leading Role, the BAFTA Award for Best Actress in a Leading Role, and the Academy Award for Best Actress. The film was selected as one of the top 10 films of 2025 by the American Film Institute. It had a successful run at the box-office, grossing about $109 million against a reported budget of $30-35 million, and led to a surge of sales for the book.

== Awards ==
Awards and honours for Hamnet
Year	Award/Honour	Category	Result	Ref.
2020	National Book Critics Circle Award	Fiction	Won	
2020	Women's Prize for Fiction	—N/a	Won	
2021	Andrew Carnegie Medal	Fiction	Longlisted	
2021	Dalkey Literary Awards	Novel of the Year	Won	
2021	Walter Scott Prize	—N/a	Shortlisted	
