= Maggie O'Farrell =

Irish-British novelist (born 1972)

Maggie O'Farrell FRSL
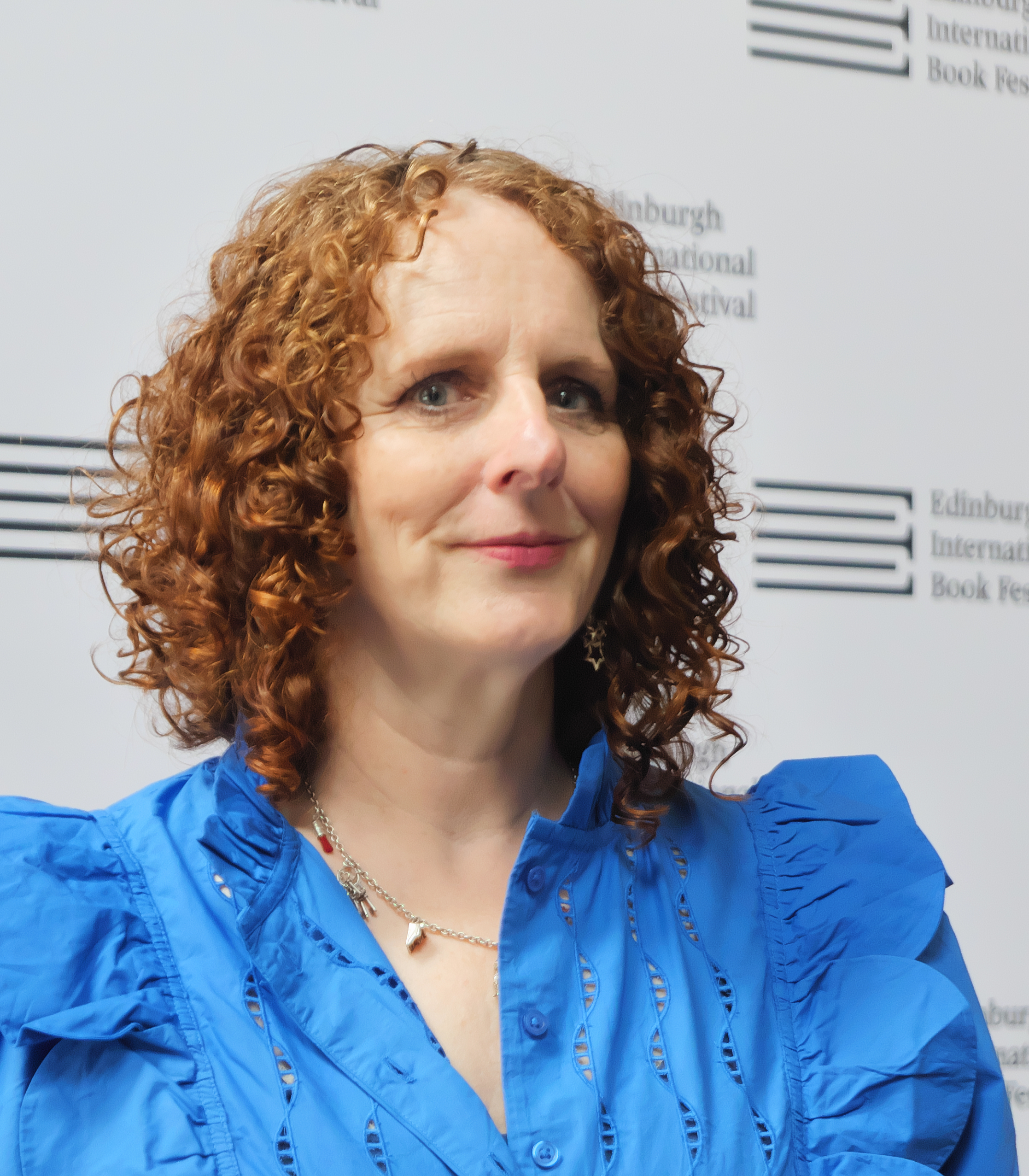
- O'Farrell at 2025 Edinburgh International Book Festival
- Born: 1972 (age 53–54); Coleraine, County Londonderry, Northern Ireland
- Education: New Hall, Cambridge
- Occupation: Novelist
- Spouse: William Sutcliffe
- Children: 3
- Writing career
- Genres: Fiction, historical fiction
- Notable works: After You'd Gone (2000); The Hand That First Held Mine (2010); Hamnet (2020); The Marriage Portrait (2022)
- Website: maggieofarrell.com

Maggie O'Farrell FRSL (born 1972) is an Irish-British novelist. Her acclaimed first novel, After You'd Gone, won the Betty Trask Award and a later one, The Hand That First Held Mine, the 2010 Costa Novel Award. She has twice been shortlisted since for the Costa Novel Award for Instructions for a Heatwave in 2014 and This Must Be The Place in 2017. Her memoir I Am, I Am, I Am: Seventeen Brushes with Death reached the top of the Sunday Times bestseller list. Her novel Hamnet won the Women's Prize for Fiction in 2020, the fiction prize at the 2020 National Book Critics Circle Awards. O'Farrell co-adapted the book for the screen with Chloé Zhao in 2025, and was nominated for an Academy Award for Best Adapted Screenplay for her work on the film.

== Early life and education ==
Maggie O'Farrell was born in 1972 in Coleraine, County Londonderry, Northern Ireland. The family moved a number of times when she was a child, spending her childhood in Dublin and Wales, before settling in Scotland. She spent her childhood summers in Dublin, Galway and Donegal. O'Farrell stated that she wished she had an Irish accent like her cousins and that in Britain she felt Irish, and in Ireland she felt British. At the age of eight she was hospitalised with encephalitis, and missed over a year of school. She was at first unable to hold a pen or a book, and was told that she would never walk again, but after two years of intensive rehabilitation, she started to walk. She says that this period fostered her love of literature. These events are echoed in The Distance Between Us and described in her 2017 memoir I Am, I Am, I Am.

She was educated at North Berwick High School and Brynteg Comprehensive School, and then at New Hall, University of Cambridge (now Murray Edwards College), where she read English Literature. O'Farrell has stated that well into the 1990s, being Irish in Britain could be fraught. "We used to get endless Irish jokes, even from teachers. It wasn't funny at all". Nevertheless, not until 2013's Instructions for a Heatwave did Irish subjects become part of her work.

== Early career ==
O'Farrell worked as a journalist, first for a computer magazine in Hong Kong, and then on the arts desk of The Independent on Sunday in London. During this time, she participated in several writing workshops, including with the poets Jo Shapcott and Michael Donaghy.

She also taught creative writing at the University of Warwick in Coventry and Goldsmiths College in London.

== Books ==
O'Farrell's numerous successful novels, including the Costa Award-winning The Hand that First Held Mine, have received widespread critical acclaim. Her books have been translated into over 30 languages. Her novel Hamnet, based on the life of Shakespeare's family, was published in 2020. The novel makes a link between the death of eleven-year-old Hamnet and the writing of the play Hamlet.

She began writing her seventh novel, This Must Be the Place, in 2013, shortly after the birth of her third child. It was published in May 2016. Hannah Beckermann, writing in The Guardian, called it a "a tour de force... both technically dazzling and deeply moving... her best novel to date".

Her 2017 memoir, I Am, I Am, I Am: Seventeen Brushes with Death, deals with a series of near-death experiences that have happened to her or her children. It is a memoir told non-chronologically, with each chapter headed by the name of the body part affected.

From 2020 to 2022, O'Farrell published two picture books for children, Where Snow Angels Go and The Boy Who Lost His Spark, both illustrated by Daniela Jaglenka Terrazzini.

O'Farrell was invited as the castaway on the BBC Radio 4 programme Desert Island Discs in March 2021.

In 2022, she published The Marriage Portrait, a novel based on the short life of Lucrezia de' Medici, who may or may not have been poisoned by her husband, Alfonso II, Duke of Ferrara. O'Farrell has said that she got the idea for the novel after seeing Lucrezia's portrait, attributed to Agnolo Bronzino, and from reading Robert Browning's poem "My Last Duchess", in which Lucrezia makes a brief, silent and unnamed appearance. The novel was shortlisted for the Women's Prize for Fiction.

In May 2022, during the close of the Stratford Literary Festival, O'Farrell planted two European mountain ash trees and memorial plaques at the graveyard in Church of the Holy Trinity, Stratford-upon-Avon for Hamnet and Judith Shakespeare, who had not had a visible memorial since their deaths in the 16th century.

In 2023 O'Farrell won the author award at Harper's Bazaar's Women of the Year awards.

In September 2025, O'Farrell announced her next book, titled Land, set in Ireland in the aftermath of the 1840s famine. It was published in June 2026.

== Adaptations ==
=== Hamnet ===
==== On the stage ====
In April 2023, the Royal Shakespeare Company's stage adaptation of Hamnet previewed at the newly opened Swan Theatre in Stratford-upon-Avon. It transferred to the Garrick Theatre, London, in September 2023.

==== Film ====
In January 2024, Chloé Zhao made plans to adapt Hamnet for the screen alongside O'Farrell. Paul Mescal and Jessie Buckley were chosen for the leading roles. Focus Features will be a creative partner on the project. Emily Watson and Joe Alwyn also joined the cast in supporting roles. Directors Steven Spielberg and Sam Mendes joined on as producers for the film in August 2024, shortly after filming finished.

Hamnet world premiered at the 52nd Telluride Film Festival to rave reviews. The film then went to the Toronto International Film Festival, where it won the highly coveted People's Choice Award. The film had a limited theatrical release in the United States on 27 November before expanding nationwide on 12 December. The film was released in the UK on 9 January.

In 2026, the film won the Golden Globe Award for Best Motion Picture – Drama.

=== The Marriage Portrait ===
In May 2024, Audrey Diwan was attached to direct a film adaptation of The Marriage Portrait for Element Pictures and Wildside. No further details have been announced.

== Personal life ==
O'Farrell married fellow writer William Sutcliffe, whom she met while they were students at Cambridge; they didn't become a couple, however, until about ten years after they graduated. As of 2017, they lived in Edinburgh, Scotland, with their three children. She has said of Sutcliffe: "Will's always been my first reader, even before we were a couple, so he's a huge influence. He's brutal but you need that". One of O'Farrell's children suffers with severe allergies, the challenges of which she writes about in her memoir.

== Recognition and awards ==
O'Farrell appeared in Waterstones' 25 Authors for the Future list in 2007.

In July 2021 she was announced as a Fellow of the Royal Society of Literature (FRSL).

In 2026 O'Farrell was nominated, along with Chloé Zhao, for Best Adapted Screenplay in the Academy Awards for the film Hamnet. They would eventually win Best Script at the Irish Film & Television Awards.

=== Literary awards ===
| Year | Title | Award/honour | Result | Ref. |
|---|---|---|---|---|
| 2001 | After You'd Gone | Betty Trask Award | Won | |
| 2005 | The Distance Between Us | Somerset Maugham Award | Won | |
| 2010 | The Hand That First Held Mine | Costa Book Award for Fiction | Won | |
| 2013 | Instructions for a Heatwave | Costa Book Award for Fiction | Shortlisted | |
| 2016 | This Must be the Place | Costa Book Award for Fiction | Shortlisted | |
| 2018 | I Am, I Am, I Am | PEN/Ackerley Prize | Shortlisted | |
| 2020 | Hamnet | National Book Critics Circle Award for Fiction | Won | |
| 2020 | Hamnet | Women's Prize for Fiction | Won | |
| 2021 | Hamnet | Andrew Carnegie Medal for Excellence in Fiction | Longlisted | |
| 2021 | Hamnet | Dalkey Literary Awards's Novel of the Year | Won | |
| 2021 | Hamnet | Walter Scott Prize | Shortlisted | |
| 2023 | The Boy Who Lost His Spark | KPMG Children's Books Ireland Awards | Won | |

== Bibliography ==
=== Novels ===
- After You'd Gone (2000)
- My Lover's Lover (2002)
- The Distance Between Us (2004)
- The Vanishing Act of Esme Lennox (2006)
- The Hand That First Held Mine (2010)
- Instructions for a Heatwave (2013)
- This Must Be the Place (2016)
- Hamnet (2020), Tinder Press ISBN 978-1-4722-2379-1
- The Marriage Portrait (2022), Tinder Press ISBN 978-1-4722-2384-5
- Land (2026), Tinder Press ISBN 978-1-4722-8908-7

=== Autobiography/memoir ===
- I Am, I Am, I Am: Seventeen Brushes with Death (2017)

=== Children's books ===
- Where Snow Angels Go, Walker Books, illustrated by Daniela Jaglenka Terrazzini (2020)
- The Boy Who Lost His Spark, Walker Books, illustrated by Daniela Jaglenka Terrazzini (2022)

=== Screenplays ===
- Hamnet with Chloé Zhao (2025)
