= Florida Film Critics Circle Awards 2025 =

Annual US film awards ceremony

30th FFCC Awards

December 19, 2025

Best Picture:
One Battle After Another

The 30th Florida Film Critics Circle Awards took place on December 19, 2025.

The nominations were announced on December 15, 2025. Paul Thomas Anderson's action thriller One Battle After Another and Ryan Coogler's period supernatural horror film Sinners led the nominations with twelve apiece, followed by No Other Choice with seven and Resurrection with six. One Battle After Another earned the most awards, winning six, including Best Picture, Best Supporting Actor for Sean Penn, Best Supporting Actress for Teyana Taylor and Best Adapted Screenplay for Anderson. This year, Best Editing was voted by the FFCC as a new category.

Although the film did not receive a theatrical release in the United States, the FFCC nominated Renée Zellweger for Best Actress for Bridget Jones: Mad About the Boy.

== Winners and nominees ==
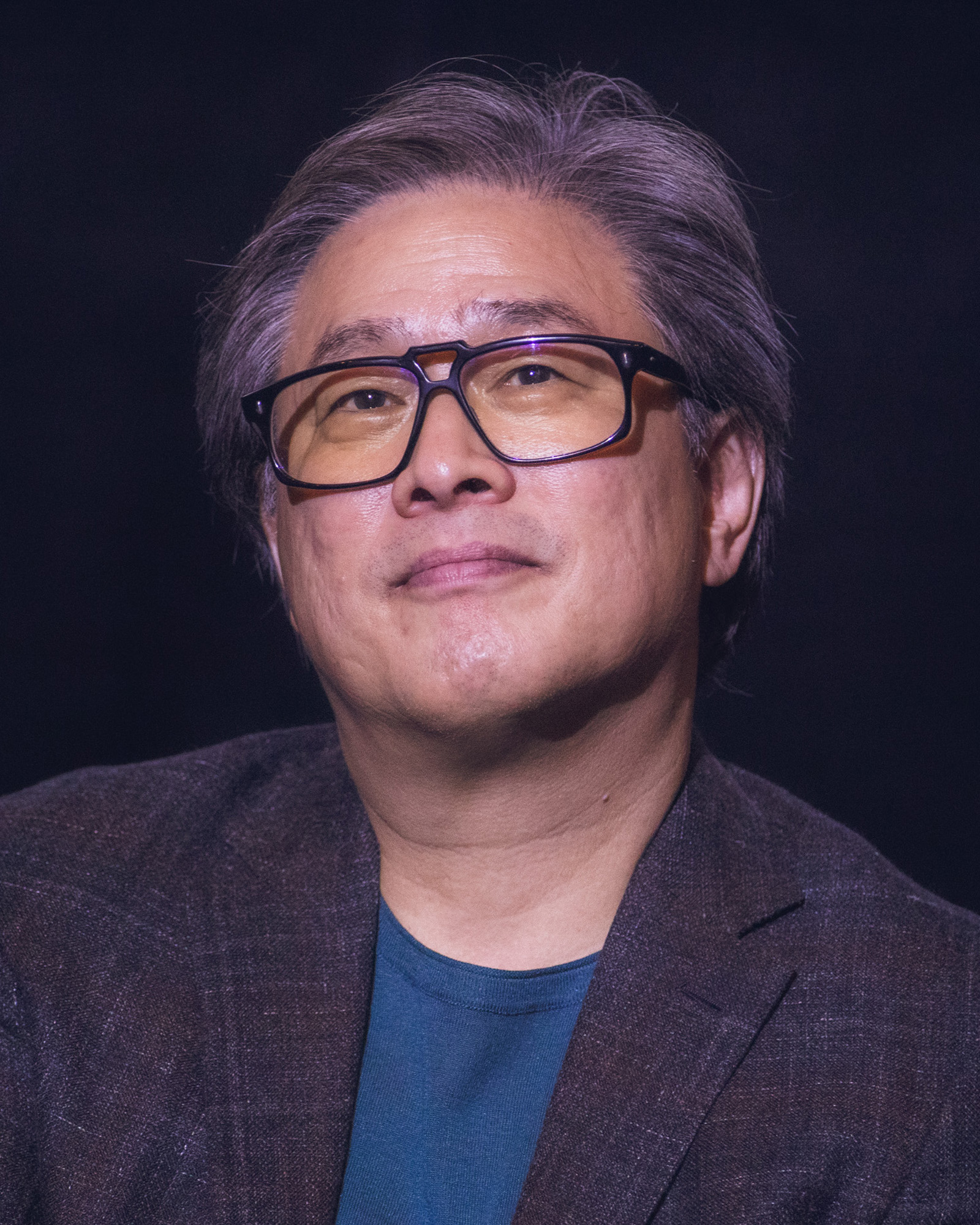
Park Chan-wook, Best Director winner

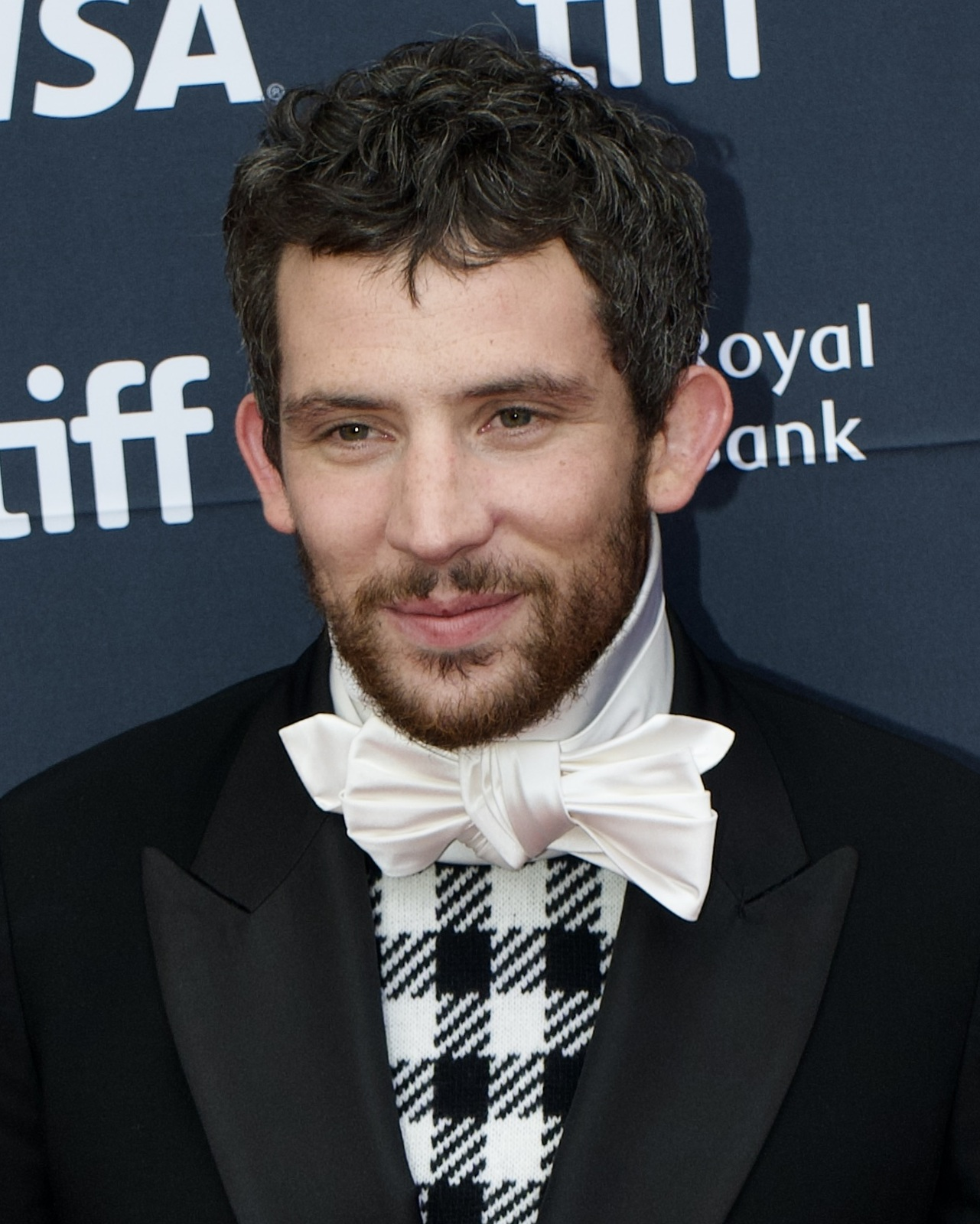
Josh O'Connor, Best Actor winner

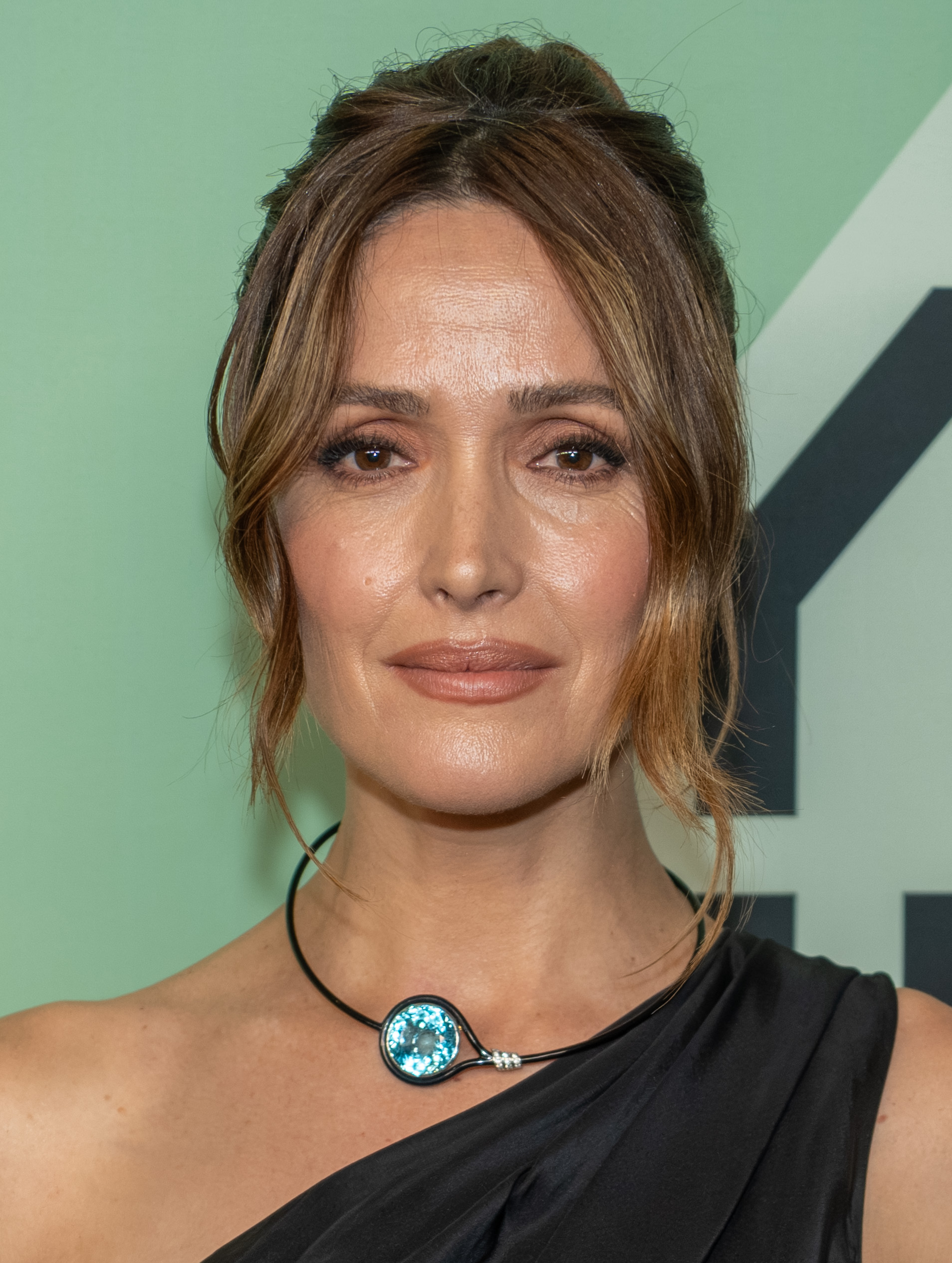
Rose Byrne, Best Actress winner

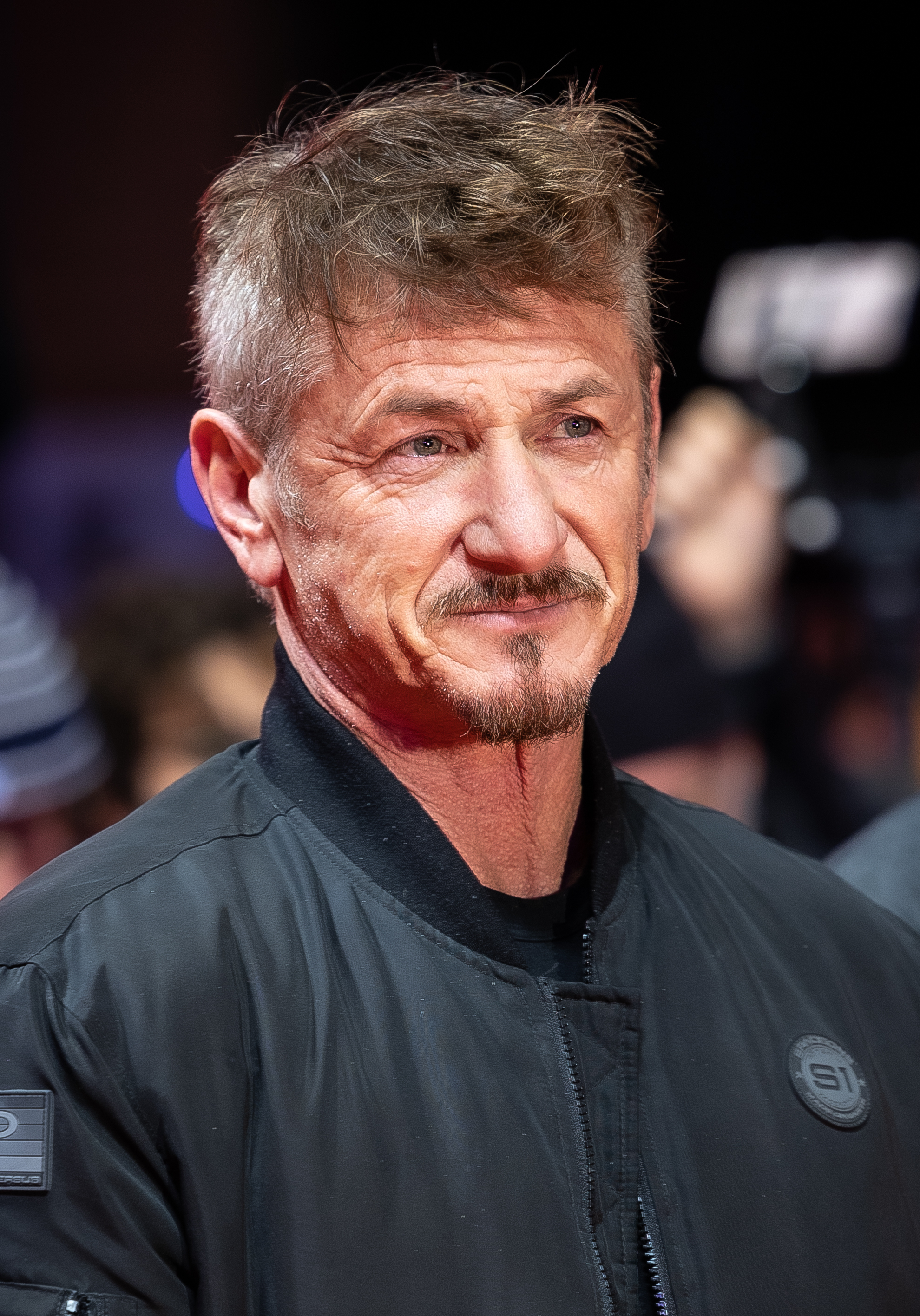
Sean Penn, Best Supporting Actor winner

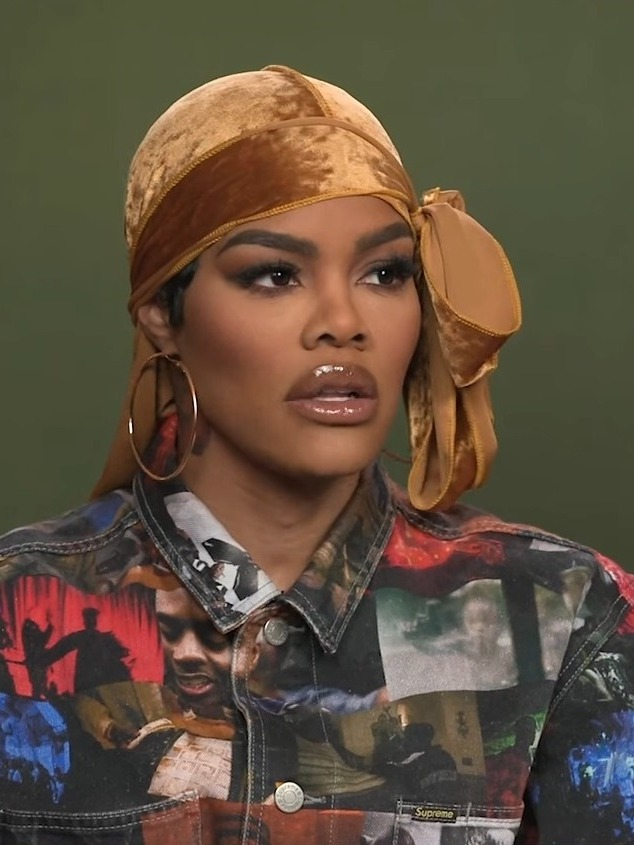
Teyana Taylor, Best Supporting Actress winner

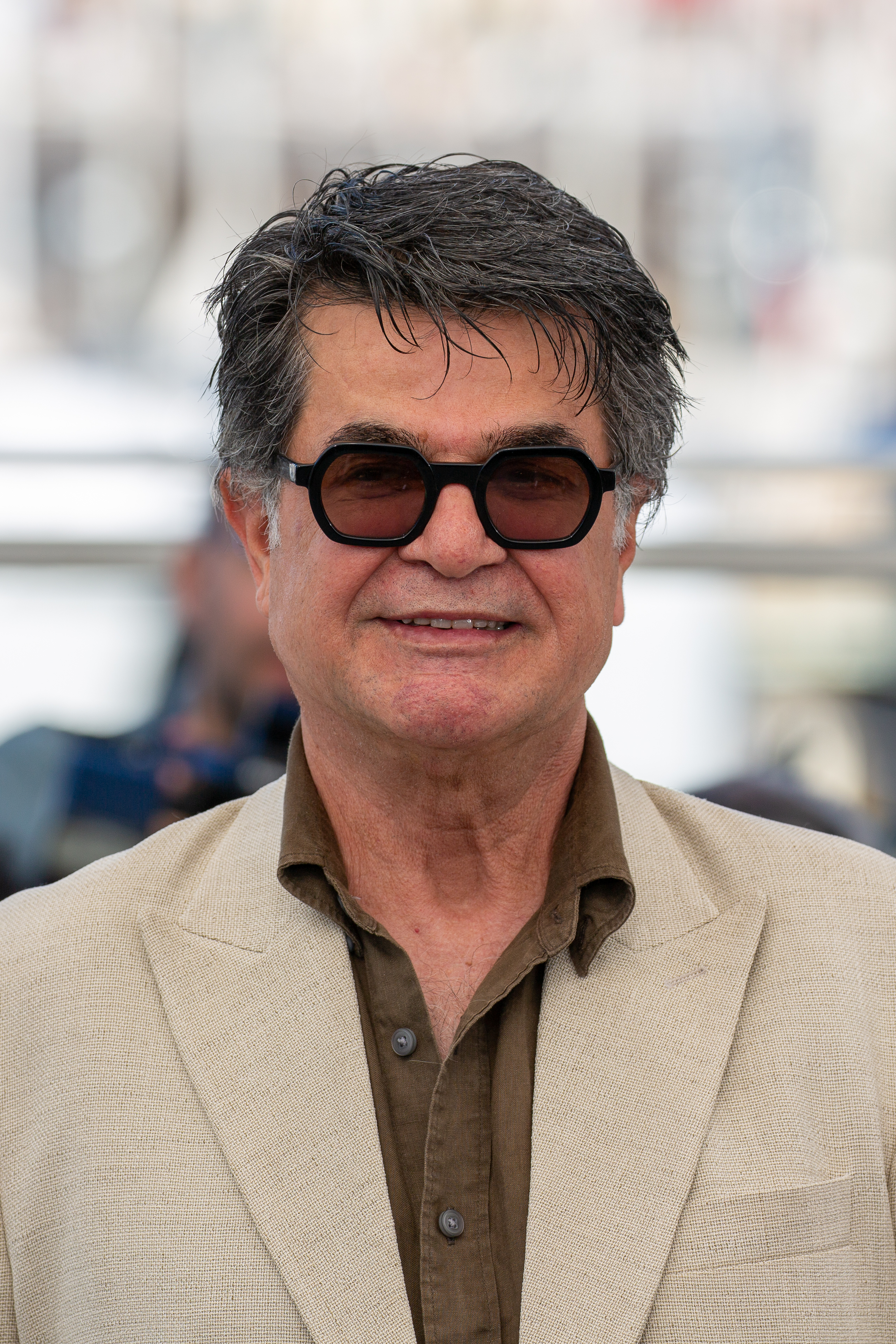
Jafar Panahi, Best Original Screenplay winner

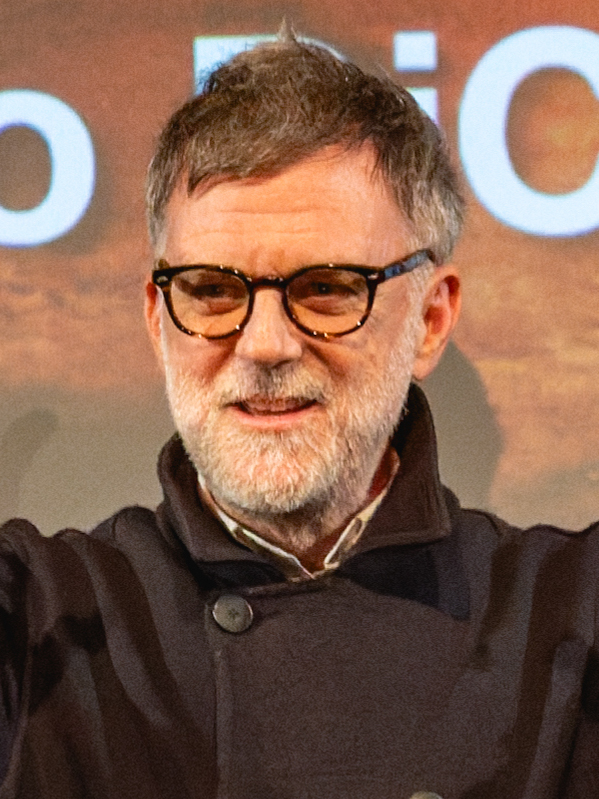
Paul Thomas Anderson, Best Adapted Screenplay winner

Winners are listed at the top of each list in bold, while the runner-ups for each category are listed under them.

Best Picture	Best Director
**One Battle After Another**; Runner-up: No Other Choice; Grand Tour; The Mastermind; Sinners	**Park Chan-wook – No Other Choice**; Runner-up: Paul Thomas Anderson – One Battle After Another; Ryan Coogler – Sinners; Bi Gan – Resurrection; Kelly Reichardt – The Mastermind
Best Actor	Best Actress
**Josh O'Connor – The Mastermind as James Blaine "J.B." Mooney**; Lee Byung-hun – No Other Choice as Yoo Man-su; Timothée Chalamet – Marty Supreme as Marty Mauser; Leonardo DiCaprio – One Battle After Another as Bob Ferguson; Wagner Moura – The Secret Agent as Armando Solimões / Marcelo Alves / Fernando Solimões	**Rose Byrne – If I Had Legs I'd Kick You as Linda**; Runner-up: Jennifer Lawrence – Die My Love as Grace; Crista Alfaiate – Grand Tour as Molly; Jessie Buckley – Hamnet as Agnes Shakespeare; Renée Zellweger – Bridget Jones: Mad About the Boy as Bridget Jones
Best Supporting Actor	Best Supporting Actress
**Sean Penn – One Battle After Another as Col. Steven J. Lockjaw**; Runner-up: David Jonsson – The Long Walk as Peter "Pete" McVries; Benicio del Toro – One Battle After Another as Sensei Sergio St. Carlos; Jacques Develay – Misericordia as Abbé Philippe Griseul; Delroy Lindo – Sinners as Delta Slim	**Teyana Taylor – One Battle After Another as Perfidia Beverly Hills**; Runner-up: Wunmi Mosaku – Sinners as Annie; Rita Cortese – Most People Die on Sundays as Dora; Amy Madigan – Weapons as Gladys; Mia Threapleton – The Phoenician Scheme as Sister Liesl
Best Original Screenplay	Best Adapted Screenplay
**It Was Just an Accident – Jafar Panahi**; Runner-up: Rent Free – Fernando Andrés and Tyler Rugh; The Astronaut Lovers – Marco Berger; If I Had Legs I'd Kick You – Mary Bronstein; Sentimental Value – Eskil Vogt and Joachim Trier; Sinners – Ryan Coogler	**One Battle After Another – Paul Thomas Anderson**; Runner-up: No Other Choice – Park Chan-wook, Lee Kyoung-mi, Don McKellar, and Lee Ja-hye; Bugonia – Will Tracy; Hamnet – Chloé Zhao and Maggie O'Farrell; Little Amélie or the Character of Rain – Liane-Cho Han, Aude Py, Maïlys Vallade, and Eddine Noël
Best Animated Film	Best Documentary Film
**Little Amélie or the Character of Rain**; Runner-up: 100 Meters; Arco; KPop Demon Hunters; Zootopia 2	**Sabbath Queen**; Runner-up: BLKNWS: Terms & Conditions; The Perfect Neighbor; Predators; River of Grass
Best International Film	Best Ensemble
**Grand Tour (Portugal) (TIE)**; **No Other Choice (South Korea) (TIE)**; It Was Just an Accident (Iran); Resurrection (China); The Secret Agent (Brazil); Sirāt (Spain)	**Sinners**; Runner-up: One Battle After Another; Eephus; The Secret Agent; Sentimental Value
Best Art Direction / Production Design	Best Cinematography
**Resurrection**; Runner-up: Frankenstein; The Phoenician Scheme; The Secret Agent; Sinners	**Resurrection – Dong Jingsong**; Runner-up: Sinners – Autumn Durald Arkapaw; Grand Tour – Gui Liang, Sayombhu Mukdeeprom, and Rui Poças; One Battle After Another – Michael Bauman and Paul Thomas Anderson; Sirāt – Mauro Herce
Best Editing	Best Original Score
**One Battle After Another – Andy Jurgensen**; Runner-up: Die My Love – Toni Froschhammer; Marty Supreme – Ronald Bronstein and Josh Safdie; No Other Choice – Kim Sang-bum and Kim Ho-bin; Sinners – Michael P. Shawver	**Sinners – Ludwig Göransson**; Runner-up: The Mastermind – Rob Mazurek; One Battle After Another – Jonny Greenwood; Resurrection – M83; Sirāt – Kangding Ray
Best Visual Effects	Best First Feature
**Avatar: Fire and Ash**; Runner-up: Frankenstein; No Other Choice; Resurrection; Sinners	**Sorry, Baby – Eva Victor**; Runner-up: Eephus – Carson Lund; BLKNWS: Terms & Conditions – Kahlil Joseph; Lurker – Alex Russell; The Ugly Stepsister – Emilie Blichfeldt
Pauline Kael Breakout Award	Golden Orange
**Chase Infiniti – One Battle After Another as Willa Ferguson**; Runner-up: Eva Victor – Sorry, Baby as Agnes; Miles Caton – Sinners as Samuel "Sammie" Moore; Jacobi Jupe – Hamnet as Hamnet Shakespeare; Théodore Pellerin – Lurker as Matthew Morning	**River of Grass**; No Sleep Till
