= List of awards and nominations received by Sam Mendes =

List of accolades received by Sam Mendes
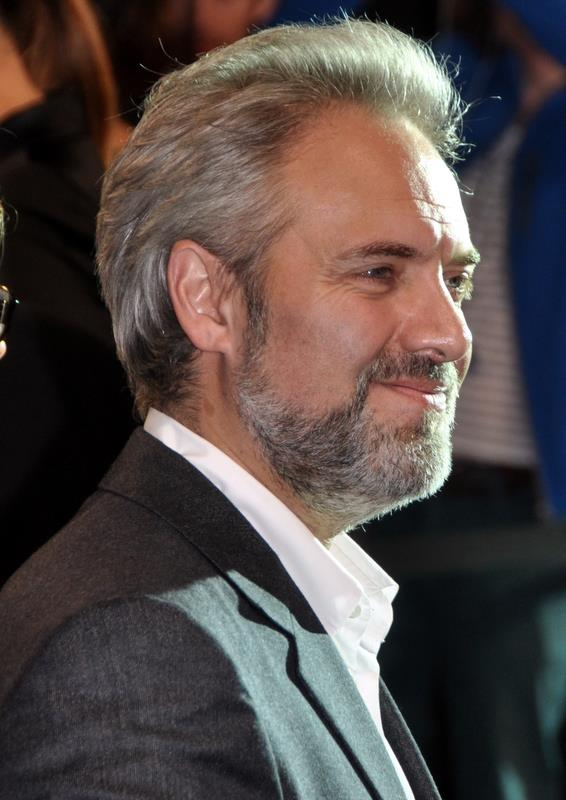
- Mendes at the premiere of Skyfall (2012)
Accolades
Award	Wins	Nominations
Academy Awards	1	5
BAFTA Film Awards	5	8
BAFTA TV Awards	0	2
Critics' Choice	2	3
Golden Globes	2	3
Olivier Awards	3	12
Tony Awards	2	4

Totals (Note: Certain award groups do not simply award one winner. They acknowledge several different recipients, have runners-up, and have third place. Since this is a specific recognition and is different from losing an award, runner-up mentions are considered wins in this award tally. For simplification and to avoid errors, each award in this list has been presumed to have had a prior nomination.)
- Wins: 42
- Nominations: 63

This is a list of awards and nominations received by Sam Mendes

Sam Mendes is a British film and stage director, producer, and screenwriter. He has received various accolades including an Academy Award, four British Academy Film Awards, two Critics' Choice Awards, two Golden Globe Awards, three Laurence Olivier Awards, and two Tony Awards. He earned several honors including the Society of London Theatre Special Award in 2003, and the John Schlesinger Britannia Award for Excellence in Directing in 2015. Mendes was appointed a CBE for his services to drama in 2000 and he was knighted in the 2020.

Mendes started his career on the stage directing numerous productions on the West End. He won three Laurence Olivier Awards for Best Director for the Stephen Sondheim musical Company and the Tennessee Williams play The Glass Menagerie in 1996, the William Shakespeare revival Twelfth Night and the Anton Chekov revival Uncle Vanya in 2003, and the Jez Butterworth play The Ferryman in 2018. Mendes also is known for directing several productions on Broadway winning the Tony Award for Best Direction of a Play twice for The Ferryman in 2019 and The Lehman Trilogy in 2022. He was Tony-nominated for directing the musical Cabaret in 1998 and the play The Hills of California in 2025.

On film, he gained acclaim and prominence for directing the suburban family drama American Beauty (1999) which earned five Academy Awards including the Best Director for Mendes at the 72nd Academy Awards. Mendes also earned the Golden Globe Award for Best Director, the Directors Guild of America Award for Outstanding Directing – Feature Film, and the Critics' Choice Movie Award for Best Director as well as a nomination for the BAFTA Award for Best Direction. He directed the crime drama Road to Perdition (2002) and the 1950s romantic drama Revolutionary Road (2008) earning nominations for the Venice International Film Festival Golden Lion and the Golden Globe Award for Best Director respectively.

He expanded his career when he directed the action film Skyfall (2012), part of the James Bond franchise, for which he earned critical acclaim as well as a nomination for the BAFTA Award for Outstanding British Film. He gained further acclaim for directing the World War I drama film 1917 (2019) for which he earned several accolades including three BAFTA Awards (Best Film, Best Direction, and Outstanding British Film), the Golden Globe Award for Best Director, the Directors Guild of America Award for Outstanding Directing – Feature Film and the Critics' Choice Movie Award for Best Director as well as nominations for three Academy Awards (for Best Picture, Best Director, and Best Original Screenplay).

For his work on television, he received two British Academy Television Award nominations (Best Single Drama and Best Mini-Series) for the BBC Two / PBS series The Hollow Crown (2013, 2017) which adapts the plays of William Shakespeare.

== Major Associations ==
=== Academy Awards ===
Year	Category	Nominated work	Result	Ref.
1999	Best Director	American Beauty	Won	
2019	Best Picture	1917	Nominated	
2019	Best Director	1917	Nominated	
2019	Best Original Screenplay	1917	Nominated	
2026	Best Picture	Hamnet	Nominated	

=== BAFTA Awards ===
Year	Category	Nominated work	Result	Ref.
British Academy Film Awards
1999	Best Direction	American Beauty	Nominated	
2012	Best British Film	Skyfall	Won	
2019	Best Film	1917	Won	
2019	Best British Film	1917	Won	
2019	Best Direction	1917	Won	
2022	Best British Film	Empire of Light	Nominated	
2026	Best Film	Hamnet	Nominated	
2026	Best British Film	Hamnet	Won	
British Academy Television Awards
2013	Best Single Drama	The Hollow Crown	Nominated	
2017	Best Mini-Series	The Hollow Crown	Nominated	

=== Critics' Choice Awards ===
Year	Category	Nominated work	Result	Ref.
Critics' Choice Awards
1999	Best Director	American Beauty	Won	
2019	Best Picture	1917	Nominated	
2019	Best Director (Note: Tied with Bong Joon-ho for Parasite.)	1917	Won	

=== Golden Globe Awards ===
Year	Category	Nominated work	Result	Ref.
1999	Best Director – Motion Picture	American Beauty	Won	
2008	Best Director – Motion Picture	Revolutionary Road	Nominated	
2019	Best Director – Motion Picture	1917	Won	

=== Laurence Olivier Awards ===
Year	Category	Nominated work	Result	Ref.
1993	Best Director of a Play	Assassins	Nominated	
1993	Best Director of a Musical	The Rise and Fall of Little Voice	Nominated	
1994	Best Director of a Musical	Cabaret	Nominated	
1994	Best Musical Revival	Cabaret	Nominated	
1995	Best Director of a Musical	Oliver!	Nominated	
1996	Best Director	Company / The Glass Menagerie	Won	
1998	Best Director	Othello	Nominated	
1999	Best Director	The Blue Room	Nominated	
2003	Best Director	Twelfth Night / Uncle Vanya	Won	
2018	Best Director	The Ferryman	Won	
2019	Best Director	The Lehman Trilogy	Nominated	
2024	Best Director	The Motive and the Cue	Nominated	

=== Tony Awards ===
Year	Category	Nominated work	Result	Ref.
1998	Best Direction of a Musical (with Rob Marshall)	Cabaret	Nominated	
2019	Best Direction of a Play	The Ferryman	Won	
2022	Best Direction of a Play	The Lehman Trilogy	Won	
2025	Best Direction of a Play	The Hills of California	Nominated	

== Miscellaneous awards ==
Award	Year	Category	Nominated work	Result	Ref.
Camerimage Film Festival	2022	Special Krzysztof Kieslowski Award for Director	Empire of Light	Awarded	
Cinema of Peace Award	2019	Most valuable Film Award	1917	Won	
Directors Guild of America Award	1999	Outstanding Directorial Achievement – Feature Film	American Beauty	Won	
Directors Guild of America Award	2019	Outstanding Directorial Achievement – Feature Film	1917	Won	
Drama Desk Award	1998	Outstanding Director of a Musical	Cabaret	Nominated	
Drama Desk Award	2003	Outstanding Director of a Play	Uncle Vanya and Twelfth Night	Nominated	
Drama Desk Award	2012	Outstanding Director of a Play	Richard III	Nominated	
Drama Desk Award	2019	Outstanding Director of a Play	The Ferryman	Won	
Drama League Awards	2022	Outstanding Director of a Play	The Lehman Trilogy	Nominated	
Empire Awards	2012	Best Director	Skyfall	Won	
Evening Standard British Film Awards	2012	Film of the Year	Skyfall	Won	
Evening Standard Theatre Awards	1992	Best New Comedy	The Rise and Fall of Little Voice	Won	
Evening Standard Theatre Awards	2002	Director of the Year	Uncle Vanya / Twelfth Night	Won	
Evening Standard Theatre Awards	2017	Best Director	The Ferryman	Won	
Hollywood Film Awards	2005	Best Director	Jarhead	Won	
Jupiter Awards	2012	Best International Film	Skyfall	Won	
Producers Guild of America Award	2019	Outstanding Producer of Theatrical Motion Pictures	1917	Won	
ShoWest Convention	2002	USA Director of the Year	Road to Perdition	Won	
Saturn Awards	2012	Best Action or Adventure Film	Skyfall	Won	
Toronto International Film Festival	1999	People's Choice Award	American Beauty	Won	
Venice International Film Festival	2002	Golden Lion	Road to Perdition	Nominated	
Whats on Stage Award	2018	Best Director	The Ferryman	Won	
Writers Guild of America Award	2019	Best Original Screenplay	1917	Nominated	

== Critics awards ==
Award	Year	Category	Nominated work	Result	Ref.
Belgian Film Critics Association	2020	Grand Prix	1917	Won	
Critics' Circle Theatre Award	1989	Most Promising Newcomer	The Cherry Orchard	Won	
Critics' Circle Theatre Award	1995	Best Director	The Glass Menagerie	Won	
Critics' Circle Theatre Award	2002	Best Director	Uncle Vanya / Twelfth Night	Won	
London Film Critics' Circle	1999	Director of the Year	American Beauty	Won	
Los Angeles Film Critics Association	1999	Best Director	American Beauty	Won	
Outer Critics Circle Awards	2019	Outstanding Director of a Play	The Ferryman	Won	
Outer Critics Circle Awards	2022	Outstanding Director of a Play	The Lehman Trilogy	Won	
Washington D.C. Area Film Critics Association	2002	Best Director	Road to Perdition	Won	

== Honorary awards ==
Organizations	Year	Award	Result	Ref.
Britannia Award	2015	John Schlesinger Britannia Award for Excellence in Directing	Honored	
Directors Guild of Great Britain	2005	Lifetime Achievement Award	Honored	
Queen Elizabeth II	2000	Commander of the Order of the British Empire (CBE)	Honored	
Queen Elizabeth II	2020	Knight Commander of the Order of the British Empire (KBE)	Honored	
Laurence Olivier Award	2003	Society of London Theatre Special Award	Honored	
