= Untitled Damien Chazelle film =

Upcoming American drama film

- Directed by: Damien Chazelle
- Written by: Damien Chazelle
- Produced by: Damien Chazelle; Olivia Hamilton
- Starring: Daniel Craig; Cillian Murphy; Michelle Williams; Mia Threapleton
- Cinematography: Lol Crawley
- Edited by: Tom Cross
- Production company: Wild Chickens Productions
- Distributed by: Paramount Pictures
- Country: United States
- Language: English

Damien Chazelle is writing, co-producing, and directing an upcoming American prison drama film. It stars Daniel Craig, Cillian Murphy, Michelle Williams, and Mia Threapleton.

== Premise ==
Set in the 1940s, a prison warden attempts to discipline a defiant inmate within a brutal correctional system. As tensions rise, their relationship evolves into a psychological duel.

== Cast ==
- Daniel Craig as the prison warden
- Cillian Murphy as the inmate
- Michelle Williams as the prison warden's wife
- Mia Threapleton as the inmate's daughter

== Production ==
=== Development ===
In February 2024, Damien Chazelle acknowledged that he was in the process of finishing a new screenplay that he planned to direct, but remained skeptical about the amount of creative freedom he would be allowed following the box office disappointment of his previous film Babylon (2022). "I'm in a sort of trepidatious state of mind, but I have no illusions. I won't get a budget of Babylon size any time soon, or at least not on this next one," Chazelle told Ben Mankiewicz on an episode of Talking Pictures. "I have very mixed mind about it. Maybe I won't be able to get this one made. We'll have to wait and see." In April, it was reported by Deadline Hollywood that Chazelle had officially set his next film at Paramount Pictures, produced under his Wild Chickens Productions banner as part of a first-look deal with the studio that was signed in 2022. Though no plot details were disclosed at the time, sources said the film was based off an original script he wrote and would be set in a prison. Chazelle and Paramount executives expected to begin meeting with "A-list talent" for what was described as a "high-priority" project. Paramount tentatively announced during its CinemaCon presentation that the film would release in 2025.

In September 2024, Chazelle revealed that he was working on another project simultaneously as his prison drama film and wasn't entirely sure which one would move forward first. The second project was revealed to be an Evel Knievel biopic for Paramount, with Leonardo DiCaprio and Adrien Brody tentatively attached to star in the film. Chazelle pivoted towards developing the Knievel biopic since its script was written by William Monahan. In March 2025, it was announced that Chazelle had opted to prioritize Evel Knievel on Tour, with casting underway. However, DiCaprio—who was initially offered a part in the prison drama before passing in favor of Evel Knievel on Tour—ultimately opted to turn down that project too in order to prioritize another collaboration with Martin Scorsese for the film What Happens at Night.

In May 2025, Chazelle quickly circled back to the prison drama as his next film, with Daniel Craig and Cillian Murphy being cast in the lead roles. In January 2026, Michelle Williams and Mia Threapleton joined the cast.

=== Filming ===
Principal photography began in March 2026 in Greece and wrapped in June 2026. Lol Crawley served as the cinematographer.
