= Joe Anders =

American-British actor (born 2003)

- Born: Joe Alfie Winslet Mendes; December 22, 2003 (age 22); New York City, U.S.
- Education: National Film and Television School
- Occupations: Actor; screenwriter; composer
- Years active: 2019–present
- Parents: Sam Mendes (father); Kate Winslet (mother)
- Relatives: Mia Threapleton (half-sister); Valerie Mendes (grandmother); Alfred Mendes (great-grandfather)

Joe Alfie Winslet Mendes (born December 22, 2003), known professionally as Joe Anders, is an American-British actor, screenwriter and composer. He is the son of actress Kate Winslet and film director Sam Mendes, and the younger half-brother of actress Mia Threapleton. He began his career with a small part in the war drama 1917 (2019), the Channel 4 film I Am Ruth (2022) and the biographical war drama Lee (2023) before starring in the musical coming-of-age romantic comedy Bonus Track (2023). He also wrote the screenplay for the film Goodbye June (2025), his mother's directorial debut.

== Early life ==
Anders was born Joe Alfie Winslet Mendes on 22 December 2003, in New York City, to English actress Kate Winslet and film director Sam Mendes. His parents separated in 2010, when he was six years old, and divorced in 2011. His father identifies as a secular Jew. He has three half-siblings: an older half-sister from his mother's first marriage to painter-filmmaker Jim Threapleton, actress Mia Threapleton (born 2000); a younger half-brother (born 2013) from his mother's third marriage to English businessman Edward Abel Smith; and a younger half-sister (born 2017) from his father's second marriage to English trumpet player Alison Balsom. His stepfather, Edward Abel Smith, is the former head of marketing promotion and astronaut experience at Virgin Galactic and the nephew of the company's co-founder, English business mogul Richard Branson. After marrying Winslet in 2012, Abel Smith became a stay-at-home dad helping her raise her children.

His maternal grandmother worked as a nanny and waitress, and his maternal grandfather was a struggling actor who took labouring jobs to support the family. His maternal great-grandparents were both actors and ran the Reading Repertory Theatre Company. His paternal grandfather, Jameson Peter Mendes, was a Roman Catholic University professor of Portuguese descent from Trinidad and Tobago, and his paternal grandmother, novelist Valerie Mendes, is an English Jew. His paternal great-grandfather was the Trinidadian writer Alfred Mendes. He also has Irish and Swedish ancestry through his mother. His maternal five times great-grandfather, Anders Jonsson, was an agricultural slave labourer in Sweden who was arrested for stealing potatoes and honey to feed his family and died in prison from typhoid in 1832 while waiting for his appeal.

Anders grew up between New York City and England. In 2010, he relocated with his mother and half-sister from New York to England to avoid paparazzi, and since 2013 they have lived in West Wittering, Sussex.

== Career ==
=== Acting ===
In 2019, Anders made his feature film debut at the age of 15 with a small part as Private Willock in the war drama 1917, directed by his father. He was credited as "Joe Mendes" in the film.

In 2022, he changed his stage name to Joe Anders and had a small part in the Channel 4 television drama film I Am Ruth (2022), directed by Dominic Savage, appearing alongside his mother and his sister Mia, portraying their son and brother, respectively.

In 2023, Anders had a small part as an American soldier in the biographical war drama Lee, directed by Ellen Kuras, and had his first leading role in the musical coming-of-age romantic comedy Bonus Track, directed by Julia Jackman. For his performance in Bonus Track, he was longlisted for the British Independent Film Awards in the Breakthrough Performance category but did not receive a nomination.

In October 2024, Anders joined the cast of Zoe Kazan's miniseries East of Eden, adapted from John Steinbeck's 1952 novel of the same name. In May 2025, Anders joined the cast of Apple TV+'s series Cape Fear.

=== Writing and music ===
Anders is also a musician and learned how to play the piano in 2020 during the COVID-19 lockdown. In 2024, he composed the score for Mike Gilbert's short film Big Cat.

At the age of 19, Anders attended a screenwriting course at the National Film and Television School in Beaconsfield, England, where he wrote the screenplay for the British family drama film Goodbye June (2025), inspired by the death of his maternal grandmother when he was 13 years old. The film marks both Anders' screenwriting debut and Winslet's directorial debut, and was released by Netflix on 24 December 2025.

== Filmography ==
Key
†	Denotes films that have not yet been released

=== As actor ===
==== Film ====
Year	Title	Role	Notes
2019	1917	Private Willock	as Joe Mendes
2023	Lee	Frank Kleeman, American GI	
2023	Bonus Track	George Bobbin	
TBA	Black Palace †	—N/a	Post-production

==== Television ====
Year	Title	Role	Notes
2022	I Am Ruth	Billy	Television film
2026	Cape Fear	Zack Bowden	Miniseries
2026	East of Eden	Aron Trask	Miniseries

=== As screenwriter ===
Year	Title
2025	Goodbye June
