= Shadows (2020 film) =

2020 Italian thriller drama film

- Film poster
- Directed by: Carlo Lavagna
- Written by: Damiano Bruè; Fabio Mollo; Vanessa Picciarelli; Tiziana Triana
- Produced by: Andrea Paris; Matteo Rovere
- Starring: Mia Threapleton; Lola Petticrew; Saskia Reeves
- Cinematography: James Mather
- Edited by: Davide Vizzini
- Music by: Michele Braga
- Release date: 21 October 2020 (Rome)
- Running time: 100 minutes
- Country: Italy
- Language: English

Shadows is a 2020 Italian thriller drama film directed by Carlo Lavagna.

== Plot ==
Alma and Alex are two young girls living with their mother in an abandoned hotel deep within a forest. The woman raised them with the belief that humanity has vanished and that they must survive alone forever. She teaches them about medicinal plants and enforces strict rules, including a prohibition on going outside during the day—she claims the sun could kill them.

Initially, there is harmony between the girls, but as they mature and enter adolescence, they begin to question their mother's rules and their understanding of human civilization and their own sexuality, especially as Alma has her first period.

Secretly, they break into a warehouse their mother forbids them from entering. There, they discover unfamiliar objects, including a phone and a pornographic magazine, which introduce them to concepts of the male body for the first time. As days pass, Alex grows increasingly restless with their mother's control, leading to arguments with Alma, who remains more obedient. Their mother continues to cling to childhood habits, such as writing messages to intercept any surviving humans, while Alex seeks independence and connection beyond their secluded life. Tensions escalate, fueling Alma's nightmares. One morning, Alma believes Alex has left, but in reality, she is still there. Alma leaves the house during the day, provoking her mother’s anger.

In the following days, Alex convinces Alma that their mother can no longer be trusted. She urges Alma to send a "message in a bottle" into the black river—the boundary the mother forbids them from crossing. The mother intercepts them and punishes them by locking them in their room. When the door remains sealed for days, the girls team up and escape. They explore the estate, uncovering comforts their mother had hidden from them. Furious, they run away. Later, Alma regrets her decision and wants to return home, prompting an argument with Alex, who then runs off. Frightened, Alma falls and faints. Her mother finds her, treats her foot injury, and brings her back.

As days pass, Alma feels increasingly drained, and her mother becomes more repressive. Alma begins to suspect something is amiss. When she tries to swap her tea with her mother's, her mother falls into a deep sleep, giving Alma the chance to explore outside during the day. This confirms that her mother's stories are false. Upon waking, her mother confronts her, and Alma decides to leave. A fierce struggle ensues, and Alma escapes into the woods. Her mother chases her but falls into a hole, fatally pierced. Before dying, the mother guides Alma toward a path revealing the truth: there, Alma finds Alex, who rescues her from drowning and appears to know what has happened.

They discover an abandoned car, where Alma recalls an accident that happened when she was very young, remembering she was kidnapped by a woman who was not her mother. She realizes she created the alter ego Alex to cope with loneliness. This revelation leaves Alma alone, facing a society she has never truly known.

== Cast ==
- Mia Threapleton as Alma
  - Luke Harmon as Alma as a child
- Lola Petticrew as Alex
  - Julia Dillon as Alex as a child
- Saskia Reeves as Mother

== Release ==
The film premiered at Rome Film Festival, as part of the "Alice nella città" section, on 21 October 2020. It was expected to be theatrically released on 16 November 2020, but it was delayed due to the second outbreak of the COVID-19 pandemic in Italy. The film was released via pay-per-view channel Sky Primafila Premiere on 19 November 2020.
