= The Phoenician Scheme =

2025 film by Wes Anderson

- Theatrical release poster
- Directed by: Wes Anderson
- Screenplay by: Wes Anderson
- Story by: Wes Anderson; Roman Coppola
- Produced by: Wes Anderson; Steven Rales; Jeremy Dawson; John Peet
- Starring: Benicio del Toro; Mia Threapleton; Michael Cera; Riz Ahmed; Tom Hanks; Bryan Cranston; Mathieu Amalric; Richard Ayoade; Jeffrey Wright; Scarlett Johansson; Benedict Cumberbatch; Rupert Friend; Hope Davis
- Cinematography: Bruno Delbonnel
- Edited by: Barney Pilling
- Music by: Alexandre Desplat
- Production companies: Indian Paintbrush; American Empirical Pictures
- Distributed by: Focus Features (United States); Universal Pictures (international)
- Release dates: May 18, 2025 (Cannes); May 29, 2025 (Germany); May 30, 2025 (United States)
- Running time: 101 minutes
- Countries: United States; Germany
- Language: English
- Budget: $30 million
- Box office: $40 million

The Phoenician Scheme is a 2025 black comedy espionage thriller film written, produced, and directed by Wes Anderson from a story he conceived with Roman Coppola. The film features an ensemble cast that includes Benicio del Toro, Mia Threapleton, Michael Cera, Riz Ahmed, Tom Hanks, Bryan Cranston, Mathieu Amalric, Richard Ayoade, Jeffrey Wright, Scarlett Johansson, Benedict Cumberbatch, Rupert Friend, Hope Davis, F. Murray Abraham, Charlotte Gainsbourg, Willem Dafoe, and Bill Murray. It tells the story of a ruthless businessman (del Toro) as he seeks to reconcile with his estranged daughter (Threapleton) and complete an ambitious infrastructure project in Phoenicia. The film was produced internationally between the United States and Germany by Anderson's company American Empirical Pictures and Steven Rales's company Indian Paintbrush.

Anderson talked about the film in June 2023 while promoting Asteroid City; he said it had already been written before the 2023 WGA strike began. That September, he revealed that del Toro and Cera were planned to join the cast, and he hoped to begin filming soon after the 2023 SAG-AFTRA strike ended. The rest of the cast signed on between January and June 2024. Filming took place at Babelsberg Studio in Germany, between March and June 2024, with cinematographer Bruno Delbonnel. Frequent Anderson collaborator Alexandre Desplat returned to compose the score.

The Phoenician Scheme had its world premiere in the main competition of the Cannes Film Festival on May 18, 2025, and was released theatrically in Germany by Universal Pictures on May 29, 2025, and in the United States by Focus Features on May 30, 2025. The film received generally positive reviews.

== Plot ==
In 1950, stateless arms dealer and industrialist Anatole "Zsa-Zsa" Korda narrowly survives a sixth assassination attempt. Knowing he cannot run forever, Korda tries to mend his relationship with his only daughter, Catholic novice Sister Liesl, and enrolls her in his ambitious scheme to overhaul the infrastructure of Phoenicia using slave labor. A consortium of governments around the world, seeking to curb Korda's tendency to manipulate global conflict and peace to suit his own interests, conspires to drive up the price of building materials, jeopardizing the project's financing and threatening to bankrupt Korda.

With Liesl and Bjørn, a Norwegian entomologist and administrative assistant in tow, Korda travels to meet and attempt to swindle his major partners. He deceitfully asks Californians Leland and Reagan to sign a contract increasing their investment, blackmails French gangster Marseille Bob, and threatens East Coast businessman Marty with a suicide bombing. The partners are enraged but all ultimately agree to contribute, though they only manage to cover 50% of the budget shortfall.

During the trip, Korda has several visions of the afterlife. A divine court judges his worthiness to enter Heaven, and Liesl's deceased mother reveals that he is not Liesl's father. He realizes that all he had to offer his family was money, not love. In addition, he confesses to Liesl his guilt in contributing to the death of her mother, who was murdered by his estranged half-brother Nubar, with whom she was having an affair. Liesl is outraged at her father's amorality but agrees to continue helping him, hoping that he might change his ways and Nubar would face justice.

In a last-ditch attempt to avoid asking Nubar for help, Korda offers to marry his cousin Hilda, an heiress to the Korda armaments fortune. She accepts his proposal but refuses to increase her investment. Korda's plane is destroyed by saboteurs on the way home, and in the aftermath Bjørn is unmasked as a spy working for the government consortium. However, having fallen in love with Liesl, Bjørn agrees to switch sides. Liesl resolves to return to the convent, but her mother superior dismisses her, explaining that she is not cut out for religious life.

Korda, Liesl, and Bjørn finally meet with Nubar, who denies being Liesl's real father and announces that he is withdrawing his entire investment. Having failed to meet the budget shortfall, Korda throws his entire personal fortune into the Phoenician scheme, reasoning that finishing a worthy project will give his life meaning. He also decides to pay his workers and convert to Catholicism. The investors gather at the Desert Oasis Palace hotel to witness a presentation of the scheme. Nubar returns, reveals that he was behind the attempts on Korda's life over a long-held grudge, and tries to personally murder Korda. Korda fatally wounds him before Nubar blows himself up with a grenade.

Liesl reconciles with a bankrupted Korda and agrees to accept him as her father. The two retire to a simpler life running a small bistro. Hilda has her brief marriage to Korda annulled and gives back her wedding ring. Korda loans the ring to Bjørn, who proposes to Liesl; she accepts. At the end of the working day, Liesl and Korda play cards together as a family.

== Cast ==
- Benicio del Toro as Anatole "Zsa-Zsa" Korda, a ruthless yet charismatic business tycoon, inspired in part by Armenian oil magnate Calouste Gulbenkian
- Mia Threapleton as Sister Liesl, Korda's daughter and a nun
  - Beatrice Campbell as young Liesl
- Michael Cera as Bjørn Lund / Bjørn Karlsen, a Norwegian entomologist, tutor, and Korda's administrative assistant
- Riz Ahmed as Prince Farouk, the crown prince of Phoenicia
- Tom Hanks as Leland, a mistrustful Korda investor from Sacramento
- Bryan Cranston as Reagan, Leland's grouchy brother and business partner
- Mathieu Amalric as Marseille Bob, a gangster, nightclub owner, and Korda investor
- Richard Ayoade as Sergio, a revolutionary guerilla
- Jeffrey Wright as Marty, a Korda investor from Newark
- Scarlett Johansson as Cousin Hilda Sussman-Korda, Korda's second cousin and prospective wife
- Benedict Cumberbatch as Uncle Nubar Korda, Korda's estranged half-brother
- Rupert Friend as Excalibur, a government agent charged with destroying Korda's business empire
- Hope Davis as Mother Superior, Liesl's boss at the convent
- Alex Jennings as Broadcloth, Korda's butler
- Stephen Park as Korda's pilot
- F. Murray Abraham as a prophet who speaks at Korda's heavenly funeral
- Charlotte Gainsbourg as Korda's first wife
- Willem Dafoe as Knave, Korda's heavenly defense attorney
- Bill Murray as God
- Jason Watkins as the notary, Korda's attorney

Other actors in the film include Scott Shepherd as a field reporter, Donald Sumpter as the US government chairman, Tonio Arango as the desert assassin, Stéphane Bak and Aysha Joy Samuel as Radical Freedom militants, and Karl Markovics as a hermit.

== Production ==
=== Development ===
Anderson decided to write a story about the Near East after the death of his father-in-law, Lebanese engineer Fouad Malouf, to whom the film is dedicated. Anderson remembered Malouf as "an amazing kind of larger-than-life figure ... wise and very intelligent, but a little bit scary." He wanted to make a movie where a father "realizes that actually his giant business plan is a ritual, a scheme to get [his daughter]." When Malouf's health began failing, he showed Anderson's wife a series of shoeboxes he had used to organize his files and memories. Anderson adapted the shoeboxes for his film, where Zsa-Zsa Korda uses shoeboxes to organize his business plans.

For the character of Zsa-Zsa, Anderson drew on real-life industrialists of the period, saying that he wanted a character who could have "walked out of an Antonioni movie with his sunglasses." Zsa-Zsa's lavish palazzo, fondness for art collecting, and nickname "Mr. Five Percent", are borrowed from Armenian oil magnate Calouste Gulbenkian. In addition, the name, look, and British manner of Zsa-Zsa's brother Nubar are borrowed from Gulbenkian's son Nubar Gulbenkian. (Another influence for Nubar may be the title character of the 1955 film Mr. Arkadin.) Anderson mentioned businessmen Aristotle Onassis, Stavros Niarchos, Gianni Agnelli, and William Randolph Hearst as additional influences. The mechanical diorama that features at the climax of the film references The Rules of the Game (1939), another film lampooning the rich and marking the end of an era for the European elite.

Anderson chose to focus the film on religion, while admitting that he personally believed only "roughly" in God. He explained that his high school had Episcopal influences and that "if you grow up being given this religion, it's sort of always there". The film's afterlife sequences have been compared to Powell and Pressburger's film A Matter of Life and Death (1946), and the surname Korda may be a reference to the Hungarian-British filmmaker Alexander Korda, who produced many Powell and Pressburger films, though not A Matter of Life and Death itself. The film's religious sequences were also inspired by Luis Buñuel.

Anderson's longtime collaborating producer Steven Rales and his company Indian Paintbrush produced the film. Alexandre Desplat returned to compose the score, his seventh collaboration with Anderson.

=== Casting ===
In May 2023, Michael Cera and Benicio del Toro were the first cast members rumored to be part of Wes Anderson's next film. Anderson first talked about the film in June 2023 while promoting Asteroid City, calling it a "three-hander" adventure and saying that it had already been written before the 2023 WGA strike began, working with Roman Coppola. He confirmed del Toro's involvement saying that the film would feature him in every shot, and that it involved a father-daughter relationship in a dark espionage tale. He later said that del Toro was the only actor considered for the role. In September 2023, Anderson confirmed that Cera was planned to feature alongside del Toro in the film, and he hoped to begin filming soon after the 2023 SAG-AFTRA strike was over. Bill Murray joined the cast in January 2024. Riz Ahmed was announced as part of the cast in April 2024. In May 2024, Screen Rant reported that F. Murray Abraham joined the cast.

The rest of the cast was announced on June 6, 2024, including Tom Hanks, Benedict Cumberbatch, Scarlett Johansson, Willem Dafoe, Bryan Cranston, Mia Threapleton, Tonio Arango, Imke Büchel, Imad Mardnli, Jaime Ferkic, Antonia Desplat, Aysha Samuel, and Sabine Hollweck. With the announcement of the release date, it was revealed in February 2025 that Mathieu Amalric and Jeffrey Wright were part of the cast.

Threapleton had been a fan of Anderson since she watched Fantastic Mr. Fox (2009) when she was eight or nine years old. When she was thirteen, she wrote on her journal, "Watching Moonrise Kingdom (2012) again, bloody love this film. Would love to work with Wes Anderson one day." She landed the role of Sister Liesl after a long audition process that began in May 2023, when she sent Anderson a self-shot audition tape without knowing anything about the character that she would portray. Her tape stood out among over a thousand of auditions that Anderson had watched at that point, "She just seemed like she was in a documentary about the scene. I could see her thoughts. You could tell she was really listening, reacting, thinking about what was happening in front of her. Which isn't always the case", he said. Anderson then asked her to meet with him in London and later for a reading and two-day screen test with del Toro. Both Anderson and del Toro (who plays her character's father in the film) agreed that she should be cast for the role. Del Toro, who endorsed Threapleton after their first reading together, said, "When she walked out, I remember telling Wes, 'I think she can go toe to toe; she might be short, but she's terrific'". Anderson said that Threapleton already had the role five minutes into the second day of screen test. "And when you saw her read against Benicio... I mean, he's a very imposing figure, and about a foot-and-a-half taller than Mia, for one thing. But if you were to say who seemed to have the power in the relationship in the scenes, you would tend to lean towards the nun." Anderson said he only discovered that Threapleton is Kate Winslet's daughter after he had watched her audition video a few times and then looked her up to check her previous work.

To prepare for her role as a nun, Threapleton, who is not Catholic, talked to a Deacon and studied Catholicism in Rome with the help of the film's costume designer, Milena Canonero, who is based out of Rome.

=== Filming ===
Principal photography began on March 12, 2024, at Babelsberg Studio in Germany, and wrapped on June 3 of the same year. The film was shot using Arricams and an Arriflex 235 with Kodak film stock. Color correction was done by Company3 UK. Anderson, who avoids the usage of chroma key, used an LED screen for the cloud footage outside the plane.

French cinematographer Bruno Delbonnel shot on 35 mm film, marking his first feature-length collaboration with Anderson. This was the first live-action film to not be shot by his regular cinematographer Robert Yeoman. The film used the unusual 1.5:1 aspect ratio.

==== Artwork ====
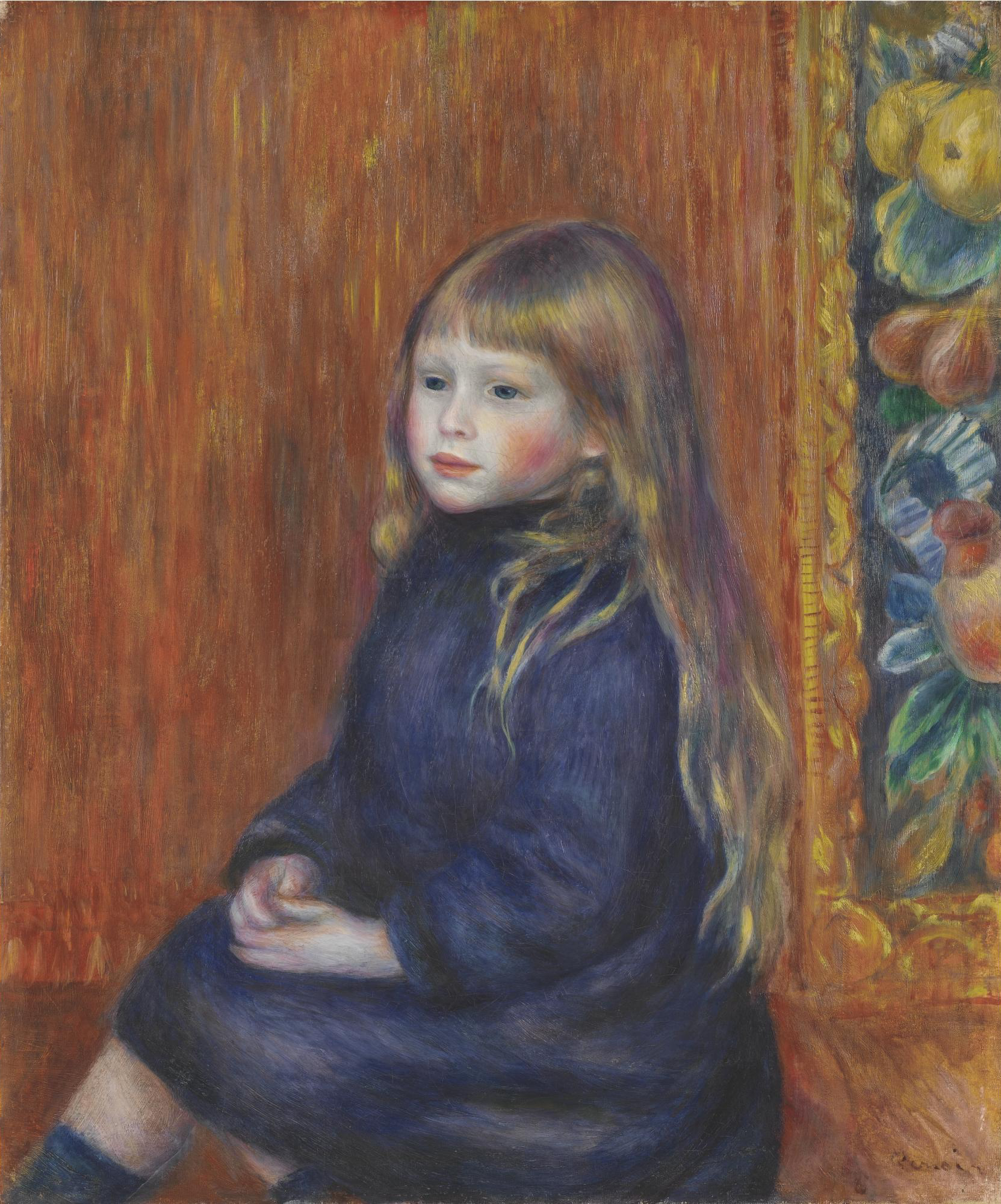
Pierre-Auguste Renoir's Enfant Assis en Robe Bleue was loaned to the production.

Anderson used several real-life paintings as props, including Renoir's Enfant Assis en Robe Bleue, once owned by Greta Garbo, and Magritte's The Equator from the collection of the Berlin State Museums. A few paintings from the Hamburger Kunsthalle also appear, among them one by Floris van Schooten and one by Juriaen Jacobsze. However, some of the paintings used in the film were replicas, including a Rubens.

Jasper Sharp, a historian and curator at the Kunsthistorisches Museum in Vienna, curated and sourced the authentic artworks used in the film.

== Release ==
In February 2025, Focus Features acquired worldwide rights to the film, with its parent Universal Pictures handling international distribution. The film competed for the Palme d'Or at the 2025 Cannes Film Festival, where it had its world premiere on May 18. The Phoenician Scheme was released theatrically in Germany by Universal Pictures on May 29, 2025, and had a limited theatrical release in the United States on May 30, 2025, before expanding nationwide on June 6, 2025.

== Reception ==
=== Box office ===
As of July 30, 2025, The Phoenician Scheme has grossed $20 million in the United States and Canada, and $19 million in other territories, for a worldwide total of $39 million.

=== Critical response ===
On the review aggregator website Rotten Tomatoes, 77% of 303 critics' reviews are positive, with an average rating of 6.8/10. The website's consensus reads: "A caper made with all the intricacy of a Rube Goldberg machine, The Phoenician Scheme doesn't deviate from Wes Anderson's increasingly ornate style but delivers the formula with mannered delicacy." Metacritic, which uses a weighted average, assigned the film a score of 70 out of 100, based on 53 critics, indicating "generally favorable" reviews. Audiences polled by CinemaScore gave the film an average grade of "B-" on an A+ to F scale, while those surveyed by PostTrak gave it an 81% positive score, with 62% saying they would definitely recommend it.

Tim Grierson of ScreenDaily wrote that while the film "is transporting", "the narrative proves to be fussy rather than delightful." William Bibbiani of TheWrap declared the film "a serious work of art that plays like a boondoggle." Davide Abbatescianni of Cineuropa billed it "another elegant yet forgettable chapter in Anderson's filmography," which "ticks the boxes of visual and narrative quirkiness without delivering any substance."

=== Accolades ===
Institution	Date of ceremony	Category	Recipient(s)	Result	Ref.
Artios Awards	February 26, 2026	Feature Big Budget – Comedy	Douglas Aibel, Jina Jay, and Alexandra Montag	Nominated	
Astra Creative Arts Awards	December 11, 2025	Best Production Design	Adam Stockhausen and Anna Pinnock	Nominated	
Cannes Film Festival	May 24, 2025	Palme d'Or	Wes Anderson	Nominated	
Critics' Choice Movie Awards	January 4, 2026	Best Comedy	The Phoenician Scheme	Nominated	
Florida Film Critics Circle	December 19, 2025	Best Supporting Actress	Mia Threapleton	Nominated	
Florida Film Critics Circle	December 19, 2025	Best Production Design & Art Direction	Adam Stockhausen and Anna Pinnock	Nominated	
Seattle Film Critics Society	December 15, 2025	Best Costume Design	Milena Canonero	Nominated	
Seattle Film Critics Society	December 15, 2025	Best Production Design	Adam Stockhausen and Anna Pinnock	Nominated	
Variety + Golden Globes Vanguard Awards	May 17, 2025	Breakout Artist	Mia Threapleton	Won	

== Works cited ==
- Rizov, Vadim (2025). "Order of Operations". Filmmaker. Vol. 33, no. 4. The Gotham Film & Media Institute.
