= Sam Mendes's unrealised projects =

During his long career, British film director Sam Mendes has worked on many projects that never progressed beyond the pre-production stage under his direction. Some of these projects fell into development hell, were officially cancelled, were in development limbo or would see life under a different production team.

== 1990s ==
=== Chicago ===
Mendes was among several directors approached during the 1990s to direct a film version of Bob Fosse's Broadway musical Chicago, which would eventually be directed by Rob Marshall.

=== The Lookout ===
Mendes became attached to direct Scott Frank's screenplay The Lookout before the release of American Beauty, but left the project to direct Road to Perdition. Frank ultimately directed the film himself.

=== The Prestige ===
Mendes wanted to direct The Prestige as his follow-up to American Beauty which had just been nominated for eight Academy Awards. Another offer came from Newmarket Films on behalf of Christopher Nolan, of whom author Christopher Priest had never heard. Priest was ready to finalize the deal with Mendes when he received a copy of Nolan's Following. Impressed, Priest chose Nolan over Mendes.

== 2000s ==
=== Sex, Surrealism, Dalí and Me ===
In June 2000, reports emerged that Mendes was said to be interested in making a film of Sex, Surrealism, Dalí and Me: The Memoirs of Carlos Lozano by Clifford Thurlow, about Lozano's relationship with artist Salvador Dalí.

=== The Kite Runner ===
Mendes was attached to direct the film adaptation of the 2003 novel The Kite Runner by Khaled Hosseini, but in April 2004 the project was pushed back after Mendes signed on to direct Jarhead. In 2005, Marc Forster took over the project as director, with Mendes becoming an executive producer; the film was eventually released on 14 December 2007.

=== American Prometheus ===
In 2005, following its publication, Mendes optioned the rights to adapt the J. Robert Oppenheimer biography American Prometheus by Kai Bird and Martin J. Sherwin. In 2007, it was reported that Jeffrey Hatcher was writing the film for Mendes, with the project set up at DreamWorks Pictures. However, Mendes ultimately did not move forward with the project. The book would eventually be adapted as the film Oppenheimer, written and directed by Christopher Nolan and released in theatres on 21 July 2023 by Universal Pictures.

=== Middlemarch ===
In April 2007, it was reported that Mendes would direct a film adaptation of the George Eliot novel Middlemarch, to be adapted by Andrew Davies, who had previously written the 1994 miniseries adaptation of the novel; production was expected to begin in 2008. In June 2009, it was announced that the project had been acquired by Focus Features, as part of a two-year first-look deal between Focus and Mendes's Neal Street Productions.

=== Preacher ===
In October 2008, it was announced that Mendes would direct a film adaptation of the supernatural comic book series Preacher, created by Garth Ennis and Steve Dillon, for Columbia Pictures, with Neal H. Moritz and Jason Netter producing. In January 2009, it was announced that John August would write the screenplay for the project. In April 2010, Moritz revealed that Mendes had left the project to direct the James Bond film Skyfall.

=== Butcher's Crossing ===
In June 2009, it was reported that Mendes would produce a film adaptation of the 1960 western novel Butcher's Crossing by John Edward Williams for Focus Features, with Mendes eyeing the project as a potential directing vehicle. In December, it was announced that Joe Penhall would write the screenplay. The project did not move forward. The adaptation would eventually be directed and co-written by Gabe Polsky and released in theatres by Saban Films on 20 October 2023, without the involvement of Mendes or Penhall.

=== Netherland ===
In August 2009, it was announced that Mendes's Neal Street Productions would collaborate with Harpo Films to produce a film adaptation of Joseph O'Neill's novel Netherland, with Mendes eyeing the project as a potential directing vehicle and Christopher Hampton writing the screenplay. By September, it was reported that Focus Features had come aboard the project.

== 2010s ==
=== On Chesil Beach ===
In June 2010, it was announced that Mendes would direct a film adaptation of Ian McEwan's 2007 novella On Chesil Beach for Focus Features, with McEwan adapting his own work and Carey Mulligan to star as the female lead; Mendes would also set to produce the project through Neal Street Productions. In November 2011, it was reported that Mike Newell would be replacing Mendes as director, with Mendes now only producing the project, and production expected to begin in the summer of 2012. The film would ultimately be directed by Dominic Cooke and star Saoirse Ronan, with Mendes no longer involved, and premiered at the 2017 Toronto International Film Festival on 7 September 2017.

=== The Voyeur's Motel ===
In April 2016, it was announced that DreamWorks Pictures had acquired the film rights to the Gay Talese novel and article The Voyeur's Motel, with Mendes directing and producing. In November, the project was scrapped despite a draft being produced by Krysty Wilson-Cairns, after Mendes became aware of the documentary Voyeur and watched a cut with Wilson-Cairns.

=== James and the Giant Peach ===
In August 2016, it was announced that Mendes had entered talks to direct a live-action adaptation of the Roald Dahl novel James and the Giant Peach for Walt Disney Pictures, with Nick Hornby in talks to write the screenplay. The film marked Disney's second film adaptation of the novel after the 1996 animated film adaptation directed by Henry Selick. In May 2017, it was announced that Mendes was no longer involved with the project, choosing instead to direct Disney's live-action Pinocchio instead.

=== Beautiful Ruins ===
In September 2016, it was announced that Mendes would produce and potentially direct a film adaptation of Jess Walter's 2012 novel Beautiful Ruins for Fox 2000 Pictures, with Noah Harpster and Micah Fitzerman-Blue writing the screenplay. By April 2018, Mendes had stepped down as director and would instead serve as producer, with David Frankel entering talks to direct the project. By June 2020, the project had moved to Amblin Partners with Niki Caro now directing, with Mark Hammer and Chiara Atik writing, and Mendes remaining involved as a producer.

=== My Favorite Thing Is Monsters ===
In April 2017, it was announced that Mendes was in talks to produce and possibly direct the film adaptation of the Emil Ferris graphic novel My Favorite Thing Is Monsters for Sony Pictures.

=== Pinocchio remake ===
In May 2017, it was announced that after out of directing James and the Giant Peach, Mendes had entered talks to direct a live-action remake of the 1940 animated film Pinocchio for Walt Disney Pictures, with Chris Weitz writing the screenplay. Mendes exited the project in November. The film was eventually directed by Robert Zemeckis and released on Disney+ on September 8, 2022.

== 2020s ==
=== Hamnet ===
In early 2023, according to an issue of Production Weekly, Mendes was to direct Tom Holland in an adaptation of Maggie O'Farrell's historical fiction novel Hamnet, with the screenplay being written by Chiara Atik. By the following year, Chloé Zhao was named as director of Hamnet, with Mendes stepping in as producer.

== Offers ==
=== Oz the Great and Powerful ===
In April 2010, it was reported that Mendes was being courted to direct Oz the Great and Powerful for Walt Disney Pictures, with Robert Downey Jr. also considering taking on the lead role at the time. However, in June Sam Raimi entered talks to direct the project instead, and was committed to the film by October; the film was ultimately released on 8 March 2013, with James Franco playing the Wizard.

=== The Hunger Games ===
In September 2010, Deadline Hollywood reported that Mendes was one of the three initial favourites to direct the film adaptation of The Hunger Games for Lionsgate Studios, alongside David Slade and Gary Ross. Ross was ultimately selected to direct the film, which was released in theatres on 23 March 2012.
