= Goodbye June (film) =

2025 film by Kate Winslet

- Release poster
- Directed by: Kate Winslet
- Written by: Joe Anders
- Produced by: Kate Winslet; Kate Solomon
- Starring: Toni Collette; Johnny Flynn; Andrea Riseborough; Timothy Spall; Kate Winslet; Helen Mirren
- Cinematography: Alwin Küchler
- Edited by: Lucia Zucchetti
- Music by: Ben Harlan
- Production company: 55 Jugglers
- Distributed by: Netflix
- Release dates: 3 December 2025 (Curzon Mayfair Cinema); 12 December 2025 (United Kingdom and United States); 24 December 2025 (Netflix)
- Running time: 114 minutes
- Countries: United Kingdom; United States
- Language: English

Goodbye June is a 2025 Christmas family drama film directed by Kate Winslet in her directorial debut, from a screenplay written by her son, Joe Anders. It stars an ensemble cast that includes Toni Collette, Johnny Flynn, Andrea Riseborough, Timothy Spall, Helen Mirren, and Winslet herself. The film is set during Christmas, in which the characters gather around their dying mother, and confront themes of grief, reconciliation, and love.

Winslet explained that she had not initially intended to direct, but after reading Anders' script she decided to take on the role of director as well as actor and producer. She emphasised the therapeutic nature of the story, describing it as "about family, not just about death". Winslet selected several department heads who were newcomers, including composer Ben Harlan, production designer Alison Harvey, and costume designer Grace Clark, reflecting her desire to give opportunities to emerging talent. She also adopted unconventional filming methods, such as using small microphones on actors instead of traditional boom equipment, to create a more intimate atmosphere on set.

Goodbye June was released in select theatres in the United Kingdom and United States on 12 December 2025, and began streaming on Netflix on 24 December.

== Plot ==
Elderly June Cheshire, who has been fighting cancer for over three years, lives with her husband, Bernie, and their son, Connor. Two weeks before Christmas, June collapses at home; Connor finds her on the floor and screams out to Bernie, who distractedly leaves the water running in the bathroom when he rushes downstairs. An ambulance takes June to hospital, and Connor drives Bernie there. Connor contacts his sisters Julia and Molly, who live nearby, and they arrive shortly after. June's eldest daughter, Helen, who is living in Germany, flies back to England to be with the family.

June's doctors inform the family that her cancer has progressed so rapidly she may not even live until Christmas. As everyone struggles to come to terms with this, it becomes apparent that the Cheshire family is dysfunctional: Julia and Molly cannot be in the same room without arguing, Connor is sensitive but lacks direction, and Helen has distanced herself physically and emotionally, choosing a spiritual life abroad. As for Bernie, he mostly stays quiet and suppresses his emotions.

When Connor and Bernie return home the first night, the house is flooded with water dripping through the ceiling. After an argument between Julia and Molly, it is agreed that June, Bernie, Connor and Helen will all stay at Julia's house, which is bigger than Molly's. The next morning, however, June tells them she prefers to stay at the hospital. Molly insists she and Julia follow a strict schedule so that they do not visit June at the same time, thereby avoiding fights in her presence.

As the days pass, June's health worsens, but she enjoys spending time with all the family, including her numerous grandchildren. Helen, who is expecting for the first time and will be a single mother, is upset that June will not be there to help her raise her child. Connor befriends June's nurse, Angeli. Bernie visits June regularly, but hardly speaks to her and seems oblivious to what is happening around him.

One evening, while watching snow fall outside, June tells Julia she hopes she will come back as snow so that she can see them all at Christmastime. Julia, whom June sees as the strong one in the family, promises to look after Bernie and all the others.

June tells Angeli she wishes Julia and Molly would make amends, knowing they love each other at heart. She conspires with him to get them both to the hospital at the same time and forces them into a situation where they eventually discuss their differences and reconnect.

One night, Connor berates his father for his behaviour, asking him whether he even loves June any more. Hurt, Bernie leaves the hospital; Connor later finds him at his pub, singing a karaoke song to June. They make up, and Connor takes Bernie back to the hospital to tell June how he feels.

Realising that June is going to pass away before Christmas, Bernie gets the family together to celebrate it early; they put on a nativity show for her in the hospital. In the middle of the play, June dies. Angeli stands at a respectful distance and watches as the family share in their grief; he briefly catches Connor's eye.

One year later, the family celebrate another Christmas together. Helen has given birth, and Connor and Angeli are seen sharing a kiss. As Bernie calls on everyone to toast June, whose chair at the other end of the table is empty, June's voice is heard narrating a letter, which she wrote to Helen's unborn child while in hospital, telling them she had a wonderful life simply by being a part of the family. Two of the youngest children run to the window and watch the snow fall.

== Cast ==
- Helen Mirren as June Cheshire, Bernie's wife; Helen, Julia, Molly and Connor's mother; Benji's grandmother
- Kate Winslet as Julia Cheshire, June and Bernie's second daughter
- Andrea Riseborough as Molly Cheshire, June and Bernie's third daughter
- Toni Collette as Helen Cheshire, June and Bernie's first daughter
- Johnny Flynn as Connor Cheshire, June and Bernie's son
- Timothy Spall as Bernie Cheshire, June's husband
- Fisayo Akinade as Nurse Angeli
- Jeremy Swift as Dr David Titford
- Raza Jaffrey as Dr Simon Khal
- Stephen Merchant as Jerry, Molly's husband
- Benjamin Shortland as Benji, Julia's son

== Production ==
=== Development ===
Goodbye June is Kate Winslet's feature-length directorial debut. Winslet also served as producer with Kate Solomon, while Winslet's son, Joe Anders, wrote the screenplay. The premise of the film was inspired by Winslet's personal experience of the death of her mother to ovarian cancer in 2017. Anders wrote the screenplay at the age of 19 when he attended a screenwriting course at the National Film and Television School in Beaconsfield, England. Winslet explained that Anders "was encouraged by a wonderful tutor to write about something that he knew. Whilst it is not autobiographical in any way, [Anders] took the scenario that he had been around when my own mother passed away."

Additionally, Winslet appears in the film alongside an ensemble cast that includes Toni Collette, Johnny Flynn, Andrea Riseborough, Timothy Spall, and Helen Mirren.

=== Filming ===
Principal photography began on 17 March 2025 in the United Kingdom. Goodbye June was filmed over the course of 35 days with a small crew and a limited budget.

== Release ==
Goodbye June was released in select theatres in the United Kingdom and United States on 12 December 2025, and began streaming on Netflix on 24 December.

== Reception ==
=== Critical response ===
On the review aggregator website Rotten Tomatoes, 64% of 90 critics' reviews are positive, with an average rating of 6.1/10. The website's consensus reads: "A family affair both on screen and behind the camera, Kate Winslet's directorial debut stacks the deck for tears a little too lopsidedly, but honest performances help put this drama's heart firmly in the right place." Metacritic, which uses a weighted average, assigned the film a score of 54 out of 100, based on 27 critics, indicating "mixed or average" reviews.

Peter Bradshaw of The Guardian wrote that the film is "a well-intentioned and starrily cast yuletide heartwarmer, like a two-hour John Lewis Christmas TV ad without the logo", but criticised its "treacly soup of sentimentality" and "cartoony quasi-Richard Curtis characterisation" that felt unreal.

=== Accolades ===
| Award | Date of ceremony | Category | Recipient | Result | Ref. |
|---|---|---|---|---|---|
| AARP Movies for Grownups Awards | 10 January 2026 | Best Supporting Actress | Helen Mirren | Nominated | |
| National Film Awards | 1 July 2026 | Best Drama | Goodbye June | Nominated | |
| National Film Awards | 1 July 2026 | Best Supporting Actress | Kate Winslet | Won | |
| Women Film Critics Circle | 18 December 2025 | Best Supporting Actress | Andrea Riseborough | Runner-up | |
