= Olivia Hamilton =

American actress and producer (born 1987)

- Hamilton in 2026
- Born: June 3, 1987 (age 39)
- Citizenship: United States
- Education: Princeton University
- Occupations: Actress; producer; screenwriter
- Years active: 2011–present
- Spouse: Damien Chazelle (m. 2018)
- Children: 2

Olivia Hamilton (born June 3, 1987) is an American actress and producer. She is best known for her roles in the films La La Land (2016), First Man (2018) and Babylon (2022), all of which were directed by her husband, Damien Chazelle. (Note: Attributed to multiple references:)

In 2013, she founded the PLAY initiative, an organization dedicated to encouraging and injecting more fun and playfulness into people's lives while reconnecting them with their inner child. According to the foundation's website, PLAY is a two-hour guided experience.

Hamilton is also president of the Women's Foundation of California Board of Directors.

== Education ==
A former McKinsey & Company consultant and employee of Goldman Sachs, Hamilton is a graduate of Princeton University where she received a bachelor's degree in economics and finance. She also worked at GuideVine Technologies for over two years. "I studied economics in college because I knew I was good at it, and I wanted to be a 4.0 student, so I only took classes that were subjective where I could guarantee an 'A'. I do love economics, but I sort of had a midlife crisis, and decided to quit my job in New York and study acting. It was like a 'leap and net will appear' moment," Hamilton told WWD.

== Personal life ==
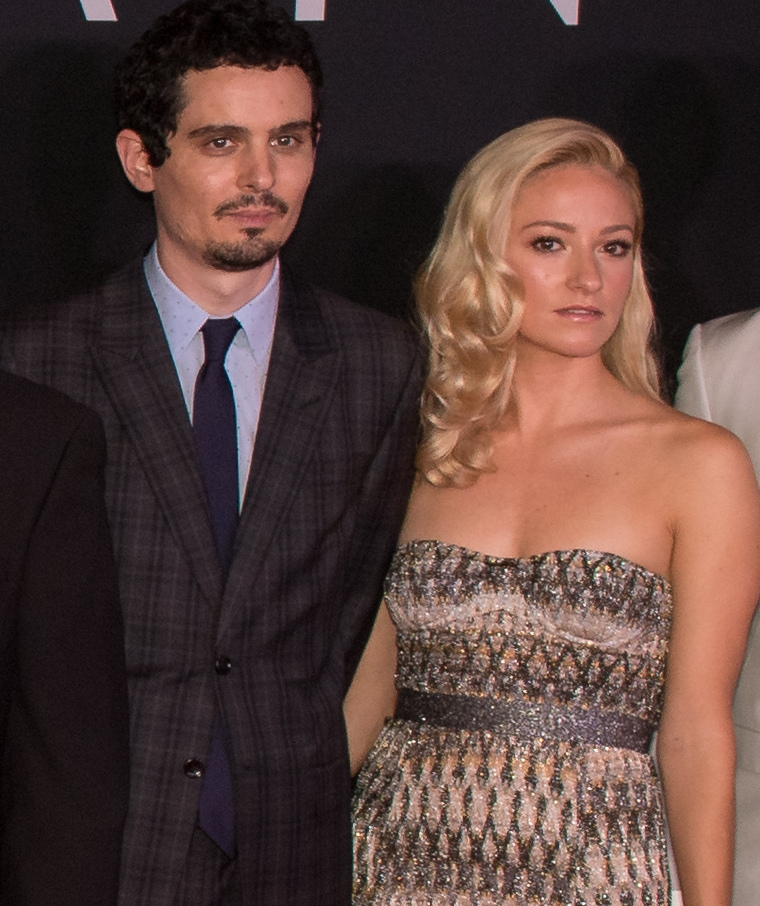
Chazelle and Hamilton in 2018

Hamilton is of Scottish-Irish ancestry and married to American filmmaker Damien Chazelle. The couple announced their engagement on October 9, 2017, and married on September 22, 2018, in Malibu, California. The two have a son who was born in November 2019. Their second child was born in December 2022.

== Career expansion ==
In December 2022, Hamilton and Chazelle signed a first-look deal with Paramount Pictures. This deal includes the upcoming release of an untitled film that is being written and directed by Chazelle, and produced by the couple through their Wild Chickens banner. They are also producing multiple films at the studio, including Heart of the Beast (2026).

== Filmography ==
=== Film ===
Key
| † | Denotes films that have not yet been released |

| Year | Title | Role | Note(s) |
|---|---|---|---|
| 2016 | La La Land | Bree | a.k.a. the Gluten Free Girl |
| 2016 | Surrogate | Liz | Short film Also director, producer, and writer |
| 2016 | The Beard | Ameilia | Short film |
| 2017 | Playground | Beth | Short film |
| 2018 | Don't Worry, He Won't Get Far on Foot | Nurse Lilly | |
| 2018 | First Man | Pat White | |
| 2019 | Justine | Maddie | |
| 2020 | Hold Fast, Good Luck | Laura | |
| 2020 | The Truth About Santa Claus | Sasha | |
| 2021 | Private View | Expectant Mother | Short film |
| 2022 | Babylon | Ruth Adler | Also producer |
| 2026 | Heart of the Beast † | — | Post-production; producer |
| TBA | The Pillar Method † | Iris | Short film (completed) |
| TBA | Tale on Emerald Trail † | Deanna | Post-production |
| TBA | Untitled Damien Chazelle film † | — | Post-production; producer |

=== Television ===
| Year | Title | Role | Note(s) |
|---|---|---|---|
| 2011 | Dinosaur Train | Lily Lambeosaurus (voice) | Episode: "Haunted Roundhouse/Big Pond Pumpkin Patch" |
| 2016–2017 | Facetiming with Mommy | Bella | Also creator, producer, and writer |
| 2016 | The Last Tycoon | Ashley | Episode: "Pilot" |

== Accolades ==
- Nominated—Actor Award for Outstanding Performance by a Cast in a Motion Picture for Babylon (2023)
