= Mia Threapleton =

English actress (born 2000)

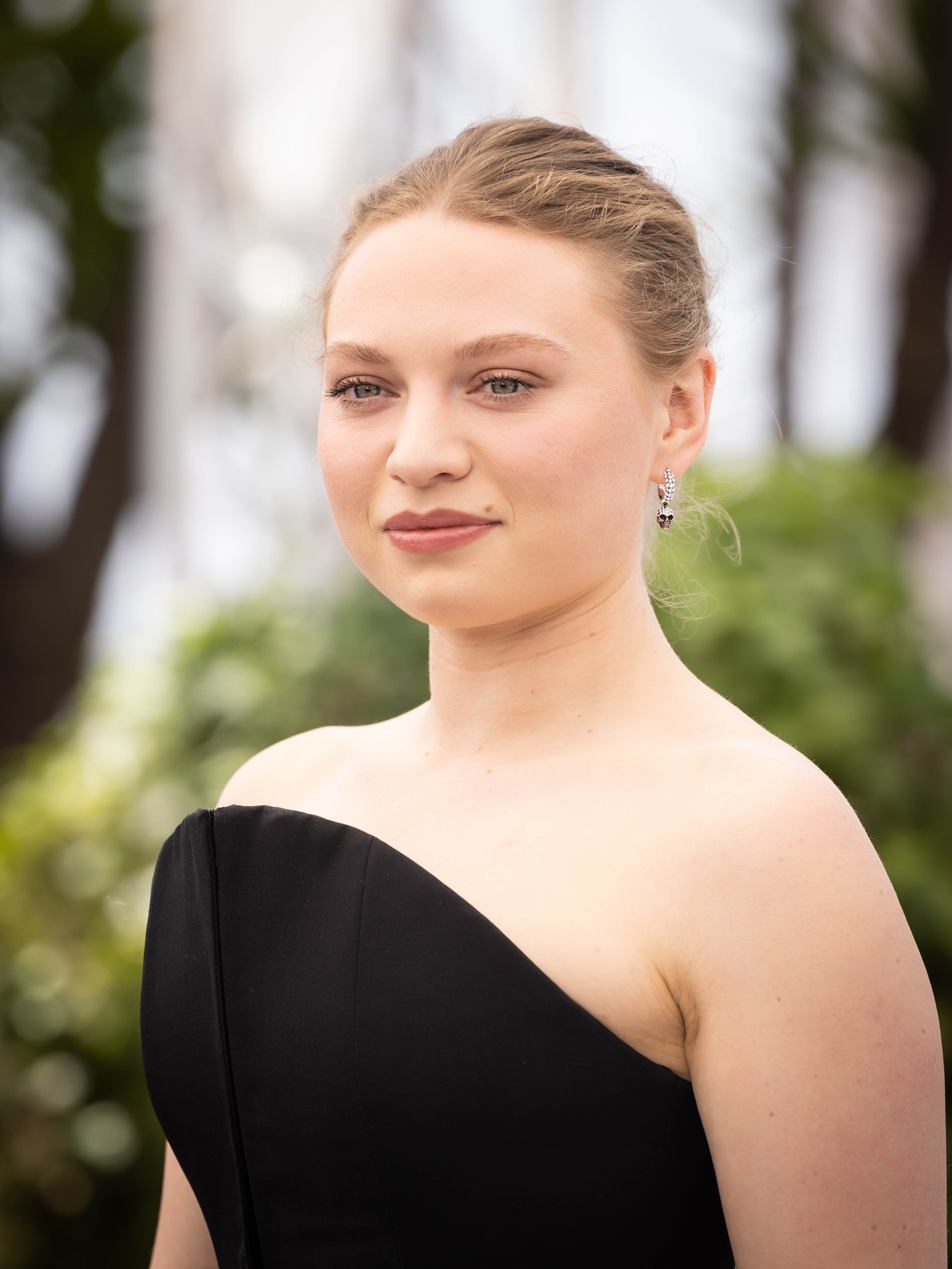
- Threapleton in 2025
- Born: Mia Honey Winslet Threapleton; 12 October 2000 (age 26); London, England
- Occupation: Actress
- Years active: 2014–present
- Parents: Jim Threapleton (father); Kate Winslet (mother)
- Relatives: Joe Anders (half-brother)

Mia Honey Winslet Threapleton (Note: Kate Winslet said that all of her children have her surname.) (born 12 October 2000) is an English actress. The daughter of actress Kate Winslet and painter-filmmaker Jim Threapleton, she made her film debut at the age of 13 with a non-speaking cameo in the period drama A Little Chaos (2014). On television, she co-starred with her mother in the episode "I Am Ruth" (2022) of the anthology series I Am..., and appeared in the period drama series Dangerous Liaisons (2022) and The Buccaneers (2023–present). She had her first lead role in a feature film in the black comedy The Phoenician Scheme (2025).

== Early life ==
Mia Honey Winslet Threapleton was born on 12 October 2000 in London to actress Kate Winslet and painter-filmmaker Jim Threapleton. Her parents divorced in 2001. Her name Mia means "mine" in Italian and has no family significance associated with it; her parents just found it beautiful. She has four half-siblings; actor Joe Anders (born 2003) from her mother's second marriage to film director Sam Mendes, another half-brother (born 2013) from her mother's third marriage to English businessman Edward Abel Smith, and two half-sisters from her father's second marriage. Her maternal grandmother worked as a nanny and waitress, and her maternal grandfather was a struggling actor who took labouring jobs to support the family. Her paternal grandfather, Edward ‘Ted’ Threapleton, is a Royal Air Force Officer. She has Irish and Swedish ancestry through her mother. Her maternal great-grandparents were both actors and ran the Reading Repertory Theatre Company. Her step-father, Edward Abel Smith, is the former head of marketing promotion and astronaut experience at Virgin Galactic and the nephew of the company's co-founder, English business mogul Richard Branson. After marrying Winslet in 2012, Abel Smith became a stay-at-home dad helping her raise her children.

Threapleton's parents decided to keep her and her siblings out of the spotlight when they were growing up. She grew up between New York City and England. In 2010, she moved with her mother and half-brother from New York City to England in order to avoid paparazzi, and since 2013 they have lived in West Wittering, Sussex.

Despite being the daughter of an actress, Threapleton rarely went to film sets as a child. She said, "I really could count on one hand—both hands possibly—the amount of times that I went to set as a kid. My mother really strived to keep that world separate from our home life. That's something that she really wanted. She would say, 'All of their experiences will be theirs and theirs alone'—which is exactly what has happened." After her mother experienced harassment and body-shaming at the height of her fame following her starring role in Titanic (1997), she made sure to teach Threapleton body positivity and that she felt comfortable in her own skin from a young age.

Threapleton became a fan of director Wes Anderson after watching Fantastic Mr. Fox (2009) when she was eight or nine years old. When she was thirteen, she wrote on her journal, "Watching Moonrise Kingdom (2012) again, bloody love this film. Would love to work with Wes Anderson one day."

During her childhood, she aspired to become a marine biologist; however, this dream was soon abandoned upon the realisation that she struggled with mathematics and science. Around the age of thirteen, she first openly expressed her desire to pursue acting, confiding in her mother as the first person to hear of her new ambition.

== Career ==
Threapleton made her film debut at the age of 13 with a brief non-speaking cameo appearance credited as Helene in Alan Rickman's British period drama A Little Chaos (2014), starring her mother. Years later, she actively searched for talent agents and explored open audition opportunities through casting websites. Using her father's surname as her stage name helped Threapleton slip under the radar during auditions when she started acting, because casting directors did not associate her with her famous mother. In a 2021 interview, Winslet said that having a different surname was great for Threapleton's initial job. "The people who cast her had absolutely no idea that she was my daughter. And of course, that was my biggest fear and most important for her self esteem," she said. Threapleton later played the roles of Alma in the 2020 Italian thriller film Shadows, and Rose in the 2022 American period drama television series Dangerous Liaisons.

In 2022, she co-starred with her mother Kate Winslet in "I Am Ruth", an episode of the Channel 4 anthology series I Am..., whose dialogues were entirely improvised, and also featured her half-brother Joe Anders portraying her character's brother. The episode won the Best Single Drama BAFTA, with Winslet winning the Best Actress BAFTA. In 2023, she starred in Karim Aïnouz's historical drama film Firebrand, and on Apple TV+'s period drama series The Buccaneers (2023–present), for which she won the Breakout Artist Award at the 2025 Newport Beach Film Festival. In 2024, she made a cameo on Netflix's biographical drama film Scoop as a Royal Aide to Prince Andrew who organizes his Teddy Bears collection.

In 2025, Threapleton had her first leading role in a feature film in Wes Anderson's black comedy The Phoenician Scheme (2025), for which her performance as Sister Liesl, a nun who is estranged from her father, received rave reviews following the film's premiere at the 2025 Cannes Film Festival. She landed the role after a long audition process that began in May 2023, when she sent Anderson a self-shot audition tape without knowing anything about her character. Her tape stood out among over a thousand tapes that Anderson had watched at that point, and he asked her to meet with him in London and later for a reading with Benicio del Toro. Both Anderson and del Toro (who plays her character's father in the film and did a two-day screen test with Threapleton), agreed that she should be cast for the role. del Toro, who endorsed Threapleton after their first reading together, said, "When she walked out, I remember telling Wes, 'I think she can go toe to toe; she might be short, but she's terrific'". Anderson said he only discovered that Threapleton is Winslet's daughter after he had watched her audition video a few times and then looked her up to check her previous work.

She is set to next star in Damien Chazelle's upcoming untitled prison film with Daniel Craig, Cillian Murphy, and Michelle Williams.

== Personal life ==
Threapleton has dyslexia. She said that she has to read scripts "slowly and steadily to be able to absorb things fully sometimes."

Threapleton does not use social media. She explained her decision in a May 2025 interview with The New York Times, "I don't think it's something that would particularly serve my life, and I'm quite happy that I don't have it." Her hobbies include painting, drawing, photography and mountain climbing.

== Filmography ==
=== Film ===
Year	Title	Role	Notes
2014	A Little Chaos	Helene	
2020	Shadows	Alma	
2023	Firebrand	Joan	
2024	Scoop	Aide to Prince Andrew	
2024	Barton Turf	Aimee	Short film
2024	Two Places at Once	Danni	Short film
2025	The Phoenician Scheme	Sister Liesl	
TBA	Untitled Damien Chazelle film	TBA	Filming
TBA	The Price of Peace	Mary Churchill	Filming

=== Television ===
Year	Title	Role	Notes
2022	Dangerous Liaisons	Rose	6 episodes
2022	I Am...	Freya	Episode: "I Am Ruth"
2023–present	The Buccaneers	Honoria Marable	Main cast

== Accolades ==
Year	Award / Festival	Category	Work	Result	Ref.
2025	Newport Beach Film Festival	Breakout Artist	The Buccaneers	Won	
2025	Variety + Golden Globes Vanguard Award	Breakout Artist	The Phoenician Scheme	Won	
2025	Florida Film Critics Circle	Best Supporting Actress	The Phoenician Scheme	Nominated	
