= Sam Mendes =

British filmmaker and stage director (born 1965)

Sir Sam Mendes CBE
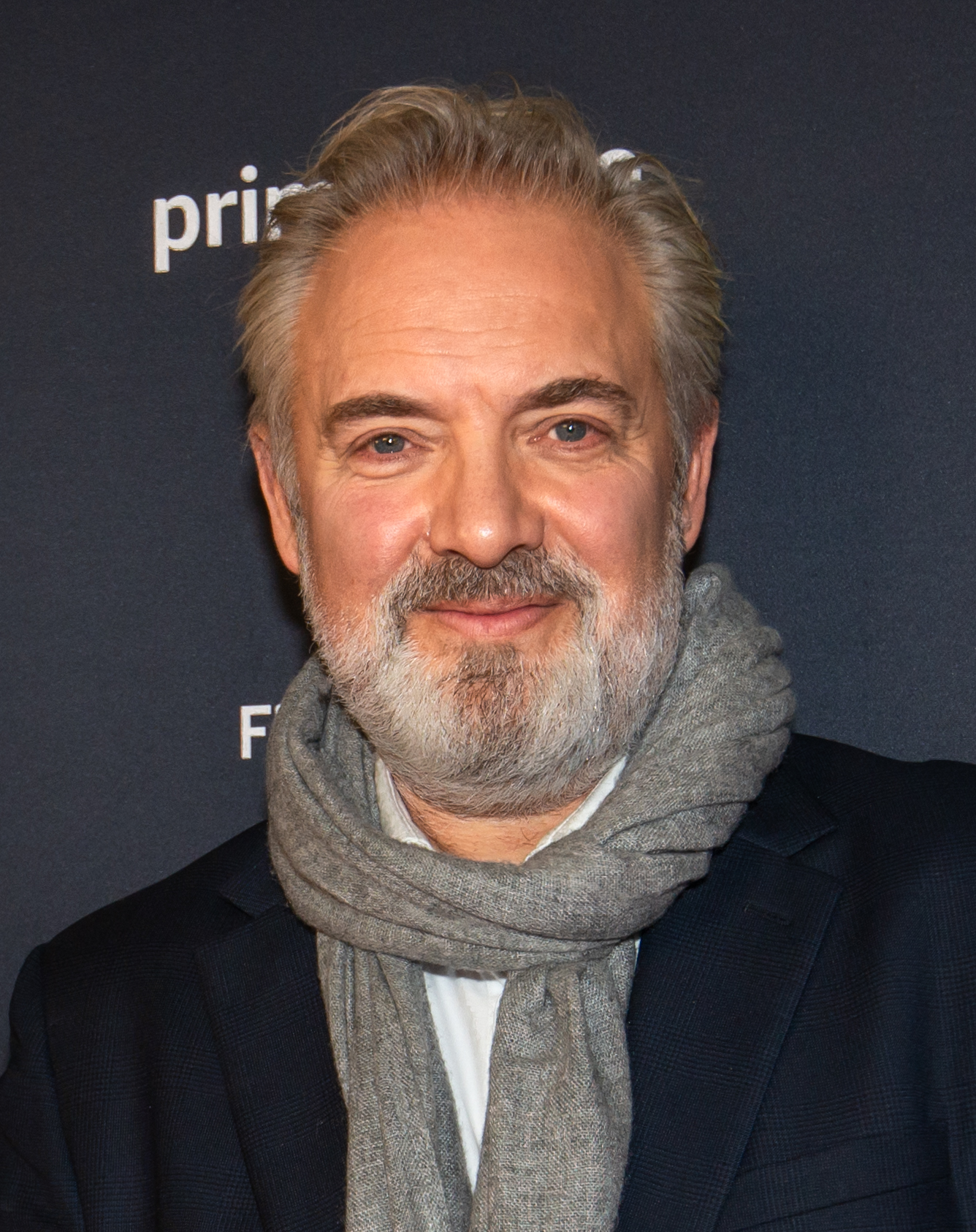
- Mendes in 2022
- Born: Samuel Alexander Mendes; 1 August 1965 (age 61); Reading, Berkshire, England
- Education: Peterhouse, Cambridge
- Occupations: Director; producer; screenwriter
- Years active: 1987–present
- Spouses: Kate Winslet (m. 2003; div. 2011); Alison Balsom (m. 2017)
- Children: 2, including Joe Anders
- Relatives: Valerie Mendes (mother); Alfred Mendes (grandfather); Jameson Mendes (father)
- Awards: Full list

Sir Samuel Alexander Mendes CBE (born 1 August 1965) is an English filmmaker and stage director. Mendes was appointed a CBE for his services to drama in 2000, and he was knighted in 2020 by Queen Elizabeth II. Known for his directorial work on stage and screen, he has received various accolades including an Academy Award, five BAFTA Awards, two Golden Globe Awards, three Olivier Awards and two Tony Awards.

Born in Reading to a Trinidadian Catholic father and an English Jewish mother, Mendes grew up in North London. He read English at Peterhouse at Cambridge University, and began directing plays there before joining the Donmar Warehouse, which became a centre of 1990s London theatre culture. In theatre, he is known for his dark re-inventions of the stage musicals Cabaret (1993), Oliver! (1994), Company (1995), and Gypsy (2003).

He directed an original West End stage musical for the first time with Charlie and the Chocolate Factory (2013). For his work on the London stage, Mendes has received five Laurence Olivier Awards for Company, Twelfth Night and The Ferryman and for his work on Broadway he has earned two Tony Awards for Best Direction of a Play for his work on The Ferryman in 2019, and The Lehman Trilogy in 2022.

In film, he made his directorial debut with the suburban drama American Beauty (1999), which earned him the Academy Award and Golden Globe Award for Best Director. For the war epic drama 1917 (2019), he received the BAFTA Award and Golden Globe Award for Best Director, as well as his second Academy Award nomination for Best Director. He has also directed the crime drama Road to Perdition (2002), the war drama Jarhead (2005), the romance drama Revolutionary Road (2008), and the James Bond films Skyfall (2012) and Spectre (2015). Mendes is currently developing a set of four individual but interconnected films, based on the lives of each of the members of the Beatles.

Mendes has been married twice including to actress Kate Winslet. He was awarded the Shakespeare Prize by the Alfred Toepfer Foundation in Hamburg, Germany in 2000 and the lifetime achievement award from the Directors Guild of Great Britain in 2005. In 2008, The Daily Telegraph ranked him number 15 in their list of the "100 most powerful people in British culture".

== Early life and education ==
Mendes was born on 1 August 1965 in Reading, Berkshire. He is the son of Valerie Mendes (born Barnett), a publisher and author, and Jameson Peter Mendes, a university professor. His father is a Roman Catholic of Portuguese descent from Trinidad and Tobago, and his mother is an English Jew. His grandfather was the Trinidadian writer Alfred Hubert Mendes.

Mendes's parents divorced when he was three years old, after which Mendes and his mother settled in Primrose Hill in North London. He attended Primrose Hill Primary School and was in the same class as future Foreign Secretary David Miliband and author Zoë Heller. In 1976, the family relocated to Woodstock near Oxford, where Mendes's mother found work as a senior editor at Oxford University Press. Mendes was educated at Magdalen College School where he met future theatre designer Tom Piper, who went on to work with Mendes on a National Theatre revival of Harold Pinter's The Birthday Party.

Mendes had an early interest in cinema and applied to the University of Warwick (then the only university in the UK that offered an undergraduate film course), but was turned down. He was then accepted at the University of Cambridge, graduating at Peterhouse with first-class honours in English. Having developed a passion for theatre only in his late teens, Mendes became a member of the Marlowe Society at Cambridge and directed several plays. His first play was David Halliwell's Little Malcolm and His Struggle Against the Eunuchs, and one of his later productions was Cyrano de Bergerac with Tom Hollander and Jonathan Cake among the cast members. During his time at Cambridge, Mendes also became enthusiastic about cinema in earnest. He cited Paris, Texas, Repo Man and True Stories as three "seminal film moments" that influenced his stage and film career.

Mendes was noted as a "brilliant schoolboy cricketer" by Wisden Cricketers' Almanack, scoring 1,153 runs at 46 and taking 83 wickets at under 16 for Magdalen College School in 1983 and 1984. He also played cricket for Cambridge University Cricket Club, and in 1997 played for Shipton-under-Wychwood in the final of the Village Cricket Cup, the only winner of the Academy Award for Best Director to have played at Lord's.

== Career ==
=== 1987–1999: Theatrical prodigy and Hollywood breakthrough ===
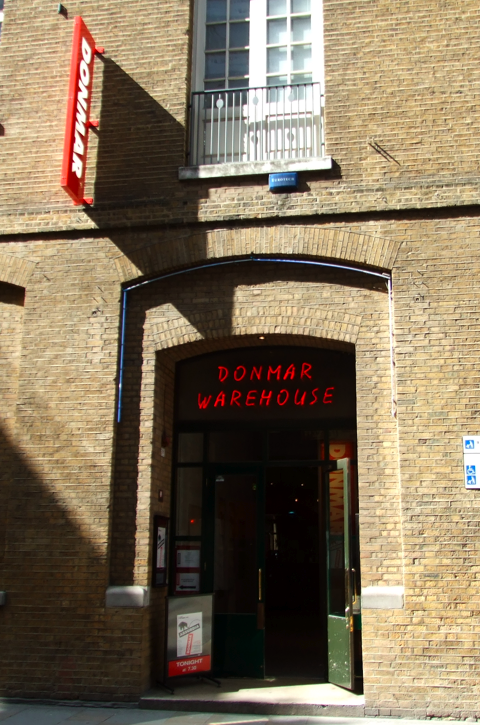
Mendes served as the artistic director of the Donmar Warehouse from 1992 to 2002

After graduating from Cambridge in 1987, Mendes was hired as assistant director at the Chichester Festival Theatre. In September 1987, Mendes made his professional directing debut with a double bill of two Anton Chekhov plays, The Bear and The Proposal. In 1989, he was appointed the inaugural director of the Minerva Theatre. In 1989, following the abrupt departure of director Robin Phillips, Mendes took over a production of Dion Boucicault's London Assurance at Chichester. Later that year, Mendes made his West End debut at the Aldwych with a production of Chekhov's The Cherry Orchard, starring Judi Dench. London Assurance then transferred to the West End following a six-month run at Chichester, opening at the Theatre Royal Haymarket. The successes of the plays established Mendes as a theatre director of national renown.

In 1990, Mendes was appointed artistic director of the Donmar Warehouse, a Covent Garden studio space previously used by the Royal Shakespeare Company. He spent two years overseeing the redesign of the theatre, which formally opened in 1992 with the British premiere of Stephen Sondheim's Assassins. Mendes's tenure at the Donmar saw its transformation into one of the most successful and fashionable playhouses in London. In 1993, Mendes staged an acclaimed revival of John Kander and Fred Ebb's Cabaret starring Jane Horrocks as Sally Bowles and Alan Cumming as Emcee. The production was approached with a fresh concept, differing greatly from both the original 1966 production directed by Harold Prince and the famed film version, directed by Bob Fosse. This production opened at the Donmar and received four Olivier Award nominations including Best Musical Revival, before transferring promptly to Broadway where it played for several years at the Kit Kat Club (i.e. the Stephen Sondheim Theatre). The Broadway cast included Cumming once again as Emcee, with Natasha Richardson as Sally, Mary Louise Wilson as Fraulein Schneider, John Benjamin Hickey as Cliff, and Ron Rifkin as Herr Schultz. Cumming, Richardson, and Rifkin all won Tony Awards for their performances.

1994 saw Mendes stage a new production of Lionel Bart's Oliver!, produced by Cameron Mackintosh. Mendes, a longtime fan of the work, worked in close collaboration with Bart and other production team members, William David Brohn, Martin Koch and Anthony Ward, to create a fresh staging of the well-known classic. Bart added new musical material and Mendes updated the book slightly, while the orchestrations were radically rewritten to suit the show's cinematic feel. The cast included Jonathan Pryce (after much persuasion) as Fagin, Sally Dexter as Nancy, and Miles Anderson as Bill Sikes. Mendes, Pryce and Dexter received Olivier Award nominations for their work on Oliver!.

Mendes also directed productions of David Hare's The Blue Room in 1998, starring Nicole Kidman; Richard Greenberg's Three Days of Rain in 1999, with Colin Firth, David Morrissey and Elizabeth McGovern. In 1999, Mendes made his film directorial debut with American Beauty, starring Kevin Spacey. He had been approached by Steven Spielberg, who was impressed by his productions of Oliver! and Cabaret. The film grossed $356.3 million worldwide. The film won the Golden Globe Award, the BAFTA Award and the Academy Award for Best Picture. Mendes won the Golden Globe Award, Directors Guild of America Award, and the Academy Award for Best Director, becoming the sixth director to earn the Academy Award for his feature film debut.

=== 2000–2009: Established directorial career ===
Mendes made his farewell with the Donmar Warehouse with the duo in 2002, Chekhov's Uncle Vanya and Twelfth Night, both headed by Simon Russell Beale, Helen McCrory, Emily Watson and Mark Strong. He stepped down as artistic director of the Donmar in December 2002 and was succeeded by Michael Grandage. In 2003, Mendes directed a revival of the musical Gypsy. Originally, he planned to stage this production in London's West End with an eventual Broadway transfer, but when negotiations fell through, he brought it to New York. The cast included Bernadette Peters as Rose, Tammy Blanchard as Louise and John Dossett as Herbie.

Mendes's second film, in 2002, was Road to Perdition, which grossed US$181 million. As of October 2023, the aggregate review score on Rotten Tomatoes is currently 81%; critics praised Paul Newman for his performance. The film was nominated for six Academy Awards, including Best Supporting Actor for Newman; it won for Best Cinematography. In 2003, Mendes established Neal Street Productions, a film, television and theatre production company he would use to finance much of his later work. In 2005, Mendes directed the war film Jarhead, in association with his production company Neal Street Productions. The film received mixed reviews, with a Rotten Tomatoes rating of 61%, and a gross revenue of US$96.9 million worldwide. The film focused on the boredom and other psychological challenges of wartime.

In 2008, Mendes directed Revolutionary Road, starring his then-wife, Kate Winslet, along with Leonardo DiCaprio and Kathy Bates. In a January 2009 interview, Mendes commented, about directing his wife for the first time: "I would open my eyes in the morning and there Kate would be, going, 'Great! You're awake! Now let's talk about the second scene.'" Mendes's comedy-drama Away We Go opened the 2009 Edinburgh International Film Festival. The film follows a couple (John Krasinski, Maya Rudolph) searching North America for the perfect community in which to settle down and start a family. The film was well received by critics but performed poorly at the box office.

=== 2010–2016: Helming the Bond films ===
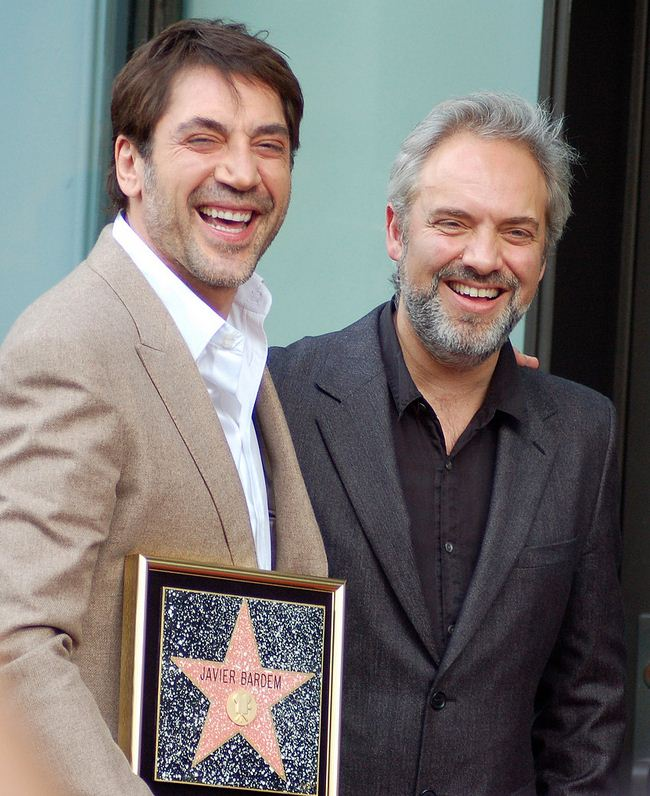
Mendes (right) collaborated with Javier Bardem for Skyfall, November 2012

In 2010, Mendes co-produced a critically acclaimed documentary film Out of the Ashes that deals with cricket in Afghanistan. On 5 January 2010, news broke that Mendes was employed to direct the 23rd Eon Productions instalment of the James Bond franchise. The film, Skyfall, was subsequently released on 26 October 2012, to coincide with the 50th anniversary of the Bond films. Mendes had been employed as a consultant on the film when it was in pre-production, and had remained attached to the project during the financial troubles of MGM. The film was a major critical and commercial success, becoming the 14th film to gross over $1 billion worldwide.

In 2012, Mendes's Neal Street Productions produced the first series of the BBC One drama series, Call the Midwife, following it with a second season which began transmission in early 2013. Mendes also directed the 2013 Olivier Award-nominated stage adaptation of Roald Dahl's Charlie and the Chocolate Factory which ran in London's West End until January 2017. It starred Douglas Hodge as Willy Wonka, followed by Alex Jennings and Jonathan Slinger who later took over the role. In 2014, Mendes directed Simon Russell Beale in King Lear by William Shakespeare at the National Theatre, London.

After the success of Skyfall, Mendes was asked if he was returning to direct the next Bond film. He responded, "I felt I put everything I possibly could into this film and it was the Bond film I wanted to make. And if I felt I could do the same again, then absolutely I would consider doing another one. But it is a big task and I wouldn't do it unless I knew I could." It was reported that one reason Mendes was reluctant to commit was that one proposal involved making two films back-to-back, based on an idea by Skyfall writer John Logan, which would have resulted in Mendes and other creative personnel being tied up with filming for around four years. It was reported in February 2013 that this idea had since been shelved and that the next two films would be stand-alone. Mendes said in an interview with film magazine Empire in March 2013 that "it has been a very difficult decision not to accept Michael and Barbara's very generous offer to direct the next Bond movie." He cited, amongst other reasons, his commitments to the stage version of Charlie and the Chocolate Factory and King Lear.

However, on 29 May 2013, it was reported that Mendes was back in negotiations with producers Michael G. Wilson and Barbara Broccoli to direct the next Bond film, going back on his previous comments. Wilson and Broccoli were willing to postpone production of the film to ensure Mendes's participation. On 11 July 2013, it was announced that Mendes would direct the 24th James Bond film, Spectre; it was released in October 2015. This made him the first filmmaker since John Glen to direct two Bond films consecutively. In April 2016, Mendes was named as the president of the jury for the 73rd Venice International Film Festival.

=== 2017–2024: 1917 and further acclaim on stage ===
Mendes directed Jez Butterworth's The Ferryman for the Royal Court Theatre in London in 2017, before transferring to the West End later that year and Broadway in 2018, for which he won an Olivier Award and Tony Award for Best Director. In 2018, Mendes directed The Lehman Trilogy by Stefano Massini in an English adaptation by Ben Power for the National Theatre, London starring Simon Russell Beale, Adam Godley and Ben Miles. In 2019 the play played a season at the Park Avenue Armory in New York before returning for another London season in the West End. The play made its Broadway transfer in 2020 briefly but was stalled due to the COVID-19 pandemic. The play resumed performances in 2021 and went on to receive eight Tony Award nominations winning five awards including Best Play and Best Director of a Play.

Mendes at the BFI premiere of Empire of Light (2022)

Mendes's next film, historical World War I epic 1917, was released by Universal Pictures on 25 December 2019 in the US and on 10 January 2020 in the UK. Based in part on an account told to Mendes by his paternal grandfather, Alfred Mendes, it chronicles the story of two young British soldiers in the spring of 1917 at a critical point during World War I. Mendes went on to win the Golden Globe Award for Best Director for his achievement in directing; in his acceptance speech, he saluted his grandfather, as well as acknowledging the contribution to cinema of fellow nominee Martin Scorsese, who was nominated for The Irishman. For the film he won the Directors Guild of America Award for Outstanding Directing – Feature Film, following which he was installed by the press as the favourite to win the Academy Award for Best Director at the then approaching 92nd Academy Awards. However that plaudit went instead to Bong Joon-ho for the South Korean film Parasite. The two directors had shared the honours for directing at the 25th Critics' Choice Awards several weeks prior.

In 2022, his next feature was the romantic drama Empire of Light, starring Olivia Colman and Micheal Ward. The film premiered at the 49th Telluride Film Festival to mixed reviews but was ultimately nominated for the BAFTA Award for Outstanding British Film. The following year he returned to the stage, directing the Jack Thorne play The Motive and the Cue (2023) about the backstage drama behind Richard Burton's 1964 production of Hamlet. The production starred Johnny Flynn as Burton and Mark Gatiss as John Gielgud. The production was produced at the Royal National Theatre before transferring to the Noël Coward Theatre both in 2023. The play received positive reviews as well as nominations for three Laurence Olivier Awards as well as a nomination for the Laurence Olivier Award for Best Director for Mendes.

The following year, he directed the Jez Butterworth play The Hills of California (2024), which premiered at the Harold Pinter Theatre on the West End and received two Laurence Olivier Award nominations including for Best New Play. The play transferred to Broadway at the Broadhurst Theatre where it received critical acclaim as well as 7 Tony Award nominations including for Best Direction of a Play for Mendes. The following year he, alongside Steven Spielberg, produced the Chloé Zhao historical drama Hamnet (2025) for which he was nominated for the Academy Award for Best Picture and won the BAFTA Award for Outstanding British Film.

=== 2025–present: Beatles biopic film series ===
In February 2024, it was reported that Mendes would produce and direct four separate feature films about each member of the Beatles, to be released in April 2028. Collectively titled The Beatles – A Four-Film Cinematic Event, these will be the first Beatles biopics to have full cooperation from Paul McCartney, Ringo Starr, and the families of John Lennon and George Harrison. The films will star Paul Mescal (McCartney), Barry Keoghan (Starr), Harris Dickinson (Lennon), and Joseph Quinn (Harrison).

In April 2025, Mendes's first television documentary film What They Found was aired on BBC Two on the 80th anniversary of the liberation of the Bergen-Belsen concentration camp. It was made in collaboration with the Imperial War Museum, and depicts the discovery of the camp using original footage and testimonies of two British Army cameramen. Mendes said the documentary aimed to give "a unique perspective on the discovery of the horrors of Belsen and the reality of the Holocaust." The producers said the film was intended as a historical record at a time when the awareness of the Holocaust had been declining among younger generations.

== Style and influences ==
Mendes has listed Stanley Kubrick, the Coen brothers, Alfred Hitchcock, Martin Scorsese, Wim Wenders, Howard Davies, David Lynch, Peter Brook, Ingmar Bergman, Orson Welles, and Francis Ford Coppola as amongst his cinematic and theatrical influences. He cited Paris, Texas, Repo Man and True Stories as three "seminal film moments" that influenced his stage and film career, and is also heavily influenced by British comedy acts such as Monty Python, The Goons, Tommy Cooper, and Morecambe and Wise.

Much of his film directing techniques were informed by his background in theatre, which consisted of meticulous attention to detail, slow pacing, pictorialist composition, close collaborations with actors, use of tranquil atmosphere, periods of wordless visual storytelling, and long takes. His first two films established a reputation for him of utilising a visual style that was considered formalist and classical, preferring to shoot and stage scenes with theatrical-style mise-en-scene and use of chiaroscuro. His third film, Jarhead, which would mark the first of a long-time collaboration between him and cinematographer Roger Deakins, served as a stylistic departure from the former two films as it relied heavily on a grittier feel with improvised dialogue and looser handheld close-ups. Despite this, it shared a similar attention to detail and flawed characters.

Although he has tackled a variety of genres over the course of his career, Mendes has frequently explored themes of family and isolation in his work. The protagonists in his films are realistically flawed and struggle to fit in a world that is hostile towards them, a theme that was initially established in American Beauty and would be further explored in his subsequent films, including Skyfall and Spectre, and 1917. The exploration of such themes are owed to his early childhood experiences, particularly with his parents, with the most direct being his grandfather and his mother serving as inspirations for the characters of Schofield and Hilary Small in 1917 and Empire of Light, respectively.

In an interview in 2014, Mendes explained his reasoning for exploring such themes: "If you are doing a play or a film, you have to have a secret way in if you are directing it. Sometimes it’s big things. American Beauty, for me, was about my adolescence. Road to Perdition was about my childhood. Skyfall was about middle-age and mortality."

== Personal life ==
Mendes has been married to British Classical musician Alison Balsom since 5 January 2017. Their daughter was born in September 2017. Mendes has a son, actor Joe Anders, born on 22 December 2003, from his marriage to actress Kate Winslet, and a stepson born in March 2010 from Balsom's previous relationship with conductor Edward Gardner. Mendes had a stepdaughter, Mia Threapleton, from Winslet's first marriage to filmmaker Jim Threapleton.

Mendes was appointed a Knight Bachelor in the 2020 New Years Honours List for services to drama.

In 2009, Mendes signed a petition in support of film director Roman Polanski, calling for his release after Polanski was arrested in Switzerland in relation to his 1977 charge for drugging and raping a 13-year-old girl.

== Favourite films ==
In 2012, Mendes participated in the Sight & Sound film polls of that year. Held every ten years to select the greatest films of all time, contemporary directors were asked to select ten films of their choice.

- The 400 Blows (France, 1959)
- Blue Velvet (USA, 1986)
- Citizen Kane (USA, 1941)
- Fanny and Alexander (Sweden, 1984)
- The Godfather Part II (USA, 1974)
- Kes (UK, 1969)
- Rosemary's Baby (USA, 1968)
- Taxi Driver (USA, 1976)
- There Will Be Blood (USA, 2007)
- Vertigo (USA, 1958)

== Credits ==
Key
†	Denotes works that have not yet been released

=== Film ===
Year	Title	Director	Producer	Writer	
1999	American Beauty	Yes	No	No	
2002	Road to Perdition	Yes	Yes	No	
2005	Jarhead	Yes	No	No	
2008	Revolutionary Road	Yes	Yes	No	
2009	Away We Go	Yes	No	No	
2012	Skyfall	Yes	No	No	
2015	Spectre	Yes	No	No	
2019	1917	Yes	Yes	Yes	
2022	Empire of Light	Yes	Yes	Yes	
2028	Untitled John Lennon film †	Yes	Yes	No	In production
2028	Untitled Paul McCartney film †	Yes	Yes	No	In production
2028	Untitled George Harrison film †	Yes	Yes	No	In production
2028	Untitled Ringo Starr film †	Yes	Yes	No	In production

Producer only

- Things We Lost in the Fire (2007)
- Hamnet (2025)

Executive producer only

- Starter for 10 (2006)
- The Kite Runner (2007)
- Out of the Ashes (2010) (Documentary)
- Blood (2012)

=== Television ===
Year	Title	Notes
2024	The Franchise	Co-creator; directed episode: "Scene 31A: Tecto Meets Eye"

Executive producer only

Year	Title	Notes
2007	Stuart: A Life Backwards	Television film
2012	Call the Midwife	
2012	Richard II	Television film
2012	Henry IV, Part I	Television film
2012	Henry IV, Part II	Television film
2012	Henry V	Television film
2014–16	Penny Dreadful	
2016	The Hollow Crown: Richard III	Television film
2016	The Hollow Crown: Henry VI, Part I	Television film
2016	The Hollow Crown: Henry VI, Part II	Television film
2017	Britannia	
2018	Informer	
2020	Penny Dreadful: City of Angels	
2025	What They Found	Documentary

=== Theatre ===
Year	Title	Venue	Notes	Ref.
1992	Assassins	Donmar Warehouse	London	
1993	The Tempest	Royal Shakespeare Theatre	Startford-Upon-Avon	
1993	The Rise and Fall of Little Voice	Royal National Theatre	London	
1993	Cabaret	Donmar Warehouse	London	
1994	Glengarry Glen Ross	Donmar Warehouse	London	
1995	Oliver!	London Palladium	London	
1995	Company	Donmar Warehouse	London	
1996	The Glass Menagerie	Donmar Warehouse	London	
1997	Othello	Royal National Theatre	London	
1998	Cabaret	Henry Miller's Theatre	Broadway	
1998	The Blue Room	Donmar Warehouse	London	
1998	The Blue Room	Cort Theatre	Broadway	
2002	Uncle Vanya	Donmar Warehouse	London	
2002	Twelfth Night	Donmar Warehouse	London	
2003	Uncle Vanya	Brooklyn Academy of Music	Off-Broadway	
2003	Twelfth Night	Brooklyn Academy of Music	Off-Broadway	
2003	Gypsy	Shubert Theatre	Broadway	
2006	The Vertical Hour	Music Box Theatre	Broadway	
2010	The Tempest	The Old Vic	London	
2011	Richard III	The Old Vic	London	
2013	Charlie and the Chocolate Factory	Theatre Royal, Drury Lane	London	
2014	King Lear	Royal National Theatre	London	
2014	Cabaret	Studio 54	Broadway	
2017	The Ferryman	Royal Court Theatre	London	
2017	The Ferryman	Gielgud Theatre	London	
2018	The Ferryman	Bernard B. Jacobs Theatre	Broadway	
2018	The Lehman Trilogy	Royal National Theatre	London	
2018	The Lehman Trilogy	Park Avenue Armory	Off-Broadway	
2019	The Lehman Trilogy	Piccadilly Theatre	London	
2021	The Lehman Trilogy	Nederlander Theatre	Broadway	
2023	The Motive and the Cue	Royal National Theatre	London	
2023	The Motive and the Cue	Noël Coward Theatre	London	
2024	The Hills of California	Harold Pinter Theatre	London	
2024	The Hills of California	Broadhurst Theatre	Broadway	

== Reception ==
Film	Rotten Tomatoes	Metacritic	CinemaScore	Budget	Box office
American Beauty	87%	84	B+	$15 million	$356.3 million
Road to Perdition	82%	72	B+	$80 million	$183.4 million
Jarhead	60%	58	B	$72 million	$97.1 million
Revolutionary Road	67%	69	—	$45 million	$79.5 million
Away We Go	67%	58	—	$17 million	$14.9 million
Skyfall	92%	81	A	$150–200 million	$1.109 billion
Spectre	63%	60	A	$245–300 million	$880.7 million
1917	88%	78	A	$90–100 million	$446.1 million
Empire of Light	44%	54	—	—	$11.4 million

== Awards and honours ==
Awards and nominations received for films directed by Mendes
Year	Title	Academy Awards		BAFTA Awards		Golden Globe Awards	
Year	Title	Nominations	Wins	Nominations	Wins	Nominations	Wins
1999	American Beauty	8	5	14	6	6	3
2002	Road to Perdition	6	1	3	2	1	
2008	Revolutionary Road	3		4		4	1
2012	Skyfall	5	2	8	2	1	1
2015	Spectre	1	1			1	1
2019	1917	10	3	9	7	3	2
2022	Empire of Light	1		3		1	
Total		34	12	41	17	17	8

Directed Academy Award-winning performances
Under Mendes' direction, these actors have received Academy Award nominations (and wins) for their performances in their respective roles.

Year	Performer	Film	Result
Academy Award for Best Actor
1999	Kevin Spacey	American Beauty	Won
Academy Award for Best Actress
1999	Annette Bening	American Beauty	Nominated
Academy Award for Best Supporting Actor
2002	Paul Newman	Road to Perdition	Nominated
2008	Michael Shannon	Revolutionary Road	Nominated

== See also ==
- List of British film directors
- List of Academy Award winners and nominees from Great Britain
- List of oldest and youngest Academy Award winners and nominees – Youngest winners for Best Director
- List of Golden Globe winners
- Sam Mendes's unrealised projects

== Bibliography ==
- Wolf, Matt (2003). Sam Mendes at the Donmar: Stepping into Freedom. Lanham: Hal Leonard LLC. ISBN 9780879109820.
- Lowenstein, Stephen (2003). My First Movie, Take Two: Ten Celebrated Directors Talk About Their First Film. Lanham: Knopf Doubleday Publishing Group. ISBN 978-0-8108-8576-9.
