= Valerie Mendes =

English novelist and poet

Valerie Helene Mendes (née Barnett, born October 1939) is an English novelist and poet. Mendes is best known for her teenage fiction novels, Girl in the Attic, Coming of Age, Lost and Found and The Drowning, and for her historical novels for adults: Larkswood, Daddy’s Girl and Beatrice and Alexander. In 2021, Mendes published Not Only But Also: A Memoir under her own imprint VMBooks, and in 2022, The Gathering: Collected Poems.

== Life ==
Mendes was born in Buckinghamshire, South East England, in October 1939, the daughter of Reuben Barnett. She attended North London Collegiate School and the University of Reading. Her son, Sir Sam Mendes CBE, is a well-known theatre and film director. She has four grandchildren, including actor Joe Anders.

== Career ==
Mendes began her career as a journalist with Marshall Cavendish, working as an in-house writer and project editor on their weekly magazines Book of Life and Man and Woman. She then moved to Oxford University Press as an editor for their list of readers in the early days of the English Language Teaching Division. A period with Penguin Books as managing editor in their English Language Teaching Division followed, but two years later she returned at their invitation to OUP in Oxford, where she initiated and developed a new series of readers: Alpha Books from Oxford.

Between 1979 and 1983 Mendes, worked as the managing editor for Elsevier Oxford, on their Encyclopedia of Visual Art. The project was subsequently bought and published by both Macmillan and Encyclopedia Britannica. In 1985-1986 Mendes was promotions manager for the Franklin Watts Group, made up of three children’s imprints: Franklin Watts, Julia MacRae and Orchard Books. In 1987–1988 Mendes was senior lecturer in publishing at Oxford Polytechnic and publishing field chair; and in 1989-1990 publications manager for BUPA in London.

In 1990, Mendes founded Wordwise, a publishing and editorial consultancy based in north Oxford, where for eight years she wrote, edited and project-managed books for Blackwell Publishers, Chapman & Hall, Collins Educational, Edinburgh University Press, Ladybird Books, the Open University Press, Pinter Publishers, Routledge, and Thames and Hudson, among others.

While Mendes worked for Penguin Books, her stories New Year Cat and The Best Guy in Albert Street were published in Puffin Post. Between 1992 and 2001, she published two picture books: Tomasina's First Dance, illustrated by Heather Calder, and Look at Me, Grandma!, illustrated by Claire Fletcher. Tomasina's First Dance was illustrated by Heather Calder. Look at me, Grandma! was illustrated by Claire Fletcher. The picture book was praised for the repetitive nature of the writing.

In 2002, Mendes published her first novel for teenagers, Girl in the Attic, followed by four more: Coming of Age, Lost and Found, The Drowning and Where Peacocks Scream. In 2014, she published Larkswood, her first historical novel for the adult marketplace, followed by Daddy's Girl and Beatrice and Alexander.

== Books ==
- Girl in the Attic (2002)
- Coming of Age (2003)
- Lost and Found (2004)
- The Drowning (2005)
- Larkswood (2014)
- Where Peacocks Scream (2017)
- Daddy's Girl (2021)
- Beatrice and Alexander (2021)
- Not Only But Also: A Memoir (2021)
- The Gathering: Collected Poems (2022)

=== Picture books ===
- Tomasina's First Dance (1992)
- Look At Me, Grandma! (2001)
