= Heart of the Beast =

2026 film by David Ayer

- Theatrical release poster
- Directed by: David Ayer
- Written by: Cameron Alexander
- Produced by: David Ayer; Olivia Hamilton; Brad Pitt; Marty Bowen; Richard Raymond; Nick Satriano
- Starring: Brad Pitt; Uber (Note: Stunt doubles include Seeka, Ryker, and Hondo); J. K. Simmons; Anna Lambe
- Cinematography: Mauro Fiore
- Edited by: Dody Dorn
- Music by: Jared Michael Fry
- Production companies: Wild Chickens Productions; Temple Hill Entertainment; Kino World
- Distributed by: Paramount Pictures
- Release dates: September 16, 2026 (Franklin); September 25, 2026 (United States)
- Running time: 101 minutes
- Country: United States
- Language: English
- Budget: $82 million
- Box office: $194.8 million

Heart of the Beast is a 2026 American survival thriller film directed by David Ayer and written by Cameron Alexander. The film stars Brad Pitt as a retired Special Forces veteran navigating a grueling 58-mile (93-kilometer) trek to safety with his traumatized combat German Shepherd after their seaplane crashes in the Alaskan wilderness.

Heart of the Beast premiered at the FirstBank Amphitheater in Franklin, Tennessee on September 16, 2026, and released nationwide in the United States on September 25, 2026, by Paramount Pictures. The film received generally positive reviews from critics and grossed $193.1 million worldwide.

== Plot ==
Retired Special Forces Command Sergeant Major James Belmont and his combat dog Odin, both suffering from PTSD and nightmares, land their Cessna Skywagon on a remote Alaskan lake and camp overnight. While exploring the surrounding forest, James cautiously encounters Watkins, an outgoing stranger who sets up camp nearby. They talk late into the night, James shares stories of the heroism and sacrifices that Odin has made in his duty. The next morning, Watkins departs, leaving James a book in exchange for a Belgian ale he had taken from the camp overnight. He highlights a particular passage in the book, “he had survived the worst the world could throw at him. He had known the cruelty of men, but he had survived. And love for man had taken root in his heart.”

James and Odin depart by plane, but James suffers a heart attack mid-flight and crashes into a body of water. Odin is thrown out of the plane during the crash. James finds him nearby, weak but alive, then returns to the sunken wreckage to salvage his gear. Once Odin recovers enough to travel, the pair begin hiking toward civilization, approximately 58 miles (93 kilometers) away by James's calculations.

During their trek, they encounter a grizzly bear. James instructs Odin to not make eye contact or antagonize the bear, and it retreats. Later, they cross a precarious wooden bridge spanning a valley. James slips and swings Odin to safety before falling into the rapids below, where his arm becomes trapped between rocks and breaks. Odin finds him in the river and drags him ashore, then helps him reset the broken bone.

The pair later spot a pack of grey wolves attacking a moose calf and cautiously take a detour, however the pack leader notices Odin watching them. That night the wolves ambush them. James fights back with a spear and knife while Odin defends himself against the attackers. James eventually kills all but one wolf, which escapes, but his stomach suffers a bite. The following day, they wade through a flooded field, where James becomes trapped beneath submerged branches but manages to free himself by diving underwater.

As his injuries and exhaustion take their toll, James repeatedly stumbles before reaching the top of a hill. Unable to continue, he rests and writes a letter which he zips into a pouch on Odin's backpack. He points toward a nearby road, instructing Odin to run to it. After spending the night watching the northern lights together, they both fall asleep and James dies from his wounds.

In the morning Odin leaves James and reaches the road, where a young woman named Amber finds him. She reads the letter James wrote; documenting their ordeal, explaining who Odin is, asking whoever finds Odin to care for him and bequeathing all his money to whomever takes the dog in, saying he will "wait" for him. Odin enters Amber's truck, and they drive away.

== Cast ==
- Brad Pitt as James Belmont
- J. K. Simmons as Watkins
- Anna Lambe as Amber
- Uber, Seeka, Ryker, and Hondo as Odin the Dog

== Production ==
In March 2024, David Ayer signed on as director with a script by Cameron Alexander that was featured on the 2017 Black List of the year's "most liked" unproduced screenplays; Alexander served as an executive producer. Damien Chazelle and Olivia Hamilton produced the film through their label Wild Chickens Productions, with Paramount Pictures distributing as part of a first look deal between the companies, and Ayer and Chris Long serving as producers through Cedar Park Entertainment. In January 2025, Brad Pitt was announced to be starring in the project, also producing under his Plan B Entertainment banner. Temple Hill Entertainment also joined the project, with Ayer now producing under Crave Films. In February, J. K. Simmons joined the cast, with Anna Lambe joining a month later.

Principal photography began on March 3, 2025, in Queenstown, New Zealand, and wrapped on May 15.

Jared Michael Fry was hired to compose the score for the film, marking his third collaboration with Ayer following The Beekeeper (2024) and A Working Man (2025).

== Release ==
Heart of the Beast premiered at the FirstBank Amphitheater in Franklin, Tennessee on September 16, 2026. It premiered in a non-competition slot of the 74th San Sebastián International Film Festival on September 22, 2026. Advanced screening occurred on September 19, 2026 in New Zealand before its release on September 24, 2026. It released in the United States by Paramount Pictures on September 25, 2026. Its first trailer was shown at CinemaCon in April 2026. This would be the final film released by Paramount before the studio's acquisition of Warner Bros. Discovery on October 6, 2026.

== Reception ==
=== Box office ===
As of November 18, 2026, Heart of the Beast has grossed $68.5 million in the United States and Canada, and $124.6 million in other territories, for a worldwide total of $193.1 million.

In the United States and Canada, Heart of the Beast was released alongside Primetime, Forgotten Island, and Avengers Endgame: Encore, and was projected to gross $17–20 million in its opening weekend. The film made $7.6 million on its first day, and went on to debut to $20 million, finishing in third place behind Endgame and Resident Evil. In its sophomore weekend the film made $10.9 million, remaining in third place, and then $7.4 million in its third weekend, finishing in fourth.

=== Critical response ===
On the review aggregator website Rotten Tomatoes, 84% of 187 critics' reviews are positive, with an average rating of 7.0/10. The website's consensus reads: "A rigorously entertaining adventure story told through a spartan script and memorable set pieces, Heart of the Beast pays rousing tribute to man's best friend." Metacritic, which uses a weighted average, assigned the film a score of 66 out of 100, based on 32 critics, indicating "generally favorable" reviews. Audiences polled by CinemaScore gave the film an average grade of "A–" on an A+ to F scale, while 73% of filmgoers surveyed by PostTrak said they would definitely recommend it.
