= Aysha Joy Samuel =

German actress (born 1997)

Aysha Joy Samuel (born 24 May 1997) (age 29) is a German actress.

== Life ==
Born 24 May 1997 in Schwalmstadt, Samuel has roots in Trinidad and Tobago through her father. Between 6 and 16 she worked as artist at the Circus Rambazotti in Kassel, where she learned to perform with fire and the liberty dressage. At age 14, she joined a dance company, Body and Soul, where she toured around Germany. She signed with an agency in Cologne with the desire to become an actress and took on her first roles at the KiKa channel. From 2016 until 2018, she attended to the Film Acting School Cologne. After she got booked as supporting roles at shows like Tribes of Europa for Netflix, Almost Fly for HBO and Netflix she got booked as the lead in Notruf Hafenkante in seasons 17 and 18 the policewoman Desirée "Daisy" Petersen. She will also appear in the Wes Anderson film The Phoenician Scheme and the new series Softies for RTL+ with Damian Hardung.

She is active in various extreme sports, and lives in Berlin and Los Angeles.

== Filmography ==
Theatre

- 2009–2010: Circus Rambazotti – Das Drachenmärchen
- 2016–2017: Metropoltheater – Heinrich von Kleist
- 2017–2018: Metropoltheater – Durch die Nacht

Film/Television

- 2012: Trau dich
- 2014: Take-off: Der goldene Tabaluga
- 2016–2019: Professor T.
- 2019: Reiterhof Wildenstein – Neuanfang
- 2021: Tribes of Europa
- 2021: Die Chefin
- 2021: SOKO Potsdam
- 2022: Almost Fly
- 2021: Die Vermieterin
- 2022: Love Addicts
- 2022: Generation Rap
- 2022–2024: Notruf Hafenkante
- 2023: Quarks
- 2024: Tatort
- 2024: SOFTIES
- 2025: The Phoenician Scheme
