= Rent Free (2024 film) =

- Directed by: Fernando Andrés
- Screenplay by: Fernando Andrés; Tyler Rugh
- Produced by: Fernando Andrés; Jacob Roberts; Temple Baker
- Starring: Jacob Roberts; David Treviño
- Cinematography: Fernando Andrés
- Edited by: Fernando Andrés
- Music by: Austin Weber
- Release date: June 7, 2024 (Tribeca Festival)
- Running time: 93 minutes

Rent Free (released in Brazil as Sem Pagar Aluguel) is a 2024 American comedy drama film directed by Fernando Andrés from a screenplay written by Andrés and Tyler Rugh. The film stars Jacob Roberts and David Treviño as two best friends from Austin, Texas who attempt to go a year without paying rent after a failed move to New York City.

== Premise ==
Childhood friends Ben (Roberts) and Jordan (Treviño) plan to move from Austin to Brooklyn, but Ben's misjudged behavior towards their would-be roommate's boyfriend causes them to be kicked out of their new apartment. Back in Austin, the pair work gig economy jobs while living with Jordan's girlfriend Anna. When Anna kicks them out, the pair make a pact to couch surf for an entire year.

== Cast ==
- Jacob Roberts as Ben
- David Treviño as Jordan
- Molly Edelman
- Neal Mulani
- Sarah J. Bartholomew
- Zeke Goodman
- Jack Austin

== Production ==
Director Fernando Andrés and his cowriter and childhood friend Tyler Rugh previously collaborated on Andrés' 2022 feature directorial debut Three Headed Beast. Preproduction for Rent Free took place in spring 2023 and the project was filmed that July and August. Rent Free was largely shot in chronological order, other than the film's opening scenes in New York City, which were filmed after shooting wrapped in Austin.

== Release ==
Rent Free premiered on June 7, 2024, in the U.S. Narrative Competition at the Tribeca Festival.

== Reception ==
=== Accolades ===
Award	Ceremony date	Category	Recipient(s)	Result	Ref.
Tribeca Festival	June 15, 2024	U.S. Narrative Competition	Rent Free	Nominated	
