= The Hills of California =

2024 play by Jez Butterworth

- West End Promotional Poster
- Original language: English
- Written by: Jez Butterworth
- Setting: 1976, Blackpool

Premiere
- Date: 27 January 2024
- Place: Harold Pinter Theatre, London
- Directed by: Sam Mendes

The Hills of California is a play written by British playwright Jez Butterworth.

== Synopsis ==
According to the play's press release:

Set in 1976's Blackpool, The Hills of California takes place in the driest summer in 200 years, with beaches and hotels packed to capacity. Far from the tourist thoroughfares, the Webb Sisters cram into the guest house of their former home as their mother lies dying.

== Production history ==
=== West End (2024) ===
On 11 October 2023, it was announced that the play would premiere at the Harold Pinter Theatre in London's West End. The show was scheduled for a strictly limited run from 27 January to 15 June 2024. It was directed by Sam Mendes, with design by Rob Howell, lighting by Natasha Chivers, and sound, composition, and arrangement by Nick Powell; choreographed by Ellen Kane and with musical supervision and arrangement by Candida Caldicot. It was produced by Sonia Friedman Productions and Neal Street Productions.

=== Broadway (2024) ===
The production transferred to the Broadhurst Theatre on Broadway. Previews were expected to begin on 11 September 2024, with an official opening night scheduled for 29 September 2024, directed by Sam Mendes. The principal cast from the London production were announced as reprising their roles. Full casting was announced in July 2024.

== Cast ==
The following cast members were featured in the West End and Broadway productions:

| Character | West End | Broadway |
| Character | 2024 | 2024 |
|---|---|---|
| Veronica / Joan | Laura Donnelly | Laura Donnelly |
| Gloria | Leanne Best | Leanne Best |
| Ruby | Ophelia Lovibond | Ophelia Lovibond |
| Jillian | Helena Wilson | Helena Wilson |
| Dennis / Jack Larkin | Bryan Dick | Bryan Dick |
| Bill / Mr Halliwell | Shaun Dooley | Richard Short |
| Luther St John | Corey Johnson | David Wilson Barnes |
| Mr Potts / Joe Fogg | Richard Lumsden | Richard Lumsden |
| Penny / Biddy | Natasha Magigi | Ta'Rea Campbell |
| Young Gloria | Nancy Allsop | Nancy Allsop |
| Young Ruby | Sophia Ally | Sophia Ally |
| Young Joan | Lara McDonnell | Lara McDonnell |
| Young Jill | Nicola Turner | Nicola Turner |
| Mr Smith | Will Barratt | Max Roll |
| Mrs Smith | Georgina Hellier | Ellyn Heald |
| Tony | Alfie Jackson | Liam Bixby |
| Patty | Lucy Moran | Nancy Allsop |
| Dr Rose | Stevie Raine | Cameron Scoggins |

== Awards and nominations ==
=== 2024 West End production ===
| Year | Award | Category | Nominee | Result |
|---|---|---|---|---|
| 2024 | Laurence Olivier Awards | Best New Play | Jez Butterworth | Nominated |
| 2024 | Laurence Olivier Awards | Best Actress | Laura Donnelly | Nominated |

=== 2025 Broadway production ===
| Year | Award | Category | Nominated work | Result | Ref. |
|---|---|---|---|---|---|
| 2025 | Tony Awards | Best Play | Jez Butterworth | Nominated | |
| 2025 | Tony Awards | Best Performance by a Leading Actress in a Play | Laura Donnelly | Nominated | |
| 2025 | Tony Awards | Best Direction of a Play | Sam Mendes | Nominated | |
| 2025 | Tony Awards | Best Scenic Design of a Play | Rob Howell | Nominated | |
| 2025 | Tony Awards | Best Costume Design of a Play | Rob Howell | Nominated | |
| 2025 | Tony Awards | Best Lighting Design of a Play | Natasha Chivers | Nominated | |
| 2025 | Tony Awards | Best Sound Design of a Play | Nick Powell | Nominated | |
| 2025 | Drama Desk Award | Outstanding Lead Performance in a Play | Laura Donnelly | Won | |
| 2025 | Drama Desk Award | Outstanding Scenic Design of a Play | Rob Howell | Nominated | |
| 2025 | Dorian Awards | Outstanding Broadway Play | The Hills of California | Nominated | |
| 2025 | Dorian Awards | Outstanding Lead Performance in a Broadway Play | Laura Donnelly | Nominated | |
| 2025 | Outer Critics Circle Awards | Outstanding New Broadway Play | The Hills of California | Nominated | |
| 2025 | Outer Critics Circle Awards | Outstanding Lead Performer in a Broadway Play | Laura Donnelly | Won | |
| 2025 | Outer Critics Circle Awards | Outstanding Direction of a Play | Sam Mendes | Nominated | |
| 2025 | Outer Critics Circle Awards | Outstanding Scenic Design | Rob Howell | Nominated | |
| 2025 | Outer Critics Circle Awards | Outstanding Costume Design | Rob Howell | Nominated | |
| 2025 | Outer Critics Circle Awards | Outstanding Lighting Design | Natasha Chivers | Nominated | |
