= Fernando Andrés =

American filmmaker

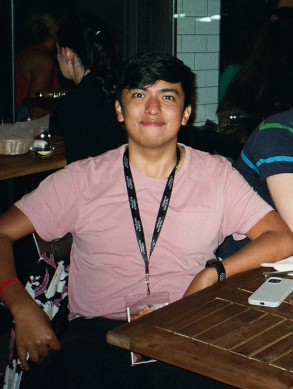
- Fernando Andrés at the 2022 Tribeca Film Festival
- Born: 1997 (age 28–29); Topeka, Kansas, U.S.
- Occupations: Filmmaker, director, screenwriter, producer
- Years active: 2019–present

Fernando Andrés (born 1997) is an American film director, screenwriter, and producer based in Austin, Texas. He is best known for his independent feature films Three Headed Beast (2022) and Rent Free (2024), both of which premiered in the U.S. Narrative Competition at the Tribeca Film Festival. His films explore relationships, sexuality, and contemporary society through a stylized, often satirical queer lens.

== Early life ==
Andrés was born to Ecuadorian parents in Topeka, Kansas in 1997. His family moved to Texas, where he developed an early interest in film and storytelling. In 2016, he moved to Austin to study film at the University of Texas, before dropping out to pursue jobs on film sets, including as a production assistant on the film Thunder Road (2018).

== Career ==
Andrés started his career with short films, notably collaborating with childhood friend Tyler Rugh. Their short Igloo (2019) was a finalist for the Sundance Ignite Fellowship.

Andrés made his feature debut with Three Headed Beast (2022), co-directed and co-written with Rugh. The film premiered at the 2022 Tribeca Film Festival, receiving critical acclaim for its visual storytelling, minimal dialogue, and exploration of queer sexuality and open relationships. Texas filmmaker David Lowery praised the film as being "bold, refreshing and exciting".

His second feature film, Rent Free (2024), is a comedic exploration of friendship, queer identity, and economic anxiety among Gen-Z young adults living in Austin. It premiered in competition at Tribeca, going on to play film festivals including Frameline, New Orleans Film Festival, and BFI Flare London, and was selected as the opening night film at Austin’s All Genders, Lifestyles, and Identities Film Festival (aGLIFF). In 2025, the film was acquired by Cinephobia Releasing for North American distribution.

== Filmography ==
=== Feature films ===
Year	Title	Director	Writer	Notes
2024	Rent Free	Yes	Yes	World premiered at Tribeca Film Festival
2022	Three Headed Beast	Yes	Yes	World premiered at Tribeca Film Festival

=== Short films ===
Year	Title	Director	Writer	Notes
2023	Knowing Me, Knowing You	Yes	Yes	Frameline47, Austin Film Festival
2019	Me & My Friend Just Want Our Pizza	Yes	Yes	Premiered on NoBudge
2019	Igloo	Yes	Yes	Sundance Ignite Fellowship finalist

== Accolades ==
- 2019 – Sundance Ignite Fellowship Finalist (Igloo)
- 2022 – Tribeca Film Festival Grand Jury Prize Nominee (Three Headed Beast)
- 2024 – Tribeca Film Festival Grand Jury Prize Nominee (Rent Free)
