= List of Kate Winslet performances =

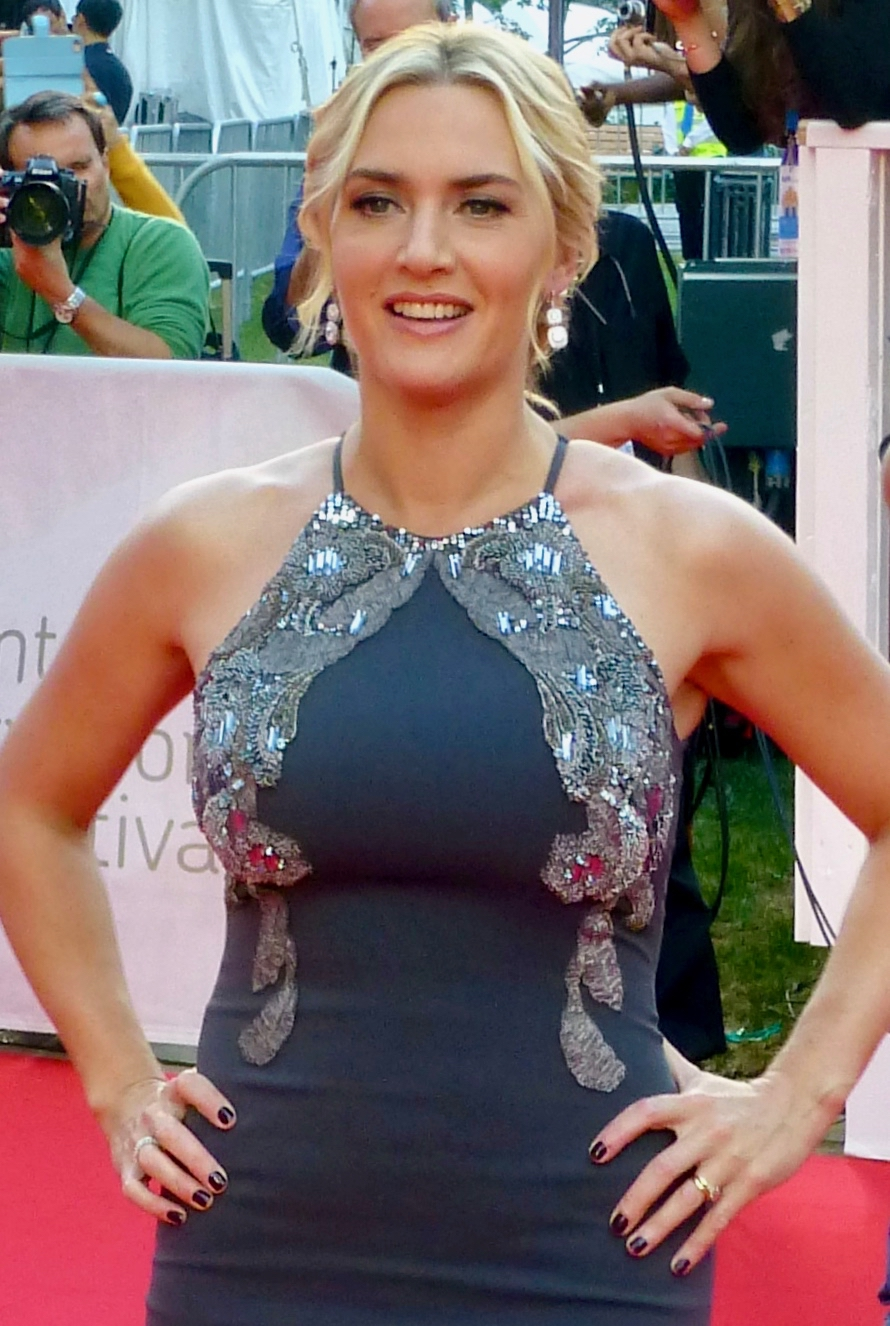
Winslet at the 2015 Toronto International Film Festival

English actress Kate Winslet made her screen debut at age 15 in the BBC series Dark Season (1991). Following more television appearances in the UK, she made her film debut with the leading role of murderer Juliet Hulme in Peter Jackson's crime film Heavenly Creatures (1994). Winslet gained wider recognition for playing Marianne Dashwood in a 1995 film adaptation of Sense and Sensibility, for which she received an Academy Award nomination and won the BAFTA Award for Best Supporting Actress. The same year, she appeared in the Royal Exchange Theatre's production of Joe Orton's farce What the Butler Saw. In 1997, she starred opposite Leonardo DiCaprio in James Cameron's romance Titanic, which emerged as the highest-grossing film of all time to that point; it established her as a star and earned her an Academy Award for Best Actress nomination.

Winslet followed Titanic with roles in small-scale period dramas which were critically acclaimed but not widely seen. She played a disillusioned single mother in Hideous Kinky (1998), an Australian woman brainwashed by a religious cult in Holy Smoke! (1999), a sexually repressed laundress in Quills (2000), and the novelist Iris Murdoch in Iris (2001). For the last of these, she received her third Academy Award nomination. Winslet was awarded a Grammy Award for narrating a short story in the children's audiobook Listen to the Storyteller (1999), and she sang the single "What If" for the 2001 animated film Christmas Carol: The Movie. The 2004 science fiction romance Eternal Sunshine of the Spotless Mind marked one of her first roles set in contemporary times, and Winslet followed it by playing Sylvia Llewelyn Davies in Finding Neverland (2004) and an unhappy housewife in Little Children (2006). She received Academy Award nominations for the first and last of these, and went on to star alongside Cameron Diaz in the commercially successful romantic comedy The Holiday (2006).

In 2008, Winslet played a 1950s housewife yearning for a better life in Revolutionary Road and a Nazi concentration camp guard in The Reader. For the latter, she was awarded the BAFTA and Academy Award for Best Actress. Winslet next played the eponymous protagonist in the HBO miniseries Mildred Pierce (2011), for which she won the Primetime Emmy Award for Outstanding Lead Actress. In 2014, Winslet portrayed Jeanine Matthews in the Divergent film series, and in 2015, she starred in The Dressmaker, which ranks among the highest-grossing Australian films. For playing Joanna Hoffman in Danny Boyle's Steve Jobs (2015), a biopic of the titular inventor, she received her third BAFTA Award and her seventh Academy Award nomination. After playing a cynical waitress in Woody Allen's drama Wonder Wheel (2017), Winslet starred as a troubled police detective in the HBO miniseries Mare of Easttown (2021), winning another Primetime Emmy Award. In 2022, she had a supporting role in Cameron's science fiction film Avatar: The Way of Water, which emerged as her second film to earn over $2 billion worldwide. She also won two BAFTA TV Awards for producing and starring in the single drama "I Am Ruth" (2022).

== Film ==
Key
†	Denotes films that have not yet been released

Year	Title	Role	Notes	Ref.
1994	Heavenly Creatures	Juliet Hulme		
1995	Sense and Sensibility	Marianne Dashwood		
1995	A Kid in King Arthur's Court	Princess Sarah		
1996	Jude	Sue Bridehead		
1996	Hamlet	Ophelia		
1997	Titanic	Rose DeWitt Bukater		
1998	Hideous Kinky	Julia		
1999	Faeries	Brigid (voice)		
1999	Holy Smoke!	Ruth Barron		
2000	Quills	Madeleine		
2001	Enigma	Hester Wallace		
2001	Iris	Young Iris Murdoch		
2001	Christmas Carol: The Movie	Belle (voice)		
2002	War Game	Mum (voice), Annie (voice)	Short film	
2003	The Life of David Gale	Bitsey Bloom		
2004	Eternal Sunshine of the Spotless Mind	Clementine Kruczynski		
2004	Finding Neverland	Sylvia Llewelyn Davies		
2005	Romance & Cigarettes	Tula		
2006	Deep Sea 3D	Narrator	Documentary film	
2006	Flushed Away	Rita Malone (voice)		
2006	All the King's Men	Anne Stanton		
2006	Little Children	Sarah Pierce		
2006	The Holiday	Iris		
2007	The Fox and the Child	Narrator	English dub	
2008	The Reader	Hanna Schmitz		
2008	Revolutionary Road	April Wheeler		
2009	A Mother's Courage: Talking Back to Autism	Narrator	Documentary film	
2011	Carnage	Nancy Cowan		
2011	Contagion	Dr. Erin Mears		
2013	Movie 43	Beth	Segment: The Catch	
2013	Labor Day	Adele Wheeler		
2014	Divergent	Jeanine Matthews		
2014	A Little Chaos	Sabine De Barra		
2015	The Divergent Series: Insurgent	Jeanine Matthews		
2015	Daisy Chain	Buttercup (voice)	Short film	
2015	Steve Jobs	Joanna Hoffman		
2015	The Dressmaker	Myrtle "Tilly" Dunnage		
2016	Triple 9	Irina Vlaslov		
2016	Collateral Beauty	Claire Wilson		
2016	The Lost Letter	Narrator	Short film	
2017	The Mountain Between Us	Alex Martin		
2017	Wonder Wheel	Ginny Rannell		
2018	Mary and the Witch's Flower	Madame Mumblechook (voice)	English dub	
2019	Birds of a Feather	Blanche (voice)		
2019	Blackbird	Jennifer		
2020	Baba Yaga	Baba Yaga (voice)	Short film	
2020	Ammonite	Mary Anning		
2020	Black Beauty	Black Beauty (voice)		
2021	Eating Our Way to Extinction	Narrator	Documentary	
2022	Eleven Days in May	Narrator	Documentary	
2022	Avatar: The Way of Water	Ronal		
2023	Lee	Lee Miller	Also producer	
2024	DreamScapes	Narrator	Documentary film	
2025	Avatar: Fire and Ash	Ronal		
2025	Goodbye June	Julia "Jules" Cheshire	Also director and producer	
2027	The Lord of the Rings: The Hunt for Gollum †	Marigol	Filming	

== Television ==
Key
†	Denotes films that have not yet been released

Year(s)	Title	Role	Notes	Ref(s).
1991	Dark Season	Reet	6 episodes	
1992	Anglo-Saxon Attitudes	Caroline Jenington	Miniseries	
1992–1993	Get Back	Eleanor Sweet	15 episodes	
1993	Casualty	Suzanne	Episode: "Family Matters"	
2004	Pride	Suki (voice)	Television film	
2004	Saturday Night Live	Host	Episode: "Kate Winslet/Eminem"	
2005	Extras	Herself	Episode: "Kate Winslet"	
2011	Mildred Pierce	Mildred Pierce	Miniseries	
2015	Running Wild with Bear Grylls	Herself	Episode: "Kate Winslet"	
2015	Snow Chick	Narrator	Television film	
2017	Diana: The Day Britain Cried	Narrator	Documentary film	
2017	Snow Bears	Narrator	Documentary film	
2019–2020	Moominvalley	Mrs Fillyjonk (voice)	6 episodes	
2021	Mare of Easttown	Mare Sheehan	Miniseries; also executive producer	
2022	I Am...	Ruth	Episode: "I Am Ruth"; also producer	
2024	The Regime	Elena Vernham	Miniseries; also executive producer	
2025	Digman!	Dr. Sandra Null (voice)	Episode: "Freud’s Couch"	
2026	Finding Harmony: A King's Vision	Narrator	Documentary film	

== Theatre ==
Year	Production	Role	Venue	Ref.
1990	Bugsy Malone	Lena Marelli	Wilde Theatre, Bracknell	
1994	What the Butler Saw	Geraldine Barclay	Royal Exchange, Manchester	
2026	The Pelicot Trial	Performer	The Young Vic	

== Video games ==
Year	Production	Role	Notes	Ref.
2015	Insurgent – Shatter Reality	Jeanine Matthews	Virtual reality Samsung Gear VR	

== Discography ==
Year	Soundtrack	Song	Label	Ref.
1994	Heavenly Creatures	"Juliet's Aria"	BMG Rights Management	
2001	Christmas Carol: The Movie	"What If"	EMI	
2005	Sandra Boynton's Dog Train	"I Need a Nap"	Boynton Recordings	

== Audiobook ==
Year	Title	Role	Ref(s).
1995	Sense and Sensibility	Narrator	
1999	Listen to the Storyteller (Note: Winslet narrated the short story "The Face in the Lake".)	Narrator	
2012	Thérèse Raquin	Narrator	
2012	You're a Bad Man, Mr Gum!	Narrator	
2014	Matilda	Narrator	
2014	The Magic Finger	Narrator	
2023	Dark Season: Legacy Rising	Reet	

== Bibliography ==
Year	Title	ISBN	Ref(s).
2012	The Golden Hat: Talking Back to Autism	ISBN 978-1-4516-4543-9	

== See also ==
- List of awards and nominations received by Kate Winslet
