= List of awards and nominations received by Kate Winslet =

Kate Winslet awards and nominations
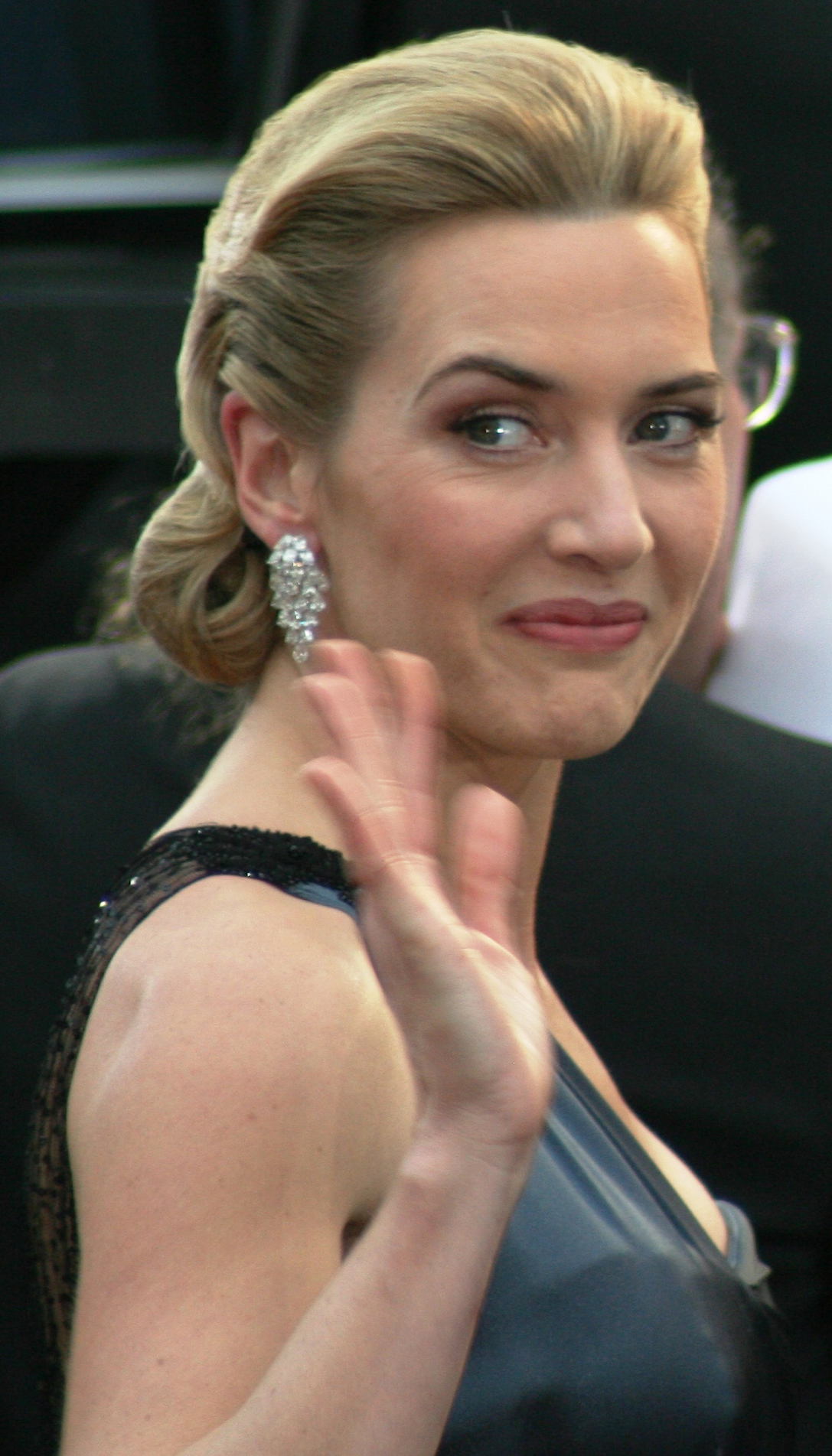
- Winslet at the 81st Academy Awards
Awards and nominations
Award	Wins	Nominations
Academy Awards	1	7
Actor Awards	4	13
BAFTA Awards	5	13
Critics' Choice Awards	3	7
Emmy Awards	2	4
Golden Globe Awards	5	14
Grammy Awards	1	1
Producers Guild Awards	1	1

Totals (Note: Certain award groups do not simply award one winner. They acknowledge several different recipients, have runners-up, and have third place. Since this is a specific recognition and is different from losing an award, runner-up mentions are considered wins in this award tally. For simplification and to avoid errors, each award in this list has been presumed to have had a prior nomination.)
- Wins: 101
- Nominations: 241

Kate Winslet is an English actress who has won an Academy Award, five BAFTA Awards, two Emmy Awards, a Grammy Award, three Critics' Choice Awards, five Golden Globe Awards, four Screen Actors Guild Awards and a Producers Guild Award. She is one of the few actresses to have won three of the four major American entertainment awards (EGOT), with her Academy Award, Emmy Award, and Grammy Award wins.

Winslet is the youngest person to acquire six Academy Award nominations, with seven nominations in total. She won the Academy Award for Best Actress playing Hanna Schmitz, a Nazi guard in the drama The Reader (2008). She was Oscar-nominated for her portrayals of Marianne Dashwood in Sense and Sensibility (1995), Rose Dewitt Bukater in Titanic (1997), Iris Murdoch in Iris (2001), the free-spirited Clementine Kruczynski in Eternal Sunshine of the Spotless Mind (2004), a suburban housewife in Little Children (2006), and Joanna Hoffman in Steve Jobs (2015).

She is the tenth-youngest Best Actress nominee for her role in Titanic (1997), receiving the nomination at the age of 22. Winslet is the only actress to receive two Academy Award nominations as the younger versions of the characters played by fellow nominees Gloria Stuart, as Rose DeWitt Bukater, in Titanic, and Judi Dench, as Iris Murdoch, in Iris. She is only the second actress, after Sigourney Weaver, to win a Golden Globe for Best Actress (Drama) (for Revolutionary Road) and a Golden Globe for Best Supporting Actress (for The Reader) in the same year.

For her performances on television, Winslet won two Primetime Emmy Awards for Outstanding Lead Actress in a Limited Series or Movie for her portrayals as a self-sacrificing mother in the HBO limited drama series Mildred Pierce (2011), and a uncompromising detective sergeant in the HBO limited crime series Mare of Easttown (2021). She was Emmy-nominated for her comedic guest spot as herself in Extras (2006). She won the British Academy Television Awards for Best Single Drama and Best Actress for her work in the Channel 4 anthology series I Am Ruth (2022).

Winslet was appointed as Commander of the Order of the British Empire (CBE) by Queen Elizabeth II in 2012 for services to drama. Over her career she has received several honorary awards such as the Britannia Award in 2007, a Santa Barbara International Film Festival Award in 2009, an Honorary César Award in 2012, and a star on the Hollywood Walk of Fame in 2014 with Kathy Bates and Shailene Woodley as guest speakers. For her humanitarian work, she received the Yo Dona award for her work in helping to eliminate barriers for autistic people with the Golden Hat Foundation in 2011, and the SAG-AFTRA Actors Inspiration Award for her entertainment and philanthropic work in 2017.

== Major associations ==
=== Academy Awards ===
Year	Category	Nominated work	Result	Ref.
1996	Best Supporting Actress	Sense and Sensibility	Nominated	
1998	Best Actress	Titanic	Nominated	
2002	Best Supporting Actress	Iris	Nominated	
2005	Best Actress	Eternal Sunshine of the Spotless Mind	Nominated	
2007	Best Actress	Little Children	Nominated	
2009	Best Actress	The Reader	Won	
2016	Best Supporting Actress	Steve Jobs	Nominated	

=== Actor Awards ===
Year	Category	Nominated work	Result	Ref.
1996	Outstanding Female Actor in a Supporting Role	Sense and Sensibility	Won	
1996	Outstanding Cast in a Motion Picture (Note: Shared with Hugh Grant, Alan Rickman, and Emma Thompson.)	Sense and Sensibility	Nominated	
1998	Outstanding Female Actor in a Leading Role	Titanic	Nominated	
1998	Outstanding Cast in a Motion Picture (Note: Shared with Suzy Amis, Kathy Bates, Leonardo DiCaprio, Frances Fisher, Bernard Fox, Victor Garber, Bernard Hill, Jonathan Hyde, Danny Nucci, Bill Paxton, Gloria Stuart, David Warner, and Billy Zane.)	Titanic	Nominated	
2001	Outstanding Female Actor in a Supporting Role	Quills	Nominated	
2005	Outstanding Cast in a Motion Picture (Note: Shared with Julie Christie, Johnny Depp, Freddie Highmore, Dustin Hoffman, Radha Mitchell, Joe Prospero, Nick Roud, and Luke Spill.)	Finding Neverland	Nominated	
2005	Outstanding Female Actor in a Leading Role	Eternal Sunshine of the Spotless Mind	Nominated	
2007	Outstanding Female Actor in a Leading Role	Little Children	Nominated	
2009	Outstanding Female Actor in a Leading Role	Revolutionary Road	Nominated	
2009	Outstanding Female Actor in a Supporting Role	The Reader	Won	
2012	Outstanding Female Actor in a Miniseries or TV Movie	Mildred Pierce	Won	
2016	Outstanding Female Actor in a Supporting Role	Steve Jobs	Nominated	
2022	Outstanding Female Actor in a Miniseries or TV Movie	Mare of Easttown	Won	

=== BAFTA Awards ===
Year	Category	Nominated work	Result	Ref.
British Academy Film Awards
1996	Best Actress in a Supporting Role	Sense and Sensibility	Won	
2002	Best Actress in a Supporting Role	Iris	Nominated	
2005	Best Actress in a Leading Role	Eternal Sunshine of the Spotless Mind	Nominated	
2005	Best Actress in a Leading Role	Finding Neverland	Nominated	
2007	Best Actress in a Leading Role	Little Children	Nominated	
2009	Best Actress in a Leading Role	The Reader	Won	
2009	Best Actress in a Leading Role	Revolutionary Road	Nominated	
2016	Best Actress in a Supporting Role	Steve Jobs	Won	
2025	Best British Film (Note: Shared with Ellen Kuras, Kate Solomon, Liz Hannah, Marion Hume, John Coll and Lem Dobbs.) (as a producer)	Lee	Nominated	
British Academy Television Awards
2022	Best Actress	Mare of Easttown	Nominated	
2022	Best International Programme	Mare of Easttown	Nominated	
2023	Best Actress	I Am Ruth	Won	
2023	Best Single Drama	I Am Ruth	Won	

=== Critics' Choice Awards ===
Year	Category	Nominated work	Result	Ref.
Critics' Choice Movie Awards
2004	Best Actress	Eternal Sunshine of the Spotless Mind	Nominated	
2004	Best Supporting Actress	Finding Neverland	Nominated	
2006	Best Actress	Little Children	Nominated	
2008	Best Supporting Actress	The Reader	Won	
2015	Best Supporting Actress	Steve Jobs	Nominated	
Critics' Choice Television Awards
2022	Best Television Movie or Miniseries	Mare of Easttown	Won	
2022	Best Actress in a Television Movie or Miniseries	Mare of Easttown	Won	

=== Emmy Awards ===
Year	Category	Nominated work	Result	Ref.
Primetime Emmy Awards
2006	Outstanding Guest Actress in a Comedy Series	Extras	Nominated	
2011	Outstanding Lead Actress in a Miniseries or Movie	Mildred Pierce	Won	
2021	Outstanding Limited Series (Note: Shared with Paul Lee, Mark Roybal, Craig Zobel, Brad Ingelsby, Gavin O'Connor, Gordon Gray, Ron Schmidt, and Karen Wacker.) (as a producer)	Mare of Easttown	Nominated	
2021	Outstanding Lead Actress in a Limited Series or Movie	Mare of Easttown	Won	

=== Golden Globe Awards ===
Year	Category	Nominated work	Result	Ref.
Film
1996	Best Supporting Actress – Motion Picture	Sense and Sensibility	Nominated	
1998	Best Actress in a Motion Picture – Drama	Titanic	Nominated	
2002	Best Supporting Actress – Motion Picture	Iris	Nominated	
2005	Best Actress in a Motion Picture – Musical or Comedy	Eternal Sunshine of the Spotless Mind	Nominated	
2007	Best Actress in a Motion Picture – Drama	Little Children	Nominated	
2009	Best Actress in a Motion Picture – Drama	Revolutionary Road	Won	
2009	Best Supporting Actress – Motion Picture	The Reader	Won	
2012	Best Actress in a Motion Picture – Musical or Comedy	Carnage	Nominated	
2012	Best Actress in a Miniseries or Motion Picture – Television	Mildred Pierce	Won	
2014	Best Actress in a Motion Picture – Drama	Labor Day	Nominated	
2016	Best Supporting Actress – Motion Picture	Steve Jobs	Won	
2022	Best Actress in a Miniseries or Motion Picture – Television	Mare of Easttown	Won	
2024	Best Actress in a Miniseries or Motion Picture – Television	The Regime	Nominated	
2024	Best Actress in a Motion Picture – Drama	Lee	Nominated	

=== Grammy Awards ===
Year	Category	Nominated work	Result	Ref.
2000	Best Spoken Word Album for Children (Note: Winslet narrated the story "The Face in the Lake") (Note: Shared with Steven Epstein, David Frost, Graham Greene, and Wynton Marsalis.)	Listen to the Storyteller	Won	

== Critic associations ==
Organizations	Year	Category	Work	Result	Ref.
Austin Film Critics Association	2015	Best Supporting Actress	Steve Jobs	Nominated	
Australian Film Critics Association	2015	Best Actress	The Dressmaker	Won	
Boston Society of Film Critics	2011	Best Cast (Note: Shared with Jodie Foster, John C. Reilly, and Christoph Waltz.)	Carnage	Won	
Bravo Otto	1998	Best Actress	Herself	Won	
Central Ohio Film Critics Association	2015	Best Supporting Actress	Steve Jobs	Nominated	
Chicago Film Critics Association	2006	Best Actress	Little Children	Nominated	
Chicago Film Critics Association	2008	Best Supporting Actress	The Reader	Won	
Dallas–Fort Worth Film Critics Association	2004	Best Actress	Eternal Sunshine of the Spotless Mind	3rd place	
Dallas–Fort Worth Film Critics Association	2006	Best Actress	Little Children	Nominated	
Dallas–Fort Worth Film Critics Association	2008	Best Actress	Revolutionary Road	Nominated	
Dallas–Fort Worth Film Critics Association	2015	Best Supporting Actress	Steve Jobs	3rd Place	
Denver Film Critics Society	2016	Best Supporting Actress	Steve Jobs	Nominated	
Detroit Film Critics Society	2008	Best Actress	Revolutionary Road	Won	
Detroit Film Critics Society	2008	Best Ensemble (Note: Shared with Dylan Baker, Kathy Bates, Leonardo DiCaprio, Kathryn Hahn, David Harbour, Zoe Kazan, and Michael Shannon.)	Revolutionary Road	Nominated	
Detroit Film Critics Society	2011	Best Ensemble	Carnage	Won	
Dublin Film Critics Circle	2006	Best Actress	Little Children	Nominated	
Film Critics Circle of Australia	2015	Best Actress	The Dressmaker	Won	
Georgia Film Critics Association	2011	Best Ensemble (Note: Shared with Marion Cotillard, Bryan Cranston, Matt Damon, Jennifer Ehle, Laurence Fishburne, John Hawkes, Sanaa Lathan, Jude Law, and Gwyneth Paltrow.)	Contagion	Nominated	
Georgia Film Critics Association	2016	Best Supporting Actress	Steve Jobs	Nominated	
Hollywood Critics Association	2021	Best Actress in a Limited Series or TV Movie	Mare of Easttown	Nominated	
Hollywood Critics Association	2021	Best Limited Series or TV Movie	Mare of Easttown	Won	
Houston Film Critics Society	2008	Best Actress in a Leading Role	Revolutionary Road	Nominated	
Houston Film Critics Society	2015	Best Actress in a Supporting Role	Steve Jobs	Nominated	
Indiana Film Journalists Association	2016	Best Supporting Actress	Steve Jobs	Nominated	
International Cinephile Society	2005	Best Actress	Eternal Sunshine of the Spotless Mind	Won	
Iowa Film Critics Association	2016	Best Supporting Actress	Steve Jobs	Won	
Kansas City Film Critics Circle	2016	Best Supporting Actress	Steve Jobs	Nominated	
Las Vegas Film Critics Society	2016	Best Supporting Actress	Steve Jobs	Nominated	
London Film Critics' Circle	1995	British Actress of the Year	Heavenly Creatures	Won	
London Film Critics' Circle	1998	British Actress of the Year	Titanic	Nominated	
London Film Critics' Circle	2001	British Actress of the Year	Quills	Nominated	
London Film Critics' Circle	2004	British Actress of the Year	Eternal Sunshine of the Spotless Mind	Won	
London Film Critics' Circle	2006	British Actress of the Year	Little Children	Nominated	
London Film Critics' Circle	2008	British Actress of the Year	The Reader / Revolutionary Road	Nominated	
London Film Critics' Circle	2008	Best Actress of the Year	The Reader / Revolutionary Road	Won	
London Film Critics' Circle	2015	British Actress of the Year	Steve Jobs / The Dressmaker / A Little Chaos	Nominated	
London Film Critics' Circle	2015	Best Supporting Actress of the Year	Steve Jobs	Won	
London Film Critics' Circle	2017	Dilys Powell Award	Herself	Won	
Los Angeles Film Critics Association	2001	Best Supporting Actress	Iris	Won	
National Society of Film Critics	1999	Best Actress	Holy Smoke!	Nominated	
National Society of Film Critics	2015	Best Supporting Actress	Steve Jobs	3rd Place	
New York Film Critics Circle	2004	Best Actress	Holy Smoke!	Runner-up	
New York Film Critics Circle	2004	Best Actress	Eternal Sunshine of the Spotless Mind	Runner-up	
New York Film Critics Circle	2008	Best Actress	Revolutionary Road	Nominated	
New York Film Critics Online Circle	2015	Best Supporting Actress	Steve Jobs	Runner-up	
North Dakota Film Society	2021	Best Actress	Ammonite	Nominated	
Online Film Critics Society	1997	Best Actress	Titanic	Nominated	
Online Film Critics Society	2004	Best Actress	Eternal Sunshine of the Spotless Mind	Won	
Online Film Critics Society	2006	Best Actress	Little Children	Nominated	
Online Film Critics Society	2008	Best Supporting Actress	The Reader	Nominated	
Online Film Critics Society	2008	Best Actress	Revolutionary Road	Nominated	
Online Film Critics Society	2015	Best Supporting Actress	Steve Jobs	Nominated	
Phoenix Film Critics Society	2011	Best Ensemble	Contagion	Nominated	
Phoenix Film Critics Society	2015	Best Supporting Actress	Steve Jobs	Nominated	
Phoenix Film Critics Circle	2015	Best Supporting Actress	Steve Jobs	Nominated	
San Diego Film Critics Society	2008	Best Actress	The Reader	Won	
San Diego Film Critics Society	2011	Best Ensemble	Carnage	Nominated	
Seattle Film Critics Awards	2016	Best Supporting Actress	Steve Jobs	Nominated	
Seattle Film Critics Awards	2016	Best Ensemble (Note: Shared with Jeff Daniels, Michael Fassbender, Perla Haney-Jardine, Makenzie Moss, John Ortiz, Seth Rogen, Adam Shapiro, Sarah Snook, Ripley Sobo, Michael Stuhlbarg, and Katherine Waterston.)	Steve Jobs	Nominated	
St. Louis Gateway Film Critics Association	2006	Best Actress	Little Children	Nominated	
St. Louis Gateway Film Critics Association	2008	Best Actress	The Reader / Revolutionary Road	Won	
St. Louis Gateway Film Critics Association	2015	Best Supporting Actress	Steve Jobs	Nominated	
Southeastern Film Critics Association	2008	Best Actress	The Reader	Runner-up	
Southeastern Film Critics Association	2016	Best Supporting Actress	Steve Jobs	Runner-up	
Television Critics Association Awards	2021	Outstanding Individual Achievement in Drama	Mare of Easttown	Nominated	
Television Critics Association Awards	2021	Outstanding New Program of the Year	Mare of Easttown	Nominated	
Television Critics Association Awards	2021	Outstanding Miniseries or Movie	Mare of Easttown	Won	
Television Critics Association Awards	2021	Outstanding Program of the Year	Mare of Easttown	Nominated	
Vancouver Film Critics Circle	2006	Best Actress	Little Children	Nominated	
Vancouver Film Critics Circle	2008	Best Actress	The Reader / Revolutionary Road	Won	
Washington D.C. Area Film Critics Association	2004	Best Actress	Eternal Sunshine of the Spotless Mind	Nominated	
Washington D.C. Area Film Critics Association	2004	Best Ensemble (Note: Shared with Jim Carrey, Kirsten Dunst, Mark Ruffalo, Tom Wilkinson, and Elijah Wood.)	Eternal Sunshine of the Spotless Mind	Won	
Washington D.C. Area Film Critics Association	2015	Best Supporting Actress	Steve Jobs	Nominated	
Washington D.C. Area Film Critics Association	2015	Best Ensemble	Steve Jobs	Nominated	
Women Film Critics Circle	2021	Best Screen Couple (Note: Shared with Saoirse Ronan)	Ammonite	Won	

== Festival awards ==
Organizations	Year	Category	Work	Result	Ref.
Palm Springs International Film Festival	2007	Desert Palm Achievement Award for Acting	Little Children	Won	
Palm Springs International Film Festival	2009	Best Ensemble	Revolutionary Road	Won	
Sannio FilmFes	2009	Best Actress	The Reader	Nominated	
Santa Barbara International Film Festival	2005	Outstanding Performance of the Year Award	Eternal Sunshine of the Spotless Mind / Finding Neverland	Won	
Santa Barbara International Film Festival	2009	Montecito Award	Revolutionary Road	Won	
Toronto Film Festival	2020	TIFF Tribute of the Year Award	Ammonite	Honored	
Venice Film Festival	1999	Elvira Notari Prize (Note: Shared with Jane Campion)	Holy Smoke!	Won	

== Miscellaneous awards ==
Organizations	Year	Category	Work	Result	Ref.
AACTA Awards	2015	Best Lead Actress in a Film – Cinema	The Dressmaker	Won	
AACTA Awards	2016	Best International Supporting Actress in a Film – Cinema	Steve Jobs	Nominated	
AACTA Awards	2022	Best International Lead Actress in a Show – Television	Mare of Easttown	Won	
AACTA Awards	2022	Best International Dramatic Show – Television	Mare of Easttown	Nominated	
AACTA Awards	2024	Best International Actress in a Film – Cinema	Lee	Nominated	
Alliance of Women Film Journalists	2006	Best Actress in a Dramatic Performance	Little Children	Nominated	
Alliance of Women Film Journalists	2006	Best Ensemble Cast (Note: Shared with Jane Adams, Trini Alvarado, Jennifer Connelly, Marsha Dietlein, Gregg Edelman, Noah Emmerich, Ty Simpkins, Phyllis Somerville, and Patrick Wilson.)	Little Children	Nominated	
Alliance of Women Film Journalists	2009	Best Actress	The Reader / Revolutionary Road	Won	
Alliance of Women Film Journalists	2009	Outstanding Achievement by a Woman in the Film Industry	The Reader / Revolutionary Road	Nominated	
Alliance of Women Film Journalists	2009	Bravest Performance	The Reader	Nominated	
Alliance of Women Film Journalists	2009	Best Depiction of Nudity or Sexuality (Note: Shared with David Kross.)	The Reader	Won	
Alliance of Women Film Journalists	2015	Best Supporting Actress	Steve Jobs	Nominated	
Alliance of Women Film Journalists	2017	Actress Most in Need of a New Agent	Wonder Wheel / The Mountain Between Us	Won	
Britannia Awards	2007	British Artist of the Year	Herself	Won	
Bambi Awards	2009	Best Actress – International	The Reader	Won	
Blockbuster Entertainment Awards	1998	Favorite Actress – Drama	Titanic	Won	
Blockbuster Entertainment Awards	2001	Favorite Actress – Drama	Quills	Nominated	
British Independent Film Awards	2001	Best Actress in a British Independent Film	Enigma	Nominated	
British Independent Film Awards	2015	Variety Award	Steve Jobs	Won	
Empire Awards	1996	Best British Actress	Heavenly Creatures	Won	
Empire Awards	1998	Best British Actress	Hamlet	Won	
Empire Awards	1999	Best British Actress	Titanic	Won	
Empire Awards	2000	Best British Actress	Hideous Kinky	Nominated	
Empire Awards	2001	Best Actress	Quills	Nominated	
Empire Awards	2002	Best British Actress	Enigma	Won	
Empire Awards	2005	Best British Actress	Eternal Sunshine of the Spotless Mind	Won	
Empire Awards	2007	Best Actress	Little Children	Nominated	
European Film Awards	1998	Outstanding European Achievement in World Cinema	Titanic	Nominated	
European Film Awards	1998	People's Choice Award for Best Actress	Titanic	Won	
European Film Awards	2002	People's Choice Award for Best Actress	Iris	Won	
European Film Awards	2009	Best Actress	The Reader	Won	
European Film Awards	2012	Best Actress	Carnage	Nominated	
European Film Awards	1998	Jameson People's Choice Award – Best Actress	Titanic	Won	
European Film Awards	1998	Outstanding Achievement in World Cinema	Titanic	Nominated	
European Film Awards	2002	Jameson People's Choice Award – Best Actress	Iris	Won	
European Film Awards	2009	Best Actress	The Reader	Won	
European Film Awards	2012	Best Actress	Carnage	Nominated	
Evening Standard British Film Awards	1996	Best Actress	Sense and Sensibility and Jude	Won	
Evening Standard British Film Awards	2001	Best Actress	Quills, Enigma, and Iris	Won	
Evening Standard British Film Awards	2009	Best Actress	The Reader and Revolutionary Road	Nominated	
Dorian Awards	2012	TV Performance of the Year	Mildred Pierce	Nominated	
Dorian Awards	2021	Best TV Performance	Mare of Easttown	Nominated	
Earphones Awards	2014	Best Audio-Book Performance	Matilda	Won	
Goldene Kamera Awards	2001	Best International Actress	Titanic	Won	
Hollywood Film Awards	2017	Hollywood Actress Award	Wonder Wheel	Won	
Irish Film & Television Academy	2007	Pantene Best International Actress People's Choice	The Holiday	Nominated	
Italian Online Movie Awards	2005	Best Actress	Eternal Sunshine of the Spotless Mind	Won	
Italian Online Movie Awards	2009	Best Actress	Revolutionary Road	Won	
Manchester Evening News Theatre Awards	1994	Best Supporting Actress in a Play	What the Butler Saw	Nominated	
MTV Movie Awards	1998	Best Female Performance	Titanic	Nominated	
MTV Movie Awards	1998	Best On-Screen Duo (Note: Shared with Leonardo DiCaprio.)	Titanic	Nominated	
MTV Movie Awards	1998	Best Kiss	Titanic	Nominated	
MTV Movie Awards	2009	Best Female Performance	The Reader	Nominated	
New Zealand film and television awards	1995	Best Foreign Performer	Heavenly Creatures	Won	
Odyssey Awards	2014	Best Audio-Book Performance	Matilda	Won	
Online Film & Television Association Awards	1997	Best Actress	Titanic	Won	
Online Film & Television Association Awards	1997	Best Drama Actress	Titanic	Won	
Online Film & Television Association Awards	2004	Best Actress	Eternal Sunshine of the Spotless Mind	Nominated	
Online Film & Television Association Awards	2006	Best Actress	Little Children	Nominated	
Online Film & Television Association Awards	2008	Best Actress	Revolutionary Road	Nominated	
Online Film & Television Association Awards	2008	Best Supporting Actress	The Reader	Won	
Online Film & Television Association Awards	2010	Best Actress in a Motion Picture or Miniseries	Mildred Pierce	Won	
Online Film & Television Association Awards	2015	Best Supporting Actress	Steve Jobs	Nominated	
People's Choice Awards	2005	Favorite Leading Lady	Eternal Sunshine of the Spotless Mind	Nominated	
People's Choice Awards	2005	Favorite On-Screen Chemistry (Note: Shared with Jim Carrey.)	Eternal Sunshine of the Spotless Mind	Nominated	
People's Choice Awards	2005	Favorite On-Screen Chemistry (Note: Shared with Johnny Depp.)	Finding Neverland	Nominated	
People's Choice Awards	2015	Favorite Dramatic Movie Actress	Steve Jobs	Nominated	
Producers Guild of America Awards	2022	Outstanding Producer of Limited Series Television (Note: Shared with Paul Lee, Mark Roybal, Craig Zobel, Brad Ingelsby, Ron Schmidt, and Karen Wacker.)	Mare of Easttown	Won	
Rembrandt Awards	2011	Best International Actress	Carnage	Nominated	
Royal Television Society Programme Awards	2023	Best Female Leading Actor	I Am Ruth	Won	
Satellite Awards	1997	Best Supporting Actress in a Film	Hamlet	Nominated	
Satellite Awards	1998	Best Actress in a Film	Titanic	Nominated	
Satellite Awards	2001	Best Supporting Actress in a Film	Quills	Nominated	
Satellite Awards	2002	Best Supporting Actress in a Film	Iris	Nominated	
Satellite Awards	2005	Best Actress in a Film	Eternal Sunshine of the Spotless Mind	Nominated	
Satellite Awards	2006	Best Actress in a Film	Little Children	Nominated	
Satellite Awards	2008	Best Actress in a Film	The Reader	Nominated	
Satellite Awards	2011	Best Actress in a Miniseries or Television Film	Mildred Pierce	Won	
Satellite Awards	2011	Best Supporting Actress in a Film	Carnage	Nominated	
Satellite Awards	2015	Best Supporting Actress in a Film	Steve Jobs	Nominated	
Satellite Awards	2021	Best Actress in a Film	Ammonite	Nominated	
Satellite Awards	2022	Best Miniseries or Television Film	Mare of Easttown	Won	
Satellite Awards	2022	Best Actress in a Miniseries or Television Film	Mare of Easttown	Won	
Saturn Awards	2005	Best Actress	Eternal Sunshine of the Spotless Mind	Nominated	
Teen Choice Awards	2005	Choice Movie: Drama Actress	Finding Neverland	Nominated	
Teen Choice Awards	2014	Choice Movie: Villain	Divergent	Nominated	
Teen Choice Awards	2015	Choice Movie: Villain	The Divergent Series: Insurgent	Nominated	
Variety Club of Great Britain	1999	Film Actress of the Year	Herself	Won	
Women in Film Honors	2024	Crystal Award for Advocacy in Film (Note: Shared with Ellen Kuras.)	Lee	Won	

== Honorary awards ==
Organizations	Year	Notes	Result	Ref.
Britannia Awards	2007	British Artist of the Year	Honored	
British Academy of Film and Television Arts	2015	"BAFTA A Life in Pictures" Retrospective	Honored	
César Awards	2012	Honorary César	Honored	
Elle Women in Hollywood Awards	2015	Woman of the Year	Honored	
Gotham Awards	2006	Gala Tribute	Honored	
Harper's Bazaar Women of the Year Awards	2015	British Icon Award	Honored	
Hollywood Walk of Fame	2014	Star inducted at 6262 Hollywood Blvd	inductee	
Munich Film Festival	2024	CineMerit Award for her Lifetime Career	Honored	
New York Film Festival	2015	Tribute dinner at Film Society of Lincoln Center	Honored	
Commander of the Order of the British Empire	2012	She was appointed as CBE by Queen Elizabeth II the for services to drama	Honored	
Santa Barbara International Film Festival	2009	Modern Master (Montecito) Award	Honored	
SAG-AFTRA	2017	Actors Inspiration Award by for both her entertainment and philanthropic work	Honored	
Yo Dona Award	2011	"Best Humanitarian Work" for her relationship with the Golden Hat Foundation	Honored	

== See also ==
- List of British actors
- List of Academy Award winners and nominees from Great Britain
- List of oldest and youngest Academy Award winners and nominees – Youngest nominees for Best Actress in a Leading Role
- List of actors with Academy Award nominations
- List of actors with two or more Academy Award nominations in acting categories
- List of Academy Award records
- List of Golden Globe winners
- List of EGOT winners – People who have won Emmy, Grammy, Oscar and Tony Awards
- List of Kate Winslet performances
