= Finding Harmony: A King's Vision =

2026 documentary involving King Charles III

- Directed by: Nicolas Brown
- Starring: Charles III
- Narrated by: Kate Winslet
- Distributed by: Amazon Prime Video
- Release date: 6 February 2026
- Running time: 90 minutes
- Country: United Kingdom
- Language: English

Finding Harmony: A King's Vision is a documentary examining King Charles III's long‑standing interest in the philosophy of harmony. Directed by Nicolas Brown and produced by Passion Planet for Amazon Prime Video, the film is narrated by actress Kate Winslet. It follows Charles's efforts to promote an approach to life that stresses the connection between people and the natural world and the need for ecological balance. The documentary was released on 6 February 2026.

== Background ==
Prime Video and The King's Foundation announced the documentary as a project examining King Charles III's long-standing interest in the philosophy of harmony. Developed by Passion Planet, the film explores the King's view that humanity is part of the natural world and that ecological balance underpins human wellbeing and prosperity. The documentary draws on the work of The King's Foundation, founded by Charles in 1990, which has developed Dumfries House in Ayrshire into a practical demonstration of Harmony principles. The project was conceived to mark the Foundation's 35th anniversary and to illustrate how the Harmony philosophy has informed environmental, cultural, and community initiatives in the United Kingdom and internationally. Kate Winslet, an actress and ambassador for the Foundation, narrates the film.

== Production ==
The documentary was produced by Passion Planet for Prime Video and directed by Nicolas Brown. Filming began in early 2025, combining new interviews, location footage, and archival material. The production team worked with The King's Foundation to access sites associated with the Harmony philosophy, including Dumfries House in Ayrshire. Additional filming took place internationally to document projects influenced by Harmony principles in areas such as agriculture, forestry, and education.

A premiere screening was hosted by King Charles and Queen Camilla at Windsor Castle on 28 January 2026, the first time a film premiere had been held at a royal residence.

== Content ==
The documentary outlines the principles of Charles's philosophy of harmony and examines how it has been applied throughout his public life. It follows projects supported by The King's Foundation in the United Kingdom and overseas, highlighting themes such as ecological balance, sustainable land use, traditional skills, and community regeneration. Sequences filmed at Dumfries House, Highgrove, and other locations illustrate how the harmony approach is put into practice, while international examples show the philosophy's application in areas including agriculture, forestry, and education. Archival footage charts the development of his environmental advocacy, and interviews and observational material demonstrate the philosophy's influence on contemporary initiatives.

== Release and reception ==
=== Release ===
Finding Harmony: A King's Vision was released on Prime Video on 6 February 2026. The documentary became available to stream in the United Kingdom and internationally on the same date.

=== Reception ===
The documentary ranked No. 2 in the UK Amazon Prime Video movie charts the day after its release.

It received generally positive reviews from critics. Stuart Heritage of The Guardian gave the documentary three stars out of five, calling it "intensely frustrating to watch" and criticising its "fawning tone", while acknowledging its environmental message. Patrick Smith of The Independent also gave the documentary three stars out of five, describing it as a "glossy" and at times "hagiographic" portrait, but calling it a "powerful call to action" on climate change. Carol Midgley of The Times gave the documentary three stars out of five, calling it a "decent, gentle film" that shows Charles's "utter sincerity", though she suggested its emphasis on "harmony" could seem "a little cultish". Kate Halstead of the non-profit organisation Common Sense Media also gave the documentary three stars out of five, writing that it "doesn't quite make the impact it could" and may feel "a little reverential", while acknowledging its "important messages". Anurag Singh Bohra of India Today called the documentary a "visually arresting" and "measured" environmental plea, praising its cinematography and describing it as "essential viewing". Michael D. Shear of The New York Times noted that Charles described his efforts as "a bit of an uphill struggle", highlighting his long-standing environmental activism and praising the documentary's depiction of his efforts to promote "harmony".
