= Christmas Carol: The Movie =

2001 animated film by Jimmy Murakami

- Original British quad poster
- Directed by: Jimmy T. Murakami
- Written by: Robert Llewellyn; Piet Kroon
- Based on: A Christmas Carol by Charles Dickens
- Produced by: Iain Harvey
- Starring: Simon Callow; Kate Winslet; Nicolas Cage; Jane Horrocks; Rhys Ifans; Michael Gambon; Juliet Stevenson
- Edited by: Taylor Grant
- Music by: Julian Nott
- Production companies: Pathé; Winchester Films; Illuminated Film Company; FilmFour; UK Film Council
- Distributed by: Pathé Distribution
- Release dates: 15 September 2001 (Toronto International Film Festival); 7 December 2001 (United Kingdom)
- Running time: 82 minutes
- Country: United Kingdom
- Language: English
- Budget: £6.1 million
- Box office: $266,475

Christmas Carol: The Movie is a 2001 British live-action/animated film based on Charles Dickens's 1843 novella A Christmas Carol. Directed by Jimmy T. Murakami, the film features the voices of numerous actors including Simon Callow, Kate Winslet (who also sang the film's theme "What If"), Kate's sister Beth Winslet, and Nicolas Cage. The film was a critical and commercial failure upon release.

This version differs from others, in that Scrooge is given another chance with the love of his life, Belle, who ended their engagement in their youth after he was corrupted by greed; they later meet again after the three spirits have reformed Scrooge and he is now kind and generous, causing Belle to love him again. Both Belle and Old Joe notably have bigger roles in the film. Unlike the book as well as other film adaptations, Belle does not marry and have children with another man. She is a nurse. Old Joe is a henchman of Scrooge who arrests or robs people who owe Scrooge debt but Scrooge fires him after mending his ways.

Also in the film, Marley's ghost haunts Scrooge before he goes home and Scrooge is notably younger as he has auburn hair and is middle-aged rather than being elderly. He also shows kindness towards a mouse that appears throughout the film.

== Plot ==
In 1867, an audience gathered in a cinema in Boston to hear Charles Dickens tell the story of "A Christmas Carol".

One Christmas Eve in Victorian London, the merriment is not felt by rich moneylender Ebenezer Scrooge, who orders criminal Old Joe to arrest his debt-ridden clients and lock them in a debtors' prison, including Dr. Lambert of a local children's hospital when its debts have been transferred to Scrooge. Learning this nurse Belle, who was once engaged to Scrooge, writes a letter to Scrooge pleading for forgiveness, which she leaves with his clerk, Bob Cratchit. Scrooge rejects an invitation to Christmas dinner from his nephew Fred and throws cold water over a group of carolers, including Bob's youngest son Tiny Tim, who gets pneumonia as a result.

After Bob leaves the office, Scrooge is haunted by the ghost of his late business partner, Jacob Marley, who wears a chain as punishment for his selfishness when he was alive. He tells Scrooge that he will suffer the same fate unless he changes his ways, and that he will be visited by three spirits beginning that night. Despite this, Scrooge subsequently refuses to donate to charity, telling the fundraisers that he supports the prisons and workhouses and believes that the poor are better off dead and should die to 'decrease the surplus population'.

That night, when Scrooge goes to bed, he is visited by the Ghost of Christmas Past, who has Scrooge relive his past. While he felt comfort from his sister, Fan, and her best friend, Belle, he was unwanted by his father, James Emanuel, and was sent away to boarding school. As a young adult he became apprentice to Fezziwig, who treated him like a son, and where he became reacquainted with Belle. However, after being left the inheritance by his late father, Scrooge became greedier, whilst Fan was disowned by their father as he did not approve of her marriage and pregnancy and it is implied she was driven to poverty and died shortly after Fred was born. Scrooge finally relives his biggest regret: choosing pursuit of wealth over Belle, which prompted her to leave him.

The next spirit, the Ghost of Christmas Present, shows Scrooge how others keep Christmas, including Fred and the Cratchits. Tiny Tim, who is ailing with pneumonia, concerns Scrooge, but the spirit sarcastically uses Scrooge's previous unkind remarks of the surplus population. The final spirit, the Ghost of Christmas Yet to Come, shows him two future deaths: that of Tiny Tim, who is mourned for by his family, and his own, which sees the people of London overjoyed that he is gone. The ghost of Marley returns him to the present, where Scrooge first dismisses what happened as a bad dream, but after seeing his ghostly chains in a mirror, he resolves to becoming a kinder man.

However, the children's hospital is still closed down and its patients evicted. Belle finally confronts Scrooge, who expresses guilt and sorrow for everything wicked he has done, but Belle reassures him that he can start afresh and use his money to make a difference in peoples' lives. Scrooge fires Old Joe, Dr. Lambert is released from prison, and Scrooge makes Bob his new partner and promises to help his family as well, which sees Tiny Tim recover from his illness.

== Voice cast ==
- Simon Callow as:
  - Charles Dickens (live-action scenes)
  - Ebenezer Scrooge (voice)
- Kate Winslet as Belle (voice)
- Nicolas Cage as Jacob Marley (voice)
- Jane Horrocks as Ghost of Christmas Past (voice)
- Michael Gambon as Ghost of Christmas Present (voice)
- Rhys Ifans as Bob Cratchit (voice)
- Juliet Stevenson as Emily Cratchit (voice)
- Robert Llewellyn as Old Joe (voice)
- Iain Jones as Fred (voice)
- Beth Winslet as Fan (voice)
- Colin McFarlane as Albert Fezziwig (voice)
- Arthur Cox as Dr. Lambert (voice)
- Keith Wickham as
  - Mr. Leach (voice)
  - Undertaker (voice)
- Joss Sanglier as Choir Master (voice)
- Sarah Annison as Mice Voice No. 1 (voice)
- Rosalie MacCraig as Mice Voice No. 2 (voice)

== Production ==
A Christmas Carol was directed by Jimmy Murakami, who helmed the Oscar-nominated The Snowman and When the Wind Blows in the 1980s. The animation was carried out by several companies across Great Britain, the Czech Republic, Poland, Estonia, Spain and South Korea. It is bookended by live-action sequences featuring Simon Callow as Charles Dickens, who reads his tale to a Boston theatre audience. However, in certain DVD releases, the live action scenes are cut. Callow would play Dickens again three years later in 2005 in the Doctor Who episode "The Unquiet Dead".

== Release and reception ==
Christmas Carol was released on 7 December 2001 by Pathé in the UK, although it was originally slated for 30 November. In the United States, Metro-Goldwyn-Mayer released it straight to video on VHS and on Region 1 DVD on 7 October 2003 in full screen. The film was largely panned by critics, holding a rating of 13% on Rotten Tomatoes. After viewing it at the Toronto International Film Festival, Variety's Todd McCarthy wrote: "[The] character animation is dully inexpressive, and two obnoxious mute mice do more scampering and gesticulating than Harpo Marx did in his entire career."

== See also ==
- List of A Christmas Carol adaptations
- List of Christmas films
- List of ghost films
- List of animated feature-length films
