= Golden Hat Foundation =

American autism advocacy organization

The Golden Hat Foundation is a nonprofit organisation founded by actress Kate Winslet and Margret Ericsdottir in 2010. The two met while Winslet was filming the documentary A Mother's Courage: Talking Back to Autism, which focused on Ericsdottir's son Keli Thorsteinsson, who is autistic and non-verbal. The organization centers on raising strengths-focused autism awareness and states that their mission is to "Change the way people on the autism spectrum are perceived, by shining a light on their abilities and emphasizing their great potential."

The organization takes its name from a poem written by Thorsteinsson, in which he described a magical golden hat that had the ability to speak for its protagonist, who was unable to speak. In 2011 the Golden Hat Foundation paired with the cosmetics company Lancôme to create a golden hat themed makeup collection, with the intent for part of the proceeds to benefit the organization.

== Documentary ==
A Mother's Courage: Talking Back to Autism released in 2009 and centered upon Ericsdottir's attempts to find a way for her son Keli to communicate. The documentary was directed by Friðrik Þór Friðriksson and featured Winslet as the film's narrator. A Mother's Courage was met with positive reviews. The documentary introduced Ericsdottir and Winslet to one another, and Winslet came up with the idea of creating the Golden Hat Foundation after her daughter Mia asked Winslet about what it would be like to be unable to communicate with her mother.

== Book ==
On March 27, 2012, Winslet and the Golden Hat Foundation published The Golden Hat: Talking Back to Autism through Simon & Schuster. The book compiled correspondence between Winslet and Ericsdottir, personal statements from various celebrities, and several contributions from Ericsdottir's son Keli. Publishers Weekly gave a positive review for The Golden Hat, praising it for its "warmth and sincerity".
