= The Magic Finger =

1966 children's book by Roald Dahl

- First British edition (Allen & Unwin, 1968)
- Author: Roald Dahl
- Illustrator: William Pène du Bois (first), Pat Marriott, Tony Ross, Quentin Blake
- Cover artist: Pène du Bois (first), Marriott, Ross, Blake
- Subject: Hunting, magic
- Genre: Children's picture book, Fantasy, Comedy
- Publisher: Harper & Row (first), George Allen and Unwin (first UK)
- Publication date: 1966
- Publication place: United States; United Kingdom
- Media type: Print (hardcover)
- Pages: 40
- LC Class: PZ7.D1515 Mag

The Magic Finger is a 1966 children's story by British author Roald Dahl. First published in the United States by Harper & Row with illustrations by William Pène du Bois, Allen & Unwin published the first U.K. edition in 1968. Later editions have been illustrated by Pat Marriott, Tony Ross, and Quentin Blake.

== Synopsis ==
The Magic Finger is narrated by an unnamed eight-year-old girl who is growing up on a remote rural farm in the English countryside, next door to the Gregg family who have a passion for hunting animals and birds. The so-named "magic finger" is an ability the girl has that activates inadvertently whenever she gets angry: the finger itself shoots out a beam of electrical energy that apparently seeks out whoever has angered the girl, with unpredictable consequences. For example, when the girl's teacher, Mrs. Winter, shames her for misspelling the word "cat", the magic finger gives Mrs. Winter whiskers and a bushy tail, and the girl cryptically states that Mrs. Winter was never quite the same again.

One day, the girl sees Mr. Gregg and his two sons, Philip and William, returning home from a hunt with a deer that they have just killed, and they make fun of her and tell her to mind her own business when she shouts at them. In a rage, the girl puts the Magic Finger itself on the entire family; when they wake up the following morning they have shrunk to bird-size and developed "ducks' wings" in place of their arms and hands. While trying out their new wings, the Greggs fly out of their house, which is promptly occupied by four human-sized ducks with human arms and human hands, and they are all soon forced to build a nest in an old tree for the night.

The following morning, the Greggs all find that, in a major reversal of their habits, three out of four of the ducks are holding the Greggs' hunting guns in their hands. Desperately, Mr. and Mrs. Gregg both persuade the ducks not to shoot them, but the mother duck (the only duck who never holds a gun) taunts them about their own fondness for shooting, especially since the previous day, they somehow shot all six of the duck's children. Mr. Gregg tells the duck mother to give up shooting and he destroys all three guns with a big hammer, swearing never to hurt another duck, deer, "or anything else again". The four ducks then head back toward the lake where they live, before letting the Greggs leave their tree. Then, the Greggs all find themselves returned to normal by magic.

The eight-year-old girl comes by the Greggs' farm to see that the Gregg family (now changing their surname to Egg) have fully changed their ways and are now feeding and caring for the birds. As Philip and William tell the girl their entire story, the sound of gunfire in the distance attracts the girl's attention, and she feels her magic finger charging up again.

== Adaptations ==
=== Audio ===
An unabridged recording of the book read by Roald Dahl himself was released as part of a compilation set by Harper Children Audio. A 1980's version released by WM Collins features Anne Clements as narrator. The 2013 edition of the audiobook featured narration by Kate Winslet and was released on digital audio by Penguin Audio.

=== Animation ===
The story was adapted into an original video animation (OVA) by Abbey Broadcast Communications in 1990, which was released straight-to-video through Abbey Home Entertainment. It was a faithful adaption of the original story, which was told through Clements' audiobook recordings against animations in the style of Quentin Blake's illustrations. Re-releases from 1997 onwards redubbed Clements' narration with that of actress Caroline Quentin. For its 2005 DVD release, the original narration was reinstated.
