= What If (Kate Winslet song) =

2001 single by Kate Winslet

Single by Kate Winslet

from the album Christmas Carol: The Movie soundtrack
- B-side: The Coventry Carol (Note: "The Coventry Carol" is performed by The Tiffin Choir.)
- Released: 12 November 2001
- Studio: Air Lyndhurst (London); Rokstone (London)
- Genre: Pop
- Length: 4:05
- Label: EMI; Liberty UK
- Songwriters: Steve Mac; Wayne Hector
- Producer: Steve Mac

"What If" is a song performed by English actress Kate Winslet, recorded for the animated film Christmas Carol: The Movie (2001). Winslet provided the voice of Belle in the feature, which is based on the Charles Dickens classic 1843 novel and also stars Nicolas Cage, Jane Horrocks and Simon Callow. "What If" was written by Wayne Hector and Steve Mac, while production was helmed by the latter. The song is a ballad that follows the film's theme, as Belle laments the end of her and Scrooge's relationship and wonders what could have been. It was the only song to be released from the official movie soundtrack.

"What If" was released as a single in Germany on 12 November 2001 and was issued in the United Kingdom two weeks later. News that Winslet was secretly recording the one-off single to vie for the 2001 UK Christmas number one spot was reported in the Daily Mirror. In the event, the song entered the UK Singles Chart at number six, its peak. Elsewhere, "What If" became a number-one hit in Austria, Flanders, and Ireland whilst also reaching the top 10 in Germany, the Netherlands, and Switzerland. Critically acclaimed, the song won the 2002 OGAE Song Contest. At Winslet's request, the proceeds from the single were given to the National Society for the Prevention of Cruelty to Children and Sargent Cancer Care for Children.

== Critical reception ==
Can't Stop the Pop described "What If" as a "ballad of epic proportions", and a "huge, soaring Disney-esque ballad". Barbara Ellen from The Observer said it is "a sweet, trilling, sub-Celine little ditty." British trade paper Music Week noted that "Winslet's new romance [following a divorce] might make the lyrics ... less poignant" but deemed it "a good song [sung] well".

== Music video ==
An accompanying music video, which was directed by Paul Donnellon and produced by Chris Horton, shows Winslet walking around an old Victorian house, haunted by the ghost of a girl, along with clips from the film.

== Track listings ==
UK CD single

1. "What If"
2. "The Coventry Carol"
3. "What If" (film version)
4. "What If" (enhanced video)

UK cassette single

1. "What If"
2. "The Coventry Carol"
3. "What If" (film version)

European CD single

1. "What If" (full version)
2. "What If" (film version)

== Credits and personnel ==
Credits are adapted from the UK CD single liner notes.

Studios

- Recorded at Air Lyndhurst and Rokstone Studios (London, England)

Personnel

- Kate Winslet – vocals
- Steve Mac – writing, production
- Wayne Hector – writing
- Chris Laws – engineering
- Matt Howe – engineering
- Daniel Pursey – engineering assistant
- Jason Bell – cover photography
- The Red Room – cover design
- Graeme Perkins – music supervisor for Christmas Carol: The Movie soundtrack

== Charts ==
=== Weekly charts ===
Chart (2001–2002)	Peak position
Austria (Ö3 Austria Top 40)	1
Belgium (Ultratop 50 Flanders)	1
Croatia (HRT)	6
Europe (Eurochart Hot 100)	8
Germany (GfK)	6
Ireland (IRMA)	1
Netherlands (Dutch Top 40)	3
Netherlands (Single Top 100)	3
Romania (Romanian Top 100)	69
Scotland Singles (Official Charts)	5
Switzerland (Schweizer Hitparade)	4
UK Singles (Official Charts)	6
UK Airplay (Music Week)	35

=== Year-end charts ===
Chart (2001)	Position
Ireland (IRMA)	12
UK Singles (OCC)	94

Chart (2002)	Position
Austria (Ö3 Austria Top 40)	17
Belgium (Ultratop 50 Flanders)	23
Europe (Eurochart Hot 100)	29
Germany (Media Control)	35
Ireland (IRMA)	39
Netherlands (Dutch Top 40)	29
Netherlands (Single Top 100)	23
Switzerland (Schweizer Hitparade)	25
UK Singles (OCC)	152

== Certifications ==
Region	Certification	Certified units/sales
Belgium (BRMA)	Gold	25,000^{*}
Germany (BVMI)	Gold	250,000^{^}
Switzerland (IFPI Switzerland)	Gold	20,000^{^}
United Kingdom (BPI)	Silver	200,000^{^}
^{*} Sales figures based on certification alone.^{^} Shipments figures based on certification alone.

== Release history ==
Region	Date	Format(s)	Label(s)	Ref.
Germany	12 November 2001	CD	EMI	
United Kingdom	26 November 2001	CD; cassette	Liberty UK	

== Cover versions ==
- In 2004, a dance remake of the song was released by Dutch producer Ronald Vos (under the moniker of Ronny V), with Nanda Philipse (from the Dutch gothic metal band Infinite Dawn) providing the vocals.
- In 2008, the 2007 X-Factor finalist Rhydian Roberts included a duet of the song with American singer and Broadway actress Idina Menzel on his debut album Rhydian.
- Britain's Got Talent 2010 semi-finalist Olivia Archbold performed this song. She came in third place in the semi-finals and lost the judges' votes to Tobias Mead. Due to the performance, "What If" re-entered the UK Singles Charts at number 76 on 6 June 2010.
