= Kate Winslet =

English actress (born 1975)

Kate Winslet CBE
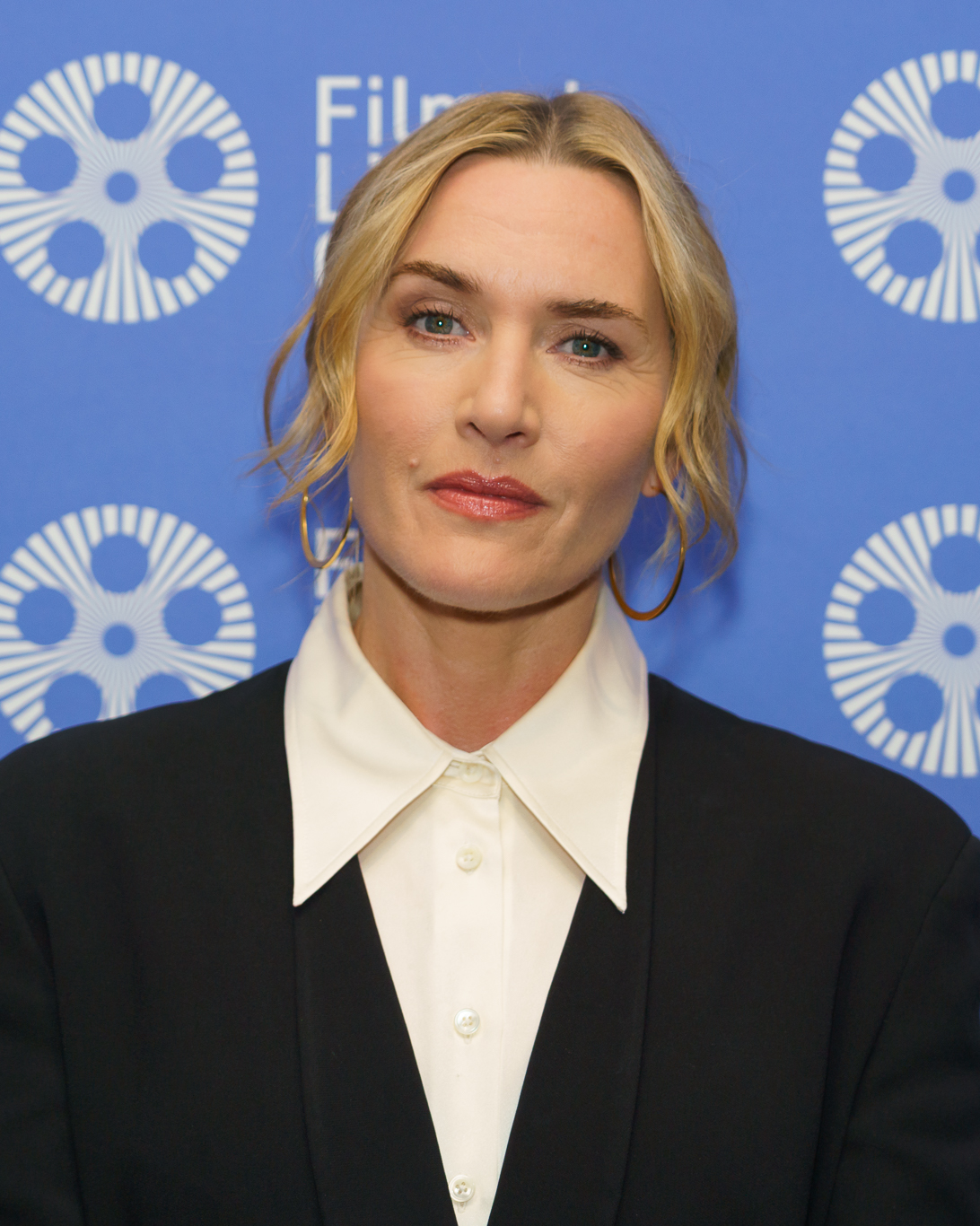
- Winslet in 2025
- Born: Kate Elizabeth Winslet; 5 October 1975 (age 51); Reading, Berkshire, England
- Occupation: Actress
- Years active: 1991–present
- Organisation: Golden Hat Foundation
- Works: Full list
- Spouses: Jim Threapleton (m. 1998; div. 2001); Sam Mendes (m. 2003; div. 2011); Edward Abel Smith (Note: Abel Smith was legally known as Ned Rocknroll from 2008 to 2019.) (m. 2012)
- Children: 3, including Mia Threapleton and Joe Anders
- Relatives: Richard Branson (uncle-in-law)
- Awards: Full list

Signature
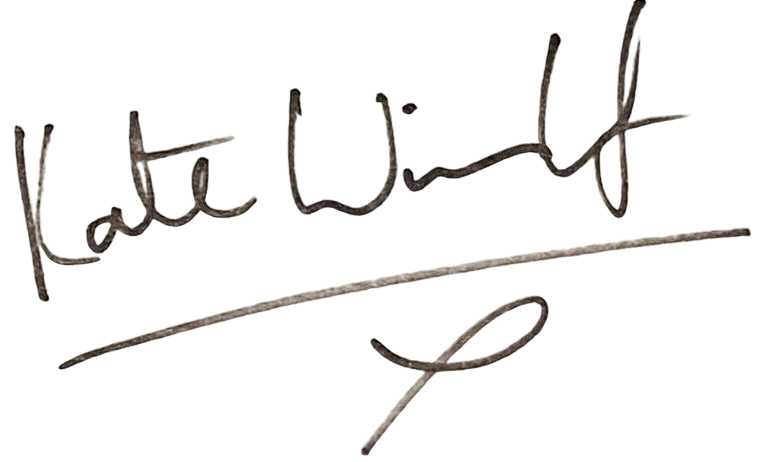

Kate Elizabeth Winslet (/ˈwɪnzlət/; born 5 October 1975) is an English actress. Primarily known for her roles as headstrong women in independent films, particularly period dramas, she has received numerous accolades, including an Academy Award, two Primetime Emmy Awards, five BAFTA Awards and five Golden Globe Awards. Time magazine named Winslet one of the 100 most influential people in the world in 2009 and 2021. She was appointed Commander of the Order of the British Empire (CBE) in 2012.

Winslet studied drama at the Redroofs Theatre School. Her first screen appearance, at age fifteen, was in the British television series Dark Season (1991). She made her film debut playing a teenage murderess in Heavenly Creatures (1994), and went on to win a BAFTA Award for playing Marianne Dashwood in Sense and Sensibility (1995). Global stardom followed with her leading role in James Cameron's epic romance Titanic (1997), which was the highest-grossing film at the time. Winslet then eschewed parts in blockbusters in favour of critically acclaimed period pieces, including Quills (2000) and Iris (2001).

The science fiction romance Eternal Sunshine of the Spotless Mind (2004), in which Winslet was cast against type in a contemporary setting, proved to be a turning point in her career, and she gained further recognition for her performances in Finding Neverland (2004), Little Children (2006), The Holiday (2006), Revolutionary Road (2008), and The Reader (2008). For playing a former Nazi camp guard in the last, she won the BAFTA Award and the Academy Award for Best Actress. Winslet has since portrayed historical figures in Steve Jobs (2015) and Lee (2023) and received two Primetime Emmy Awards for her performances in the HBO miniseries Mildred Pierce (2011) and Mare of Easttown (2021).

For her narration of a short story in the audiobook Listen to the Storyteller (1999), Winslet won a Grammy Award. She performed the song "What If" for the soundtrack of her film, Christmas Carol: The Movie (2001). A co-founder of the charity Golden Hat Foundation, which aims to create autism awareness, Winslet has also written a book on the topic. Divorced from film directors Jim Threapleton and Sam Mendes, Winslet has been married to businessman Edward Abel Smith since 2012. She has a child from each marriage, two of whom are the actors Mia Threapleton and Joe Anders.

== Early life and education ==
Kate Elizabeth Winslet was born on 5 October 1975 in Reading, Berkshire, to Sally Ann (née Bridges) and Roger John Winslet. Her mother worked as a nanny and waitress, while her father, a struggling actor, took labouring jobs to support the family. Her maternal grandparents were both actors and ran the Reading Repertory Theatre Company. Winslet has two sisters, Anna and Beth, both of whom are actresses, and a younger brother, Joss. The siblings are of British, Irish, and Swedish descent. The family had limited financial means; they lived on free meal benefits and were supported by a charity, the Actors' Charitable Trust. When Winslet was ten, her father severely injured his foot in a boating accident and found it harder to work, leading to more financial hardships for the family. Winslet has said her parents always made them feel cared for and that they were a supportive family.

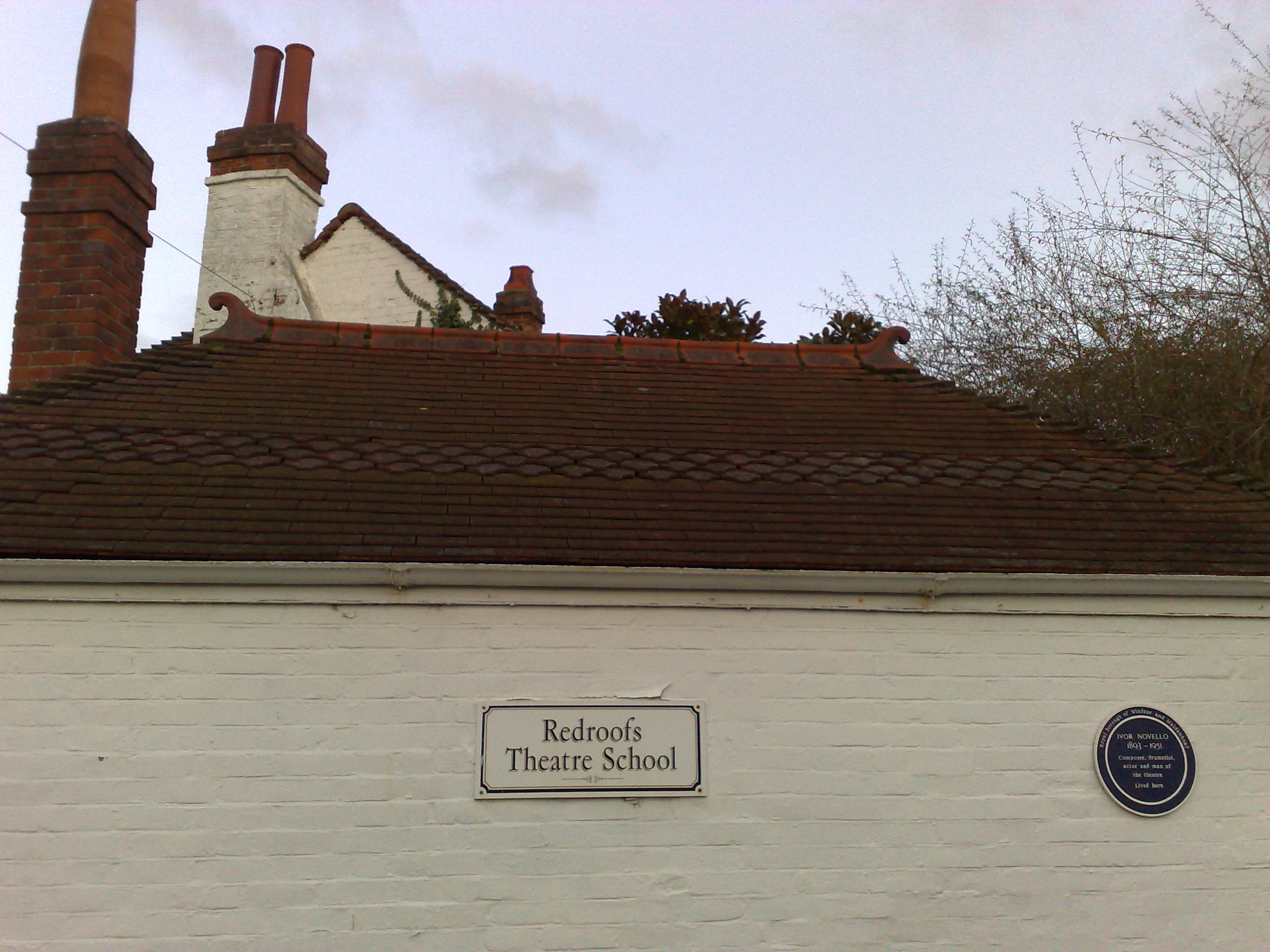
The Redroofs Theatre School in Maidenhead, where Winslet was educated

Winslet attended St Mary and All Saints' Church of England primary school. Living in a family of actors inspired her to pursue acting from a young age. She and her sisters participated in amateur stage shows at school and at a local youth theatre, named Foundations. When she was five, Winslet made her first stage appearance as Mary, mother of Jesus in her school's production of the nativity play. She describes herself as an overweight child who was called "blubber" by her schoolmates and bullied for her appearance. She said she did not let this stop her.

At eleven, Winslet enrolled at Redroofs Theatre School, a private school in Maidenhead. The school also functioned as an agency and took students to London to audition for acting jobs. She appeared in a Sugar Puffs commercial and dubbed for foreign films. At school, she was made head girl, took part in productions of Alice's Adventures in Wonderland and The Lion, the Witch and the Wardrobe, and played the lead role of Wendy Darling in Peter Pan. She worked simultaneously with the Starmaker Theatre Company in Reading. She participated in over twenty of their stage productions, but was rarely selected as the lead due to her weight. Nonetheless, she played key roles as Miss Agatha Hannigan in Annie, the Mother Wolf in The Jungle Book, and Lena Marelli in Bugsy Malone.

In 1991, within two weeks of finishing her GCSE examinations, Winslet made her screen debut as one of the main cast members of the BBC science fiction television series Dark Season, written by Russell T Davies. Her part was that of Reet, a schoolgirl who helps her classmates fight against a sinister man distributing free computers to her school. She did not earn much from the job and, at age sixteen, lack of funds forced Winslet to leave Redroofs. To support herself, she worked at a delicatessen.

== Career ==
=== Early work and breakthrough (1992–1996) ===
In 1992, she had a small part in the television film Anglo-Saxon Attitudes, an adaptation of Angus Wilson's satirical novel. Winslet, who weighed 13 stone 3 pounds (84 kg; 185 lb) at the time, played the daughter of an obese woman. During filming, after hearing an off-hand comment from the director Diarmuid Lawrence about the likeness between her and the actress who played her mother, Winslet became motivated to lose weight. She next took on the role of the young daughter of a bankrupt self-made man (played by Ray Winstone) in the television sitcom Get Back (1992–1993). She also had a guest role in a 1993 episode of the medical drama series Casualty.

Winslet was among 175 women to audition for Peter Jackson's psychological drama Heavenly Creatures (1994), and was cast after impressing Jackson with the intensity she brought to her part. The New Zealand-based production is based on the Parker–Hulme murder case of 1954, in which Winslet played Juliet Hulme, a teenager who assists her friend, Pauline Parker (played by Melanie Lynskey), in the murder of Pauline's mother. She prepared for the part by reading the transcripts of the girls' murder trial, their letters and diaries, and interacted with their acquaintances. She has said she learnt tremendously from the job. Jackson filmed in the real murder locations, and the experience left Winslet traumatised. She found it difficult to detach herself from her character, and said that after returning home, she often cried. The film was a critical breakthrough for Winslet; Desson Thomson, a reviewer for The Washington Post, called her "a bright-eyed ball of fire, lighting up every scene she's in". Winslet recorded "Juliet's Aria" for the film's soundtrack. Also that year, she appeared as Geraldine Barclay, a prospective secretary, in the Royal Exchange Theatre production of Joe Orton's farce What the Butler Saw.

While promoting Heavenly Creatures in Los Angeles, Winslet auditioned for the minor part of Lucy Steele for a 1995 film adaptation of Jane Austen's novel Sense and Sensibility, written by and starring Emma Thompson. Impressed by her reading, Thompson cast her in the much larger part of the recklessly romantic teenager Marianne Dashwood. The director Ang Lee wanted Winslet to play the part with grace and restraint—aspects that he felt were missing from her performance in Heavenly Creatures—and thus asked her to practise tai chi, read gothic literature, and learn to play the piano. David Parkinson of Radio Times considered Winslet to be a standout among the cast, and Mick LaSalle of the San Francisco Chronicle took note of how well she portrayed her character's growth and maturity. The film grossed over $134 million worldwide. She won the Screen Actors Guild and British Academy Film Award for Best Supporting Actress, and received an Academy Award nomination in the same category. Also in 1995, Winslet featured in the poorly received Disney film A Kid in King Arthur's Court.

Winslet had roles in two period dramas of 1996—Jude and Hamlet. As with Heavenly Creatures, her roles in these films were those of women with a "mad edge". In Michael Winterbottom's Jude, based on the novel Jude the Obscure by Thomas Hardy, she played Sue Bridehead, a young woman with suffragette leanings who falls in love with her cousin, Jude (played by Christopher Eccleston). The critic Roger Ebert believed the part allowed Winslet to display her acting range, and praised her for the defiance she brought to the role. After unsuccessfully auditioning for Kenneth Branagh's 1994 film Mary Shelley's Frankenstein, she was cast in the part of Ophelia, the doomed lover of the title character, in Branagh's adaptation of the William Shakespeare tragedy Hamlet. Twenty-year-old Winslet was intimidated by the experience of performing Shakespeare with established actors such as Branagh and Julie Christie, saying the job required a level of intellect that she thought she did not possess. Mike Jeffries of Empire believed that she had played the part "well beyond her years". Despite the acclaim, Jude and Hamlet earned little at the box office.

=== Worldwide recognition and independent films (1997–2003) ===
Winslet was keen on playing Rose DeWitt Bukater, a socialite aboard the ill-fated RMS Titanic, in James Cameron's epic romance Titanic (1997). Cameron was initially reluctant to cast her, preferring the likes of Claire Danes and Gwyneth Paltrow, but she pleaded with him, "You don't understand! I am Rose! I don't know why you're even seeing anyone else!" Her persistence led him to give her the part. Leonardo DiCaprio featured as her love interest, Jack. Titanic had a production budget of $200 million, and its arduous principal photography was held at Baja Studios where a replica of the ship was created. Filming proved taxing for Winslet; she almost drowned, caught influenza, experienced hypothermia, and had bruises on her arms and knees. The workload allowed her only four hours of sleep per day and she felt drained by the experience. Writing for Newsweek, David Ansen commended Winslet for capturing her character's zeal with delicacy, and Mike Clark of USA Today considered her to be the film's prime asset. Against expectations, Titanic went on to become the highest-grossing film to that point, earning over $2 billion in box office receipts worldwide, and established Winslet as a global star. The film won eleven Academy Awards—tied for most for a single film—including Best Picture, and earned the 22-year-old Winslet a nomination for Best Actress. She also received Golden Globe and SAG nominations for Best Actress.

Winslet did not view Titanic as a platform for larger salaries. She avoided parts in blockbuster films in favour of independent productions that were not widely seen, believing that she "still had a lot to learn" and was unprepared to be a star. She later said her decision ensured career longevity. Hideous Kinky, a low-budget drama shot before the release of Titanic, was Winslet's sole film release of 1998. She turned down offers to star in Shakespeare in Love (1998) and Anna and the King (1999) to do the film. Based on the semi-autobiographical novel by Esther Freud, Hideous Kinky tells the story of a single British mother yearning for a new life in 1970s Morocco. Janet Maslin of The New York Times credited Winslet for her decision to follow-up Titanic with such an offbeat project and highlighted how well she captured her character's "obliviousness and optimism".

Jane Campion's psychological drama Holy Smoke! (1999) featured Winslet as an Australian woman who joins an Indian religious cult. She found the script brave and was challenged by the idea of playing an unlikeable, manipulative woman. She learnt to speak with an Australian accent and worked closely with Campion to justify her character's vileness. The film required her to perform explicit sex scenes with co-star Harvey Keitel, and featured a scene in which her character appears naked and urinates on herself. David Rooney of Variety wrote, "Showing the kind of courage few young thesps would be capable of and an extraordinary range ... from animal cunning to unhinged desperation, [Winslet] holds nothing back." That same year, she voiced a fairy for the animated film Faeries, and won the Grammy Award for Best Spoken Word Album for Children for narrating the short story "The Face in the Lake" for the children's audiobook Listen to the Storyteller.

In Quills (2000), a biopic of the erratic Marquis de Sade, starring Geoffrey Rush and Joaquin Phoenix, Winslet played the supporting role of a sexually repressed laundress working in a mental asylum. Hailing her as the "most daring actress working today", James Greenberg of Los Angeles magazine praised Winslet for "continuing to explore the bounds of sexual liberation". She received a SAG Award nomination for Best Supporting Actress. The following year, she played a fictitious mathematician involved in the cracking of the Enigma ciphers in Michael Apted's espionage thriller Enigma. Winslet's character was vastly expanded from a subsidiary love-interest in the novel it was based on to a prominent code-breaker in the film. She was pregnant while filming, and to prevent this from showing, she wore corsets under her costume.

The biopic Iris (2001) featured Winslet and Judi Dench as the novelist Iris Murdoch at different ages. The director Richard Eyre cast the two actresses after finding a "correspondence of spirit between them". Winslet was drawn to the idea of playing an intellectual and zesty female lead, and in research, she read Murdoch's novels, studied her husband's memoir Elegy for Iris, and watched televised interviews of Murdoch. The project was filmed over four weeks and allowed Winslet to bring her daughter, who was six months old at the time, on set. Writing for The Guardian, Martin Amis remarked that "the seriousness and steadiness of [Winslet's] gaze effectively suggest the dawning amplitude of the Murdoch imagination". She received her third Oscar nomination for Iris, in addition to BAFTA and Golden Globe nominations for Best Supporting Actress.

Winslet's third film release of 2001 was the animated film Christmas Carol: The Movie, based on Charles Dickens' novel. For the film's soundtrack she recorded "What If", which proved to be a commercial hit. After a year-long absence from the screen, Winslet starred as a headstrong journalist interviewing a professor on death row in the thriller The Life of David Gale (2003). She agreed to the project to work with the director Alan Parker, whom she admired, and believed the film raised pertinent questions about capital punishment. Mick LaSalle thought the film had muddled the subject and disliked both the film and Winslet's performance.

=== Career progression (2004–2007) ===
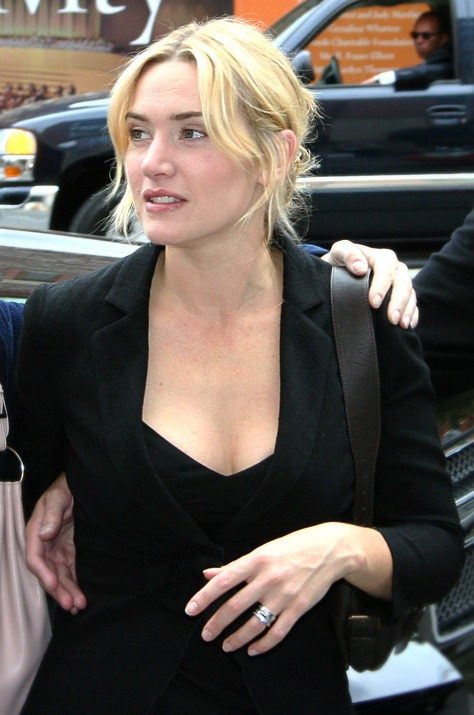
Winslet at the 2006 Toronto International Film Festival

To avoid typecasting in historical dramas, Winslet actively looked for roles in contemporary-set films. She found it in the science fiction romance Eternal Sunshine of the Spotless Mind (2004), in which she played a neurotic and impetuous woman who decides to erase memories of her ex-boyfriend (played by Jim Carrey). Unlike her previous assignments, the role allowed her to display the quirky side to her personality. Gondry encouraged Winslet and Carrey to improvise on set, and to keep herself agile she practised kickboxing. Eternal Sunshine of the Spotless Mind proved to be a modest financial success and several critics have regarded it as one of the best films of the 21st century. Peter Travers of Rolling Stone described it as a "uniquely funny, unpredictably tender and unapologetically twisted romance" and found Winslet to be "electrifying and bruisingly vulnerable" in it. A journalist for Premiere magazine commended her for abandoning her "corseted English rose persona", and ranked it as the 81st greatest film performance of all time. Winslet considers it to be a favourite among her roles, and she received Best Actress nominations at the Oscar and BAFTA award ceremonies. She has said the film marked a turning point in her career and prompted directors to offer her a wide variety of parts.

Her next release of the year was the drama Finding Neverland, about the relationship between J. M. Barrie (played by Johnny Depp) and the Llewelyn Davies boys, which inspired Barrie to write Peter Pan. Winslet was paid £6 million to play the boys' mother, Sylvia, and despite her reluctance to star in another period piece, she agreed to the project after empathising with Sylvia's love for her children. Ella Taylor of LA Weekly found her to be "radiant and earthy as ever", and CNN's Paul Clinton thought she was "exceptional in a delicate and finely tuned performance". She received a second Best Actress nomination at that year's BAFTA Award ceremony. With a box office gross of $116 million, Finding Neverland became her most widely seen film since Titanic.

In 2005, Winslet took on a guest role in an episode of the British comedy sitcom Extras, starring Ricky Gervais and Stephen Merchant. She played a satirical version of herself in it—an actress, who in an effort to win an Oscar, takes the role of a nun in a Holocaust film. She received a Primetime Emmy Award for Outstanding Guest Actress in a Comedy Series nomination. Within three months of giving birth to her second child, Winslet returned to work on Romance & Cigarettes, a musical romantic comedy directed by John Turturro, in which she played Tula, a promiscuous and foul-mouthed woman. The part required her to sing and dance, and it helped her lose weight gained during the pregnancy. She twisted her ankle while filming one of the dance sequences. Derek Elley of Variety wrote that despite her limited screen time, Winslet had "the showiest role and filthiest one-liners". She turned down an offer from Woody Allen to star in Match Point (2005) to spend more time with her children.

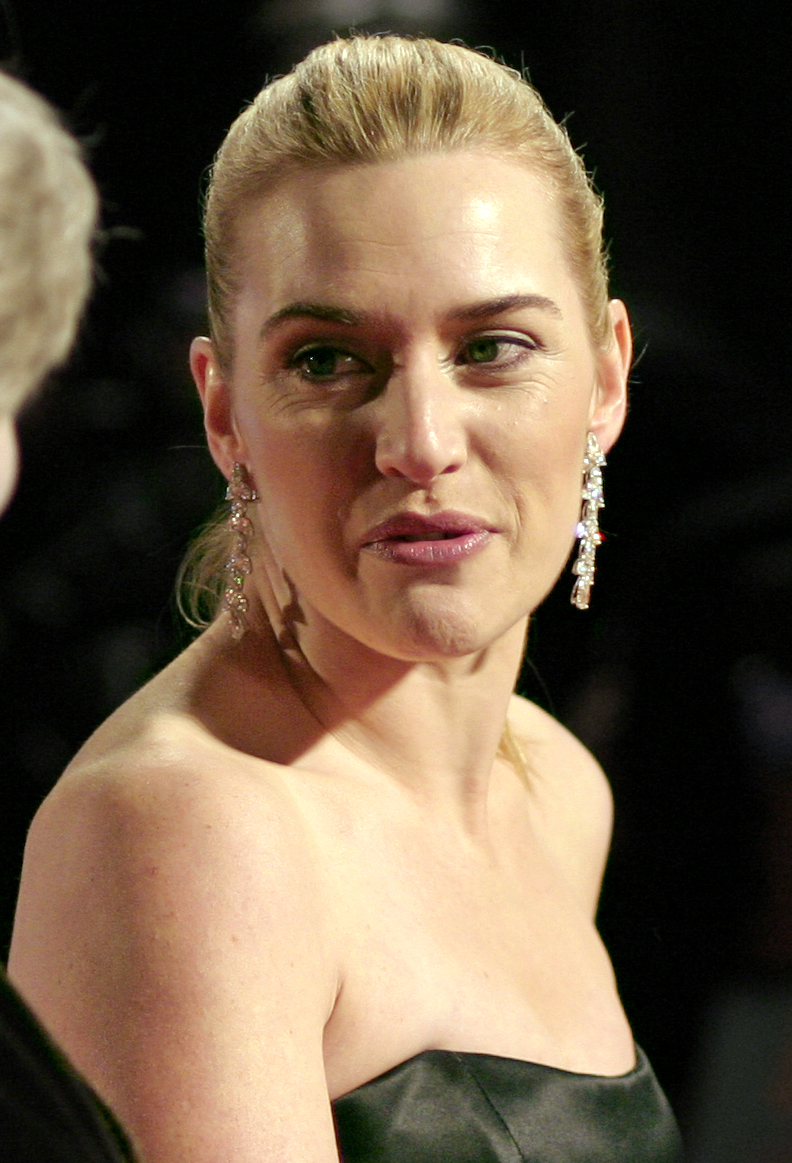
Winslet at the 60th British Academy Film Awards in 2007, where she received her fifth BAFTA Award nomination

Winslet had four film releases in 2006. She first appeared in All the King's Men, a political thriller set in 1940s Louisiana, featuring Sean Penn and Jude Law. She played the supporting part of the love interest to Law's character. The film received negative reviews for its lack of political insight and narrative cohesiveness, and failed to recoup its $55 million investment. Her next release, the Todd Field drama Little Children, was better received. Based on the novel of the same name, the film tells the story of Sarah Pierce, an unhappy housewife who has an affair with a married neighbour (played by Patrick Wilson). Winslet was challenged by the role of an uncaring mother, as she did neither understand nor respect her character's actions. Scenes requiring her to be hostile towards the child actress playing her daughter proved upsetting for her. Having borne two children, she was nervous about the sex scenes in which she had to be nude; she took on the challenge to present a positive image for women with, in her words, "imperfect bodies". A. O. Scott of The New York Times wrote that Winslet successfully "registers every flicker of Sarah's pride, self-doubt and desire, inspiring a mixture of recognition, pity and concern". Once again, she received BAFTA and Academy Award nominations for Best Actress; the latter making her, at 31, the youngest performer to accrue five Oscar nominations.

After Little Children, Winslet took on a part she found more sympathetic in Nancy Meyers's romantic comedy The Holiday. She played a Briton who temporarily exchanges homes with an American (played by Cameron Diaz) during the Christmas holiday season. It became her biggest commercial success in nine years, grossing over $205 million worldwide. The critic Justin Chang found the film formulaic yet pleasing, and took note of Winslet's radiance and charm. In her final release of the year, she voiced Rita, a scavenging sewer rat, in the animated film Flushed Away. Her sole project of 2007 was as the narrator for the English version of the French children's film The Fox and the Child.

=== Awards success (2008–2011) ===
Winslet had two critically acclaimed roles in 2008. After reading Justin Haythe's script for Revolutionary Road, an adaptation of Richard Yates's debut novel, Winslet recommended the project to her then-husband, director Sam Mendes, and her Titanic co-star Leonardo DiCaprio. The film traces the tribulations of a young married couple in 1950s suburban America. Winslet was drawn to the idea of playing a woman whose aspirations had not been met, and she read The Feminine Mystique to understand the psychology of unhappy housewives from the era. Mendes encouraged Winslet and DiCaprio to spend time together, and she believed the small set they used helped them to develop their characters' strained relationship. Hailing her as "the best English-speaking film actress of her generation", David Edelstein of New York magazine wrote that "[t]here isn't a banal moment in Winslet's performance—not a gesture, not a word."

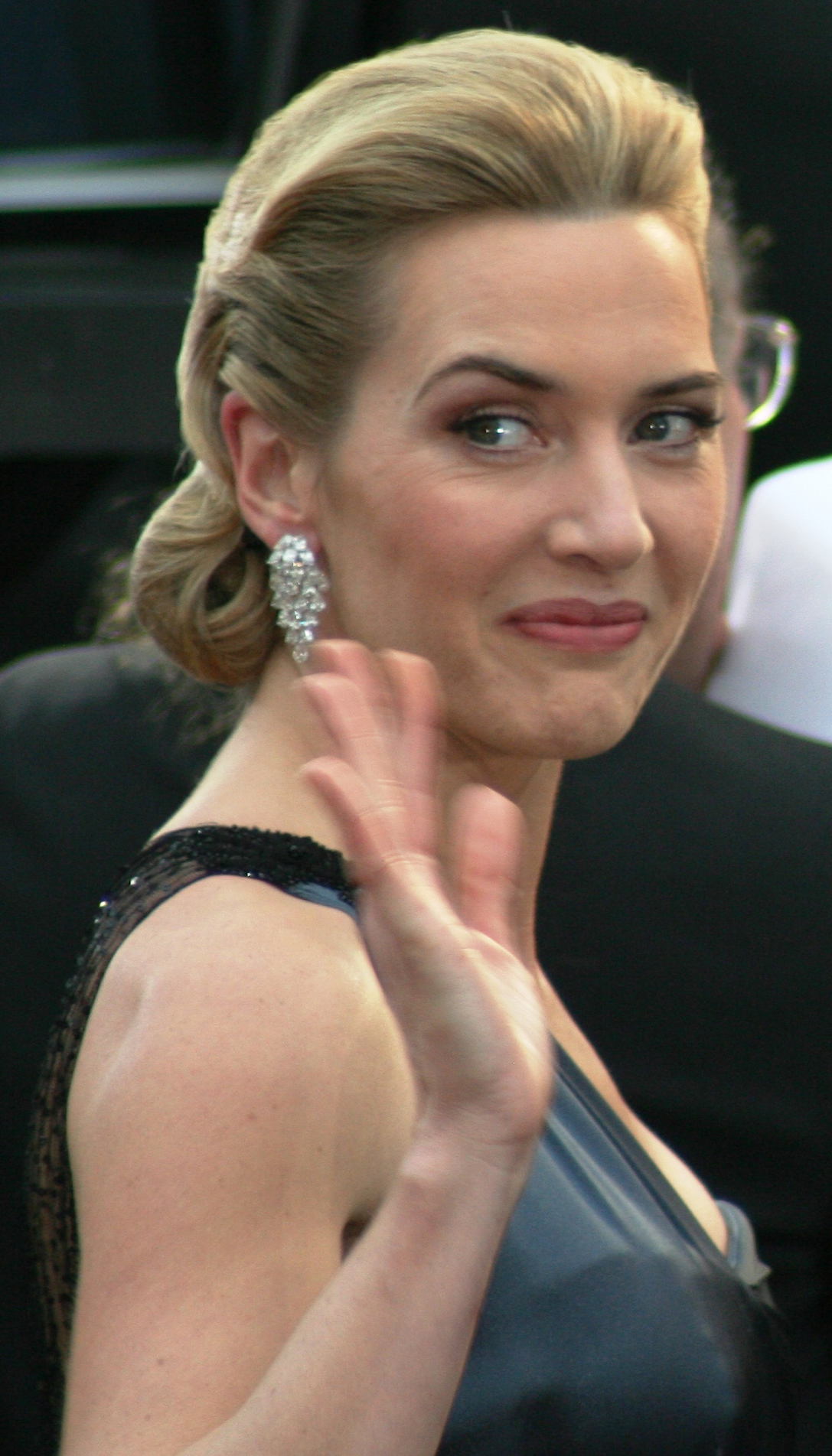
Winslet at the 81st Academy Awards in 2009, where she won the Academy Award for Best Actress

To avoid a scheduling conflict with Revolutionary Road, Winslet turned down an offer to star in The Reader. After her replacement Nicole Kidman left the project due to her pregnancy, Winslet was signed to it. Directed by Stephen Daldry, The Reader is based on Bernhard Schlink's novel Der Vorleser and is about Hanna Schmitz, an illiterate Nazi concentration camp guard (Winslet), who has an affair with a teenage boy. Winslet researched the Holocaust and the SS guards. To educate herself on the stigma of illiteracy, she spent time with students at the Literacy Partners, an organisation that teaches adults to read and write. She was unable to sympathise with Schmitz and struggled to play the part honestly without humanising the character's actions. Despite this, some historians criticised the film for making Schmitz an object of the audience's sympathy and accused the filmmakers of Holocaust revisionism. Writing for Variety, Todd McCarthy commended Winslet for "suppl[ying] a haunting shell to this internally decimated woman," and Sukhdev Sandhu of The Daily Telegraph considered her to be "absolutely fearless here, not just in her willingness to expose herself physically, but her refusal to expose her character psychologically."

Winslet received significant awards attention for her performances in Revolutionary Road and The Reader. She won a Golden Globe Award for each of these films, and for the latter, she was awarded the Academy Award and BAFTA Award for Best Actress. At age 33, she surpassed her own record as the youngest performer to accrue six Oscar nominations. She also became the third actress in history to win two Golden Globe Awards at the same ceremony. Exhausted by the media attention during this period, Winslet took two years off work until she was ready to creatively engage again.

Winslet returned to acting with the five-part HBO series Mildred Pierce (2011), an adaptation of James M. Cain's novel from the director Todd Haynes. It is about the titular heroine (Winslet), a divorcée during the Great Depression struggling to establish a restaurant business while yearning for the respect of her narcissistic daughter (played by Evan Rachel Wood). Winslet, who had recently divorced Mendes, believed certain aspects of her character's life mirrored her own. She was intimidated by the scope of the production, as she featured in every scene of the 280-page script. She was disturbed and upset by the story, and was particularly fascinated by the complex relationship between the mother-daughter pair. She collaborated closely with the production and costume designers, and learnt to bake pies and prepare chickens. The broadcast received a limited audience but gained positive reviews. Matt Zoller Seitz of Salon called the series a "quiet, heartbreaking masterpiece" and described Winslet's performance as "terrific—intelligent, focused and seemingly devoid of ego". She won the Primetime Emmy Award, Golden Globe and SAG Award for Best Actress in a miniseries.

The ensemble thriller Contagion from Steven Soderbergh was Winslet's first film release of 2011. She was cast as a disease detective for the CDC, and she modelled her role on Anne Schuchat, the director of the NCIRD. Contagion was a commercial success, and David Denby of The New Yorker credited Winslet for capturing the essence of an exasperated woman. Her next project was the Roman Polanski-directed Carnage, adapted from the play God of Carnage by Yasmina Reza. Set entirely inside an apartment, the black comedy follows two sets of parents feuding over their respective children. Jodie Foster, John C. Reilly, and Christoph Waltz co-starred. The cast rehearsed the script like a play for two weeks, and Winslet brought her children with her to Paris for the eight weeks of filming. Critics found the adaptation to be less compelling than the play, but praised the performances of Winslet and Foster. They both received Golden Globe nominations for it.

=== Career fluctuations (2012–2019) ===
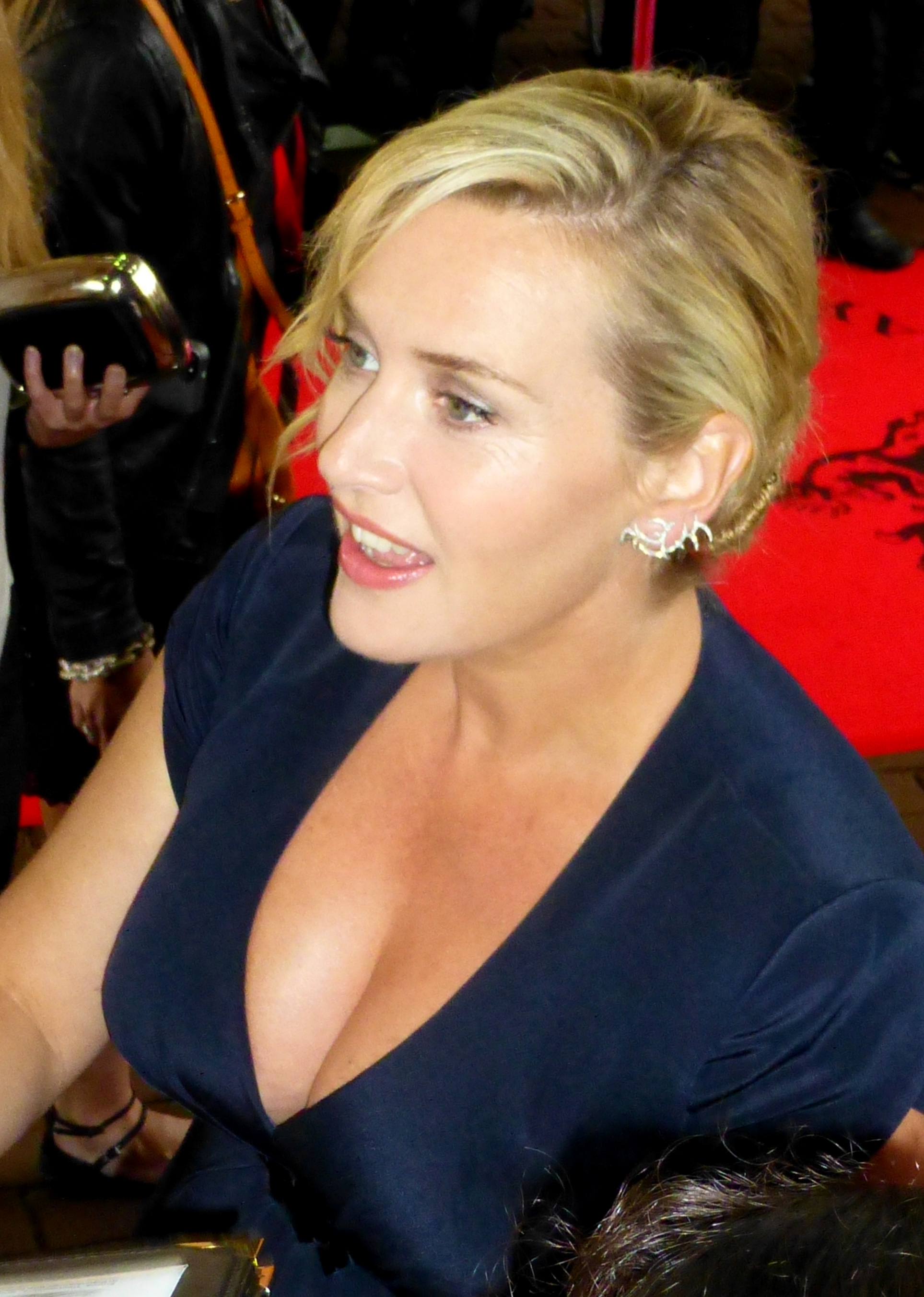
Winslet attending the premiere of Labor Day at the 2013 Toronto International Film Festival

Winslet said her workload in 2011 helped her overcome heartbreak from her divorce, and after completing work on Carnage she took a break from acting to focus on her children. A short part that she had filmed four years prior for the anthology film Movie 43 was her sole screen appearance of 2012, and it received the worst reviews of her career. Winslet also performed an audiobook recording of Émile Zola's novel Thérèse Raquin. She was reluctant to accept Jason Reitman's offer to star in his 2013 film adaptation of Joyce Maynard's novel Labor Day, but agreed after Reitman postponed the production for a year to accommodate Winslet's commitment to her children. Set over a Labor Day weekend, it tells the story of Adele (Winslet), an agoraphobic single mother who falls in love with an escaped convict. Describing Adele's characterisation as having "more vulnerability than strength", Winslet found her a departure from the strong-willed women she typically played. A scene in the film required her to make a pie, for which she drew on her baking experience from Mildred Pierce. Reviews of the film were negative; Chris Nashawaty of Entertainment Weekly dismissed it as "mawkish and melodramatic" but credited Winslet for adding layers to her passive role. She received her tenth Golden Globe nomination.

The novelty of playing a villain drew Winslet to the part of Jeanine Matthews in the science fiction film Divergent (2014). Set in a dystopian future, the adaptation of Veronica Roth's young adult novel stars Shailene Woodley as a heroine fighting an oppressive regime headed by Winslet's character. She was pregnant with her third child during production, and her tight-fitting costumes had to be altered to accommodate the pregnancy. To maintain her character's intimidating persona, she remained aloof from her co-stars for much of the filming. Richard Lawson of Vanity Fair compared the film unfavourably to the Hunger Games series, and found Winslet to be underutilised in it. The film grossed $288 million worldwide. A Little Chaos marked her return to the period film genre. Directed by Alan Rickman, it is about a rivalry among gardeners commissioned to create a fountain at the Palace of Versailles. Winslet's role was that of fictional architect Sabine de Barra, a character she believed had overcome extreme grief and hardship like herself. Catherine Shoard of The Guardian took note of the "emotional honesty" Winslet brought to her part, but criticised the implausibility of her role. Also that year, she read audiobooks of Roald Dahl's children's novels Matilda and The Magic Finger.

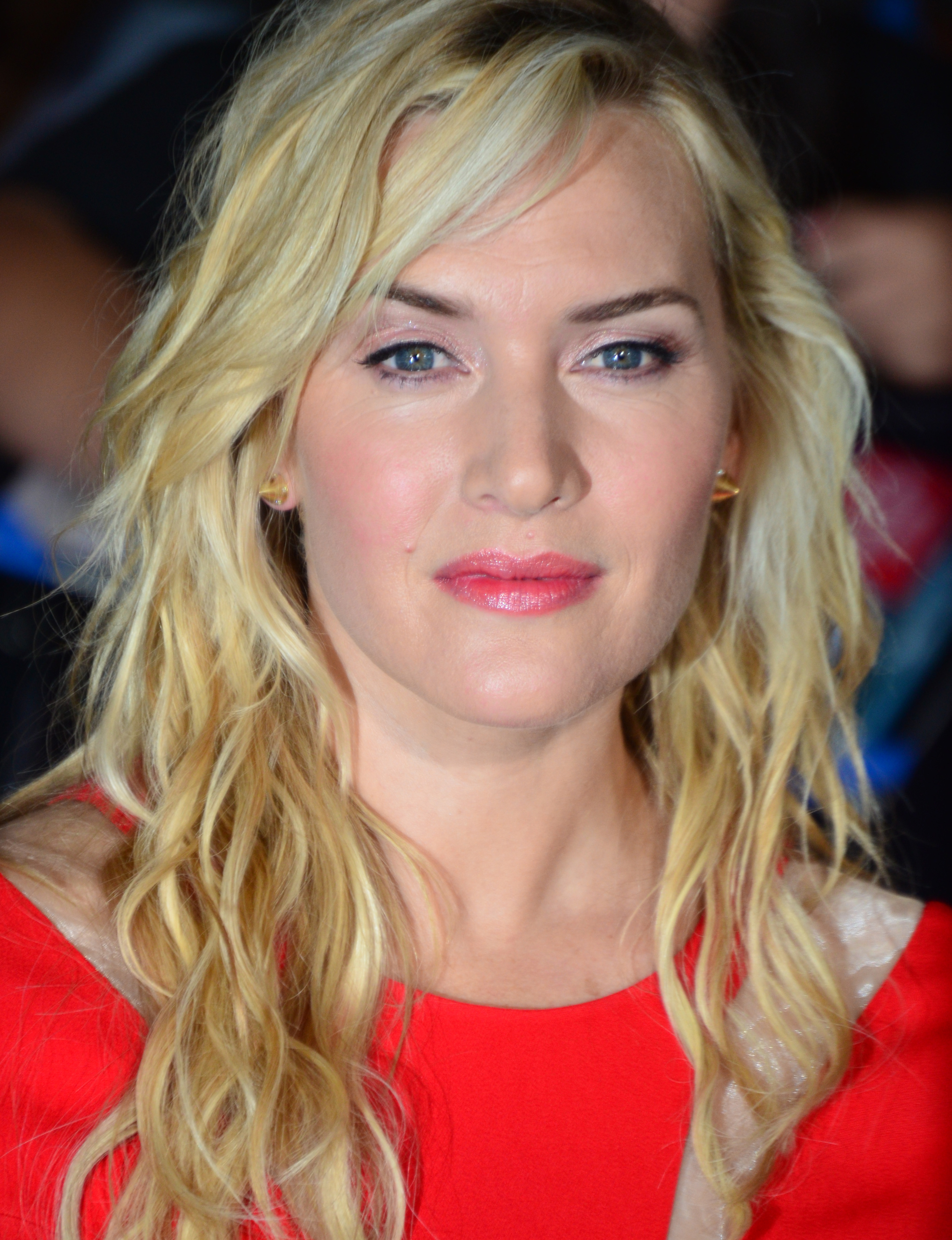
Winslet at the premiere of Divergent in 2014

In 2015, Winslet reprised the role of Jeanine Matthews in the second instalment of the Divergent series, subtitled Insurgent, which despite negative reviews grossed $297 million worldwide. Her next film, an adaptation of the Australian gothic novel The Dressmaker, was described by the director Jocelyn Moorhouse as being reminiscent of the western Unforgiven (1992). Winslet starred as the femme fatale Tilly Dunnage, a seamstress who returns to her hometown years after she was accused of murder. She learnt to sew for the part and designed some of her own costumes. The project was filmed in the Australian desert and she found it difficult to wear couture dresses in the harsh weather. Despite disliking the film, Robert Abele of the Los Angeles Times credited Winslet for underplaying her over-the-top part. The film emerged as one of the highest-grossing Australian films of all time, but earned little elsewhere. Winslet won the AACTA Award for Best Actress.

While filming The Dressmaker, Winslet became aware of a forthcoming Steve Jobs biopic written by Aaron Sorkin and directed by Danny Boyle. Keen to play Jobs's marketing chief and confidante Joanna Hoffman, she sent a picture of herself dressed as Hoffman to the film's producer. Steve Jobs, starring Michael Fassbender in the title role, is told in three acts, each depicting a key milestone in Jobs's career. In preparation, Winslet spent time with Hoffman, and worked with a dialect coach to speak in Hoffman's accent, a mixture of Armenian and Polish, which she considered to be the most difficult of her career. The cast rehearsed each act like a play and filmed it in sequence. Winslet collaborated closely with Fassbender, and their off-screen relationship mirrored the collegial dynamic between Jobs and Hoffman. The film earned her some of the best reviews of her career, though it was a box-office flop. Peter Howell of the Toronto Star commended Winslet for finding "strength and grace" in her part, and Gregory Ellwood of HitFix thought she improved on Hoffman's characterisation. She won the Golden Globe and BAFTA Awards for Best Supporting Actress, and received her seventh Oscar nomination.

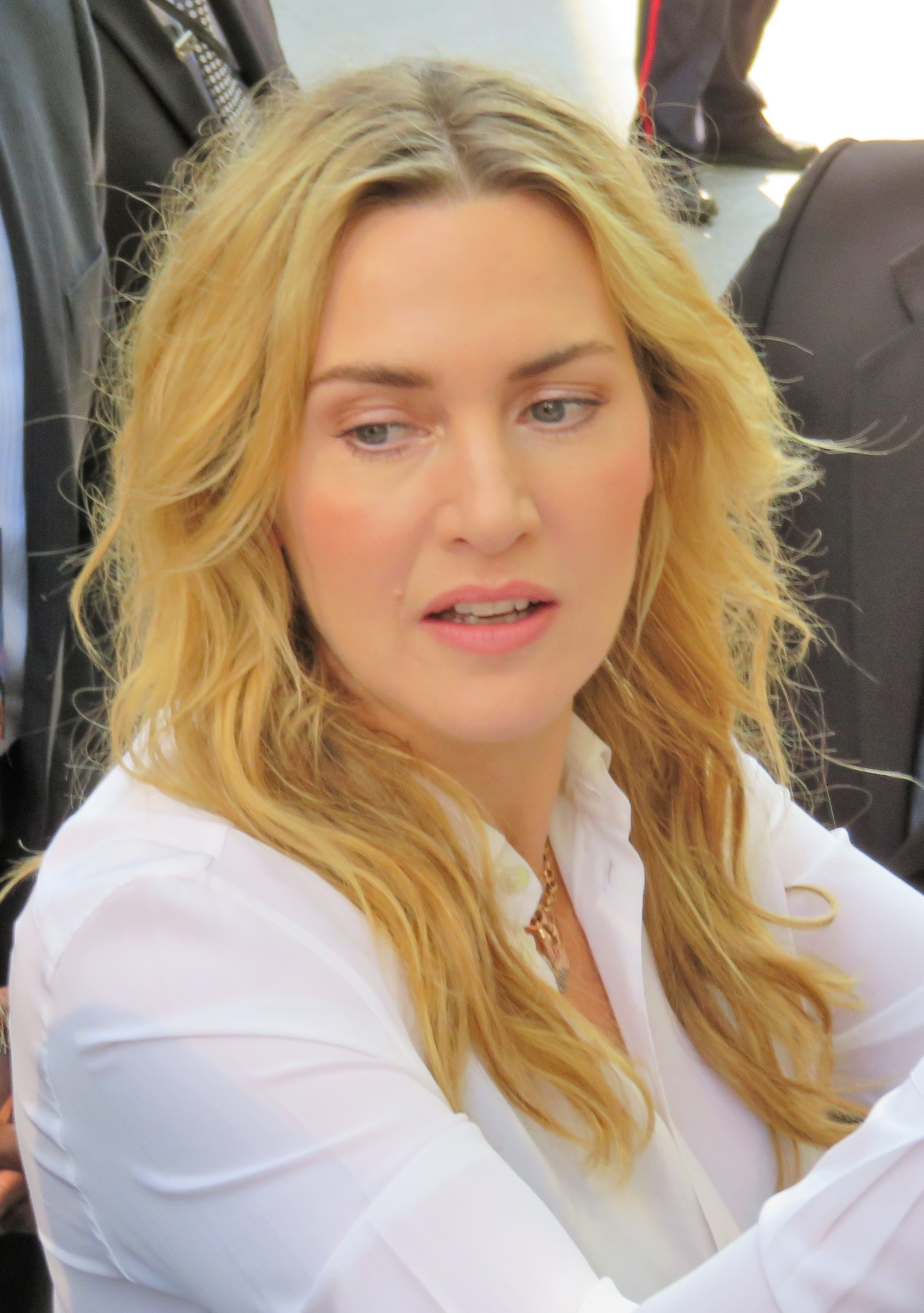
Winslet attending an event for The Mountain Between Us at the 2017 Toronto International Film Festival

John Hillcoat's ensemble crime-thriller Triple 9 (2016) featured Winslet as Irina Vlaslov, a ruthless Russian-Israeli gangster. The critic Ann Hornaday of The Washington Post felt Winslet had failed to effectively portray her. Her next release of the year, Collateral Beauty, about a man (played by Will Smith) struggling with the death of his daughter, was panned by critics. Writing for Vulture, Emily Yoshida dismissed the film as a vacuous remake of A Christmas Carol and added that Winslet had "never looked more painted and tired". It was a modest earner at the box office. Winslet agreed to the romantic disaster film The Mountain Between Us (2017) to take on the challenge of a role requiring physical exertion. It featured her and Idris Elba as two strangers who crash land on an icy and isolated mountain range. They filmed in the mountains of Western Canada at 10,000 feet (3,000 metres) above sea level where the temperature was well below freezing. Winslet performed her own stunts and described it as the most physically gruelling experience of her career. Moira Macdonald of The Seattle Times opined that the duo's charisma and chemistry enhanced a mediocre film.

Woody Allen's Wonder Wheel, a drama set in 1950s Coney Island, was Winslet's final release of 2017. She played Ginny, a temperamental housewife having an affair with a lifeguard (played by Justin Timberlake). She described Ginny as permanently dissatisfied and uneasy, and playing her proved difficult for Winslet, who experienced anxiety. Manohla Dargis of The New York Times disliked Allen's writing but credited Winslet for filling her "shabby character with feverish life". When asked during the film's promotion about her decision to work with Allen despite an allegation of child sexual abuse against him, Winslet chose not to comment on the filmmaker's personal life but said she was pleased with the collaboration. She would later go on to express regret over working with both Allen and Roman Polanski. In 2019, Winslet provided her voice to Moominvalley, an animated television series about the Moomins, and took on a leading role alongside Susan Sarandon and Mia Wasikowska in Blackbird, a remake of the Danish film Silent Heart (2014). Benjamin Lee of The Guardian dismissed it as "less of a film and more of an actors' workshop" and found Winslet miscast.

=== Resurgence and expansion (2020–present) ===
Winslet portrayed paleontologist Mary Anning in Ammonite (2020), a period drama about a romance between Anning and Charlotte Murchison (played by Saoirse Ronan) set in 1840s England. She dropped out of Wes Anderson's The French Dispatch to have more preparation time for the project. She collaborated closely with Ronan, and they choreographed their own sex scenes. For much of the filming, she lived in isolation in a rented cottage in Dorset, where the film was shot, to get into her character's headspace. Caryn James of the BBC credited Winslet for portraying Anning as "stern and brittle but immensely sympathetic" and considered her "contained, potent performance" to be one of the best of her career, and Manuel Betancourt of New York magazine welcomed it as a "return to form". She next voiced the titular horse in a film adaptation of the novel Black Beauty, which was released on Disney+.

In 2021, Winslet executive produced and starred in Mare of Easttown, an HBO miniseries about a troubled police detective solving a murder case. Since the story was set in Delaware County, Winslet insisted on using the "Delco accent", a version of Philadelphia English used in the county; she considered it to be one of the hardest accents she has had to learn. To play Mare, a woman who has lost a child to suicide, she created a backstory for her character and collaborated closely with a grief counsellor. The series and Winslet's performance received critical acclaim; Richard Roeper wrote that she "adds to a long list of magnificent, disappear-into-the-character performances" and Lucy Mangan of The Guardian opined, "If you can have a defining performance this late in a career, this is surely Winslet's." Mare of Easttown proved to be a ratings hit for HBO, and Winslet once again won the Primetime Emmy, Golden Globe, and SAG Awards for Best Actress in a miniseries.

Following Mare of Easttown, Winslet took a year off work to spend time with her family. She narrated the documentary Eleven Days in May (2022), about the 2021 bombing of Gaza by Israel. She starred with her daughter Mia Threapleton in an improvised feature-length episode of the Channel 4 anthology series I Am..., titled "I Am Ruth", about the negative effects of social media, which she developed and co-authored with director Dominic Savage. She won two BAFTA TV Awards for Best Actress and Best Single Drama (as producer). In her acceptance speech, she urged lawmakers to criminalise harmful digital content. In 2017 and 2018, Winslet concurrently filmed two sequels to James Cameron's science fiction film Avatar (2009) using motion capture technology. She learnt freediving for her role and was able to hold her breath underwater for seven minutes, setting a new record for any film scene shot underwater. Released in 2022, Avatar: The Way of Water earned over $2 billion to rank as the third highest-grossing film of all time and Winslet's second film after Titanic to cross the $2 billion mark.

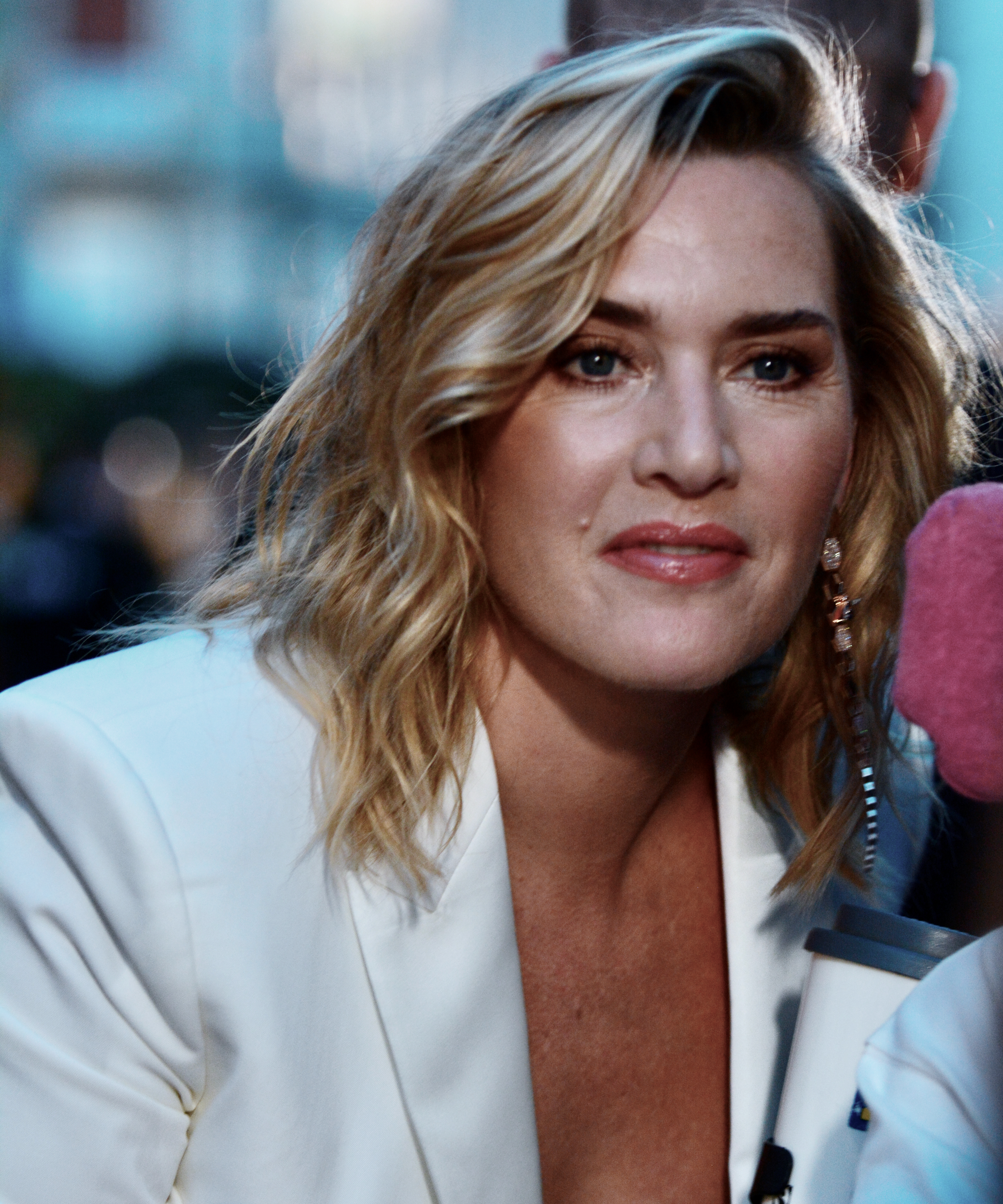
Winslet in 2023

After being attached to a biopic of model and war photographer Lee Miller for eight years, Winslet produced and starred in Lee (2023). She hired cinematographer Ellen Kuras (who had filmed her in Eternal Sunshine of the Spotless Mind) to make her feature directorial debut with the project. Winslet slipped and fell while filming, leading to three haematomas on her spine; she continued working despite the pain. Reviewers for The Hollywood Reporter and The Daily Beast noted how much Winslet's performance helped elevate a conventional biopic. Winslet next executive produced and starred in the HBO miniseries The Regime (2024), a satire about a fictional authoritarian country. To play a megalomaniac dictator, she consulted a neuroscientist and a psychotherapist to create a backstory for her character. Critics deemed her performance superior to the series. She earned Golden Globe nominations for her performances in both Lee and The Regime, in addition to a BAFTA nomination for Outstanding British Film as a producer on Lee.

In 2025, Winslet reprised her role in the sequel Avatar: Fire and Ash. She made her directorial debut with the Netflix drama film Goodbye June, written by her son Joe Anders, in which she also starred and produced. Director Andy Serkis and producer Peter Jackson spent much of 2025 convincing Winslet to move her family from the United Kingdom to New Zealand for the duration of filming for The Lord of the Rings: The Hunt for Gollum (2027) so she could join the cast.

== Reception and acting style ==
Journalists consider Winslet to be among the finest actresses of her generation. Despite achieving stardom early in her career with the blockbuster Titanic, she has rarely acted in commerce-driven films. A journalist for Elle believes that her choices reflect the "soul and attitude of a jobbing actress, trapped in the body of a movie star". Winslet was voted one of the 50 greatest actors of all time in a 2022 readers' poll by Empire; the magazine termed her "a dramatic force, turning her hand to all kinds of periods and genres with an inimitable sense of dignity and strength". In 2025, The Independent named Winslet the 45th-greatest actor of the 21st century, and in 2026, Variety ranked her as the eighty-fourth-best film star of all time.

Winslet belongs to a group of esteemed British actresses who are typically showing "restraint, rendering emotions through intellect rather than feelings, and a sense of irony, which demonstrates the heroine's superior understanding". Tom Perrotta, the author of Little Children, has said that Winslet "gravitates toward troubling roles in smaller films", typically those of "thorny, potentially unsympathetic" women. The journalist Mark Harris writes that she specialises in "unsentimentalized, restless, troubled, discontented, disconcerted, difficult women" and John Hiscock of The Daily Telegraph has identified a theme of characters who are free-spirited with a sexual edge to them. Anthony Lane of The New Yorker wrote that "it's hard to find an instance in which she has not given stubbornness a good name". Stephen Whitty of NJ.com associates Winslet with "serious, almost despairing material", although he finds it hard to pigeonhole her as an actress. Josephine Livingstone of The New Republic, however, finds Winslet unconvincing in roles where she has "no real emotional vulnerability", believing she is most compelling when she has "the opportunity to get hysterical".

"I can't just learn my lines and do [my job], but perhaps that's because I don't want to act, I want to be. And I do think there's a difference."

— Winslet on acting

Leonardo DiCaprio, her co-star in Titanic and Revolutionary Road, considers Winslet to be "the most prepared and well-researched actor on set", and Jude Law, her co-star in The Holiday, believes that despite her seriousness she remains "very calm and good-natured". Her Steve Jobs director Danny Boyle has identified a willingness in Winslet to avoid typecasting and said that she takes an effort "to reposition directors' and producers' perspective on her" to allow herself to be challenged as an artist.

Winslet has said she is interested in playing "angst-ridden women" with strong dispositions masking flaws and insecurities, and that she connects with "women who are either finding their way out of a situation, looking for love, having some struggle within love, or questioning the big things in life". Drawn to parts that are in tandem with her personal struggles at certain points in her life, she finds it difficult to detach herself from her roles, saying that "you have to confront your true feelings every single day. And that's pretty exhausting. Then you have to go home and make dinner". Even so, she finds it therapeutic to perform. Winslet is known for her willingness to perform nude scenes, having done so in over a dozen of her films, although she considers its contribution to the narrative before agreeing to it. She believes that such scenes promote a positive body image amongst women.

== Personal life ==
While filming Dark Season, a fifteen-year-old Winslet began a romantic relationship with actor-writer Stephen Tredre, who was twelve years her senior. She considered him a major influence in her life and they lived together in London from 1991. They broke up in 1995, but remained close until Tredre died of bone cancer two years later. Winslet decided not to attend the premiere of Titanic to attend his funeral. In 2008, she said that she had not got over his death.

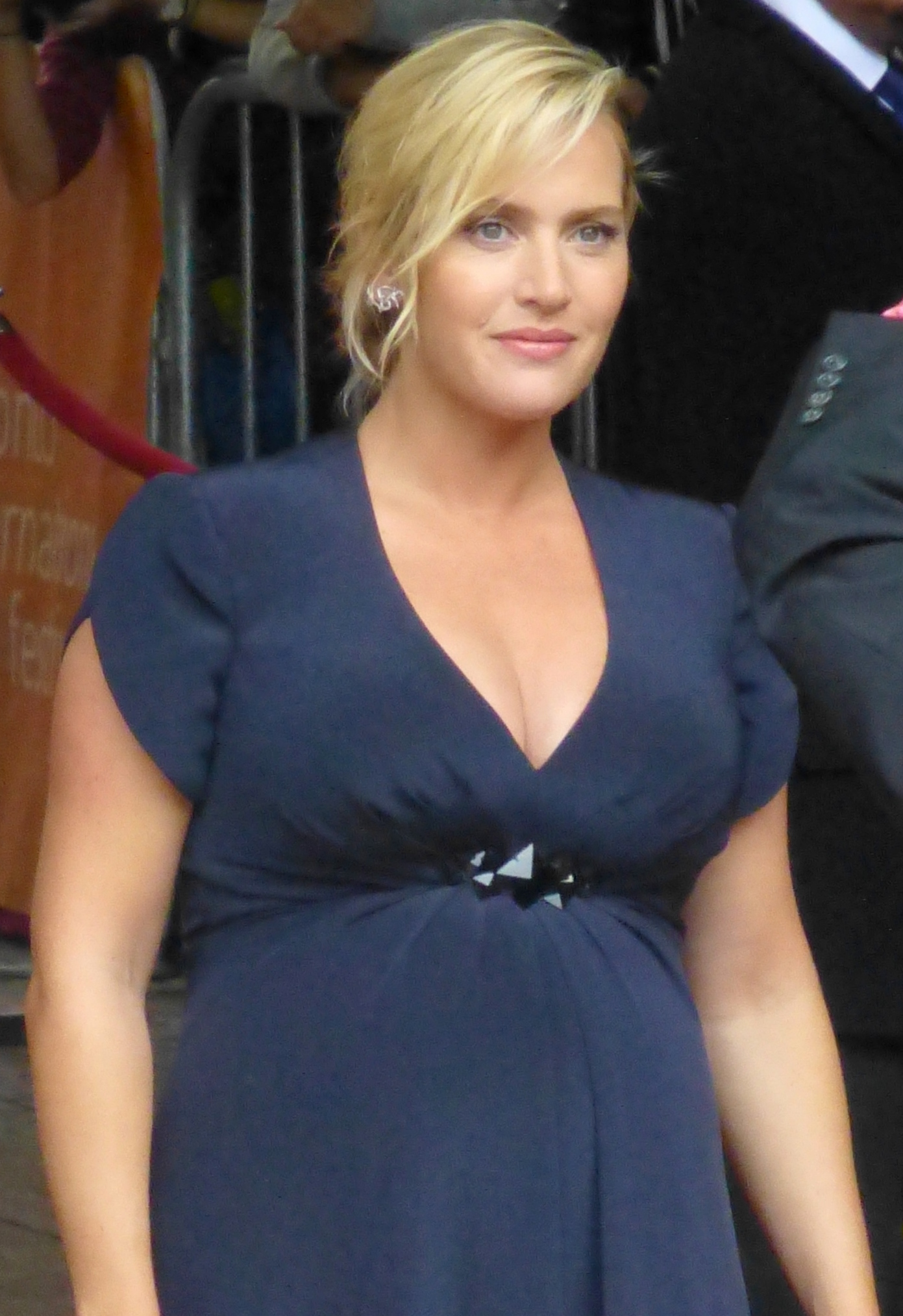
Winslet, pregnant with her third child, in 2013

A year after Tredre's death, Winslet met Jim Threapleton on the set of Hideous Kinky, on which he served as an assistant director. They married in November 1998 at her family's local church, and their daughter, Mia, was born in 2000. Describing her marriage to Threapleton as a "mess", Winslet later said that she lost control of her instincts during this period. They divorced in 2001.

Soon after separating from Threapleton, she met director Sam Mendes when he offered her a part in a play; she turned down the offer but began dating him. Dismayed at how the British tabloids portrayed her personal life, Winslet relocated to New York City. She married Mendes in May 2003 on the island of Anguilla, and their son, Joe Anders, was born later that year. The family divided their time in New York with frequent visits to their estate in the Cotswolds, England. Amid intense media speculation of an affair between Mendes and actress Rebecca Hall, he and Winslet announced their separation in 2010 and were divorced a year later. She reported being heartbroken by the split, but affirmed her determination to look after her children in spite of her marital break-up. In 2010, Winslet moved with her children from New York back to England to avoid paparazzi.

While holidaying at Richard Branson's estate on Necker Island in 2011, Winslet met his nephew Edward Abel Smith (legally known as Ned Rocknroll from 2008 to 2019), the head of marketing promotion and astronaut experience at Virgin Galactic, during a house fire. They married in December 2012 in New York, and their son was born the following year. Following their wedding, Abel Smith became a stay-at-home parent helping Winslet raise her children, and also helping her practise her lines despite being severely dyslexic. He later added "Winslet" as one of his middle names. After moving back to England, Winslet purchased a property worth £3.25 million by the sea in West Wittering, Sussex, where she lives with Abel Smith and her children as of 2015. She commented on how much she enjoyed living in the countryside.

Winslet has stated that despite three marriages and a family structure that might be perceived by some as "unconventional", she does not consider it to be any "less of a family". She turns down offers of work that otherwise would take her away from her children for too long, and likes to schedule her filming commitments around their school holidays. Discussing her parenting style, she said she enjoys packing lunches and doing the school run.

== Activism and charity ==
Winslet has lent her support to several charities and causes, along with financial donations and items for auctions. In 2006, she became a patron of a Gloucester-based charity, the Family Haven, which provides counselling services to vulnerable families. The same year, hand-made envelopes designed by Winslet were auctioned for the "Pushing the Envelope" campaign created by the National Literacy Trust. Winslet was one of the celebrities to participate in a 2007 auction to raise funds for the Afghanistan Relief Organization. In 2009, she contributed to the Butterfly Book, a compilation of doodles made by several celebrities, to raise money for leukaemia research. Also that year, Winslet, along with Leonardo DiCaprio, James Cameron, and Celine Dion, contributed $30,000 to support Millvina Dean, the last living Titanic survivor at the time. The funds covered nursing home fees in the UK where Dean resided.

In 2009, Winslet narrated the English version of an Icelandic documentary named A Mother's Courage: Talking Back to Autism, about Margret Ericsdottir, whose child Keli Thorsteinsson has non-verbal autism. Inspired by the story, she teamed with Ericsdottir in 2010 to form an NGO named the Golden Hat Foundation. The organisation aims to create autism awareness and was named after a poem written by Thorsteinsson. As the ambassador for the luxury brands Lancôme and Longines, Winslet partnered with these companies to raise awareness and funds for the foundation. She created a make-up collection for Lancôme in 2011 and, in 2017, she designed a new watch for Longines.

In 2012, Winslet wrote a book about autism, entitled The Golden Hat: Talking Back to Autism, which was published by Simon & Schuster. It contains correspondence between Winslet and Ericsdottir, personal statements from various celebrities, and contributions from Thorsteinsson. A reviewer for Publishers Weekly praised the book for its "warmth and sincerity". The United Nations featured the book during a ceremony on the World Autism Awareness Day of 2012. For her work with the Golden Hat Foundation, Winslet received Spain's Yo Dona award for Best Humanitarian Work.

Winslet narrated a video for PETA in 2010 that showed animal cruelty in the production of foie gras. She encouraged chefs to remove the item from their menu and urged consumers to boycott it. In 2015, she lent her support to the UNICEF campaign World's Largest Lesson, which creates awareness among children about sustainable development and global citizenship. Teased as a child for her weight, Winslet takes a stand against body-shaming and bullying. She narrated an Australian animated short film named Daisy Chain (2015), about a victim of cyberbullying. In 2017, Winslet teamed with Leonardo DiCaprio's environmental foundation for a fundraiser on global warming. Also that year, she and DiCaprio auctioned a private dinner with themselves to raise money for a British woman's cancer treatment. Winslet teamed with Lancôme and the National Literacy Trust in 2018 to launch a programme that aims to educate underprivileged women in the UK. In 2020, Winslet read a bedtime story as part of Save with Stories to raise funds for Save the Children's Emergency Coronavirus Appeal. In 2021, Winslet commented on homophobia in Hollywood, saying that she knew actors "who are terrified their sexuality will be revealed and that it will stand in the way of their being cast in straight roles". In 2025, Winslet was appointed as an ambassador for The King's Foundation.

== Public image ==
In a 2015 article for Elle, Sally Holmes described Winslet's ability to establish rapport with her manner. Jo Ellison of Vogue writes that she has an "authoritative, almost ambassadorial aura", and Kira Cochrane of The Guardian considers her to be "articulate, sophisticated, [with] a definite hint of grandeur". Describing Winslet as plain-spoken, Krista Smith of Vanity Fair believes that despite her stardom she is unpretentious.

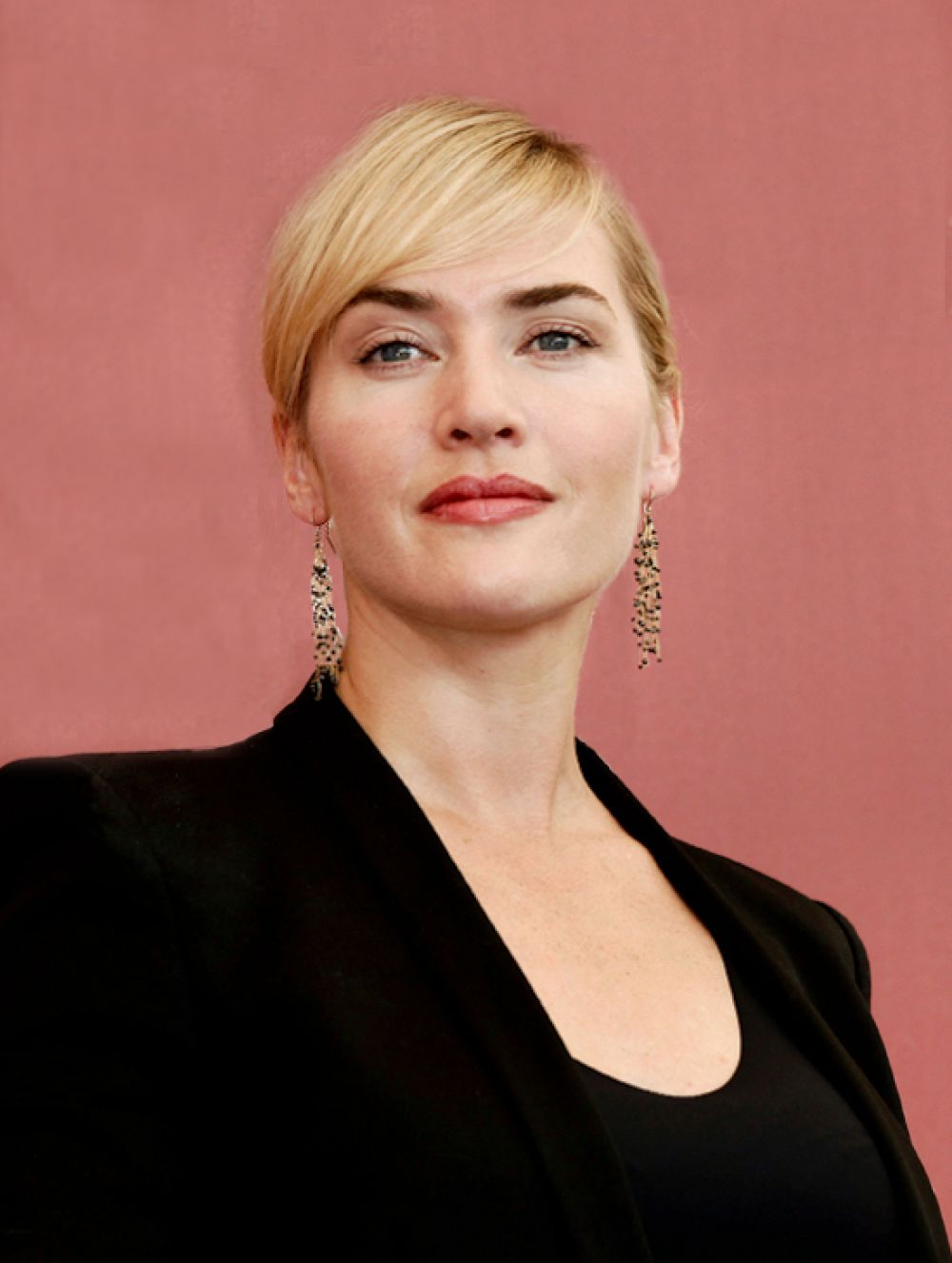
Winslet at the 2011 Venice International Film Festival

Winslet's weight fluctuations over the years have been well-documented by the media. She has been outspoken in her refusal to allow Hollywood to dictate her weight. In 2003, the British edition of GQ magazine published photographs of Winslet which had been digitally altered to make her look thinner and taller. She said the alterations were made without her consent, and GQ subsequently issued an apology. In 2007, Winslet won a libel case against Grazia magazine after it claimed she had visited a dietitian. She claimed £10,000 in damages, and donated the amount to an eating disorder charity. She won another case in 2009 against the British tabloid Daily Mail after it claimed she had lied about her exercise regimen. She received an apology and a payout of £25,000.

Winslet was included on People magazine's "Most Beautiful People" listing in 2005. Her beauty and sex appeal have been picked up by several other publications, including Harper's Bazaar, Who, and Empire magazines. She has said she does not subscribe to the beauty ideal of Hollywood, and uses her celebrity to empower women to accept their appearance with pride. She has spoken against Botox and plastic surgery. In an effort to encourage natural ageing, she formed the British Anti-Cosmetic Surgery League, alongside fellow actresses Emma Thompson and Rachel Weisz. She instructs magazines and brands not to digitally smooth her wrinkles in photographs. Winslet is reluctant to discuss the gender pay gap in the film industry, as she dislikes speaking publicly about her salary. She has expressed an aversion to elaborate press junkets and red carpet events, terming them a waste of money.

In 2009, Forbes reported her annual salary to be $2 million, a majority of that stemming from her endorsement deals. Also that year, the UK Film Council calculated that she had earned £20 million from her acting roles since 1995. She was named one of the 100 most influential people in the world by Time magazine in 2009 and 2021. Madame Tussauds in London unveiled a wax statue of Winslet in 2011. The following year, she received the Honorary César award, and in 2014, she received a star on the Hollywood Walk of Fame. Winslet was appointed Commander of the Order of the British Empire (CBE) in the 2012 Birthday Honours for her services to drama.

== Acting credits and awards ==
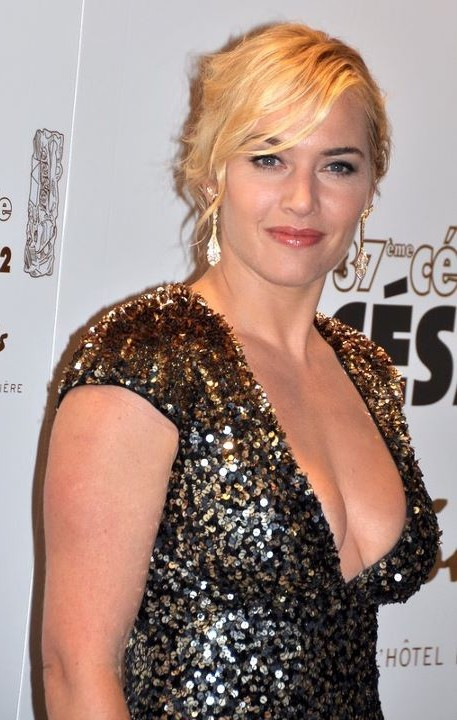
Winslet at the 2012 César Awards

Prolific in film since 1994, Winslet's most acclaimed and highest-grossing films, according to the online portal Box Office Mojo and the review aggregate site Rotten Tomatoes, include Heavenly Creatures (1994), Sense and Sensibility (1995), Hamlet (1996), Titanic (1997), Eternal Sunshine of the Spotless Mind (2004), Finding Neverland (2004), The Holiday (2006), Contagion (2011), Divergent (2014), Insurgent (2015), Steve Jobs (2015), and Avatar: The Way of Water (2022). Her television projects include the miniseries Mildred Pierce (2011) and Mare of Easttown (2021).

Winslet has been recognised by the Academy of Motion Picture Arts and Sciences for the following performances:

- 68th Academy Awards: Best Supporting Actress, nomination, for Sense and Sensibility (1995)
- 70th Academy Awards: Best Actress, nomination, for Titanic (1997)
- 74th Academy Awards: Best Supporting Actress, nomination, for Iris (2001)
- 77th Academy Awards: Best Actress, nomination, for Eternal Sunshine of the Spotless Mind (2004)
- 79th Academy Awards: Best Actress, nomination, for Little Children (2006)
- 81st Academy Awards: Best Actress, win, for The Reader (2008)
- 88th Academy Awards: Best Supporting Actress, nomination, for Steve Jobs (2015)

Winslet has won five BAFTA Awards: Best Actress in a Leading Role for The Reader (2008); Best Actress in a Supporting Role for Sense and Sensibility (1995) and Steve Jobs (2015); Best Leading Actress and Best Single Drama for I Am Ruth. She has also won two Primetime Emmy Awards for Outstanding Actress in a Leading Role in a Limited or Anthology Series or Movie for Mildred Pierce (2011), and Mare of Easttown (2021) as well as the Grammy Award for Best Spoken Word Album for Children for narrating the children's audiobook Listen to the Storyteller (1999). Winslet is the recipient of five Golden Globe Awards from the Hollywood Foreign Press Association, winning Best Supporting Actress – Motion Picture for The Reader and Steve Jobs, Best Actress in a Motion Picture – Drama for Revolutionary Road, and Best Actress in a Miniseries or Motion Picture – Television for Mildred Pierce and Mare of Easttown. She is among the few actresses to have won three of the four major American entertainment awards.

== See also ==
- Agra katewinsletae – Species of beetle named after Kate Winslet
- List of EGOT winners § Without a Tony
- List of oldest and youngest Academy Award winners and nominees § Youngest nominees 3
