= I Am... (TV series) =

- Genre: Drama
- Created by: Dominic Savage
- Starring: Vicky McClure; Samantha Morton; Gemma Chan; Suranne Jones; Letitia Wright; Lesley Manville; Kate Winslet; Nicola Coughlan
- Country of origin: United Kingdom
- Original language: English
- No. of series: 4
- No. of episodes: 9

Production
- Producers: Krishnendu Majumdar; Josh Hyams
- Running time: 46-90 minutes
- Production company: Me+You Productions

Original release
- Network: Channel 4
- Release: 23 July 2019 – present

I Am... is a female-led drama anthology series of standalone stories created by Dominic Savage for Channel 4. Each episode is developed and written by Dominic Savage in collaboration with the leading actress.

== Background ==
Created, written and directed by filmmaker Dominic Savage, each episode of I Am... centres on a titular character which the episode is named after. Each standalone story was developed in a creative partnership with the leading actor, with improvised dialogue and themes including relationships, mental health, and empowerment.

Filming for the first series took place in 29 days, effectively 10 days per episode. According to I Am...'s producer Krishnendu Majumdar, the filmmakers wanted an intimate but cinematic look for the episodes. Majumdar said the whole series was shot hand-held "as though we are eavesdropping on the characters", in order to add to the documentary feel of the drama.

== Episodes ==
Series	Episodes	Originally released	
Series	Episodes	First released	Last released
1	3	23 July 2019	6 August 2019
2	3	5 August 2021	19 August 2021
3	1	8 December 2022	
4	2	16 November 2026	17 November 2026

=== Series 1 (2019) ===
No. overall	No. in series	Title	Directed by	Written by	Original release date	Viewers (millions)
1	1	"I Am Nicola"	Dominic Savage	Dominic Savage (writer) & Vicky McClure (story)	23 July 2019	N/A
2	2	"I Am Kirsty"	Dominic Savage	Dominic Savage (writer) & Samantha Morton (story)	30 July 2019	N/A
3	3	"I Am Hannah"	Dominic Savage	Dominic Savage (writer) & Gemma Chan (story)	6 August 2019	N/A

=== Series 2 (2021) ===
No. overall	No. in series	Title	Directed by	Written by	Original release date	Viewers (millions)
4	1	"I Am Victoria"	Dominic Savage	Dominic Savage (writer) & Suranne Jones (story)	5 August 2021	2.13
5	2	"I Am Danielle"	Dominic Savage	Dominic Savage (writer) & Letitia Wright (story)	12 August 2021	N/A
6	3	"I Am Maria"	Dominic Savage	Dominic Savage (writer) & Lesley Manville (story)	19 August 2021	0.53

=== Series 3 (2022) ===
No. overall	No. in series	Title	Directed by	Written by	Original release date	Viewers (millions)
7	1	"I Am Ruth"	Dominic Savage	Dominic Savage (writer) & Kate Winslet (story)	8 December 2022	N/A

=== Series 4 (2026) ===
No. overall	No. in series	Title	Directed by	Written by	Original release date	Viewers (millions)
8	1	"I Am Helen"	Dominic Savage	Dominic Savage (writer) & Nicola Coughlan (story)	16 November 2026	TBD
9	2	"I Am Helen"	Dominic Savage	Dominic Savage (writer) & Nicola Coughlan (story)	17 November 2026	TBD

== Accolades ==
Year	Award	Category	Nominee(s)	Result	Ref.
2019	Royal Television Society Craft & Design Awards	Photography - Drama & Comedy	Stuart Bentley (for "I Am Kirsty")	Nominated	
2020	British Academy Television Awards	Best Actress	Samantha Morton (for "I Am Kirsty")	Nominated	
2022	British Academy Television Awards	Best Single Drama	Dominic Savage, Krishnendu Majumdar, Richard Yee, Suranne Jones, Josh Hyams, David Charap (for "I Am Victoria")	Nominated	
2023	Royal Television Society Programme Awards	Leading Actor: Female	Kate Winslet (for "I Am Ruth")	Won	
2023	British Academy Television Awards	Best Single Drama	Dominic Savage, Krishnendu Majumdar, Josh Hyams, Kate Winslet, Richard Yee, David Charap (for "I Am Ruth")	Won	
2023	British Academy Television Awards	Best Actress	Kate Winslet (for "I Am Ruth")	Won	
2023	British Academy Television Craft Awards	Best Photography & Lighting: Fiction	Rachel Clark (for "I Am Ruth")	Nominated	
