= Victorian Psycho =

Victorian Psycho may refer to:

- Victorian Psycho (novel), 2025, by Virginia Feito
- Victorian Psycho (film), 2026, adaptation of the novel
