= God Is a Bullet =

God Is a Bullet may refer to:

- God Is a Bullet (novel), 1999 novel by Boston Teran
  - God Is a Bullet (film), 2023 film based on the novel
- God Is a Bullet (album), 2007 album by The Mission
- "God Is a Bullet" (song), 1989 song by Concrete Blonde
