= Julia Jackman =

Canadian filmmaker

Julia Jackman, also known as Julia Hart, is a director and screenwriter born in Edmonton, Alberta.

== Career ==
She started writing and directing short films in 2015. She directed her first feature film Bonus Track, in 2023.

Jackman worked for Stephen Fry at his production company Sprout Pictures.

In 2018, she was selected to take part in the Canadian Film Center Directors’ Lab. During that program, she wrote and directed the short film Upshot.

In 2023, her first feature film Bonus Track premiered at the London Film Festival and Tallinn. It was also part of the Great 8 line up at Cannes.

In 2025, she directed the movie 100 Nights of Hero, based on the graphic novel of the same name by Isabel Greenberg and starring Emma Corrin, Charli XCX, Maika Monroe, Nicholas Galitzine, Richard E. Grant, Amir El-Masry and Felicity Jones. The film premiered at the Venice Critics' Week on September 6, 2025.

== Filmography ==
=== Feature films ===
Year	Title	Director	Writer	Producer	Notes
2023	Bonus Track	Yes	No	No	
2025	100 Nights of Hero	Yes	Yes	Executive	

=== Short films ===
Year	Title	Director	Writer	Producer	Notes
2015	Emma, Change The Locks	Yes	Yes	No	
2016	Your Mother and I	No	Yes	No	
2016	Kid Gloves	Yes	Yes	No	
2017	Sparta North	Yes	Yes	Co-producer	
2018	23 Red	Yes	Yes	No	
2019	James	Yes	Yes	No	
2019	Upshot	Yes	Yes	No	
2022	The Riley Sisters	Yes	Yes	No	
2024	Pigs	Yes	No	Yes	

== Awards and nominations ==
- 2017: LA Shorts Awards nomination for Best Short Film for Kid Gloves
- 2017: New Talent Award at the BFI Future Film Festival for Emma, Change The Locks
