= God Is a Bullet (film) =

2023 film by Nick Cassavetes

- Film poster
- Directed by: Nick Cassavetes
- Written by: Nick Cassavetes
- Based on: God Is a Bullet by Boston Teran
- Produced by: Michael Mendelsohn; Donald V. Allen
- Starring: Nikolaj Coster-Waldau; Maika Monroe; Jamie Foxx
- Cinematography: Kenji Katori
- Edited by: Bella Erikson
- Music by: Aaron Zigman
- Production companies: Patriot Pictures; XYZ Films; Itaca Films
- Distributed by: Wayward Entertainment
- Release date: June 23, 2023
- Running time: 156 minutes
- Country: United States
- Language: English

God Is a Bullet is a 2023 American action thriller film written and directed by Nick Cassavetes and starring Nikolaj Coster-Waldau, Maika Monroe, and Jamie Foxx. It is based on the 1999 novel of the same name by Boston Teran.

God Is a Bullet was released in the United States by Wayward Entertainment on June 23, 2023.

== Plot ==
Detective Bob Hightower finds his ex-wife murdered and his teenage daughter kidnapped by an insidious satanic cult. Hightower takes matters into his own hands and infiltrates the secretive cult with the help of the cult's only female victim escapee, Case Hardin. Hightower and Hardin team up with The Ferryman, a shadowy "social renegade", to save Bob's daughter and to find closure for Hardin from the cult and its maniacal leader Cyrus.

== Cast ==
- Maika Monroe as Case Hardin
- Nikolaj Coster-Waldau as Bob Hightower
- Karl Glusman as Cyrus
- January Jones as Maureen Bacon
- Jamie Foxx as The Ferryman
- Paul Johansson as John Lee Bacon
- David Thornton as Arthur Naci
- Ethan Suplee as Gutter
- Jonathan Tucker as Errol Grey
- Brendan Sexton III as Granny Boy
- Garrett Wareing as Wood
- Chloe Guy as Gabi

== Production ==
Principal photography began in Mexico City in May 2021 and wrapped up in New Mexico in August 2021.

Sidney Kimmel served as an executive producer of the film, having previously worked with writer-director Cassavetes on Alpha Dog (2006).

== Release ==
God is a Bullet was released in the United States on June 23, 2023, before a releasing on digital formats on July 11. It was the first film to be theatrically released by Wayward Entertainment, who acquired the distribution rights in April 2023.

== Reception ==
On the review aggregator website Rotten Tomatoes, 24% of 37 critics' reviews are positive, with an average rating of 4.3/10. Metacritic, which uses a weighted average, assigned the film a score of 31 out of 100, based on nine critics, indicating "generally unfavorable" reviews.

Robert Abele from the Los Angeles Times wrote, "The hack-noir of God Is a Bullet is one long slog". Mary Beth McAndrews of Dread Central awarded the film one and a half stars out of five and wrote, "Cassavetes gets in his own way with a bloated attempt at exploitation that goes so far as to be more boring than interesting." Whang Yee Ling of The Straits Times awarded the film two stars and wrote, "But no number of David Bowie and Bob Dylan on the soundtrack will make this exploitation picture the arty thriller Cassavetes seems to think it is." Christian Zilko of IndieWire graded the film a C− and wrote, "A tighter edit that prioritized the rescue plot over meandering character development probably could have turned God Is a Bullet into a fun airplane movie, but Cassavetes’ arthouse ambitions always resurface at inopportune times."

Robert Daniels of RogerEbert.com awarded the film one and a half stars and wrote, "If God is a bullet, it can’t come fast enough." Keith Garlington of the Arkansas Democrat-Gazette gave the film a negative review and wrote, "God Is a Bullet is hopelessly dark and dour -- a seemingly endless two hour 35 minute malaise of misery that eventually wears you down and even worse tests your patience." Meagan Navarro of Bloody Disgusting awarded the film three "skulls" out of five and wrote, "The filmmaker’s staging and the natural charm and charisma of Coster-Waldau and Monroe, no matter how buried under grit and tattoos, offsets the otherwise familiar setup." Dennis Harvey of Variety gave the film a negative review and wrote, "These 156 minutes, (...), are not exactly dull. But they are rather ludicrous, without being much fun."

Richard Whitaker of The Austin Chronicle awarded the film three stars out of five and wrote, "But the resolute commitment to finding tiny sparks of hope in a pitch-black cosmos yields its own bitter and oddly warming reward." Luke Y. Thompson of The A.V. Club graded the film a D+ and wrote, "Cut God Is A Bullet down to a tight 90 minutes, and it might at least consistently deliver the cheap thrills and nihilistic kick it only occasionally achieves." Ross McIndoe of Slant Magazine awarded the film one and a half stars out of five and wrote, "Aside from the red stuff, the film is scarcely interested in what's inside its characters." Frank Scheck of The Hollywood Reporter gave the film a negative review and wrote that it "Shoots itself in the foot."

Jeannette Catsoulis of The New York Times gave the film a negative review and wrote, "But the misogyny of the movie’s risibly sadistic villains is only one distasteful thread in this sleazy saga of rescue and revenge." Peter Martin of Screen Anarchy gave the film a positive review and wrote, "As Bob and Case, Nikolaj Coster-Waldau and Maika Monroe capture the personalities of characters who are often as scary to watch as anyone else on screen. Their shared intensity starts high and kicks quickly into overdrive, which animates the film past the breaking point." Bob Strauss of the San Francisco Chronicle gave the film a negative review and wrote, "The result is a distasteful, overlong slog, but at least the filmmaker appears to have put everything he wanted to up on the screen."
