= Isabel Greenberg =

British graphic novelist and illustrator

Isabel Poppy Greenberg (born 1988) is a British graphic novelist and illustrator.

Her first book, The Encyclopedia of Early Earth, was published in 2013 by Jonathan Cape in the United Kingdom; Little, Brown and Company in the United States, and Penguin Random House in Canada. Greenberg also made a short film in 2018 entitled "Janet, Who Fell From The Sea".

== Early life ==
Born in Camden, London, England, in 1988, Greenberg studied illustration at the University of Brighton School of Art and graduated in 2011.

In 2008, while still a student, Greenberg entered the Observer/Cape/Comica Graphic Short Story Prize and was a runner-up. She entered the competition again in 2011 and won it with "Love in a Very Cold Climate", a love story about a Nord, a North Pole-dweller, and Suit, a South Pole-dweller, who can never touch each other.

== Career ==
In 2013, Greenberg was one of twenty graphic designers and illustrators to feature in the Memory Palace exhibition at the Victoria and Albert Museum, sponsored by Sky Arts. For the exhibition, an original piece of fiction by Hari Kunzru was transformed into a "walk-in graphic novel."

In 2014, she was commissioned as part of the Pick Me Up Selects contemporary arts festival series at Somerset House.

Greenberg has done work for The Guardian, The New York Times, the National Trust, Seven Stories Press, First Second Books, and Nobrow Press. She has also worked with Chatham Dockyard, Tyntesfield House, and the English Folk Dance and Song Society.

=== Graphic novels ===
Greenberg's first graphic novel, The Encyclopedia of Early Earth (2013), is a series of interlinking stories set in Early Earth. Rachel Cooke, reviewing it in The Guardian, said it "already feels like a classic" and compared her to Tove Jansson. It has been translated into German, Spanish, French, and Polish.

In 2016, Greenberg released her second graphic novel, The One Hundred Nights of Hero. A movie adaptation came out in 2025, directed by Julia Jackman and starring Emma Corrin, Maika Monroe, and Nicholas Galitzine.

In her graphic novel Glass Town (2020), parts of Brontë family juvenilia are retold and intersect with the lives of four Brontë children Charlotte, Branwell, Emily, and Anne, as they explore the paracosm they created. James Smart, for The Guardian, wrote: "Greenberg blurs fiction and memoir: characters walk between worlds and woo their creators. [...] This is a tale, bookended by funerals, about the collision between dreamlike places of possibility and constrained 19th-century lives."

=== Children's books ===
Greenberg has also written and illustrated several children's books, including The Midnight Babies (Abrams Books, 2023) and Time to Go, Sid! (Abrams, 2026). She illustrated the book A Hundred Billion Trillion Stars by Seth Fishman, which won the 2018 Mathical Book Prize. Also in 2018, she illustrated Athena: The Story of a Goddess, by her younger sister Imogen Greenberg.
