= Labor Day (film) =

- Theatrical release poster
- Directed by: Jason Reitman
- Screenplay by: Jason Reitman
- Based on: Labor Day by Joyce Maynard
- Produced by: Lianne Halfon; Russell Smith; Jason Reitman; Helen Estabrook
- Starring: Kate Winslet; Josh Brolin; Gattlin Griffith; Tobey Maguire
- Cinematography: Eric Steelberg
- Edited by: Dana E. Glauberman
- Music by: Rolfe Kent
- Production companies: Indian Paintbrush; Right of Way Films; Mr. Mudd
- Distributed by: Paramount Pictures
- Release dates: August 29, 2013 (Telluride Film Festival); December 27, 2013 (United States)
- Running time: 111 minutes
- Country: United States
- Language: English
- Budget: $18 million
- Box office: $20.2 million

Labor Day is a 2013 American drama film written and directed by Jason Reitman, based on the 2009 novel by Joyce Maynard. The film stars Kate Winslet and Josh Brolin and was co-produced by Paramount Pictures and Indian Paintbrush.

Depressed single mom Adele and her son Henry help the wounded, needy Frank with a ride and a place to lay low. As the search for the escaped convict goes on, the mother and son connect with him, coming close to moving with him to Canada.

The film premiered at the Telluride Film Festival on August 29, 2013, and was a Special Presentation at the 2013 Toronto International Film Festival. It was later released in the United States on December 27, 2013.

== Plot ==
In 1987, Adele Wheeler is a single mother who lives in a rural home with her young son, Henry. She has lived in a state of depression since having a number of miscarriages, and Henry’s father left her because he was unable to live with her overwhelming sadness. She is uncomfortable in public and rarely leaves home.

While Adele and Henry are shopping just before the Labor Day weekend, a man approaches them and forces them to take him home with them. They learn that he is Frank Chambers, an escaped convict wanted by police.

Frank is a Vietnam War veteran who married his girlfriend, Mandy, after she gave birth to a baby, but he eventually learned that he was not the child's father. After he discovered that she was cheating on him, they had a fight; Frank pushed her and she fell, dying when her head hit a radiator. He was sentenced to prison for murder.

To thank Adele for sheltering him, Frank fixes up her house and yard and performs household chores as well as maintenance work on her car. In return, she gives him dancing lessons. Frank teaches Henry how to change a car tire and how to pitch and hit a baseball. He also shows Adele and Henry how to bake a peach pie. Adele and Frank fall in love and decide to escape to Canada with Henry.

Meanwhile, Henry develops a friendship with a girl his age. She scares him into thinking that Adele and Frank will abandon him, but Adele assures Henry that she would never leave him. In a final encounter, the girl guesses that Frank is the man in Henry's home.

The morning of their planned departure, the day after Labor Day, Henry leaves a note in his father's mailbox. While he is walking home, a police officer sees him and insists on driving him home. The officer, suspicious, notices their packed car and sees that the house is nearly empty, but he eventually leaves. Adele goes to the bank with Henry to withdraw all her money, which leads to questions from the staff, but Henry's quick thinking dispels their suspicions. At the same time, Adele's friend Evelyn stops by at the house and sees Frank there, also noticing that the house has been cleaned out; Frank claims to be a handyman and to be unaware of Adele's plans, and Evelyn leaves, unconvinced.

When Adele and Henry return home, Frank tells them that Henry's father called and left a message, having found the note. Before they can escape, they hear police sirens approaching. Frank ties Henry and Adele up so that they will not be charged with harboring a fugitive. He kisses Adele, then walks out and surrenders. She wants to make a statement to help Frank in his case, but the prosecutor warns her that if she does, she could be charged and Henry could be taken away from her. She tries unsuccessfully to visit Frank in prison and also writes many letters to him, but he eventually returns them all unopened.

Adele relinquishes custody of Henry to his father, and he lives with him until moving back in with her in his final year of high school. He begins baking, following Frank's recipe.

Years later, Henry has become the owner of a bakery and is featured in a magazine. Frank sees the article and writes a letter in which he tells Henry he will be released soon and inquires into Adele's circumstances. Henry replies that his mother is still living alone in the same house.

When Frank is released, Adele is waiting for him at the prison gate, and they embrace. As the couple walk together down a dirt track on a farm, Henry says in a voiceover that he spent half of his life worrying his mother would be unable to go out into the world on her own, but as it turned out, she would not have to.

== Cast ==
- Kate Winslet as Adele
- Josh Brolin as Frank
  - Tom Lipinski as Young Frank
- Gattlin Griffith as Henry
  - Tobey Maguire as Adult Henry (the narrator)
  - Dylan Minnette as High School Henry
- Clark Gregg as Gerald
- Brooke Smith as Evelyn
- James Van Der Beek as Officer Treadwell
- J. K. Simmons as Mr. Jervis
- Maika Monroe as Mandy
- Alexie Gilmore as Marjorie
- Brighid Fleming as Eleanor
- Lucas Hedges as Richard
- Micah Fowler as Barry
- Elena Kampouris as Young Rachel McCann
- Marceline Hugot as Mrs. Farnsworth
- Marva Hicks as Morning Anchor

== Production ==
=== Development ===
In September 2009, it was announced that Reitman was working on a screenplay, based on Joyce Maynard's novel. Talking about the story, Reitman said that "I read it, and I saw the movie in my head. It challenged me in a way that I liked. It was different from everything else I’ve read." He also admitted that it was completely different from his previous work and said that "[it] deals with a very complex drama. And I may not nail it on this film, it may just be my first step." Reitman wanted to make the film right after his 2009 film Up in the Air, but due to Winslet's scheduling conflicts, he chose to direct Young Adult first.

=== Casting ===
Reitman had Kate Winslet and Josh Brolin in mind for the lead roles. In June 2011, it was revealed that Winslet and Brolin had joined the cast of the film. On casting the actors, he said, "I know what actors I want for it. I'll be able to go to them easily" and that "[Winslet] makes those characters beautiful and sexual. I don’t know another actor who does that. I don’t know what I would have done if she’d said no."

In April 2012, it was announced that James Van Der Beek had joined the cast of the film as a police officer and Gattlin Griffith as young Henry Wheeler. In June 2012, it was confirmed that Alexie Gilmore, Brighid Fleming, Lucas Hedges and Micah Fowler had joined the cast of the film. Later Tobey Maguire rounded out the cast and joined the film as adult Henry Wheeler.

=== Pre-production ===
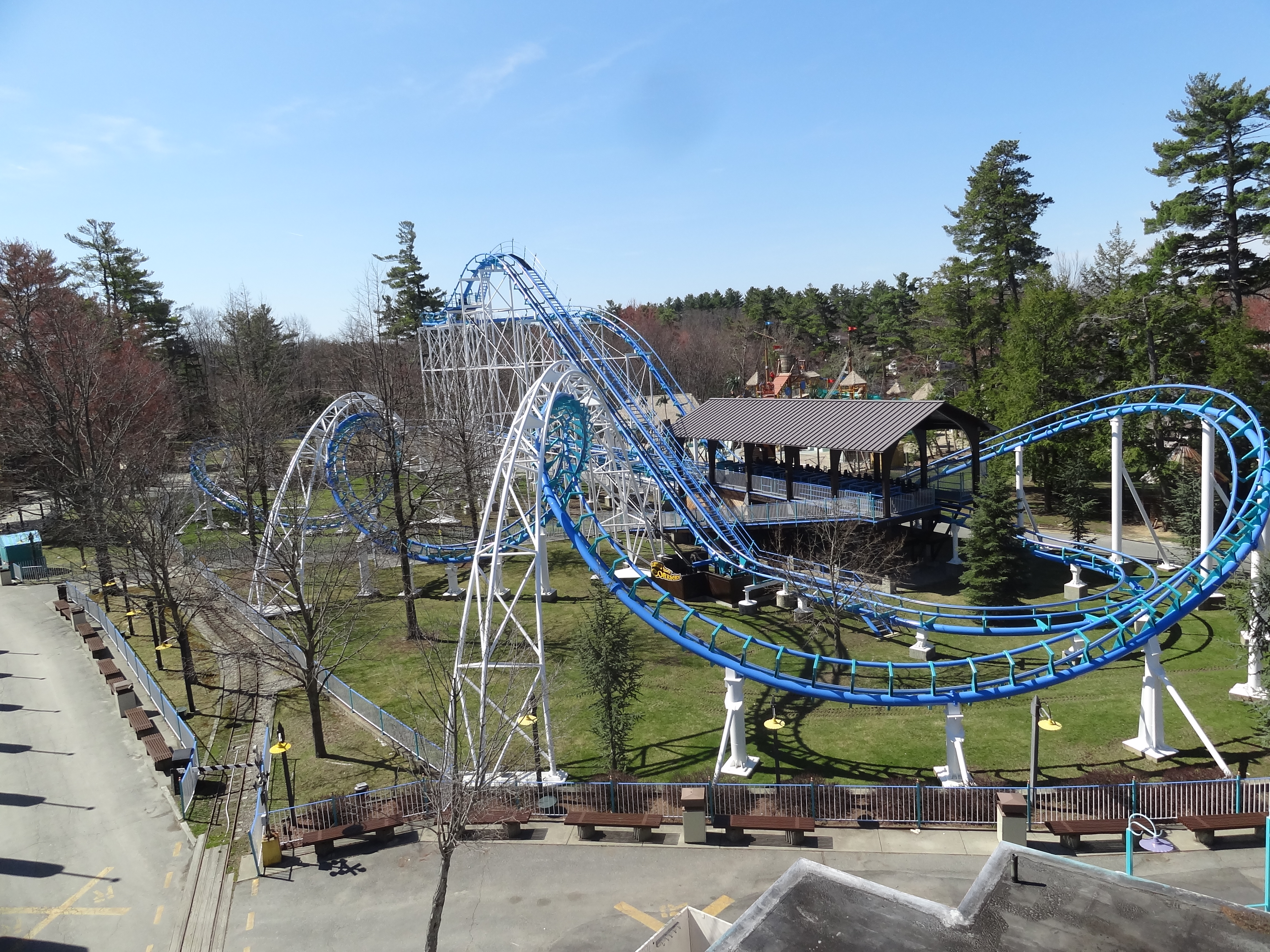
Filming took place at Canobie Lake Park.

Production began for the film on June 5, 2012. Reitman and the film's art director Steve Saklad searched a number of houses in Massachusetts as most of the film is set inside the Wheelers' home. According to Reitman, "We searched the entire state of Massachusetts for that house. My location manager has never looked at that many locations looking for one place. For weeks we would just drive down the street, knocking on people’s doors. The house we found was perfect but it was very modern. Steve brought it back to 1987."

=== Filming ===
Principal photography for the film began on June 13, 2012, in Massachusetts. The filming locations included Acton, Belchertown, Shelburne Falls, Ashland, Sutton, Mansfield, Maynard, Natick, Medfield, and Medway, Massachusetts. Filming moved to Acton and scenes shot around Piper Road and at a house located in the area. The movie was also filmed at Canobie Lake Park in Salem, New Hampshire. Filming finished on 17 August 2012.

== Music ==
The soundtrack was composed by Rolfe Kent who previously composed music for Reitman's Thank You for Smoking (2005), Up in the Air (2009) and Young Adult (2011). The album features I'm Going Home from Arlo Guthrie and Here Before from Vashti Bunyan. It also contains guitar pieces by Andrés Segovia and Shin-Ichi Fukuda. Talking about the music, Kent said that "You know it’s simple to compose happy or sad music, but to create something simple yet sophisticated, that calls the listener to be curious and yet uncertain and perhaps a little unnerved, well it called me to forget everything I knew about composition and discover a whole new musical language. It was at once incredibly stressful, and deeply rewarding." The soundtrack album features three songs. "Wings" from Birdy and "Take Us Alive" from Other Lives were featured in the trailers of the movie.

Film Music Magazine's Daniel Schweiger praised the soundtrack as "most impactful insights to the human condition, while completely surprising with its cinematic, and musical authorships." Kaya Savas of Film Music Media gave the album four and a half star out of five and said that "There is beauty, sadness and uneasiness all tackled with a wonderfully calculated approach."

== Promotion ==
The first image of Winslet, Brolin, and Griffith was released on July 23, 2013, along with the announcement of film being selected to premiere at the Toronto International Film Festival. After its premiere at TIFF, the official poster for the film was revealed on 20 September 2013. The first official trailer of the film was released on October 31, 2013, followed by a second trailer release in November 2013.

Paramount partnered with the American Pie Council (APC) in promoting the film, and the APC produced materials promoting both the film and National Pie Day (January 23, eight days before the film's general American release).

== Release ==
The film had its world premiere at the Telluride Film Festival on August 29, 2013 and later screened in the Special Presentations section at the 2013 Toronto International Film Festival. The film had a limited release on December 27, 2013, for a one-week awards-qualifying run and had a wide release on January 31, 2014, in the United States.

=== Home media ===
The film was released on DVD + Blu-ray in the US on April 29, 2014. Bonus features include deleted scenes, a "End of Summer: making-of" Labor Day segment, and commentary featuring Reitman, cinematographer Steelberg, and first assistant director/co-producer Jason Blumenfeld.

== Reception ==
=== Box office ===
The film was opened wide along with That Awkward Moment on Super Bowl weekend. It grossed an estimated $5.3 million in its first three days and ranked seventh on its opening weekend, in domestic box office rankings by Rentrak. The film grossed $13.3 million in the U.S. and $6.9 million in the rest of the world, resulting in a worldwide gross of $20.2 million.

=== Critical response ===
According to the aggregate review site Rotten Tomatoes, the film holds a 34% approval rating based on 200 reviews, with an average rating of 5.2/10. The website's critical consensus states: "Kate Winslet and Josh Brolin make for an undeniably compelling pair, but they can't quite rescue Labor Day from the pallid melodrama of its exceedingly ill-advised plot." On Metacritic, the film holds an average score of 52 out of 100, based on 43 reviews from mainstream critics, which indicates "mixed or average" reviews. Audiences polled by CinemaScore gave the film an average grade of "B−" on an A+ to F scale.

Todd McCarthy of The Hollywood Reporter, in his review said that "the film emits frequent pangs of emotion and tension, which enable it to prevail over threats from the cliches and inevitabilities of the story's format. There is more than one instance when events will cause many viewers' hearts to leap, as they say, into their throats, and the wrap-up is quietly satisfying." Peter Debruge of Variety stated that Labor Day brims with such carefully observed details, all of them a little too elegant to feel entirely genuine, and yet impossible to fault" and that Winslet "communicates Adele's fragility in a matter of a few short scenes." Mark Kermode of the BBC gave the film a positive review and praised Winslet's performance.

Negative reviews critiqued the film's sentimentality and implausibilities of its plot. Writing for RogerEbert.com, Christy Lemire said the film is permeated with "a lack of tonal self-awareness" as it swings from scenes of genuine tension to sentimentality. She concluded, "Actors of the caliber of Brolin and Winslet can do nothing but the best with what they're given, struggling to find nuance and humanity in romance-novel archetypes." Others expressed disappointment in Reitman's pivot from the acerbic wit of his previous films Thank You for Smoking, Juno, Up in the Air, and Young Adult.

== Accolades ==
Year	Award	Category	Recipient(s)	Result	Ref.
2014	Golden Globe Awards	Best Actress in a Motion Picture – Drama	Kate Winslet	Nominated	
2014	Society of Camera Operators	Camera Operator of the Year – Feature Film	P. Scott Sakamoto	Nominated	
2014	Chicago International Film Festival	Audience Choice Award	Jason Reitman	Nominated	
2014	Golden Trailer Awards	Golden Trailer - Best Romance	Paramount Pictures; Acme Trailer Company	Nominated	
2014	Hollywood Post Alliance	Outstanding Color Grading - Feature Film	Natasha Leonnet; Modern VideoFilm	Nominated	
