= Mrs. March =

Mrs. March may refer to:

- Mrs. March (novel), a novel by Spanish author Virginia Feito
- Virginia Gabriel, author known also as Mrs. George E. March
- Miss March, a 2009 comedy film by Trevor Moore and Zach Cregger
- March (novel), a 2005 novel by Geraldine Brooks
