= Virginia Feito =

Spanish writer (born 1988)

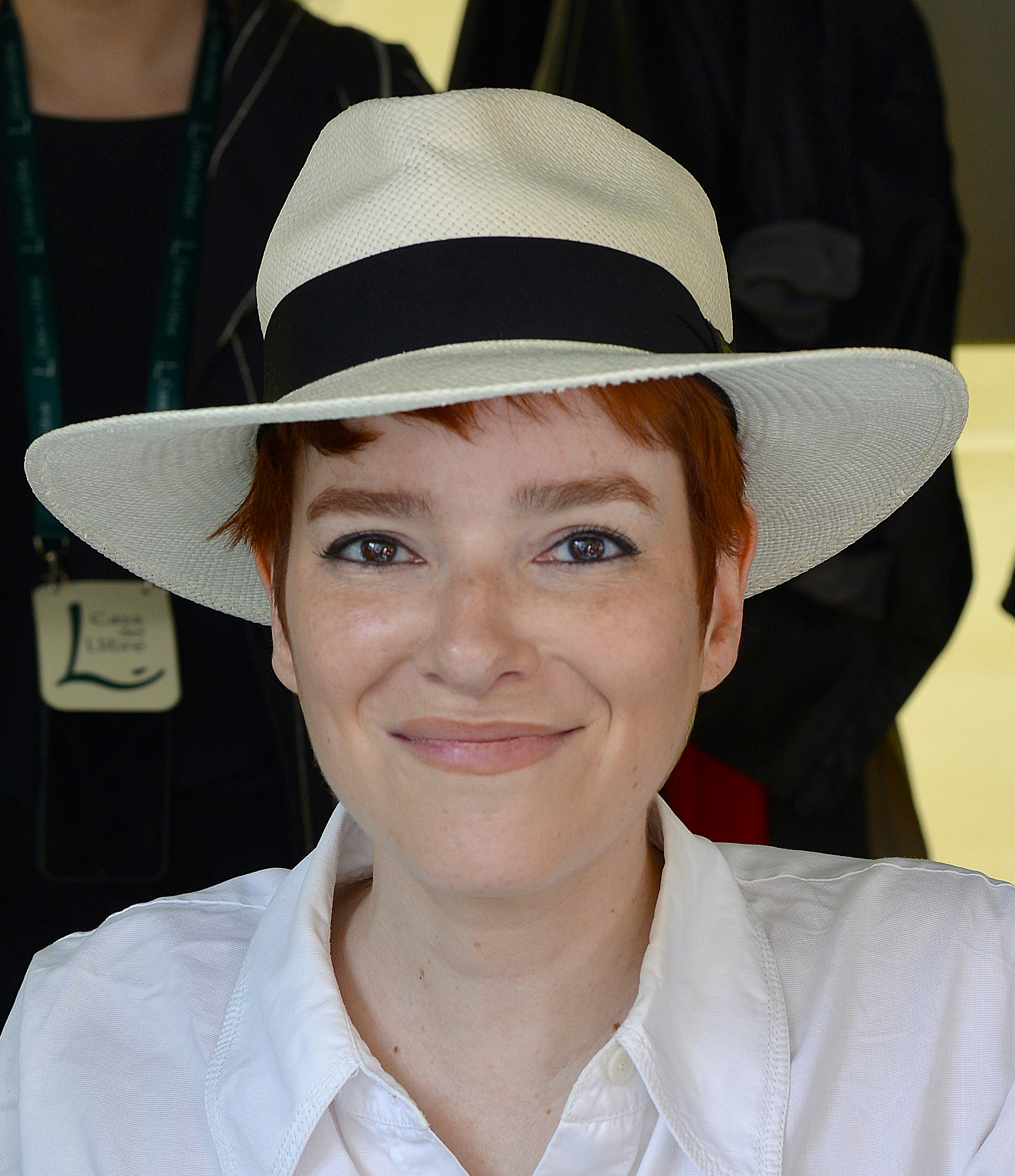
- Feito in 2025
- Born: 1988 (age 37–38); Madrid, Spain
- Education: Queen Mary University of London
- Years active: 2021–present
- Website: www.virginiafeito.com

Virginia Feito (born 1988) is a Spanish novelist who writes in English. Her debut novel, Mrs. March (2021), received a number of accolades, including a Valencia Negra Award. Her second novel, Victorian Psycho, followed in 2025.

== Early life ==
Feito was born and primarily grew up in Madrid, with a four-year stint in Paris. She attended a British school in the former and an American school in the latter. She said she "clung" to English during her time in Paris, as she had a better grasp of it than she did of French. She was also interested in English literature from a young age, particularly The Secret Garden, Roald Dahl, the Brontë sisters and Charles Dickens. Feito graduated with a Bachelor of Arts (BA) in English and Drama from Queen Mary, University of London.

== Career ==
Feito began her career as a copywriter. Her debut novel Mrs March was published in 2021. In 2022, The Times named Mrs March one of the best books of the year. Mrs March won the Best Novel València Negra Award and El Corte Inglés Un Any de Llibres Award for Best Debut. It was also shortlisted for the Goldsboro Books Glass Bell Award.

Inspired by 19th-century mysteries and gothic literature, Feito's second novel, Victorian Psycho, was published in 2025.

She is a regular contributor and columnist for Vanity Fair Spain.

== Adaptations ==
As of 2020, a film adaptation of Mrs March starring Elisabeth Moss was in development.

Zachary Wigon is set to direct a feature film adaptation of Victorian Psycho for A24. Margaret Qualley was attached to star in the film alongside Thomasin McKenzie. In 2025, Qualley exited the production and was replaced by Maika Monroe.

== Bibliography ==
- Mrs. March (2021)
- Victorian Psycho (2025)
