= 100 Nights of Hero =

2025 film by Julia Jackman

- Theatrical release poster
- Directed by: Julia Jackman
- Screenplay by: Julia Jackman
- Based on: The One Hundred Nights of Hero by Isabel Greenberg
- Produced by: Helen Simmons; Stephanie Aspin; Grant S. Johnson
- Starring: Emma Corrin; Nicholas Galitzine; Maika Monroe; Amir El-Masry; Charli XCX; Richard E. Grant; Felicity Jones
- Cinematography: Xenia Patricia
- Edited by: Amélie Labrèche
- Music by: Oliver Coates
- Production companies: Erebus Pictures; Project Infinity
- Distributed by: Independent Film Company (United States); Vue Lumière (United Kingdom)
- Release dates: 6 September 2025 (Venice); 5 December 2025 (United States); 6 February 2026 (United Kingdom)
- Running time: 91 minutes
- Countries: United Kingdom; United States
- Language: English
- Budget: $5.3 million
- Box office: $496,004

100 Nights of Hero is a 2025 fantasy romance film written and directed by Julia Jackman, based on the graphic novel The One Hundred Nights of Hero by Isabel Greenberg, which itself was based on the Middle Eastern folktale One Thousand and One Nights. It stars Emma Corrin, Nicholas Galitzine, Maika Monroe, Amir El-Masry, Charli XCX, Richard E. Grant and Felicity Jones. It follows a woman (Monroe) whose neglectful husband (El-Masry) leaves her alone for a hundred days to test her fidelity, as she and her loyal maid (Corrin) are tested by the arrival of her husband's seductive friend (Galitzine).

The film had its world premiere in the Settimana Internazionale della Critica section of the 82nd Venice International Film Festival on 6 September 2025, and was the Closing Night film of the 2025 BFI London Film Festival. It was released in the United States on 5 December 2025 by Independent Film Company and in the United Kingdom and Ireland on 6 February 2026 by Vue Lumière.

== Plot ==
A god named Kiddo creates the world as a peaceful garden and leaves it to its inhabitants. Her father, Birdman, intervenes, imposing order and establishing rules that govern society, including strict expectations surrounding marriage and gender. Under these laws, Agnes enters into a marriage and becomes pregnant with a daughter, Hero.

Twenty-seven years later, Cherry lives in an unconsummated marriage with her husband, Jerome. Although under pressure from his family to produce an heir, Jerome avoids consummating the marriage, and Cherry is given one hundred days to become pregnant or face death. Jerome confides in his acquaintance Manfred, who claims he can test Cherry's loyalty by attempting to seduce her. The two men agree to a deal: Manfred is given one hundred nights to win Cherry's affection. If he succeeds, he will gain Jerome's estate; if he fails, he must father a child and present it as Jerome's heir. Jerome leaves the castle under the pretense of business, leaving Cherry with Manfred, a group of guards, and her maid, Hero.

Manfred attempts to seduce Cherry, but she avoids him. Cherry and Hero establish a secret code where the latter will tell stories whenever Cherry wishes to leave Manfred's presence. Hero begins recounting the story of three sisters, Mina, Caterina, and Rosa, whose father prepares them for marriage after their mother's death. The sisters secretly practice reading and writing, which is forbidden to women. Rosa eventually marries, but her writing is discovered by her husband, who accuses her of wrongdoing. The sisters are arrested and sentenced to death, and they choose to jump from a cliff rather than submit. Their father recovers their bodies and discovers their hidden writings. He records their story, which spreads widely.

As the days pass, Cherry becomes increasingly anxious about the approaching deadline to become pregnant and Jerome's absence. Manfred continues his attempts to seduce Cherry, and tension builds between him and Hero. Cherry learns that Jerome does not intend to return soon and, craving intimacy, kisses Hero. When Cherry discovers that Hero can read and write, conflict arises between them. Cherry agrees to conceive a child with Manfred in order to fulfill the requirement imposed on her. At that moment, Jerome returns, revealing that the one hundred nights have ended. He declares Manfred the winner of the wager and orders that Cherry be confined until charges can be brought against her. Manfred objects and declares that he intends to remain with Cherry.

Hero intervenes, claiming responsibility for influencing Cherry through forbidden stories. Cherry declares her love for Hero and states that the stories have changed her understanding of her life. Jerome responds by accusing Hero of witchcraft and calls for her punishment. Hero explains to Cherry that her mother, Agnes, had participated in a group dedicated to preserving stories through tapestries. A member named Wilmot later entered the castle as a maid and hid stories throughout the building. Hero came to the castle as a maid to recover these stories after Wilmot's death, but remained after finding them and continued writing herself.

Cherry and Hero are put on trial for witchcraft and perversion and are sentenced to death. The guards of the castle, having discovered Hero's hidden writings, share them with others, leading to growing public support. A crowd gathers during the execution. When given the opportunity to confess wrongdoing in exchange for mercy, both Cherry and Hero refuse. They instead choose to jump from the execution site. Their actions lead to the spread of storytelling among women. Cherry and Hero survive through supernatural intervention and are transformed into constellations, becoming known as the Heroes.

== Cast ==
- Emma Corrin as Hero
- Nicholas Galitzine as Manfred
- Maika Monroe as Cherry
- Amir El-Masry as Jerome
- Charli XCX as Rosa
- Richard E. Grant as Birdman
- Felicity Jones as Moon / Narrator
- Safia Oakley-Green as Kiddo
- Josh Cowdery as Beaked Brother Hugo
- Markella Kavenagh as Mrs. A (Agnes)
- Cory Peterson as Mrs. A's Husband
- Clare Perkins as Wilmot
- Christopher Fairbank as Beaked Brother Charles
- Bijan Daneshmand as Jerome's Father
- Zara Hadeshian as Jerome's Mother
- Felix Uff as Clarence
- Jordan Wallace as Guard John
- Michael Keogh as Guard David
- Jordan Coulson as Guard Sam
- Olivia D'Lima as Caterina
- Kerena Jagpal as Mina
- Jeff Mirza as Sea Captain
- Tom Stourton as Merchant
- Varada Sethu as Esa
- Zaris-Angel Hator as Lisa
- Bella Law as Elle, David's Daughter
- Douglas Russell as The Executioner
- Brian Francis as a Peasant

== Production ==
In September 2024, it was announced that an adaptation of the graphic novel The One Hundred Nights of Hero by Isabel Greenberg was in development, with Julia Jackman writing and directing, and Nicholas Galitzine, Emma Corrin, Maika Monroe, and Charli XCX joining the cast. In November, it was revealed that Richard E. Grant, Amir El-Masry and Felicity Jones had joined the cast. Xenia Patricia serves as the cinematographer, Amélie Labrèche and Oona Flaherty edited the film, and Oliver Coates composed the score.

=== Filming ===
Principal photography began on 27 September 2024 and wrapped on 29 October.

== Release ==
100 Nights of Hero had its world premiere at the 82nd Venice International Film Festival at the Settimana Internazionale della Critica section on 6 September 2025. In May 2025, Independent Film Company acquired the film's North American rights. The film was released in the United States on 5 December 2025. In September 2025, it was announced as the Closing Night film of the 69th BFI London Film Festival. In October 2025, Vue Lumière acquired the film's UK & Irish rights.

== Reception ==
On the review aggregator website Rotten Tomatoes, 68% of 73 critics' reviews are positive. The website consensus reads: "100 Nights of Hero is an uneven, whimsical fairy tale whose sumptuous visuals, playful performances and inventive moments are often undermined by a thin, surface-level narrative. Metacritic, which uses a weighted average, assigned the film a score of 64 out of 100, based on 22 critics, indicating "generally favorable" reviews.

=== Accolades ===
Award	Date of ceremony	Category	Recipient(s)	Result	Ref.
British Independent Film Awards	30 November 2025	Best Costume Design	PC Williams	Nominated	
British Independent Film Awards	30 November 2025	Best Make-Up & Hair Design	Kehinde Are, Feyzo Oyebisi	Nominated	
British Independent Film Awards	30 November 2025	Best Production Design	Jennifer Anti, Pablo Anti	Nominated	
