= Body (2015 American film) =

- Theatrical release poster
- Directed by: Dan Berk; Robert Olsen
- Written by: Dan Berk; Robert Olsen
- Produced by: Dan Berk; Robert Olsen; Chadd Harbord; Bryan Gaynor; Michael W. Gray
- Starring: Helen Rogers; Alexandra Turshen; Lauren Molina; Larry Fessenden
- Cinematography: Matt Mitchell
- Edited by: Bryan Gaynor
- Music by: Luke Allen
- Production companies: Last Pictures; Smiley Ball Films
- Distributed by: Oscilloscope Laboratories
- Release dates: January 25, 2015 (SFF); December 11, 2015 (United States; limited)
- Running time: 75 minutes
- Country: United States
- Language: English
- Box office: $2,634

Body is a 2015 American thriller film written and directed by Dan Berk and Robert Olsen in their directorial debut. It stars Helen Rogers, Alexandra Turshen, Lauren Molina, and Larry Fessenden. During a wild night of partying, three women realize that they have gotten into more trouble than they expected. Body premiered on January 25, 2015, at the Slamdance Film Festival.

== Plot ==
Three college-age girls, Holly, Cali, and Mel, become bored when they return home for the holidays. Cali convinces the others that they should go to her uncle's house, where they can party. Mel and Holly are hesitant at first, but ultimately agree to go with Cali.

As the girls drive to the house, Holly calls her boyfriend, Ben, and invites him to join them. Cali is annoyed by the suggestion, noting that she had intended a "girl's night out." The girls finally get to the house and have a good time, but this falls apart when Holly finds photographs showing that Cali is unrelated to the owners. Holly confronts Cali, who admits that the house does not belong to her uncle, but to a friend and that they are not technically supposed to be there. Holly and Mel insist that they leave, but before they can, Arthur, the groundskeeper, arrives and surprises them. Thinking that the girls are thieves, Arthur tries to apprehend them but falls down the stairs and appears to die. The girls panic and decide to fabricate a story to convince the police: Arthur entered the house and attacked Holly, but fell down the stairs in the process and broke his neck. They then take steps to falsify evidence: Cali tears out a lock of Holly's hair and Holly scratches herself with Arthur's fingernails. While falsifying evidence, Holly finds out that Arthur is not actually dead but is actually paralyzed from the neck down. Cali suggests that he will die soon and recommends that they wait for a while to ensure that he is really dead.

Holly's boyfriend, Ben, eventually arrives at the house and tries to enter, still thinking that it belongs to Holly's uncle. The girls drag Arthur into a living room, and Cali answers the door and accuses Ben of cheating, hoping that he will leave. Ben forces his way into the house and confronts Holly, nearly discovering Arthur. Meanwhile, Arthur uses his teeth to pull off a tablecloth, causing a tray holding glasses to fall to the ground and shatter. However, Ben does not hear the noise and leaves without discovering the girls' plot. Cali, enraged by Arthur's actions, decides that Arthur will not die anytime soon and declares that they will have to kill him themselves. Holly and Mel are resistant to Cali's idea and insist that they will turn themselves into the police instead. Cali appears to agree and leaves, stating that she needs to find her phone so that she can call the police. After she leaves, Holly and Mel discover that Cali had left the phone in the same room and deduce that she had instead gone to kill Arthur.

Holly and Mel rush to the living room, only to discover that Cali has already smothered Arthur with a pillow and that he is finally dead. Holly attacks Cali, but Cali easily overpowers her and ties her up. Mel and Cali leave the room, and Cali proposes killing Holly and pinning the crime on Arthur. Mel agrees, but before they can kill Holly, they discover that she has cut herself loose using a piece of broken glass. Holly and Cali fight for a while, but Holly gains the upper hand and bludgeons Cali to death with a table leg.

Holly and Mel weigh their options and decide that it is best to stick with their original story but add that Arthur had first killed Cali before falling to his death. The film concludes with a scene of police officers photographing the scene of the crime and comforting Holly and Mel, whose story they apparently believe.

== Cast ==
- Helen Rogers as Holly
- Alexandra Turshen as Cali
- Lauren Molina as Mel
- Adam Cornelius as Ben
- Larry Fessenden as Arthur

== Production ==
The film was written to take advantage of the filmmakers' available resources. The conception was always a genre film, but the story went through many permutations before Berk and Olsen were satisfied. The role of Holly was written for Rogers, with whom the writer-directors had worked previously. Molina was recommended by one of the producers, and Turshen was cast after extensive auditions. Influences included Shallow Grave, The Shining, Funny Games, and Wolf Creek. Shooting took place during March 2014 in Westport, Connecticut. The characters represent Sigmund Freud's model of the id, ego, and superego. They were designed to show the various ways someone could react to the dilemmas in the film.

== Response ==
=== Critical reception ===
On review aggregator website Rotten Tomatoes, the film holds an approval rating of 42% based on 19 reviews, and an average rating of 6/10. On Metacritic, the film has a weighted average score of 49 out of 100, based on 8 critics, indicating "mixed or average" reviews.

Dennis Harvey of Variety wrote that the film fails to rise above its unoriginal premise. Justin Lowe of The Hollywood Reporter described it as "an occasionally involving low-budget thriller that’s too often less than thrilling". Patrick Cooper of Bloody Disgusting rated it 3.5/5 stars and wrote, "Morbidly entertaining and emotionally honest, Body is one helluva debut for Dan Berk and Robert Olsen." Jess Hicks, also writing for Bloody Disgusting, rated it 3/5 stars and wrote that too much time was given to character development that needed better writing. Kevin Jagernauth of IndieWire rated it B− and wrote that the film "succeeds on its own very modest terms" due to its focus on characterization.
