= The Encyclopedia of Early Earth =

Graphic novel by Isabel Greenberg

The Encyclopedia of Early Earth is a graphic novel by Isabel Greenberg.

== Background ==
Greenberg wrote a short story called "Love in a Very Cold Climate" that won the 2011 Graphic Short Story Prize. The Encyclopedia of Early Earth is an expansion of the story introduced in the short story. The story draws heavily from the Hebrew Bible, Greek mythology, Norse mythology, and Arabian Nights. The art style resembles Epileptic by David Beauchard as well as German Expressionist woodcuts. The artwork also resembles the Bayeux Tapestry and Inuit art. The plot of the story follows a Nord man and a woman from the South pole who fall in love. However, a magnetic field prevents the two from coming within a couple feet of each other. The book was published in 2013.

== Reception ==
The Globe and Mail compared the book's art style to Persepolis and the narrative to Ursula K. Le Guin's Earthsea. George Pendle praised the books illustrations saying that the style compliments the subject, however, he criticized the book for lacking "structural cohesion". Kirkus Reviews called the book "A beautiful, promising work that doesn't quite coalesce." Library Journal praised the book saying it has "striking illustrations" and a "stunning denouement". Common Sense Media gave the book 5 out of 5 stars for ages 10 and up. Cory Doctorow recommended the book saying that it is "unpretentious and straightforward, but also complex, meaty, and ultimately very satisfying." Joe Dell'Erba wrote in the Washington Independent Review of Books that the book is "entertaining, moving, and an utter pleasure to read." Noah Cruickshank gave a mixed review in The A.V. Club, saying that the main story arc is a trope and "never has enough time to breathe" but that the ending is still impactful and the artwork is memorable.

=== Awards ===
Award	Date	Category	Result	Ref.
Booklist Editors' Choice	2013	Fiction	Included	
Eisner Awards	2014	Best Graphic Album—New	Nominated	
Cartoonist Studio Prize	2014	Best Graphic Novel	Shortlisted	
