= Dan Berk and Robert Olsen =

American filmmaking duo

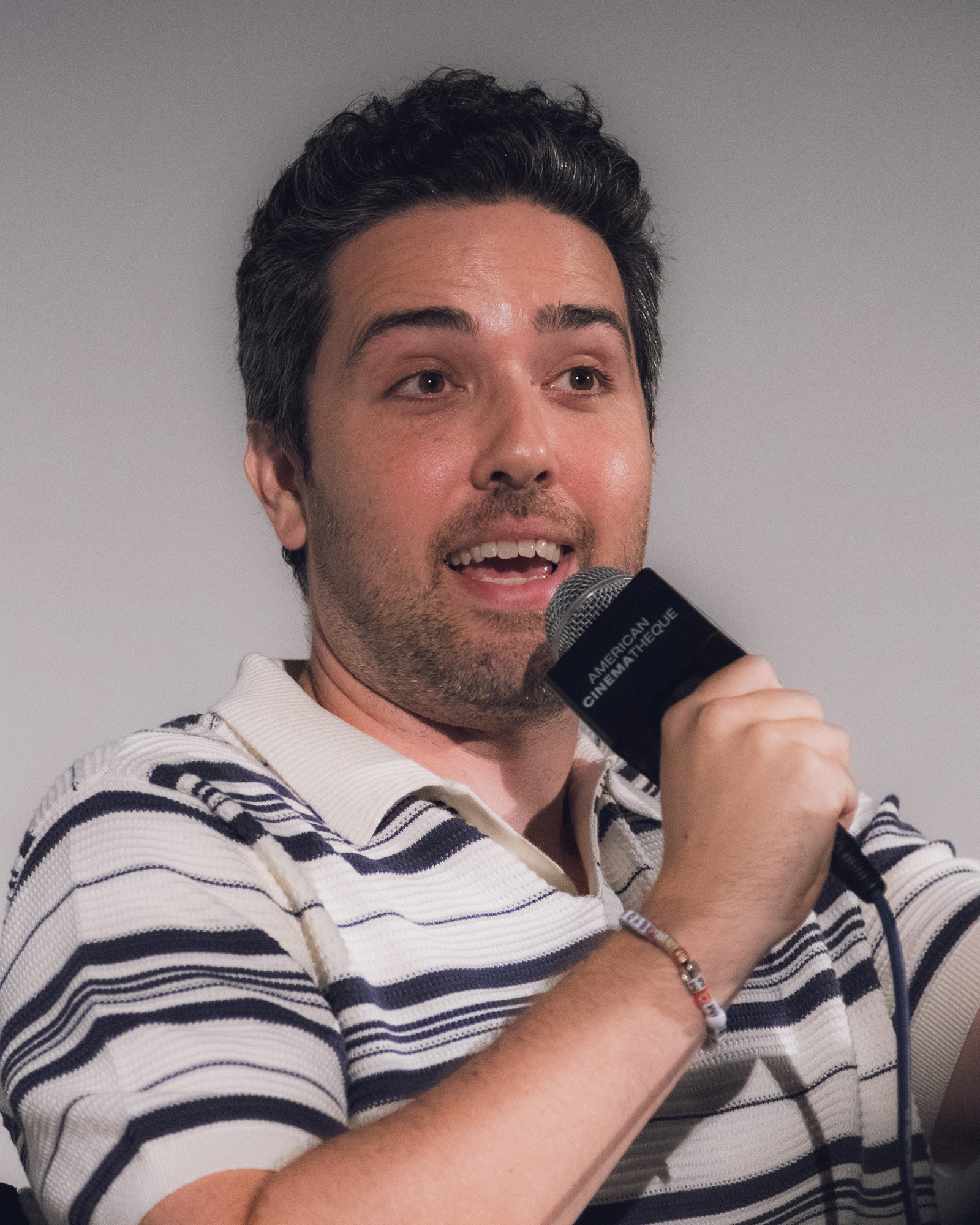
Dan Berk in 2025

Dan Berk and Robert Olsen are American filmmakers. Films they directed include Body (2015), Stake Land II (2016), Villains (2019), Significant Other (2022) and Novocaine (2025).

The two first met as randomly assigned roommates in freshman year at New York University.

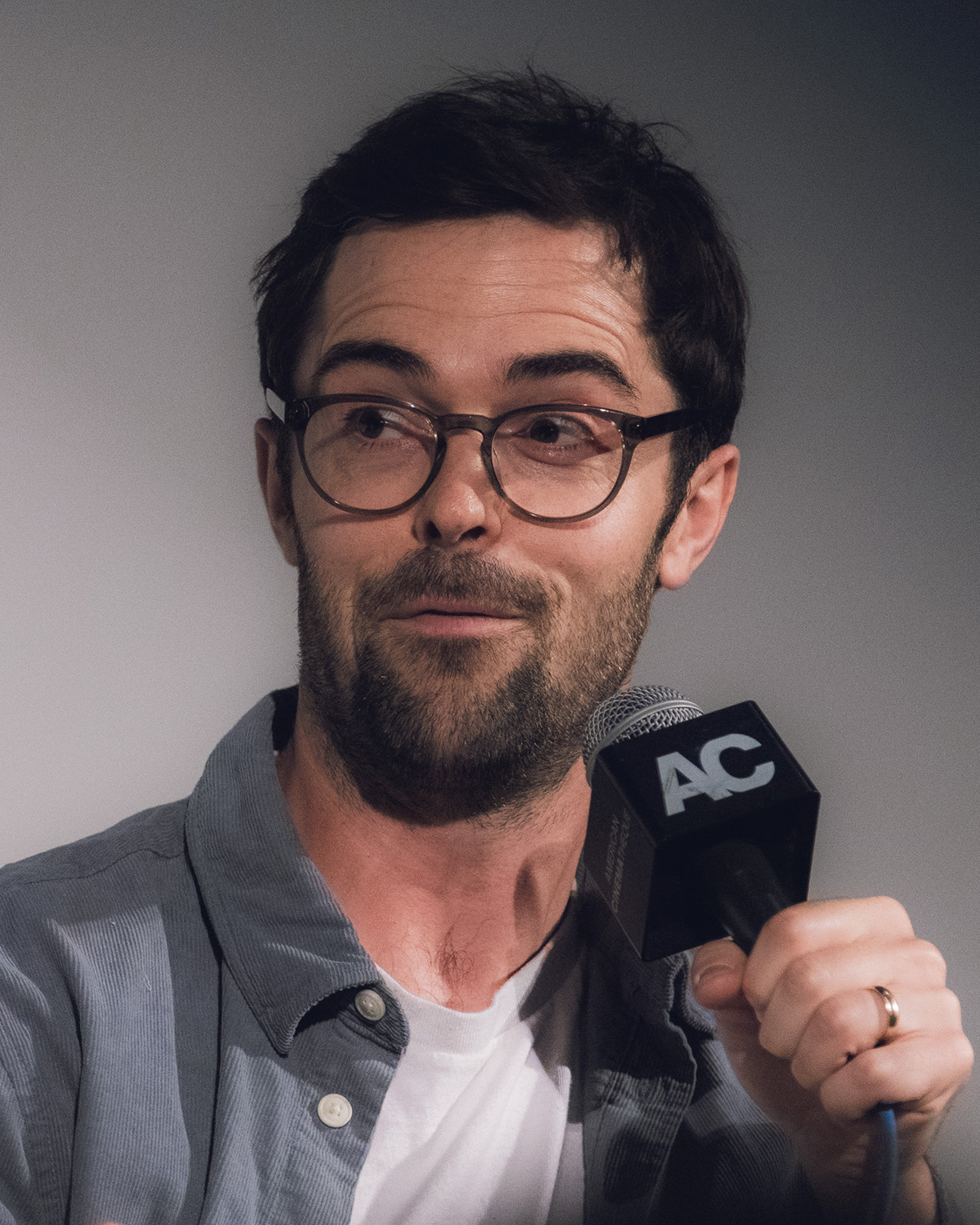
Robert Olsen in 2025

== Filmography ==
Film

Year	Title	Director	Writer	Producer	Notes
2015	Body	Yes	Yes	Yes	
2016	Stake Land II	Yes	No	No	Also editors
2019	Villains	Yes	Yes	Yes	
2022	Significant Other	Yes	Yes	Executive	
2025	Novocaine	Yes	Uncredited	No	Additional literary material
