= Maika Monroe =

American actress (born 1993)

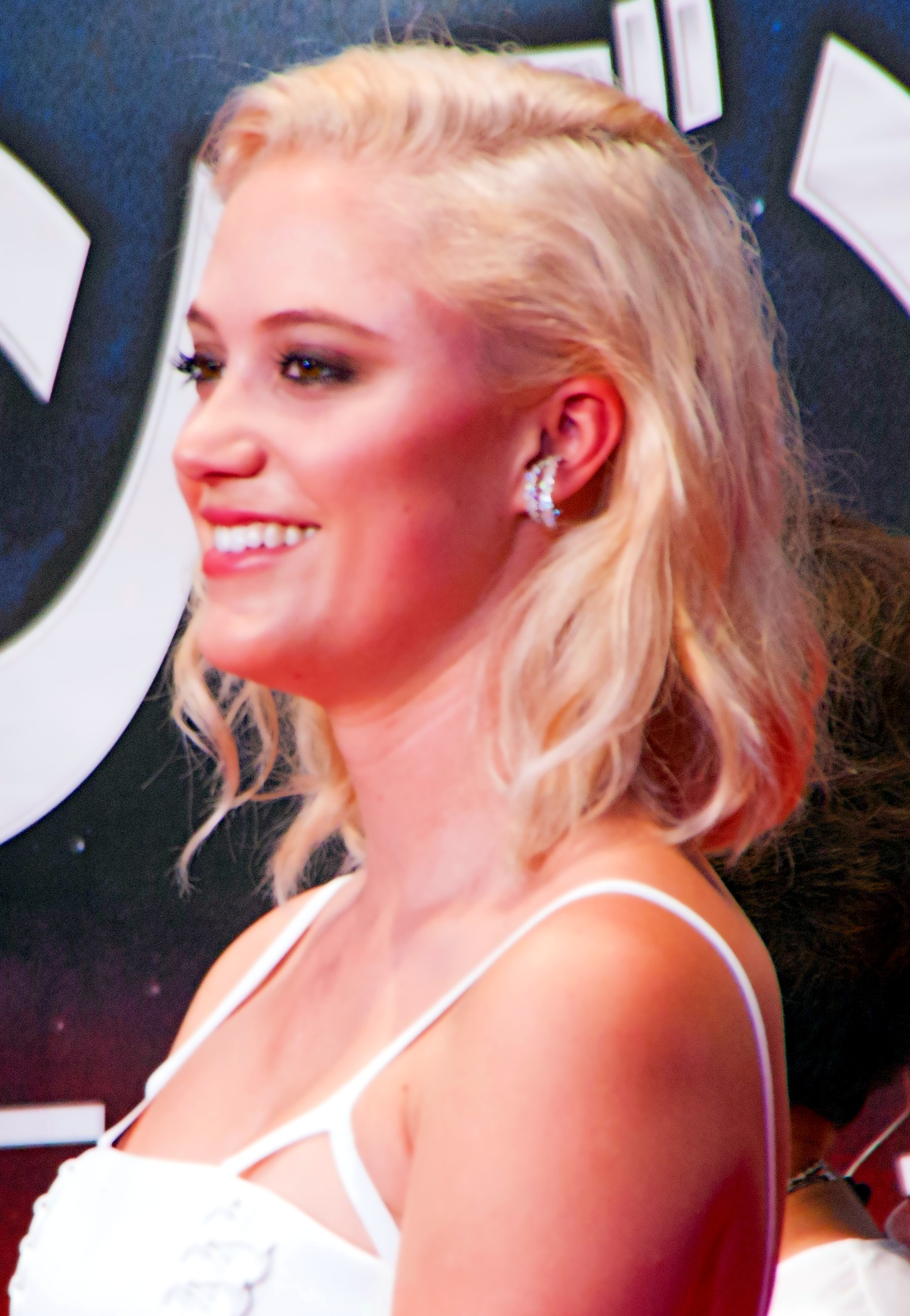
- Monroe in 2016
- Born: Dillon Monroe Buckley; May 29, 1993 (age 33); Santa Barbara, California, U.S.
- Occupation: Actress
- Years active: 2009–present

Maika Monroe (born Dillon Monroe Buckley; May 29, 1993) is an American actress. She had her breakthrough role in the indie horror It Follows (2014). She has featured in several other horror films, such as The Guest (2014), Villains (2019), Longlegs (2024) and Victorian Psycho (2026).

She also starred in the thrillers Greta (2018) and Watcher (2022). Aside from her horror and thriller roles Monroe appears in the action film Independence Day: Resurgence (2016), the neo-noir Hot Summer Nights (2017) and the action film God Is a Bullet (2023).

== Early life and education ==
Maika Monroe was born Dillon Monroe Buckley on May 29, 1993, in Santa Barbara, California. Her mother was a sign language interpreter, and her father worked in construction. She later changed her first name to Maika, by which she had already been known for most of her life.

At age 17, Monroe left Santa Barbara and moved to Cabarete, Dominican Republic, to continue training in kiteboarding after spending the previous summer there. She completed her senior year of high school online.

== Career ==
=== Acting ===
Monroe made her acting debut with a small role on Eleventh Hour, a drama series. Three years later, she made her film debut in the 2012 drama At Any Price, playing Cadence Farrow. She relocated to Los Angeles for the film, and credits the part for encouraging her to continue acting.

In 2013, she played a minor character in Sofia Coppola's crime film The Bling Ring. She next appeared in the drama film Labor Day as Mandy, a farm girl who romances with a young man and eventually becomes his wife and the mother of his child. It is an adaptation of the novel of the same name, and it was released that same year.

In 2014, Monroe achieved a career breakthrough with two films. She played Anna Peterson in the psychological thriller film The Guest, and headlined the horror film It Follows as Jamie "Jay" Height. The latter premiered at the 67th Cannes Film Festival and established Monroe as a scream queen. Writing for Entertainment Weekly, Chris Nashawaty said the film was "airtight" because of "Monroe’s moody teenage authenticity". Both films garnered a cult following while It Follows ranks among the best horror films of the 2010s.

In 2015, Monroe appeared in the Western film Echoes of War. In 2016, she starred in the invasion thriller film The 5th Wave, based on the novel of the same name. Also that year, Monroe starred in the science fiction film Independence Day: Resurgence, the sequel to Independence Day (1996), playing former First Daughter Patricia Whitmore.

In 2017, Monroe starred alongside Timothée Chalamet in the neo-noir coming-of-age film Hot Summer Nights as his girlfriend McKayla. In 2019, Monroe played Sandra in drama film Honey Boy. In 2020, Monroe portrayed Cindy Williams in the Canadian mystery thriller Flashback.

In 2022, Monroe played Julia in Watcher, the psychological thriller feature directorial debut of Chloe Okuno. In 2023, Monroe played Case in the film God Is a Bullet, an adaption of the 1999 novel of the same name.

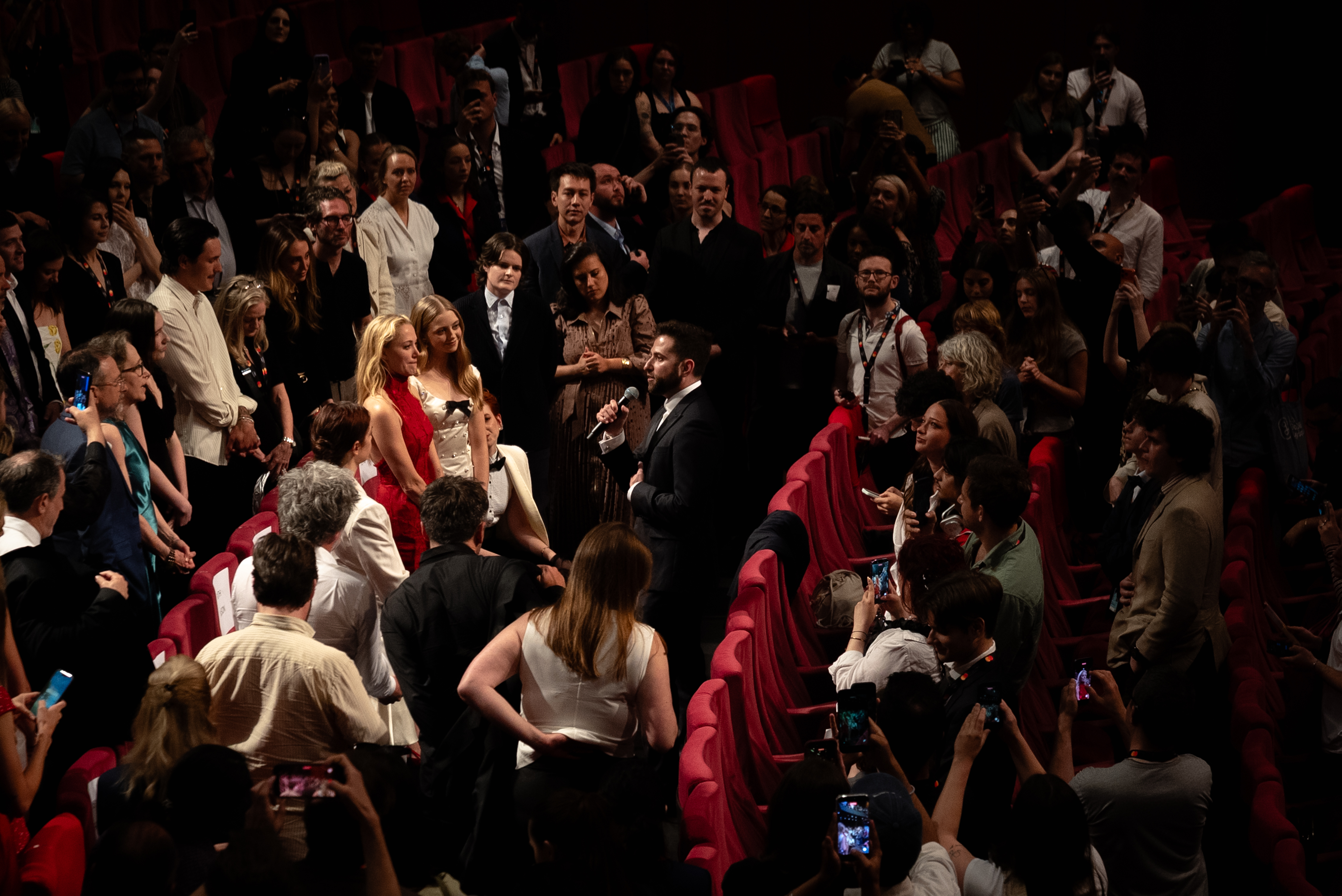
Monroe during the standing ovation for Victorian Psycho at the 2026 Cannes Film Festival.

Monroe was cast as Lee Harker in the horror film Longlegs alongside Nicolas Cage. Monroe said the role was "incredibly impactful for me. It also felt unique, and it was something I had never done. Lee is so incredibly different from who I am and how I move through life." On working with Cage, she said that "He's the best. He's such a genuine human." The film was released in 2024 and became the highest grossing independent feature of that year.

Monroe was confirmed to star in a sequel to It Follows titled They Follow, which will be distributed by Neon.

In 2025, Monroe starred in the historical fantasy romance film, 100 Nights of Hero, directed by Julia Jackman, distributed by A24. The same year, she starred as Ava Bly in In Cold Light (2025).

In February 2026, she starred in Evil Has Always Had a Name, a live-action trailer and short film directed by Rich Lee and Franciska Friede to promote the video game Resident Evil Requiem.

In March 2026, she starred in the film adaptation of Colleen Hoover's Reminders of Him.

=== Other ===
Monroe is also a professional kiteboarder, as of 2015.

== Personal life ==
Monroe was in a relationship with actor Joe Keery from 2017 to 2022.

== Filmography ==
=== Film ===
Key
| † | Denotes films that have not yet been released |

| Year | Title | Role | Notes | Ref. |
|---|---|---|---|---|
| 2012 | At Any Price | Cadence Farrow | | |
| 2013 | The Bling Ring | Beach Girl | | |
| 2013 | Labor Day | Mandy Chambers | | |
| 2014 | The Guest | Anna Peterson | | |
| 2014 | It Follows | Jamie "Jay" Height | | |
| 2015 | Echoes of War | Abigail Riley | | |
| 2015 | Burned | Lila | Short film | |
| 2016 | The 5th Wave | Ringer | | |
| 2016 | Independence Day: Resurgence | Patricia Whitmore | | |
| 2017 | Hot Summer Nights | McKayla Strawberry | | |
| 2017 | The Scent of Rain and Lightning | Jody Linder | | |
| 2017 | Bokeh | Jenai | | |
| 2017 | Mark Felt: The Man Who Brought Down the White House | Joan Felt | | |
| 2017 | I'm Not Here | Karen | | |
| 2017 | The Tribes of Palos Verdes | Medina Mason | | |
| 2018 | After Everything | Mia | | |
| 2018 | Tau | Julia | Also executive producer | |
| 2018 | Greta | Erica Penn | | |
| 2019 | Honey Boy | Sandra | | |
| 2019 | Villains | Jules | | |
| 2019 | How To Be Alone | Lucy | Short film | |
| 2020 | Brothers by Blood | Grace | | |
| 2020 | Flashback | Cindy Williams | | |
| 2022 | Watcher | Julia | | |
| 2022 | Significant Other | Ruth Miller | Also executive producer | |
| 2023 | God Is a Bullet | Case Hardin | | |
| 2024 | Longlegs | Agent Lee Harker | | |
| 2025 | In Cold Light | Ava Bly | | |
| 2025 | 100 Nights of Hero | Cherry | | |
| 2025 | The Hand That Rocks the Cradle | Polly Murphy / Rebecca | | |
| 2026 | Reminders of Him | Kenna Rowan | | |
| 2026 | Victorian Psycho | Winifred Notty | | |
| 2026 | Place to Be | Heidi | | |
| TBA | Vegas: A Love Story † | Dillon | Post-production | |
| TBA | They Follow † | Jaime "Jay" Height | Post-production | |

=== Television ===
| Year | Title | Role | Notes | Refs. |
|---|---|---|---|---|
| 2009 | Eleventh Hour | Maya Wynne | Episode: "Medea" | |
| 2013 | Flying Monkeys | Joan | Television film | |
| 2020 | The Stranger | Clare | Main role (14 episodes) | |
| 2020 | JJ Villard's Fairy Tales | Snow White (voice) | Episode: "Snow White" | |

=== Music videos ===
| Year | Artist | Song Title | Role | Refs. |
|---|---|---|---|---|
| 2012 | Butch Walker and the Black Widows | Synthesizers | 70s Girl 1 | |

== Awards and nominations ==
| Year | Award | Category | Work | Result | Refs. |
|---|---|---|---|---|---|
| 2015 | Home Media Magazine Awards | Best Scream Queen | It Follows | Won | |
| 2015 | Hamptons International Film Festival | Breakthrough Performer | It Follows | Won | |
| 2015 | Fright Meter Awards | Best Actress In A Leading Role | It Follows | Nominated | |
| 2016 | iHorror Awards | Best Female Performance In A Horror Film | It Follows | Nominated | |
| 2016 | Empire Awards | Best Female Newcomer | It Follows | Nominated | |
| 2016 | Fangoria Chainsaw Awards | Best Actress | It Follows | Won | |
| 2016 | CinemaCon Awards | Best Ensemble of the Universe | Independence Day: Resurgence | Won | |
| 2016 | FilmQuest Awards | Best Supporting Actress – Short | Burned | Nominated | |
| 2016 | Portsmouth International Film Festival | Best Supporting Performance in a Short | Burned | Nominated | |
| 2017 | Hell's Half Mile Film & Music Festival | Best Lead Actress | The Scent of Rain and Lightning | Won | |
| 2023 | Fangoria Chainsaw Awards | Best Actress | Watcher | Nominated | |
| 2025 | Fangoria Chainsaw Awards | Best Lead Performance | Longlegs | Nominated | |
