= Tau (film) =

2018 science fiction film by Federico D'Alessandro

- Directed by: Federico D'Alessandro
- Written by: Noga Landau
- Produced by: Russell Ackerman; Terry Dougas; David S. Goyer; Paris Kasidokostas Latsis; John Schoenfelder; Kevin Turen
- Starring: Maika Monroe; Ed Skrein; Gary Oldman
- Cinematography: Larry Smith
- Edited by: Scott Chestnut
- Music by: Bear McCreary
- Production companies: Waypoint Entertainment; Rhea Films; Hercules Film Fund; Phantom Four Films; Addictive Pictures; Kaos Theory Entertainment; Netflix
- Distributed by: Netflix
- Release date: June 28, 2018
- Running time: 97 minutes
- Countries: United States; Serbia; Czech Republic; Canada
- Language: English

Tau is a 2018 science fiction thriller film directed by Federico D'Alessandro from a screenplay by Noga Landau. A multinational collaborative project between the United States, Canada, Serbia, and the Czech Republic, the film stars Maika Monroe, Ed Skrein, and the voice of Gary Oldman in the main roles, and was released on June 28, 2018, by Netflix, to generally negative reviews.

== Plot ==
Julia is a young woman who steals at seedy nightclubs. She is abducted from her home and awakens in a jail cell with a glowing implant in the back of her neck. Two other subjects are with her. After multiple sessions of psychological torture by a man named Alex, she destroys the cell and adjacent lab in an escape attempt. The two other subjects are killed by a robot, Aries, run by an artificial intelligence (AI) named Tau. Aries is about to kill Julia when Alex arrives and stops the robot.

Alex reveals that the implant is collecting Julia's neural activity for an AI project. Destroying the lab has set back his research. In the face of a two-week deadline, Alex keeps Julia a prisoner in his house and insists that she complete puzzles and cognitive tests. While Alex is away at work each day, Julia converses with Tau about the world outside the house. It is clear that, although intelligent in some ways, Tau is ignorant of how people feel or the world at large. While Tau begins to understand the harm in Julia's situation, his programming prevents him from releasing her. In exchange for information about the outside world, Tau gradually reveals more information about the house as well as Alex's experiments.

Julia secretly accesses Alex's tablet computer and discovers that ten subjects have died in his experiments. Alex later discovers her fingerprint on the tablet and assumes that Tau has slipped in his duties, so he punishes Tau by erasing its code and memories, delivering a form of pain to the AI. Julia notices that Tau's monitoring of her shuts down during his punishment, so when undetected, she hides a steak knife. When Alex returns later that night from a charity benefit, Julia begins to seduce him while he is sitting at the kitchen table, then slashes him. As the two struggle, Tau threatens Alex with pain if he does not stop hurting Julia. Alex forces Aries to hit Julia repeatedly and then tells both Tau and Julia that whatever was going on is over. While repairing Tau, he disconnects a drone from the network.

The next day, Julia convinces Tau that Alex will kill her if she does not escape. Tau bypasses his prohibition in releasing her by opening an air duct in the atrium. As she escapes, Alex arrives, sees Julia missing, and begins punishing Tau. Julia returns to save Tau, but it is too late—all of his memories of her have been erased.

Alex has Julia strapped down in the basement to extract her implant, a procedure that will kill her. The disconnected drone, still containing Tau's former consciousness and memories, helps Julia break free from her restraints. She knocks Alex unconscious and cuts off his hand with a bone saw to use on the house's biometric sensors. Aries sees her in the atrium and chases her upstairs to Alex's bedroom. As the robot breaks through the door, she uses Alex's severed hand to activate the house's self-destruct mechanism. Alex emerges, still alive, but is crushed by falling masonry as the house destroys itself. Julia narrowly escapes through a cracking wall with the drone that saved her—all that remains of Tau.

== Cast ==
- Maika Monroe as Julia / Subject Three
- Ed Skrein as Alex
- Gary Oldman as the voice of Tau
- Fiston Barek as Subject Two
- Ivana Zivković as Subject One
- Sharon D. Clarke as Queenpin
- Ian Virgo as Party Boy

== Production ==
In May 2016, it was announced that Maika Monroe and Ed Skrein had joined the cast of the film, with Federico D'Alessandro directing the film, with David S. Goyer, Kevin Turen, Russell Ackerman, and John Schoenfelder producing the film, while Ken Kao, Dan Kao, and Luc Etienne will executive produce the film, under their Addictive Pictures, Phantom 4, and Waypoint Entertainment banners, respectively. In August 2016, it was announced that Rhea Films and Hercules Film Fund would produce the film.

== Reception ==
=== Release ===
In November 2017, Netflix acquired distribution rights outside China to the film. It was released on June 28, 2018.

=== Critical reception ===
On review aggregator website Rotten Tomatoes, the film holds an approval rating of 27% based on 11 critics reviews with an average rating of 4.9/10. On Metacritic, which assigns a weighted average rating to reviews, the film has a score of 43 out of 100, based on 5 critics, indicating "mixed reviews".

== See also ==
- List of Netflix original films (2015–2019)
