= Bonus Track (film) =

2023 film by Julia Jackman

- Release poster
- Directed by: Julia Jackman
- Screenplay by: Michael Gilbert
- Story by: Michael Gilbert; Josh O'Connor
- Produced by: Stephanie Aspin; Campbell Beaton; Helen Simmons
- Starring: Joe Anders; Samuel Small; Susan Wokoma; Josh O'Connor; Ray Panthaki; Alison Sudol
- Cinematography: Jonas Mortensen
- Edited by: Jason Rayton
- Music by: Chris Hyson
- Production companies: Erebus Pictures; Screen Yorkshire; Lunapark Pictures; Quickfire Films; Fortune Films
- Distributed by: Sky Cinema
- Release dates: 5 October 2023 (BFI); 1 June 2024 (United Kingdom)
- Running time: 99 minutes
- Country: United Kingdom
- Language: English

Bonus Track is a 2023 British coming-of-age romantic comedy film directed by Julia Jackman, in her feature directorial debut. It is based on an original story by Josh O'Connor, who also appears in the film, and Michael Gilbert, who wrote the screenplay.

The film had its world premiere at the BFI London Film Festival on 5 October 2023. It was released in the United Kingdom on Sky Cinema on 1 June 2024.

== Premise ==
In 2006, George Bobbin, a 16-year-old who lives in a small English town and dreams of becoming a pop star, meets Max, the son of a famous musical duo.

== Cast ==
- Joe Anders as George Bobbin
- Samuel Small as Max
- Jack Davenport as Jeffrey, George's father
- Alison Sudol as Julia, George's mother
- Susan Wokoma
- Ray Panthaki as Mr Zeppelin
- Josh O'Connor
- Nina Wadia
- Ellie Kendrick
- Josh Cowdery

== Production ==
Filming was underway in York on 17 August 2022, when the film was announced. The school featured is All Saints Catholic School, in York.

== Release ==
Bonus Track was selected to screen for potential buyers in the Industry Selects section of the Toronto International Film Festival in September 2023. It had its world premiere at the BFI London Film Festival on 5 October 2023.

Sky pre-bought the United Kingdom and Germany distribution rights. The film was released in the UK on Sky Cinema on 1 June 2024. In July 2024, Sunrise Films acquired US distribution rights to the film. It was released in select cinemas in the United States on 11 October 2024.

== Reception ==
On the review aggregator website Rotten Tomatoes, 86% of 14 critics' reviews are positive, with an average rating of 6.2/10.

Nikki Baughan of Screen Daily found the film laden with teenage romantic comedy clichés, and the 2006 setting "not entirely realistic", but wrote that "two charming lead performances, and a largely positive depiction of adolescent homosexuality ... should chime with its intended teen audience". Peter Bradshaw of The Guardian found the film "sweet-natured and engagingly laid-back, if a bit televisual and reliant on that time-honoured staple that dates from Richard Curtis's Love Actually", giving it three out of five stars.
