= Joyce Maynard =

American writer (born 1953)

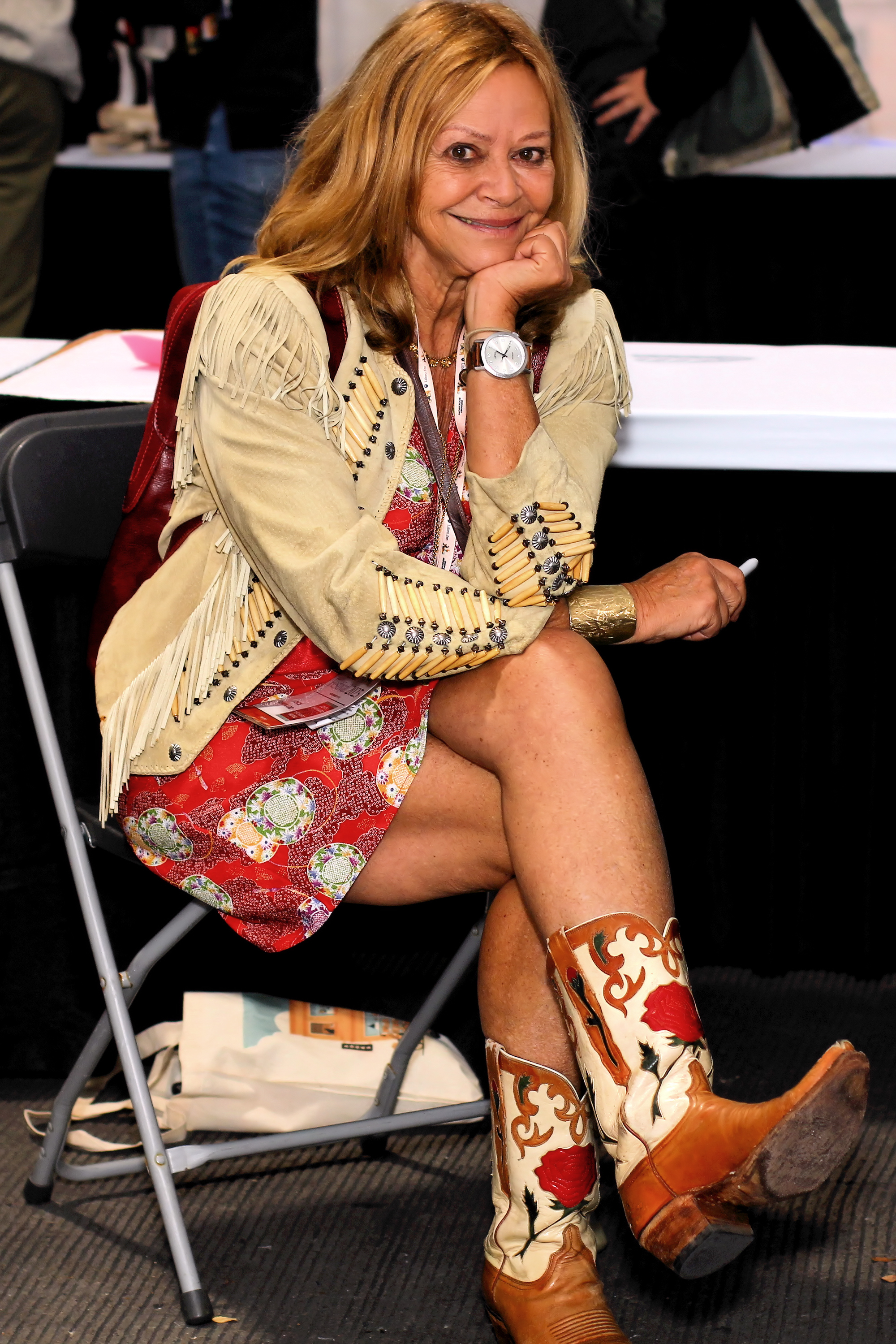
- Maynard at the 2023 Texas Book Festival
- Born: November 5, 1953 (age 72); Durham, New Hampshire, U.S.
- Occupations: Novelist; memoirist; journalist
- Spouses: Steve Bethel (m. 1977; div. 1989) Jim Barringer (m. 2013; died 2016)
- Children: 3; including Wilson
- Writing career
- Years active: 1972–present
- Period: 1981–present
- Genres: Fiction, memoir, true crime, young adult
- Notable works: To Die For, At Home in the World
- Website: joycemaynard.com

Joyce Maynard (born November 5, 1953) is an American novelist and journalist. She began her career in journalism in the 1970s, writing for several publications, most notably Seventeen magazine and The New York Times. Maynard contributed to Mademoiselle and Harrowsmith magazines in the 1980s, while also beginning a career as a novelist with the publication of her first novel, Baby Love (1981). Her second novel, To Die For (1992), drew on the Pamela Smart murder case and was adapted by Gus Van Sant into the film To Die For in 1995. Maynard received significant media attention in 1998 with the publication of her memoir At Home in the World, in which she describes her relationship with J. D. Salinger.

Maynard has published novels in a wide range of literary genres, including fiction, young adult fiction, and true crime. Her sixth novel, Labor Day (2009), was adapted into the 2013 film Labor Day, directed by Jason Reitman. Her recent novels include Under the Influence (2016), Count the Ways (2021), The Bird Hotel (2023), and How the Light Gets In (2024).

== Early life ==
Maynard was born in Durham, New Hampshire, to Fredelle (née Bruser), a journalist, writer, and English teacher, and Max Maynard, a painter and professor of English at the University of New Hampshire (and brother of theologian Theodore Maynard). Her father was born in India to English missionary parents and later moved to Canada; her mother was born in Saskatchewan to Jewish immigrants from Russia. Maynard has an older sister, Rona.

Maynard attended the Oyster River school district and Phillips Exeter Academy. She won Scholastic Art and Writing Awards in 1966, 1967, 1968, 1970, and 1971. In her teens, she wrote regularly for Seventeen magazine. She entered Yale University in 1971 and sent a collection of her writings to the editors of The New York Times Magazine. They asked her to write an article about growing up in the 1960s, which was published under the title "An 18-Year-Old Looks Back on Life" in the magazine's April 23, 1972, issue. After the article was published, Maynard received a letter from fiction writer J. D. Salinger, then 53 years old, who complimented her writing and warned her of the dangers of publicity.

== Relationship with Salinger and At Home in the World ==
In spring 1972, Maynard and Salinger exchanged letters during her freshman year at Yale. By July, Maynard had given up her summer job writing for The New York Times to move in with Salinger in Cornish, New Hampshire. Salinger and his wife had divorced in 1967. By September 1972, Maynard had given up her scholarship to Yale and dropped out. While living with Salinger for eight months, until March 1973, Maynard wrote her first book, the memoir Looking Back: A Chronicle of Growing Up Old in the Sixties, which was published in 1973, soon after Maynard and Salinger ended their relationship.

Maynard withheld information about their relationship until her 1998 memoir At Home in the World. The memoir, an account of her entire life up to that point, is best known for its in-depth retelling of her relationship with Salinger, whom she portrays as a predator. At its publication, many reviewers furiously panned the book, such as Jonathan Yardley, who called it "indescribably stupid" in The Washington Post.

During the same year, she auctioned the letters Salinger had written her. Software developer Peter Norton bought them for $156,500 ($309,134 in 2025) and returned them to Salinger.

In 2021, Maynard wrote about the relationship in Vanity Fair in connection with the TV series Allen v. Farrow: "I was groomed to be the sexual partner of a narcissist who nearly derailed my life". She went into detail about the other relationships with teenagers Salinger had had at the same time, adding, "When he sent me away less than a year later with words of contempt and disdain, I believed the failure was mine, and that I was no longer worthy of his love or even respect." Of the reception of her memoirs, she wrote, "I was accused of trying to sell books, to make money from my brief and inconsequential connection to a great man", adding, "one writer, Cynthia Ozick—hardly alone among celebrated authors, weighing in with her condemnation—portrayed me as a person who, in possession of no talent of my own, had attached myself to Salinger to 'suck out' his celebrity."

== Journalism ==
After moving out of Salinger's house in 1973, Maynard bought a house in Hillsborough, New Hampshire. From 1973 to 1975, she contributed commentaries to a series called Spectrum on CBS Radio. In 1975, she joined the staff of The New York Times as a general assignment reporter and feature writer. She left The New York Times in 1977 when she married Steve Bethel. They moved to New Hampshire and had three children, Audrey, Charlie, and Wilson.

From 1984 to 1990, Maynard wrote the weekly syndicated column "Domestic Affairs", dealing with marriage, parenthood, and family life. She worked as book reviewer and columnist for Mademoiselle and Harrowsmith magazine. In 1989, when Maynard's marriage ended, more than half the newspapers that ran her "Domestic Affairs" column dropped it.

In 1986, Maynard helped lead the opposition to the construction of the nation's first high-level nuclear waste dump in New Hampshire, with ground zero in Hillsborough, where she lived with her family. Maynard described this campaign in a May 1986 New York Times cover story. She wrote, "The US Department of Energy named part of New Hampshire as a candidate for the first high-level nuclear waste 'repository' (i.e., DUMP) on the planet." The government was planning to use technology never before tried and totally unproven as safe, to bury decades-worth of high-level nuclear waste in New Hampshire granite, and to create an entire highway and train system into the state to bring the extraordinarily dangerous material with a half life of a million years. Maynard and others rallied at town meetings and convoyed to Concord, and later that year, a law was passed prohibiting a nuclear waste dump in New Hampshire.

== Fiction ==
Maynard published her first novel, Baby Love, in 1981. Her 1992 novel To Die For drew from the Pamela Smart murder case and was adapted into a 1995 film, also called To Die For, directed by Gus Van Sant and starring Nicole Kidman, Matt Dillon, and Joaquin Phoenix. In the late 1990s, she wrote to her readers in an online discussion forum, The Domestic Affairs Message Board.

She published two books of young adult fiction: The Usual Rules (2003) and The Cloud Chamber (2005). Her true crime book Internal Combustion (2006) deals with the case of Nancy Seaman, a Michigan resident convicted in 2004 of killing her husband. The novel Labor Day was published in 2009 and adapted into a movie, written and directed by Jason Reitman and starring Kate Winslet and Josh Brolin. Her other novels include The Good Daughters (2010), After Her (2013), and Under the Influence (2016).

In summer 2021, Maynard published Count the Ways, a well-received novel about home, parenthood, love, and forgiveness. That autumn, she won The Grand Prix de Littérature Américaine 2021 for "Où vivaient les gens heureux" (Count the Ways), published in France in August 2021 by Philippe Rey in a translation by Florence Lévy-Paoloni.

In 2023, the 50th anniversary of Looking Back: A Chronicle of Growing Up Old in the Sixties was noted, with Maynard recording an audio version of the book. She said: "On every page, I read words written by my younger self that, if I could, I would have changed. The girl I used to be back then was naive and opinionated, frequently a prim know-it-all. In the pages of what purported to be the story of her life so far, she was also keeping a large secret. In the end though, as the days of recording came to an end, a rush of pure, tender protectiveness for that girl overtook me. I wished I could reach through the pages I was reading out loud and put my arms around that girl, tell her to be careful of her body, her gifts, her precious and breakable heart. As I finished reading the final paragraph into the microphone, I realized I was weeping."

In May 2023, Maynard's novel The Bird Hotel was published by Arcade. On August 24, 2023, Philippe Rey published it in France under the title L'hôtel des oiseaux, translated by Florence Lévy-Paoloni.

Maynard's novel How the Light Gets In, published in June 2024 by William Morrow, is a sequel. It follows the characters of Count the Ways (2021) into the current American climate.

== Personal life ==
Maynard married Steve Bethel in 1977 and divorced him in 1989. They had three children together: daughter Audrey, a social worker, and sons Charlie, a DJ/music producer known as Captain Planet, and Wilson, an actor known for Hart of Dixie, Daredevil, and All Rise. After the divorce, Maynard and her children moved to Keene, New Hampshire.

Maynard and her sister, Rona, a writer and retired editor of Chatelaine magazine, collaborated on an examination of their sisterhood. Rona Maynard's memoir My Mother's Daughter was published in 2007. On August 12, 2023, Joyce and Rona Maynard shared the stage for a premiere event, "The Maynard Sisters In Conversation", at The Toadstool Bookshop in Keene.

Maynard has written about her experience of an international adoption and disruption, and has served as an advocate and supporter for adoptive families and children experiencing challenges related to international adoption.

On July 6, 2013, she married lawyer Jim Barringer. Barringer died on June 16, 2016, of pancreatic cancer, 19 months after his diagnosis. Their relationship and his death is the subject of her 2017 memoir The Best of Us.

Maynard returned to Yale as a sophomore in 2018 to complete her undergraduate education. During the pandemic, she left Yale again, calling herself a "two-time dropout". She resides in the San Francisco Bay Area.

== Selected works ==
=== Fiction ===
- Baby Love (1981)
- To Die For (1992)
- Where Love Goes (1995)
- The Usual Rules (2003)
- The Cloud Chamber (2005)
- Labor Day (2009)
- The Good Daughters (2010)
- After Her (2013)
- Under the Influence (2016)
- Count the Ways (2021)
- The Influencers (2022)
- The Bird Hotel (2023)
- How The Light Gets In (2024)
- In Wonderland (TBA)

=== Nonfiction ===
- Looking Back: A Chronicle of Growing Up Old in the Sixties (1973)
- Domestic Affairs: Enduring the Pleasures of Motherhood and Family Life (1987)
- At Home in the World (1998)
- Internal Combustion: A Story of a Marriage and a Murder in the Motor City (2006)
- "A Good Girl Goes Bad" (2007), in Bad Girls: 26 Writers Misbehave, edited by Ellen Sussman
- "Your Friend Always" (2007), in Mr. Wrong: Real-Life Stories About the Men We Used to Love, edited by Harriet Brown
- "Someone Like Me, But Younger" (2009), in The Face in the Mirror: Writers Reflect on Their Dreams of Youth and the Reality of Age, edited by Victoria Zackheim
- "Straw into Gold" (2013), in Knitting Yarns: Writers on Knitting, edited by Ann Hood (W. W. Norton & Company)
- The Best of Us (2017)
