= Villains (film) =

2019 film by Dan Berk and Robert Olsen

- Theatrical release poster
- Directed by: Dan Berk; Robert Olsen
- Written by: Dan Berk; Robert Olsen
- Produced by: Tim White; Trevor White; Allan Mandelbaum; Garrick Dion
- Starring: Bill Skarsgård; Maika Monroe; Blake Baumgartner; Jeffrey Donovan; Kyra Sedgwick
- Cinematography: Matt Mitchell
- Edited by: Sofi Marshall
- Music by: Andrew Hewitt
- Production companies: Star Thrower Entertainment; The Realm; Bron Studios; Creative Wealth Media
- Distributed by: Gunpowder & Sky
- Release dates: March 9, 2019 (SXSW); September 20, 2019 (United States)
- Running time: 88 minutes
- Country: United States
- Language: English

Villains is a 2019 American dark comedy horror film written and directed by Dan Berk and Robert Olsen. It stars Bill Skarsgård, Maika Monroe, Blake Baumgartner, Jeffrey Donovan, and Kyra Sedgwick.

The film had its world premiere at South by Southwest on March 9, 2019. It was released in the United States on September 20, 2019, by Gunpowder & Sky.

== Plot ==
Lovers Mickey and Jules clumsily rob a gas station and take off, celebrating their last score before moving to Florida. While driving through the woods, their car runs out of gas. The couple discover a large, isolated house, with no sign of the owners. Seeing a vehicle in the garage, they break down the front door to look for a gas can. In the basement they discover a young girl, dirty and mute, chained to a column.

Returning upstairs to find a way to release the girl, the two meet the surprised homeowners George, Gloria, and their infant son Ethan. George and Gloria calmly offer money, but Jules is adamant to know why the little girl is downstairs. George explains that their "Sweetiepie" is down there for discipline. Mickey threatens them with his gun, but George convinces them to sit down and talk. George calmly tells the couple to take their vehicle and leave. Mickey rejects their offer and backs up Jules' demand to free the girl.

After George unlocks Sweetiepie's chain, Mickey tries to coax her to come forward, but she bites his hand. George knocks him unconscious, and Gloria restrains Jules. Mickey wakes up tied to a bed, where Gloria attempts to seduce him, becoming upset when she does not arouse him. The next time Gloria visits him, Mickey apologises, seduces her, convinces her to uncuff him, and then pushes her away and escapes. However, George shoots him in the leg and ties him up in the basement with Jules. Mickey uses Jules' tongue ring to pick her handcuff. However, Jules breaks her ring trying to pick Mickey's handcuff. She climbs up the laundry chute to escape the basement.

Finding Jules gone, George beats Mickey for information. Mickey tells George that Jules is waiting at their rendezvous point and will go to the police if he does not show up. George agrees to let Mickey go. Hiding in the nursery upstairs, Jules discovers "baby Ethan" is actually a porcelain doll. Overhearing Mickey and George talking downstairs, Jules misunderstands and thinks George plans to kill Mickey. Jules uses "Ethan" as leverage, and threatens to drop the doll, demanding they let Mickey go. An enraged Gloria shoots at her, causing Jules to drop the doll, shattering it.

The captives are duct-taped at the dining table while Gloria cooks a meal. George explains that Gloria has always wanted a child, but they were unable to have one. They kidnapped Sweetiepie at a young age, but it didn't work. Gloria wanted her killed, but George locked her in the basement instead. Mickey and Jules begin feeling light-headed from eating the drugged food. George explains his plan to give them a heroin overdose after they pass out. Before George and Gloria can proceed, they are distracted by a police officer investigating the gas station robbery. Jules regains consciousness, takes some cocaine from her bag and snorts it, using the high to overpower the sedatives. She wakes Mickey up the same way.

Finding the room empty and the window open, George and Gloria head outside to search for Mickey and Jules. The couple, however, are still inside the house. They grab Sweetiepie and get in George's car. George blocks their escape and fatally shoots Mickey before getting run over. George, injured but alive, attempts to strangle Jules, but Sweetiepie fatally shoots him with his own gun. Gloria cradles George, muttering he is just resting. Jules and Sweetiepie walk away and hitch a ride to Florida.

== Cast ==
- Bill Skarsgård as Mickey
- Maika Monroe as Jules
- Blake Baumgartner as Sweetiepie
- Kyra Sedgwick as Gloria
- Jeffrey Donovan as George
- Noah Robbins as Nick
- Danny Johnson as Officer Wells
- Nikolas Kontomanolis as Sam

== Production ==
Dan Berk and Robert Olsen's script for Villains was featured on the 2016 Black List, an annual list of the most-liked unproduced screenplays of that year. Development began with the casting of Bill Skarsgård and Maika Monroe in the lead roles in March 2018. Two weeks later, Kyra Sedgwick and Jeffrey Donovan joined the cast, and principal photography began that same week in New York City. On April 13, 2018, Donovan posted on Twitter that he had wrapped for Villains.

== Release ==
The film had its world premiere at South by Southwest on March 9, 2019. Shortly after, Gunpowder & Sky acquired distribution rights to the film, with the intent to release it in mid-2019. The film was released on September 20, 2019.

== Reception ==
On the review aggregator website Rotten Tomatoes, 84% of 69 critics' reviews are positive, with an average rating of 7/10. The website's consensus reads: "Led by a quartet of strong performances, Villains offers genre fans a delightfully dark thriller with a sharp comic streak." Metacritic, which uses a weighted average, assigned the film a score of 63 out of 100, based on 13 critics, indicating "generally favorable" reviews.

Writing for The Hollywood Reporter, John Defore stated that the film "has enough of its own offbeat energy not to come off as just another collection of young filmmakers' influences." Film critic Claudia Puig described it as "a fairly funny black comedy." Variety's Dennis Harvey noted "this black comedy thriller has a good cast to spark a scenario that's intriguing enough to hold attention, if not quite clever enough to be a knockout."

The New York Times' Teo Bugbee gave the film a less positive review, stating "despite some committed performances, particularly from a refreshingly natural Maika Monroe, "Villains" is a hackneyed farce rich in gimmicks and poor in substance." Keith Watson of Slant Magazine rated the film 1.5 out of 4 stars and shared a similar opinion, stating "Maika Monroe’s engaging performance serves only to highlight how feeble and unconvincing the rest of the film is." He asserts that the film suffers from a lack of stakes, as its main characters feel more like exaggerated quirks than authentic individuals, with their bizarre behaviors appearing "more like the filmmakers’ desperate attempts to get a rise out of the audience."
