= Significant Other (film) =

2022 film by Dan Berk and Robert Olsen

- Official release poster
- Directed by: Dan Berk; Robert Olsen
- Written by: Dan Berk; Robert Olsen
- Produced by: Dan Kagan
- Starring: Maika Monroe; Jake Lacy; Matthew Yang King
- Cinematography: Matt Mitchell
- Edited by: David Kashevaroff
- Music by: Oliver Coates
- Production companies: Paramount Players; Quay Street Productions
- Distributed by: Paramount+
- Release date: October 7, 2022
- Running time: 84 minutes
- Country: United States
- Language: English

Significant Other is a 2022 American science fiction horror film written and directed by Dan Berk and Robert Olsen. The film stars Maika Monroe and Jake Lacy as a couple dealing with relationship issues while backpacking in the woods in the Pacific Northwest, whose activities are interrupted by a meteor strike bringing an evil shapeshifting alien life form into the picture.

In September 2021, Paramount Players won a bidding war for the film, with Monroe and Lacy already attached to star, and Berk and Olsen to direct. The film was released on the streaming service Paramount+ on October 7, 2022.

== Plot ==
A red object falls from the sky, hitting a wooded area, and a deer in the woods is grabbed by a tentacle.

Ruth and Harry, an unmarried couple in a six-year relationship, agree to pursue Harry's interest in camping together in the woods. They hike to a scenic overlook with water in the background where Harry proposes marriage. The anxiety-prone Ruth panics and rejects him, arguing that they talked about never getting married in the past. This conversation causes some tension. Walking in the woods the next day, they come across a dead deer covered in a black substance, which Harry guesses to be the result of an illness.

Later, Ruth enters a cave and finds a blue puddle. Emerging from the cave, she tells Harry she has reconsidered and wants him to propose to her again. This time, however, when they reach the scenic overlook, she pushes him off the cliff; he falls on a rock and is apparently dead. Wandering in the woods afterwards, Ruth finds another couple who try to establish the cause of her disassociated state. An alien impostor in the guise of Harry appears and kills the couple.

It is revealed that when Ruth found the blue puddle, she also saw Harry's dead body in a cocoon in the cave, and knew he had been replaced by an imposter. The alien who has taken Harry's place finds itself unable to kill Ruth because it absorbed Harry's love for her. Love is not an emotion of which the alien has any prior knowledge, and he finds it difficult to adapt.

The alien takes Ruth to a beach and reveals his spacecraft, offering Ruth the chance to accompany him to another planet in order to escape the forthcoming invasion and destruction of Earth. Ruth stabs the alien in the chest and lures him into the water, where his blood attracts a shark, allowing Ruth to escape. The alien manages to kill the shark and pursues Ruth again, eventually rendering her unconscious and encasing her in a cocoon. The alien absorbs Ruth's personality and character, and imitates her appearance. However, it is unadjusted to the anxieties from which it now suffers as a result of this, and becomes incapacitated. The real Ruth, escaping the cocoon, overcomes the alien and smashes its head with a rock. After she flees, the alien's head is seen beginning to reform, confirming its immortality.

Ruth finds her way back to the parking area. As she drives away Ruth experiences an emotional breakdown about the experience as she hears the alien's voice taunting her through the car radio and behind her multiple alien ships descend to Earth signifying the broader alien invasion.

== Cast ==
- Maika Monroe as Ruth Miller
- Jake Lacy as Harry
- Matthew Yang King as Ray
- Dana Green as Vivian
- Loudon McCleery as Jimmy
- Teal Sherer as Dolores
- Marcella Lentz-Pope as Therapist Receptionist
- Andrew Morgado as Radio Announcer

== Production ==
In September 2021, it was announced that Paramount Players had won a bidding war for the rights to Significant Other, a science fiction thriller script by Dan Berk and Robert Olsen, who were also attached to direct. Maika Monroe and Jake Lacy were set to star, and the film was set to be released on Paramount+.

Filming took place in Oregon, including Silver Falls State Park, Nehalem, Silverton, Cornelius, Cloverdale, Estacada, Sublimity, Eagle Creek, and Sandy.

== Reception ==
On the review aggregator website Rotten Tomatoes, 71% of 31 critics' reviews are positive, with an average rating of 6.8/10. The website's consensus reads: "Some surprising touches and a generally thoughtful approach help elevate Significant Other above standard wilderness survival stories." Metacritic, which uses a weighted average, assigned the film a score of 57 out of 100, based on 6 critics, indicating "mixed or average" reviews.

The New York Times gave the film a generally positive review, calling it "a rich and eventful ride" and writing that it "does not reinvent the genre, but its narrative flourishes make for an exciting outing". The A.V. Club found it more lackluster, describing it as "far from a must-see, but there are rewards for those who stick to the end".
