= Theodore Maynard =

English poet, literary critic and historian (1890–1956)

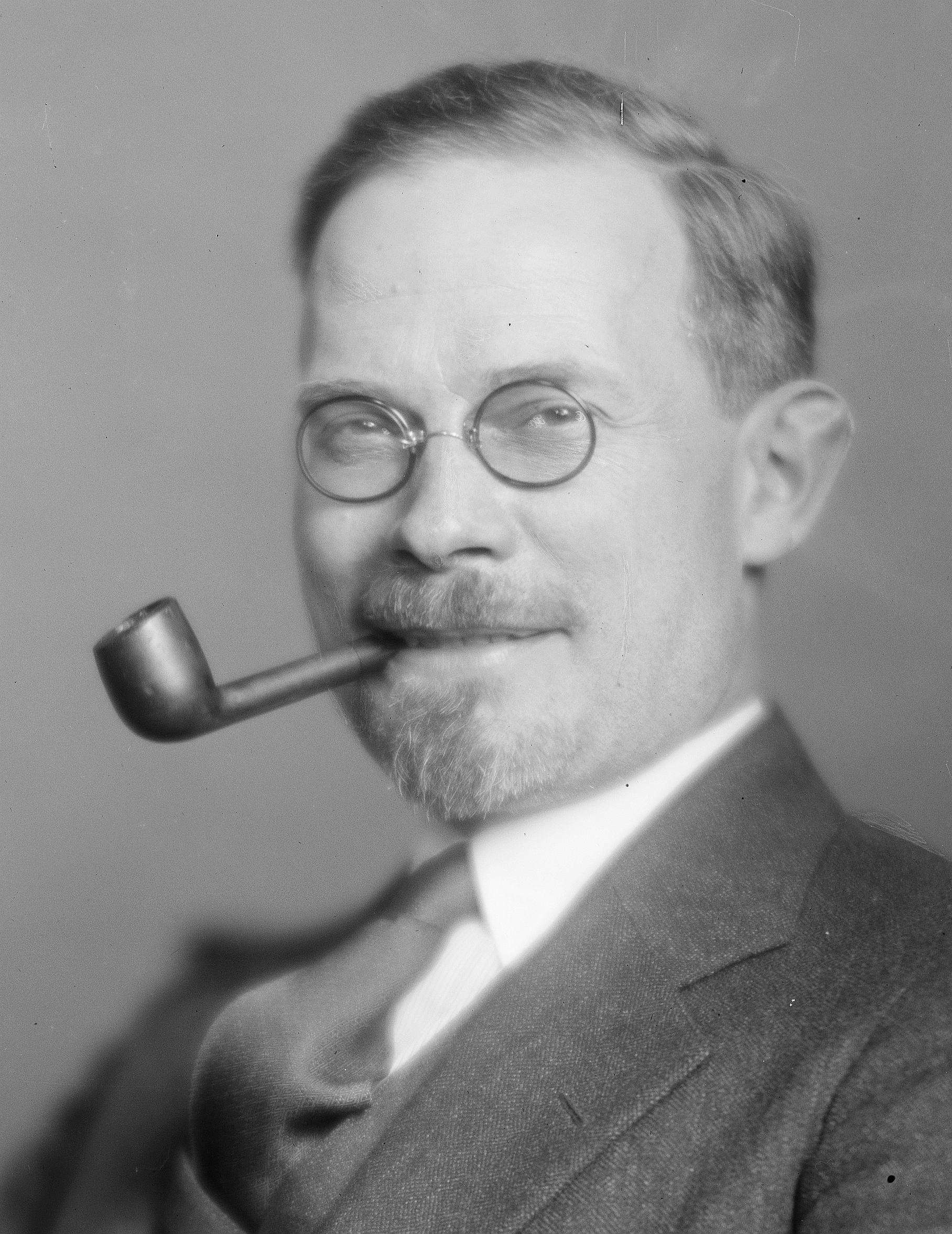
Portrait of Maynard

Theodore Maynard (1890–1956) was an English-American poet, literary critic, and historian. He grew up in England until 1920, and afterwards he moved to America and lived there until his death. Although he considered himself primarily a poet, during his lifetime he was best known and most influential as a historian of Catholicism, especially in the United States. Theodore Maynard is an uncle of writer Joyce Maynard, and great-uncle of actor Wilson Bethel.

== Published works ==
- Maynard, Theodore (1936). The Odyssey of Francis Xavier. London, New York, Toronto: Longsman, Green and co.
