= Victorian Psycho (novel) =

2025 novel by Virginia Feito

- Author: Virginia Feito
- Genre: Horror
- Publisher: Liveright
- Publication date: February 4, 2025
- Pages: 208
- ISBN: 1631498630

Victorian Psycho is a 2025 horror novel by Virginia Feito about a violent governess in 19th century England.

Feito's second novel, it was adapted into a screenplay for a movie of the same name that premiered at 2026 Cannes Film Festival.

== Plot ==
In 19th-century England, governess Winifred Notty arrives at Ensor House to take up the position of governess to the Pounds children: Drusilla and Andrew. Winifred, who barely conceals her psychopathy, is driven by revenge on Mr. Pounds, who is also her birth father. After sowing panic and violence within the house over the course of the autumn, Winifred unleashes her macabre revenge on Christmas Day.
