= Airplane movie =

Film that gains appeal for passengers on airplanes

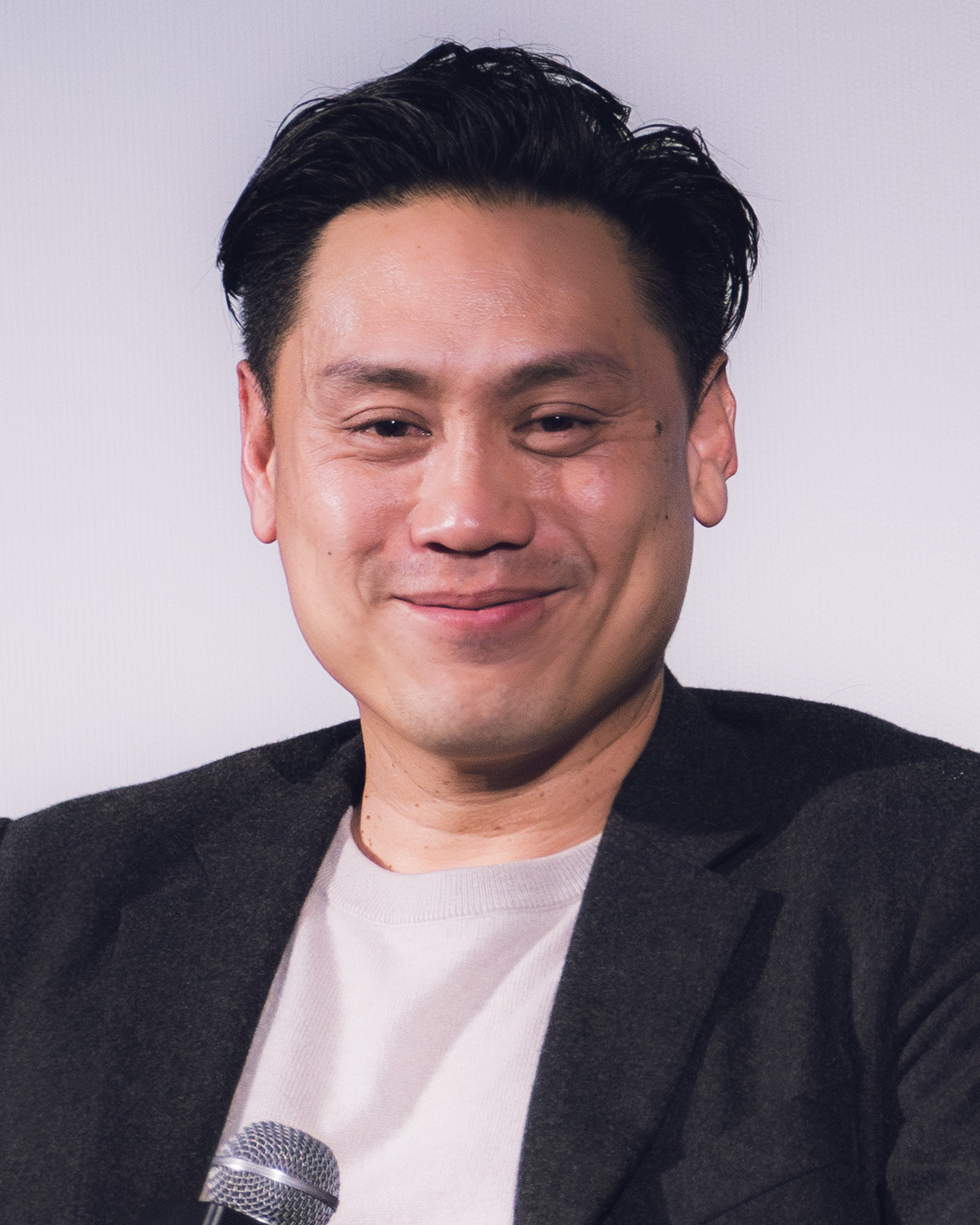
Director of Crazy Rich Asians (2018), Jon M. Chu, describes the film as a plane film.

In pop culture, an airplane movie (Note: Various other nicknames exist, which include plane film, and plane movie.) is a film that has appeal for passengers on commercial flights. Such movies are often watched by passengers on in-flight entertainment screens or personal electronics in order to cope with the length of the flight and the airplane cabin's restricted space. Examples include Crazy Rich Asians (2018) and Bend It Like Beckham (2002).

== Definition ==
The definition varies, but they are generally watched by commercial flight passengers to cope with the length of the flight before arriving at their destination. In addition, they are described as a distraction for individuals uncomfortable with the airplane's cramped cabin, with publications such as The Atlantic, GQ, and Looper labelling airplanes as "metal tubes" in relation to the viewing of airplane films. Airplane films tend to avoid the involvement of sexual content and gore to avoid disturbing other passengers. Airplane films should also avoid airplane-related disasters in the film.

== History ==
The first in-flight movie was screened by Aeromarine Airways in 1921, showing a film called Howdy Chicago! to passengers on a Felixstowe F.5 flying boat as it flew around Chicago. However, it was not until the 1960s that in-flight entertainment became popular. In 1961, David Flexer of Inflight Motion Pictures developed the 16 mm film system using a 25-inch reel for a range of commercial aircraft. Trans World Airlines then committed to Flexer's technology in the same year and was the first to debut a feature film in flight, By Love Possessed (1961).

Publications such as The Atlantic, GQ, the Los Angeles Times, and Time Magazine have made rankings for films considered as the best airplane movies.

=== Films considered airplane films ===
The film Crazy Rich Asians (2018), directed by Jon M. Chu, has been considered the best airplane movie. (Note: Attributed to Looper, Slate, and PopSugar.) In an interview with Ineye Komonibo of PopSugar, clinical psychologist Sabrina Romanoff states that passengers often turn to feel-good movies such as Crazy Rich Asians as a response to the stress felt in the limited space of an aircraft cabin. Other films considered as airplane movies include Bend It Like Beckham (2002), Catch Me If You Can (2002), and Jumanji: Welcome to the Jungle (2017).
