= Mrs. March (novel) =

2021 psychological novel by Virginia Feito

- Author: Virginia Feito
- Audio read by: Elizabeth Rodgers
- Language: English
- Publisher: Liverlight (W. W. Norton)
- Publication date: 2021
- Publication place: United States
- Media type: Print (hardcover)
- Pages: 304 pp (first edition)
- ISBN: 978-1-324-09196-7

Mrs. March is a 2021 psychological thriller, the debut novel of Virginia Feito.

== Synopsis ==
Mrs. March is the doting wife of critically acclaimed novelist George March. One day at a party an acquaintance tells her that George's latest protagonist, a disgusting, sickly, unlikeable prostitute, seems to be based on her. This causes Mrs. March's psyche to unravel into a decent of doubt, paranoia, and hallucinations. She begins to believe that her husband abducted and murdered a woman, and is determined to prove him guilty in an act of revenge.

== Reception ==
Mrs. March received largely positive reviews from critics for its well written prose, paranoia-infused tension, and interesting, if incredibly unlikable, protagonist. It has been compared to Rebecca and The Yellow Wallpaper for featuring a woman who feels like she is losing her grip on reality because of her husband.

Writing for The Guardian, Sarah Ditum called it a "tense debut, essential reading for the social media era". She classifies it as a psychological horror story about the nightmare of a "status-hungry person in a hall of mirrors".

Carol Memmott in the Washington Post mentions how the novel is an amalgam of several different genres, including "psychological suspense, mystery, crime and horror". She describes the protagonist as "detestable" and, unlike Mrs. de Winter, "readers might feel less charitable about Mrs. March" by the end.

Constance Grady's review on Vox compares it to the mid-century fiction sub-genre of "housewives going genteely mad". She praises "Feito's silver-polish sentences and her eerie psychological acumen", but criticizes how much of the book's imagery seems written with intent to make it into a screenplay.

The New York Times critic Christine Mangan also gave a positive review, citing the novel's overall sense of uneasiness coupled with a few shocks and twists.

== Film ==
Elizabeth Moss agreed to star in a movie adaptation of the novel after she was given an advance copy of the book. Blumhouse is producing the film.
