= Emma Corrin =

English actor (born 1995)

- Corrin in 2026
- Born: Emma Louise Corrin; 13 December 1995 (age 30); Royal Tunbridge Wells, Kent, England
- Education: Woldingham School; St John's College, Cambridge
- Occupation: Actor (Note: Corrin is non-binary and uses they/them pronouns. They prefer the term actor to actress.)
- Years active: 2017–present

Emma Louise Corrin (born 13 December 1995) is an English actor who has worked on stage and screen. They gained international recognition for portraying Diana, Princess of Wales, in the fourth season of the Netflix historical drama The Crown (2020), for which they won a Golden Globe and a Critics' Choice Award, and received Primetime Emmy and Actor Awards nominations. Corrin has since appeared in the romantic dramas My Policeman (2022) and Lady Chatterley's Lover (2022), the television series A Murder at the End of the World (2023), and the films Deadpool & Wolverine (2024), Nosferatu (2024), and 100 Nights of Hero (2025).

On stage, Corrin made their professional debut in Anna X (2021), earning a Laurence Olivier Award nomination, and has since received critical acclaim for performances in Orlando (2022) and The Seagull (2025).

== Early life and education ==
Emma Louise Corrin was born on 13 December 1995 in Royal Tunbridge Wells, Kent. Their father, Chris Corrin, is a businessman, and their mother, Juliette Corrin, is a speech therapist from South Africa. They have two younger brothers, Richard and Jonty.

Corrin attended the Roman Catholic Woldingham School in Surrey, an all-girls boarding school, where they developed an early interest in acting and singing. After leaving school, Corrin took a gap year, during which they attended a Shakespeare course at the London Academy of Music and Dramatic Art and volunteered as a teacher at a school in Knysna, South Africa.

Corrin initially studied drama at the University of Bristol but left after two months, finding that the course did not offer the practical training they were seeking. They subsequently applied to the University of Cambridge, where they studied Education, English and Drama at St John's College, Cambridge, from 2015 to 2018. During their time at Cambridge, Corrin immersed themself in student theatre, performing in as many productions as possible, while also undertaking voice-over and automated dialogue replacement work in London to gain experience and support themself financially.

== Career ==
Corrin made their television debut in 2019 with a guest appearance in an episode of the ITV detective drama Grantchester, before securing a recurring role as Esme Winikus, an aspiring actress, in the first season of Epix's DC Comics series Pennyworth (2019). The next year, they made their feature film debut as Jillian Jessup, Miss South Africa, in the comedy-drama Misbehaviour (2020).

Corrin's career breakthrough came when they played Diana, Princess of Wales, in the fourth season of the Netflix historical drama series The Crown (2020). Corrin said their casting followed an unusual process: having initially been brought in to read as Diana to help cast another role, they were invited back six months later for a chemistry read with Josh O'Connor (who played Prince Charles) and were offered the role on the spot. Corrin's performance was widely praised by critics. For the role, Corrin won a Golden Globe and a Critics' Choice Award, and was nominated for a Primetime Emmy Award and an Actors Award.

In 2021, Corrin made their professional theatre debut as Anna in Joseph Charlton's play Anna X, staged at the Harold Pinter Theatre, and inspired by the real-life fraud case of Anna Sorokin. Corrin said they were intrigued by how the play explored the existential doubt and absurdity of social media. This performance was also widely praised by critics. Dominic Cavendish of the Daily Telegraph called it a perfect West End debut, and Nick Curtis of The Standard called the performance brilliantly judged. For the role, Corrin was nominated for a Laurence Olivier Award for Best Actress, in addition to nominations for a WhatsOnStage Award and a Stage Debut Award. Corrin also appeared as a spoken‑word contributor on British rapper Little Simz's fourth studio album, Sometimes I Might Be Introvert (2021). They later performed live with Little Simz at the 2022 BRIT Awards, appearing onstage for the song Introvert.

In 2022, Corrin starred in two romantic dramas: My Policeman and Lady Chatterley's Lover. In My Policeman, they play Marion, a schoolteacher drawn into a love triangle in 1950s Britain. Corrin took the role because of the complexity of the different relationships at its centre, and because it "was dealing with issues that were prevalent in the '50s, with homosexuality being illegal", but which they saw as still prevalent today. The film received mixed reviews. In Variety, Peter Debruge wrote, "Corrin could do this role in their sleep", while Jessie Thompson in The Independent felt that Corrin did well with what little they were given to do, particularly in more dramatic scenes where they "ricochet around like a wounded animal".

In Lady Chatterley’s Lover, Corrin starred as Constance Chatterley, a woman who begins an affair after becoming disillusioned with her aristocratic marriage. The critical response to the film was generally positive, and Corrin's performance was praised. IndieWire's Kate Erbland felt that the role was a career highlight for Corrin, while Anna van Praagh of The Standard called their portrayal of Connie faultless.

Later that year, Corrin returned to the West End to star as the title character in Neil Barlett's stage adaptation of Virginia Woolf's Orlando (2022), directed by Michael Grandage at the Garrick Theatre. Corrin's performance drew a positive critical response. David Benedict of Variety wrote that Corrin effortlessly held the audience and blurred "gender boundaries with compelling ease". David Jays of The Guardian called Corrin glorious, writing that they radiated "gleeful intelligence, rampaging heart and tremendous fun".

Corrin next starred as Darby Hart, an amateur sleuth, in the FX series A Murder at the End of the World (2023). Corrin said that the opportunity to play Darby came at a really wonderful time as they were actively looking for something modern and different from their previous roles. Both the series and Corrin's performance were critically acclaimed. Empire's Olly Richards wrote that Corrin played Darby with "charismatic intensity", while Nick Hilton of The Independent felt they brought both mischievous charm and wide-eyed, youthful vulnerability to the role.

After a near two‑year absence, Corrin returned to film in two major productions: as villain Cassandra Nova in Marvel Studios' Deadpool & Wolverine (2024); and as Anna Harding in the Gothic horror film Nosferatu (2024). In 2025, Corrin starred as Nina in Anton Chekhov's play The Seagull at the Barbican Theatre in London. Arifa Akbar of The Guardian wrote that Corrin brought "immense integrity and depth" to the role, while Dominic Cavendish of The Daily Telegraph praised their "winning elfin energy and gawky charm". Houman Barekat of The New York Times, by contrast, felt that Corrin did "not wholly convince as an ambitious ingénue". Corrin was nominated for a WhatsOnStage Award for their performance.

Following an appearance as virtual actor Clara in Hotel Reverie, a feature-length episode of the science fiction series Black Mirror (2025), Corrin played the eponymous Hero in the fantasy romance 100 Nights of Hero (2025). Adapted from Isabel Greenberg's graphic novel of the same name, the film received mostly favourable reviews from critics. Leila Latif of IndieWire called Corrin the film's linchpin and commended their comic timing, while Mia Pflüger of Next Best Picture wrote that they delivered a magnetic and commanding performance. Corrin is set to appear as Elizabeth Bennet in Netflix's Pride and Prejudice series, due for release in late 2026.

== Personal life ==
Corrin is non-binary and uses they/them pronouns: "in my mind, gender just isn't something that feels fixed [and] I don't know if it ever will be." Corrin has said that gendered awards categories are a difficult question and existing categories are not inclusive enough. Whatever the outcome, Corrin has said it is important that non-binary people are involved in decisions about how awards categories are defined, and that they should be seen and honoured for their work.

Corrin came out publicly as queer in 2021. Around that time, they said that coming out felt "scary and revealing" and that they faced online hate speech but were buoyed by the wonderful feedback from the queer community.

Corrin has a longstanding working relationship with the Italian fashion house Miu Miu. They have fronted advertising campaigns for the brand and starred in accompanying short films such as The Pet Psychic (2021). Corrin has also modelled on the runway for Miu Miu, including closing the brand's Autumn/Winter 2023 show at Paris Fashion Week. Alongside this work, Corrin has appeared on the covers of major fashion magazines, including Vogue, where they became the magazine's first non-binary cover star in 2022.

Corrin was in a relationship with actor Rami Malek from 2023 to 2025.

== Acting credits ==
Key
†	Denotes productions that have not yet been released

=== Film ===
Year	Title	Role	Notes	Ref.
2017	Cesare	Mica	Short film	
2018	Alex's Dream	Beth	Short film	
2020	Misbehaviour	Jillian Jessup		
2021	The Pet Psychic	Emma	Short film	
2022	My Policeman	Marion Taylor		
2022	Lady Chatterley's Lover	Lady Chatterley		
2023	Good Grief	Young Performance Artist	Cameo	
2024	Deadpool & Wolverine	Cassandra Nova		
2024	Nosferatu	Anna Harding		
2025	100 Nights of Hero	Hero		
2026	Werwulf	Devil's Voice	Role shared with Tom Burke	
TBA	Untitled Arkasha Stevenson film		Post-production	

=== Television ===
Year	Title	Role	Notes	Ref.
2019	Grantchester	Esther Carter	Episode: "4.4"	
2019	Pennyworth	Esme Winikus	Recurring role (season 1); 4 episodes	
2020	The Crown	Diana, Princess of Wales	Main role (Season 4); 8 episodes	
2022	Ten Percent	Themself	Guest role	
2023	A Murder at the End of the World	Darby Hart	Main role	
2025	Black Mirror	Dorothy Chambers / Clara Ryce-Lechere	Episode: "Hotel Reverie"	
TBA	Pride and Prejudice †	Elizabeth Bennet	Main role	

=== Theatre ===
Year	Title	Role	Playwright	Theatre	Ref.
2021	Anna X	Anna	Joseph Charlton	Harold Pinter Theatre, West End	
2022	Orlando	Orlando	Neil Bartlett	Garrick Theatre, West End	
2025	The Seagull	Nina	Anton Chekov	Barbican Centre, West End	

=== Audio ===
Year	Title	Role	Author	Production company	Ref.
2021	The Sandman: Act II	Thessaly	Neil Gaiman, Dirk Maggs	Audible	
2022	The Sandman: Act III	Thessaly	Neil Gaiman, Dirk Maggs	Audible	

== Awards and nominations ==
Year	Award	Category	Work	Result	Ref.
2021	Critics' Choice Television Awards	Best Actress in a Drama Series	The Crown	Won	
2021	Golden Globe Awards	Best Actress – Television Series Drama	The Crown	Won	
2021	Hollywood Critics Association TV Awards	Best Actress in a Streaming Series, Drama	The Crown	Won	
2021	MTV Movie & TV Awards	Best Performance in a Show	The Crown	Nominated	
2021	Satellite Awards	Best Supporting Actress – Series, Miniseries or Television Film	The Crown	Nominated	
2021	Screen Actors Guild Awards	Outstanding Performance by a Female Actor in a Drama Series	The Crown	Nominated	
2021	Screen Actors Guild Awards	Outstanding Performance by an Ensemble in a Drama Series	The Crown	Won	
2021	Primetime Emmy Awards	Outstanding Lead Actress in a Drama Series	The Crown	Nominated	
2022	Laurence Olivier Awards	Best Actress	Anna X	Nominated	
2022	WhatsOnStage Awards	Best Performer in a Female Identifying Role in a Play	Anna X	Nominated	
2022	The Stage Debut Awards	Best West End Debut Performer	Anna X	Nominated	
2022	Toronto International Film Festival	Tribute Award for Performance	My Policeman	Won	
2024	Independent Spirit Awards	Best Lead Performance in a New Scripted Series	A Murder at the End of the World	Nominated	
2025	Saturn Awards	Best Supporting Actress	Deadpool & Wolverine	Nominated	
2025	Critics' Choice Super Awards	Best Actress in a Superhero Movie	Deadpool & Wolverine	Nominated	
2025	Critics' Choice Super Awards	Best Villain in a Movie	Deadpool & Wolverine	Nominated	
2025	Newport Beach Film Festival	Artist of Distinction		Honoured	
2026	WhatsOnStage Awards	Best Supporting Performer in a Female Identifying Role in a Play	The Seagull	Nominated	
2026	Variety's Power of Women Award			Honoured	
