= Boston Teran =

American novelist

Boston Teran is the pseudonymous American author of 16 novels published from 1999 to 2023. Teran's legal identity is unknown, and the author engages in limited publicity by doing only one interview per book.

Two of Teran's novels have been adapted for the screen: God Is a Bullet (1999 novel, film released 2023) and The Creed of Violence (2010 novel, in development as of 2023).

== Works ==
- God Is a Bullet (1999)
- Never Count Out the Dead (2001)
- The Prince of Deadly Weapons (2002)
- Trois Femmes (2006)
- Giv: The Story of a Dog and America (2009)
- The Creed of Violence (2010)
- Gardens of Grief (2011)
- The World Eve Left Us (2012)
- The Cloud and the Fire (2013)
- The Country I Lived In (2013)
- By Your Deeds (2016)
- A Child Went Forth (2018)
- How Beautiful They Were (2019)
- Two Boys at Breakwater (July 2021)
- Crippled Jack (September 2022)
- Big Island L.A. (October 2023)
- The White Country (March 2024)
- Burn Everything...Then Forget It (September 2026)

== Awards and distinctions ==
- CWA John Creasey Award for best first novel: God Is a Bullet
- Finalist, 2000 Mystery Writers of America Edgar Award for Best First Novel: God Is a Bullet
- Longlist, 2001 International Dublin Literary Award: God Is a Bullet
- Winner, 2001 Japan Adventure Fiction Association Prize: God Is a Bullet
- Longlist, 2011 International Dublin Literary Award: Giv: The Story of a Dog and America
- Finalist, 2011 ForeWord INDIES for Adult Fiction (Historical): Gardens of Grief
- Silver Winner, 2012 ForeWord INDIES for Adult Fiction (Translations): The World Eve Left Us
- Finalist, 2018 Foreword INDIES for Adult Fiction (Historical): A Child Went Forth
- Finalist, 2023 Next Generation INDIE Book Award for Adult Fiction (Historical): Crippled Jack
- Silver Winner, 2023 IBPA Ben Franklin Award for Adult Fiction (Historical): Crippled Jack
- Winner, 2024 American Fiction Awards for Adult Fiction (Urban Fiction): Big Island, LA
- Finalist, 2024 American Fiction Awards for Adult Fiction (Mystery/Suspense: Hard-Boiled/Crime): Big Island, LA
- Finalist, 2026 American Legacy Book Award for Historical Fiction: The White Country
