= Victorian Psycho (film) =

2026 horror film by Zachary Wigon

- American theatrical release poster
- Directed by: Zachary Wigon
- Written by: Virginia Feito
- Based on: Victorian Psycho by Virginia Feito
- Produced by: Dan Kagan; Zachary Wigon; Sebastien Raybaud; Liz Siegal; Nick Shumaker
- Starring: Maika Monroe; Thomasin McKenzie; Ruth Wilson; Jason Isaacs
- Cinematography: Nico Aguilar
- Edited by: Dustin Chow; Lance Edmands
- Music by: Ariel Marx
- Production companies: Traffic.; Anton
- Distributed by: Bleecker Street
- Release dates: 21 May 2026 (Cannes); 13 November 2026 (United States)
- Running time: 102 minutes
- Countries: United Kingdom; Ireland
- Language: English
- Box office: $2 million

Victorian Psycho is a 2026 horror thriller film directed by Zachary Wigon, written by Virginia Feito and based on her 2025 novel of the same name. It stars Maika Monroe, Thomasin McKenzie, Ruth Wilson and Jason Isaacs.

The film had its world premiere in the Un Certain Regard section of the 2026 Cannes Film Festival on 21 May. Victorian Psycho is scheduled for release in the United States on November 13, 2026. It received mixed to positive reviews from critics.

== Plot ==
In 1858, Winifred Notty arrives at the remote gothic manor, Ensor House, to be the governess to the Pounds's two children, Drusilla and Andrew. Her first outing with the pair culminates in Winifred bludgeoning a resting deer to death and threatening Andrew when he informs his mother about the events. Winifred is seeking to escape her past, but the gardener quickly confronts her about her previous charges' disappearances in an attempt to blackmail her. When she meets the gardener that night, she murders him with an axe and feeds his remains to the estate's pigs.

To further cover up the killing of the gardener, she befriends the estate's nurse, Sue Lamb. Despite her wishes to become a part of the Pounds family, her erratic behavior causes the family and employees to be unsettled--including the carving of Mr. Pounds's family members' portraits. During a gathering of other wealthy members in the area, an Egyptian mummy is presented and unraveled to the adults' amusement. Drusilla draws pornographic caricatures of the guests, including her father, performing necrophiliac acts on the mummy. Enraged, Mr. Pounds shoots the notebook containing the drawings while Drusilla is holding it. Drusilla feels no regrets about her actions, only that the drawings were not of a better quality, causing Winifred to wonder if Drusilla's "darkness" was present at her birth, as was hers, or came about upon her arrival at the estate.

Despite neither parent liking nor caring about Drusilla, Winifred is forced to sleep in the dogs' kennel that night by Mrs. Pounds as punishment for Drusilla's drawings. Upon leaving the kennel that morning, Sue sees Winifred while caring for one of the guests' infant and attempts to clean her face. While her face is being washed, Winifred confides in Sue that she murdered the gardener. Sue initially does not believe this claim, but when she realizes it is true, backs away from Winifred fearing for her life. Winifred attempts to defuse her fears over a glass of tea; but when Sue splashes the tea of Winifred's face and says she will tell the Pounds, Winifred crushes a tea glass and uses a shard of porcelain to slit Sue's throat. When the infant Sue was tending to begins to cry due to the noise, Winifred initially attempts to soothe the infant. However, she slits the infant's throat when she hallucinates the child speaking the same words that Sue spoke shortly before her own killing. Winifred kidnaps a worker's infant while their mother was not looking and dress them in the same clothes as the dead one, hoping the original infant's family would notice the difference between the two children. She unceremoniously dumps the two bodies out the room's window.

After Mr. Pounds attempts to seduce Winifred from a phrenological exam, she reveals to him that he is her birth father. He initially dismissed this claim before Winifred pulls out a letter he wrote Winifred's mother when she was a year old, urging her to kill their child--his command was attempted by Winifred's mother at the time of the letter and multiple times throughout Winifred's life. Enraged Winifred's mother did not actually follow through with this command, Mr. Pounds fires Winifred and forces her to vacate the estate that day.

Winifred hides in the woods by the estate until Andrew's birthday. On his birthday, she releases "Fred"--the "demon" she had told Andrew lived inside her. Winifred hallucinates having a meal as a true member of the Pounds's family while, in reality, killing the workers, Mrs. Pounds, Andrew, and Mr. Pounds, the last of whom almost succeeds in killing Winifred before Drusilla stabs him; the sisters murder their father together.

The next morning, Drusilla feigns innocence to the police that arrive to her home, telling them Winifred killed everyone in the estate besides her. Winifred is arrested and convicted of the massacre at the Ensor House. On the day of her hanging, she spots Drusilla in the crowd gleefully smiling. Winifred smirks at this act before the screen cuts to black just before her hanging.

== Cast ==
- Maika Monroe as Winifred Notty
- Thomasin McKenzie as Ms. Lamb
- Ruth Wilson as Mrs. Pounds
- Jason Isaacs as Mr. Pounds
- Jacobi Jupe as Andrew Pounds
- Evie Templeton as Drusilla Pounds
- Amy De Bhrún as Mrs. Fancey

== Production ==
=== Development ===
Victorian Psycho was directed by Zachary Wigon and written by Virginia Feito. It was produced by Traffic's Dan Kagan and Anton's Sebastien Raybaud alongside Wigon, in association with Anonymous Content. Anton fully financed the project.

=== Casting ===
In October 2024, it was announced that Margaret Qualley was cast in the film. In November 2024, it was announced that McKenzie was also cast in the film. In December 2024, A24 acquired U.S. distribution rights to the film. By May 2025, Qualley had exited the film, with Maika Monroe replacing her, and A24 was no longer distributing the film. Jason Isaacs also joined the cast.

=== Filming ===
Principal photography on the film began on 18 August 2025, in Ireland, with Bleecker Street acquiring U.S. distribution rights to the film and aiming for a 2026 nationwide theatrical release.

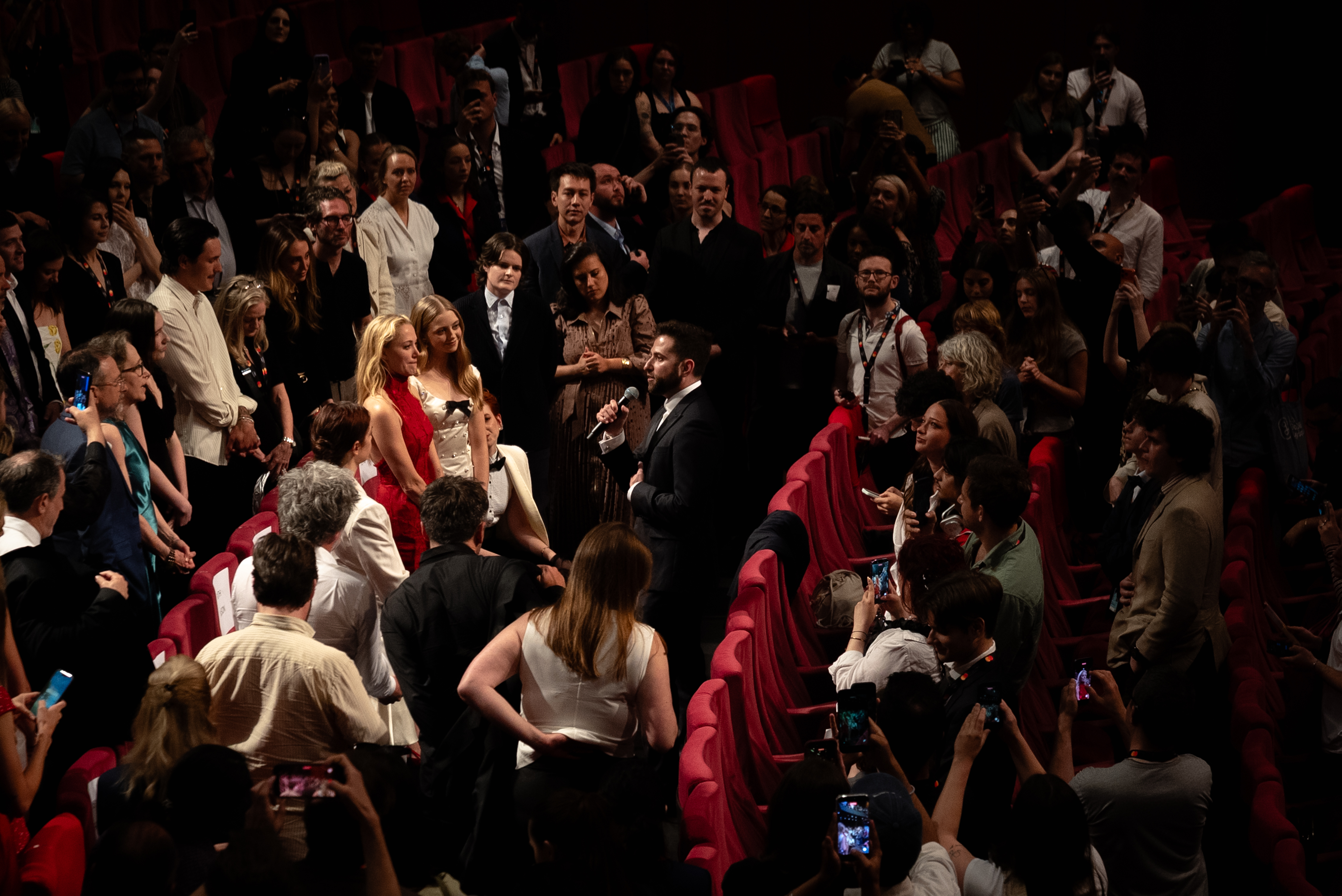
Cast and crew during the 2026 Cannes Film Festival

== Release ==
In July 2025, True Brit Entertainment acquired the U.K. and Ireland distribution rights.

The film had its world premiere at the Un Certain Regard section of the 2026 Cannes Film Festival on 21 May. It is scheduled to be released theatrically in the United States by Bleecker Street on 13 November 2026. It was previously scheduled to release in the United States on 25 September 2026.

== Reception ==
On the review aggregator website Rotten Tomatoes, 75% of 99 critics' reviews are positive, with an average rating of 6.5/10. The website's consensus reads: "An enjoyably blood-soaked lark that thrives on Maika Monroe's ferocious lead performance, Victorian Psycho delivers plenty of wicked fun and literary wit." Metacritic, which uses a weighted average, assigned the film a score of 54 out of 100, based on 23 critics, indicating "mixed or average" reviews.
