= God Is a Bullet (novel) =

Novel by Boston Teran

- Author: Boston Teran
- Language: English
- Publication date: 1999

God Is a Bullet is a 1999 mystery novel by Boston Teran. The novel follows sheriff's deputy Bob Hightower whose ex-wife has been murdered and his teenage daughter kidnapped by a satanic cult. Hightower searches for his daughter with the help of Case Hardin, an escaped victim of the cult.

The novel was published by Alfred A. Knopf. It won the CWA New Blood Dagger award, and was a finalist in the Edgar Awards.

The novel was made into a 2023 film of the same name.
