= Labor Day (novel) =

Novel by Joyce Maynard

- Cover of novel
- Author: Joyce Maynard
- Language: English
- Genre: Novel
- Publisher: William Morrow and Company
- Publication date: 2009
- Publication place: United States
- Media type: Print (hardback & paperback)
- Pages: 244
- ISBN: 0-06-184340-7

Labor Day is a 2009 coming-of-age novel by the American author Joyce Maynard.

== Plot summary ==
Henry Wheeler, a man in his early 30s, recounts his thirteenth year. As Labor Day weekend approaches, 13-year-old Henry sees no reason why this weekend should be any different. He expects it to be as lonely as the rest of the summer, only watching television, playing with his pet hamster and fantasizing about his female classmates.

Henry shares his life in New Hampshire with his depressed, and divorced mother, Adele. Adele's agoraphobia means that the family survives on unedifying tinned foods and frozen meals. On the Thursday before the Labor Day weekend, Henry persuades his mother to go on a shopping trip. There, they meet an unkempt man who is bleeding from his forehead and agree to his request for a ride in their car.

This mysterious man, Frank, admits that he is a convicted murderer who has escaped prison. Despite his past, Frank makes the claim that the mother and son have "never been in better hands". Indeed, Frank teaches Henry how to throw a baseball, change a flat tire and to bake. Meanwhile, Adele and Frank, long love-starved, become infatuated with each other, and Adele emerges from her depression.

== Reception ==
The Washington Post noted that "It is a testament to Maynard's skill that she makes this ominous setup into a convincing and poignant coming-of-age tale." In The New York Times, Jodi Picoult praised the work; "Joyce Maynard is in top-notch form with Labor Day. Simply a novel you cannot miss."

== Film adaptation ==
In late 2009, it was announced that director Jason Reitman was in the process of adapting a script for Joyce Maynard's novel entitled Labor Day. On June 16, 2011, it was announced that Kate Winslet and Josh Brolin committed to star as the film's leads Adele and Frank, respectively. This was followed by news that Paramount Pictures and Indian Paintbrush would co-produce the film, with Paramount in charge of the film's distribution.

Principal photography for the film began on June 13, 2012, in Massachusetts. The filming locations included Shelburne, Acton, Mansfield, Natick, and Medway, Massachusetts.
