= List of accolades received by 1917 (2019 film) =

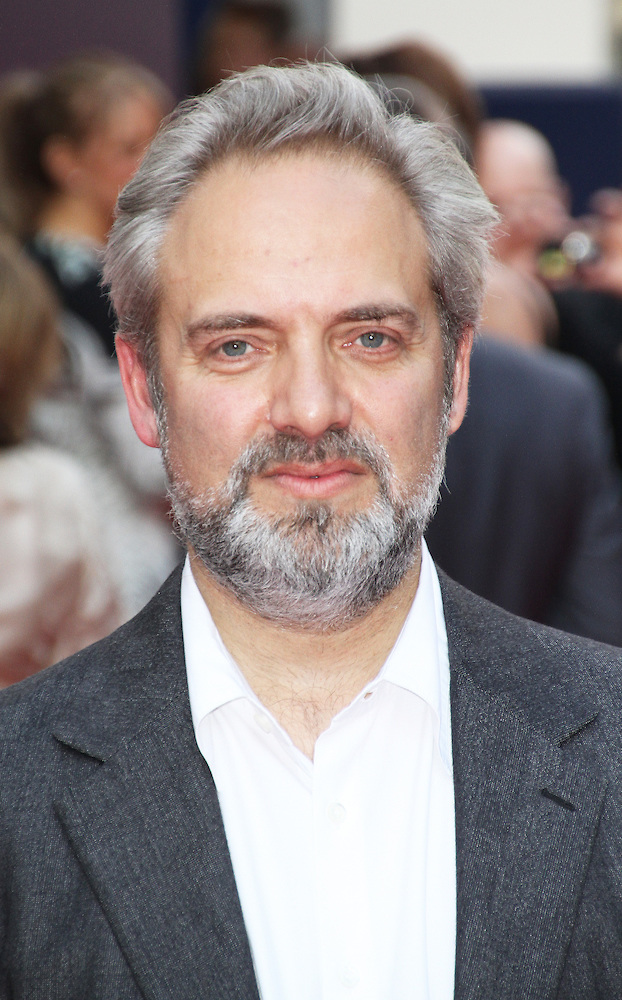
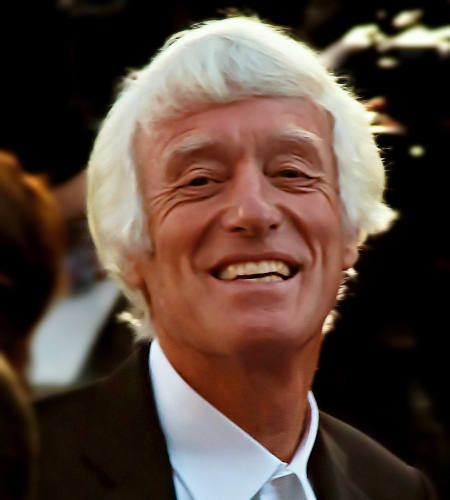
- Sam Mendes received critical acclaim for directing and co-writing the film and Roger Deakins for his cinematography
Accolades
Award	Wins	Nominations
AACTA Awards	0	1
AARP's Movies for Grownups Awards	0	1
Academy Awards	3	10
American Society of Cinematographers	1	1
Art Directors Guild Awards	0	1
Austin Film Critics Association	2	3
Belgian Film Critics Association	1	1
British Academy Film Awards	7	9
Casting Society of America	0	1
Chicago Film Critics Association	1	5
Cinema for Peace	1	1
Critics' Choice Movie Awards	3	8
Dallas-Fort Worth Film Critics Association	4	4
Detroit Film Critics Society	0	1
Directors Guild of America Awards	1	1
Dorian Awards	1	2
Florida Film Critics Circle	3	5
Georgia Film Critics Association	3	5
Golden Globe Awards	2	3
Golden Reel Awards	1	2
Grammy Awards	0	1
Hollywood Critics Association Awards	4	7
Houston Film Critics Society	3	5
IGN Awards	0	4
IndieWire Critics Poll	3	3
International Cinephile Society	0	2
International Film Music Critics Association	1	3
Location Managers Guild Awards	0	1
London Film Critics' Circle	0	6
Los Angeles Film Critics Association	2	2
Movieguide Awards	0	1
National Board of Review	2	2
New York Film Critics Online	2	2
Online Film Critics Society	1	5
Producers Guild of America Award	1	1
Robert Awards	1	1
San Diego Film Critics Society	3	5
San Francisco Bay Area Film Critics Circle	1	6
Santa Barbara International Film Festival	1	1
San Diego Film Critics Society	3	5
Satellite Awards	1	8
Saturn Awards	0	2
Seattle Film Critics Society	1	7
St. Louis Film Critics Association	7	8
Vancouver Film Critics Circle	0	1
Visual Effects Society	0	1
Washington D.C. Area Film Critics Association	1	6
World Soundtrack Awards	0	1
Writers Guild of America Awards	0	1

Totals (Note: Certain award groups do not simply award one winner. They acknowledge several different recipients, have runners-up, and have third place. Since this is a specific recognition and is different from losing an award, runner-up mentions are considered wins in this award tally. For simplification and to avoid errors, each award in this list has been presumed to have had a prior nomination.)
- Wins: 72
- Nominations: 163

1917 is a 2019 epic war film co-written and directed by Sam Mendes. The film stars George MacKay, Dean-Charles Chapman, Mark Strong, Andrew Scott, Richard Madden, Claire Duburcq, Colin Firth, and Benedict Cumberbatch. Based in part on an account told to Mendes by his paternal grandfather, Alfred Mendes, it chronicles the story of two young British soldiers in the spring of 1917 during World War I, who are given a mission to deliver a message warning of an ambush, soon after the German retreat to the Hindenburg Line during Operation Alberich. Thomas Newman composed the film's musical score, while Roger Deakins was the cinematographer. Dennis Gassner and Lee Sandales were responsible for the production design, and Scott Millan, Oliver Tarney, Rachael Tate, Mark Taylor, and Stuart Wilson were responsible for the sound effects.

After debuting at the Royal Film Performance on 4 December 2019, Universal Pictures initially gave the film a limited release in eleven cinemas in the United States and Canada on 25 December. The film was later given a wide release in the United States and the United Kingdom on 10 January 2020. 1917 grossed a worldwide total of $385 million on a production budget of $95 million. Rotten Tomatoes, a review aggregator, surveyed 472 reviews and judged 88% to be positive.

The film garnered awards and nominations in a variety of categories with particular praise for its direction, cinematography, sound effects, score, and visual effects. It garnered ten nominations at the 92nd Academy Awards including Best Picture and Best Director for Mendes. The film went on to win three awards, including Best Cinematography (Deakins), Best Sound Mixing (Taylor and Wilson), and Best Visual Effects. At the 73rd British Academy Film Awards, 1917 received nine nominations and won seven awards including Best Film, Best Direction, Best Cinematography, and Best Production Design. The film received three nominations at the 77th Golden Globe Awards, winning two, including Best Motion Picture – Drama and Best Director.

At the 31st Producers Guild of America Awards, 1917 won for Best Theatrical Motion Picture. Mendes won Outstanding Directing – Feature Film at the 72nd Directors Guild of America Awards. At the 25th Critics' Choice Awards, the film was nominated for eight awards. It won three, including Best Director (tied with Bong Joon-ho for Parasite), Best Cinematography, and Best Editing. In addition, both the American Film Institute and the National Board of Review selected 1917 as one of the top ten films of the year.

== Accolades ==
Award	Date of ceremony	Category	Recipients	Result	Ref.
AACTA Awards	4 January 2020	Best International Direction	Sam Mendes	Nominated	
AARP's Movies for Grownups Awards	19 January 2020	Best Director	Sam Mendes	Nominated	
Academy Awards	9 February 2020	Best Picture	Sam Mendes, Pippa Harris, Jayne-Ann Tenggren and Callum McDougal	Nominated	
Academy Awards	9 February 2020	Best Director	Sam Mendes	Nominated	
Academy Awards	9 February 2020	Best Original Screenplay	Sam Mendes and Krysty Wilson-Cairns	Nominated	
Academy Awards	9 February 2020	Best Cinematography	Roger Deakins	Won	
Academy Awards	9 February 2020	Best Makeup and Hairstyling	Naomi Donne, Tristan Versluis and Rebecca Cole	Nominated	
Academy Awards	9 February 2020	Best Original Score	Thomas Newman	Nominated	
Academy Awards	9 February 2020	Best Production Design	Dennis Gassner and Lee Sandales	Nominated	
Academy Awards	9 February 2020	Best Sound Editing	Oliver Tarney and Rachael Tate	Nominated	
Academy Awards	9 February 2020	Best Sound Mixing	Mark Taylor and Stuart Wilson	Won	
Academy Awards	9 February 2020	Best Visual Effects	Guillaume Rocheron, Greg Butler and Dominic Tuohy	Won	
American Society of Cinematographers	25 January 2020	Outstanding Achievement in Cinematography in Theatrical Releases	Roger Deakins	Won	
Art Directors Guild Awards	1 February 2020	Excellence in Production Design for a Period Film	Dennis Gassner	Nominated	
Austin Film Critics Association	6 January 2020	Best Cinematography	Roger Deakins	Won	
Austin Film Critics Association	6 January 2020	Best Editing	Lee Smith	Nominated	
Austin Film Critics Association	6 January 2020	Best Original Score	Thomas Newman	Won	
Belgian Film Critics Association	28 December 2020	Grand Prix	1917	Won	
British Academy Film Awards	2 February 2020	Best Film	Pippa Harris, Callum McDougall, Sam Mendes and Jayne-Ann Tenggren	Won	
British Academy Film Awards	2 February 2020	Outstanding British Film	Sam Mendes, Pippa Harris, Callum McDougall, Jayne-Ann Tenggren and Krysty Wilson-Cairns	Won	
British Academy Film Awards	2 February 2020	Best Director	Sam Mendes	Won	
British Academy Film Awards	2 February 2020	Best Original Score	Thomas Newman	Nominated	
British Academy Film Awards	2 February 2020	Best Cinematography	Roger Deakins	Won	
British Academy Film Awards	2 February 2020	Best Makeup and Hair	Naomi Donne	Nominated	
British Academy Film Awards	2 February 2020	Best Production Design	Dennis Gassner and Lee Sandales	Won	
British Academy Film Awards	2 February 2020	Best Sound	Scott Millan, Oliver Tarney, Rachael Tate, Mark Taylor and Stuart Wilson	Won	
British Academy Film Awards	2 February 2020	Best Special Visual Effects	Greg Butler, Guillaume Rocheron and Dominic Tuohy	Won	
Casting Society of America	30 January 2020	Feature Big Budget – Drama	Nina Gold	Nominated	
César Awards	12 March 2021	Best Foreign Film	1917	Nominated	
Chicago Film Critics Association	14 December 2019	Best Art Direction	Dennis Gassner and Lee Sandales	Nominated	
Chicago Film Critics Association	14 December 2019	Best Cinematography	Roger Deakins	Won	
Chicago Film Critics Association	14 December 2019	Best Editing	Lee Smith	Nominated	
Chicago Film Critics Association	14 December 2019	Best Original Score	Thomas Newman	Nominated	
Chicago Film Critics Association	14 December 2019	Best Use of Visual Effects	1917	Nominated	
Cinema for Peace	23 February 2020	Cinema for Peace Award for the Most Valuable Film of the Year	Sam Mendes, Pippa Harris, Jayne-Ann Tenggren and Callum McDougal	Won	
Critics' Choice Awards	12 January 2020	Best Picture	1917	Nominated	
Critics' Choice Awards	12 January 2020	Best Director	Sam Mendes	Won (Note: Tied with Bong Joon-ho for Parasite)	
Critics' Choice Awards	12 January 2020	Best Cinematography	Roger Deakins	Won	
Critics' Choice Awards	12 January 2020	Best Film Editing	Lee Smith	Won	
Critics' Choice Awards	12 January 2020	Best Original Score	Thomas Newman	Nominated	
Critics' Choice Awards	12 January 2020	Best Production Design	Dennis Gassner and Lee Sandales	Nominated	
Critics' Choice Awards	12 January 2020	Best Visual Effects	Guillaume Rocheron, Greg Butler and Dominic Tuohy	Nominated	
Critics' Choice Awards	12 January 2020	Best Action Movie	1917	Nominated	
Dallas–Fort Worth Film Critics Association	16 December 2019	Best Film	1917	Won	
Dallas–Fort Worth Film Critics Association	16 December 2019	Best Director	Sam Mendes	Won	
Dallas–Fort Worth Film Critics Association	16 December 2019	Best Cinematography	Roger Deakins	Won	
Dallas–Fort Worth Film Critics Association	16 December 2019	Best Musical Score	Thomas Newman	Won	
David di Donatello	11 May 2021	Best Foreign Film	1917	Won	
Detroit Film Critics Society	9 December 2019	Best Use of Music	1917	Nominated	
Directors Guild of America Awards	25 January 2020	Outstanding Directing – Feature Film	Sam Mendes	Won	
Dorian Awards	8 January 2020	Director of the Year	Sam Mendes	Nominated	
Dorian Awards	8 January 2020	Visually Striking Film of the Year	1917	Won	
Florida Film Critics Circle	23 December 2019	Best Film	1917	Runner-up	
Florida Film Critics Circle	23 December 2019	Best Director	Sam Mendes	Runner-up	
Florida Film Critics Circle	23 December 2019	Best Cinematography	Roger Deakins	Won	
Florida Film Critics Circle	23 December 2019	Best Art Direction / Production	Dennis Gassner and Lee Sandales	Nominated	
Florida Film Critics Circle	23 December 2019	Best Score	Thomas Newman	Nominated	
Georgia Film Critics Association	10 January 2020	Best Picture	1917	Nominated	
Georgia Film Critics Association	10 January 2020	Best Director	Sam Mendes	Nominated	
Georgia Film Critics Association	10 January 2020	Best Cinematography	Roger Deakins	Won	
Georgia Film Critics Association	10 January 2020	Best Production Design	Dennis Gassner and Lee Sandales	Won	
Georgia Film Critics Association	10 January 2020	Best Original Score	Thomas Newman	Won	
Golden Globe Awards	5 January 2020	Best Picture – Drama	1917	Won	
Golden Globe Awards	5 January 2020	Best Director	Sam Mendes	Won	
Golden Globe Awards	5 January 2020	Best Original Score	Thomas Newman	Nominated	
Golden Eagle Award	22 January 2021	Best Foreign Language Film	1917	Won	
Golden Reel Awards	19 January 2020	Outstanding Achievement in Sound Editing – Dialogue and ADR	Oliver Tarney and Rachael Tate	Won	
Golden Reel Awards	19 January 2020	Outstanding Achievement in Sound Editing – Effects and Foley	Oliver Tarney, Michael Fentum, James Harrison, Hugo Adams, Sue Harding and Andrea King	Nominated	
Grammy Awards	March 14, 2021	Best Score Soundtrack for Visual Media	Thomas Newman	Nominated	
Hollywood Critics Association Awards	9 January 2020	Best Picture	1917	Won	
Hollywood Critics Association Awards	9 January 2020	Best Action / War Film	1917	Won	
Hollywood Critics Association Awards	9 January 2020	Best Cinematography	Roger Deakins	Won	
Hollywood Critics Association Awards	9 January 2020	Best Editing	Lee Smith	Won	
Hollywood Critics Association Awards	9 January 2020	Best Score	Thomas Newman	Nominated	
Hollywood Critics Association Awards	9 January 2020	Best Stunt Work	1917	Nominated	
Hollywood Critics Association Awards	9 January 2020	Best Visual Effects	Guillaume Rocheron, Greg Butler and Dominic Tuohy	Nominated	
Houston Film Critics Society	2 January 2020	Best Picture	1917	Nominated	
Houston Film Critics Society	2 January 2020	Best Director	Sam Mendes	Nominated	
Houston Film Critics Society	2 January 2020	Best Cinematography	Roger Deakins	Won	
Houston Film Critics Society	2 January 2020	Best Original Score	Thomas Newman	Won	
Houston Film Critics Society	2 January 2020	Best Visual Effects	Guillaume Rocheron, Greg Butler and Dominic Tuohy	Won	
IGN Awards	21 December 2019	Best Movie of the Year	1917	Nominated	
IGN Awards	21 December 2019	Best Action Movie of the Year	1917	Nominated	
IGN Awards	21 December 2019	Best Director	Sam Mendes	Nominated	
IGN Awards	21 December 2019	Best Lead Performer	George MacKay	Nominated	
IndieWire Critics Poll	16 December 2019	Best Film	1917	21st place	
IndieWire Critics Poll	16 December 2019	Best Director	Sam Mendes	11th place	
IndieWire Critics Poll	16 December 2019	Best Cinematography	Roger Deakins	Won	
International Cinephile Society	4 February 2020	Best Cinematography	Roger Deakins	Nominated	
International Cinephile Society	4 February 2020	Best Sound Design	Oliver Tarney, Rachel Tate, Mark Taylor, and Stuart Wilson	Nominated	
International Film Music Critics Association	20 February 2020	Best Original Score for an Action/Adventure/Thriller Film	Thomas Newman	Won	
International Film Music Critics Association	20 February 2020	Film Music Composition of the Year	"The Night Window" by Thomas Newman	Nominated	
International Film Music Critics Association	20 February 2020	Film Score of the Year	Thomas Newman	Nominated	
Location Managers Guild Awards	24 October 2020	Outstanding Locations in a Period Film	Emma Pill	Nominated	
London Film Critics' Circle	30 January 2020	Film of the Year	1917	Nominated	
London Film Critics' Circle	30 January 2020	British/Irish Film of the Year: The Attenborough Award	1917	Nominated	
London Film Critics' Circle	30 January 2020	Director of the Year	Sam Mendes	Nominated	
London Film Critics' Circle	30 January 2020	Best British/Irish Actor	George MacKay	Nominated	
London Film Critics' Circle	30 January 2020	Best Young British/Irish Performer	Dean-Charles Chapman	Nominated	
London Film Critics' Circle	30 January 2020	Technical Achievement Award	Oliver Tarney	Nominated	
Los Angeles Film Critics Association	8 December 2019	Best Cinematography	Roger Deakins	Runner-up	
Los Angeles Film Critics Association	8 December 2019	Best Music	Thomas Newman	Runner-up	
Movieguide Awards	24 January 2020	Best Movie for Mature Audiences	1917	Nominated	
National Board of Review	3 December 2019	Top 10 Films	1917	Won	
National Board of Review	3 December 2019	Outstanding Achievement in Cinematography	Roger Deakins	Won	
New York Film Critics Online	7 December 2019	Top 10 Films	1917	Won	
New York Film Critics Online	7 December 2019	Best Cinematography	Roger Deakins	Won	
Online Film Critics Society	6 January 2020	Best Picture	1917	Nominated	
Online Film Critics Society	6 January 2020	Best Director	Sam Mendes	Nominated	
Online Film Critics Society	6 January 2020	Best Editing	Lee Smith	Nominated	
Online Film Critics Society	6 January 2020	Best Cinematography	Roger Deakins	Won	
Online Film Critics Society	6 January 2020	Best Original Score	Thomas Newman	Nominated	
Producers Guild of America Awards	18 January 2020	Best Theatrical Motion Picture	Sam Mendes, Pippa Harris, Jayne-Ann Tenggren and Callum McDougal	Won	
Robert Awards	6 February 2021	Best English-language Feature	Sam Mendes	Won	
San Diego Film Critics Society	9 December 2019	Best Picture	1917	Nominated	
San Diego Film Critics Society	9 December 2019	Best Director	Sam Mendes	Nominated	
San Diego Film Critics Society	9 December 2019	Best Cinematography	Roger Deakins	Runner-up	
San Diego Film Critics Society	9 December 2019	Best Production Design	Dennis Gassner	Won	
San Diego Film Critics Society	9 December 2019	Best Visual Effects	Guillaume Rocheron, Greg Butler and Dominic Tuohy	Runner-up	
San Francisco Bay Area Film Critics Circle	16 December 2019	Best Film	1917	Nominated	
San Francisco Bay Area Film Critics Circle	16 December 2019	Best Director	Sam Mendes	Nominated	
San Francisco Bay Area Film Critics Circle	16 December 2019	Best Cinematography	Roger Deakins	Won	
San Francisco Bay Area Film Critics Circle	16 December 2019	Best Production Design	Dennis Gassner	Nominated	
San Francisco Bay Area Film Critics Circle	16 December 2019	Best Film Editing	Lee Smith	Nominated	
San Francisco Bay Area Film Critics Circle	16 December 2019	Best Original Score	Thomas Newman	Nominated	
Santa Barbara International Film Festival	18 January 2020	Virtuosos Award	George MacKay	Won	
Satellite Awards	19 December 2019	Best Motion Picture, Drama	1917	Nominated	
Satellite Awards	19 December 2019	Best Director	Sam Mendes	Nominated	
Satellite Awards	19 December 2019	Best Actor, Drama	George MacKay	Nominated	
Satellite Awards	19 December 2019	Best Art Direction and Production Design	Dennis Gassner and Lee Sandales	Nominated	
Satellite Awards	19 December 2019	Best Cinematography	Roger Deakins	Won	
Satellite Awards	19 December 2019	Best Film Editing	Lee Smith	Nominated	
Satellite Awards	19 December 2019	Best Original Score	Thomas Newman	Nominated	
Satellite Awards	19 December 2019	Best Sound	Oliver Tarney, Stuart Wilson, Scott Millan and Mark Taylor	Nominated	
Saturn Awards	26 October 2021	Best Action or Adventure Film	1917	Nominated	
Saturn Awards	26 October 2021	Best Music	Thomas Newman	Nominated	
Seattle Film Critics Society	16 December 2019	Best Picture	1917	Nominated	
Seattle Film Critics Society	16 December 2019	Best Action Choreography	1917	Nominated	
Seattle Film Critics Society	16 December 2019	Best Cinematography	Roger Deakins	Won	
Seattle Film Critics Society	16 December 2019	Best Film Editing	Lee Smith	Nominated	
Seattle Film Critics Society	16 December 2019	Best Original Score	Thomas Newman	Nominated	
Seattle Film Critics Society	16 December 2019	Best Production Design	Dennis Gassner and Lee Sandales	Nominated	
Seattle Film Critics Society	16 December 2019	Best Visual Effects	Guillaume Rocheron, Greg Butler and Dominic Tuohy	Nominated	
St. Louis Film Critics Association	15 December 2019	Best Film	1917	Runner-up	
St. Louis Film Critics Association	15 December 2019	Best Director	Sam Mendes	Nominated	
St. Louis Film Critics Association	15 December 2019	Best Editing	Lee Smith	Runner-up (Note: Tied with Thelma Schoonmaker for The Irishman)	
St. Louis Film Critics Association	15 December 2019	Best Cinematography	Roger Deakins	Won	
St. Louis Film Critics Association	15 December 2019	Best Production Design	Dennis Gassner	Runner-up (Note: Tied with Jess Gonchor for Little Women)	
St. Louis Film Critics Association	15 December 2019	Best Visual Effects	Guillaume Rocheron, Greg Butler and Dominic Tuohy	Runner-up (Note: Tied with Ad Astra)	
St. Louis Film Critics Association	15 December 2019	Best Music Score	Thomas Newman	Won	
St. Louis Film Critics Association	15 December 2019	Best Action Film	1917	Won	
Vancouver Film Critics Circle	16 December 2019	Best Director	Sam Mendes	Nominated	
Visual Effects Society Awards	29 January 2020	Outstanding Supporting Visual Effects in a Photoreal Feature	Guillaume Rocheron, Sona Pak, Greg Butler, Vijay Selvam and Dominic Tuohy	Nominated	
Washington D.C. Area Film Critics Association	8 December 2019	Best Film	1917	Nominated	
Washington D.C. Area Film Critics Association	8 December 2019	Best Director	Sam Mendes	Nominated	
Washington D.C. Area Film Critics Association	8 December 2019	Best Production Design	Dennis Gassner and Lee Sandales	Nominated	
Washington D.C. Area Film Critics Association	8 December 2019	Best Cinematography	Roger Deakins	Won	
Washington D.C. Area Film Critics Association	8 December 2019	Best Editing	Lee Smith	Nominated	
Washington D.C. Area Film Critics Association	8 December 2019	Best Original Score	Thomas Newman	Nominated	
World Soundtrack Awards	24 October 2020	Film Composer of the Year	Thomas Newman	Nominated	
Writers Guild of America Awards	1 February 2020	Best Original Screenplay	Sam Mendes and Krysty Wilson-Cairns	Nominated	

== See also ==
- 2019 in film
