= 1917 (soundtrack) =

1917 (Original Motion Picture Soundtrack)

Film score by Thomas Newman
- Released: 20 December 2019
- Studio: Abbey Road Studios
- Genre: Orchestral
- Length: 1:17:08
- Labels: Amblin Partners (Note: Listed under Storyteller Distribution Co., LLC); Sony Classical
- Producers: Bill Bernstein; Thomas Newman

Thomas Newman chronology
Tolkien (2019)	1917 (2019)	Let Them All Talk (2020)

1917 (Original Motion Picture Soundtrack) is the album to the Sam Mendes-directed war film 1917 featuring original score composed by Thomas Newman. The film marked Thomas' seventh collaboration with Mendes after American Beauty (1999), Road to Perdition (2002), Jarhead (2005), Revolutionary Road (2008), Skyfall (2012) and Spectre (2015).

The film's score was recorded before and during the film's production. Initially three musicians recorded the score at Los Angeles, before recruiting an 87-piece orchestra which performed the score at the Abbey Road Studios in London. Orchestrated by J. A. C. Redford and conducted by Thomas Newman, the sessions held for nine weeks. Thomas considered it as his most challenging score, in terms of vocabulary, execution, and production.

The soundtrack was released by Sony Classical Records on 20 December 2019. It received mixed reviews from music critics, but was also nominated for Best Original Score in several ceremonies, especially at the Academy Awards, British Academy Film Awards, Critics' Choice Awards, Golden Globe Awards, Satellite Awards and Grammy Awards, losing all to Hildur Guðnadóttir for Joker (2019).

== Background ==
"The movie is in present tense and because of that, music cannot comment because that puts you a couple of seconds behind present tense. Music is there to help, but the way in which it helps must be fundamental and visceral as opposed to intellectual and reflective.

— Thomas Newman

The film is composed and scored by Mendes' regular collaborator Thomas Newman, with whom he had discussed the musical ideas before scoring the film, and had understood the tense journey of the film needed to come around a sense of human redemption in the end. Describing the experience of time, it felt that "exploring musical time works in lockstep with or in counterpoint to film time". Since the film takes in present tense, he felt that "the more the music commented on any particular action, the less exciting it was likely to be".

In April 2019, before Mendes began filming for the film, Thomas described his musical ideas to Mendes without seeing the final edit. Given that the one-shot concept he would experiment on the pacing and rhythm of the film's music, where in a sequence, Blake (Dean-Charles Chapman) and Schofield (George MacKay) walking out of General Erinmore's (Colin Firth) dugout and onto the front line, Thomas intended that the music had to create excitement but could not get in the "way of the story". Hence he learnt a lot about pacing, though it was not related to "being outspoken or colorful" but had a sense of neutral pace to understand the "tick-tocking aspect of the film".

== Recording and composition ==
Thomas did not begin scoring with an orchestra, but instead with three musicians in Los Angeles that he regularly worked with. Since it was a war film, he felt important to use snare drums and instruments associated with it to produce a "military sound" but not "too military" as the director did not want the music to fit into a particular type, but needed it to drive the film forward. Ultimately, through his discussions, Thomas brought lap dulcimers and processed field cadences as the sound for the film. The 87-piece orchestra included strings, solo cello, brass, wind instruments, drums and percussions, which was laid with electronic, modeled sounds as a base for the score as it "hides the intent more and allows for an orchestra to grow out of something, as opposed to being there to begin with".

Thomas considered the film as his most challenging film's he worked on both in terms of vocabulary, execution and composition. He worked for many months in Los Angeles and moved to London in September to record the orchestral portions at the Abbey Road Studios for nine weeks. He called it "physically exhausting" as he worked without a day off. He felt that there was a "certain sense of satisfaction having made in one piece". The climatic six-minute musical piece was recorded in a single take.

== Reception ==
=== Critical response ===
In a negative review, James Southall of Movie Wave rated two stars summarising: "This lengthy album is a very difficult one to summarise. A very large part of it is really not at all satisfying away from the film, but then every now and again something comes along which is just outrageously good – and part of the reason it's so good is the contrast with what's around it. In this case, when you do you get a few minutes of the best music Thomas Newman has written in years, but even so it's a very hard slog to get there." Filmtracks.com wrote "[Thomas] Newman's work for 1917 is as psychologically exhausting as the film itself and cannot be sustained alone for its whole length. The variance in the score is just too extreme, no consistent demeanor developed for the whole and the moments of catharsis forced cheaply into an otherwise bleak soundscape. That said, the highlights of this score are among the best of Newman's career, especially "The Night Window," and no collector of his work should be without these moments of impressive, symphonic triumph." Zanobard Reviews gave 5/10 to the album calling it as "decidingly unremarkable" and wrote "it's a bit of a shame really, as there are elements of Newman's score that are good but sadly none that last long enough to capture interest".

In a positive review, music critic Jonathan Broxton wrote "the score is nevertheless one well worth exploring. The highlights, like “The Night Window,” are among the best thing Newman has written this decade, the Hans Zimmer temp-track homages are still worthwhile if you can ignore how they came into being, and as for the rest of the score... well, it needs context for it to be appreciated fully, but the film is so good that appreciating it in context will likely be one of the most satisfying cinematic experiences of the year." Thomas Tunsall of Irish Film Critic commented that the score "exhibits another magnificent effort by the gifted Newman". Anton Smit of Soundtrack World wrote: "The music worked very well in the film. It was in the background for most of the time, was allowed to shine when it was needed, and most of these moments are the highlights of the album." Little Dabler commented "Newman's use of brass nods to the military, and the soundtrack replicates the parallel opening and closing camera shots, bringing the listener full circle."

=== Accolades ===
1917 marked the 14th nomination for Thomas Newman at the Academy Award for Best Original Score ever since his first with The Shawshank Redemption (1994). (Note: From 1995–1998, the Best Original Score award was split into Original Dramatic Score and Original Musical or Comedy Score. He received a nomination for Unstrung Heroes (1996) in the latter category.; Newman also received Best Original Song nomination for WALL-E (2008), in addition to an original score.) Several publications highlighted the possibility for Newman's score to fetch him an Academy Award. He further competed with his cousin Randy Newman whose score for the film, Marriage Story (2019) has been nominated for the "Best Original Score" categories at the 92nd Academy Awards, 77th Golden Globe Awards, 25th Critics' Choice Awards and 24th Satellite Awards, and few critics association based awards. Both Thomas and Randy, lose the separate main awards to Hildur Guðnadóttir for Joker (2019); whom became the first woman to win an Academy Award for Original Score since 1998.

Award	Date of ceremony	Category	Recipients	Result	Ref.
Academy Awards	9 February 2020	Best Original Score	Thomas Newman	Nominated	
Austin Film Critics Association	6 January 2020	Best Original Score	Thomas Newman	Won	
British Academy Film Awards	2 February 2020	Best Original Score	Thomas Newman	Nominated	
Chicago Film Critics Association	14 December 2019	Best Original Score	Thomas Newman	Nominated	
Critics' Choice Awards	12 January 2020	Best Original Score	Thomas Newman	Nominated	
Dallas–Fort Worth Film Critics Association	16 December 2019	Best Musical Score	Thomas Newman	Won	
Detroit Film Critics Society	9 December 2019	Best Use of Music	1917	Nominated	
Florida Film Critics Circle	23 December 2019	Best Score	Thomas Newman	Nominated	
Georgia Film Critics Association	10 January 2020	Best Original Score	Thomas Newman	Won	
Golden Globe Awards	5 January 2020	Best Original Score	Thomas Newman	Nominated	
Grammy Awards	14 March 2021	Best Score Soundtrack for Visual Media	Thomas Newman	Nominated	
Hollywood Critics Association Awards	9 January 2020	Best Score	Thomas Newman	Nominated	
Houston Film Critics Society	2 January 2020	Best Original Score	Thomas Newman	Won	
International Film Music Critics Association	20 February 2020	Best Original Score for an Action/Adventure/Thriller Film	Thomas Newman	Won	
International Film Music Critics Association	20 February 2020	Film Music Composition of the Year	"The Night Window" by Thomas Newman	Nominated	
International Film Music Critics Association	20 February 2020	Film Score of the Year	Thomas Newman	Nominated	
Los Angeles Film Critics Association	8 December 2019	Best Music	Thomas Newman	Runner-up	
Online Film Critics Society	6 January 2020	Best Original Score	Thomas Newman	Nominated	
San Francisco Bay Area Film Critics Circle	16 December 2019	Best Original Score	Thomas Newman	Nominated	
Satellite Awards	19 December 2019	Best Original Score	Thomas Newman	Nominated	
Saturn Awards	26 October 2021	Best Music	Thomas Newman	Nominated	
Seattle Film Critics Society	16 December 2019	Best Original Score	Thomas Newman	Nominated	
St. Louis Film Critics Association	15 December 2019	Best Music Score	Thomas Newman	Won	
Washington D.C. Area Film Critics Association	8 December 2019	Best Original Score	Thomas Newman	Nominated	
World Soundtrack Awards	24 October 2020	Film Composer of the Year	Thomas Newman	Nominated	

== Track listing ==
Track listing
No.	Title	Length
1.	"1917"	1:17
2.	"Up the Down Trench"	6:19
3.	"Gehenna"	3:34
4.	"A Scrap of Ribbon"	6:29
5.	"The Night Window"	3:41
6.	"The Boche"	3:21
7.	"Tripwire"	1:40
8.	"A Bit of Tin"	2:02
9.	"Lockhouse"	4:04
10.	"Blake and Schofield"	4:20
11.	"Milk"	10:10
12.	"Écoust-Saint-Mein"	2:36
13.	"Les Arbres"	3:36
14.	"Engländer"	4:29
15.	"The Rapids"	1:29
16.	"Croisilles Wood"	2:06
17.	"Sixteen Hundred Men"	6:32
18.	"Mentions in Dispatches"	3:44
19.	"Come Back to Us"	5:39
Total length:		1:17:08

== "I Am a Poor Wayfaring Stranger" ==
"I Am a Poor Wayfaring Stranger (From the Film 1917)"

Single by Jos Slovick
- Released: 7 February 2020
- Recorded: 2019
- Studio: Abbey Road Studios
- Genre: Orchestral
- Length: 4:09
- Label: Amblin Partners; Sony Classical
- Producers: Bill Bernstein; Thomas Newman

The soundtrack does not include the rendition of the American folk song The Wayfaring Stranger by Jos Slovick. In early 2020, a Change.org petition collected over 2,500 signatures to urge film producers Universal Pictures and DreamWorks Pictures to release a full studio version of Slovick's performance. Subsequently, Sony Classical Records released an EP of the song on 7 February on Amazon and streaming platforms.

Track listing
No.	Title	Artist	Length
1.	"I Am a Poor Wayfaring Stranger (From 1917 (A Cappella))"	Jos Slovick	4:09
2.	"I Am a Poor Wayfaring Stranger (From 1917)"	Jos Slovick & Craig Leon	4:49
3.	"I Am a Poor Wayfaring Stranger (Original Lyrics)"	Jos Slovick & Craig Leon	4:49
Total length:			13:47

== Personnel ==
Credits adapted from AllMusic.

- Thomas Newman – composer, producer, conductor, arranger
- Caroline Dale – cello
- Rick Cox – fiddle, siren
- George Doering – fiddle, electric guitar, frame drum, melodica, dulcimer, acoustic bass
- Steve Tavaglione – percussion, woodwind, reversed brass
- John Beasley – keyboards, synthesizer, sounds, effects
- J.A.C. Redford – orchestration
- Thomas Bowes – concertmaster
- Lucy Whalley – orchestra contractor
- Leslie Morris – contractor
- Shinnosuke Miyazawa – recording
- Gordon Davidson – orchestra recording, recordist
- Simon Rhodes – orchestra recording, mixing
- Dave Collins – mastering
- Bill Bernstein – producer, music editor
- Global Music Services – music preparation
- Jill Streater – copyist
- Reprise Music Services – music preparation
- Peter Clarke – music editor
- Daniel Hayden – engineer
- Jeff Gartenbaum – engineer
