= Tolkien (soundtrack) =

2019 film soundtrack album

Tolkien (Original Motion Picture Soundtrack)

Film score by Thomas Newman
- Released: 3 May 2019
- Recorded: 2019
- Studios: Abbey Road Studios, London
- Genre: Film score
- Length: 51:24
- Label: Sony Classical
- Producers: Thomas Newman; Bill Bernstein

Thomas Newman chronology
The Highwaymen (2019)	Tolkien (2019)	1917 (2019)

Tolkien (Original Motion Picture Soundtrack) is the film score to the 2019 film Tolkien directed by Dome Karukoski and starred Nicholas Hoult as J. R. R. Tolkien. The original score is composed by Thomas Newman and recorded at the Abbey Road Studios in London. It was released through Sony Classical Records on 3 May 2019.

== Background ==
In November 2018, it was announced that Thomas Newman would compose the musical score for Tolkien. Karukoski wanted an "unearthly", "mythological" and "ethereal" sounds that were essential to convey the central component in Tolkien's life and considered Newman's work complimenting that aspect perfectly. When Karukoski provided the dialogue-driven script, Newman was inspired by his goal to explore Tolkien's fantasy world on a deeper psychological level and worked on the score for over a year to create the musical soundscape. He recorded the score at the Abbey Road Studios in London, with the London Symphony Orchestra performing. The score was released through Sony Classical Records on 3 May 2019.

== Reception ==
Jonathan Broxton of Movie Music UK added that "Despite the lack of truly strong thematic content, I enjoyed Tolkien quite a lot. However, as I said, my fear is that some people will dismiss it for one of two reasons. Firstly, the fact that the sound and style of Howard Shore is so ingrained into popular culture as being the 'true' sound of Lord of the Rings could make it difficult for some listeners to accept another composer's stylistic approach. Secondly, the fact that this score is so rooted in Thomas Newman's well-defined career-encompassing sound may cause some listeners to dismiss it as being 'the same old Thomas Newman', the usual plinky-plonky pianos, string washes, and zinging dulcimers we have heard a hundred times before, and which now have nothing new to offer. While there may be some merit in these criticisms, especially the second one, I still found this score to be a delight. It has a warm, inviting sound that draws you into Tolkien's flights of fantasy and imagination, allows you to experience the world through his eyes, and encourages you to gain some insight into the inspiration behind one of the great literary masterpieces of the twentieth century."

Filmtracks wrote "Few cues in Tolkien fail to explore one of these themes, and with their consistently pleasant renderings, the listening experience as a whole is an effortlessly whimsical joy. If you remove the six minutes of the fear theme and perhaps the five minutes of the relatively sparse mysticism and imagination motif, then you are left with forty minutes of pure Thomas Newman bliss. Its lack of consolidated thematic coherence remains a significant problem intellectually, but this is a score for your heart, not your brain." Glenn Kenny of The New York Times wrote "the emphatic score by the customarily more nuanced Thomas Newman is one of the prime offenders." Pete Hammond of Deadline Hollywood wrote "Thomas Newman, as usual, supplies a musical score that nicely underlines the proceedings." David Ehrlich of IndieWire summarized the review: "Thomas Newman's score is so inspired by Howard Shore's genius that it sounds about three notes away from inspiring Howard Shore's legal team". Sandy Schaefer of Screen Rant called it "a richly emotional score by the ever-prolific Thomas Newman".

== Track listing ==
No.	Title	Length
1.	"Dragons"	1:14
2.	"Impecunious Circumstances"	1:26
3.	"The Great War"	1:42
4.	"The TCBS"	2:48
5.	"White As Bone"	3:29
6.	"John Ronald"	1:33
7.	"Vinátta (Friendship)"	0:42
8.	"Rugby"	0:49
9.	"Kings and Queens"	1:25
10.	"Army of the Dead"	1:48
11.	"Lúthien Tinúviel"	1:45
12.	"A Good Man in the Dirt"	2:45
13.	"Dutch Courage"	1:46
14.	"Sunlit"	1:15
15.	"Starlit"	2:26
16.	"Everything That's Good"	1:18
17.	"Geoffrey"	1:21
18.	"Eik (Oak)"	1:37
19.	"The Ascanius"	1:53
20.	"Black Rider"	3:21
21.	"Scuppered (Ancient Things)"	2:17
22.	"Other Sorts of Scars"	2:51
23.	"Dark Magic"	1:17
24.	"Fellowship"	5:06
25.	"Helheimr (End Crawl)"	3:30
Total length:		51:24

== Personnel ==
Credits adapted from liner notes:

- Music composer and conductor – Thomas Newman
- Music producer – Thomas Newman, Bill Bernstein
- Orchestrator – J. A. C. Redford
- Concertmaster – Thomas Bowes
- Orchestra – London Symphony Orchestra
- Choir – London Voices
- 29-string kantélé – Andrew Cronshaw
- Finger cymbals, triangle, high metals – Paul Clarvis
- Flute, piccolo flute, recorder, pennywhistles – Phil Todd
- Hardanger fiddle, monochord, jouhikko – Sonia Slany
- Mandolin, high-string guitar, bowed dulcimer, epinette des vosges – George Doering
- Soprano vocals – Grace Davidson
- Viola da Gamba – Nick Cooper
- Recording – Shinnosuke Miyazawa, Simon Rhodes
- Mixing – Simon Rhodes
