= Écoust-Saint-Mein =

- Commune
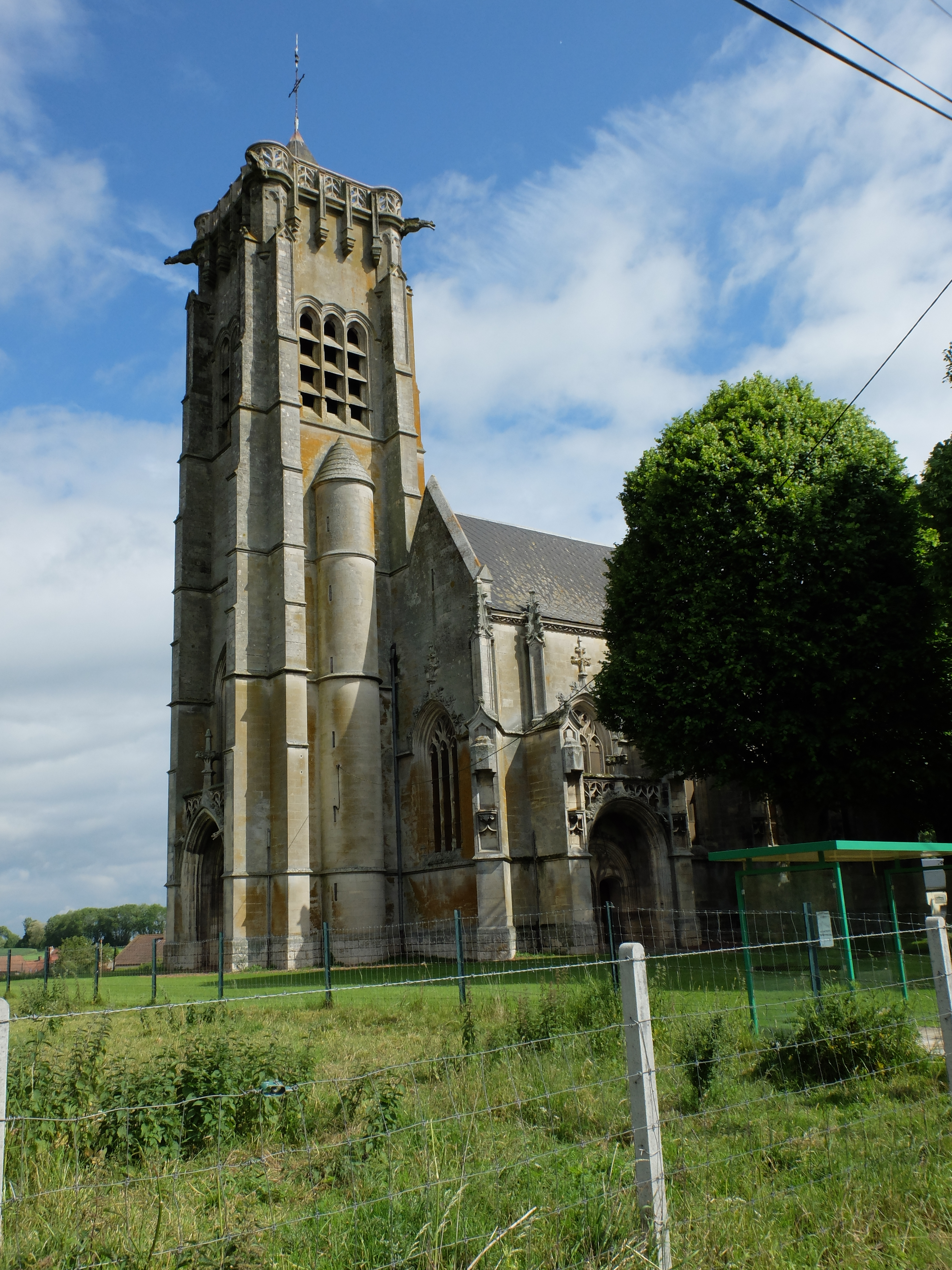
- The church of Écoust-Saint-Mein

- Coat of arms
- Location of Écoust-Saint-Mein
- Location within France Location within Hauts-de-France
- Coordinates: 50°10′57″N 2°54′39″E
- Country: France
- Region: Hauts-de-France
- Department: Pas-de-Calais
- Arrondissement: Arras
- Canton: Bapaume
- Intercommunality: CC Sud-Artois

Government
  - Mayor (2020–2026): Olivier Houplain
- Area^{1}: 8.43 km^{2} (3.25 sq mi)
- Elevation: 97 m (318 ft)
- Highest elevation: 117 m (384 ft)
- Lowest elevation: 84 m (276 ft)
- Population (2023): 485
  - Density: 57.5/km^{2} (149/sq mi)
- Time zone: UTC+01:00 (CET)
  - Summer (DST): UTC+02:00 (CEST)
- INSEE/Postal code: 62285 /62128
- ^{1} French Land Register data, which excludes lakes, ponds, glaciers > 1 km^{2} (0.386 sq mi or 247 acres) and river estuaries.

Écoust-Saint-Mein (French pronunciation: [eku sɛ̃ mɛ̃]) is a commune in the Pas-de-Calais département in the Hauts-de-France region of France 10 miles (16 km) southeast of Arras.

== Population ==
Historical population
Year	Pop.	±% p.a.
1968	466	—
1975	453	−0.40%
1982	468	+0.47%
1990	443	−0.68%
1999	429	−0.36%
2007	487	+1.60%
2012	506	+0.77%
2017	491	−0.60%
2023	485	−0.20%
Source: INSEE

== In popular culture ==
In the 2019 film 1917, Écoust-Saint-Mein is a setting.

== See also ==
- Communes of the Pas-de-Calais department
