= Greg Butler (visual effects supervisor) =

American visual effects supervisor

Gregory S. Butler (born August 18, 1971, Suffield, Connecticut) is an Academy Award-winning American visual effects supervisor. He graduated from Suffield High School in 1989 and afterwards entered Hampshire College. Despite his initial plans to study history, a work-study job with the audiovisual equipment in the library made him interested in film production. Butler graduated in 1993 with a major in film, television and theater design. Afterwards he moved to California to work for Industrial Light and Magic for 9 months, where after intern work he managed to become an assistant in the effects department, starting with assistant credits in The Mask and Forrest Gump. Following a job at Rocket Science Games until the company's bankruptcy in 1996, Butler went to Tippett Studio and did effects work in Starship Troopers and My Favorite Martian, rising up to a technical director job, and Cinesite for Practical Magic. While reluctant at the requirement of moving to New Zealand, Butler was convinced by his writer-actor brother to jump at the opportunity of working for Weta Digital in The Lord of the Rings. Among his achievements was working on the creation of Gollum. for which he was awarded a Visual Effects Society Award.

Butler also worked as a computer graphics supervisor on I, Robot before an invitation to work as an effects supervisor for the Moving Picture Company, in London. He later moved to MPC's, Vancouver office. On January 24, 2012, he won a BAFTA and was nominated for an Oscar for Harry Potter and the Deathly Hallows – Part 2.

He became a member of the Academy Of Motion Picture Arts and Sciences in 2012.

In 2020, he received his second BAFTA win and Academy Award nomination, and first win, for Best Visual Effects, for the 2019 film, 1917, at the 92nd Academy Awards.

After leaving MPC, he spent time working for Method Studios, where he worked as a VFX supervisor on feature, episodic, and advertising projects, including The Lord of the Rings: The Rings of Power for Amazon.

In June 2022 he began working for VFX and animation studio DNEG.
