= 2019 Los Angeles Film Critics Association Awards =

Annual US film awards ceremony

45th LAFCA Awards
- Date: December 8, 2019

Highlights
- Best Picture: Parasite

The 45th Los Angeles Film Critics Association Awards, given by the Los Angeles Film Critics Association (LAFCA), honored the best in film for 2019.

== Winners ==
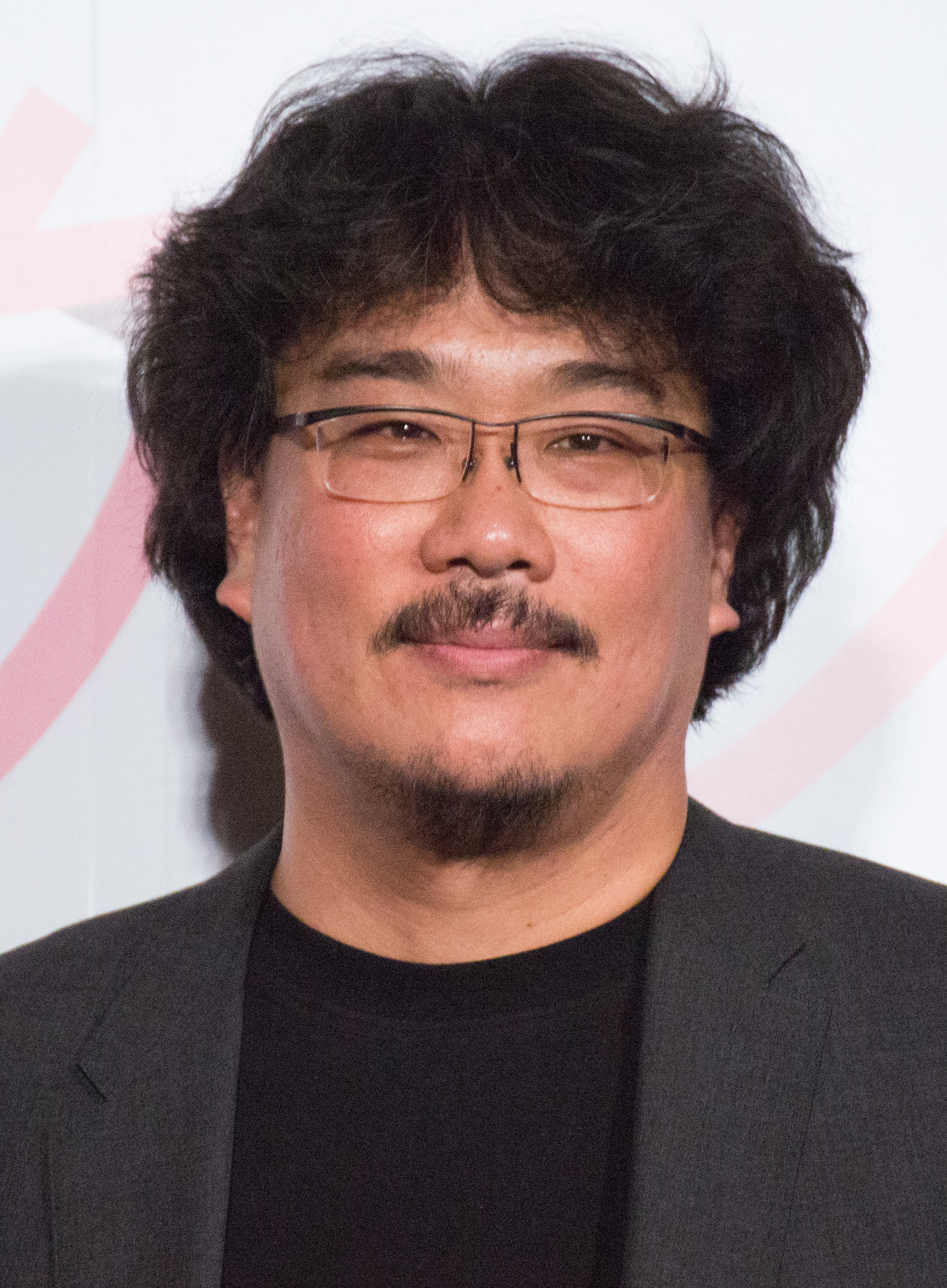
Bong Joon-ho, Best Director winner

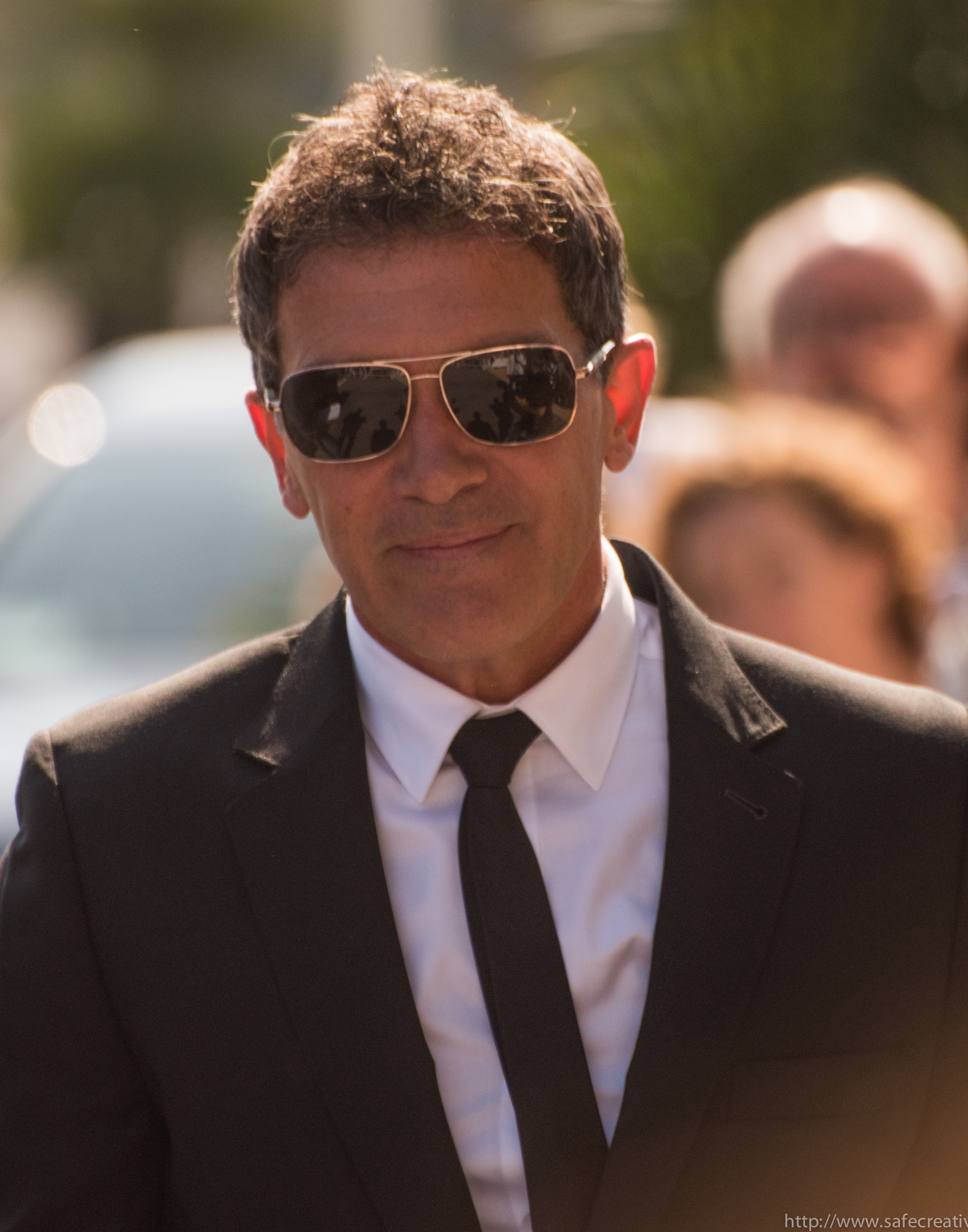
Antonio Banderas, Best Actor winner

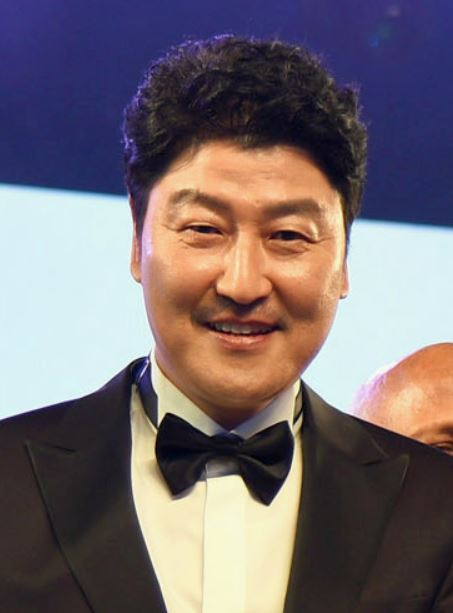
Song Kang-ho, Best Supporting Actor winner

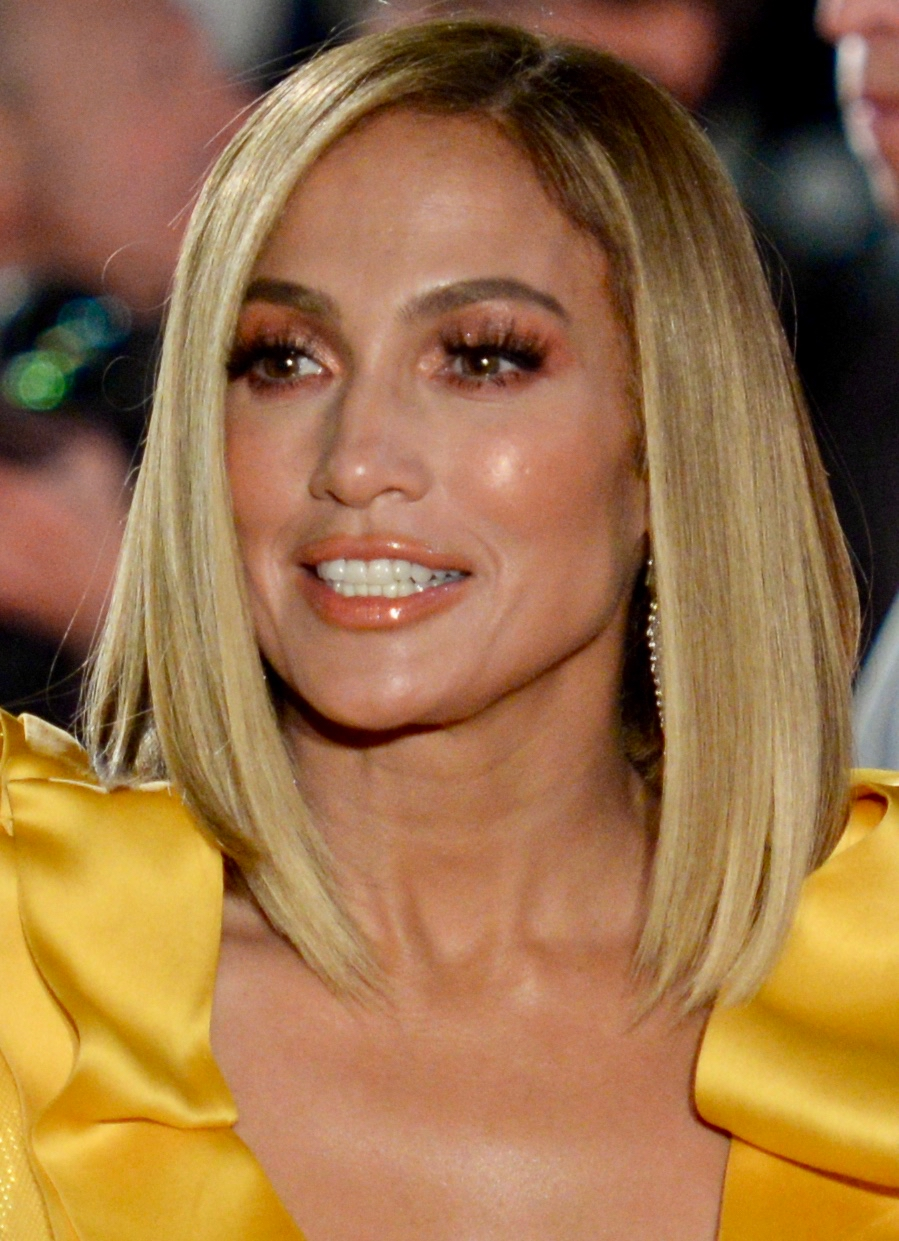
Jennifer Lopez, Best Supporting Actress winner

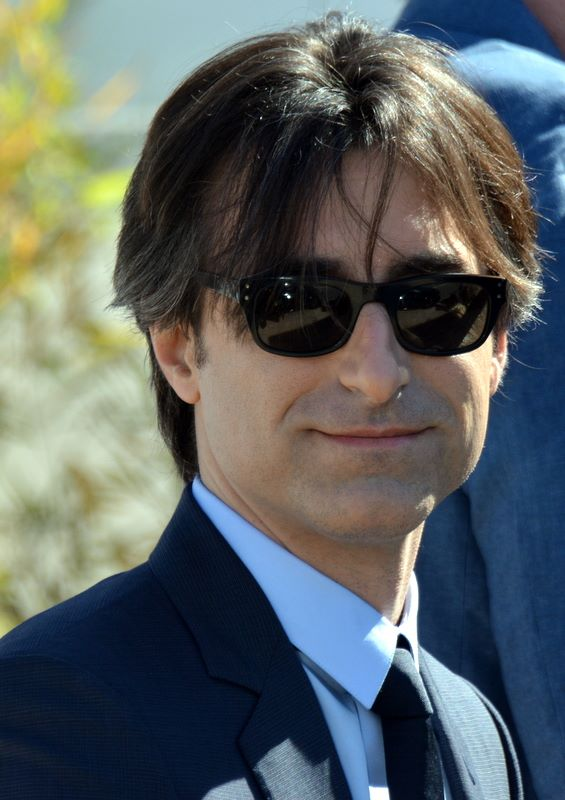
Noah Baumbach, Best Screenplay winner

- Best Film:
  - Parasite
    - Runner-up: The Irishman
- Best Director:
  - Bong Joon-ho – Parasite
    - Runner-up: Martin Scorsese – The Irishman
- Best Actor:
  - Antonio Banderas – Pain and Glory
    - Runner-up: Adam Driver – Marriage Story
- Best Actress:
  - Mary Kay Place – Diane
    - Runner-up: Lupita Nyong'o – Us
- Best Supporting Actor:
  - Song Kang-ho – Parasite
    - Runner-up: Joe Pesci – The Irishman
- Best Supporting Actress:
  - Jennifer Lopez – Hustlers
    - Runner-up: Zhao Shu-zhen – The Farewell
- Best Screenplay:
  - Noah Baumbach – Marriage Story
    - Runner-up: Bong Joon-ho and Han Jin-won – Parasite
- Best Cinematography:
  - Claire Mathon – Atlantics and Portrait of a Lady on Fire
    - Runner-up: Roger Deakins – 1917
- Best Editing:
  - Todd Douglas Miller – Apollo 11
    - Runner-up: Ronald Bronstein and Benny Safdie – Uncut Gems
- Best Production Design:
  - Barbara Ling – Once Upon a Time in Hollywood
    - Runner-up: Ha-jun Lee – Parasite
- Best Music Score:
  - Dan Levy – I Lost My Body
    - Runner-up: Thomas Newman – 1917
- Best Foreign Language Film:
  - Pain and Glory • Spain
    - Runner-up: Portrait of a Lady on Fire • France
- Best Documentary/Non-Fiction Film:
  - American Factory
    - Runner-up: Apollo 11
- Best Animation:
  - I Lost My Body
    - Runner-up: Toy Story 4
- New Generation Award:
  - Jimmie Fails, Jonathan Majors, and Joe Talbot – The Last Black Man in San Francisco
- Career Achievement Award:
  - Elaine May
- The Douglas Edwards Experimental/Independent Film/Video Award:
  - Ja'Tovia Gary – The Giverny Document
