= Lee Smith (film editor) =

Australian film editor

Lee Smith, ACE, (born June 10, 1960) is an Australian film editor who has worked in the film industry since the 1980s. He began his film career as a sound editor before establishing himself as an editor. His breakthrough came when he began collaborating with director Peter Weir. Smith is best known for his work on several of Christopher Nolan's films, including Batman Begins (2005), The Prestige (2006), The Dark Knight (2008), Inception (2010), The Dark Knight Rises (2012), Interstellar (2014) and Dunkirk (2017), for which he won the Academy Award for Best Film Editing. Smith has edited all of Sam Mendes's films since 2015, including Spectre (2015), 1917 (2019) and Empire of Light (2022).

== Life and career ==
Smith was born in Harefield, Middlesex in England. He was nominated for the Academy Award for Best Film Editing for Master and Commander: The Far Side of the World (2004) and The Dark Knight (2008). He was also nominated for the BAFTA Award for Best Editing for The Dark Knight and for Inception (2010). He was nominated for the BAFTA Award for Best Sound for The Piano (1993). He began his career as a sound editor/sound designer for films such as Dead Calm (1989), The Piano (1993) (for which he was nominated for the BAFTA Award for Best Sound), The Portrait of a Lady (1996) and Holy Smoke! (1999). Smith was also editing films during this interval; he was one of the editors for RoboCop 2 (1990).

He began his notable collaboration with director Peter Weir on the 1982 film The Year of Living Dangerously, on which he was an associate editor working with Weir's longtime editor William M. Anderson. He was credited as a co-editor with Anderson for Fearless (1993) and for The Truman Show (1998). He was the sole editor for Weir's Master and Commander: The Far Side of the World (2003), for which Smith was nominated for the Academy Award for Film Editing and for an "Eddie Award" from the American Cinema Editors.

Smith has edited seven films with director Christopher Nolan. He was nominated for a second Academy Award and American Cinema Editors Award for The Dark Knight (2008). In 2010, he received another nomination for the American Cinema Editors Award for his editing work on Inception; Inception was listed as the 35th best-edited film of all time in a 2012 survey of members of the Motion Picture Editors Guild. In 2018, he received an Academy Award for his work on Nolan's Dunkirk.

Since 2015, Smith has regularly collaborated with Sam Mendes, editing his films Spectre (2015), 1917 (2019) and Empire of Light (2022). He will edit the upcoming film series The Beatles – A Four-Film Cinematic Event (2028).

== Filmography ==
Editor

Year	Title	Director	Notes	Ref.
1986	Dead End Drive-In	Brian Trenchard-Smith		
1987	Howling III	Philippe Mora		
1989	Communion	Philippe Mora		
1990	RoboCop 2	Irvin Kershner		
1992	Turtle Beach	Stephen Wallace		
1992	Blinky Bill: The Mischievous Koala	Yoram Gross		
1993	Fearless	Peter Weir		
1996	Lilian's Story	Jerzy Domaradzki		
1997	Joey	Ian Barry		
1998	The Truman Show	Peter Weir	Co-edited with William Anderson	
1999	Two Hands	Gregor Jordan		
2000	Risk	Alan White		
2001	Buffalo Soldiers	Gregor Jordan		
2002	Black and White	Craig Lahiff		
2003	The Rage in Placid Lake	Tony McNamara		
2003	Master and Commander: The Far Side of the World	Peter Weir		
2005	Batman Begins	Christopher Nolan		
2006	The Prestige	Christopher Nolan		
2008	The Dark Knight	Christopher Nolan		
2010	The Way Back	Peter Weir		
2010	Inception	Christopher Nolan		
2011	X-Men: First Class	Matthew Vaughn		
2012	The Dark Knight Rises	Christopher Nolan		
2013	Elysium	Neill Blomkamp	Co-edited with Julian Clarke	
2013	Ender's Game	Gavin Hood		
2014	Interstellar	Christopher Nolan		
2015	Spectre	Sam Mendes		
2017	Dunkirk	Christopher Nolan		
2019	Dark Phoenix	Simon Kinberg		
2019	1917	Sam Mendes		
2022	Empire of Light	Sam Mendes		
2024	Argylle	Matthew Vaughn		
2024	Better Man	Michael Gracey	Co-edited with Martin Connor, Spencer Susser, Jeff Groth and Patrick Correll	
2024	The Unholy Trinity	Richard Gray		
2028	The Beatles – A Four-Film Cinematic Event (Note: Including Untitled Paul McCartney film, Untitled John Lennon film, Untitled George Harrison film and Untitled Ringo Starr film) †	Sam Mendes		

Other credits

Year	Title	Director	Notes
1978	Little Boy Lost	Terry Bourke	Assistant sound editor
1980	The Chain Reaction	Ian Barry	Additional sound
1981	Puberty Blues	Bruce Beresford	Editing assistant
1982	Turkey Shoot	Brian Trenchard-Smith	Dubbing editor
1982	The Year of Living Dangerously	Peter Weir	Associate editor
1985	Burke & Wills	Graeme Clifford	Sound effects editor
1988	The Navigator: A Medieval Odyssey	Vincent Ward	Sound effects editor / Sound effects supervisor
1988	Barracuda	Pino Amenta	Television film Sound editor
1989	Dead Calm	Phillip Noyce	Sound designer
1989	Dead Poets Society	Peter Weir	Additional film editor
1990	Green Card	Peter Weir	Additional film editor
1992	Lorenzo's Oil	George Miller	Additional picture editor
1993	The Piano	Jane Campion	Sound designer
1994	Little Women	Gillian Armstrong	Sound designer
1995	Tunnel Vision	Clive Fleury	Foley walker
1996	The Portrait of a Lady	Jane Campion	Sound designer
1999	Holy Smoke!	Jane Campion	Sound designer

== Awards and nominations ==
Academy Awards

Year	Category	Title	Result
2003	Master and Commander: The Far Side of the World	Best Film Editing	Nominated
2008	The Dark Knight	Best Film Editing	Nominated
2017	Dunkirk	Best Film Editing	Won

BAFTA Awards

Year	Category	Title	Result
2008	The Dark Knight	Best Editing	Nominated
2010	Inception	Best Editing	Nominated
2017	Dunkirk	Best Editing	Nominated

Other awards

Year	Title	Award/Nomination
1998	The Truman Show	Nominated- Awards Circuit Community Awards for Best Editing; Nominated- Online Film Critics Society Award for Best Editing
1999	Two Hands	AACTA Award for Best Editing
2003	Master and Commander: The Far Side of the World	Nominated- Satellite Award for Best Editing; Nominated- American Cinema Editors for Best Editing; Nominated- International Online Cinema Awards for Best Editing; Nominated- Phoenix Film Critics Society Award for Best Editing
2008	The Dark Knight	Awards Circuit Community Awards for Best Editing; International Online Cinema Awards for Best Editing; Gold Derby Awards for Best Editing; Hollywood Post Alliance for Best Editing; Nominated- ACE Eddie for Best Edited Feature Film – Dramatic; Nominated- Satellite Award for Best Editing; Nominated- International Cinephile Society Awards for Best Editing; Nominated- American Cinema Editors for Best Editing; Nominated- Online Film Critics Society Award for Best Editing; Nominated-Italian Online Movie Awards for Best Editing; Nominated- Awards Circuit Community Awards for Best Editing of the Decade
2010	Inception	Broadcast Film Critics Association Award for Best Editing; Las Vegas Film Critics Society Awards for Best Editing; Online Film Critics Society Award for Best Editing; Phoenix Film Critics Society Award for Best Editing; CinEuphoria Awards for Best Editing; Hollywood Post Alliance for Best Editing; Gold Derby Awards for Best Editing; Online Film & Television Association for Best Editing; Italian Online Movie Awards for Best Editing; Nominated- ACE Eddie for Best Edited Feature Film – Dramatic; Nominated- Satellite Award for Best Editing; Nominated- Alliance of Women Film Journalists for Best Editing; Nominated- Awards Circuit Community Awards for Best Editing; Nominated- Boston Society of Film Critics Awards for Best Editing; Nominated- International Cinephile Society Awards for Best Editing; Nominated- International Online Cinema Awards for Best Editing; Nominated- American Cinema Editors for Best Editing
2011	X-Men: First Class	Nominated- Hollywood Post Alliance for Best Editing
2012	The Dark Knight Rises	Nominated- Phoenix Film Critics Society Award for Best Editing; Nominated- Hollywood Post Alliance for Best Editing
2014	Interstellar	Nominated- Saturn Award for Best Editing; Nominated- Hollywood Post Alliance for Best Editing; Nominated- Broadcast Film Critics Association Award for Best Editing; Nominated- Gold Derby Awards for Best Editing; Nominated- Phoenix Film Critics Society Awards for Best Editing; Nominated- Washington D.C. Area Film Critics Association for Best Editing; Nominated- Cinema Bloggers Awards for Best Editing
2017	Dunkirk	Broadcast Film Critics Association Award for Best Editing; Gold Derby Awards for Best Editing; Alliance of Women Film Journalists for Best Editing; Phoenix Film Critics Society Award for Best Editing; ACE Eddie for Best Edited Feature Film – Dramatic; Boston Online Film Critics Association for Best Editing; Los Angeles Film Critics Association Awards for Best Editing; Online Film Critics Society for Best Editing; Hollywood Professional Association for Best Editing; Hawaii Film Critics Society for Best Editing; Hollywood Post Alliance for Best Editing; Seattle Film Critics Awards for Best Editing; American Cinema Editors for Best Editing; International Online Cinema Awards for Best Editing; Awards Circuit Community Awards for Best Editing; Nominated- Satellite Award for Best Editing; Nominated- Washington D.C. Area Film Critics Association for Best Editing; Nominated- San Francisco Film Critics Circle for Best Editing; Nominated- San Diego Film Critics Society Award for Best Editing; Nominated- Chicago Film Critics Association Award for Best Editing; Nominated- St. Louis Film Critics Association; Nominated- Chicago Ohio Film Critics Association for Best Editing; Nominated- Chicago Indie Critics Awards for Best Editing; Nominated- International Cinephile Society Awards for Best Editing
2019	1917	Phoenix Film Critics Society Awards; Broadcast Film Critics Association Awards for Best Editing; Music City Film Critics' Association Awards for Best Editing; Chicago Independent Film Critics Circle Awards for Best Editing; Nominated- Chicago Film Critics Association Awards for Best Editing; Nominated- Hollywood Critics Association for Best Editing; Nominated- San Francisco Film Critics Circle for Best Editing; Nominated- Satellite Award for Best Editing; Nominated- Seattle Film Critics Awards for Best Editing; Nominated- St. Louis Film Critics Association for Best Editing; Nominated- Washington DC Area Film Critics Association Awards for Best Editing; Nominated- Alliance of Women Film Journalists for Best Editing; Nominated- Austin Film Critics Association for Best Editing; Nominated- Central Ohio Film Critics Association for Best Editing; Nominated- Online Film Critics Society Awards for Best Editing
