= Alfred Mendes =

Trinidadian writer (1897–1991)

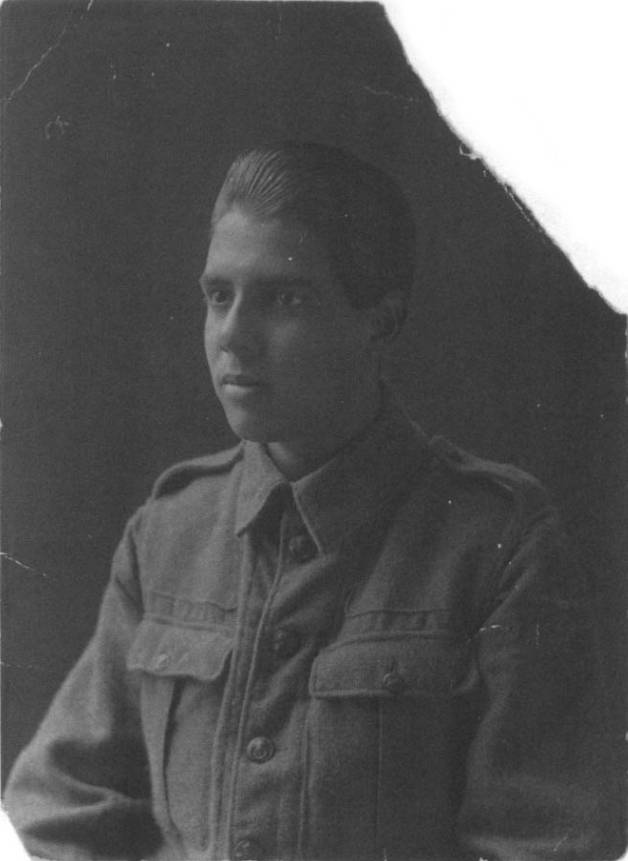
- Mendes as a teenager during World War I
- Born: Alfred Hubert Mendes; 18 November 1897; Trinidad and Tobago
- Died: 1991 (aged 93–94); Barbados
- Occupations: Novelist, short-story writer
- Known for: Member of "Beacon group" of writers
- Notable work: Pitch Lake (1934); Black Fauns (1935)
- Relatives: Sam Mendes (grandson); Joe Anders (great-grandson)
- Military career
- Allegiance: United Kingdom
- Branch: British Army
- Service years: 1915–1917
- Rank: Lance Corporal
- Unit: 1st Battalion King's Royal Rifle Brigade
- Conflicts: World War I (WIA)
- Awards: Military Medal

Alfred Hubert Mendes MM (18 November 1897 – 1991) was a Trinidadian novelist and short-story writer. He was a leading member of the 1930s "Beacon group" of writers (named after the literary magazine The Beacon) in Trinidad and Tobago which included Albert Gomes, C. L. R. James, and Ralph de Boissière. Mendes is best known as the author of two novels – Pitch Lake (1934) and Black Fauns (1935) – and for his short stories written during the 1920s and 1930s. He was "one of the first West Indian writers to set the pattern of emigration in the face of the lack of publishing houses and the small reading public in the West Indies." Mendes' experiences in World War I were the inspiration for the 2019 film 1917, written and directed by his grandson Sam Mendes.

== Early life and education ==
Mendes was born in Trinidad, the eldest of six children in a Portuguese Creole family, and the son of Isabella Mendes (née Jardine) and Alfred Mendes. Mendes was educated in Port of Spain until 1912, then, at the age of 15, went to continue his studies in the United Kingdom, attending Hitchin Grammar School. His hopes of going on to university were interrupted by the outbreak of the First World War.

== Military career ==
After briefly returning to Trinidad in 1915, against his father's wishes he joined the Merchant Contingents of Trinidad — whose purpose was to enroll and transport to Britain young men who wished to serve in the war "for King and Country" — and sailed back to the United Kingdom. He served in the 1st Battalion, Rifle Brigade, and fought for two years in Flanders along the Belgian Front and was awarded a Military Medal for distinguishing himself on the battlefield. Towards the end of the war, he accidentally inhaled poisonous gas, and was sent back to Britain to recover.

His experience of the war served as an inspiration to his grandson, Sam Mendes, in the making of his 2019 film 1917. In fact, Sam Mendes explains that like the fictional soldiers' mission in 1917, Alfred Mendes also carried messages through the perilous territory of no-man's land, and the fact that he was 5 feet 4 inches (163 cm) tall enabled him to avoid detection because the winter mist that shrouded the territory was often 6 feet (180 cm) high. Sam Mendes also described how his grandfather Alfred did not talk about his wartime experiences until he was in his 70s. One remnant of his experience in mud-drenched trench warfare was his lifelong habit of continually washing his hands for several minutes at a time.

== Literary career ==
Mendes returned to Trinidad in 1919, and worked in his wealthy father's provisions business, while spending his spare time writing poetry and fiction, and in establishing contact with other writers, artists and scholars.

Together with C. L. R. James, Mendes produced two issues of a pioneering literary magazine called Trinidad (Christmas 1929 and Easter 1930). Several of his stories appeared in The Beacon, the journal edited by Albert Gomes from March 1931 until November 1939. Mendes was quoted as saying in 1972: "James and I departed from the convention in the selection of our material, in the choice of a strange way of life, in the use of a new dialect. And these departures are still with our Caribbean successors." In all, Mendes published about 60 short stories in magazines and journals in Trinidad, New York, London, and Paris.

In 1933 he went to New York City, remaining there until 1940. While in the United States, he joined literary salons and associated with writers including Richard Wright, Countee Cullen, Claude McKay, William Saroyan, Benjamin Appel, Thomas Wolfe, Malcolm Lowry, Ford Madox Ford, William Faulkner, Sherwood Anderson, and James T. Farrell.

Mendes's first novel, Pitch Lake, appeared in 1934, with an introduction by Aldous Huxley, and was followed by Black Fauns in 1935. Both published by Duckworth in London, the novels are significant in the history of literature from the Caribbean region and are landmarks in the establishment of social realism in the West Indian novel.

== Later years ==
In 1940, Mendes went back to Trinidad. He abandoned writing and worked in Trinidad's civil service, becoming General Manager of the Port Services Department. He was one of the founding members of the United Front, a party with socialist leanings that participated in the 1946 general elections. After his retirement in 1972, he lived in Mallorca and Gran Canaria and ultimately settled in Barbados. In 1972, he was awarded an honorary D.Litt. by the University of the West Indies for his contribution to the development of West Indian literature. He began writing his autobiography in 1975.

Mendes and his wife Ellen both died in 1991 in Barbados and are buried together there in Christ Church Cemetery. His unfinished drafts were edited by Michèle Levy and published in 2002 by the University of the West Indies Press as The Autobiography of Alfred H. Mendes 1897–1991.

== Personal life ==
Mendes married in October 1919, and had a son, Alfred John, the following year. His first wife, Jessie Rodriguez, died of pneumonia after only two years of marriage. A second marriage, a year later, ended in divorce in 1938. His third wife was Ellen Perachini, mother of his last two sons, Jameson Peter and Stephen Michael. He is the grandfather of Academy Award–winning director Sam Mendes, whose 2019 film 1917 is inspired by Mendes' First World War stories. He is the great-grandfather of actor Joe Anders.

== Selected bibliography ==
- Pitch Lake, London: Duckworth, 1934.
- Black Fauns, London: Duckworth, 1935.
